= Sonny Clark Quintets =

Sonny Clark Quintet

Studio album by Sonny Clark
- Released: 1976
- Recorded: December 8, 1957 & January 5, 1958; Van Gelder Studio, Hackensack, New Jersey
- Genre: Jazz
- Length: 37:47
- Labels: Blue Note; LNJ 70093
- Producer: Alfred Lion

Sonny Clark chronology
Sonny Clark Trio (1957)	Sonny Clark Quintet (1976)	Cool Struttin' (1958)

Professional ratings
Review scores
Source	Rating
Allmusic	4/5 stars

Sonny Clark Quintet is an album by jazz pianist Sonny Clark, recorded for the Blue Note label, featuring performances by Clark with two different studio quintets. The first session, from late 1957, featured Clifford Jordan, Kenny Burrell, Paul Chambers, and Pete LaRoca, and produced three tracks. The LP's remaining two tracks were recorded a few weeks later with group including Art Farmer, Jackie McLean, Chambers, and Philly Joe Jones. The three pieces recorded with Burrell and Jordan were originally scheduled to be released on album given the catalog number "BLP 1592" (these tracks would be later issued as bonus tracks on the CD release of My Conception). Blue Note decided not to complete the album begun with Jordan and Burrell, and the tracks remained unreleased during Clark's lifetime. In 1976, Blue Note combined these three tracks with two outtakes recorded in early 1958 as part of the session for the Cool Struttin' LP (BLP 1588). The resulting LP was released in Japan as Sonny Clark Quintet (LNJ 70093). The same five pieces were subsequently re-released on a 1983 Japanese LP titled Cool Struttin' Volume 2. Sonny Clark Quintet has been reissued numerous times on compact disc.

In an Allmusic review, Lee Bloom stated: "Of interest to fans of the superb hard bop pianist, this recording combines material from two separate dates. 'Royal Flush' and 'Lover' are from the January 1958 Cool Struttin' session and are available domestically on the CD release of the same name. The remaining tunes, 'Minor Meeting,' 'Eastern Incident' and 'Little Sonny,' were never released during Clark's short life — they are special for fans of Sonny, as they include guitarist Kenny Burrell. Clark rarely worked with a guitarist, although he recorded some wonderful material with Grant Green, Tal Farlow, and Jimmy Raney, three masterful players. His playing here never clashes harmonically or rhythmically with the guitar, a challenging feat for any jazz pianist. These three original tunes are also welcome additions to the consistently excellent body of work which Sonny Clark composed".

== Track listing ==
All compositions by Sonny Clark, except as indicated

1. "Royal Flush" - 9:03
2. "Lover" (Richard Rodgers, Lorenz Hart) - 7:04
3. "Minor Meeting" - 6:54
4. "Eastern Incident" - 8:14
5. "Little Sonny" - 6:32

Recorded on December 8, 1957 (#3-5) and January 5, 1958 (#1-2).

== Personnel ==
- Sonny Clark - piano
- Clifford Jordan - tenor saxophone (tracks 3–5)
- Kenny Burrell - guitar (tracks 3–5)
- Art Farmer - trumpet (tracks 1–2)
- Jackie McLean - alto saxophone (tracks 1–2)
- Paul Chambers - bass
- Philly Joe Jones (tracks 1–2), Pete LaRoca (tracks 3–5) - drums

=== Production ===
- Alfred Lion - producer
- Reid Miles - design
- Rudy Van Gelder - engineer
- Francis Wolff - photography
