= Standards (Sonny Clark album) =

1998 compilation album by Sonny Clark

Compilation album by Sonny Clark
- Released: February 10, 1998
- Recorded: November 16 & December 7, 1958; Van Gelder Studio, Hackensack
- Genre: Jazz
- Length: 62:20
- Label: Blue Note; Blue Note 21283
- Producer: Alfred Lion

Sonny Clark chronology
Cool Struttin' (1957)	Standards (1998)	My Conception (1959)

Professional ratings
Review scores
Source	Rating
Allmusic	3/5 stars
The Penguin Guide to Jazz Recordings	3/4 stars

Standards is a 1998 compilation album by jazz pianist Sonny Clark recorded for the Blue Note label and performed by Clark with Jymie Merritt or Paul Chambers, and Wes Landers, combining sessions previously released as The Art of The Trio and Blues in the Night.

== Reception ==
The album was awarded 3 stars by Stephen Thomas Erlewine in an Allmusic review which stated "Although some of the performances are a little brief, limiting his opportunity to solo, Standards is a lovely collection of beautiful music that's a welcome addition to Clark's catalog".

== Track listing ==
1. "Blues in the Night" (Harold Arlen, Johnny Mercer) - 5:54
2. "Can't We Be Friends?" (Paul James, Kay Swift) - 4:20
3. "Somebody Loves Me" (Buddy DeSylva, George Gershwin, Ballard MacDonald) - 4:18
4. "All of You" (Cole Porter) - 3:54
5. "Dancing in the Dark" (Arthur Schwartz, Howard Dietz) - 3:31
6. "I Cover the Waterfront" (Johnny Green, Edward Heyman) - 4:41
7. "Blues in the Night" [Alternate Take] - 7:15
8. "Gee, Baby, Ain't I Good to You" (Andy Razaf, Don Redman) - 4:01
9. "Ain't No Use" (Leroy Kirkland, Sidney Wyche) - 4:49
10. "I Can't Give You Anything But Love" (Dorothy Fields, Jimmy McHugh) - 3:52
11. "Black Velvet" (Illinois Jacquet, Jimmy Mundy) - 3:23
12. "I'm Just a Lucky So-and-So (Mack David, Duke Ellington) - 4:33
13. "The Breeze and I" (Tutti Camarata, Ernesto Lecuona, Al Stillman) - 4:00
14. "Gee Baby, Ain't I Good to You" [Alternate Take] - 3:49

Recorded on November 16 (#8-14) and December 7 (#1-7), 1958.

== Personnel ==
- Sonny Clark - piano
- Jymie Merritt (#8-14), Paul Chambers (#1-7) - bass
- Wes Landers - drums

=== Production ===
- Alfred Lion - producer
- Reid Miles - design
- Rudy Van Gelder - engineer
- Francis Wolff - photography
