= 2 Feet in the Gutter =

Studio album by The Dave Bailey Quintet
- Released: 1961
- Recorded: October 6, 1961
- Studio: Columbia 30th Street Studio, Manhattan
- Genre: Jazz
- Length: 36:45
- Label: Epic (LA 16021)
- Producer: Mike Berniker

Dave Bailey chronology
Bash! (1961)	2 Feet in the Gutter (1961)

2 Feet in the Gutter is the final album led by jazz drummer Dave Bailey which was originally released on the Epic label in 1961. The album features the first recording of "Comin' Home Baby" which became a top 40 hit for Mel Tormé.

== Reception ==
Professional ratings
Review scores
Source	Rating
AllMusic	4/5 stars

AllMusic reviewer Ken Dryden stated: "While this record is just a notch beneath Dave Bailey's earlier dates for Epic – One Foot in the Gutter and Gettin' Into Somethin' – it is definitely worth picking up".

== Track listing ==
1. "Comin' Home Baby" (Ben Tucker) – 5:39
2. "Two Feet in the Gutter" (Rudy Stevenson) – 7:59
3. "Shiny Stockings" (Frank Foster) – 7:54
4. "Lady Iris B" (Stevenson) – 6:08
5. "Coffee Walk" (Tucker) – 9:05

== Personnel ==
- Dave Bailey – drum kit
- Bill Hardman – trumpet
- Frank Haynes – tenor saxophone
- Billy Gardner – piano
- Ben Tucker – double bass
