= Blues in the Night (disambiguation) =

Blues in the Night may refer to:

- "Blues in the Night", popular song which has become a pop standard
- Blues in the Night (film), 1941 movie
- Blues in the Night (musical), a 1982 Broadway revue
- Blues in the Night, a 2006 album by Ann Hampton Callaway
- Blues in the Night (Jo Stafford album), 2007
- Blues in the Night (Sonny Clark album)
- Blues in the Night (RIAS Berlin serial)
