= Cabin in the Sky (Curtis Fuller album) =

Studio album by Curtis Fuller
- Released: 1962
- Recorded: April 24 & 25, 1962
- Studio: Van Gelder Studio, Englewood Cliffs, New Jersey
- Genre: Jazz
- Length: 40:05
- Label: Impulse! A/AS 22
- Producer: Bob Thiele

Curtis Fuller chronology
Soul Trombone (1961)	Cabin in the Sky (1962)	Crankin' (1971)

Cabin in the Sky is a 1962 album featuring songs from the musical Cabin in the Sky by jazz trombonist Curtis Fuller accompanied by an orchestra arranged and conducted by Manny Albam which was released on the Impulse! label.

== Reception ==
Professional ratings
Review scores
Source	Rating
Down Beat	3/5 stars
Allmusic	3/5 stars

The Allmusic website awarded the album 3 stars, as did an October 25, 1962 review by Down Beat magazine.

== Track listing ==
All compositions by Vernon Duke and John La Touche except where noted

1. "The Prayer / Taking a Chance on Love" (George Bassman, Roger Edens / Duke, La Touche, Ted Fetter) - 4:42
2. "Cabin in the Sky" - 3:53
3. "The Old Ship of Zion" (Traditional) - 3:15
4. "Do What You Wanna Do" - 4:05
5. "Honey in the Honeycomb" - 3:17
6. "Happiness is a Thing Called Joe" (Harold Arlen, Yip Harburg) - 5:45
7. "Savannah" - 2:39
8. "Love Turned the Light Out" - 3:39
9. "In My Old Virginia Home (On the River Nile)" - 3:32
10. "Love Me Tomorrow (But Leave Me Alone Today) / The Prayer" (Duke, La Touche / Bassman, Edens) - 5:18

== Personnel ==
- Curtis Fuller - trombone
- Al DeRisi, Bernie Glow, Freddie Hubbard, Ernie Royal - trumpet
- Ray Alonge, Jim Buffington, Anthony Miranda, Morris Secon - French horn
- Wayne Andre, Kai Winding - trombone
- Bob Brookmeyer - valve trombone
- Alan Raph - trombone, bass trombone
- Harvey Phillips - tuba
- Eddie Costa - vibraphone, percussion
- Barry Galbraith - guitar
- Hank Jones - piano
- Art Davis, Milt Hinton - bass
- Osie Johnson - drums
- Harry Lookofsky - violin, concertmaster
- Margaret Ross - harp
- Unnamed string section
- Manny Albam - arranger, conductor
