= Up Jumped Spring =

Studio album by Curtis Fuller with Brad Goode
- Released: March 16, 2004
- Recorded: August 31 & September 1, 2003
- Studio: Riverside Studio, Chicago
- Genre: Jazz
- Length: 61:05
- Label: Delmark; DC-550
- Producer: Robert G. Koester, Jacey Falk

Curtis Fuller chronology
Blues-ette Part II (1993)	Up Jumped Spring (2004)	Keep It Simple (2004)

Up Jumped Spring is an album by trombonist Curtis Fuller recorded in 2003 and released by the Delmark label the following year.

== Reception ==
Professional ratings
Review scores
Source	Rating
Allmusic	3.5/5 stars
The Penguin Guide to Jazz Recordings	3/4 stars

Allmusic's Alex Henderson wrote: "A strong Jazz Messengers influence asserts itself on these hard bop and post-bop performances ... the trombonist is in fine form throughout the album -- he never fails to sound inspired and focused -- and Up Jumped Spring is a welcome addition to his catalog."

Doug Ramsey of JazzTimes wrote: "Following illness and the loss of a lung, Curtis Fuller has a trombone sound that’s a bit wooly. But it’s still round and full, and his breath control, speed and agility are intact-and his imagination still flourishes. ... With a solid Chicago rhythm section, Fuller and trumpeter Brad Goode make music the old-fashioned way, with compact improvisations on familiar tunes rather than extended explorations of original material. Their front-line work is a study in sonic contrast, Goode’s penetrating sound against Fuller’s enveloping suppleness".

On All About Jazz, Terrell Kent Holmes noted: "The timeless Curtis Fuller has been a brand name trombone player for about 50 years now and he's never sounded better than he does ... not only does he still have strong chops but he can bring a fresh perspective to classics and originals."

== Track listing ==
1. "Cantaloupe Island" (Herbie Hancock) – 5:47
2. "Up Jumped Spring" (Freddie Hubbard) – 6:29
3. "In a Mellow Tone" (Duke Ellington, Milt Gabler) – 5:44
4. "God Bless the Child" (Billie Holiday, Arthur Herzog Jr.) – 6:15
5. "Bags' Groove" (Milt Jackson) – 4:11
6. "Equinox" (John Coltrane) – 5:40
7. "I'm Old Fashioned" (Jerome Kern, Johnny Mercer) – 5:11
8. "Alone Together" (Arthur Schwartz, Howard Dietz) – 4:52
9. "Whisper Not" (Benny Golson) – 2:57
10. "Black Night" (Jessie Mae Robinson) – 6:08
11. "Star Eyes" (Gene de Paul, Don Raye) – 7:51

== Personnel ==
- Curtis Fuller – trombone
- Brad Goode – trumpet
- Karl Montzka – piano
- Larry Gray (tracks 1–3 & 9), Stewart Miller (tracks 5–8, 10 & 11) – bass
- Tim Davis – drums
- Jacey Falk – vocals (track 10)
