= Don'cha Go 'Way Mad =

1949 song by Illinois Jacquet, Jimmy Mundy, and Al Stillman

Composition
- Recorded: April 6, 1949, as "Black Velvet"; December 12, 1949, as "Don'cha Go 'Way Mad"
- Composers: Illinois Jacquet; Jimmy Mundy
- Lyricist: Al Stillman

"Don'cha Go 'Way Mad" is a popular song composed by Illinois Jacquet and Jimmy Mundy, with lyrics written by Al Stillman. It was originally recorded by Illinois Jacquet and His Orchestra as an instrumental on April 6, 1949, as "Black Velvet". Stillman later added lyrics, and Harry James recorded it as "Don'cha Go 'Way Mad" on December 12, 1949, (released in 1950) for Columbia Records (catalog No. 38682).

== Notable recordings ==
- 1950: Ella Fitzgerald and Sy Oliver – recorded for Decca on February 2, 1950 (catalog No. 24917)
- 1957: Julie London, Julie
- 1957: Rosemary Clooney and the Hi-Lo's, Ring Around Rosie
- 1957: Sammy Davis Jr., Sammy Swings
- 1958: Ella Fitzgerald, Ella at the Opera House
- 1996: The Jazz Passengers featuring Debbie Harry and Elvis Costello, Individually Twisted
- 1962: Frank Sinatra, Sinatra and Swingin' Brass
- 1986: Mel Tormé, Mel Tormé, Rob McConnell and the Boss Brass
- 1999: Big Kahuna and the Copa Cats, Big Kahuna

== Recordings as "Black Velvet" ==
- 1958: Sonny Clark, The Art of the Trio
- 1997: Scott Hamilton, After Hours
