= Frank Haynes =

Frank Haynes may refer to:

- Frank Haynes (politician), British politician
- Frank Haynes (musician), American jazz tenor saxophonist
- Frank Jay Haynes, American photographer, publisher, and entrepreneur
