= The Art of the Trio =

Studio album by Sonny Clark
- Released: 1980
- Recorded: October 13, 1957 (#1–3); November 16, 1958 (#4–9); Van Gelder Studio, Hackensack
- Genre: Jazz
- Length: 38:05
- Labels: Blue Note; GXF 3069
- Producer: Alfred Lion

Sonny Clark chronology
Cool Struttin' (1958)	The Art of the Trio (1980)	Blues in the Night (1958)

Alternative cover
- CD reissue

Professional ratings
Review scores
Source	Rating
Allmusic	4/5 stars

The Art of the Trio is a studio album by the pianist Sonny Clark.

It features alternate takes of three October 1957 pieces which originally appeared on Sonny Clark Trio, while the new tracks were recorded on November 16, 1958. The album was released only in Japan in 1980 as GXF 3069, then reissued again in Japan in the 1990s as The 45 Sessions featuring an alternate take of "Gee Baby, Ain't I Good To You?". The tracks #4–9 can be found on the compilation Standards and on the 2014 Japanese release of Blues in the Night; tracks #1–3 are included on the CD reissue of Sonny Clark Trio.

== Track listing ==
1. "Tadd's Delight" [Alternate Take] – 5:01
2. "Two Bass Hit" [Alternate Take] – 4:01
3. "I Didn't Know What Time It Was" (Richard Rodgers, Lorenz Hart) [Alternate Take] – 4:25
4. "Ain't No Use" (Leroy Kirkland, Sidney Wyche) – 4:49
5. "Black Velvet" (Illinois Jacquet, Jimmy Mundy) – 3:23
6. "I'm Just a Lucky So-and-So (Mack David, Duke Ellington) – 4:33
7. "Gee, Baby, Ain't I Good to You" (Andy Razaf, Don Redman) – 4:01
8. "The Breeze and I" (Tutti Camarata, Ernesto Lecuona, Al Stillman) – 4:00
9. "I Can't Give You Anything But Love" (Dorothy Fields, Jimmy McHugh) – 3:52

== Personnel ==
Tracks 1–3

- Sonny Clark – piano
- Paul Chambers – bass
- Philly Joe Jones – drums

Tracks 4–9

- Sonny Clark – piano
- Jymie Merritt – bass
- Wes Landers – drums

== Charts ==
Monthly chart performance for The Art of the Trio
Chart (2026)	Peak position
German Jazz Albums (Offizielle Top 100)	17
