= New Trombone =

Studio album by Curtis Fuller
- Released: December 1957
- Recorded: May 11, 1957
- Studio: Van Gelder Studio, Hackensack, New Jersey
- Genre: Jazz
- Length: 38:44
- Label: Prestige; PRLP 7107
- Producer: Bob Weinstock

Curtis Fuller chronology
New Trombone (1957)	Curtis Fuller with Red Garland (1957)

New Trombone is the debut album by trombonist Curtis Fuller recorded in 1957 and originally released on Prestige Records.

== Reception ==
Professional ratings
Review scores
Source	Rating
Allmusic	4/5 stars
The Penguin Guide to Jazz Recordings	3/4 stars

In his review for AllMusic, Scott Yanow wrote, "Trombonist Curtis Fuller's debut as a leader was a strong start to the 22-year-old's career... all of the musicians fare quite well".

== Track listing ==
All compositions by Curtis Fuller except as indicated

1. "Vonce #5" – 7:40
2. "Transportation Blues" – 8:18
3. "Blue Lawson" - 6:51
4. "Namely You" (Gene de Paul, Johnny Mercer) – 9:25
5. "What Is This Thing Called Love?" (Cole Porter) – 6:30
6. "Alicia" (bonus track on CD)

== Personnel ==
- Curtis Fuller – trombone
- Sonny Red – alto saxophone
- Hank Jones – piano
- Doug Watkins – bass
- Louis Hayes – drums
