= Bash! (Dave Bailey album) =

Studio album by The Dave Bailey Sextet
- Released: 1961
- Recorded: October 4, 1961
- Studio: Peter Ind Studio, NYC
- Genre: Jazz
- Length: 36:01
- Label: Jazzline JAZ 33-01; Xanadu 5011; Black Lion BLCD 760146
- Producer: Fred Norsworthy

Dave Bailey chronology
Reaching Out (1961)	Bash! (1961)	2 Feet in the Gutter (1962)

Osmosis Cover

Bash! (also released as Modern Mainstream) is an album by jazz drummer Dave Bailey which was originally released on the Jazzline label in 1961. Different releases of the same material have appeared under the names of sidemen on the date. The album features pianist Tommy Flanagan and was re-released as Tommy Flanagan Trio And Sextet on the Onyx label and on the Xanadu label in 1973. It was also re-released under trumpeter Kenny Dorham's name as Osmosis on CD in 1990 on the Black Lion label with 4 alternate takes.

== Reception ==
Professional ratings
Review scores
Source	Rating
DownBeat	(Original Lp release)
Allmusic	3/5 stars

DownBeat magazine's March 1, 1962 review stated: "Bash! presents a relaxed and enjoyable blowing session..." Allmusic awarded the album 3 stars.

== Track listing ==
1. "Osmosis" (Osie Johnson) - 10:28
2. "Soul Support" (Norris Turney) - 5:10
3. "Grand Street" (Sonny Rollins) - 6:00
4. "Like Someone in Love" (Johnny Burke, Jimmy van Heusen) - 3:59
5. "Oscar for Oscar" (Kenny Dorham) - 6:18
6. "B.M.T. Express" (Rudy Stevenson) - 7:33
7. "Just Friends" (John Klenner, Sam M. Lewis) - 3:39
8. "Soul Support" [take 2] (Turney) - 5:08 Bonus track on CD reissue
9. "Grand Street" [take 1] (Rollins) - 5:59 Bonus track on CD reissue
10. "Like Someone in Love" [take 2] (Burke, van Heusen) - 3:12 Bonus track on CD reissue
11. "Osmosis" [take 1] (Johnson) - 11:46 Bonus track on CD reissue

== Personnel ==
- Dave Bailey - drums
- Kenny Dorham - trumpet
- Curtis Fuller - trombone
- Frank Haynes - tenor saxophone
- Tommy Flanagan - piano - trio 4,7 and 10
- Ben Tucker - bass
