= Groovin' with Golson =

Studio album by Benny Golson
- Released: 1959
- Recorded: August 28, 1959
- Studio: Van Gelder Studio, Englewood Cliffs, New Jersey
- Genre: Jazz
- Length: 34:01
- Label: New Jazz; NJLP 8220
- Producer: Esmond Edwards

Benny Golson chronology
The Curtis Fuller Jazztet (1959)	Groovin' with Golson (1959)	Winchester Special (1959)

Groovin' with Golson is the sixth album by saxophonist Benny Golson featuring performances recorded in 1959 and originally released on the New Jazz label.

== Reception ==
Professional ratings
Review scores
Source	Rating
Allmusic	3/5 stars
DownBeat	4/5 stars
The Penguin Guide to Jazz Recordings	4/4 stars

The Allmusic review by Scott Yanow states, "the hard bop music does indeed groove in its own fashion".

== Track listing ==
All compositions by Benny Golson except where noted.

1. "My Blues House" - 9:25
2. "Drum Boogie" (Roy Eldridge, Gene Krupa) - 3:59
3. "I Didn't Know What Time It Was" (Richard Rodgers, Lorenz Hart) - 5:25
4. "The Stroller" - 9:18
5. "Yesterdays" (Jerome Kern, Otto Harbach) - 5:54

== Personnel ==
- Benny Golson - tenor saxophone
- Curtis Fuller - trombone
- Ray Bryant - piano
- Paul Chambers - bass
- Art Blakey - drums
