= Imagination (Curtis Fuller album) =

Studio album by The Curtis Fuller Sextette
- Released: 1960
- Recorded: December 17, 1959
- Studio: Van Gelder Studio, Englewood Cliffs
- Genre: Jazz
- Length: 37:27
- Label: Savoy; MG 12144
- Producer: Herman Lubinsky

Curtis Fuller chronology
The Curtis Fuller Jazztet (1959)	Imagination (1960)	Images of Curtis Fuller (1960)

Imagination is an album by American trombonist Curtis Fuller's Sextette recorded in 1959 and released on the Savoy label. Noted for being the first professional recording of pianist McCoy Tyner.

== Reception ==
Professional ratings
Review scores
Source	Rating
Allmusic	4/5 stars
New Record Mirror	3/5 stars

The Allmusic website awarded the album 4 stars stating "Although the material (other than the lone standard "Imagination") is unfamiliar, the chord changes inspire the players to create some fine solos. Easily recommended to hard bop fans lucky enough to find this album".

== Track listing ==
All compositions by Curtis Fuller except where noted

1. "Kachin" - 6:57
2. "Bang Bang" - 6:11
3. "Imagination" (Johnny Burke, Jimmy Van Heusen) - 6:50
4. "Blues de Funk" - 9:10
5. "Lido Road" - 8:23

== Personnel ==
- Curtis Fuller - trombone, arranger
- Benny Golson - tenor saxophone
- Thad Jones - trumpet
- McCoy Tyner - piano
- Jimmy Garrison - bass
- Dave Bailey - drums
