= Stu Martin (drummer) =

American drummer

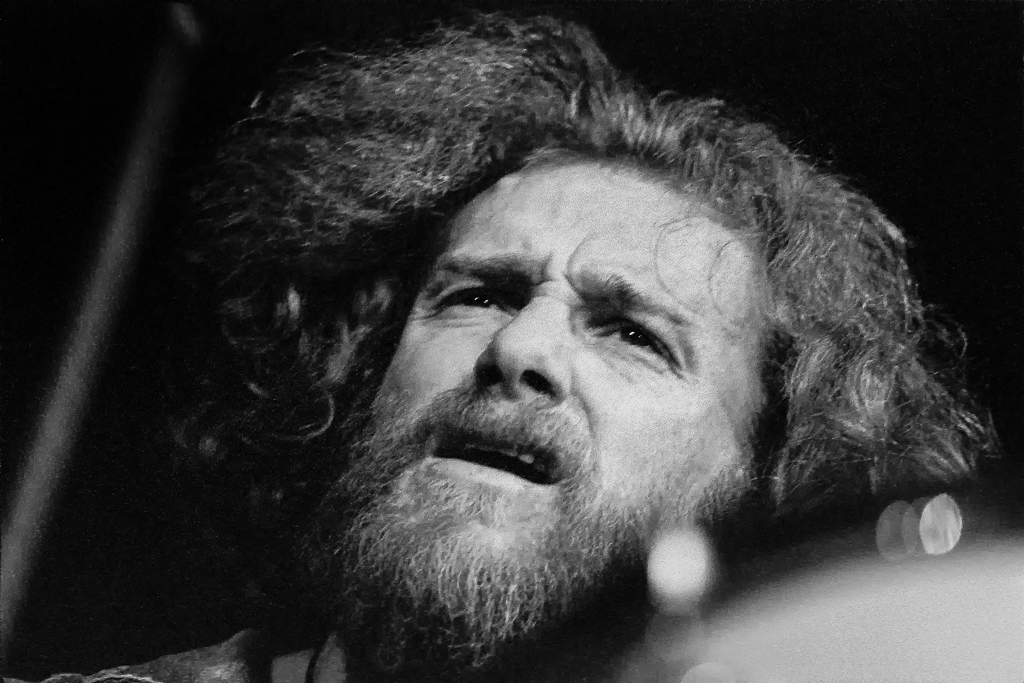
- Stuart Victor Martin

Background information
- Born: Stuart Victor Martin; June 11, 1938; Liberty, New York, U.S.
- Died: June 12, 1980 (aged 42) Paris, France
- Genres: Jazz
- Occupation: Musician
- Instrument: Drums
- Years active: 1950s–1979

Stuart Victor Martin (June 11, 1938 – June 12, 1980) was an American jazz drummer.

== Career ==
Martin was a professional musician by the age of sixteen when he played drums for the big bands of Count Basie, Jimmy Dorsey, Les and Larry Elgart, Duke Ellington, Maynard Ferguson, Quincy Jones, and Billy May. In the 1960s he worked with Gary Burton, Donald Byrd, Curtis Fuller, Herbie Hancock, Oliver Nelson, Sonny Rollins, Steve Swallow, and Lambert, Hendricks, and Ross. He was a member of a band in West Germany that consisted of Lee Konitz, Albert Mangelsdorff, and Attila Zoller and in a band with Rolf Kuhn and Joachim Kuhn. Martin was a member of The Trio with Barre Phillips and John Surman, then as a member with Charlie Mariano. In the 1970s he recorded with Carla Bley, Slide Hampton, and John McLaughlin.

In 1975, the Trio went to Paris to do a collaborative project with the Paris Opera orchestra and the Carolyn Carlson Dance Company. After this project, he continued to play with the Trio and also toured with the rock band New York Gong.

Martin died at the age of 42 in Paris as the result of a heart attack. His legacy's survived by his son Zeke Martin and his grandsons Isaiah Martin and Jeremiah Martin

== Discography ==
=== As leader ===
- Alors with Barre Phillips, Michel Portal, John Surman (Futura, 1970)
- Where Fortune Smiles with John McLaughlin (Dawn, 1971)
- Conflagration, The Trio with Phillips and Surman (1971)
- Live at Woodstock Town Hall with John Surman (Dawn, 1975)
- Mountainscapes with Barre Phillips (ECM, 1976)
- Sunrise (EPM, 1996)

=== As sideman ===
With Curtis Fuller

- Boss of the Soul-Stream Trombone (Warwick, 1960)
- The Magnificent Trombone of Curtis Fuller (Epic, 1961)

With Quincy Jones

- I Dig Dancers (Mercury, 1961)
- Newport '61 (Mercury, 1961)
- The Great Wide World of Quincy Jones: Live! (1961)
- The Quintessence (Impulse!, 1962)
- Quincy Plays for Pussycats (Mercury, 1959-65 [1965])

With Sonny Rollins

- All the Things You Are (1964)
- The Standard Sonny Rollins (RCA Victor, 1964)

With Tomasz Stańko, Tomasz Szukalski

- Double Concerto for Five Soloists and Orchestra (Poljazz, 1972)

With Tomasz Stańko, Janusz Stefański

- Fish Face (Poljazz, 1974)

With others

- 1960 Newport Suite, Maynard Ferguson (Roulette)
- 1960 The Hottest New Group in Jazz, Lambert, Hendricks & Ross (Columbia)
- 1961 Fast Livin' Blues, Jon Hendricks
- 1966 New Advanced Jazz, Valdo Williams (Savoy)
- 1969 Smashing Thirds, Joe Turner (MPS)
- 1969 Zo-Ko-Ma, Lee Konitz
- 1971 Tales of the Algonquin, John Surman/John Warren
- 1971 Ossiach Live John McLaughlin (BASF)
- 1975 13, Carla Bley/Michael Mantler
- 1977 A Matter Of Taste, Mumps (Albert Mangelsdorff, John Surman, Barre Phillips)
- 1978 Cloud Line Blue, Karin Krog (P-Vine)
