= Jazz ...It's Magic! =

Studio album by Curtis Fuller
- Released: January 1958
- Recorded: September 5, 1957
- Studio: Van Gelder Studio, Hackensack, New Jersey
- Genre: Jazz
- Length: 39:53
- Label: Regent; MG 6055

Curtis Fuller chronology
Bone & Bari (1957)	Jazz ...It's Magic! (1958)	Curtis Fuller Volume 3 (1958)

Jazz ...It's Magic! is an album by American jazz trombonist Curtis Fuller, released in January 1958 on the Regent label, a subsidiary of Savoy Records.

== Reception ==
Professional ratings
Review scores
Source	Rating
AllMusic	3/5 stars

The AllMusic review by Jim Todd awarded the album 3 stars out of 5 and stated: "On Fuller's Jazz...It's Magic, the hard bop prototype is still under refinement, but it's easy to enjoy the music in its essential elements: elegant, bluesy melodies; earthy, yet sophisticated, solo work; and fresh treatments of standards."

== Track listing ==
All compositions by Curtis Fuller except as indicated

1. "Two Ton" – 4:48
2. "Medley: It's Magic/My One and Only Love/They Didn't Believe Me" (Jule Styne, Sammy Cahn/ Guy Wood, Robert Mellin/Jerome Kern, Herbert Reynolds) – 13:41
3. "Soul Station" – 5:42
4. "Club Car" – 7:15
5. "Upper Berth" (Frank Foster) – 8:32

== Personnel ==
- Curtis Fuller – trombone
- Sonny Red – alto saxophone
- Tommy Flanagan – piano
- George Tucker – bass
- Louis Hayes – drums
