= Smokin' (Curtis Fuller album) =

Studio album by Curtis Fuller
- Released: 1972
- Recorded: 1972
- Studio: New York City
- Genre: Jazz
- Label: Mainstream; MRL 370
- Producer: Bob Shad

Curtis Fuller chronology
Crankin' (1971)	Smokin' (1972)	Four on the Outside (1978)

Smokin' is an album by American trombonist Curtis Fuller recorded in 1972 and released on the Mainstream label.

== Reception ==
Professional ratings
Review scores
Source	Rating
Allmusic	3.5/5 stars

Allmusic awarded the album 3½ stars with its review by Scott Yanow stating, "Trombonist Curtis Fuller's second Mainstream album has some dated electronics and funk rhythms, although there are some worthwhile solos".

== Trivia ==
Jazz disc jockey Joe Lex uses "Jacque's Groove" as the theme song for his show "Dr. Joe's Groove" on WPPM-LP, Philadelphia.

== Track listing ==
All compositions by Curtis Fuller except where noted

1. "Smokin'" - 11:10
2. "Jacque's Groove" - 6:08
3. "Sop City" - 7:58
4. "People Places and Things" - 7:14
5. "Stella by Starlight" (Victor Young, Ned Washington) - 7:29

== Personnel ==
- Curtis Fuller - trombone
- Jimmy Heath - soprano saxophone, tenor saxophone
- Bill Hardman - trumpet
- Ted Dunbar - guitar
- Cedar Walton - piano, electric piano
- Mickey Bass - bass, electric bass
- Billy Higgins - drums
