= My Conception =

1979 album by jazz pianist Sonny Clark

Studio album by Sonny Clark
- Released: 1979
- Recorded: December 8, 1957; March 29, 1959; Van Gelder Studio, Hackensack
- Genre: Jazz
- Length: 39:36 original LP; 61:16 2000 CD reissue
- Labels: Blue Note; GXF 3056
- Producer: Alfred Lion

Sonny Clark chronology
Blues in the Night (1958)	My Conception (1979)	Leapin' and Lopin' (1961)

Alternative cover
- 2000 CD edition

Professional ratings
Review scores
Source	Rating
Allmusic	4/5 stars
The Penguin Guide to Jazz Recordings	3.5/4 stars

My Conception is an album by jazz pianist Sonny Clark, recorded for the Blue Note label and performed by Clark with Donald Byrd, Hank Mobley, Paul Chambers, and Art Blakey. It was originally released in 1979 in Japan, as GXF 3056, featuring six tracks recorded in 1959 including an alternate take of "Royal Flush", a track that had appeared on the album Cool Struttin'. The 2000 limited CD reissue also comprised the three additional tracks originally recorded for Sonny Clark Quintets, an album which never saw the light of the day until being released later only in Japan.

The album was awarded 4 stars in an Allmusic review by Michael G. Nastos which stated "Sonny Clark's conception of modern jazz is not far removed from his peer group of the late '50s, in that advanced melodic and harmonic ideas override the basic precepts of swing and simplicity. What sets Clark apart from other jazz pianists lies in his conception of democracy to allow his bandmates to steam straight ahead on compositions he has written with them in mind... Except the extraordinary Leapin' and Lopin', this album of contrasts, depth, and spirit showcases Clark's dual concepts brilliantly, and is only a half step below his best".

== Track listing ==
All compositions by Sonny Clark

1. "Junka" - 7:30
2. "Blues Blue" - 7:18
3. "Minor Meeting" [Second Version] - 6:46
4. "Royal Flush" [Second Version] - 7:00
5. "Some Clark Bars" - 6:18
6. "My Conception" - 4:44

Bonus tracks on CD:

7. "Minor Meeting" [First Version] - 6:54
8. "Eastern Incident" - 8:14
9. "Little Sonny" - 6:32

Recorded on December 8, 1957 (tracks 7–9) and March 29, 1959 (tracks 1–6).

== Personnel ==
- Sonny Clark - piano
- Donald Byrd - (tracks 1–6) trumpet
- Hank Mobley (tracks 1–6), Clifford Jordan (tracks 7–9) - tenor saxophone
- Kenny Burrell - guitar (tracks 7–9)
- Paul Chambers - bass
- Art Blakey (tracks 1–6), Pete LaRoca (tracks 7–9) - drums

=== Production ===
- Alfred Lion - producer
- Reid Miles - design
- Rudy Van Gelder - engineer
- Francis Wolff - photography
