= Soul Trombone =

Studio album by Curtis Fuller
- Released: 1961
- Recorded: November 15, 16 & 17, 1961
- Studio: Capitol Studios, New York City
- Genre: Jazz
- Length: 38:36
- Label: Impulse! A/AS 13
- Producer: Bob Thiele

Curtis Fuller chronology
South American Cookin' (1961)	Soul Trombone (1961)	Cabin in the Sky (1962)

Soul Trombone is an album by American jazz trombonist Curtis Fuller featuring performances recorded in 1961 for the Impulse! label.

== Reception ==
The Allmusic review by Ken Dryden awarded the album 4 stars stating "The solos on this hard bop disc are superb, with Fuller giving his musicians plenty of room, while his own work is first-rate. Three of the six pieces are originals and even if they never caught on, there is no filler present anywhere".

Professional ratings
Review scores
Source	Rating
Allmusic	4/5 stars
Down Beat	(Original Lp release)

== Track listing ==
All compositions by Curtis Fuller except as indicated

1. "The Clan" – 6:19
2. "In the Wee Small Hours of the Morning" (Bob Hilliard, David Mann) – 4:57
3. "Newdles" – 7:40
4. "The Breeze and I" (Ernesto Lecuona, Al Stillman) – 4:03
5. "Dear Old Stockholm" (Traditional) – 9:07
6. "Ladies' Night" – 6:30

- Recorded on November 15, 1961 (track 1), November 16, 1961 (tracks 2 & 3), and November 17, 1961 (tracks 4–6)

== Personnel ==
- Curtis Fuller – trombone
- Freddie Hubbard – trumpet
- Jimmy Heath – tenor saxophone
- Cedar Walton – piano
- Jymie Merritt – bass
- Jimmy Cobb (tracks 1–4,6), G. T. Hogan (track 5) – drums
