= Paa Kow =

Ghanaian highlife musician (died 2025)

Paa Kow Isaac Ninson
- Born: Enyan, Denkyira, Ghana
- Died: 23 December 2025 Enyan, Denkyira, Ghana
- Genres: Afro-fusion, world fusion, highlife
- Occupations: Musician, composer, record producer, bandleader
- Instruments: Drum set, bass guitar
- Website: www.paakowmusic.com

Paa Kow, born as Paa Kow Isaac Ninson (died 23 December 2025), was a Ghanaian highlife and Afro-fusion drummer, composer and bandleader.

== Early life ==
Paa Kow grew up in a musical family in the small village of Enyan Denkyira, near Cape Coast, Ghana. Paa Kow began playing and performing music at the age of five. His uncle and mother were both singers in a touring concert band called the Enidado Professional Band. It was with this band that Paa Kow first began performing, first playing cowbell and congas and then eventually moving to the drum set by age seven. Due to the cost and lack of access to instruments, he would fashion his own drums out of metal cans, wire, and a fertilizer bag as a bass drum, which he used to practice for hours every day. He also had to build his own drum pedal using an old sandal, a door hinge and some string.

While touring the country with his uncle's band, other band leaders began to take notice of the prodigious young drummer and Paa Kow was soon playing with other known groups, eventually catching the eye of Highlife legend Amakye Dede. At age 14, Paa Kow was invited to Accra to join Dede's group. After some years in Accra playing with Amakye, his talent became widely recognized and Paa Kow was invited to play with other major Highlife artists in the country including Kojo Antwi, George Darko and Nat Brew taking him on tours to Switzerland, Scotland, Belgium, Amsterdam, Ivory Coast, Liberia, Togo, Egypt, and Nigeria.

== Career ==
In 2007, Paa Kow was invited to Boulder, Colorado as a guest artist of the University of Colorado music school to perform with West African Highlife Ensemble directed by Kwasi Ampene. After, he returned to Ghana for a short time and then emigrated to the US later that year following an invitation from musicians he had met while at the university.

After moving to the United States, Paa Kow was no longer just a session drummer as he had begun to compose his own music. His debut album Hand Go Hand Come was released in 2012 followed by Ask in 2014. His third album Cookpot was released in October 2017. Notable artists he has performed with in the US include Victor Wooten, Michael Kang, Brad Goode and John Gunther.

== Personal life and death ==
Paa Kow had two sons. He died on 23 December 2025.
