= A Garland of Red =

Studio album by Red Garland Trio
- Released: Early January 1957
- Recorded: August 17, 1956
- Studios: Van Gelder Studio, Hackensack, New Jersey
- Genre: Jazz
- Length: 41:40
- Label: Prestige
- Producer: Bob Weinstock

Red Garland Trio chronology
A Garland of Red (1957)	Red Garland's Piano (1956)

Professional ratings
Review scores
Source	Rating
AllMusic	4.5/5 stars
Disc	4/5 stars
The Rolling Stone Jazz Record Guide	3/5 stars
The Penguin Guide to Jazz Recordings	3/4 stars
DownBeat	3.5/5 stars

A Garland of Red is the debut album by pianist Red Garland, recorded in 1956 and released on the Prestige label.

== Reception ==
In his review for AllMusic, Scott Yanow stated: "Thirty-three at the time of this, his first recording as a leader, pianist Red Garland already had his distinctive style fully formed and had been with the Miles Davis Quintet for a year... Red Garland recorded frequently during the 1956-62 period and virtually all of his trio recordings are consistently enjoyable, this one being no exception."

== Track listing ==
1. "A Foggy Day" (George Gershwin, Ira Gershwin) - 4:51
2. "My Romance" (Lorenz Hart, Richard Rodgers) - 6:51
3. "What Is This Thing Called Love?" (Cole Porter) - 4:53
4. "Makin' Whoopee" (Walter Donaldson, Gus Kahn) - 4:15
5. "September in the Rain" (Al Dubin, Harry Warren) - 4:48
6. "Little Girl Blue" (Hart, Rodgers) - 5:07
7. "Constellation" (Charlie Parker) - 3:31
8. "Blue Red" (Red Garland) - 7:38

== Personnel ==
Musicians

- Red Garland - piano
- Paul Chambers - bass
- Art Taylor - drums

Production

- Ira Gitler – liner Notes
- Bob Weinstock – supervision
- Rudy Van Gelder – recording
- Tom Hannan – cover design
- Esmond Edwards – photography
