= Sliding Easy =

Studio album by Curtis Fuller
- Released: End of October 1959
- Recorded: March 12, 1959
- Studio: Nola's Penthouse Sound Studios, New York City
- Genre: Jazz
- Length: 35:16
- Label: United Artists; UAL 4041
- Producer: Tom Wilson

Curtis Fuller chronology
Another Monday Night at Birdland (1959)	Sliding Easy (1959)	Blues-ette (1959)

Sliding Easy is an album by American trombonist Curtis Fuller, recorded in 1959 and released on the United Artists label.

== Reception ==
Professional ratings
Review scores
Source	Rating
AllMusic	3/5 stars

AllMusic awarded the album 3 stars.

== Track listing ==
All compositions by Curtis Fuller except as indicated

1. "Bit of Heaven" - 5:25
2. "Down Home" - 4:05
3. "I Wonder Where Our Love Has Gone" (Buddy Johnson) - 5:52
4. "Bongo Bop" (Charlie Parker) - 7:50
5. "When Lights Are Low" (Benny Carter, Spencer Williams) - 6:55
6. "C.T.A." (Jimmy Heath) - 5:09

== Personnel ==
- Curtis Fuller - trombone
- Lee Morgan - trumpet
- Hank Mobley - tenor saxophone
- Tommy Flanagan - piano
- Paul Chambers - bass
- Elvin Jones - drums
- Benny Golson (tracks 1, 3, 4 & 5), Gigi Gryce (tracks 2 & 6) - arranger
