= Keep It Simple (Curtis Fuller album) =

Studio album by Curtis Fuller
- Released: March 15, 2005
- Recorded: September 28 & 29, 2003
- Studio: Rocky Mountain Studios, Hilton Head, Carolina
- Genre: Jazz
- Length: 54:58
- Label: Savant; SCD 2062
- Producer: Jacey Falk

Curtis Fuller chronology
Up Jumped Spring (2004)	Keep It Simple (2005)	I Will Tell Her (2010)

Keep It Simple is a studio album by American jazz trombonist Curtis Fuller recorded in 2003 and released by the Savant label in 2005.

== Reception ==
Professional ratings
Review scores
Source	Rating
Allmusic	3.5/5 stars
The Penguin Guide to Jazz Recordings	3/4 stars

Matt Collar of Allmusic said: "Fuller once again reunites with a former Art Blakey's Jazz Messengers alum for a set of standards and original compositions. Joining Fuller this time is tenor saxophonist Javon Jackson, who played with Blakey from the late '80s until the drummer's death in 1990. Together they reignite the fiery, soulful Jazz Messenger aesthetic." In his review for JazzTimes, Aaron Steinberg wrote: "There's nothing brash or unconventional about trombonist Curtis Fuller's latest, Keep It Simple. Still active and playing well at 70, Fuller hews close to the Jazz Messengers-style bebop and modal jazz he’s been playing since the ’50s. Fuller brought a solid band into the studio and delivers a casual, satisfying record of standards and modal originals... the recording belongs to Fuller. His hazy tone and curt, snapping melodic lines sound more and more handsome as the recording goes on". In The Observer, Dave Gelly noted: "There is a ripeness about Fuller's tone that makes him instantly recognisable. It comes into full bloom during the slow ballads, such as 'Loverman', which are highlights of this excellent set, and blends perfectly with Jackson's slightly edgy sound."

== Track listing ==
All compositions by Curtis Fuller except where noted

1. Spoken Intro – 0:04
2. "The Court" – 2:55
3. "Maze" – 6:33
4. "Girl Talk" (Neal Hefti, Bobby Troup) – 6:00
5. "A La Mode" – 3:53
6. "Lover Man" (Jimmy Davis, Ram Ramirez, Jimmy Sherman) – 9:57
7. "Western Sunrise" (Doug Carn) – 5:45
8. "Arabia" – 3:45
9. "I Didn't Know What Time It Was" (Richard Rodgers, Lorenz Hart) – 6:03
10. "Diane" (Javon Jackson) – 6:59
11. "It's You or No One" (Jule Styne, Sammy Cahn) – 3:04

== Personnel ==
- Curtis Fuller – trombone (tracks 2, 3, 5-9 & 11)
- Javon Jackson – tenor saxophone (tracks 2, 3, 5, 6 & 8-11)
- Doug Carn - piano
- Rodney Jordan – bass
- Fritz Wise - drums
