= Curtis Fuller with Red Garland =

Studio album by Curtis Fuller with Red Garland
- Released: Early April 1963
- Recorded: May 14, 1957; Van Gelder Studio, Hackensack, New Jersey
- Genre: Jazz
- Length: 44:02
- Label: New Jazz; NJLP 8277
- Producer: Bob Weinstock

Curtis Fuller chronology
New Trombone (1957)	Curtis Fuller with Red Garland (1963)	Curtis Fuller and Hampton Hawes with French Horns (1957)

Red Garland chronology
Red Garland's Piano (1957)	Curtis Fuller with Red Garland (1957)	Red Garland Revisited! (1957)

Curtis Fuller with Red Garland is an album by trombonist Curtis Fuller with pianist Red Garland recorded in 1957 and originally released on the New Jazz label, a subsidiary of Prestige Records in 1963.

== Reception ==
Professional ratings
Review scores
Source	Rating
Allmusic	4/5 stars
The Penguin Guide to Jazz Recordings	3.5/4 stars

In his review for Allmusic, Scott Yanow stated "Despite the overly critical liner notes (written in 1962), this is an excellent hard-bop oriented date".

== Track listing ==
1. "Seeing Red" (Sonny Red, Barry Harris) - 7:35
2. "Stormy Weather" (Harold Arlen, Ted Koehler) - 7:00
3. "Cashmere" (Curtis Fuller) - 7:17
4. "Slenderella" (Sonny Red) - 6:45
5. "Moonlight Becomes You" (Johnny Burke, Jimmy Van Heusen) - 7:43
6. "Roc and Troll" (Teddy Charles) - 7:42

== Personnel ==
- Curtis Fuller - trombone - except track 5
- Red Garland - piano
- Sonny Red - alto saxophone - except track 2
- Paul Chambers - bass
- Louis Hayes - drums
