= The Curtis Fuller Jazztet =

Studio album by Curtis Fuller with Benny Golson
- Released: 1959
- Recorded: August 25, 1959
- Studio: Van Gelder Studio, Englewood Cliffs, New Jersey
- Genre: Jazz
- Length: 40:20
- Label: Savoy; MG 12143
- Producer: Herman Lubinsky

Curtis Fuller chronology
Blues-ette (1959)	The Curtis Fuller Jazztet (1959)	Imagination (1959)

Benny Golson chronology
Gone with Golson (1959)	The Curtis Fuller Jazztet (1959)	Groovin' with Golson (1959)

The Curtis Fuller Jazztet is an album by American trombonist Curtis Fuller with saxophonist Benny Golson, recorded in 1959 and released on the Savoy label.

== Reception ==
Professional ratings
Review scores
Source	Rating
AllMusic	3/5 stars

AllMusic stated: "The Curtis Fuller Jazztet is a relaxed hard bop set featuring many of the young stars of the day."

== Track listing ==
All compositions by Curtis Fuller, except where indicated.

1. "It's All Right With Me" (Cole Porter) - 7:39
2. "Wheatleith Hall" (Dizzy Gillespie) - 14:06
3. "I'll Walk Alone" (Sammy Cahn, Jule Styne) - 6:57
4. "Arabia" - 6:36
5. "Judy's Dilemma" - 5:52

== Personnel ==
- Curtis Fuller - trombone
- Benny Golson - tenor saxophone
- Lee Morgan - trumpet
- Wynton Kelly - piano
- Paul Chambers - bass
- Charlie Persip - drums
