= Blues-ette =

Studio album by Curtis Fuller
- Released: February 1960
- Recorded: May 21, 1959
- Studio: Van Gelder Studio, Hackensack
- Genre: Jazz
- Length: 36:45
- Label: Savoy; MG 12141
- Producer: Ozzie Cadena

Curtis Fuller chronology
Sliding Easy (1959)	Blues-ette (1960)	The Curtis Fuller Jazztet (1959)

Blues-ette is an album by American trombonist Curtis Fuller recorded in 1959 and released on the Savoy label.

== Reception ==
Professional ratings
Review scores
Source	Rating
Allmusic	4.5/5 stars
DownBeat	4/5 stars

The Allmusic website awarded the album 4½ stars stating "Sessions in any genre of music are all too often described as "sublime," but seldom has that description been better deserved than with this relaxed hard bop classic... Any serious jazz collection is incomplete without this record. Period".

== Track listing ==
All compositions by Curtis Fuller except where noted

1. "Five Spot After Dark" (Benny Golson) - 5:18
2. "Undecided" (Sydney Robin, Charlie Shavers) - 7:09
3. "Blues-ette" - 5:31
4. "Minor Vamp" (Golson) - 5:12
5. "Love Your Spell Is Everywhere" (Edmund Goulding, Elsie Janis) - 7:07
6. "Twelve-Inch" - 6:28

== Personnel ==
- Curtis Fuller - trombone
- Benny Golson - tenor saxophone
- Tommy Flanagan - piano
- Jimmy Garrison - bass
- Al Harewood - drums
