= Red Garland Revisited! =

Studio album by Red Garland
- Released: 1969
- Recorded: May 24, 1957
- Studio: Van Gelder Studio, Hackensack, New Jersey
- Genre: Jazz
- Length: 50:31
- Label: Prestige; PR 7658
- Producer: Bob Weinstock

Red Garland chronology
Curtis Fuller with Red Garland (1957)	Red Garland Revisited! (1969)	Sugan (1957)

Red Garland Revisited! is an album by pianist Red Garland featuring tracks recorded in 1957 which were first released on the Prestige label in 1969.

== Reception ==
Professional ratings
Review scores
Source	Rating
AllMusic	4/5 stars
The Penguin Guide to Jazz Recordings	3.5/4 stars

In his review for AllMusic, Scott Yanow called it "Predictably excellent music".

== Track listing ==
1. "Billy Boy" (Traditional) – 6:20
2. "Everybody's Somebody's Fool" (Ace Adams, Regina Adams, Gladys Hampton) – 7:57
3. "Four" (Miles Davis) – 5:17
4. "You Keep Coming Back Like a Song" (Irving Berlin) – 5:35
5. "Hey Now" (Red Garland) – 3:45
6. "(I'm Afraid) The Masquerade Is Over" (Herb Magidson, Allie Wrubel) – 8:45
7. "Walkin'" (Richard Carpenter) – 7:08
8. "It Could Happen to You" (Johnny Burke, Jimmy Van Heusen) – 5:44

== Personnel ==
- Red Garland – piano
- Kenny Burrell – guitar (tracks 3 & 7)
- Paul Chambers – bass
- Art Taylor – drums
