= Samba Para Dos =

Studio album by Lalo Schifrin and Bob Brookmeyer
- Released: 1963
- Recorded: February 7, 1963; New York City
- Genre: Jazz
- Length: 32:03
- Label: Verve; V-8543
- Producer: Creed Taylor

Lalo Schifrin chronology
| Piano, Strings and Bossa Nova (1962) | Samba Para Dos (1963) | Between Broadway & Hollywood (1963) |

Bob Brookmeyer chronology
| Trombone Jazz Samba (1962) | Samba Para Dos (1963) | Bob Brookmeyer and Friends (1964) |

Samba Para Dos is an album by Argentine composer, pianist and conductor Lalo Schifrin and American trombonist Bob Brookmeyer recorded in 1963 and released on the Verve label.

== Reception ==
The Allmusic review states "Although this may not be considered an essential LP by the average jazz fan, it is well worth acquiring".

Professional ratings
Review scores
| Source | Rating |
|---|---|
| Allmusic | 3/5 stars |

== Track listing ==
1. "Samba Para Dos" (Lalo Schifrin) - 10:00
2. "What Kind of Fool Am I?" (Leslie Bricusse, Anthony Newley) - 2:58
3. "I Get a Kick Out of You" (Cole Porter) - 4:37
4. "Just One of Those Things" (Porter) - 3:25
5. "Time After Time" (Sammy Cahn, Jule Styne) - 3:28
6. "It's All Right with Me" (Porter) - 2:30
7. "My Funny Valentine" (Lorenz Hart, Richard Rodgers) - 2:00
8. "But Not for Me" (George Gershwin, Ira Gershwin) - 3:05
- Recorded in New York City on February 7, 1963

== Personnel ==
- Lalo Schifrin - piano, arranger
- Bob Brookmeyer - valve trombone
- Frank Rehak - trombone
- Leo Wright - alto saxophone, flute
- Phil Woods, Jerome Richardson - alto saxophone
- Zoot Sims, Al Cohn - tenor saxophone
- Romeo Penque - bass clarinet
- Danny Bank - baritone saxophone
- Jimmy Raney - guitar
- Ben Tucker - bass
- Dave Bailey - drums
- Jose Paulo - percussion
- Carmelita Koehler - cello
