= Gemini (Les Spann album) =

Studio album by Les Spann
- Released: 1961
- Recorded: December 8 and 16, 1960
- Studios: Plaza Sound, New York City
- Genres: Jazz, cool jazz, hard bop
- Length: 39:27
- Label: Jazzland
- Producer: Orrin Keepnews

Professional ratings
Review scores
Source	Rating
AllMusic	4/5 stars
The Penguin Guide to Jazz	3/4 stars
The Virgin Encyclopedia of Jazz	3/5 stars

Gemini is an album by American jazz guitarist and flutist Les Spann released in 1961. It is Spann's only studio album as a leader, recorded when he was playing as a sideman with Dizzy Gillespie's quintet and Quincy Jones' big band. The title of the album corresponds to Spann's zodiac sign, born on May 23, 1932. For this work Spann led a quintet formed by Julius Watkins (French horn), Tommy Flanagan (piano), Sam Jones (double bass) and two drummers sharing the two recording dates, Albert "Tootie" Heath and Louis Hayes.

The eight tracks of this album were taped in two recording sessions in which Spann demonstrated his playing skills on both instruments: with flute on the tracks on Dec. 8, with Tootie Heath on drums, and with guitar on Dec. 16, with Louis Hayes on drums.

In 1961 Jazzland Records, a subsidiary of Riverside Records, released the first edition on vinyl LP and in 2001 the label Original Jazz Classics reissued it in compact disc, which was digitally remastered at Fantasy Studios.

== Reception ==
Alex Henderson of Allmusic regrets that this musician did not leave more recordings as a leader and considers that Gemini is "an excellent hard bop date" where "Spann gives 100 percent at both sessions", describing his style here bluesy and expressive as a guitarist but equally impressive when he picks up the flute while Marc Myers, historian and contributing journalist of The Wall Street Journal believes that the album's producer, Orrin Keepnews, had great musical instincts for this recording it in 1960: "Listening to it today, the entire album is superbly constructed by Spann, and the merged sound of guitar, flute and horn is rich, thoughtful and mellifluous".

For Richard Cook and Brian Morton at The Penguin Guide to Jazz "the curious contrast in the leader's guitar and flute styles is used quite effectively, with a smart rhythm section", although they criticize that in the final mix his guitar "sounds thin and hidden a lot of the way".

== Track listing ==
No.	Title	Length
1.	"Smile" (Donald Heywood)	6:10
2.	"Con Alma" (Dizzie Gillespie)	3:33
3.	"Q'S Dues Blues" (Les Spann)	6:11
4.	"It Might as Well Be Spring" (Rodgers - Hammerstein)	4:41
5.	"Stockholm Sweetnin'" (Quincy Jones)	5:31
6.	"Blues For Gemini" (Julius Watkins)	4:51
7.	"Afterthought" (Les Spann)	5:04
8.	"(There Is) No Greater Love" (Jones - Symes)	4:46

== Album cover ==
The album cover is by Riverside Records designer Ken Deardoff and the main image is a black and white photograph by Lawrence N. Shustak, showing a smiling Les Spann with a flute and a lit cigarette next to a Guild guitar model Stuart A-500.

== Personnel ==
- Les Spann – flute (tracks# 1, 4, 6 and 7), guitar (tracks# 2, 3, 5 and 8)
- Julius Watkins – French horn
- Tommy Flanagan – piano
- Sam Jones – bass
- Albert Heath – drums (tracks# 1, 4, 6 and 7)
- Louis Hayes – drums (tracks# 2, 3, 5 and 8)
