= South American Cookin' =

Studio album by Curtis Fuller Quintet featuring Zoot Sims
- Released: 1961
- Recorded: August 23, 1961
- Studio: New York City
- Genre: Jazz
- Length: 39:24
- Label: Epic; LA 16020
- Producer: Mike Berniker

Curtis Fuller chronology
The Magnificent Trombone of Curtis Fuller (1961)	South American Cookin' (1961)	Soul Trombone (1961)

South American Cookin' is an album by jazz trombonist Curtis Fuller, released in 1961 on the Epic label. It contains a version of One Note Samba, the Antônio Carlos Jobim that was made famous in North America when Stan Getz recorded it the following year.

== Reception ==
Professional ratings
Review scores
Source	Rating
Allmusic	3/5 stars

The Allmusic website awarded the album 3 stars.

== Track listing ==
1. "Hello, Young Lovers" (Oscar Hammerstein II, Richard Rodgers) - 5:20
2. "Bésame Mucho" (Sunny Skylar, Consuelo Velázquez) - 9:13
3. "Willow Weep for Me" (Ann Ronell) - 6:43
4. "One Note Samba" (Antonio Carlos Jobim, Newton Mendonça) - 4:11
5. "Wee Dot" (J. J. Johnson, Leo Parker) - 6:48
6. "Autumn Leaves" (Joseph Kosma, Johnny Mercer, Jacques Prévert) - 7:09

== Personnel ==
- Curtis Fuller - trombone
- Zoot Sims - tenor saxophone
- Tommy Flanagan - piano
- Jymie Merritt - bass
- Dave Bailey - drums
