= Bone & Bari =

Studio album by Curtis Fuller
- Released: Early January 1958
- Recorded: August 4, 1957
- Studios: Van Gelder Studio; Hackensack, New Jersey
- Genre: Jazz
- Length: 36:16
- Labels: Blue Note; BLP 1572
- Producer: Alfred Lion

Curtis Fuller chronology
The Opener (1957)	Bone & Bari (1958)	Jazz ...It's Magic! (1957)

Bone & Bari is an album by American jazz trombonist Curtis Fuller, recorded on August 4, 1957 and released on Blue Note early the following year. The quintet features saxophonist Tate Houston and rhythm section Sonny Clark, Paul Chambers and Art Taylor.

== Reception ==
Professional ratings
Review scores
Source	Rating
AllMusic	3/5 stars

The AllMusic review by Lee Bloom stated: "The session is unique in its pairing of trombone with the baritone sax of Tate Houston. The resultant front line sound is thick and rotund."

== Track listing ==
All tracks are written by Curtis Fuller except as noted.

Side 1
No.	Title	Length
1.	"Algonquin"	5:04
2.	"Nita's Waltz"	6:57
3.	"Bone and Bari"	6:20

Side 2
No.	Title	Writer(s)	Length
1.	"Heart and Soul"	Hoagy Carmichael; Frank Loesser	4:50
2.	"Again"	Dorcas Cochran; Lionel Newman	7:19
3.	"Pickup"		5:46

== Personnel ==
=== Musicians ===
- Curtis Fuller – trombone (except track 5)
- Tate Houston – baritone saxophone (except track 4)
- Sonny Clark – piano
- Paul Chambers – bass
- Art Taylor – drums

=== Technical personnel ===
- Alfred Lion – producer
- Rudy Van Gelder – recording engineer, mastering engineer
- Tom Hannan – design
- Francis Wolff – photography
- Leonard Feather – liner notes
