= Curtis Fuller =

American jazz trombonist (1932–2021)

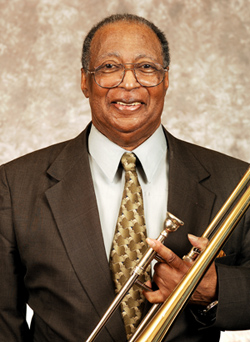
- Fuller in 2008

Background information
- Born: Curtis DuBois Fuller; December 15, 1932; Detroit, Michigan, U.S.
- Died: May 8, 2021 (aged 88) Detroit, Michigan, U.S.
- Genres: Jazz; hard bop; soul jazz
- Occupations: Musician; composer; educator
- Instrument: Trombone
- Years active: 1953–2021
- Labels: Blue Note; Prestige; Savoy; Impulse!; Epic; Atlantic
- Formerly of: The Jazztet; The Jazz Messengers

Curtis DuBois Fuller (December 15, 1932 – May 8, 2021) was an American jazz trombonist. He was a member of Art Blakey's Jazz Messengers and contributed to many classic jazz recordings.

== Early life ==
Curtis Fuller was born in Detroit, Michigan, on December 15, 1932. Throughout his life, his birthdate was reported differently because he had added two years to his age at 17, in part to gain work. His father had immigrated from Jamaica and worked in a Ford factory but died from tuberculosis before his son was born. His mother, who had moved north from Atlanta, died when Curtis was nine. He spent several years in an orphanage run by Jesuits. Fuller developed a passion for jazz after one of the nuns took him to see Illinois Jacquet and his band, with J. J. Johnson on trombone.

Fuller attended a public school in his hometown, along with Paul Chambers, Donald Byrd, Tommy Flanagan, Thad Jones, and Milt Jackson. After attempting the violin, and with the saxophone (his next choice) being unavailable, he took up the trombone when he was 16. He studied under Johnson and Elmer James.

== Career ==
Fuller joined the U.S. Army in 1953 to fight in the Korean War. He served until 1955 and played in an army band with Chambers and brothers Cannonball and Nat Adderley. Upon his return from military service, Fuller joined the quintet of Yusef Lateef, another Detroit musician. The quintet moved to New York in 1957, and Fuller recorded his first sessions as a leader with Prestige Records.

Alfred Lion of Blue Note Records first heard Fuller playing with Miles Davis in the late 1950s. Fuller led four dates for Blue Note, though one of these, an album with Slide Hampton, was not issued for many years. Lion featured Fuller as a sideman on record dates led by Sonny Clark (Dial "S" for Sonny, Sonny's Crib) and John Coltrane (Blue Train). Other sideman appearances over the next decade included album work under the leadership of Bud Powell, Jimmy Smith, Wayne Shorter, Lee Morgan, and Joe Henderson (a former roommate at Wayne State University in 1956).

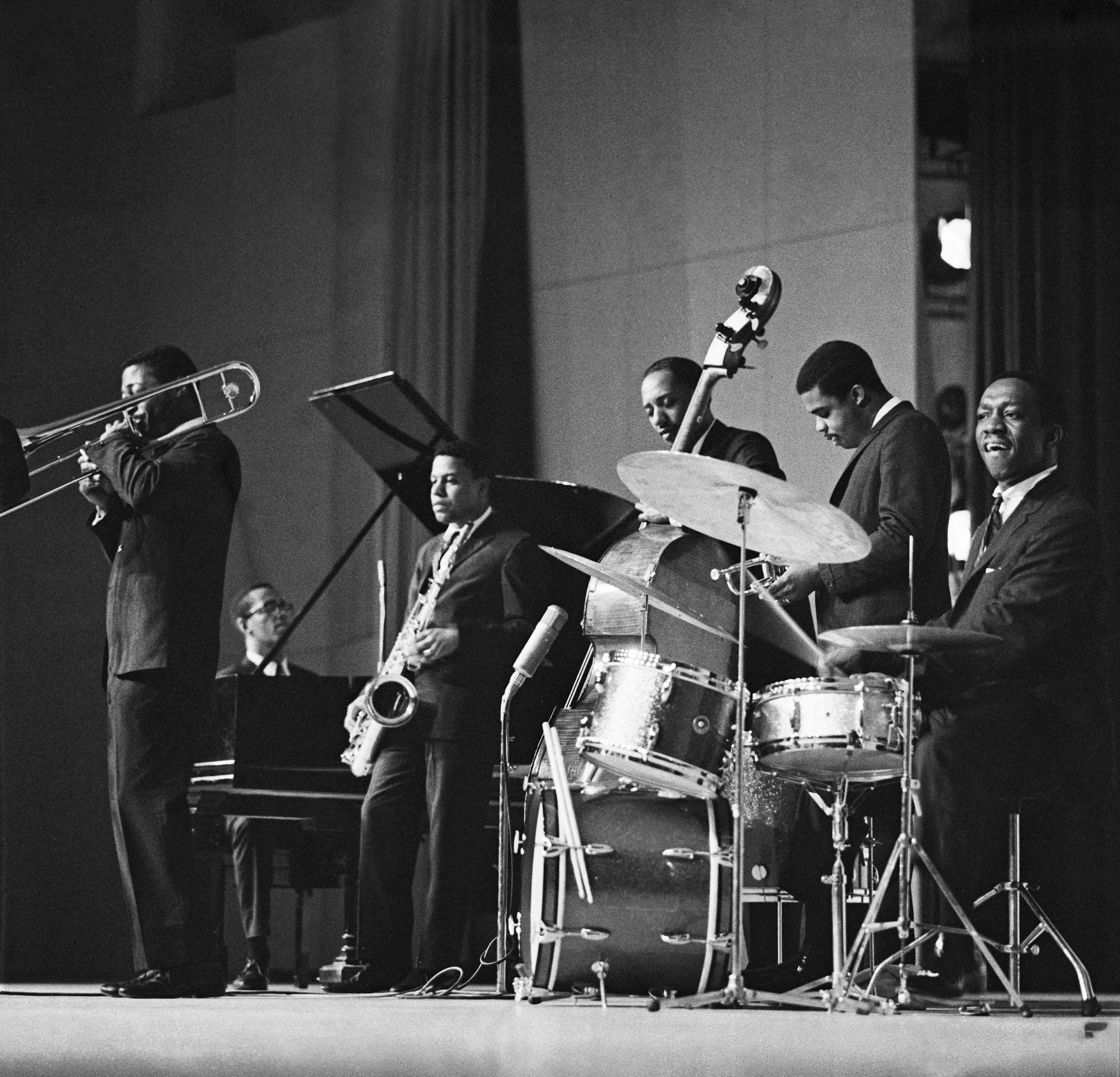
Fuller with the Jazz Messengers at the Kulttuuritalo, Helsinki, 1962. From left: Fuller, Cedar Walton, Wayne Shorter, Jymie Merritt, Freddie Hubbard, and Art Blakey.

Fuller was the first trombonist to be part of the Art Farmer – Benny Golson Jazztet. In 1961, he became the sixth member of Art Blakey's Jazz Messengers and stayed with Blakey until 1965. In the early 1960s, Fuller recorded two albums as a leader for Impulse! Records, having also recorded for Savoy Records, United Artists, and Epic after his obligations to Blue Note had ended. In the late 1960s, he was part of Dizzy Gillespie's band that also featured Foster Elliott. Fuller went on tour with Count Basie and also reunited with Blakey and Golson.

== Later life ==
Fuller married Catherine Rose Driscoll in 1980. She died of lung cancer in 2010; Fuller recorded his album The Story of Cathy & Me (2011) as a tribute.

Fuller was granted an honorary doctorate of music from the Berklee College of Music in 1999. Eight years later, he was honored as an NEA Jazz Master. He continued to perform and record, and was a faculty member of the New York State Summer School of the Arts (NYSSSA) School of Jazz Studies (SJS).

Fuller died May 8, 2021, at the age of 88. He had eight children, nine grandchildren, and 13 great-grandchildren.

== Discography ==
=== As leader ===
Year recorded	Title	Label	Year released	Personnel/Notes
1957	New Trombone	Prestige	1957	Quintet, with Fuller (trombone), Sonny Red (alto sax), Hank Jones (piano), Doug Watkins (bass), Louis Hayes (drums)
1957	Curtis Fuller with Red Garland – with Red Garland	Prestige New Jazz	1963	Quintet, with Fuller (trombone), Sonny Red (alto sax), Red Garland (piano), Paul Chambers (bass), Louis Hayes (drums)
1957	Curtis Fuller and Hampton Hawes with French Horns – with Hampton Hawes	Status	1965	Septet, with Fuller (trombone), David Amram, Julius Watkins (French horn), Sahib Shihab (alto sax), Hampton Hawes (piano), Addison Farmer (bass), Jerry Segal (drums); previously included on Baritones and French Horns (Prestige, 1958)
1957	The Opener	Blue Note	1957	Quintet, with Fuller (trombone), Hank Mobley (tenor sax), Bobby Timmons (piano), Paul Chambers (bass), Art Taylor (drums)
1957	Bone & Bari	Blue Note	1957	Quintet, with Fuller (trombone), Tate Houston (baritone sax), Sonny Clark (piano), Paul Chambers (bass), Art Taylor (drums)
1957	Jazz … It's Magic!	Regent	1958	Quintet, with Fuller (trombone), Sonny Red (alto sax), Tommy Flanagan (piano), George Tucker (bass), Louis Hayes (drums)
1957	Curtis Fuller, Volume 3	Blue Note	1960	Quintet, with Fuller (trombone), Art Farmer (trumpet), Sonny Clark (piano), George Tucker (bass), Louis Hayes (drums)
1958	Two Bones	Blue Note	1980	Quintet, with Fuller and Slide Hampton (trombone), Sonny Clark (piano), George Tucker (bass), Charlie Persip (drums)
1959	Sliding Easy	United Artists	1959	Sextet, with Fuller (trombone), Lee Morgan (trumpet), Hank Mobley (tenor sax), Tommy Flanagan (piano), Paul Chambers (bass), Elvin Jones (drums)
1959	Blues-ette	Savoy	1959	Quintet, with Fuller (trombone), Benny Golson (tenor sax), Tommy Flanagan (piano), Jimmy Garrison (bass), Al Harewood (drums)
1959	The Curtis Fuller Jazztet with Benny Golson – with Benny Golson	Savoy	1959	Sextet, with Fuller (trombone), Lee Morgan (trumpet), Benny Golson (tenor sax), Wynton Kelly (piano), Paul Chambers (bass), Charlie Persip (drums)
1959	Imagination	Savoy	1960	Sextet, with Fuller (trombone), Thad Jones (trumpet), Benny Golson (tenor sax), McCoy Tyner (piano), Jimmy Garrison (bass), Dave Bailey (drums)
1960	Images of Curtis Fuller	Savoy	1975	Sextet, with Fuller (trombone), Wilbur Harden (trumpet), Yusef Lateef (flute, tenor sax), McCoy Tyner (piano), Jimmy Garrison (bass), Clifford Jarvis (drums)
1960	Boss of the Soul-Stream Trombone	Warwick	1961	Sextet, with Fuller (trombone), Freddie Hubbard (trumpet), Yusef Lateef (flute, tenor sax), Walter Bishop Jr. (piano), Buddy Catlett (bass), Stu Martin (drums)
1961	The Magnificent Trombone of Curtis Fuller	Epic	1961	Quintet, with Fuller (trombone), Les Spann (flute, guitar), Walter Bishop Jr. (piano), Buddy Catlett or Jimmy Garrison (bass), Stu Martin (drums)
1961	Jazz Conference Abroad	Smash	1961	With Fuller, David Baker, Melba Liston, Åke Persson (trombone), Benny Bailey, Paul Cohen, Rolf Ericson, Freddie Hubbard (trumpet), Julius Watkins (French horn), Joe Lopes, Phil Woods (alto sax), Budd Johnson (tenor sax), Eric Dixon (tenor sax, flute), Sahib Shihab (baritone sax, flute), Patti Bown (piano), Les Spann (flute, guitar), Buddy Catlett (bass), Stu Martin (drums)
1961	South American Cookin'	Epic	1961	Quintet, with Fuller (trombone), Zoot Sims (tenor sax), Tommy Flanagan (piano), Jymie Merritt (bass), Dave Bailey (drums)
1961	Soul Trombone	Impulse!	1962	Sextet, with Fuller (trombone), Freddie Hubbard (trumpet), Jimmy Heath (tenor sax), Cedar Walton (piano), Jymie Merritt (bass), Jimmy Cobb/G. T. Hogan (drums)
1962	Cabin in the Sky	Impulse!	1962	With Fuller, Wayne Andre, Bob Brookmeyer, Alan Raph, Kai Winding (trombone), Bernie Glow, Freddie Hubbard, Al De Risi, Ernie Royal (trumpet), Ray Alonge, James Buffington, Tony Miranda, Morris Secon (French horn), Harvey Phillips (tuba), Hank Jones (piano), Eddie Costa (piano, percussion), Art Davis (bass), Osie Johnson (drums); with Fuller (trombone), Jones (piano), Barry Galbraith (guitar), Milt Hinton (bass), Johnson (drums), Costa (percussion), Margaret Ross (harp), unnamed string section
1971	Crankin'	Mainstream	1973	With Fuller (trombone), Ramon Morris (tenor sax), Bill Hardman (trumpet), Jimmy Heath (soprano, tenor sax), George Cables (electric piano), Bill Washer (guitar), Stanley Clarke (bass, electric bass), Lenny White (drums, electric percussion)
1972	Smokin'	Mainstream	1972	Septet, with Fuller (trombone), Bill Hardman (trumpet), Jimmy Heath (soprano, tenor sax), Cedar Walton (piano, electric piano), Ted Dunbar (guitar), Mickey Bass (bass), Billy Higgins (drums)
1978	Four on the Outside	Timeless	1978	Quintet, with Fuller (trombone), Pepper Adams (baritone sax), James Williams (piano), Dennis Irwin (bass), John Yarling (drums)
1978	Fire and Filigree	Bee Hive	1979	Quintet, with Fuller (trombone), Sal Nistico (tenor sax), Walter Bishop Jr. (piano), Sam Jones (bass), Freddie Waits (drums)
1982	Curtis Fuller Meets Roma Jazz Trio	Timeless	1987	Quartet, with Fuller (trombone), Danilo Rea (piano), Enzo Pietropaoli (bass), Roberto Gatto (drums)
1993	Blues-ette Part II	Savoy	1993	Quintet, with Fuller (trombone), Benny Golson (tenor sax), Tommy Flanagan (piano), Ray Drummond (bass), Al Harewood (drums)
2002	Curtis Fuller in New Orleans	Progressive	2018	Sextet, with Fuller (trombone), Maurice Brown (trumpet), Javon Jackson (tenor sax), Peter Martin (piano), Bill Huntington (bass), Jason Marsalis (drums)
2003	Up Jumped Spring – with Brad Goode	Delmark	2004	Quintet, with Fuller (trombone), Brad Goode (trumpet), Karl Montzka (piano), Larry Gray/Stewart Miller (bass), Tim Davis (drums), Jacey Falk (vocal, one track)
2003	Keep It Simple	Savant	2005	Quintet, with Fuller (trombone), Javon Jackson (tenor sax), Doug Carn (piano), Rodney Jordan (bass), Fritz Wise (drums)
2009	I Will Tell Her	Capri	2010	Sextet, with Fuller (trombone), Keith Oxman (tenor sax), Al Hood (trumpet), Chip Stephens (piano), Ken Walker (bass), Todd Reid (drums); live
2011	The Story of Cathy & Me	Challenge	2011	With Fuller (trombone), Daniel Bauerkemper/Akeem Marable (tenor sax), Lester Walker (trumpet), Nick Rosen/Kenny Banks Jr. (piano), Brandy Brewer/Kevin Smith (bass), Henry Conerway III (drums), Clarence Levy (percussion, three tracks), Tia Michelle Rouse (vocal, two tracks)
2011	Down Home	Capri	2012	With Fuller (trombone), Keith Oxman (tenor sax), Al Hood (trumpet, flugelhorn), Chip Stephens (piano), Ken Walker (bass), Todd Reid (drums)

=== As sideman ===
With Count Basie

- Basie Big Band (Pablo, 1975)
- I Told You So (Pablo, 1976)
- Prime Time (Pablo, 1977)
- Fun Time (Pablo, 1991) – rec. 1975

With Dave Bailey

- One Foot in the Gutter (Epic, 1960)
- Gettin' Into Somethin' (Epic, 1960)
- Bash! (Jazzline, 1961)/Modern Mainstream (Fontana, 1963)

With Art Blakey

- Art Blakey!!!!! Jazz Messengers!!!!! (Impulse!, 1961)
- Mosaic (Blue Note, 1961)
- Three Blind Mice (United Artists, 1962)
- Caravan (Riverside, 1962)
- Ugetsu (Riverside, 1963)
- The African Beat (Blue Note, 1962)
- Buhaina's Delight (Blue Note, 1963)
- Golden Boy (Colpix, 1963)
- Free For All (Blue Note, 1965)
- 'S Make It (Limelight, 1965)
- Indestructible (Blue Note, 1966)
- Kyoto (Riverside, 1966)
- Thermo (Milestone, 1973)
- In My Prime Vol. 1 (Timeless, 1978)
- Live at the Renaissance Club (Blue Note, 1978)
- Live Messengers (Blue Note, 1978)

With Sonny Clark

- Dial "S" for Sonny (Blue Note, 1957)
- Sonny's Crib (Blue Note, 1958)

With John Coltrane

- Blue Train (Blue Note, 1958)
- Tanganyika Strut (Savoy, 1958) Coltrane co-led with Wilbur Harden
- Jazz Way Out (Savoy, 1958) as for Tanganyika Strut
- Dial Africa: The Savoy Sessions (Savoy, 1977) reissue of the 1958 Savoy sessions
- Gold Coast (Savoy, 1978) – rec. 1958

With Kenny Dorham

- This Is the Moment! (Riverside, 1958)
- Hot Stuff from Brazil (West Wind, 1988)

With Art Farmer

- Brass Shout (United Artists, 1959)
- Meet the Jazztet (Argo, 1960)
- Jazztet, Back to the City (Contemporary, 1986)
- Jazztet, Real Time (Contemporary, 1988)

With Joe Farnsworth

- It's Prime Time (Eighty-Eight's, 2003)
- Drumspeak (Commodore, 2006)

With Benny Golson

- Groovin' with Golson (New Jazz, 1959)
- The Other Side of Benny Golson (Riverside, 1959)
- Gone with Golson (New Jazz, 1960)
- Gettin' with It (New Jazz, 1960)
- Take a Number from 1 to 10 (Argo, 1961)
- Pop + Jazz = Swing (Audio Fidelity, 1962)/Just Jazz! (Audio Fidelity, 1965)
- California Message (Baystate, 1981)
- One More Mem'ry (Baystate, 1982)

With Lionel Hampton

- Hamp in Haarlem (Timeless, 1979)
- Live in Europe (Elite Special, 1980)
- Outrageous (Glad-Hamp, 1982)

With Jimmy Heath

- The Thumper (Riverside, 1960)
- Love and Understanding (Muse, 1973)
- Fast Company (Milestone, 1975)
- The Time and the Place (Landmark, 1994)

With Joe Henderson

- Mode for Joe (Blue Note, 1966)
- In Pursuit of Blackness (Milestone, 1971)

With Freddie Hubbard

- The Artistry of Freddie Hubbard (Impulse!, 1963)
- The Body & the Soul (Impulse!, 1963)

With Philly Joe Jones

- Drums Around the World (Riverside, 1959)
- Together! (Atlantic, 1964)

With Quincy Jones

- Newport '61 (Mercury, 1961)
- The Quintessence (Impulse!, 1962)

With Yusef Lateef

- Jazz for the Thinker (Savoy, 1957)
- Stable Mates (Savoy, 1957)
- Jazz Mood (Savoy, 1957)
- Before Dawn: The Music of Yusef Lateef (Verve, 1957)
- The Centaur and the Phoenix (Riverside, 1960)

With Mike Longo

- The Awakening (Mainstream, 1972)
- New York '78 (Consolidated Artists, 1996)

With Machito

- With Flute to Boot (Roulette, 1959)
- Latin Soul Plus Jazz (Caliente, 1973)

With Blue Mitchell

- Big 6 (Riverside, 1958)
- Blue Soul (Riverside, 1959)

With Jackie McLean

- Makin' the Changes (New Jazz, 1960)
- A Long Drink of the Blues (New Jazz, 1961)

With Hank Mobley

- Monday Night at Birdland (Roulette, 1959)
- Another Monday Night at Birdland (Roulette, 1959)
- A Caddy for Daddy (Blue Note, 1966)

With Lee Morgan

- City Lights (Blue Note, 1957)
- Tom Cat (Blue Note, 1980)

With David "Fathead" Newman

- Song for the New Man (HighNote, 2004)
- Diamondhead (HighNote, 2008)

With Woody Shaw

- Woody III (Columbia, 1979)
- For Sure! (Columbia, 1980)
- Rosewood (Columbia, 1977 [1978])

With Jimmy Smith

- House Party (Blue Note, 1957 [1958])
- Confirmation (Blue Note, 1979)
- Special Guests (Blue Note, 1984)

With Stanley Turrentine

- The Sugar Man (CTI, 1975)
- In Memory Of (Blue Note, 1979)

With Cedar Walton

- Eastern Rebellion 3 (Timeless, 1980)
- Cedar's Blues (Red, 1985)

With others

- Ahmed Abdul-Malik, East Meets West (RCA Victor, 1960)
- Walter Bishop Jr., Cubicle (Muse, 1978)
- Bob Brookmeyer, Jazz Is a Kick (Mercury, 1960)
- Paul Chambers, 1st Bassman (Vee Jay, 1960)
- Willis Conover, Jazz Committee for Latin American Affairs (FM, 1963)
- Buddy DeFranco, Blues Bag (Vee Jay, 1965)
- Lou Donaldson, Lou Takes Off (Blue Note, 1958)
- Gil Evans, Great Jazz Standards (World Pacific, 1959)
- Tommy Flanagan, Trio and Sextet (Onyx, 1973)
- Dizzy Gillespie, The Dizzy Gillespie Reunion Big Band (MPS, 1969)
- Dexter Gordon, Great Encounters (Columbia, 1979)
- Johnny Griffin, The Cat (Antilles, 1991)
- Slide Hampton, World of Trombones (West 54, 1979)
- Wilbur Harden, Jazz Way Out (Savoy, 1958)
- Hampton Hawes, Baritones and French Horns (Prestige, 1957)
- Albert Heath, Kwanza (The First) (Muse, 1974)
- John Jenkins, Jazz Eyes (Regent, 1957)
- Cliff Jordan, Cliff Jordan (Blue Note, 1957)
- Abbey Lincoln, It's Magic (Riverside, 1958)
- Booker Little, New York Sessions (Lone Hill, 2004)
- Gary McFarland, Today (Skye, 1970)
- Judy Niemack, Blue Bop (Free Lance, 1989)
- Cecil Payne, Bright Moments (Spotlite, 1980)
- Houston Person, Blue Odyssey (Prestige, 1968)
- Bud Powell, Bud! The Amazing Bud Powell (Vol. 3) (Blue Note, 1957)
- Paul Quinichette, On the Sunny Side (Prestige, 1957)
- Wayne Shorter, Schizophrenia (Blue Note, 1969)
- Pat Thomas, Jazz Patterns (Strand, 1961)
- Mickey Tucker, Theme for a Woogie-Boogie (Denon, 1979)
- Bobby Watson, All Because of You (Roulette, 1978)
- Frank Wess, Opus de Blues (Savoy, 1984)
- Ernie Wilkins, K.A.L.E.I.D.O.D.U.K.E (Birdology, 1994)
- Kai Winding and Curtis Fuller, Giant Bones '80 (Sonet, 1980)
- Phil Woods, Rights of Swing (Candid, 1961)

== See also ==
- Blue Note Records
