= Sonny's Crib =

Studio album by Sonny Clark
- Released: March 1958
- Recorded: September 1, 1957
- Studio: Van Gelder Studio; Hackensack, NJ
- Genre: Hard bop
- Length: 44:18
- Label: Blue Note; BLP 1576
- Producer: Alfred Lion

Sonny Clark chronology
Dial "S" for Sonny (1957)	Sonny's Crib (1958)	Sonny Clark Trio (1958)

Professional ratings
Review scores
Source	Rating
AllMusic	3.5/5 stars
The Penguin Guide to Jazz Recordings	3/4 stars

Sonny's Crib is a studio album by the jazz pianist Sonny Clark. It was released through Blue Note Records in March 1958. The sextet assembled for the recording session consists of horn players Donald Byrd, Curtis Fuller, and John Coltrane and rhythm section Paul Chambers and Art Taylor. The first half of the album comprises three jazz standards, while the second half contains two original compositions by Clark. The recording was made on September 1, 1957.

== Critical reception ==
The AllMusic review by Thom Jurek states, "Sonny's Crib is a phenomenal recording, one that opened the door to hard bop becoming the norm in the late '50s, and one that drew deft, imaginative performances from all its players".

Critic Reid Thompson compared the album favorably to Coltrane's Blue Train (recorded two weeks later), seeing them as the epitome of the Blue Note sound in the late 1950s.

== Track listing ==
Side 1
No.	Title	Writer(s)	Length
1.	"With a Song in My Heart"	Richard Rodgers; Lorenz Hart	7:54
2.	"Speak Low"	Kurt Weill; Ogden Nash	6:50
3.	"Come Rain or Come Shine"	Harold Arlen; Johnny Mercer	7:29

Side 2
No.	Title	Writer(s)	Length
1.	"Sonny's Crib"	Sonny Clark	13:31
2.	"News for Lulu"	Clark	8:34

CD bonus tracks
No.	Title	Writer(s)	Length
6.	"With a Song in My Heart" (alternate take)	Rodgers	8:47
7.	"Speak Low" (alternate take)	Weill; Nash	6:57
8.	"Sonny's Crib" (alternate take)	Clark	9:56

== Personnel ==
=== Musicians ===
- Sonny Clark – piano
- Donald Byrd – trumpet
- Curtis Fuller – trombone
- John Coltrane – tenor saxophone
- Paul Chambers – bass
- Art Taylor – drums

=== Technical personnel ===
- Alfred Lion – producer
- Rudy Van Gelder – recording engineer, mastering
- Reid Miles – design
- Francis Wolff – photography
- Leonard Feather – liner notes
