= Dial "S" for Sonny =

Studio album by Sonny Clark
- Released: November 1957
- Recorded: July 21, 1957
- Studios: Van Gelder Studio; Hackensack, NJ
- Genre: Bop
- Length: 40:55
- Labels: Blue Note; BLP 1570
- Producer: Alfred Lion

Sonny Clark chronology
| Dial "S" for Sonny (1957) | Sonny's Crib (1958) |

Professional ratings
Review scores
| Source | Rating |
|---|---|
| AllMusic | 3/5 stars |
| The Penguin Guide to Jazz Recordings | 3.5/4 stars |

Dial "S" for Sonny is the debut studio album by the American jazz pianist Sonny Clark. It was released in November 1957 through Blue Note Records. The recording was made on July 21, 1957 with a septet assembled for the session consisting of horn section Art Farmer, Curtis Fuller, and Hank Mobley and rhythm section Wilbur Ware and Louis Hayes.

== Background ==
=== Title ===
The album title is an allusion to Frederick Knott's play Dial M for Murder, which was first produced in 1952 and then made into a successful film by Alfred Hitchcock in 1954.

== Reception ==
Critic John S. Wilson, in a contemporaneous review, remarked "Art Farmer contributes some crackling solos to Dial S for Sonny, ... but he has to fight a chomp-chomp rhythm section."

The AllMusic review by Stephen Thomas Erlewine states, "Dial 'S' for Sonny, Sonny Clark's first session for Blue Note Records and his first session as a leader, is a terrific set of laidback bop, highlighted by Clark's liquid, swinging solos... Clark steals the show in this set of fine, straight-ahead bop."

== Track listing ==
All compositions by Sonny Clark, except as indicated

1. "Dial "S" for Sonny" – 7:26
2. "Bootin' It" – 5:17
3. "It Could Happen to You" (Johnny Burke, Jimmy Van Heusen) – 6:59
4. "Sonny's Mood" – 8:38
5. "Shoutin' on a Riff" – 6:45
6. "Love Walked In" (George Gershwin, Ira Gershwin) – 5:50
7. "Bootin' It" [Alternate Take] – 5:15 (CD bonus track)

== Personnel ==
=== Musicians ===
- Sonny Clark – piano
- Art Farmer – trumpet (except "Love Walked In")
- Curtis Fuller – trombone (except "Love Walked In")
- Hank Mobley – tenor saxophone (except "Love Walked In")
- Wilbur Ware – bass
- Louis Hayes – drums

=== Technical personnel ===
- Alfred Lion – producer
- Rudy Van Gelder – recording engineer
- Reid Miles – design
- Francis Wolff – photography
- Robert Levin – liner notes

== Charts ==
Chart performance for Dial "S" for Sonny
| Chart (2022) | Peak position |
|---|---|
| Belgian Albums (Ultratop Flanders) | 147 |
