= The Opener =

Studio album by Curtis Fuller
- Released: End of September 1957
- Recorded: June 16, 1957
- Studio: Van Gelder Studio; Hackensack, New Jersey
- Genre: Jazz
- Length: 36:56
- Label: Blue Note; BLP 1567
- Producer: Alfred Lion

Curtis Fuller chronology
Curtis Fuller and Hampton Hawes with French Horns (1957)	The Opener (1957)	Bone & Bari (1957)

The Opener is an album by American jazz trombonist Curtis Fuller, recorded on June 16, 1957 and released on Blue Note later that year—his debut for the label.

== Reception ==
Professional ratings
Review scores
Source	Rating
AllMusic	4.5/5 stars

The AllMusic review by Stephen Thomas Erlewine states, "The Opener is trombonist Curtis Fuller's first album for Blue Note and it is a thoroughly impressive affair."

== Track listing ==
All compositions by Curtis Fuller except as indicated

=== Side 1 ===
1. "A Lovely Way to Spend an Evening" (Harold Adamson, Jimmy McHugh) – 6:52
2. "Hugore" – 6:43
3. "Oscalypso" (Oscar Pettiford) – 5:40

=== Side 2 ===
1. "Here's to My Lady" (Rube Bloom, Johnny Mercer) – 6:43
2. "Lizzy's Bounce" – 5:25
3. "Soon" (George Gershwin, Ira Gershwin) – 5:33

== Personnel ==
=== Musicians ===
- Curtis Fuller – trombone
- Hank Mobley – tenor saxophone (except "A Lovely Way to Spend an Evening", "Here's to My Lady")
- Bobby Timmons – piano
- Paul Chambers – bass
- Art Taylor – drums

=== Technical personnel ===
- Alfred Lion – producer
- Rudy Van Gelder – recording engineer
- Reid Miles – design
- Francis Wolff – photography
- Robert Levin – liner notes
