= Images of Curtis Fuller =

Studio album by Curtis Fuller
- Released: 1960
- Recorded: June 6–7, 1960
- Studio: Van Gelder Studio, Englewood Cliffs, NJ
- Genre: Jazz
- Length: 30:37
- Label: Savoy; MG 12164

Curtis Fuller chronology
Imagination (1959)	Images of Curtis Fuller (1960)	Boss of the Soul-Stream Trombone (1960)

Images of Curtis Fuller is an album by jazz trombonist Curtis Fuller, released in 1960 on the Savoy label.

== Reception ==
Professional ratings
Review scores
Source	Rating
AllMusic	4/5 stars

AllMusic awarded the album 4 stars.

== Track listing ==
All compositions by Curtis Fuller

1. "Accident" - 4:12
2. "Darryl's Minor" - 5:30
3. "Be Back Ta-Reckla" - 7:00
4. "Judyful" - 8:55
5. "New Date" - 5:00
6. "Accident" [take 3] - 4:23 Bonus track on CD reissue
7. "Darryl's Minor" [take 2] - 6:12 Bonus track
8. "New Date" [take 1] - 6:25 Bonus track on CD reissue
- Recorded at Van Gelder Studio, Engelwood Cliffs on June 6 (tracks 5 & 8) and June 7 (tracks 1–4, 6 & 7), 1960

== Personnel ==
- Curtis Fuller - trombone
- McCoy Tyner - piano
- Wilbur Harden - trumpet
- Yusef Lateef - tenor saxophone, flute
- Lee Morgan - trumpet (tracks 1–4 & 6–7)
- Jimmy Garrison (tracks 5 & 8), Milt Hinton (tracks 1–4 & 6–7) - bass
- Bobby Donaldson (tracks 1–4 & 6–7), Clifford Jarvis (tracks 5 & 8) - drums
