= Reaching Out (Dave Bailey album) =

Studio album by Dave Bailey
- Released: 1961
- Recorded: March 15, 1961
- Studio: Bell Sound (New York City)
- Genre: Jazz
- Length: 66:40 CD reissue with bonus tracks
- Label: Jazztime JT 003; Muse MR 5014; Black Lion BLCD 760129
- Producer: Fred Norsworthy

Dave Bailey chronology
Gettin' Into Somethin' (1961)	Reaching Out (1961)	Bash! (1962)

Green Blues Cover

Reaching Out is an album by jazz drummer Dave Bailey which was originally released on the Jazztime label in 1961. The album was reissued under guitarist Grant Green as Green Blues in 1973 on the Muse label and reissued on CD under the original title on the Black Lion label with 3 alternate takes in 1989.

== Reception ==
Professional ratings
Review scores
Source	Rating
AllMusic	3.5/5 stars
DownBeat	3.5/5 stars

The DownBeat reviewer praised all of the musicians with the exception of Gardner, partly blaming an out of tune piano, and highlighted Green, "who does most to raise this simple blowing session out of the common". AllMusic reviewer Michael G. Nastos stated: "The cool, spacious, thoughtful and unhurried sound of Haynes dominates this recording, as Green barely comes up for air on solos or the occasional joint melody line. Billy Gardner, better known as an organist, plays beautifully and with feeling on the piano, while bassist Ben Tucker and the great drummer Dave Bailey team up to provide the perfect, steady rhythmic foundation so essential to great mainstream jazz expressionism".

== Track listing ==
1. "Reaching Out" (Rudy Schaffer) - 5:23
2. "Our Miss Brooks" (Harold Vick) - 6:49
3. "A Flick of a Trick" (Ben Tucker) - 7:51
4. "One for Elena" (Billy Gardner) - 6:09
5. "Baby You Should Know It" (Tucker) - 9:14
6. "Falling in Love with Love" (Lorenz Hart, Richard Rodgers) - 5:26

Bonus tracks on CD reissue:

7. "Reaching Out" [alternate take] (Schaffer) - 6:50
8. "Our Miss Brooks" [Take 1] (Vick) - 10:14
9. "One for Elena" [Take 4] (Gardner) - 7:52

== Personnel ==
- Dave Bailey - drums
- Frank Haynes - tenor saxophone
- Billy Gardner - piano
- Grant Green - guitar
- Ben Tucker - bass
