= Red Garland's Piano =

Studio album by Red Garland
- Released: Early June 1957
- Recorded: March 22, 1957 (#1–4, 7–8); December 14, 1956 (#5–6)
- Studio: Van Gelder Studio, Hackensack, New Jersey
- Genre: Jazz
- Length: 44:35
- Label: Prestige; PRLP 7086
- Producer: Bob Weinstock

Red Garland chronology
A Garland of Red (1956)	Red Garland's Piano (1957)	Curtis Fuller with Red Garland (1957)

Professional ratings
Review scores
Source	Rating
AllMusic	4/5 stars
The Penguin Guide to Jazz Recordings	3/4 stars

Red Garland's Piano is an album by jazz pianist Red Garland, released in 1957 on Prestige Records. It features tracks recorded mainly on March 22, 1957.

== Track listing ==
1. "Please Send Me Someone to Love" (Percy Mayfield) - 9:51
2. "Stompin' at the Savoy" (Benny Goodman, Andy Razaf, Edgar Sampson, Chick Webb) - 3:12
3. "The Very Thought of You" (Ray Noble) - 4:12
4. "Almost Like Being in Love" (Alan Jay Lerner, Frederick Loewe) - 4:52
5. "If I Were a Bell" (Frank Loesser) - 6:41
6. "I Know Why (And So Do You)" (Harry Warren, Mack Gordon) - 4:50
7. "I Can't Give You Anything But Love" (Dorothy Fields, Jimmy McHugh) - 5:05
8. "But Not for Me" (George Gershwin, Ira Gershwin) - 5:52

== Personnel ==
- Red Garland - piano
- Paul Chambers - bass
- Art Taylor - drums
