= Blues-ette Part II =

Studio album by Curtis Fuller
- Released: 1993
- Recorded: January 4 & 5, 1993
- Studio: Sound On Sound Studios, New York
- Genre: Jazz
- Length: 56:18
- Label: Savoy; COCY-75624
- Producer: Takao Ogawa

Curtis Fuller chronology
Curtis Fuller Meets Roma Jazz Trio (1982)	Blues-ette Part II (1993)	Up Jumped Spring (2004)

Blues-ette Part II is an album by trombonist Curtis Fuller recorded in 1993 and released by the Japanese Savoy label.

== Reception ==
Professional ratings
Review scores
Source	Rating
Allmusic	3.5/5 stars

Michael G. Nastos of Allmusic called it "A solid recording from top to bottom with no filler or cereal, and showcasing a good chunk of Golson's many great works, this comes easily recommended to all modern mainstream jazz lovers without hesitation".

== Track listing ==
1. "Love Your Spell Is Everywhere" (Edmund Goulding, Elsie Janis) – 7:09
2. "Sis" (Benny Golson) – 4:25
3. "Blues-ette '93" (Curtis Fuller) – 4:39
4. "Is It All a Game?" (Golson) – 5:46
5. "Capt' Kid" (Fuller) – 4:51
6. "Five Spot After Dark" (Golson) – 4:56
7. "How Am I to Know" (Jack King, Dorothy Parker) – 5:27
8. "Along Came Betty" (Golson) – 6:50
9. "Autumn in New York" (Vernon Duke) – 4:44
10. "Manhattan Serenade" (Louis Alter, Howard Johnson) – 6:28

== Personnel ==
- Curtis Fuller – trombone
- Benny Golson – tenor saxophone
- Tommy Flanagan - piano
- Ray Drummond – bass
- Al Harewood – drums
