= Les Spann =

American jazz guitarist and flautist

- Born: Leslie Spann Jr. May 23, 1932; Pine Bluff, Arkansas
- Died: January 24, 1989 (aged 56) New York City
- Genres: Jazz
- Occupation: Musician
- Instruments: Guitar, flute
- Years active: 1957–1967

Leslie Spann Jr. (May 23, 1932 – January 24, 1989) was an American jazz guitarist and flautist. As a sideman he recorded with Nat Adderley, Benny Bailey, Bill Coleman, Eddie "Lockjaw" Davis, Curtis Fuller, Red Garland, Benny Goodman, Sam Jones, Abbey Lincoln, Charles Mingus, Duke Pearson, Jerome Richardson, Charlie Shavers, Sonny Stitt, Billy Taylor, Randy Weston, and Ben Webster. As a leader he recorded only once, the album Gemini in 1961.

== Career ==
Les Spann was born in Pine Bluff, Arkansas, United States. From 1950 to 1957, he studied music at Tennessee State University. At the end of that time he worked with Phineas Newborn Jr. and in 1958 with Ronnell Bright. The following year, he joined a quintet in New York City led by Dizzy Gillespie, performing solos on flute and guitar and appearing on two of Gillespie's albums for Verve Records. After a year with Gillespie, he went to Europe as a member of Quincy Jones's big band. Two more albums followed, this time with Spann joining a sextet that included Duke Ellington, Johnny Hodges, and Harry "Sweets" Edison. He recorded with Hodges again in 1967. Around 1970, he played flute in a quartet led by the guitarist Kenny Burrell.

He died in New York City in 1989.

== Discography ==
=== As leader ===
- Gemini (Jazzland, 1961)

=== As sideman ===
With Nat Adderley
- That's Right! (Riverside, 1960)

With Benny Bailey

- Big Brass (Candid, 1960)

With Bill Coleman

- The Great Parisian Session (Polydor, 1960)
- From Boogie to Funk (Brunswick, 1960)

With Eddie "Lockjaw" Davis

- Lock, the Fox (RCA Victor, 1966)

With Wild Bill Davis

- The Music From Milk & Honey with Charlie Shavers (Everest, 1961)
- One More Time (Coral, 1962)

With Duke Ellington

- Side by Side (Verve, 1959) with Johnny Hodges
- Back to Back: Duke Ellington and Johnny Hodges Play the Blues (Verve, 1959)
- Paris Blues (United Artists, 1961)

With Mercer Ellington

- Colors In Rithym (Coral, 1959)

With Curtis Fuller

- The Magnificent Trombone of Curtis Fuller (Epic, 1961)

With Red Garland

- Solar (Jazzland, 1962)

With Dizzy Gillespie

- The Ebullient Mr. Gillespie (Verve, 1959)
- Have Trumpet, Will Excite! (Verve, 1959)

With Benny Goodman

- The King Of Swing: Best Of Yale Archives 1956-86 (Jazz Heritage Society, 2009)
- Yale University Archives, Vol. 3: Live At The Rainbow Grill & Basin Street 1966-1967 & 1954 (Nimbus, 2010)

With Wynonie Harris

- Women, Whiskey And Fish Tail - Recordings of 7 november, 1952 - 17 july, 1957 (Ace, 1993)

With Johnny Hodges

- A Smooth One (1960)
- Blue Hodge (Verve, 1961)
- Triple Play (RCA Victor, 1967)

With Eddie "Guitar Slim" Jones

- Atco Sessions (Atlantic, 1988 [1957])

With Quincy Jones

- The Birth of a Band! (Mercury, 1959)
- Swiss Radio Days Jazz Series, Vol. 1 1960
- I Dig Dancers (Mercury, 1960)
- At Basin Street East, Billy Eckstine/Quincy Jones (1961)
- Newport '61 (Mercury, 1961)
- The Great Wide World of Quincy Jones (Mercury, 1961)
- The Quincy Jones Big Band - Lausanne 1960 (TCB Records, 1994)
- The Quincy Jones Big Band - Free And Easy! Live In Sweden 1960 (Candid, 2013)

With Sam Jones

- The Chant (Riverside, 1961)
- Down Home (Riverside, 1962)

With Abbey Lincoln

- Abbey Is Blue (Riverside, 1959)

With Charles Mingus

- The Complete Town Hall Concert (Blue Note, 1962 [1994])

With Phineas Newborn Jr.

- Phineas Newborn, Jr. Plays Harold Arlen's Music from Jamaica, (RCA Victor, 1957)

With Duke Pearson

- Honeybuns (Atlantic, 1965)

With Jerome Richardson

- Going to the Movies (United Artists Jazz, 1962)

With Sonny Stitt

- The Matadors Meet the Bull (Roulette, 1965)
- What's New!!! (Roulette, 1966)
- I Keep Comin' Back! (Roulette, 1966)

With Billy Taylor

- Kwamina, (Mercury, 1961)

With Ben Webster

- Ben Webster and Associates (Verve, 1959)

With Randy Weston

- Uhuru Afrika (Roulette, 1960)

With Kai Winding

- Mondo Cane No. 2 (Verve, 1964)
