= Comin' Home Baby =

1961 song by Dave Bailey Quintet

Single by Mel Tormé

from the album Comin' Home Baby!
- B-side: "Right Now"
- Released: October 1962
- Recorded: September 13, 1962
- Genre: R&B, vocal jazz
- Length: 2:40
- Label: Atlantic
- Songwriters: Bob Dorough, Ben Tucker

Mel Tormé singles chronology
"Her Face" (1961)	"Comin' Home Baby" (1962)	"Cast Your Fate to the Wind" (1963)

"Comin' Home Baby" is a song originally written as an instrumental by Ben Tucker and first recorded by the Dave Bailey Quintet for their album 2 Feet in the Gutter in 1961, and shortly thereafter by Herbie Mann on his live album Herbie Mann at the Village Gate. Lyrics were added by Bob Dorough, and the vocal version became a US Top 40 hit on the Billboard Hot 100 for American jazz singer Mel Tormé from his album Comin' Home Baby! in 1962. The song has since been covered numerous times.

== Original instrumental recordings ==
The tune was first recorded by the Dave Bailey Quintet on 6 October 1961, and issued on 2 Feet in the Gutter. It was composed by Dave Bailey's bassist, Ben Tucker. The original musicians were Frank Haynes (tenor saxophone), Bill Hardman (trumpet), Billy Gardner (piano), Ben Tucker (bass), and Dave Bailey (drums).

The tune was then recorded six weeks later by Herbie Mann, live at the Village Gate, with Tucker again on bass. Mann's recording on his live album Herbie Mann at the Village Gate, produced by Nesuhi Ertegun and released by Atlantic Records in 1962, became popular and drew wider attention to the tune.

== Mel Tormé version ==
Tucker then persuaded his friend, lyricist Bob Dorough (later of Schoolhouse Rock! fame), to write a lyric for the tune, and producer Nesuhi Ertegun persuaded singer Mel Tormé, who had recently joined the Atlantic label, to record it. Tormé was initially reluctant to record the song, and later wrote that: "It was a minor-key blues tune with trite repetitious lyrics and an 'answer' pattern to be sung by the Cookies, a girl trio that had once worked for Ray Charles". The recording took place in New York City on 13 September 1962.

Despite Tormé's reservations, his version of the song, with an arrangement by Claus Ogerman, became his biggest hit since the early 1950s. It spent eleven weeks on the Billboard Hot 100, debuting at number 88 the week of November 3, 1962 and peaking at number 36 the week of December 29, 1962. It reached no.13 on the UK singles chart. It was also the title track of his album Comin' Home Baby! (with added exclamation mark). Tormé's recording was nominated as Best Male Solo Vocal Performance and Best Rhythm and Blues Performance at the 1963 Grammy Awards.

During the late 1960s the Atlantic label version of the song found renewed fame at the Twisted Wheel Club in Manchester, England. This soul club was instrumental in developing the Northern Soul scene of the 1970s, and Comin' Home Baby found some popularity on the scene. Its "blue-eyed soul" style tends to divide opinions in the scene, however it is known as one of the earliest recorded songs to be played on the scene. Nevertheless, it has remained popular on the Mod (subculture) scene to this day.

== Michael Bublé version ==
"Comin' Home Baby"

Single by Michael Bublé featuring Boyz II Men

from the album Call Me Irresponsible
- Released: April 25, 2008
- Recorded: 2007
- Genre: Pop, Acid Jazz
- Length: 3:27
- Label: 143, Reprise
- Songwriters: Bob Dorough, Benjamin M. Tucker

Michael Bublé singles chronology
"It Had Better Be Tonight" (2007)	"Comin' Home Baby" (2008)	"Haven't Met You Yet" (2009)

Boyz II Men singles chronology
"War" (2008)	"Comin' Home Baby" (2008)	"Mercy Mercy Me (The Ecology)" (2008)

Audio
- "Comin' Home Baby" on YouTube

"Comin' Home Baby" was recorded by Canadian crooner Michael Bublé, and released as the fifth and final single from his 2007 third studio album, Call Me Irresponsible. The single was released on April 25, 2008, exclusively in Germany. It features vocals from the Grammy Award-winning vocal harmony group Boyz II Men. No video was filmed for the song, and there was little to no promotion, causing the release to not appear in any major charts worldwide. The digital download package features a new remix of the track from Frank Popp. A physical version of the single was also made available in Germany.

=== Track listing ===
- German CD single
1. "Comin' Home Baby" (Frank Popp Remix) - 3:09
2. "Comin' Home Baby" (Album Version) - 3:27
