= The Magnificent Trombone of Curtis Fuller =

Studio album by Curtis Fuller Quintet featuring Zoot Sims
- Released: 1961
- Recorded: February 6 & 20, 1961
- Studio: New York City
- Genre: Jazz
- Length: 39:24
- Label: Epic; LA 16013
- Producer: Mike Berniker

Curtis Fuller chronology
Boss of the Soul-Stream Trombone (1960)	The Magnificent Trombone of Curtis Fuller (1961)	South American Cookin' (1961)

The Magnificent Trombone of Curtis Fuller is an album by jazz trombonist Curtis Fuller, released in 1961 on the Epic label.

== Reception ==
Professional ratings
Review scores
Source	Rating
Allmusic	4/5 stars

Allmusic awarded the album 4 stars with its review by Ken Dryden stating, "the leader doesn't disappoint... While this CD may fall just short of essential for hard bop fans, it is recommended.

== Track listing ==
All compositions by Curtis Fuller except as indicated

1. "I'll Be Around" (Alec Wilder) – 3:59
2. "Dream" (Johnny Mercer) – 5:12
3. "Mixed Emotions" (Stuart F. Louchheim) – 4:38
4. "Playpen" – 4:41
5. "Sometimes I Feel Like a Motherless Child" (Traditional) – 3:44
6. "Two Different Worlds" (Al Frisch, Sid Wayne) – 5:54
7. "Teabags" – 4:02
8. "I Loves You, Porgy" (George Gershwin, Ira Gershwin) – 4:29
- Recorded in New York City on February 6 (tracks 2–4, 7 & 8) and February 20 (tracks 1, 5 & 6), 1961

== Personnel ==
- Curtis Fuller – trombone
- Les Spann – flute, guitar
- Walter Bishop, Jr. – piano
- Buddy Catlett (tracks 2–4, 7 & 8), Jimmy Garrison (tracks 1, 5 & 6) – bass
- Stu Martin – drums
