= Crankin' =

Studio album by Curtis Fuller
- Released: 1973
- Recorded: July 27 & 28, 1971
- Studio: Record Plant, New York City
- Genre: Jazz
- Length: 37:46
- Label: Mainstream; MRL 333
- Producer: Bob Shad

Curtis Fuller chronology
| Cabin in the Sky (1962) | Crankin' (1973) | Smokin' (1972) |

Crankin' is an album by American trombonist Curtis Fuller recorded in 1971 and released in 1973 on the Mainstream label.

== Reception ==
Professional ratings
Review scores
| Source | Rating |
|---|---|
| AllMusic | 3.5/5 stars |

The AllMusic website awarded the album 3 1/2 stars stating "At the time, this was his most adventurous playing in quite a while".

== Track listing ==
All compositions by Curtis Fuller

1. "Crankin'" – 6:53
2. "Maze" – 10:56
3. "Black Bath" – 9:30
4. "Ballade" – 4:52
5. "The Spirit" – 5:35

== Personnel ==
- Curtis Fuller – trombone
- Ramon Morris – tenor saxophone
- Bill Hardman – trumpet
- Bill Washer – guitar
- George Cables – electric piano
- Stanley Clarke – bass, electric bass
- Lenny White – drums, electric percussion
