= Boss of the Soul-Stream Trombone =

Studio album by Curtis Fuller
- Released: Early June 1961
- Recorded: December 1960
- Studio: ercury Sound Studios, New York City
- Genre: Jazz
- Length: 42:11
- Label: Warwick; W 2038

Curtis Fuller chronology
Images of Curtis Fuller (1960)	Boss of the Soul-Stream Trombone (1961)	The Magnificent Trombone of Curtis Fuller (1961)

Boss of the Soul-Stream Trombone is an album by American trombonist Curtis Fuller recorded in 1960 and released on the Warwick label. The album was re-released under Freddie Hubbard's name as Gettin' It Together.

== Reception ==
Professional ratings
Review scores
Source	Rating
Allmusic	3/5 stars
The Penguin Guide to Jazz Recordings	3/4 stars

Allmusic awarded the album 3 stars with its review by Scott Yanow stating, "this otherwise unremarkable set is sparked by the inclusion of the young trumpeter Freddie Hubbard (recently arrived from Indianapolis) and tenor saxophonist Yusef Lateef... Hubbard's fiery statements often steal the show".

== Track listing ==
All compositions by Curtis Fuller except as indicated

1. "Chantized" - 4:08
2. "Flutie" - 7:12
3. "If I Were a Bell" (Frank Loesser) - 9:13
4. "But Beautiful" (Johnny Burke, Jimmy Van Heusen) - 5:33
5. "Do I Love You?" (Cole Porter) - 5:57
6. "The Court" - 5:06
7. "Mr. L" - 5:02

== Personnel ==
- Curtis Fuller - trombone
- Freddie Hubbard - trumpet
- Yusef Lateef - tenor saxophone
- Walter Bishop, Jr. - piano
- Buddy Catlett - bass
- Stu Martin - drums
