= Newport '61 =

Live album by Quincy Jones
- Released: 1961
- Recorded: July 3, 1961
- Genre: Jazz
- Label: Mercury
- Producer: Quincy Jones

Quincy Jones chronology
Around the World (1961)	Newport '61 (1961)	The Great Wide World of Quincy Jones: Live! (1961)

Professional ratings
Review scores
Source	Rating
AllMusic	4.5/5 stars
DownBeat	3/5 stars
The Encyclopedia of Popular Music	4/5 stars

Newport '61 is a live album by Quincy Jones that was recorded on July 3, 1961, at the Newport Jazz Festival.

== Track listing ==
1. "Meet B.B." (Quincy Jones) – 3:58
2. "Boy in the Tree" (Jones) – 5:01
3. "Evening in Paris" (Jones) – 5:11
4. "Air Mail Special" (Charlie Christian, Benny Goodman, Jimmy Mundy) – 4:25
5. "Lester Leaps In" (Lester Young) – 6:10
6. "G'won Train" (Patricia Bown) – 6:02
7. "Banja Luka" (Phil Woods) – 5:54
8. "Ghana" (Ernie Wilkins) – 4:06

== Personnel ==
- Quincy Jones – arranger, conductor
- Phil Woods, Joe Lopes – alto saxophone
- Jerome Richardson, Eric Dixon – flute, tenor saxophone
- Pat Patrick – baritone saxophone
- Jimmy Nottingham, Jimmy Maxwell, John Bello, Joe Newman – trumpet
- Julius Watkins – French horn
- Curtis Fuller, Melba Liston, Britt Woodman, Paul Faulise – trombone
- Les Spann – flute, guitar
- Patricia Bown – piano
- Art Davis – double bass
- Stu Martin – drums
