= Dave Bailey (musician) =

American jazz drummer (1926–2023)

- Born: Samuel David Bailey; February 22, 1926; Portsmouth, Virginia, U.S.
- Died: December 28, 2023 (aged 97)
- Genres: Jazz
- Instrument: Drums

Samuel David Bailey (February 22, 1926 – December 28, 2023) was an American jazz drummer.

== Early life ==
Born in Portsmouth, Virginia, Bailey studied drumming in New York City at the Music Center Conservatory after serving in the United States Army Air Forces during World War II.

== Career ==
Bailey played with Herbie Jones from 1951 to 1953 and later with Johnny Hodges, Charles Mingus, Lou Donaldson, Curtis Fuller, Billy Taylor, Art Farmer, Ben Webster, and Horace Silver. Between 1954 and 1968, he played on several sessions led by Gerry Mulligan, and in the 1960s he played with Clark Terry, Kenny Dorham, Grant Green, Lee Konitz, Cal Tjader, Roger Kellaway, and Bob Brookmeyer.

In 1969, he retired from music and became a flight instructor. Beginning in 1973, he worked in music education in New York and was involved with the Jazzmobile.

== Death ==
Bailey died on December 28, 2023, at the age of 97.

== Discography ==
=== As leader ===
- One Foot in the Gutter (Epic, 1960)
- Gettin' Into Somethin' (Epic, 1961)
- Reaching Out (Jazztime, 1961)
- Bash! (Jazzline, 1962)
- 2 Feet in the Gutter (Epic, 1962) includes the very first recording of "Comin' Home Baby"

=== As sideman ===
With George Braith

- Two Souls in One (Blue Note, 1963)

With Bob Brookmeyer

- Traditionalism Revisited (World Pacific, 1957)

With Chris Connor

- Free Spirits (Atlantic, 1962)

With Lou Donaldson

- Swing and Soul (Blue Note, 1957)
- Blues Walk (Blue Note, 1958)
- The Time Is Right (Blue Note, 1959)
- Here 'Tis (Blue Note, 1961)
- Gravy Train (Blue Note, 1961)

With Art Farmer

- Modern Art (United Artists, 1958)

With Curtis Fuller

- Imagination (Savoy, 1959)
- South American Cookin' (Epic, 1961)

With Stan Getz

- Jazz Samba Encore! (Verve, 1963)
- Stan Getz with Guest Artist Laurindo Almeida (Verve, 1963)

With Grant Green

- Green Street (Blue Note, 1961)

With Tubby Hayes

- Tubbs in N.Y. (Fontana, 1961)

With Roger Kellaway

- A Jazz Portrait of Roger Kellaway (Regina, 1963) - with Jim Hall
- The Roger Kellaway Trio (Prestige, 1965)

With Lee Konitz

- Tranquility (Verve, 1957)

With Norman Mapp

- Jazz Ain't Nothin' But Soul (Epic, 1961)

With Howard McGhee

- Nobody Knows You When You're Down And Out (United Artists, 1962)

With Marian McPartland

- Bossa Nova + Soul (Time, 1963)

With Helen Merrill

- The Artistry of Helen Merrill (Mainstream, 1965)

With Gerry Mulligan

- Presenting the Gerry Mulligan Sextet (EmArcy, 1955)
- Mainstream of Jazz (EmArcy, 1956)
- Recorded in Boston at Storyville (Pacific Jazz, 1956)
- The Teddy Wilson Trio & Gerry Mulligan Quartet with Bob Brookmeyer at Newport (Verve, 1957)
- Blues in Time (Verve, 1957) - with Paul Desmond
- The Gerry Mulligan Songbook (World Pacific, 1957)
- Reunion with Chet Baker (World Pacific, 1957)
- Annie Ross Sings a Song with Mulligan! (World Pacific, 1959) - with Annie Ross
- What Is There to Say? (Columbia, 1959)
- The Concert Jazz Band (Verve, 1960)
- Jeru (Columbia, 1962)
- Night Lights (Philips, 1963)
- Relax! (Fontana, 1964)
- Butterfly with Hiccups (Limelight, 1964)
- Something Borrowed - Something Blue (Limelight, 1966)

With Mark Murphy

- That's How I Love the Blues! (Riverside, 1962)

With André Previn

- The Subterraneans (Soundtrack) (MGM, 1960)

With Vi Redd

- Lady Soul (Atco, 1963)

With Charlie Rouse

- Yeah! (Epic, 1961)

With Lalo Schifrin

- Samba Para Dos (Verve, 1963) - with Bob Brookmeyer
- Once a Thief and Other Themes (Verve, 1965)

With Jimmy Scott

- Very Truly Yours (Savoy, 1955)

With Bola Sete

- Bossa Nova (Fantasy, 1962)

With Art Simmons

- Art Simmons Quartet (BAM, 1956)

With Billy Taylor

- Billy Taylor with Four Flutes (Riverside, 1959)

With Clark Terry

- Back in Bean's Bag (Columbia, 1962) - with Coleman Hawkins
- More (Theme From Mondo Cane) (Cameo, 1963) - with Ben Webster
- Tread Ye Lightly (Cameo, 1964)
- Tonight (Mainstream, 1965) - with Bob Brookmeyer
- The Power of Positive Swinging (Mainstream, 1965) - with Bob Brookmeyer
- Gingerbread Men (Mainstream, 1966) - with Bob Brookmeyer
- It's What's Happenin' (Impulse!, 1967)

With Lucky Thompson

- Lucky Thompson Plays Jerome Kern and No More (Moodsville, 1963)

With Ben Webster

- The Soul of Ben Webster (Verve, 1958)
