= Sonny Clark =

American jazz pianist (1931–1963)

Background information
- Born: Conrad Yeatis Clark; July 21, 1931; Herminie, Pennsylvania, U.S.
- Died: January 13, 1963 (aged 31) New York City, U.S.
- Genres: Jazz; hard bop
- Occupation: Musician
- Instrument: Piano
- Years active: 1953–1963
- Label: Blue Note

Conrad Yeatis "Sonny" Clark (July 21, 1931 – January 13, 1963) was an American jazz pianist and composer who became a central figure in the hard bop and post-bop movements. He served as a de facto house pianist and prolific leader and sideman for Blue Note Records.

== Early life ==
On July 21, 1931, Sonny Clark was born in Herminie, Pennsylvania, a small, coal mining town east of Pittsburgh. His parents were originally from Stone Mountain, Georgia, the countryside, where they had met. Not long after Sonny Clark was born, his miner father, Emory Clark, died of “a lingering illness of tuberculosis.” Although, other sources say it was "black lung," a common casualty of mine work. His father's passing occurred less than two weeks after he was born. Sonny was the youngest of eight children. He was raised by his mother and older siblings. Clark reportedly began playing piano at around four years old, and he soon gained attention for his remarkable skill. As Clark grew older, he entertained at Herminie’s sole African-American hotel. He began playing piano for the hotel while still in elementary school. People marveled at his playing, and he was featured in the Pittsburgh Courier, the local newspaper. Clark had also reportedly won a talent show with his playing. In 1943, Clark and his family moved to Pittsburgh. Now twelve years old, he continued to study piano, and he also played the vibraphone and bass in his high school band. At the age of 15, he performed at a 1946 jazz gala at Syria Mosque in Pittsburgh, Pennsylvania. This was the "Night of the Stars" concert, where Clark was sharing the stage with Pittsburgh jazz legends such as Erroll Garner and Billy Strayhorn.

== Later life and Career ==
Clark moved to Los Angeles in 1951, initially visiting an aunt before deciding to remain in California. He began working with saxophonist Wardell Gray and Teddy Charles and became associated with several prominent West Coast jazz musicians. Clark went to San Francisco with Oscar Pettiford and after a couple months, began working with clarinetist Buddy DeFranco in 1953. He worked there for a couple of months before joining DeFranco's group. Clark built a reputation playing jazz venues like the Lighthouse and Surf Club alongside rising jazz giants, including Art Pepper. He accompanied others on records and toured the United States and Europe with guitarist Jimmy Raney and Red Norvo. In January 1956, Clark left DeFranco's group and joined The Lighthouse All-Stars, led by bassist Howard Rumsey.

Returning to the East coast, Clark accompanied singer Dinah Washington in February 1957. He arrived in New York City in April 1957, at the conclusion of Washington's tour. During this time, he was still playing with the Lighthouse All-Stars. In June 1957, Clark recorded as a sideman on a session led by Hank Mobley. Clark quickly struck up a rapport with Blue Note co-founder Alfred Lion. He played dozens of Alfred Lion-produced records, including Tina Brooks' Minor Move. He recorded his debut studio album as a leader, Dial "S" for Sonny (released November 1957 on Blue Note Records), at the Van Gelder Studio (see Rudy van Gelder) in Hackensack, New Jersey, featuring a septet with Art Farmer, Curtis Fuller, and Hank Mobley. In September 1957, Sonny Clark recorded his second leader album, Sonny's Crib (released March 1958), a classic hard-bop sextet date featuring John Coltrane, Donald Byrd, Curtis Fuller, Paul Chambers, and Art Taylor. They also recorded this at the Van Gelder Studio. Clark already had a great reputation, as he reportedly "never played a bad recording date either as a sideman or as a leader." He had already amassed years of experience, despite being young and optimistic. By the time Clark came to record Sonny’s Crib (1957), Clark was trading licks with Thelonious Monk at the home of jazz patron Baroness Pannonica de Koenigswarter, playing with Charles Mingus and Sonny Rollins. Clark was often requested as a sideman by many musicians, partly because of his rhythmic comping. That year, he recorded so many sessions for Blue Note Records, he was practically their in-house pianist.

Throughout his career, Sonny Clark played with many bebop and hard bop players, including Kenny Burrell, Donald Byrd, Paul Chambers, John Coltrane, Dexter Gordon, Art Farmer, Curtis Fuller, Grant Green, Philly Joe Jones, Clifford Jordan, Jackie McLean, Hank Mobley, Art Taylor, Serge Chaloff, Sonny Criss, and Wilbur Ware. He also recorded sessions with Charles Mingus, Sonny Rollins, Billie Holiday, Stanley Turrentine, and Lee Morgan. As a bandleader, Clark recorded albums Dial "S" for Sonny (1957), Sonny's Crib (1957), Sonny Clark Trio (1958), Cool Struttin' (1958), all released on Blue Note Records. His subsequent releases included a second piano trio album titled Sonny Clark Trio (1960, Time Records), Leapin' and Lopin' (1962, Blue Note), Blues in the Night (recorded 1958, released 1979, Blue Note, also released on Standards), and lastly My Conception (recorded 1959, released 1979, Blue Note).

=== Playing Style and Influences ===
Clark's playing style was predominantly influenced by Bud Powell. His playing is described as sparkling and melodic, with impeccable timing and an unerring rhythmic sense. During his time on the West Coast, he adopted elements of the local jazz scene. He also took inspiration from other jazz pianists such as Art Tatum, evident in his early recording of "Willow Weep for Me," which borrows heavily from Tatum's 1949 solo recording of the same tune. Clark's style also reflected the influence of bop pianist Thelonious Monk. Whether a song was upbeat or contemplative, he unleashed inventive, occasionally quirky ideas reflecting sophistication and at times a playful side. In his music, he often adds sly quotes from his other songs and spins clever, improvised bluesy lines.

== Death ==
Clark died in New York City on January 13, 1963 (aged 31). He had performed at Junior's Bar at the Alvin Hotel on Fifty-second and Broadway just two nights before. The official cause was listed as a heart attack, but the likely cause was a heroin overdose.

== Legacy ==
Sonny Clark’s life was short but it burned with musical intensity. Regarded as the quintessential hard bop pianist, Clark unfortunately never received his flowers before he passed away in 1963. After his passing, Sonny Clark has achieved far more critical, musical, and popular acclaim than he ever did in life. Clark defined the Blue Note sound of the late 1950s. Clark's albums, Sonny’s Crib and Cool Struttin are now considered bonafide hard bop classics. Clark's friend, fellow pianist Bill Evans, dedicated the composition "NYC's No Lark" (an anagram of "Sonny Clark") to him after his death, included on Evans's Conversations with Myself (1963). John Zorn, Wayne Horvitz, Ray Drummond, and Bobby Previte recorded an album of Clark's compositions, Voodoo (1985), as the Sonny Clark Memorial Quartet. Blue Note Records' Alfred Lion also made sure that Clark's contributions were well-documented. Clark became a cult icon commemorated by dedicated jazz listeners, producers and musicians, including pianist Bill Evans, Alfred Lion, the Sonny Clark Memorial Quartet and other hard-bop enthusiasts in niche jazz circles. Zorn also recorded several of Clark's compositions with Bill Frisell and George E. Lewis on News for Lulu (1988) and More News for Lulu (1992). Clark's albums were mostly overlooked until a reappraisal in the 1970s, led by Japanese jazz fans who gave his work acclaim.

== Discography ==
=== As leader ===
| Recording date | Title | Label | Year released | Notes |
|---|---|---|---|---|
| 1954-01 | The Sonny Clark Memorial Album | Xanadu | 1976 | Most tracks solo piano; some tracks trio, with Simon Brehm (bass), Bobby White (drums); trio tracks in concert |
| 1955-01 | Oakland, 1955 | Uptown | 1995 | Trio, with Jerry Good (bass), Al Randall (drums); concert |
| 1957-07 | Dial "S" for Sonny | Blue Note | 1957 | One track trio, with Wilbur Ware (bass), Louis Hayes (drums); most tracks sextet, with Art Farmer (trumpet), Curtis Fuller (trombone), Hank Mobley (tenor sax) added |
| 1957-09 | Sonny's Crib | Blue Note | 1958 | Sextet, with Donald Byrd (trumpet), Curtis Fuller (trombone), John Coltrane (tenor sax), Paul Chambers (bass), Art Taylor (drums) |
| 1957-10 | Sonny Clark Trio | Blue Note | 1958 | One track solo piano; most tracks trio, with Paul Chambers (bass), Philly Joe Jones (drums) |
| 1957-12, 1958-01 | Sonny Clark Quintets | Blue Note | 1976 | Quintet with either Clifford Jordan (tenor sax), Kenny Burrell (guitar), Paul Chambers (bass), Pete LaRoca (drums) or Art Farmer (trumpet), Jackie McLean (alto sax), Paul Chambers (bass), Philly Joe Jones (drums) |
| 1958-01 | Cool Struttin' | Blue Note | 1958 | Quintet, with Art Farmer (trumpet), Jackie McLean (alto sax), Paul Chambers (bass), Philly Joe Jones (drums) |
| 1957-10, 1958-11 | The Art of The Trio | Blue Note | 1980 | Some tracks trio with Jymie Merritt (bass), Wes Landers (drums); some tracks trio with Paul Chambers (bass), Philly Joe Jones (drums) |
| 1958-11, 1958-12 | Blues in the Night | Blue Note | 1979 | Trio, with Paul Chambers (bass), Wes Landers (drums) |
| 1957-12, 1959-03 | My Conception | Blue Note | 1979 | Quintet, with Donald Byrd (trumpet), Hank Mobley (tenor sax), Paul Chambers (bass), Art Blakey (drums); reissue added tracks from Sonny Clark Quintets |
| 1960-01 | Sonny Clark Trio also released as The 1960 Time Sessions | Time/Bainbridge/Tompkins Square | 1960 | Trio with George Duvivier (bass), Max Roach (drums) |
| 1961-11 | Leapin' and Lopin' | Blue Note | 1962 | Five tracks quintet, with Tommy Turrentine (trumpet), Charlie Rouse (tenor sax), Butch Warren (bass), Billy Higgins (drums); one track quartet, with Ike Quebec (tenor sax) in place of Turrentine and Rouse |

Compilations

- Standards (Blue Note, 1998)

=== As sideman ===
With Sonny Criss

- Go Man! (Imperial Records, 1956)
- Sonny Criss Plays Cole Porter (Imperial, 1956)

With Buddy DeFranco

- In a Mellow Mood (Verve, 1954)
- Cooking the Blues (Verve, 1955)
- Autumn Leaves (Verve, 1956)
- Sweet and Lovely (Verve, 1956)
- Jazz Tones (Verve, 1956)

With Curtis Fuller

- 1957: Bone & Bari (Blue Note, 1958)
- 1957: Curtis Fuller Volume 3 (Blue Note, 1961)
- 1958: Two Bones (Blue Note, 1980)

With Dexter Gordon

- Go (Blue Note, 1962)
- A Swingin' Affair (Blue Note, 1962)
- Landslide (Blue Note, 1980) – rec. 1961–1962

With Bennie Green

- Soul Stirrin' (Blue Note, 1958)
- Bennie Green Swings the Blues (Enrica, 1960)
- Bennie Green (Time, 1960)
- The 45 Session (Blue Note, 1975) – rec. 1958

With Grant Green

- 1961: Gooden's Corner (Blue Note, 1980)
- 1962: Nigeria (Blue Note, 1980)
- 1962: Oleo (Blue Note, 1980)
- 1962: Born to Be Blue (Blue Note, 1985)
- compilation: The Complete Quartets with Sonny Clark (Blue Note, 1997)

With Jackie McLean

- Jackie's Bag (Blue Note, 1959)
- A Fickle Sonance (Blue Note, 1961)
- Vertigo (Blue Note, 1962)
- Tippin' the Scales (Blue Note, 1962)

With Hank Mobley

- 1957: Hank Mobley (Blue Note, 1958)
- 1957: Poppin' (Blue Note, 1980)
- 1957: Curtain Call (Blue Note, 1984)

With Art Pepper

- 1953: Straight-Ahead Jazz Volume One (Straight Ahead Jazz, 1989)
- 1953: Straight Ahead Jazz Vol. Two (Straight Ahead Jazz, 1989)
- 1953: Art Pepper With Sonny Clark Trio Vol. 2 (Straight Ahead Jazz, 1989)

With Howard Rumsey's Lighthouse All Stars

- Mexican Passport (Contemporary, 1956)
- Music for Lighthousekeeping (Contemporary, 1956)
- Oboe/Flute (Contemporary, 1956)

With Stanley Turrentine

- 1960: Stan "The Man" Turrentine (Time, 1963)
- 1962: Jubilee Shout!!! (Blue Note, 1986)

With others

- Tina Brooks, Minor Move (Blue Note, 1980)
- Serge Chaloff, Blue Serge (Capital, 1956)
- Teddy Charles, Teddy Charles' West Coasters, EP (Prestige, 1953)
- Lou Donaldson, Lou Takes Off (Blue Note, 1958)
- Johnny Griffin, The Congregation (Blue Note, 1957)
- John Jenkins, John Jenkins with Kenny Burrell (Blue Note, 1957)
- Philly Joe Jones, Showcase (Riverside, 1959)
- Clifford Jordan, Cliff Craft (Blue Note, 1957)
- Larance Marable, Tenorman featuring James Clay (Jazz: West, 1956)
- Lee Morgan, Candy (Blue Note, 1958)
- Ike Quebec, Easy Living (Blue Note, 1962)
- Sonny Rollins, The Sound of Sonny (Riverside, 1957)
- Frank Rosolino, I Play Trombone (Bethlehem, 1956)
- Louis Smith, Smithville (Blue Note, 1958)
- Cal Tjader, Tjader Plays Tjazz (Fantasy, 1956)
- Don Wilkerson, Preach Brother! (Blue Note, 1962)
