= Brad Goode =

American jazz musician

Bradley Mitchell Goode (born October 10, 1963, in Chicago) is an American jazz trumpeter, bassist, drummer, composer and music educator.

== Career ==
Goode worked as a sideman with Eddie Harris, Ira Sullivan, Barrett Deems, Ernie Krivda, Jack DeJohnette, Von Freeman, Curtis Fuller, Sheila Jordan, and Paa Kow. He has led his own groups since 1982. He has been a member of the faculties of the American Conservatory of Music, The University of Cincinnati Conservatory of Music, Cuyahoga Community College, New Trier High School and the University of Colorado where he has been Associate Professor of Jazz Studies since 2004. Goode has recorded for SteepleChase, Delmark, and Origin.

Goode graduated from East Lansing High School in Michigan in 1981. He received a Bachelor of Music degree in classical trumpet from the University of Kentucky in 1985. He received an Master of Music in string bass from DePaul University in 1988. His trumpet teachers include Vincent DiMartino, William Adam and Clark Terry. His bass teachers include Larry Gray and Donald Rafael Garrett.

== Discography ==
=== As leader ===
- Shock of the New (Delmark, 1988)
- Brad Goode (SunLight, 1995)
- That Cowboy Jazz with Luke and the Cool Hands (SunLight, 1997)
- Toy Trumpet (SteepleChase, 2000)
- By Myself (SteepleChase, 2001)
- Inside Chicago Vol. 1 with Von Freeman (SteepleChase, 2001)
- Inside Chicago Vol. 2 with Von Freeman (SteepleChase, 2001)
- Inside Chicago Vol. 3 with Von Freeman (SteepleChase, 2002)
- Inside Chicago Vol. 4 with Von Freeman (SteepleChase, 2003)
- Hypnotic Suggestion (Delmark, 2006)
- Jam Session, vol. 17 with Ryan Kisor and John McNeil (SteepleChase, 2006)
- Nature Boy (Delmark, 2007)
- Polytonal Dance Party (Origin, 2008)
- Tight Like This (Delmark, 2010)
- Chicago Red (Origin, 2013)
- Montezuma (Origin, 2014)
- That's Right! (Origin, 2018)
- The Unknown (Origin, 2022)
- The Snake Charmer with the Brad Goode Polytonal Big Band (Origin, 2025)
- Live Your Dream featuring Ernie Watts (Origin, 2026)

=== As sideman ===
- Rony Barrak, Darbouka City (EMI, 2009)
- Richie Cole, The KUVO Sessions Vol. 2 (KUVO, 2008)
- Richie Cole, Mile Hi Madness (Akashic, 2015)
- Barrett Deems, How D'You Like It So Far? (Delmark, 1994)
- Matt Dusk, Live in Las Vegas (Capitol, 2010)
- Matt Dusk, My Funny Valentine (Koch, 2013)
- Matt Dusk, Old School Yule (Magic, 2016)
- Matt Dusk, Jet Set Jazz (Magic, 2018)
- Curtis Fuller, Up Jumped Spring (Delmark, 2004)
- Mandy Harvey, After You've Gone (2011)
- Fred Hess, Hold On (Dazzle, 2009)
- Fred Hess, Into the Open (Allison, 2010)
- Paa Kow, Hand Go Hand Come (2013)
- Paa Kow, Ask (2014)
- Paa Kow, Cook Pot (2017)
- Ernie Krivda, Perdido (Koch, 1997)
- Ernie Krivda, The Band That Swings (Koch, 1999)
- Mollie O'Brien, Saints and Sinners (Remington Road, 2010)
- Joanie Pallatto, Passing Tones (Southport, 1995)
- Ted Piltzecker, Vibes on a Breath (OA2, 2023)
- Ted Piltzecker, Peace Vibes (OA2, 2025)
- Sax Appeal, The Flatiron Suite (2006)
- Steve Vining, Telling Visions (CMN, 2002)
