= One Foot in the Gutter =

Studio album by The Dave Bailey Sextet
- Released: 1960
- Recorded: July 19–20, 1960; NYC
- Genre: Jazz
- Length: 36:01
- Label: Epic LA 16008

Dave Bailey chronology
| One Foot in the Gutter (1960) | Gettin' Into Somethin' (1961) |

One Foot in the Gutter (subtitled A Treasury of Soul) is the debut album led by jazz drummer Dave Bailey which was originally released on the Epic label in 1960.

== Reception ==
Professional ratings
Review scores
| Source | Rating |
|---|---|
| Allmusic | 4/5 stars |

Allmusic reviewer Ken Dryden stated: "The music is consistently loose, fresh and very inspired; egos have been checked at the door as everyone aspires to work together to produce the best results... this release is strong proof that talented musicians don't have to meticulously plan out their set to produce timeless music".

== Track listing ==
1. "One Foot in the Gutter" (Clark Terry) - 10:49
2. "Well, You Needn't" (Thelonious Monk) - 11:50
3. "Sandu" (Clifford Brown) - 20:57

== Personnel ==
- Dave Bailey - drums
- Clark Terry - trumpet, flugelhorn
- Curtis Fuller - trombone
- Junior Cook - tenor saxophone
- Horace Parlan - piano
- Peck Morrison - bass
