= Blues in the Night (Sonny Clark album) =

Studio album by Sonny Clark
- Released: 1979
- Recorded: December 7, 1958 (#1–7); November 16, 1958 (#8–14); Van Gelder Studio, Hackensack
- Genre: Jazz
- Length: 37:39 (original LP); 61:22 (2014 CD)
- Label: Blue Note; GXF 3051
- Producer: Alfred Lion

Sonny Clark chronology
The Art of The Trio (1958)	Blues in the Night (1979)	My Conception (1958)

Alternative cover
- 1998 Japanese CD reissue

Professional ratings
Review scores
Source	Rating
Allmusic	3/5 stars

Blues in the Night is a studio album by pianist Sonny Clark, featuring performances by Clark, Paul Chambers and drummer Wes Landers. It was recorded in December 1958, but shelved until being released in Japan in 1979, as GXF 3051. All the tracks can also be found on the compilation Standards. In 2014, it was reissued on a 24-bit remastered CD in Japan, as part of a limited series. The CD also included the six original pieces from The Art of The Trio.

== Track listing ==
1. "Can't We Be Friends?" (James, Swift) - 4:20
2. "I Cover the Waterfront" (Green, Heyman) - 4:41
3. "Somebody Loves Me" (Gerswhin, DeSylva, MacDonald) - 4:17
4. "Blues in the Night" (Arlen, Mercer) - 5:57
5. "Blues in the Night" [Alternate Take] - 7:15
6. "All of You" (Porter) - 3:55
7. "Dancing in the Dark" (Schwartz, Dietz) - 3:31
8. "Gee, Baby, Ain't I Good to You" [Alternate Take] - 3:53

Bonus tracks on 2014 Japanese CD reissue (UCCQ-5011):

9. "Ain't No Use" (Leroy Kirkland, Sidney Wyche) - 4:50
10. "Black Velvet" (Illinois Jacquet, Jimmy Mundy) - 3:23
11. "I'm Just a Lucky So-and-So (Mack David, Duke Ellington) - 4:32
12. "Gee, Baby, Ain't I Good to You" (Andy Razaf, Don Redman) - 4:00
13. "The Breeze and I" (Tutti Camarata, Ernesto Lecuona, Al Stillman) - 3:09
14. "I Can't Give You Anything But Love" (Dorothy Fields, Jimmy McHugh) - 3:49

== Personnel ==
- Sonny Clark - piano
- Paul Chambers - bass (Tracks 1–7)
- Jymie Merritt - bass (Tracks 8–14)
- Wes Landers - drums
