= The Old Ship of Zion =

- by M. J. Cartwright
- Genre: Hymn
- Written: ~1889

"The Old Ship of Zion" is a Christian hymn written by M. J. Cartwright sometime around 1889 (exact date not known), played to a tune written by Daniel B. Towner.

The song was used in the eighth episode of the fourth season of the television series Boardwalk Empire. The episode is also named after the hymn.

== Sources ==
- Biography of the author
- Recording by The Mighty Wonders at Waco Tribune-Herald
