= Gettin' Into Somethin' =

Studio album by The Dave Bailey Sextet
- Released: 1961
- Recorded: October 26 & 27, 1960; NYC
- Genre: Jazz
- Length: 36:01
- Label: Epic LA 16011
- Producer: Michael Berniker

Dave Bailey chronology
| One Foot in the Gutter (1960) | Gettin' Into Somethin' (1961) | Reaching Out (1961) |

Gettin' Into Somethin' is an album by jazz drummer Dave Bailey which was originally released on the Epic label in 1961.

== Reception ==
Professional ratings
Review scores
| Source | Rating |
|---|---|
| AllMusic | 4.5/5 stars |

AllMusic reviewer Ken Dryden described it as it a "first-rate record".

== Track listing ==
1. "Slop Jah" (Clark Terry) - 8:30
2. "Little Old Mongoose" (Clark Terry, Archie Moore) - 6:26
3. "Evad Smurd" (Clark Terry) - 3:46
4. "Blues for J. P." (Horace Parlan) - 17:19

== Personnel ==
- Dave Bailey - drums
- Clark Terry - trumpet, flugelhorn
- Curtis Fuller - trombone
- Charlie Rouse - tenor saxophone
- Horace Parlan - piano
- Peck Morrison - bass
