= Sonny Clark Trio =

Studio album by Sonny Clark
- Released: May 1958
- Recorded: October 13, 1957
- Studio: Van Gelder Studio; Hackensack, New Jersey
- Genre: Hard bop
- Length: 35:31 (LP); 48:53 (CD)
- Label: Blue Note; BLP 1579
- Producer: Alfred Lion

Sonny Clark chronology
Sonny's Crib (1958)	Sonny Clark Trio (1958)	Cool Struttin' (1958)

Sonny Clark Trio is an album by the jazz pianist Sonny Clark released through Blue Note Records in May 1958. It was recorded in October 1957. The trio features rhythm section Paul Chambers and Philly Joe Jones.

== Reception ==
Professional ratings
Review scores
Source	Rating
AllMusic	4/5 stars
The Penguin Guide to Jazz Recordings	3.5/4 stars

The AllMusic review by Michael G. Nastos states, "Mainstream jazz lovers will find much to enjoy about this edition of Clark discography, and a very good primer for recordings of his original music to come later in his career."

== Track listing ==
Side 1
No.	Title	Writer(s)	Length
1.	"Be-Bop"	Dizzy Gillespie	9:54
2.	"I Didn't Know What Time It Was"	Richard Rodgers; Lorenz Hart	4:22
3.	"Two Bass Hit"	Gillespie; John Lewis	3:45

Side 2
No.	Title	Writer(s)	Length
1.	"Tadd's Delight"	Tadd Dameron	6:02
2.	"Softly, As in a Morning Sunrise"	Oscar Hammerstein II; Sigmund Romberg	6:33
3.	"I'll Remember April"	Gene DePaul; Patricia Johnston; Don Raye	4:55

CD bonus tracks
No.	Title	Writer(s)	Length
7.	"I Didn't Know What Time It Was" (alternate take)	Rodgers; Hart	4:20
8.	"Two Bass Hit" (alternate take)	Gilespie; Lewis	4:01
9.	"Tadd's Delight" (alternate take)	Dameron	5:01

== Personnel ==
=== Sonny Clark Trio ===
- Sonny Clark – piano
- Paul Chambers – bass (except "I'll Remember April")
- Philly Joe Jones – drums (except "I'll Remember April")

=== Technical personnel ===
- Alfred Lion – producer
- Rudy Van Gelder – recording engineer
- Reid Miles – design
- Francis Wolff – photography

== Charts ==
Chart performance for Sonny Clark Trio
Chart (2023)	Peak position
Belgian Albums (Ultratop Flanders)	200
