= Cool Struttin' =

Studio album by Sonny Clark
- Released: August 1958
- Recorded: January 5, 1958
- Studios: Van Gelder Studio; Hackensack, NJ
- Genre: Hard bop
- Length: 37:34 (LP); 53:35 (CD)
- Labels: Blue Note; BLP 1588
- Producer: Alfred Lion

Sonny Clark chronology
Sonny Clark Trio (1958)	Cool Struttin' (1958)	The Art of The Trio (1958)

Cool Struttin' is a studio album by the jazz pianist and composer Sonny Clark. It was released through Blue Note Records in August 1958. The recording was made on January 5, 1958 with a group for the session consisting of horn section Art Farmer and Jackie McLean, and Miles Davis Quintet rhythm section Philly Joe Jones and Paul Chambers.

== Background ==
=== Album cover ===
The album cover, designed by Reid Miles, uses an original photograph by Francis Wolff of Alfred Lion's wife, Ruth. In 1991, Blue Note released a Christmas themed CD called Yule Struttin' with a cover derived from the sleeve design for this album.

== Reception ==
Professional ratings
Review scores
Source	Rating
AllMusic	5/5 stars
The Rolling Stone Jazz Record Guide	3/5 stars
The Penguin Guide to Jazz Recordings	4/4 stars

The New York Times called Cool Struttin' an "enduring hard-bop classic".

According to The Stereo Times, the album enjoys "a nearly cult status among hardcore jazz followers", a reputation AllMusic asserts it deserves "for its soul appeal alone".

== Track listing ==
All tracks are written by Sonny Clark, except as noted.

Side 1
No.	Title	Length
1.	"Cool Struttin'"	9:23
2.	"Blue Minor"	10:19

Side 2
No.	Title	Writer(s)	Length
1.	"Sippin' at Bells"	Miles Davis	8:18
2.	"Deep Night"	Charles E. Henderson; Rudy Vallée	10:19

CD reissue bonus tracks
No.	Title	Writer(s)	Length
5.	"Royal Flush"		9:00
6.	"Lover"	Lorenz Hart; Richard Rodgers	7:01

== Personnel ==
=== Musicians ===
- Sonny Clark – piano
- Art Farmer – trumpet
- Jackie McLean – alto saxophone
- Paul Chambers – bass
- Philly Joe Jones – drums

=== Technical personnel ===
==== Original ====
- Alfred Lion – producer
- Rudy Van Gelder – recording engineer
- Reid Miles – design
- Francis Wolff – photography
- Nat Hentoff – liner notes

==== Reissue ====
- Michael Cuscuna – producer, additional liner notes
- Ron McMaster – digital transfer
- Hideki Satoh – original liner notes
  - Mary Ann – translator
