= Album of the Year (Art Blakey album) =

Studio album by Art Blakey and the Jazz Messengers
- Released: 1981
- Recorded: April 12, 1981
- Studios: Davout Studios, Paris, France
- Genre: Jazz
- Labels: Timeless; SJP 155
- Producer: Wim Wigt

Art Blakey and the Jazz Messengers chronology
Art Blakey in Sweden (1981)	Album of the Year (1981)	Straight Ahead (1981)

Album of the Year is an album by drummer Art Blakey and the Jazz Messengers recorded in 1981 in Paris and released on the Dutch Timeless label. A 2015 re-issue on the Japanese "Solid Records" label offers two additional tracks recorded in 1982 (and previously released on Oh-By the Way) with a different line up including Terrence Blanchard, Donald Harrison and Johnny O'Neal.

== Reception ==
Professional ratings
Review scores
Source	Rating
AllMusic	4/5 stars
The Rolling Stone Jazz Record Guide	5/5 stars

Scott Yanow of AllMusic states, "The 1981 edition of The Jazz Messengers featured more than its share of young greats, reinforcing drummer Art Blakey's recognition as jazz's greatest talent scout. This high-quality set, recorded in Paris, includes new material".

== Track listing ==
1. "Cheryl" (Charlie Parker) - 5:23
2. "Ms. B.C." (Pamela Watson) - 6:47
3. "In Case You Missed It" (Robert Watson) - 8:53
4. "Little Man" (Charles Fambrough) - 7:19
5. "Witch Hunt" (Wayne Shorter) - 6:26
6. "The Soulful Mr. Timmons" (James Williams) - 7:46

== Personnel ==
- Art Blakey - drums
- Wynton Marsalis - trumpet
- Robert Watson - alto saxophone
- Bill Pierce - tenor saxophone
- James Williams - piano
- Charles Fambrough - bass
