= Art Blakey and the Jazz Messengers (disambiguation) =

Art Blakey and the Jazz Messengers, or simply the Jazz Messengers, was a 1955–1990 jazz combo.

The name may also refer to several albums by the group:

- The Jazz Messengers (album), 1956
- Art Blakey's Jazz Messengers with Thelonious Monk, 1958
- Art Blakey and the Jazz Messengers (1958 album), or Moanin'
- Art Blakey and the Jazz Messengers (1961 album)

== See also ==
- A Jazz Message, a 1964 quartet album by Art Blakey
