= Live at Kimball's =

Live album by Art Blakey and the Jazz Messengers
- Released: 1985
- Recorded: April 13, 1985
- Genre: Jazz
- Label: Concord Jazz
- Producer: Frank Dorritie

Art Blakey and the Jazz Messengers chronology
New York Scene (1984)	Live at Kimball's (1985)	Feeling Good (1986)

Live at Kimball's is a live album recorded on April 13, 1985 at Kimball's in San Francisco by Art Blakey and the Jazz Messengers.

== Reception ==
Professional ratings
Review scores
Source	Rating
Allmusic	4/5 stars

Scott Yanow of Allmusic said this group was "particularly talented, all of its sessions are well worth acquiring by lovers of modern hard bop."

== Track listing ==
1. "Second Thoughts" (Mulgrew Miller)
2. "I Love You" (Cole Porter)
3. "Jody" (Walter Davis, Jr., Wynton Marsalis)
4. "Old Folks" (Dedette Lee Hill, Willard Robison)
5. "You and the Night and the Music" (Howard Dietz, Arthur Schwartz)
6. "Polka Dots and Moonbeams" (Johnny Burke, Jimmy van Heusen)
7. "Dr. Jackie" (Jackie McLean)

== Personnel ==
- Art Blakey - drums
- Terence Blanchard - trumpet
- Donald Harrison - alto saxophone
- Jean Toussaint - tenor saxophone
- Mulgrew Miller - piano
- Lonnie Plaxico - bass
