= Webb City =

Webb City may refer to:

- Webb City, Arkansas
- Webb City, Missouri
- Webb City, Oklahoma
- Webb City, a song from the 1981 album Art Blakey in Sweden

== See also ==
- Webb's City
