= James Williams (musician) =

American jazz pianist (1951–2004)

James Williams (March 8, 1951 – July 20, 2004) was an American jazz pianist.

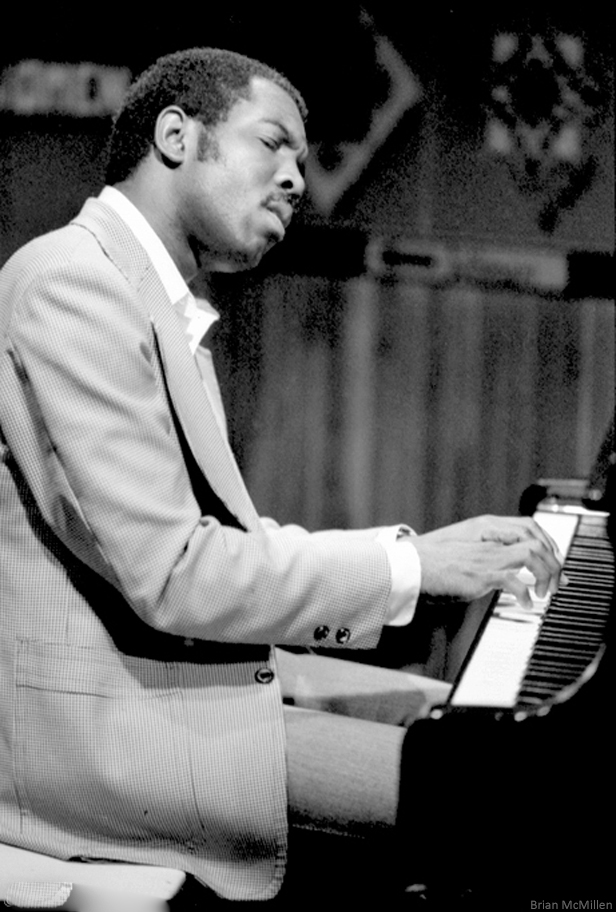
Williams at Keystone Korner San Francisco 1980

== Early life ==
James Williams was born on March 8, 1951, in Memphis, Tennessee. He began piano studies at age 13 and was subsequently an organist at Eastern Star Baptist Church in Memphis, a position he held for six years. He earned a B.S. in Music Education at Memphis State University, where he also formed friendships with fellow Memphis pianists Mulgrew Miller and Donald Brown. A devotee of the late Memphis pianist Phineas Newborn, Jr., Williams took time to delve into his hometown's jazz heritage, associating with pianist Harold Mabern, bassist Jamil Nasser, and saxophonists George Coleman and Frank Strozier, among others.

== Later life and career ==
At 22, Williams moved to Boston to accept a teaching position at the Berklee College of Music. A year later, he joined drummer Alan Dawson's group, which provided support in the Boston area for touring artists including Art Farmer, Milt Jackson, Sonny Stitt, Pat Martino, Jean Carn, Red Norvo, and Arnett Cobb. In 1977, Williams recorded his first album as a leader, played his first concert featuring his original compositions, and first met Art Blakey. That encounter ultimately led to James's resigning from the Berklee faculty for a four-year, 10-album tenure with the Jazz Messengers, as part of a lineup which included Wynton Marsalis, Bobby Watson, Bill Pierce and Charles Fambrough. After leaving the Messengers in 1981, James remained in Boston, re-joining Alan Dawson and also playing independently with such artists as Thad Jones, Joe Henderson, Clark Terry, Chet Baker and Benny Carter.

In 1984, Williams moved to New York, residing in Brooklyn and becoming deeply involved in the city's musical activities, omnipresent in jazz clubs not only as a performer but also as a devoted listener. He played, toured and recorded with such artists as Dizzy Gillespie, Ray Brown, George Duvivier, Art Farmer, Kenny Burrell, Elvin Jones, Freddie Hubbard and Tony Williams.

As a leader, Williams's recordings include traditional piano–bass–drums trios; larger ensembles with several horns; jazz trio with the Boys Choir of Harlem and guest Dianne Reeves; a four-piano format with rhythm section; a sextet with a front line featuring three saxophonists; a classic setting for Clark Terry; a solo piano recital in the Maybeck series; and his last group, "Intensive Care Unit", a jazz-gospel ensemble featuring two vocalists, saxophone and rhythm section.

After self-producing his own album Alter Ego for Sunnyside Records in 1984, he produced albums for several other musicians, including Phineas Newborn, Jr., Harold Mabern, Donald Brown, Billy Pierce, Bill Easley, Tony Reedus and Geoff Keezer. In 1993, Williams focused his production activities under the umbrella of his company, Finas Sound Productions, Inc. The name is a phonetic tribute to Phineas Newborn, Jr., who pronounced his name "Fine'-us". Finas Sound produced numerous concerts and recordings, including its "Musical Tributes" and "The Key Players" series, both held at Merkin Concert Hall in Manhattan.

Williams was a prolific composer. Second Floor Music publishes a folio of solo piano arrangements by Williams for 13 of his original compositions. Several of his tunes appear on other artists’ albums, including those of Art Farmer, Kenny Barron, Victor Lewis, Gary Burton and Roy Hargrove.

Williams was a longtime educator. As early as 1975, in addition to his responsibilities at Berklee, he was a faculty member of the National Combo Camp. He also held a teaching position at the Hartt School of Music during the 1984–85 academic year, was a regular contributor to the International Association of Jazz Educators, and was artist-in-residence and presented clinics, demonstration-lectures and workshops at numerous institutions. He was a charter member of the Smithsonian Jazz Masterworks Orchestra under the direction of David Baker and Gunther Schuller.

In 1999, he became Director of Jazz Studies at William Paterson University, succeeding Rufus Reid and Thad Jones in that position. He taught a full-time load of ensembles and lessons, hosted dozens of pre-concert interviews and performed on the campus's Jazz Room Series as well as with members of the classical faculty. He continued in this role until his unexpected death of liver cancer in New York City in 2004. The James Williams Archive is now part of the Living Jazz Archives on the William Paterson campus, containing his LP collection, original manuscripts, hundreds of performance tapes, photos and awards.

Blues band Lady Dottie and the Diamonds dedicated their debut album Livin' It Up (2007) to the memory of James Williams.

== Discography ==
=== As leader/co-leader ===
- 1979: Everything I Love, The James Williams Quartet (Concord Jazz)
- 1981: Images (Of Things To Come) quartet with Bill Pierce (Concord Jazz)
- 1982: The Arioso Touch, The James Williams Trio (Concord Jazz)
- 1984: Alter Ego (Sunnyside)
- 1985: Progress Report (Sunnyside, sextet)
- 1987: The Magical Trio 1 with Ray Brown, Art Blakey (Emarcy)
- 1987: The Magical Trio 2 with Ray Brown, Elvin Jones (Emarcy)
- 1989: Meet the Magical Trio (Emarcy)
- 1990: Four Play (DIW) with Clifford Jordan, Richard Davis and Ronnie Burrage
- 1991: Up to the Minute Blues with Joe Henderson (DIW)
- 1991: James Williams Meets the Saxophone Masters with Joe Henderson, George Coleman, Bill Pierce (DIW)
- 1994: Truth Justice & Blues, Intensive Care Unit (Evidence)
- 1995: James Williams at Maybeck (Concord)
- 1997: Awesome! with Ray Brown Elvin Jones (DIW)
- 1998: We've Got What You Need, Intensive Care Unit (Evidence)
- 2003: Jazz Dialogues: Vol. 1 Willpower, Vol. 2 Focus, Vol. 3 Out of Nowhere, Vol. 4 Music for a While

=== As backing musician ===
With Karrin Allyson

- Ballads – Remembering John Coltrane (Concord Jazz, 2001)

With Art Blakey

- In My Prime Vol. 1 (Timeless, 1977)
- In My Prime Vol. 2 (Timeless, 1977)
- In This Korner (Concord Jazz, 1978)
- Reflections in Blue (Timeless, 1978)
- Night in Tunisia: Digital Recording (Philips, 1979)
- One by One (Palcoscenico, 1979)
- Live at Montreux and Northsea (Timeless, 1980)
- Art Blakey in Sweden (Amigo, 1981)
- Album of the Year (Timeless, 1981)
- Straight Ahead (Concord, 1981)

With Kenny Burrell

- Then Along Came Kenny (Evidence, 1993 [1996])
- Midnight at the Village Vanguard (Evidence, 1993, 1997)
- Love is the Answer (Concord, 1998)

With Art Farmer

- Something to Live For: The Music of Billy Strayhorn (Contemporary, 1987)
- Blame It on My Youth (Contemporary, 1988)
- PhD (Contemporary, 1989)

With Tal Farlow

- Cookin' on all Burners (Concord, 1983)

With Curtis Fuller

- Four on the Outside (Timeless, 1978)

With Tom Harrell

- Sail Away (Contemporary, 1993)
- Visions (Contemporary, 1991)

With Howard Johnson and Gravity

- Gravity!!! (Verve, 1996)

With Emily Remler

- Take Two (Concord, 1982)

With Jack Walrath

- Master of Suspense (Blue Note, 1987)
- Neohippus (Blue Note, 1988)

With Sadao Watanabe

- Parker's Mood(Live At Bravas Club '85) (Electra, 1985)
- Tokyo Dating (Electra, 1985)
