= Jean Toussaint =

Jazz musician (born 1960)

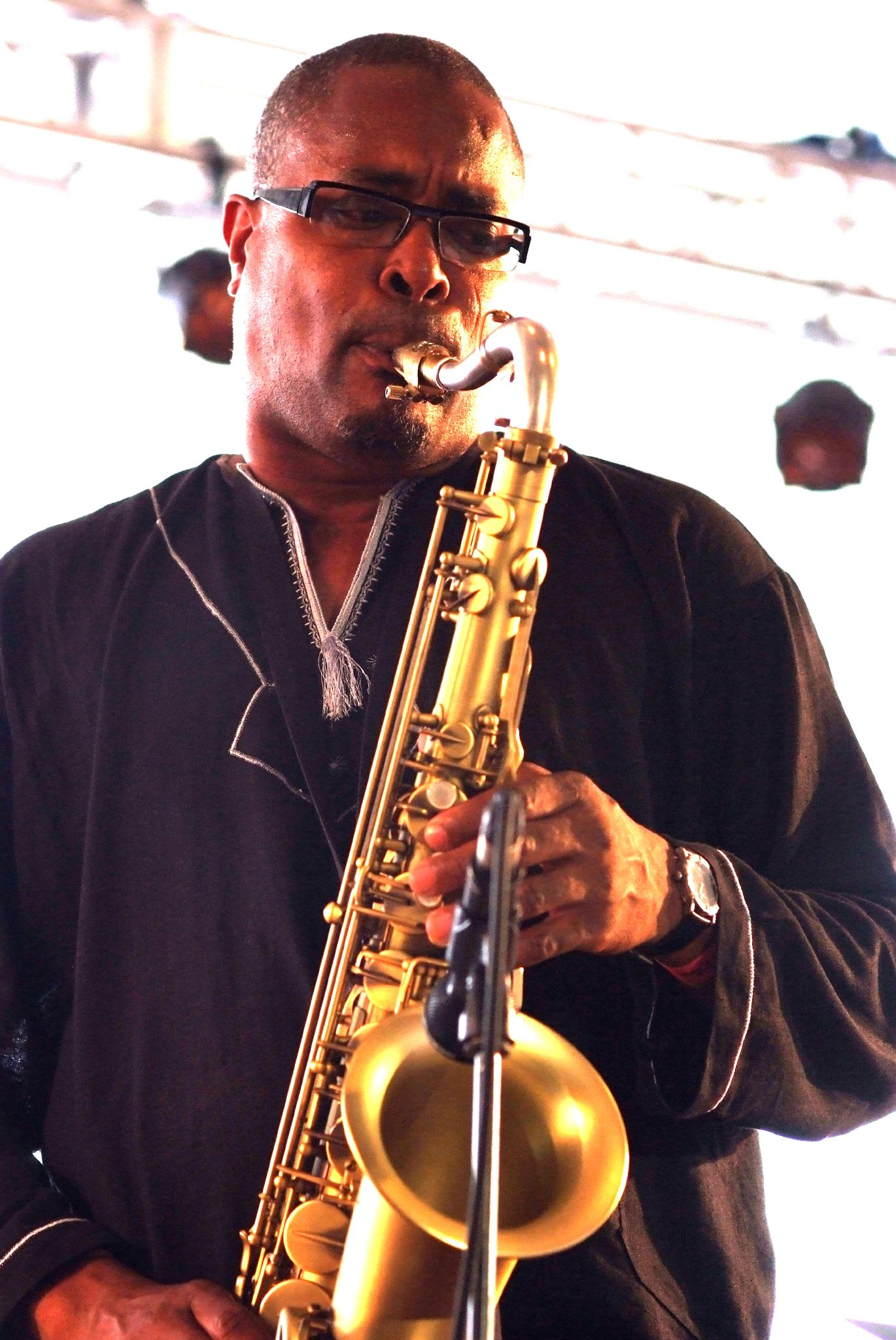
- Toussaint in a 2007 performance.

Background information
- Born: 27 July 1960 (age 65); Aruba, Dutch Antilles
- Genres: Jazz
- Occupation: Musician
- Instrument: Saxophone
- Years active: 1982–present
- Labels: Lyte BMG, World Circuit
- Website: jeantoussaint.com

Jean Toussaint (born July 27, 1960) is an American jazz tenor and soprano saxophonist.

== Life and career ==
Toussaint was born in Aruba, Dutch Antilles, and was raised in Saint Thomas and New York City. He learned to play calypso as a child and attended Berklee College of Music in the late 1970s, studying under Bill Pierce (saxophonist). In 1979, Toussaint formed a group with Wallace Roney and from 1982 to 1986 was a member of Art Blakey and the Jazz Messengers alongside Terence Blanchard, Donald Harrison, Mulgrew Miller and Lonnie Plaxico. With Blakey, Toussaint recorded three studio albums, including New York Scene, which won a Grammy for Best Jazz Instrumental Performance.

In 1987, Toussaint moved to London, England, when he was invited to be artist-in-residence at the Guildhall School of Music by Lionel Grigson, at the time the school's professor of jazz. In the late 1980s, Toussaint had a regular slot at the fabled Dingwalls club in Camden Town on Sunday afternoons. Since then, Toussaint has maintained a profile as a band leader in the UK and Europe, playing with British musicians including, among others, Steve Williamson, Courtney Pine, Julian Joseph, Jason Rebello, Cleveland Watkiss. Toussaint has also performed in groups led by McCoy Tyner, Gil Evans, Kirk Lightsey, Cedar Walton, Max Roach, Horace Silver and Jeff Tain Watts. In addition, Toussaint has collaborated with Lionel Loueke.

Toussaint has released 10 albums as a leader, his most recent entitled Tate Song in February 2014 with LYTE Records.

In 2015/16, Toussaint devised a project dedicated to his mentor Blakey. The project was entitled "Roots & Herbs: The Blakey Project" and featured an all-star lineup of British jazz musicians, including Julian Joseph, Byron Wallen, Dennis Rollins, Jason Rebello and Shane Forbes. The group toured the UK extensively throughout 2015 / 2016.

== Discography ==
As leader

- Impressions of Coltrane (Fever, 1987)
- What Goes Around, (World Circuit, 1991)
- Life I Want (New Note, 1996)
- Nazaire Who's Blues (Jazz House, 1996)
- Back to Back (Jazz Focus, 1998)
- Street Above The Underground (BMG, 2000)
- Blue Black (Blue Geodesics, 2002)
- Continuum Act One (Space Time, 2004)
- Live in Paris and London (Space Time, 2010)
- Tate Song (Lyte, 2014)

With Art Blakey

- New York Scene (Concord Jazz, 1984)
- Blue Night (Timeless, 1985)
- Feeling Good (Delos, 1986)

With Kirk Lightsey

- Kirk 'n Marcus (Criss Cross Jazz, 1987) with Marcus Belgrave
