= Buttercorn Lady =

Live album by Art Blakey and The New Jazz Messengers
- Released: March 1966
- Recorded: January 1 & 9, 1966
- Venue: The Lighthouse, Hermosa Beach, California
- Genre: Jazz
- Length: 40:52
- Label: Limelight; LM 82034
- Producer: Jack Tracy

Art Blakey chronology
Soul Finger (1965)	Buttercorn Lady (1966)	Hold On, I'm Coming (1966)

The Jazz Messengers chronology
Soul Finger (1965)	Buttercorn Lady (1966)	Jazz Messengers '70 (1970)

Buttercorn Lady is a live album by drummer Art Blakey's New Jazz Messengers recorded at The Lighthouse jazz club in 1966 and originally released that year on the Limelight label. The album was the first commercial recording to feature pianist Keith Jarrett, who had joined Blakey's band a few months earlier.

== Reception ==
Professional ratings
Review scores
Source	Rating
Allmusic	4/5 stars
The Rolling Stone Jazz Record Guide	3/5 stars

Scott Yanow of Allmusic stated that "this particular version of The Jazz Messengers only had the opportunity to record this one excellent live LP (which is currently out of print) but proved to be a worthy successor to their more acclaimed predecessors".

== Track listing ==
All compositions are by Chuck Mangione except where noted.

1. "Buttercorn Lady" - 3:10
2. "Recuerdo" - 14:20
3. "The Theme" (Kenny Dorham) - 2:20
4. "Between Races" - 4:32
5. "My Romance" (Richard Rodgers, Lorenz Hart) - 6:07
6. "Secret Love" (Paul Francis Webster, Sammy Fain) - 9:00

== Personnel ==
- Art Blakey - drums
- Chuck Mangione - trumpet
- Frank Mitchell - tenor saxophone
- Keith Jarrett - piano
- Reggie Johnson - bass
