= Straight Ahead (Art Blakey album) =

Live album by Art Blakey and the Jazz Messengers
- Released: 1981
- Recorded: June 1981; Keystone Korner, San Francisco, California
- Genre: Jazz
- Length: 40:37
- Label: Concord Jazz; CJ 168
- Producer: Frank Dorritie

Art Blakey chronology
Album of the Year (1981)	Straight Ahead (1981)	Killer Joe (1981)

The Jazz Messengers chronology
Album of the Year (1981)	Straight Ahead (1981)	Keystone 3 (1982)

Straight Ahead is a live album by drummer Art Blakey and The Jazz Messengers recorded at the Keystone Korner in San Francisco in 1981 and released on the Concord Jazz label.

== Reception ==
Professional ratings
Review scores
Source	Rating
AllMusic	4/5 stars
The Rolling Stone Jazz Record Guide	4/5 stars

Scott Yanow, writing for AllMusic, described it as "One of the best recordings by Art Blakey's 1981 Jazz Messengers... Highly recommended".

== Track listing ==
1. "Falling In Love with Love" (Lorenz Hart, Richard Rodgers) - 7:52
2. "My Romance" (Hart, Rodgers) - 3:30
3. "Webb City" (Bud Powell) - 9:53
4. "How Deep Is the Ocean?" (Irving Berlin) - 9:32
5. "E.T.A." (Bobby Watson) - 6:09
6. "The Theme" (Miles Davis) - 2:56

== Personnel ==
- Art Blakey - drums
- Wynton Marsalis - trumpet
- Bobby Watson - alto saxophone
- Bill Pierce - tenor saxophone
- James Williams - piano
- Charles Fambrough - bass
