= Sproles =

Sproles is a surname. Notable people with the surname include:

- Darren Sproles (born 1983), American football player
- Victor Sproles (1927–2005), American jazz bassist
