= Gypsy Folk Tales =

Studio album by Art Blakey and the Jazz Messengers
- Released: 1977
- Recorded: February 14–17 & 28 and March 1, 1977; Sound Ideas Studio A, New York City
- Genre: Jazz
- Labels: Roulette; SR 5008
- Producer: Fred Bailin

Art Blakey and the Jazz Messengers chronology
Backgammon (1977)	Gypsy Folk Tales (1977)	In My Prime Vol. 1 (1977)

Gypsy Folk Tales is an album by drummer Art Blakey and the Jazz Messengers recorded in 1977 and released on the Roulette label.

== Reception ==
Professional ratings
Review scores
Source	Rating
Allmusic	2.5/5 stars
The Rolling Stone Jazz Record Guide	2/5 stars

Allmusic awarded the album 2½ stars stating "This Roulette LP includes six fairly recent originals in addition to a pair of numbers co-written by drummer Art Blakey with saxophonist Bob Mintzer. Davis's "Gypsy Folk Tales" and "Jodi" are the best-known songs and the hard-bop oriented solos are consistently fresh".

== Track listing ==
All compositions by Walter Davis, Jr. except as indicated

1. "Jodi" – 10:15
2. "Cami" – 6:55
3. "Miwako" (Art Blakey, Bob Mintzer) – 4:27
4. "Gypsy Folk Tales" – 7:36
5. "Time Will Tell" (Bobby Watson) – 6:58
6. "Ronnie's a Dynamite Lady" – 7:54
7. "Hawkman" (Watson) – 10:30
8. "Malibu" (Blakey, Mintzer) – 4:42

== Personnel ==
- Art Blakey – drums
- Valery Ponomarev – trumpet
- Bobby Watson – alto saxophone
- David Schnitter – tenor saxophone
- Walter Davis, Jr. – piano
- Dennis Irwin – bass
