= 'S Make It =

Studio album by Art Blakey and the Jazz Messengers
- Released: 1965
- Recorded: November 15–16, 1964; Los Angeles
- Genre: Jazz
- Length: 35:13 original LP
- Label: Limelight; 86001
- Producer: Jack Tracy

Art Blakey and the Jazz Messengers chronology
| Golden Boy (1964) | 'S Make It (1965) | Soul Finger (1965) |

'S Make It (slang for 'Let's go') is a recording by the hard bop Art Blakey jazz ensemble. It was recorded in Los Angeles in 1964 and issued on the Limelight label. Following the departure of stars from his 1961 to 1964 band, Freddie Hubbard, Wayne Shorter and Cedar Walton, it includes previous Blakey alumni and newer players. This was trombonist Curtis Fuller's last recording as a regular member of the group, though he would return to record sporadically with Blakey in the 1970s and 80s. The album was re-released on Verve in 2004.

== Reception ==
Professional ratings
Review scores
| Source | Rating |
|---|---|
| Allmusic | 4/5 stars |
| The Penguin Guide to Jazz Recordings | 3/4 stars |

Jeffery S. McMillan has called the release one of Blakey's most underrated works and that it exemplifies his 1964–1965 work. In a review in the December 1965 issue of Black World, the title track is described as "a diabolical concept, a dark image, invoking the innermost caverns of Manhattan." David Rickert calls the album "a fine Messengers album and a good example of the drummer's consistently satisfying work." Russ Musto referred to the release as a "return to a more soulful sound". Ken Dryden stated in his Allmusic review that "It's a shame that this was the only recording by this particular lineup of the Jazz Messengers, as [John] Gilmore's strong blowing complements Morgan very well".

== Track listing ==
| No. | Title | Writer(s) | Length |
|---|---|---|---|
| 1. | "Faith" | Stan Freeman/Jack Lawrence | 3:46 |
| 2. | "'S Make It" | Lee Morgan | 5:40 |
| 3. | "Waltz for Ruth" | John Hicks | 5:46 |
| 4. | "One for Gamal" | Morgan | 3:41 |
| 5. | "Little Hughie" | Curtis Fuller | 5:35 |
| 6. | "Olympia" | Hicks | 5:49 |
| 7. | "Lament for Stacy" | Morgan | 5:12 |

== Personnel ==
Musicians

- Art Blakey – drums
- Lee Morgan – trumpet
- Curtis Fuller – trombone
- John Gilmore – tenor sax
- John Hicks – piano
- Victor Sproles – bass

Production

- Jack Tracy – producer
- Ken Druker – executive producer
- Pete Romano – engineer
- Dave Wiechman – engineer
- Kip Smith – mixing
- Leonard Feather – liner notes
- Don Bronstein – cover photo
