= The Jazz Messengers =

American jazz band

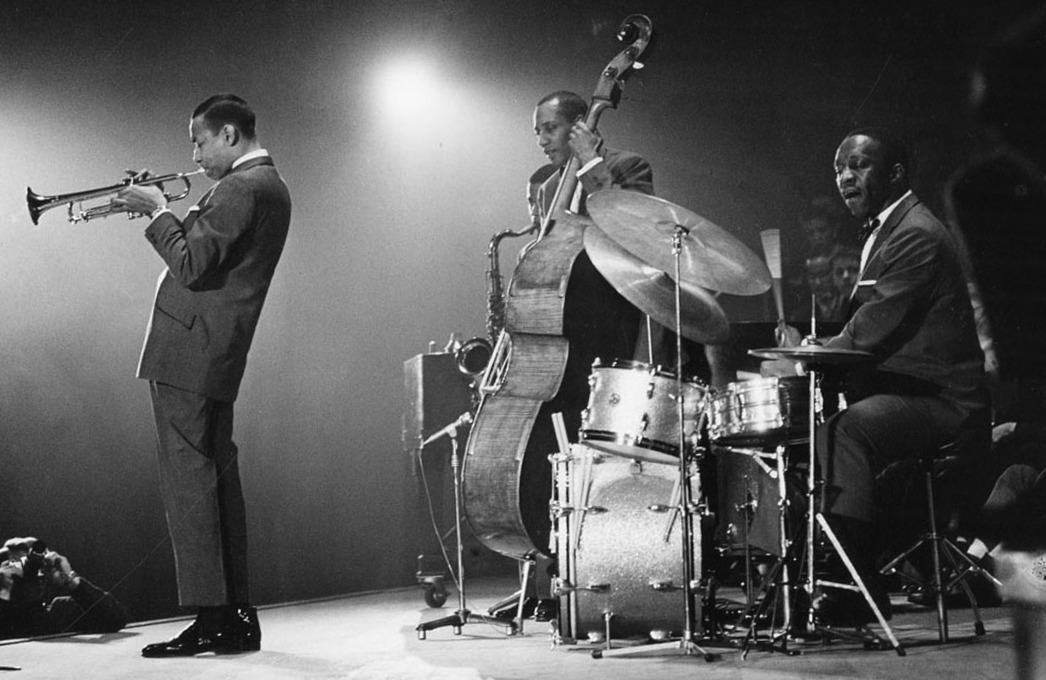
- The Jazz Messengers in 1960. From left: Lee Morgan, Wayne Shorter (obscured), Jymie Merritt, and Art Blakey

Background information
- Genres: Jazz; hard bop; bebop
- Years active: 1955–1990
- Labels: A&M; Atlantic; Bethlehem; Soul Note; Blue Note; Cadet; Catalyst; Colpix; Columbia; Concord Jazz; Amigo; Delos; Elektra; Fontana; Impulse!; Jubilee; Limelight; Pacific Jazz; Palcoscenico; Philips; Prestige; Vik; Riverside; Roulette; Sonet; Timeless; United Artists
- Past members: See Former members

The Jazz Messengers were a jazz combo which existed for over thirty-five years beginning in the early 1950s as a collective, and only ended when long-time leader and founding drummer Art Blakey died in 1990. Blakey led or co-led the group from the outset. "Art Blakey" and "Jazz Messengers" became synonymous over the years, though Blakey did lead non-Messenger recording sessions and played as a sideman for other groups throughout his career.

"Yes sir, I'm gonna to stay with the youngsters. When these get too old, I'm gonna get some younger ones. Keeps the mind active."

— Art Blakey, A Night at Birdland, Vol. 2 (CD)

The group evolved into a proving ground for young jazz talent. While veterans occasionally re-appeared in the group, by and large, each iteration of the Messengers included a lineup of new young players. Having the Messengers on one's resume was a rite of passage in the jazz world, and conveyed immediate bona fides.

Many former members of the Jazz Messengers established careers as solo musicians, such as Lee Morgan, Benny Golson, Wayne Shorter, Freddie Hubbard, Bobby Timmons, Hank Mobley, Curtis Fuller, Cedar Walton, Gary Bartz, Billy Harper, Keith Jarrett, Joanne Brackeen, Woody Shaw, Chuck Mangione, Wynton Marsalis, Branford Marsalis, Terence Blanchard, Donald Harrison and Mulgrew Miller. Some members, such as bassist Clarence Seay and Gregory Charles Royal, are documented to have played in the Jazz Messengers but did not record with the group.

== History ==
=== Origins ===
On December 17, 1947, Blakey led a group known as "Art Blakey's Messengers" in his first recording session as a leader, for Blue Note Records. The records were released as 78s at the time and two of the songs were released on the New Sounds 10" LP compilation (BLP 5010). This octet included Kenny Dorham, Howard Bowe, Sahib Shihab, Musa Kaleem, Ernest Thompson, Walter Bishop Jr., and LaVerne Barker.

Around the same time—in 1947 or 1949—Blakey led a big band called "Seventeen Messengers." The band proved to be financially unstable and broke up soon after. The Messengers name then went dormant for several years.

Blakey and Horace Silver began working together in the early 1950s. Some cite the group that included Blakey, Silver, Kenny Dorham, Lou Donaldson and Gene Ramey in 1953 as the original Jazz Messengers. On February 21, 1954, a group billed as the "Art Blakey Quintet" produced the live set of records called A Night at Birdland. The quintet included Horace Silver, Clifford Brown, Lou Donaldson and Curly Russell. These records were quite successful, and some cite this date as the beginning of the Jazz Messengers.

=== The Jazz Messengers (1954–56) ===
Most date the origin of the Jazz Messengers to 1954, or 1955, when the first recordings credited to the band appeared. The Jazz Messengers formed as a collective, nominally led by Silver or Blakey on various dates. Blakey credits Silver with reviving the Messengers name for the group. The other members included Kenny Dorham, Hank Mobley and Doug Watkins. Their first recordings officially using the Jazz Messengers name were a pair of live dates, recorded at the Café Bohemia in 1955. A pair of earlier recordings from sessions in late 1954 and early 1955—released on Blue Note 10" LPs as the Horace Silver Quintet, vol. 1 and vol. 2—were subsequently reissued as a 12" LP entitled Horace Silver and the Jazz Messengers.

The pioneering members of the Jazz Messengers (Horace Silver, Hank Mobley, Kenny Dorham, Doug Watkins, and of course Blakey) believed that the band needed a professional look, and they abandoned jam sessions.

In 1956 Dorham left the band to go out on his own and was replaced by Donald Byrd. This group released The Jazz Messengers on Columbia Records. Later in the year, the original group disbanded, but Blakey retained the Jazz Messengers name for his future groups.

=== The "Second" Messengers (1956–58) ===
For a brief period in 1956 Donald Byrd stayed on as a new lineup was formed. It included Kenny Drew, Wilbur Ware, and Ira Sullivan playing tenor sax rather than his main instrument, trumpet. The only recording of this version of the Messengers was two tracks backing up singer Rita Reys on The Cool Voice of Rita Reys on Columbia.

Blakey then formed a new lineup that would prove to be much more stable. The most notable name, at the time, was Jackie McLean. He was only 25, but had already recorded with Miles Davis and Charles Mingus. Bill Hardman, Sam Dockery and Jimmy "Spanky" DeBrest complete the group.

They recorded another record for Columbia: Hard Bop—still under the collective's moniker The Jazz Messengers. They went on to record for several different labels including RCA subsidiary Vik Records, Pacific Jazz, Elektra, Cadet, Jubilee, Bethlehem and a date on Atlantic featuring Thelonious Monk. Over this time the band's name evolved to include Blakey's name, starting with "The Jazz Messengers, featuring Art Blakey" on Ritual, then "Art Blakey's Jazz Messengers" on several records, and also "Art Blakey and his Jazz Messengers" on Cu-Bop.

=== Art Blakey and the Jazz Messengers (1959–64) ===
In 1958, Blakey formed a new lineup with four Philadelphia natives: Lee Morgan, Benny Golson, Bobby Timmons, and Jymie Merritt. This marked the beginning of perhaps the most fruitful period of the Jazz Messengers. They returned to Blue Note and the first record—entitled simply Art Blakey and the Jazz Messengers—produced their biggest hit: "Moanin'". (Note: The album is commonly called Moanin, and reissues used that title.) It featured two more songs which would become Messengers classics, and jazz classics as well: "Blues March" and "Along Came Betty" by Benny Golson.

Golson left the band in 1959 after a European tour (which produced live albums and a film soundtrack on Fontana Records and French RCA) to be replaced, briefly, by Hank Mobley. Mobley did not accompany the band to a Canadian jazz festival in 1959; Lee Morgan encountered Wayne Shorter at the festival, and he joined the band in Mobley's place. This lineup produced several notable recordings, including the second Messenger album, A Night in Tunisia.

In 1961 the group expanded to a sextet with the addition of Curtis Fuller. This lineup produced a self-titled album for Impulse! Records. At the end of that summer, Lee Morgan and Bobby Timmons left and were replaced by Freddie Hubbard and Cedar Walton respectively. This lineup recorded Three Blind Mice for United Artists and two albums for Blue Note: Mosaic and Buhaina's Delight.

In mid-1962 Reggie Workman replaced long-time double bassist Jymie Merritt, who wanted to settle down in Philadelphia. This version of the group produced three albums for Riverside: Caravan, Ugetsu, and Kyoto; in addition to another Blue Note under the name Free for All. This lineup stayed together until March 1964, when Lee Morgan rejoined in place of Freddie Hubbard. Around this time—the recording date is unknown—the band produced an album from the musical Golden Boy for the Colpix label with an expanded lineup. This lineup included both Freddie Hubbard and Lee Morgan on trumpet, plus James Spaulding, Charles Davis, Julius Watkins, and Bill Barber.

In April 1964, the Jazz Messengers produced their final, new, recording for the Blue Note label: Indestructible.

=== The "New" Messengers (1964–66) ===
In September 1964, Wayne Shorter left the Messengers to join the Miles Davis band that was later called the Second Great Quintet. Lee Morgan enlisted long-time Sun Ra tenor saxophonist John Gilmore to fill in—though it was understood he would return to Sun Ra after a time. Gilmore brought along fellow Arkestra member Victor Sproles and John Hicks joined on piano. The edition of the Messengers would see more quick turnover of members than the previous.

The band signed with Quincy Jones' new Mercury sub-label Limelight Records. This group—still including Curtis Fuller on trombone—recorded the first album for the label: 'S Make It. The band soon reverted to a quintet as Fuller departed. Alto saxophonist Gary Bartz replaced the departing John Gilmore and this quintet—with Freddie Hubbard sitting in alongside Morgan—recorded Soul Finger for Limelight.

By January 1966, the band had completely turned over again. Now Chuck Mangione occupied the trumpet chair with Frank Mitchell on tenor sax, Keith Jarrett on piano and Reggie Johnson on bass. This lineup produced the live album Buttercorn Lady under the moniker Art Blakey and the "New" Jazz Messengers. While the band continued to perform live, this would be the final Jazz Messengers recording of the decade. (Note: Blakey would produce one more, non-Messengers, album for the Limelight label in 1966: Hold On, I'm Coming (album).)

=== The Fallow Decade (1966–76) ===
The late 1960s saw the ascendance of rock music in popular culture, and the jazz world was experimenting with free jazz and jazz fusion, styles Blakey did not care for. It was difficult for Blakey to maintain a steady lineup for the Messengers, during this period, and even more difficult to produce recordings. Between 1966 and 1972, the Messengers produced only a single official record: Jazz Messengers '70, a live date in Tokyo. This particular lineup included Bill Hardman, Carlos Garnett, Joanne Brackeen and Jan Arnet.

Blakey kept the Messengers working during this period—particularly abroad in Europe and Japan where they maintained their popularity. But the lineups were fluid, with several musicians rotating through based on who was available for the particular engagement. In various combinations, between 1966 and 1972 the band included trumpet players Woody Shaw and Randy Brecker (Note: While Brecker's tenure is confirmed by multiple sources, it must have been quite short; likely a few months in 1969.) in addition to Hardman; saxophonists Garnett, Mitchell, Billy Harper and Ramon Morris; and trombonists Slide Hampton and Julian Priester. The piano chair saw the greatest turnover. After Jarrett, pianists included Mike Nock, Lonnie Liston Smith, Chick Corea, McCoy Tyner, Ronnie Mathews, George Cables, Joanne Brackeen, Albert Dailey, plus occasionally veterans John Hicks, Cedar Walton, and Walter Davis Jr. Bassists included Juni Booth, Buster Williams, Larry Evans, Scotty Holt, Arnet, and Mickey Bass.

In 1972 the Messengers were signed to Prestige Records and produced three albums. Child's Dance featured pieces from two recording sessions on 1972, with different, expanded, and somewhat overlapping lineups. The regular Messengers on the album were Woody Shaw; Ramon Morris; John Hicks, Walter Davis Jr. and George Cables on both acoustic and electric pianos; and Mickey Bass. The band was augmented by Buddy Terry (soprano sax), Manny Boyd (flute), Michael Howard (guitar), Stanley Clarke (electric bass), and percussionists Nathaniel Bettis, Sonny Morgan, Pablo Landrum, Emmanuel Rahim and Ray Mantilla for different tunes across the two sessions.

In 1973, a regular lineup of Woody Shaw, newcomer Carter Jefferson, Cedar Walton, and Mickey Bass recorded two more Prestige albums: Anthenagin and Buhaina. Conga player Tony Waters appears on Anthenagin and trombonist Steve Turre appears on Buhaina.

Blakey struggled to keep the band going the next three years. Only one recording—a 1975 collaboration with Sonny Stitt called In Walked Sonny on the Swedish Sonet label—was produced between 1973 and 1976. That album included long time trumpet stalwart Bill Hardman again occupying the trumpet chair. David Schnitter was now on tenor sax and would stay with the Messengers for some time to come. Walter Davis Jr. was back on piano, and the new bassist was Isao Suzuki. The Messengers were still popular in Japan, and travelled there annually. Hardman and Schnitter were constants throughout this period. Pianists also included Albert Dailey and Mickey Tucker and bassists after Suzuki included Cameron Brown and Chris Amberger.

=== Messengers rejuvenation (1976–90) ===
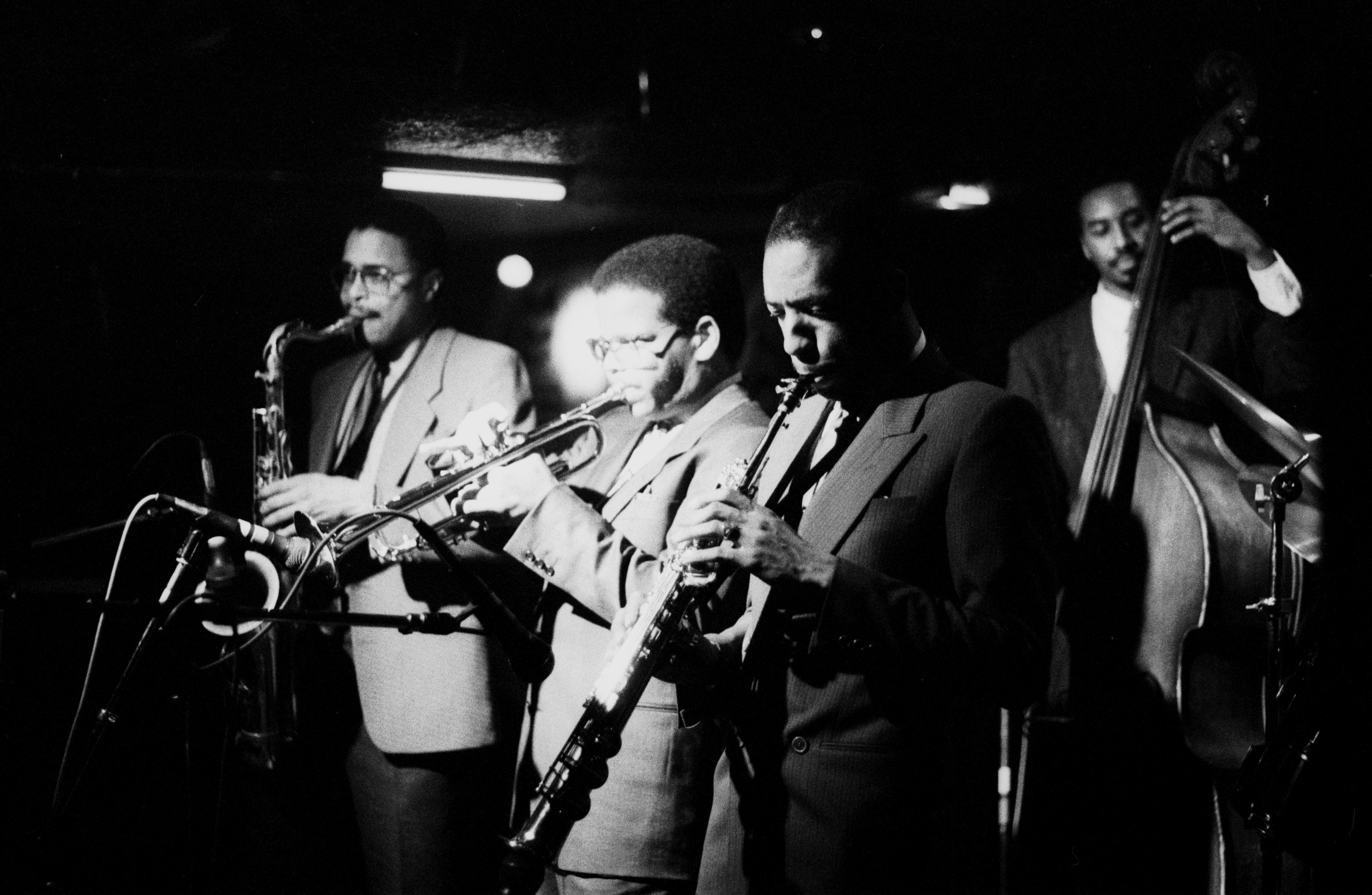
In 1985.

In 1976, the Messengers recorded a record for Roulette – Backgammon—featuring Hardman, Schnitter, Dailey and Suzuki. In that year Blakey began a professional relationship with Wim Wigt, a Dutch music booker and owner of the Timeless label. Wigt booked the Messengers throughout Europe. A second record for Roulette followed, featuring Schnitter, Walter Davis Jr. and newcomers Valery Ponomarev, Bobby Watson, and Dennis Irwin. From this point the lineups began to stabilize as the band worked more regularly.

In October 1977, Blakey hired a new, regular, pianist: James Williams. This group (Ponomarev, Watson, Schnitter, Willams and Irwin) recorded In My Prime Vol. 1 in November 1977 for Wigt's Timeless label. In 1978 they recorded In This Korner for Concord Jazz and In My Prime Vol. 2 and Reflections in Blue for Timeless. In February 1979, they recorded the third Messengers album entitled Night in Tunisia for Philips. In November 1979 they recorded One by One, a live album in Italy, for the Italian Palcoscenico label.

In 1979, Blakey decided to assemble an 11-piece "big band" to take on a European tour in 1980. This band was unique in that it included two sets of brothers: Wynton and Branford Marsalis and Robin and Kevin Eubanks, and that the group had the first guitarist that Blakey ever hired, Bobby Broom. The young musicians were cultivated by playing in the smaller Jazz Messengers combo around New York City through 1979. Broom left the group before the 1980 tour. These would be Ponomarev's last appearances with the Messengers. While Watson and Williams continued with the Messengers, David Schnitter was replaced by Bill Pierce and Dennis Irwin was replaced by Charles Fambrough. This band also featured a second drummer: John Ramsay. Live at Montreux and Northsea by the Jazz Messengers Big Band was recorded at the Northsea and Montreux Jazz Festivals by Timeless.

The regular working sextet that emerged from this European tour now included Wynton Marsalis, Bobby Watson, Bill Pierce, James Williams and Charles Fambrough. This group produced Art Blakey in Sweden on the Amigo label, Album of the Year on Timeless and Straight Ahead on the Concord Jazz imprint—all in early 1981.

When Branford Marsalis graduated from the Berklee College of Music in 1981, he joined his brother in place of Bobby Watson. Donald Brown replaced James Williams at this time as well. (Note: Wallace Roney filled in on trumpet while Wynton Marsalis took a leave of absence in the summer of 1981.) In January 1982 this lineup produced Keystone 3, the third live album recorded by the band at Keystone Korner in San Francisco.

Wynton Marsalis' star was rising quickly. He and his brother Branford left to form their own band in early 1982. Due to Donald Brown's struggles with arthritis, he left the band at this time as well. The new lineup was Terence Blanchard and Donald Harrison on the front line, and Johnny O'Neal on piano, joining Pierce and Fambrough. This lineup recorded Oh-By the Way for Timeless in 1982. The band turned over gradually over the next year. Pierce left to begin teaching at Berklee in September 1982. He was replaced by Jean Toussaint. Fambrough left in mid-1983 to be replaced by Lonnie Plaxico. And Mulgrew Miller took over for Johnny O'Neal in 1984.

This new lineup – Blanchard, Donald Harrison, Toussaint, Miller, and Plaxico—stayed together throughout 1985, into 1986. They recorded New York Scene in 1984 and Live at Kimball's in 1985, both for Concord Jazz. A live date from Ronnie Scott's in London also appeared.

Blanchard and Harrison formed their own band in mid-1986. They were replaced by Wallace Roney and Kenny Garrett, respectively. Tim Williams was also added on trombone. This group recorded the Feeling Good album for Delos.

By the end of 1987 the band had turned over once again. Philip Harper was the new trumpet player, Javon Jackson joined on tenor, and Robin Eubanks returned on trombone. The new pianist was Benny Green and Peter Washington was the bassist. This lineup recorded Not Yet and I Get a Kick Out of Bu (with Leon Dorsey replacing Washington on bass), both for Soul Note in 1988.

In 1989, what became the final Jazz Messengers lineup was established: Brian Lynch on trumpet, Javon Jackson and Dale Barlow on tenors, Steve Davis and/or Frank Lacy on trombone, Geoff Keezer on piano and Essiet Okon Essiet on bass. This final group recorded the final Messengers album, One for All (1990), on A&M Records. In October 1989, the group played a special concert at the Leverkusen Jazz Festival in Germany to celebrate Blakey's 70th birthday with many invited guests, including Freddie Hubbard, Terence Blanchard, Donald Harrison, Jackie McLean, Wayne Shorter, Benny Golson, Curtis Fuller, Walter Davis Jr., Buster Williams and Roy Haynes, with Michele Hendricks singing a song composed for the occasion by Horace Silver.

== Discography ==
- The Jazz Messengers Discography by Jimita
- The Jazz Messengers Discography by Jimita (mirror)

== Former members ==
- Dale Barlow
- Gary Bartz
- Mickey Bass
- Art Blakey
- Terence Blanchard
- Joanne Brackeen
- Randy Brecker
- Cameron Brown
- Donald Brown
- Bobby Broom
- Donald Byrd
- George Cables
- Buck Clarke
- Chick Corea
- Steve Davis
- Walter Davis Jr.
- Spanky DeBrest
- Sam Dockery
- Kenny Dorham
- Robin Eubanks
- Charles Fambrough
- Curtis Fuller
- Carlos Garnett
- Kenny Garrett
- John Gilmore
- Benny Golson
- Benny Green
- Johnny Griffin
- Bill Hardman
- Donald Harrison
- Billy Harper
- Philip Harper
- John Hicks
- Freddie Hubbard
- Dennis Irwin
- Javon Jackson
- Keith Jarrett
- Carter Jefferson
- Geoffrey Keezer
- Frank Lacy
- Brian Lynch
- Chuck Mangione
- Wynton Marsalis
- Branford Marsalis
- Jackie McLean
- Jymie Merritt
- Mulgrew Miller
- Frank Mitchell
- Hank Mobley
- Lee Morgan
- Mike Nock
- Johnny O'Neal
- Essiet Okon Essiet
- Billy Pierce
- Lonnie Plaxico
- Valery Ponomarev
- Wallace Roney
- Gregory Charles Royal
- David Schnitter
- Woody Shaw
- Clarence Seay
- Wayne Shorter
- Horace Silver
- Victor Sproles
- Bobby Timmons
- Jean Toussaint
- McCoy Tyner
- Cedar Walton
- Peter Washington
- Doug Watkins
- Bobby Watson
- James Williams
- Reggie Workman

Jazz Messengers Timeline
