= Soul Finger (Art Blakey album) =

Studio album by Art Blakey and the Jazz Messengers
- Released: End of August 1965
- Recorded: May 12–13, 1965; New York City
- Genre: Jazz
- Length: 36:42
- Label: Limelight; LM 82018
- Producer: Jack Tracy

Art Blakey and the Jazz Messengers chronology
'S Make It (1964)	Soul Finger (1965)	Buttercorn Lady (1966)

Soul Finger is an album by drummer Art Blakey recorded in 1965 and originally released on the Limelight label. On the 2009 CD edition, Gary Bartz, whose recording debut this was, was left off the credits - he is the saxophonist (alto) for five of the six cuts. Lucky Thompson is on only one cut, playing soprano sax on "Spot Session" with the quartet of Blakey, Hicks and Sproles. A sixth cut from the Bartz sessions was used on the later Hold On, I'm Coming album. This was trumpeter Lee Morgan's last recording with Art Blakey after a seven-year association; Freddie Hubbard would return to tour with Blakey's group again in the 1980s.

== Reception ==
Professional ratings
Review scores
Source	Rating
Allmusic	3.5/5 stars
DownBeat	4/5 stars

Allmusic awarded the album 3½ stars stating "The program here showcases the sounds of a band in transition to be sure, but also the sound of a group with nothing to lose; in other words, plenty of chances get taken that might not otherwise fly... this date is well worth seeking out for fans of Blakey's long running, ever evolving unit".

== Track listing ==
1. "Soul Finger" (Freddie Hubbard, Lee Morgan) - 3:17
2. "Buh's Bossa" (Morgan) - 5:33
3. "Spot Session" (Lucky Thompson) - 7:21
4. "Freedom Monday" (Art Blakey) - 6:15
5. "A Quiet Thing" (Fred Ebb, John Kander) - 6:56
6. "The Hub" (Hubbard) - 7:20

== Personnel ==
- Art Blakey - drums
- Freddie Hubbard, Lee Morgan - trumpet (except on "Spot Session")
- Gary Bartz - alto saxophone (except on "Spot Session")
- Lucky Thompson - soprano sax (on "Spot Session")
- John Hicks - piano
- Victor Sproles - bass
