= In My Prime Vol. 2 =

Studio album by Art Blakey and the Jazz Messengers
- Released: 1978
- Recorded: December 30, 1977; CI Recording Studios, New York City
- Genre: Jazz
- Labels: Timeless; SJP 118
- Producer: Wim Wigt

Art Blakey and the Jazz Messengers chronology
In My Prime Vol. 1 (1977)	In My Prime Vol. 2 (1978)	In This Korner (1978)

In My Prime Vol. 2 is an album by drummer Art Blakey and the Jazz Messengers recorded in 1977 and released on the Dutch Timeless label.

== Reception ==
Professional ratings
Review scores
Source	Rating
Allmusic	3/5 stars

Allmusic awarded the album 3 stars stating that "Despite the changes in musical fashions, Art Blakey and his hard-bop institution were still turning out new material and solos in the late '70s that sound fresh and alive today".

== Track listing ==
All compositions by Robert Watson except as indicated

1. "Hawkman" - 9:25
2. "People Who Laugh" (Slide Hampton) - 6:15
3. "Time Will Tell" - 9:26
4. "Ronnie's a Dynamite Lady" (Walter Davis, Jr.) - 8:10

== Personnel ==
- Art Blakey - drums
- Valery Ponomarev - trumpet
- Curtis Fuller - trombone
- Robert Watson - alto saxophone
- David Schnitter - tenor saxophone
- James Williams - piano
- Dennis Irwin - bass
- Ray Mantilla - percussion
