= Black Pearl (Harrison/Blanchard album) =

Studio album by Harrison/Blanchard
- Released: 1988
- Genre: Jazz
- Label: Columbia
- Producer: George Petit

Harrison/Blanchard chronology
Crystal Stair (1987)	Black Pearl (1988)

Black Pearl is an album by the American jazz duo Harrison/Blanchard, released in 1988. It was their final album together; Terence Blanchard began his long partnership with the director Spike Lee on School Daze, released the same year. The duo supported the album with a North American tour.

== Production ==
The album was produced by George Petit. Donald Harrison and Blanchard were backed by Carl Allen on drums, Reginald Veal on bass, and Cyrus Chestnut on piano. Mark Whitfield played guitar on "Infinite Heart". Harrison played a C melody saxophone on some of the songs. "Somewhere" is an interpretation of Leonard Bernstein's composition. "Selim Sivad" is a paean to Miles Davis.

== Critical reception ==
Professional ratings
Review scores
Source	Rating
AllMusic	4/5 stars
The Encyclopedia of Popular Music	4/5 stars
MusicHound Jazz: The Essential Album Guide	3.5/5 stars
The Philadelphia Inquirer	3/4 stars
The Windsor Star	C

The Washington Post noted that "the mood is generally dark, somber and understated—even 'Ninth Ward Strut', the third tune on the album and the first to really emphasize a beat, keeps the rhythms tightly contained." The Globe and Mail said that the duo's "tunes are flirtatious, full of ambiguities and open ends; their solos are as often wistfully evasive as they are punchy and to the point." The Ottawa Citizen stated that the "solid, post-bop improvising shows the duo's ability to move outside conventions and to compose well structured pieces."

The Windsor Star concluded that "the title cut has a haunting quality, quietly suspenseful, but some tunes are blandly vamp-like." The Buffalo News opined that "there is something curiously abstract, theoretical and even tentative about the record". The Commercial Appeal praised "Blanchard's finest recorded trumpet solos". The New York Daily News opined that the duo "prove that recreating bop-era jazz needn't result in wax-museum-like records like those of Wynton Marsalis." The Pittsburgh Press and The Edmonton Journal included Black Pearl on their lists of the 10 best jazz albums of 1988.

== Track listing ==
No.	Title	Length
1.	"Selim Sivad"
2.	"Black Pearl"
3.	"Ninth Ward Strut"
4.	"Infinite Heart"
5.	"The Center Piece"
6.	"Somewhere"
7.	"Dizzy Gillespie's Hands"
8.	"Toni"
9.	"Birth of the Abstract"
