= Valery Ponomarev =

Russian jazz trumpeter

Valery Ponomarev, Russian: Вале́рий Миха́йлович Пономарёв, Valery Mikhaylovich Ponomaryov, (born 20 January 1943) is a Russian-born jazz trumpeter. He has lived in the United States since 1973.

Ponomarev became interested in jazz after hearing it on Voice of America, and felt a particular affinity for Clifford Brown. He dedicated countless hours to transcribing, studying and memorizing legendary jazz trumpet solos. In time he decided to flee the then Soviet Union and ended up joining Art Blakey's group the Jazz Messengers. After leaving, he formed his own band, Universal Language.

On September 9, 2006, his arm was broken in an altercation with security at Charles de Gaulle Airport. The altercation involved his intention of carrying his trumpet with him onto the plane.

Ponomarev tours with his tribute big band, playing both originals and music from the Art Blakey and the Jazz Messengers repertoire. He teaches privately, and released his autobiography On the Flip Side of Sound in 2009. He teaches as part of the Wells Fargo Jazz for Teens program in Newark, New Jersey.

== Discography ==
=== As leader ===
- Beyond the Obvious – with Don Braden, Martin Zenker and Jerome Jennings, (Reservoir 2006)
- The Messenger – with Michael Karn, Sid Simmons, Martin Zenker and Jimmy Cobb, (Reservoir, 2001)
- A Star for You – with Bob Berg, Sid Simmons, Ken Walker, and Billy Hart, (Reservoir, 1997)
- Live at Vartan Jazz – with Francesco Bearzatti, Sid Simmons, Kenny Walker and Ben Riley, (Vartan Jazz 1995)
- Live at Sweet Basil – with John Hicks, Peter Washington, Don Braden and, Victor Jones, (Reservoir, 1993)
- Profile – with Joe Henderson, Kenny Barron, Essiet Essiet and Victor Jones, (Reservoir, 1991)
- Trip to Moscow – Universal Language, (Reservoir, 1988)
- Means of Identification – with Ralph Moore, Hideki Takao, Dennis Irwin, and Kenny Washington, (Reservoir, 1987)

=== As sideman ===
With Art Blakey

- Gypsy Folk Tales (Roulette, 1977)
- Heat Wave (M&I, 1977)
- In My Prime Vol. 1 (Timeless, 1977)
- In My Prime Vol. 2 (Timeless, 1977)
- In This Korner (Concord Jazz, 1978)
- Reflections in Blue (Timeless, 1978)
- Night in Tunisia: Digital Recording (Philips, 1979)
- One by One (Palcoscenico, 1979 [1981])
- Live at Montreux and Northsea (Timeless, 1980)

With Junior Cook

- You Leave Me Breathless (SteepleChase, 1991)

With Charles McPherson

- Live at Vartan Jazz (Vartan Jazz, 1997)

Reflections In Blue // Recorded At Fendal Sound Recording Studios Loenen Aan De Vecht, Holland, December 4, 1978
