= One by One (Art Blakey album) =

Live album by Art Blakey and the Jazz Messengers
- Released: 1981
- Recorded: November 4, 1979; Milan, Italy
- Genre: Jazz
- Label: Palcoscenico; PAL 15005

Art Blakey and the Jazz Messengers chronology
Night in Tunisia: Digital Recording (1979)	One by One (1981)	Live at Montreux and Northsea (1980)

One by One is an album by drummer Art Blakey and the Jazz Messengers recorded in 1979 in Italy and released on the Italian Palcoscenico label.

== Reception ==
Professional ratings
Review scores
Source	Rating
Allmusic	3/5 stars

Allmusic awarded the album 3 stars.

== Track listing ==
1. "Gershwin Medley: Rhapsody in Blue/Summertime/It Ain't Necessarily So/Someone to Watch Over Me/The Man I Love" (George Gershwin) - 8:55
2. "The Song Is You" (Oscar Hammerstein II, Jerome Kern) - 10:30
3. "One by One" (Wayne Shorter) - 9:40
4. "Moanin'" (Bobby Timmons) - 10:50

== Personnel ==
- Art Blakey - drums
- Valery Ponomarev - trumpet
- Bobby Watson - alto saxophone
- David Schnitter - tenor saxophone
- James Williams - piano
- Dennis Irwin - bass
