= Backgammon (album) =

Studio album by Art Blakey and the Jazz Messengers
- Released: 1976
- Recorded: March 15 & 16, 1976; New York City
- Genre: Jazz
- Label: Roulette; SR 5003
- Producer: Fred Bailin

Art Blakey and the Jazz Messengers chronology
In Walked Sonny (1975)	Backgammon (1976)	Gypsy Folk Tales (1976)

Backgammon (also released as Blues March) is an album by drummer Art Blakey and The Jazz Messengers recorded in 1976 and released on the Roulette label.

== Reception ==
Professional ratings
Review scores
Source	Rating
Allmusic	2.5/5 stars
The Rolling Stone Jazz Record Guide	2/5 stars

Allmusic awarded the album 2½ stars.

== Track listing ==
1. "Uranus" (Walter Davis) – 6:55
2. "Whisper Not" (Benny Golson) – 6:30
3. "Backgammon" (Davis) – 5:25
4. "Blues March" (Golson) – 5:27
5. "Georgia on My Mind" (Hoagy Carmichael, Stuart Gorrell) – 5:13
6. "Third World Express" (Kasa Allah) – 7:47
7. "Namfulay" (Ladji Camara) – 4:02
8. "I Can't Get Started" (Ira Gershwin, Vernon Duke) – 6:47

== Personnel ==
- Art Blakey – drums
- Bill Hardman – trumpet
- Ladji Camara – flute, vocals (track 7)
- David Schnitter – tenor saxophone
- Albert Dailey – piano
- Chin Suzuki – bass
