= Blue Night (Art Blakey album) =

Studio album by Art Blakey and The Jazz Messengers
- Released: 1985
- Recorded: March 17, 1985; Studio 44, Monster, Netherlands
- Genre: Jazz
- Length: 43:05
- Label: Timeless; SJP 217
- Producer: Wim Wigt

Art Blakey chronology
Art Blakey and the Jazz Messengers Live at Ronnie Scotts (1984)	Blue Night (1985)	Farewell (1985)

Blue Night is an album by drummer Art Blakey and The Jazz Messengers recorded in 1985 in the Netherlands and released on the Dutch Timeless label. It is not to be confused with the 1994 album of the same name released by Percy Sledge.

== Reception ==
Professional ratings
Review scores
Source	Rating
Allmusic	2.5/5 stars

Scott Yanow of Allmusic stated "This excellent Timeless CD has a version of "Body and Soul" along with seven stimulating (if not overly memorable) recent originals by bandmembers. Fine modern hard bop".

== Track listing ==
1. "Two of a Kind" (Terence Blanchard) - 9:52
2. "Blue Minor" (Jean Toussaint) - 11:27
3. "Blue Night" (Lonnie Plaxico) - 7:25
4. "Body and Soul" (Frank Eyton, Johnny Green, Edward Heyman, Robert Sour) - 7:26
5. "Mr. Combinated" (Donald Harrison) - 6:39
6. "Two of a Kind" [alternate take] (Blanchard) - 9:22 Bonus track on CD reissue
7. "Blue Minor" [alternate take] (Toussaint) - 8:51 Bonus track on CD reissue
8. "Mr. Combinated" [alternate take] (Harrison) - 6:50 Bonus track on CD reissue

== Personnel ==
- Art Blakey - drums
- Terence Blanchard - trumpet
- Donald Harrison - alto saxophone
- Jean Toussaint - tenor saxophone
- Mulgrew Miller - piano
- Lonnie Plaxico - bass
