= Feeling Good (Art Blakey album) =

Studio album by Art Blakey and the Jazz Messengers
- Released: 1986
- Recorded: September 8–9, 1986
- Studio: Fantasy Studios, Berkeley, California
- Genre: Jazz
- Length: 70:46
- Label: Delos; D/CD 4007
- Producer: Orrin Keepnews, Amelia S. Haygood & Lupe De Leon

Art Blakey and the Jazz Messengers chronology
Live at Kimball's (1985)	Feeling Good (1986)	Not Yet (1988)

Feeling Good is an album by drummer Art Blakey and the Jazz Messengers recorded in California in 1986 and released on the Delos label.

== Reception ==
Professional ratings
Review scores
Source	Rating
Allmusic	2.5/5 stars
Houston Chronicle	4/5 stars
Newark Star-Ledger	

Scott Yanow of Allmusic stated "The repertoire includes both new originals and a few Messenger standbys; the music is consistently enjoyable".

== Track listing ==
1. "On the Ginza" (Wayne Shorter) - 8:54
2. "Feeling Good" (Kenny Garrett) - 8:16
3. "Minor's Holiday" (Kenny Dorham) - 6:45
4. "Second Thoughts" (Mulgrew Miller) - 7:43
5. "Caravan" (Duke Ellington, Irving Mills, Juan Tizol) - 13:43
6. "Crooked Smile" (Jean Toussaint) - 8:10
7. "One by One" (Shorter) - 10:10
8. "Obsession" (Wallace Roney) - 7:04

== Personnel ==
- Art Blakey - drums
- Wallace Roney - trumpet
- Tim Williams - trombone
- Kenny Garrett - alto saxophone
- Jean Toussaint - tenor saxophone
- Donald Brown - piano
- Peter Washington - bass
