= David Schnitter =

American jazz saxophonist

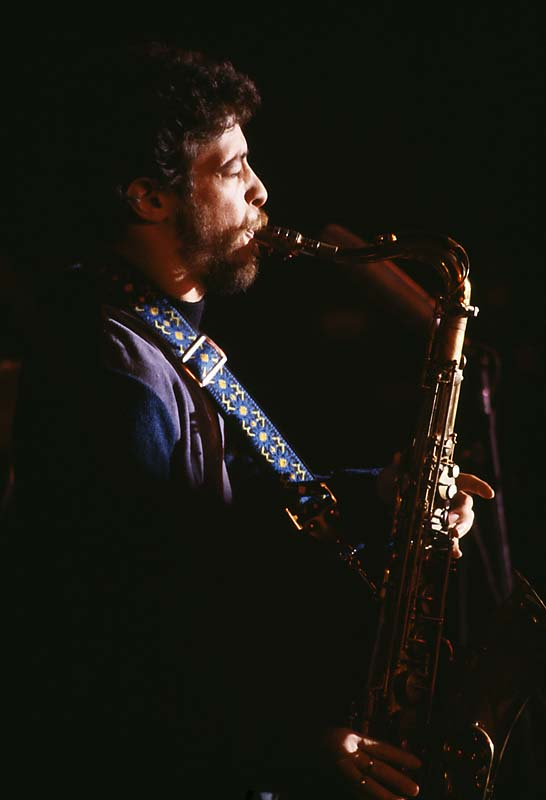
- David Schnitter and the Jazz Messengers, Swedish Umeå Jazz Festival, 1979

Background information
- Born: March 19, 1948 (age 78); Newark, New Jersey, U.S.
- Genre: Jazz
- Occupation: Musician
- Instrument: Tenor saxophone
- Labels: Muse, CIMP

David Schnitter (born March 19, 1948, in Newark, New Jersey) is an American jazz tenor saxophonist most known for his tenure with Art Blakey and his Jazz Messengers from 1974 to 1979 and with Freddie Hubbard from 1979 to 1981.

Born in Newark, New Jersey Schnitter played clarinet as a youth before switching to tenor sax at age 15. He studied with Joseph Allard before earning a BA at Rutgers University. After moving to New York City he played with Ted Dunbar before becoming a member of Art Blakey's Jazz Messengers from 1974 to 1979 which has been his most notable association. Schnitter brought the hard bop saxophone style, influenced by Dexter Gordon and Sonny Stitt, back to the Jazz Messengers after years of them mostly playing modal jazz. Schnitter eventually played with Sonny Stitt on the album In Walked Sonny when Stitt recorded with Art Blakey. While still a Jazz Messenger, Schnitter also recorded four albums as a leader for Muse Records from 1976 to 1981. After leaving the Jazz Messengers, he played with Freddie Hubbard from 1979 to 1981 and also worked with Frank Foster, Charles Earland and Groove Holmes. He moved to Spain in 1981 and kept a low profile. After returning to New York in 1990, he has mostly focused on teaching. He has been on the faculty at the New School for Jazz and Contemporary Music since 1994. In the 2000s, he has performed more regularly at Smalls Jazz Club and Fat Cat in Manhattan in addition to touring Europe.

== Discography ==
=== As Leader ===
- Invitation (Muse, 1976)
- Goliath (Muse, 1977)
- Thundering (Muse, 1978)
- Glowing (Muse, 1981)
- Sketch (Omix, 2004)
- The Spirit of Things (CIMP, 2008)
- Nursery Rhymes for the 21st Century (Cimp, 2010)
- Live at Smalls (smallsLIVE, 2012)
- Two For The Road (Fresh Sound, 2023) – rec. 2019

=== As sideman ===
With Art Blakey

- Backgammon (Roulette, 1976)
- Gypsy Folk Tales (Roulette, 1977)
- In My Prime Vol. 1 (Timeless, 1977)
- In My Prime Vol. 2 (Timeless, 1977)
- In This Korner (Concord Jazz, 1978)
- Reflections in Blue (Timeless, 1978)
- Night in Tunisia: Digital Recording (Philips, 1979)
- One by One (Palcoscenico, 1981) – rec. 1979

With others

- Richard "Groove" Holmes, Shippin' Out (Muse, 1978)
- Johnny Lytle, Everything Must Change (Muse, 1977)
- Red Rodney, Home Free (Muse, 1979) – rec. 1977
