= Charles Fambrough =

American jazz bassist, composer and producer

- Born: August 25, 1950; Philadelphia, Pennsylvania, U.S.
- Died: January 1, 2011 (aged 60)
- Genre: Jazz
- Occupations: Musician; composer; record producer
- Instrument: Bass
- Years active: 1960s–2011
- Labels: CTI; Evidence; AudioQuest; Jazz Lions; NuGroove; Random Chance; LightYear
- Formerly of: Grover Washington Jr.; Airto Moreira; McCoy Tyner; The Jazz Messengers; Wynton Marsalis

Charles Fambrough (August 25, 1950 – January 1, 2011) was an American jazz bassist, composer, and record producer from Philadelphia.

Having played together in a previous cover band, Fambrough joined Grover Washington Jr.'s band in 1970. Five years later, he transferred to Airto Moreira's band. After two years with Moreira, he joined up with McCoy Tyner to become anchor of Tyner's band, until 1982, when he joined Art Blakey's Jazz Messengers whom with he performed during the early 1980s. When trumpeter Wynton Marsalis left the Jazz Messengers to form his own band, Fambrough followed him.

In the liner notes of his 1991 album The Proper Angle, Fambrough mentions the lessons he learned from McCoy Tyner and Art Blakey. The latter taught him to play behind a horn player and within a rhythm section.

Suffering from kidney failure, congestive heart failure, and pulmonary hypertension, he died on January 1, 2011, at the age of 60.

== Discography ==
=== As leader ===
Release year	Album	Personnel	Label
1991	The Proper Angle	Steve Berrios, Mini Cinelu, Joe Ford, Jerry González, Roy Hargrove, Kenny Kirkland, Branford Marsalis, Wynton Marsalis, Jeff "Tain" Watts	CTI
1992	The Charmer	Roy Hargrove, Kenny Garrett, Abdullah Ibrahim, Stephen Scott, Billy Drummond	CTI
1993	Blues at Bradley's	Donald Harrison, Joe Ford, Steve Turre, Bill O'Connell, Bobby Broom, Ricky Sebastian, Steve Berrios	CTI
1995	City Tribes	Craig Handy, John Swana, Bill O'Connell, Ricky Sebsastian, Marlon Simon, Cafe, Dave Valentin	Evidence
1994	Keeper of the Spirit	John Swana, Ralph Bowen, Grover Washington Jr.	AudioQuest
1996	Impressions of Jazz	Eric Mintel	Jazz Lions
1997	Upright Citizen	Grover Washington Jr., Gerald Albright, George Duke, Alex Bugnon, Jon Lucien	NuGroove
2002	Live at Zansibar Blue	Bill O'Connell, Joe Ford, Sean Jones, Wilby Fletcher, Lenny White, Roland Guerrero	Random Chance
2003	StoneJazz	Mark Kramer, Lenny White, Mulgrew Miller, Steve Johns, Ralph Peterson, George Colligan	LightYear

=== As sideman ===
With Kei Akagi

- Mirror Puzzle (1994)

With Art Blakey

- Live at Montreux and Northsea (Timeless, 1980)
- Art Blakey in Sweden (Amigo, 1981)
- Album of the Year (Timeless, 1981)
- Straight Ahead (Concord Jazz, 1981)
- Killer Joe (Union Jazz, 1981) - with George Kawaguchi
- Keystone 3 (Concord Jazz, 1982)
- Oh-By the Way (Timeless, 1982)

With Craig Handy

- Introducing Three for All + One (Arabesque, 1993)

With Roy Hargrove

- Diamond in the Rough (Novus/RCA, 1990)

With Wynton Marsalis

- Fathers and Sons (1982)
- Wynton Marsalis (Columbia, 1982)

With Eric Mintel

- Impressions of Jazz (Jazz Lions, 1996)

With Pharoah Sanders

- Crescent with Love (Venus, 1992)

With McCoy Tyner

- Focal Point (1976)
- The Greeting (1978)
- Horizon (1979)

With Roland Kirk

- Boogie-Woogie String Along for Real (1977)
