= In This Korner =

Live album by Art Blakey and the Jazz Messengers
- Released: 1978
- Recorded: May 8, 1978
- Venue: Keystone Korner, San Francisco, California
- Genre: Jazz
- Label: Concord Jazz; CJ 68
- Producer: Frank Dorritie

Art Blakey and the Jazz Messengers chronology
In My Prime Vol. 2 (1977)	In This Korner (1978)	Reflections in Blue (1978)

In This Korner is a live album by drummer Art Blakey and the Jazz Messengers recorded at the Keystone Korner in San Francisco in 1978 and released on the Concord Jazz label.

== Reception ==
Professional ratings
Review scores
Source	Rating
Allmusic	3/5 stars
The Rolling Stone Jazz Record Guide	4/5 stars

Allmusic awarded the album 3 stars stating that "Although one of the lesser-known editions of The Jazz Messengers, the sextet featured on this Concord session could hold its own with its more acclaimed predecessors and successors".

== Track listing ==
All compositions by James Williams except where noted.

1. Art Blakey Intro - 1:17
2. "Pamela" (Bobby Watson) - 9:31
3. "Unlimited" - 6:36
4. "In This Korner" - 7:47
5. "The Song Is You" (Oscar Hammerstein II, Jerome Kern) - 7:28
6. "Dark Side, Light Side" (George Cables) - 10:11
7. "1977 A.D." - 10:19 Bonus track on CD
8. "Blue for Two" (Valery Ponomarev) - 7:33

== Personnel ==
- Art Blakey - drums
- Valery Ponomarev - trumpet
- Bobby Watson - alto saxophone
- David Schnitter - tenor saxophone
- James Williams - piano
- Dennis Irwin - bass
