= Keystone 3 =

Live album by Art Blakey and the Jazz Messengers
- Released: 1982
- Recorded: January 1982; Keystone Korner, San Francisco, California
- Genre: Jazz
- Length: 46:33
- Label: Concord Jazz; CJ 196
- Producer: Frank Dorritie

Art Blakey chronology
Killer Joe (1981)	Keystone 3 (1982)	Oh-By the Way (1982)

The Jazz Messengers chronology
Straight Ahead (1981)	Keystone 3 (1982)	Oh-By the Way (1982)

Keystone 3 is a live album by drummer Art Blakey and The Jazz Messengers recorded at the Keystone Korner in San Francisco in 1982 and released on the Concord Jazz label.

== Reception ==
Professional ratings
Review scores
Source	Rating
Allmusic	4/5 stars
The Penguin Guide to Jazz Recordings	3.5/4 stars

Michael G. Nastos of Allmusic stated "Of the many live recordings with different Jazz Messengers lineups, this ranks among their best, and is a springboard for what the Marsalis brothers would offer as artists in their own right. With Blakey, this combination was special".

== Track listing ==
1. "In Walked Bud" (Thelonious Monk) - 8:25
2. "In A Sentimental Mood" (Duke Ellington, Manny Kurtz, Irving Mills) - 7:15
3. "Fuller Love" (Bobby Watson) - 8:49
4. "Waterfalls" (Wynton Marsalis) - 11:28
5. "A La Mode" (Curtis Fuller) - 10:36

== Personnel ==
- Art Blakey - drums
- Wynton Marsalis - trumpet
- Branford Marsalis - alto saxophone
- Bill Pierce - tenor saxophone
- Donald Brown - piano
- Charles Fambrough - bass
