= Not Yet (Art Blakey album) =

Studio album by Art Blakey and the Jazz Messengers
- Released: 1988
- Recorded: March 19, 1988
- Studio: Barigozzi Studio, Milano, Italy
- Genre: Jazz
- Length: 58:42
- Label: Soul Note; SN 1105
- Producer: Giovanni Bonandrini

Art Blakey chronology
Feeling Good (1986)	Not Yet (1988)	Feel the Wind (1988)

Not Yet is an album by drummer Art Blakey and the Jazz Messengers recorded in Italy in 1988 and released on the Soul Note label.

== Reception ==
Professional ratings
Review scores
Source	Rating
Allmusic	4/5 stars

Scott Yanow of Allmusic stated "The 1988 edition of The Jazz Messengers, which drummer Art Blakey had been leading for 33 years, showed a great deal of promise... The music may not have contained too many surprises or been startlingly new, but the results are quite pleasing".

== Track listing ==
1. "Kenji's Mood" (Benny Green) - 9:37
2. "For Heaven's Sake" (Elise Bretton, Sherman Edwards, Don Meyer) - 7:21
3. "Not Yet" (Javon Jackson) - 6:45
4. "I'll Never Be The Same" (Gus Kahn, Matty Malneck, Frank Signorelli) - 9:18
5. "Uranus" (Walter Davis, Jr.) - 9:25
6. "Falling in Love with Love" (Lorenz Hart, Richard Rodgers) - 9:18
7. "Kelo" (J. J. Johnson) - 6:58

== Personnel ==
- Art Blakey - drums
- Philip Harper - trumpet
- Robin Eubanks - trombone
- Javon Jackson - tenor saxophone
- Benny Green - piano
- Peter Washington - bass
