= Dance with Death (album) =

Dance With Death

Studio album by Andrew Hill
- Released: 1980
- Recorded: October 11, 1968
- Studio: Van Gelder Studio, Englewood Cliffs, NJ
- Genre: Jazz
- Length: 38:43
- Label: Blue Note; LT 1030
- Producer: Francis Wolff

Andrew Hill chronology
Grass Roots (1968)	Dance With Death (1980)	Lift Every Voice (1970)

Dance with Death is a studio album by American jazz pianist Andrew Hill featuring performances recorded in 1968 but not released on the Blue Note label until 1980. The album features Hill with saxophonist Joe Farrell, trumpeter Charles Tolliver, bassist Victor Sproles and drummer Billy Higgins performing six originals with an alternate take added to the 2004 CD reissue.

== Reception ==
Professional ratings
Review scores
Source	Rating
AllMusic	4.5/5 stars
Tom Hull	A−
The Penguin Guide to Jazz Recordings	4/4 stars

The AllMusic review by Thom Jurek called Dance with Death "a phenomenal record, one that wears its adventure and authority well".

== Track listing ==
All compositions by Andrew Hill

1. "Yellow Violet" - 5:32
2. "Partitions" - 5:52
3. "Fish 'n Rice" - 7:31
4. "Dance With Death" - 6:40
5. "Love Nocturne" - 6:44
6. "Black Sabbath" - 6:24
7. "Dance With Death" [Alternate Take] - 7:14 Bonus track on CD reissue

== Personnel ==
- Andrew Hill - piano
- Charles Tolliver - trumpet
- Joe Farrell - soprano saxophone (track 1), tenor saxophone (tracks 2–7)
- Victor Sproles - bass
- Billy Higgins - drums
