= Jaw's Blues =

Live album by Eddie "Lockjaw" Davis
- Released: 1981
- Recorded: February 11, 1981
- Venue: The Domicile, Munich, West Germany
- Genre: Jazz
- Length: 52:07
- Label: Enja; 3097 ST
- Producer: Horst Weber & Matthias Winckelmann

Eddie "Lockjaw" Davis chronology
The Heavy Hitter (1979)	Jaw's Blues (1981)	Live at the Widder (1981)

Jaw's Blues is a live album by American jazz saxophonist Eddie "Lockjaw" Davis recorded in Munich in 1981 and released on the German Enja label.

== Critical reception ==
Professional ratings
Review scores
Source	Rating
Allmusic	4/5 stars

Allmusic stated "The tough-toned and always-passionate tenor saxophonist Eddie "Lockjaw" Davis is in typically combative form on this quartet date ... Fans of the tenor will want this swinging set".

== Track listing ==
1. "I'll Remember April" (Gene de Paul, Patricia Johnston, Don Raye) – 6:24
2. "Young Man With a Horn" (George Stoll, Ralph Freed) – 4:18
3. "What Is This Thing Called Love?" (Cole Porter) – 7:01
4. "Broadway" (Billy Bird, Teddy McRae, Henri Woode) – 7:28
5. "But Beautiful" (Jimmy Van Heusen, Johnny Burke) – 4:41
6. "Jaw's Blues" (Eddie "Lockjaw" Davis) – 7:31
7. "On Green Dolphin Street" (Bronisław Kaper, Ned Washington) – 7:30 Bonus track on CD reissue
8. "Days of Wine and Roses" (Henry Mancini, Johnny Mercer) – 7:14 Bonus track on CD reissue

== Personnel ==
- Eddie "Lockjaw" Davis – tenor saxophone
- Horace Parlan – piano
- Reggie Johnson – bass
- Alvin Queen – drums
