= Killer Joe (George Kawaguchi & Art Blakey album) =

Studio album by George Kawaguchi and Art Blakey
- Released: 1982
- Recorded: December 4, 1981; Columbia Studio B, New York City
- Genre: Jazz
- Label: Union Jazz; ULP-5001
- Producer: Teo Macero

Art Blakey chronology
Straight Ahead (1981)	Killer Joe (1982)	Keystone 3 (1982)

Killer Joe is an album by drummer Art Blakey with Japanese drummer George Kawaguchi recorded in 1981 and originally released on the Japanese Union Jazz label but later released on Storyville in the US.

== Reception ==
Professional ratings
Review scores
Source	Rating
Allmusic	2.5/5 stars
The Rolling Stone Jazz Record Guide	3/5 stars

Scott Yanow of Allmusic states that "This unusual LP finds Art Blakey and the Jazz Messengers adding a second drummer, the fine Japanese player George Kawaguchi, to a set featuring three standards and two Kawaguchi pieces... Fine music, although a bit of an oddity".

== Track listing ==
All compositions by George Kawaguchi except as indicated

1. "Killer Joe" (Benny Golson) - 10:00
2. "A Night in Tunisia" (Dizzy Gillespie) - 9:15
3. "Well You Needn't" (Thelonious Monk) - 6:47
4. "Tin Tin Teo" - 6:41
5. "Big Apple Jump" - 6:36

== Personnel ==
- George Kawaguchi, Art Blakey - drums
- Wallace Roney - trumpet
- Slide Hampton - trombone
- Branford Marsalis - alto saxophone, tenor saxophone
- Donald Brown - piano
- Charles Fambrough - bass
- Raiji Kawaguchi - percussion (track 2)
