= Jazz Messengers '70 =

Live album by Art Blakey and the Jazz Messengers
- Released: 1970
- Recorded: February 19, 1970; Tokyo, Japan
- Genre: Jazz
- Length: 49:08
- Label: Catalyst; CAT 7902

Art Blakey chronology
Hold On, I'm Coming (1966)	Jazz Messengers '70 (1970)	The Giants of Jazz (1971)

The Jazz Messengers chronology
Buttercorn Lady (1966)	Jazz Messengers '70 (1970)	Child's Dance (1972)

Jazz Messengers '70 is a live album by drummer Art Blakey's Jazz Messengers recorded in Tokyo in 1970 and originally released on the Catalyst label.

== Reception ==
Professional ratings
Review scores
Source	Rating
Allmusic	3/5 stars
The Rolling Stone Jazz Record Guide	3/5 stars

Scott Yanow of Allmusic stated, "the quintet casts new light on these tunes, making them sound fresh and flexible. This unusual set is recommended to longtime followers of Art Blakey".

== Track listing ==
1. "Moanin'" (Bobby Timmons) - 5:46
2. "Blues March" (Benny Golson) - 4:56
3. "Whisper Not" (Golson) - 6:34
4. "What the World Needs Now Is Peace and Love" (Carlos Garnett) - 6:48
5. "It's Only a Paper Moon" (Harold Arlen, Yip Harburg) - 10:14
6. "Politely" (Bill Hardman) - 5:22
7. "A Night in Tunisia" (Dizzy Gillespie) - 9:28

== Personnel ==
- Art Blakey - drums
- Bill Hardman - trumpet
- Carlos Garnett - tenor saxophone
- JoAnne Brackeen - piano
- Jan Arnet - bass
