= Reflections in Blue (Art Blakey album) =

Studio album by Art Blakey and the Jazz Messengers
- Released: 1979
- Recorded: December 4, 1978; Fendal Sound Recording Studios, Loenen Aan De Vecht, the Netherlands
- Genre: Jazz
- Labels: Timeless; SJP 128
- Producer: Wim Wigt

Art Blakey and the Jazz Messengers chronology
In This Korner (1978)	Reflections in Blue (1979)	Night in Tunisia: Digital Recording (1979)

Reflections in Blue is an album by the drummer Art Blakey and the Jazz Messengers, recorded in 1978 in the Netherlands and released on the Dutch Timeless label.

== Reception ==
Professional ratings
Review scores
Source	Rating
AllMusic	3/5 stars
The Rolling Stone Jazz Record Guide	3/5 stars

The Globe and Mail noted that, "since his playing here is remarkable largely for being unremarkable—not at all poor but certainly self-effacing—it falls to the others in the sextet to provide the moments of interest... And though they're all competent players, they're not yet original voices, and rarely does any one transcend the well-worn pattern of Blakey's hard-bop style."

AllMusic awarded the album 3 stars, stating that "the 1978 Jazz Messengers was one of Art Blakey's strongest groups in years, although it would soon be overshadowed by its successor."

== Track listing ==
All compositions by James Williams except as indicated

1. "Reflections in Blue" - 4:45
2. "E.T.A." (Bobby Watson) - 4:54
3. "Say, Dr. "J"" - 8:57
4. "Mishima" (David Schnitter) - 6:37
5. "My Foolish Heart" (Victor Young, Ned Washington) - 3:50
6. "My One and Only Love" (Guy Wood, Robert Mellin) - 5:20
7. "Ellington Medley: Chelsea Bridge/In a Sentimental Mood" (Billy Strayhorn/Duke Ellington) - 9:50
8. "Stretching" - 5:10

== Personnel ==
- Art Blakey - drums
- Valery Ponomarev - trumpet
- Bobby Watson - alto saxophone
- David Schnitter - tenor saxophone
- James Williams - piano
- Dennis Irwin - double bass
