= The Sixth Sense (Lee Morgan album) =

Studio album by Lee Morgan
- Released: Mid July 1970
- Recorded: November 10, 1967; September 13, 1968
- Studio: Van Gelder Studio, Englewood Cliffs, NJ
- Genre: Post-bop, hard bop
- Length: 39:04 original LP; 56:25 CD reissue
- Label: Blue Note; BST 84335
- Producer: Francis Wolff (#1–6); Duke Pearson (#7–9)

Lee Morgan chronology
The Procrastinator (1967)	The Sixth Sense (1970)	Taru (1968)

The Sixth Sense is an album by jazz trumpeter Lee Morgan, released on the Blue Note label in 1970. The album features performances by Morgan, Jackie McLean, Frank Mitchell, Cedar Walton, Victor Sproles and Billy Higgins. The CD reissue added three tracks featuring Harold Mabern and Mickey Bass.

== Reception ==
The AllMusic review by Michael G. Nastos stated: "The appropriately title Sixth Sense presents a transition between one of the most intriguing sextets during the last years of post-bop and Morgan's final ensembles that saw him reaching higher and higher before, like Icarus, falling from grace.".

Professional ratings
Review scores
Source	Rating
Allmusic	3.5/5 stars
The Penguin Guide to Jazz	3/4 stars
The Rolling Stone Jazz Record Guide	3/5 stars

== Track listing ==
All compositions by Lee Morgan, except where indicated.

1. "The Sixth Sense" - 6:45
2. "Short Count" - 6:02
3. "Psychedelic" - 6:32
4. "Afreaka" (Walton) - 8:03
5. "Anti Climax" - 6:19
6. "The Cry of My People" (Cal Massey) - 5:23

Bonus tracks on CD reissue:

7. "Extemporaneous" (Mitchell) - 5:08
8. "Mickey's Tune" (Bass) - 6:35
9. "Leebop" - 5:38

Recorded on November 10, 1967 (tracks 1–6) and September 13, 1968 (tracks 7–9).

== Personnel ==
- Lee Morgan - trumpet
- Jackie McLean - alto saxophone (tracks 1 to 5)
- Frank Mitchell - tenor saxophone
- Cedar Walton - piano (1 to 6)
- Victor Sproles - bass (1 to 6)
- Billy Higgins - drums
- Harold Mabern - piano (7 to 9)
- Mickey Bass - bass (7 to 9)
