= Mellow (Sonny Stitt album) =

Studio album by Sonny Stitt
- Released: 1975
- Recorded: February 14, 1975
- Studio: Blue Rock Studios, New York City
- Genre: Jazz
- Label: Muse; MR 5067
- Producer: Gary Giddins

Sonny Stitt chronology
Never Can Say Goodbye (1975)	Mellow (1975)	In Walked Sonny (1975)

Professional ratings
Review scores
Source	Rating
Allmusic	4/5 stars
The Rolling Stone Jazz Record Guide	3/5 stars

Mellow is an album by saxophonist Sonny Stitt recorded in 1975 and released on the Muse label.

== Reception ==
Allmusic reviewed the album calling it "A good session of 1970s bop".

== Track listing ==
All compositions by Sonny Stitt except where noted.

1. "A Sailboat in the Moonlight" (Carmen Lombardo, John Jacob Loeb) - 6:44
2. "If You Could See Me Now" (Tadd Dameron) - 5:00
3. "A Cute One" - 8:12
4. "I Should Care" (Axel Stordahl, Paul Weston, Sammy Cahn) - 5:43
5. "Soon" (George Gershwin, Ira Gershwin) - 3:40
6. "How High the Moon" (Nancy Hamilton, Morgan Lewis) - 6:30

== Personnel ==
- Sonny Stitt - alto saxophone, tenor saxophone
- Jimmy Heath - flute, soprano saxophone, tenor saxophone
- Barry Harris - piano
- Richard Davis - bass
- Roy Haynes - drums
