= In My Prime Vol. 1 =

Studio album by Art Blakey and the Jazz Messengers
- Released: 1978
- Recorded: December 29, 1977; CI Recording Studios, New York City
- Genre: Jazz
- Label: Timeless; SJP 114
- Producer: Wim Wigt

Art Blakey and the Jazz Messengers chronology
Gypsy Folk Tales (1977)	In My Prime Vol. 1 (1978)	In My Prime Vol. 2 (1977)

In My Prime Vol. 1 is an album by drummer Art Blakey and the Jazz Messengers recorded in 1977 and released on the Dutch Timeless label.

== Reception ==
Professional ratings
Review scores
Source	Rating
Allmusic	3/5 stars
The Rolling Stone Jazz Record Guide	3/5 stars

Allmusic awarded the album 3 stars stating that "Despite the changes in musical fashions, Art Blakey and his hard-bop institution were still turning out new material and solos in the late '70s that sound fresh and alive today".

== Track listing ==
1. "Jody" (Walter Davis, Jr.) - 10:21
2. "Not So Far At All" (Valery Ponomarev) - 3:27
3. "1978" (James Williams) - 7:27
4. "To See Her Face" (Robert Watson) - 6:24
5. "Kamal" (Dennis Irwin) - 14:40

== Personnel ==
- Art Blakey - drums
- Valery Ponomarev - trumpet
- Curtis Fuller - trombone
- Robert Watson - alto saxophone
- David Schnitter - tenor saxophone
- James Williams - piano
- Dennis Irwin - bass
- Ray Mantilla - percussion
