= Kyoto (Art Blakey album) =

Studio album by Art Blakey and the Jazz Messengers
- Released: Mid October 1966
- Recorded: February 20, 1964; New York City
- Genre: Jazz
- Length: 32:21
- Label: Riverside; RLP-493
- Producer: Orrin Keepnews

Art Blakey and the Jazz Messengers chronology
Free for All (1965)	Kyoto (1966)	Indestructible (1964)

Kyoto is an album by Art Blakey and the Jazz Messengers, recorded in 1964 and released on the Riverside label.

== Reception ==
The Allmusic review by Scott Yanow awarded the album 3 stars stating "this is one of literally dozens of recommended Jazz Messengers recordings".

Professional ratings
Review scores
Source	Rating
Allmusic	3/5 stars
DownBeat	3.5/5 stars
The Rolling Stone Jazz Record Guide	4/5 stars
The Penguin Guide to Jazz Recordings	3/4 stars

== Track listing ==
1. "The High Priest" (Curtis Fuller) – 5:55
2. "Never Never Land" (Betty Comden, Adolph Green, Jule Styne) – 5:50
3. "Wellington's Blues" (Art Blakey) – 5:03
4. "Nihon Bash" (Sadao Watanabe) – 8:30
5. "Kyoto" (Freddie Hubbard) – 7:03

== Personnel ==
- Art Blakey – drums
- Freddie Hubbard – trumpet
- Curtis Fuller – trombone
- Wayne Shorter – tenor saxophone
- Cedar Walton – piano
- Reggie Workman – bass
- Wellington Blakey – vocals (track 3)
