= Ugetsu (album) =

Live album by Art Blakey's Jazz Messengers
- Released: October 1963
- Recorded: June 16, 1963
- Venue: Birdland, New York City
- Genre: Jazz
- Length: 62:36 (2011 CD reissue)
- Label: Riverside; RLP-464
- Producer: Orrin Keepnews

Art Blakey chronology
Caravan (1963)	Ugetsu (1963)	A Jazz Message (1963)

The Jazz Messengers chronology
Caravan (1963)	Ugetsu (1963)	Free for All (1964)

Professional ratings
Review scores
Source	Rating
DownBeat (Original Lp release)	4.5/5 stars
AllMusic	4.0/5 stars

Ugetsu: Art Blakey's Jazz Messengers at Birdland is a live jazz album by Art Blakey and the Jazz Messengers released on Riverside Records in October 1963. The album was recorded at Birdland in New York City.

The original LP had six tracks and producer Orrin Keepnews stated in the liner notes that "there were other performances taped that night that couldn't be fitted into the resulting album". When the album was released on CD, Keepnews added three new tracks that were recorded that night. The Jazz Messengers' tour in Japan had ended a few months before this live performance; then the band decided to play two tracks as a homage to Japan: the Cedar Walton composition "Ugetsu" (which Walton also released under the title "Fantasy in D" on his solo albums) and Wayne Shorter's "On the Ginza".

It was reissued in 2011, once more in the Original Jazz Classics series, with a previously unissued track, "Conception".

== Track listing ==
=== Original LP release ===
Side A

1. "One By One" (Wayne Shorter) – 6:18
2. "Ugetsu" (Cedar Walton) – 11:03
3. "Time Off" (Curtis Fuller) – 4:56

Side B

1. "Ping-Pong" (Shorter) – 8:09
2. "I Didn't Know What Time It Was" (Richard Rodgers, Lorenz Hart) – 6:32
3. "On the Ginza" (Shorter) – 7:04

=== 2011 CD reissue ===
1. "One By One" (Wayne Shorter) – 6:22
2. "Ugetsu" (Cedar Walton) – 11:03
3. "Time Off" (Curtis Fuller) – 4:58
4. "Ping-Pong" (Shorter) – 8:10
5. "I Didn't Know What Time It Was" (Richard Rodgers, Lorenz Hart) – 6:31
6. "On the Ginza" (Shorter) – 7:07

Bonus Tracks

1. "Eva" (Shorter) – 5:55
2. "The High Priest" (Fuller) – 5:32
3. "Conception" (George Shearing) – 5:15
4. "The Theme" (Miles Davis) – 1:43

== Personnel ==
- Art Blakey – drums
- Freddie Hubbard – trumpet
- Curtis Fuller – trombone
- Wayne Shorter – tenor sax
- Cedar Walton – piano
- Reggie Workman – double bass
