= Frank Mitchell (musician) =

American jazz tenor saxophonist (c. 1945-1971)

Frank Mitchell (c.1945–c.1971) was a New York jazz tenor saxophonist who worked with Art Blakey and Lee Morgan.

Born in The Bronx and Graduated De Witt Clinton High School with Alumni Jerry Jemmott (Bassist), Mitchell's first professional work was at the age of 19, with Art Blakey, when he joined the New Jazz Messengers. The line-up, comprising Blakey, Mitchell, Chuck Mangione, Keith Jarrett, and Reggie Johnson, had a month-long residency at the Five Spot Café in December 1965, before going on to The Lighthouse nightclub in Hermosa Beach, California, where they recorded the live album, Buttercorn Lady, at the beginning of 1966.

Mitchell briefly led his own band for a John Coltrane memorial concert shortly after Coltrane died, and then went on to become a member of a quintet led by Lee Morgan, with Cedar Walton, Victor Sproles, Billy Higgins, a line-up that Jackie McLean sat in with for a Blue Note recording released in 1970. Mitchell was replaced by George Coleman in summer 1969.

Mitchell was murdered at the age of 27.

== Discography ==
- 1966: Buttercorn Lady – Art Blakey and the New Jazz Messengers (Limelight 82034)
- 1966: Hold On, I'm Coming – Art Blakey (Limelight 86038)
- 1968: Grass Roots - Andrew Hill (Blue Note BST 84303)
- 1970: The Sixth Sense – Lee Morgan (Blue Note BST 84335)
