= Free for All (album) =

Studio album by Art Blakey and the Jazz Messengers
- Released: July 1965
- Recorded: February 10, 1964
- Studio: Van Gelder Studio (Englewood Cliffs, New Jersey)
- Genre: Post-bop
- Length: 36:47
- Label: Blue Note; BST 84170
- Producer: Alfred Lion

Art Blakey chronology
A Jazz Message (1963)	Free for All (1965)	Kyoto (1966)

The Jazz Messengers chronology
Ugetsu (1963)	Free for All (1965)	Kyoto (1966)

Professional ratings
Review scores
Source	Rating
Allmusic	4/5 stars
The Rolling Stone Jazz Record Guide	5/5 stars
The Penguin Guide to Jazz Recordings	4/4 stars
DownBeat	5/5 stars

Free for All is a studio album by Art Blakey and the Jazz Messengers, recorded on February 10, 1964, and released on Blue Note Records in July 1965. It was originally titled Free Fall.

The Allmusic review by Al Campbell awards the album 4 stars and states, "This edition of the Jazz Messengers had been together since 1961 with a lineup that would be hard to beat: Freddie Hubbard on trumpet... Wayne Shorter on tenor sax, Curtis Fuller on trombone, Cedar Walton on piano, and Reggie Workman on bass. Shorter's title track is one of the finest moments in the Jazz Messengers' history."

== Composition ==
Freddie Hubbard's composition "The Core" is dedicated to the Congress of Racial Equality (CORE) and expresses "Hubbard's admiration of that organization's persistence and resourcefulness in its work for total, meaningful equality." He explained: "They're getting at the core, at the center of the kinds of change that have to take place before this society is really open to everyone. And more than any other group, CORE is getting to youth, and that's where the center of change is." Hubbard also felt that the band "got at some of the core of jazz – the basic feelings and rhythms that are at the foundation of music" on the track.

Clare Fischer's "Pensativa" was arranged by Hubbard for the occasion: "I was playing a gig in Long Island and the pianist started playing it. The mood got me, this feeling of a pensive woman. And the melody was so beautiful that, after I'd gotten home, I couldn't get it out of my mind."

The album was intended to have featured Wayne Shorter's composition "Eva" and two tracks with vocals by Wellington Blakey, bandleader Art Blakey's cousin. These were attempted, but no valid takes were recorded. Additionally, the musicians tried a second take of "Free for All", an attempt that producer Alfred Lion had to stop because Blakey's drums broke. This alternate take, first released on the limited 2014 Japanese SHM-CD remaster of the album, is three minutes shorter.

== Track listing ==
=== Original vinyl ===
No.	Title	Writer(s)	Length
1.	"Free for All"	Wayne Shorter	11:04
2.	"Hammer Head"	Shorter	7:47
3.	"The Core"	Freddie Hubbard	9:24
4.	"Pensativa"	Clare Fischer, arr. Hubbard	8:19

=== 2014 Blue Note SHM-CD Remaster Edition (Japan Release) ===
No.	Title	Writer(s)	Length
1.	"Free for All"	Shorter	11:04
2.	"Hammer Head"	Shorter	7:47
3.	"The Core"	Hubbard	9:24
4.	"Pensativa"	Fischer	8:19
5.	"Free for All" (Alternate Take)	Shorter	8:26

== Personnel ==
- Art Blakey – drums
- Freddie Hubbard – trumpet
- Curtis Fuller – trombone
- Wayne Shorter – tenor saxophone
- Cedar Walton – piano
- Reggie Workman – double bass

== Charts ==
Chart performance for Free for All
Chart (2026)	Peak position
UK Jazz & Blues Albums (OCC)	22
