= New York Scene =

Live album by Art Blakey and the Jazz Messengers
- Released: 1984
- Recorded: May 1984; Mikell's, New York City
- Genre: Jazz
- Length: 43:59
- Label: Concord Jazz; CJ 256
- Producer: Frank Dorritie

Art Blakey and the Jazz Messengers chronology
Oh-By the Way (1982)	New York Scene (1984)	Live at Kimball's (1985)

New York Scene is a live album by drummer Art Blakey and The Jazz Messengers recorded in New York City in 1984 and released on the Concord Jazz label.

== Reception ==
Professional ratings
Review scores
Source	Rating
Allmusic	4/5 stars

Scott Yanow of Allmusic called it "a fine set of hard bop". Writing for United Press International, Ken Franckling praised the album "boppish delights", stating that it was "the key training ground for generation after generation of the Young Turks in jazz."

=== Awards ===
The album won the award for Best Jazz Instrumental Album during the 27th Annual Grammy Awards.

== Track listing ==
1. "Oh, By The Way" (Terence Blanchard) – 10:06
2. "Ballad Medley: My One and Only Love/It's Easy to Remember/Who Cares?" (Guy Wood, Robert Mellin/Richard Rodgers, Lorenz Hart/George Gershwin, Ira Gershwin) – 7:23
3. "Controversy" (Donald Harrison) – 5:24
4. "Tenderly" (Walter Gross, Jack Lawrence) – 11:12
5. "Falafel" (Mulgrew Miller) – 9:54

== Personnel ==
- Art Blakey – drums
- Terence Blanchard – trumpet
- Donald Harrison – alto saxophone
- Jean Toussaint – tenor saxophone
- Mulgrew Miller – piano
- Lonnie Plaxico – bass
