= Grass Roots (Andrew Hill album) =

Studio album by Andrew Hill
- Released: 1969
- Recorded: April 19 (tracks 6–10) and August 5, 1968
- Studio: Van Gelder Studio, Englewood Cliffs, NJ
- Genre: Jazz
- Length: 69:02
- Label: Blue Note; BST 84303
- Producer: Francis Wolff

Andrew Hill chronology
Change (1966)	Grass Roots (1969)	Dance with Death (1968)

Grass Roots is a studio album by American pianist Andrew Hill featuring performances recorded in 1968 and released on the Blue Note label. The original album features Hill with trumpeter Lee Morgan, tenor saxophonist Booker Ervin, bassist Ron Carter and drummer Freddie Waits performing five of his originals. The 2000 CD reissue added alternate versions of three of the pieces (and two additional compositions) recorded by a sextet with trumpeter Woody Shaw, tenor saxophonist Frank Mitchell, guitarist Jimmy Ponder, bassist Reggie Workman and drummer Idris Muhammad at an earlier session as bonus tracks.

== Reception ==
The Allmusic review by Stephen Thomas Erlewine awarded the album 4 stars stating "the songs have strong melodies, even hooks, to bring casual listeners in, but they give the musicians the freedom to find a distinctive voice in their solos".

Professional ratings
Review scores
Source	Rating
Allmusic	4/5 stars
DownBeat	4/5 stars

== Track listing ==
All compositions by Andrew Hill

1. "Grass Roots" - 5:41
2. "Venture Inward" - 4:46
3. "Mira" - 6:20
4. "Soul Special" - 8:22
5. "Bayou Red" - 7:45
6. "MC" - 9:11 Bonus track on CD reissue
7. "Venture Inward" [First Version] - 4:34 Bonus track on CD reissue
8. "Soul Special" [First Version] - 8:51 Bonus track on CD reissue
9. "Bayou Red" [First Version] - 5:59 Bonus track on CD reissue
10. "Love Nocturne" - 7:33 Bonus track on CD reissue

== Personnel ==
- Andrew Hill - piano
- Lee Morgan (tracks 1–5), Woody Shaw (tracks 6–10) - trumpet
- Booker Ervin (tracks 1–5), Frank Mitchell (tracks 6–10) - tenor saxophone
- Jimmy Ponder - guitar (tracks 6–10)
- Ron Carter (tracks 1–5), Reggie Workman (tracks 6–10) - bass
- Idris Muhammad (tracks 6–10), Freddie Waits (tracks 1–5) - drums
