= Live at Montreux and Northsea =

Live album by Art Blakey and the Jazz Messengers Big Band
- Released: 1981
- Recorded: July 13 & 17, 1980
- Venue: Northsea Jazz Festival, The Hague, the Netherlands and Montreux Jazz Festival, Montreux, Switzerland
- Genre: Jazz
- Length: 43:05
- Label: Timeless; SJP 150
- Producer: Wim Wigt

Art Blakey and the Jazz Messengers chronology
One by One (1979)	Live at Montreux and Northsea (1981)	Art Blakey in Sweden (1981)

Live at Montreux and Northsea is an album by drummer Art Blakey and the Jazz Messengers Big Band, recorded in 1980 at the Montreux Jazz Festival in Switzerland (with one track recorded at the North Sea Jazz Festival in the Netherlands) and released on the Dutch Timeless label.

== Reception ==
Professional ratings
Review scores
Source	Rating
AllMusic	4.5/5 stars
The Rolling Stone Jazz Record Guide	3/5 stars

Scott Yanow, writing for AllMusic, called it "a historically significant and rather enjoyable release".

== Track listing ==
All compositions by Bobby Watson except where noted.

1. "Minor Thesis" (James Williams) – 13:17
2. "Wheel Within a Wheel" – 7:02
3. "Bit a Bittadose" – 6:41
4. "Stairway to the Stars" (Matty Malneck, Mitchell Parish, Frank Signorelli) – 8:34
5. "Linwood" – 7:31
- Recorded at the North Sea Jazz Festival in The Hague, the Netherlands on July 13, 1980 (track 1) and at the Montreux Jazz Festival in Montreux, Switzerland on July 17, 1980 (tracks 2–5)

== Personnel ==
- Art Blakey, John Ramsay – drums
- Valery Ponomarev, Wynton Marsalis – trumpet
- Robin Eubanks – trombone
- Bobby Watson – alto saxophone
- Branford Marsalis – alto saxophone, baritone saxophone
- Bill Pierce – tenor saxophone
- James Williams – piano
- Kevin Eubanks – guitar
- Charles Fambrough – bass
