= In Walked Sonny =

Studio album by Sonny Stitt with Art Blakey & the Jazz Messengers
- Released: Late September 1975
- Recorded: May 16, 1975; New York City
- Genre: Jazz
- Length: 45:17 original LP
- Label: Sonet Records/Gazell Records; 1012

Art Blakey & The Jazz Messengers chronology
Anthenagin (1973)	In Walked Sonny (1975)	Backgammon (1976)

Sonny Stitt chronology
Mellow (1975)	In Walked Sonny (1975)	The Bop Session (1975)

Alternative cover
- UK 1975 Vinyl

In Walked Sonny is an album by American jazz musicians Sonny Stitt and Art Blakey with The Jazz Messengers. It was released in 1975 on the small independent label Sonet Records and is among the most obscure recordings made by the musicians involved in the project.

Professional ratings
Review scores
Source	Rating
Allmusic	4.5/5 stars

== Track listing ==
1. "Blues March" (Benny Golson)- 7:29
2. "It Might as Well Be Spring" (Richard Rodgers, Oscar Hammerstein II) - 6:03
3. "Birdlike" (Freddie Hubbard) - 7:40
4. "I Can't Get Started" (George Gershwin, Vernon Duke) - 4:43
5. "Ronnie's a Dynamite Lady" (Walter Davis, Jr.) - 8:16
6. "In Walked Sonny" (Sonny Stitt) - 11:06

Bonus tracks on CD reissue:

7. "Birdlike" [Alternate Take] - 5:53
8. "Ronnie's a Dynamite Lady" [Alternate Take] - 8:35

== Personnel ==
- Sonny Stitt - alto and tenor saxophone
- Art Blakey - drums
- Walter Davis, Jr. - piano
- Bill Hardman - trumpet
- David Schnitter - tenor saxophone
- Yoshio "Chin" Suzuki - bass
