= Hold On, I'm Coming (Art Blakey album) =

Studio album by Art Blakey
- Released: September 1966
- Recorded: May 12, 1965 and May 27, 1966
- Venue: New York City
- Genre: Jazz
- Length: 34:29
- Label: Limelight
- Producer: Jack Tracy and Luchi DeJesus

Art Blakey chronology
Buttercorn Lady (1966)	Hold On, I'm Coming (1966)	Jazz Messengers '70 (1970)

Hold On, I'm Coming is an album by drummer Art Blakey recorded in 1966 (with one track left over from the Gary Bartz debut recording session in 1965 for the album Soul Finger) and originally released on the Limelight label.

== Reception ==
Professional ratings
Review scores
Source	Rating
Allmusic	3.5/5 stars

Allmusic awarded the album 3½ stars, stating: "Ultimately, this is a very enjoyable if not mindblowing soul-jazz date that offers a very relaxed and subtle view of Blakey."

== Track listing ==
1. "Daydream" (John Sebastian) - 3:06
2. "Hold On! I'm Comin'" (Isaac Hayes, David Porter) - 2:34
3. "Secret Agent Man" (Steve Barri, P.F. Sloan) - 2:57
4. "I Can't Grow Peaches on a Cherry Tree" (Camille Monte, Estelle Levitt) - 2:14
5. "Walking My Cat Named Dog" (Norma Tanega) - 1:51
6. "Sakeena" (Art Blakey) - 3:43
7. "Got My Mojo Working" (McKinley Morganfield) - 3:20
8. "Mame" (Jerry Herman) - 2:59
9. "She Blew a Good Thing" (Henry Murray Jr., Ronnie Lewis) - 2:18
10. "Monday, Monday" (John Phillips) - 2:20
11. "Slowly But Surely" (John Hicks) - 7:07

== Personnel ==
- Art Blakey - drums
- Chuck Mangione (tracks 1–10) Freddie Hubbard (track 11), Lee Morgan (track 11) - trumpet
- Garnett Brown - trombone (tracks 1–10)
- Melba Liston - trombone (tracks 1–10), arranger (tracks 1–3)
- Tom McIntosh - trombone (tracks 1–10), arranger (tracks 4–10)
- Frank Mitchell - tenor saxophone (tracks 1–10)
- Gary Bartz (track 11) - alto saxophone
- John Hicks - piano (track 11)
- Big John Patton (credited as Malcolm Bass) - organ (tracks 1–10)
- Grant Green - guitar (tracks 1–10)
- Reggie Johnson (tracks 1–10), Victor Sproles (track 11) - bass
- Johnny Rodriguez - congas
