= Oh-By the Way =

Studio album by Art Blakey and the Jazz Messengers
- Released: 1982
- Recorded: May 20, 1982; Fendal Sound Studios, Loenen Aan De Vecht, the Netherlands
- Genre: Jazz
- Length: 44:03
- Label: Timeless; SJP 165
- Producer: John Ramsey and Wim Wigt

Art Blakey and the Jazz Messengers chronology
Keystone 3 (1982)	Oh-By the Way (1982)	New York Scene (1984)

Oh-By the Way is an album by the drummer Art Blakey and the Jazz Messengers recorded in 1982 in the Netherlands and released on the Dutch Timeless label.

== Reception ==
Professional ratings
Review scores
Source	Rating
Allmusic	3/5 stars

Scott Yanow of Allmusic states that "the music is a fine example of high-quality hard bop".

== Track listing ==
1. "Oh-By the Way" (Terence Blanchard) - 6:24
2. "Duck Soup" (Donald Harrison) - 5:55
3. "Tropical Breeze" (Johnny O'Neal) - 4:48
4. "One by One" (Wayne Shorter) - 5:18
5. "Sudan Blue" (Bill Pierce) - 7:03
6. "My Funny Valentine" (Richard Rodgers, Lorenz Hart) - 8:09
7. "Alicia" (Charles Fambrough) - 5:54

== Personnel ==
- Art Blakey - drums
- Terence Blanchard - trumpet
- Donald Harrison - alto saxophone
- Bill Pierce - tenor saxophone
- Johnny O'Neal - piano
- Charles Fambrough - double bass
