= Reggie Johnson (musician) =

American musician (1940–2020)

Reginald Volney Johnson (December 13, 1940 – September 11, 2020) was an American jazz double-bassist.

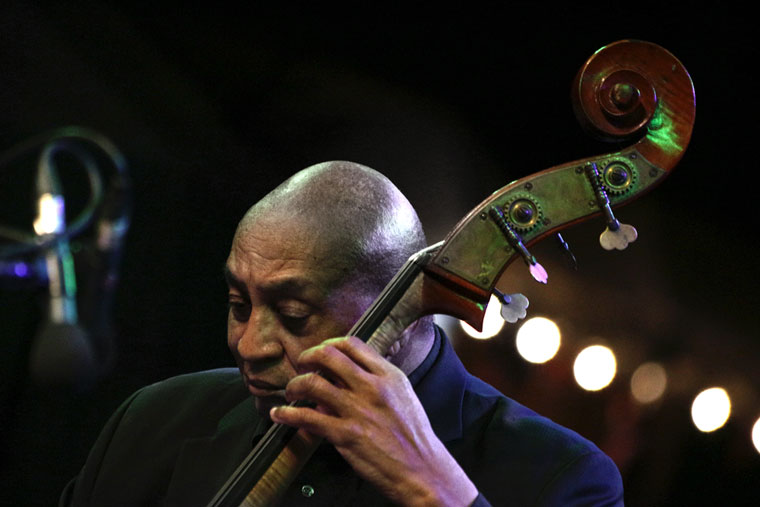
Johnson in Hungary

Johnson was born in Owensboro, Kentucky. After playing trombone with school orchestras and army bands, he switched to double bass, and started working with musicians such as Bill Barron and recording with Archie Shepp in the mid-1960s, before joining Art Blakey's band for a month-long residency at the Five Spot Café in December 1965, and then going on to The Lighthouse nightclub in Hermosa Beach, California, where they recorded the live album, Buttercorn Lady, at the beginning of 1966, with a line-up, comprising Blakey, Frank Mitchell, Chuck Mangione, Keith Jarrett, and Johnson.

He has also played and/or recorded with Bill Dixon, Sun Ra, and Burton Greene, Lonnie Liston Smith, Stanley Cowell, Bobby Hutcherson, Harold Land, Blue Mitchell, Walter Bishop Jr., Sonny Rollins, Sonny Stitt, Sarah Vaughan, Carmen McRae, Art Pepper, Kenny Burrell, Clark Terry, The Crusaders, Johnny Coles, and Frank Wess.

In the mid-1980s he moved to Europe, where he has worked with Johnny Griffin, Horace Parlan, Monty Alexander, Kenny Barron, Tom Harrell, Phil Woods, Cedar Walton, Alvin Queen, Jesse Davis, Freddie Redd and Clark Terry.

Reggie Johnson reportedly died in Bern, Switzerland on September 11, 2020.

== Discography ==
As leader/co-leader

- 1985: First Edition – JR Records

As sideman

- 1965: Fire Music – Archie Shepp (Impulse! Records)
- 1965: "Hambone" on The New Wave in Jazz with Archie Shepp (Impulse! Records)
- 1966: Hold On, I'm Coming – Art Blakey (Limelight)
- 1966: Buttercorn Lady – Art Blakey & The New Jazz Messengers (Limelight)
- 1966: Marion Brown Quartet – Marion Brown
- 1966: More – Giuseppi Logan
- 1967: Juba-Lee – Marion Brown
- 1967: Booker 'n' Brass – Booker Ervin (Pacific Jazz)
- 1968: The Jazz Composer's Orchestra – Jazz Composer's Orchestra (ECM)
- 1968: Total Eclipse – Bobby Hutcherson (Blue Note)
- 1968: Bish Bash - Walter Bishop, Jr. (Xanadu)
- 1969: Orgasm – Alan Shorter (Verve)
- 1971: Coral Keys - Walter Bishop Jr. (Black Jazz)
- 1971: Spring Rain Rudolph Johnson (Black Jazz)
- 1971: Head On – Bobby Hutcherson (Blue Note)
- 1972: Black Vibrations – Sonny Stitt (Prestige)
- 1972: Choma (Burn) - Harold Land (Mainstream)
- 1972: Constant Throb – John Klemmer (Impulse!)
- 1972: 'Round Midnight – Kenny Burrell (Fantasy)
- 1973: Both Feet on the Ground – Kenny Burrell (Fantasy Records)
- 1977: Tin Tin Deo - Kenny Burrell (Concord)
- 1977: Mapenzi – Harold Land-Blue Mitchell Quintet (Concord)
- 1978: Handcrafted - Kenny Burrell (Muse)
- 1979: Spiral – Bobby Hutcherson (Blue Note)
- 1980: Medina – Bobby Hutcherson (Blue Note)
- 1980: Blue Manhattan – Al Haig (Interplay)
- 1981: Jaw's Blues – Eddie "Lockjaw" Davis (Enja)
- 1981: Pannonica – Horace Parlan (Enja)
- 1982: New Morning – Johnny Coles (Criss Cross Jazz)
- 1983: Two at the Top - Frank Wess and Johnny Coles (Uptown)
- 1988: Live at the Theatre Boulogne-Billancourt/Paris, Vol. 1 – Mingus Dynasty (Soul Note)
- 1988: Live at the Theatre Boulogne-Billancourt/Paris, Vol. 2 – Mingus Dynasty (Soul Note)
- 1990: Epitaph – Charles Mingus (posthumous) (Columbia Records)
- 2020: First Time Out: Live at Slugs 1967 – Rashied Ali Quintet (Survival Records)
