= Palcoscenico Records =

Palcoscenico Records was a short-lived Italian jazz record label making songs from 1979 to 1981.

== Discography ==
- 15001: Gaetano Liguori – Terzo Mondo
- 15002: George Adams & Don Pullen – All That Funk (with Cameron Brown, Dannie Richmond)
- 15003: George Adams & Don Pullen – More Funk (with Cameron Brown, Dannie Richmond)
- 15004: Claudio Fasoli New Quartet – Cloudy
- 15005: Art Blakey – One by One (with Curtis Fuller, Bobby Watson, David Schnitter, James Williams, Dennis Irwin, Valery Ponomarev)
- 15006: Leon Thomas – A Piece of Cake (with Freddie Hubbard, Hadley Caliman, Billy Childs, Larry Klein, Carl Burnett)
- 15007: Karl Berger – New Moon
- 15008: Walter Davis, Jr. – Uranus
- 15009: Milt Jackson – Loose Walk (with Sonny Stitt, Gerald Price, Don Moses, Bobby Durham)
