= A Jazz Message =

Studio album by Art Blakey
- Released: October 1963
- Recorded: July 16, 1963
- Studio: Van Gelder Studio, Englewood Cliffs, NJ
- Genre: Jazz
- Length: 35:11
- Label: Impulse! A-45
- Producer: Bob Thiele

Art Blakey chronology
Ugetsu (1963)	A Jazz Message (1963)	Free For All (1964)

Professional ratings
Review scores
Source	Rating
Allmusic	3.0/5 stars
The Rolling Stone Jazz Record Guide	3/5 stars
The Penguin Guide to Jazz Recordings	3.5/4 stars

A Jazz Message is a studio album by the jazz musician Art Blakey and his quartet. It was released in October 1963 through Impulse! Records. It is Blakey's second and last album for the label.

== Track listing ==
1. "Cafe" (Blakey, Stitt) – 5:37
2. "Just Knock On My Door" (Blakey, Stitt) – 7:00
3. "Summertime" (George Gershwin, DuBose Heyward) – 4:42
4. "Blues Back" (Tyner) – 5:23
5. "Sunday" (Chester Conn, Nick Drake, Benny Krueger, Ned Miller, Jule Styne) – 7:23
6. "The Song Is You" (Jerome Kern, Oscar Hammerstein II) – 5:06

== Personnel ==
- Art Blakey – drums
- Sonny Stitt – tenor saxophone (1, 3, 5), alto saxophone (2, 4, 6)
- McCoy Tyner – piano
- Art Davis – bass

Production notes:

- Bob Thiele – producer
- Rudy Van Gelder – engineer
