= Art Blakey in Sweden =

Live album by Art Blakey and the Jazz Messengers
- Released: 1981
- Recorded: March 9, 1981; Södra Teatern, Stockholm, Sweden
- Genre: Jazz
- Length: 43:55
- Label: Amigo; AMLP 839
- Producer: Kavi Alexander

Art Blakey and the Jazz Messengers chronology
Live at Montreux and Northsea (1980)	Art Blakey in Sweden (1981)	Album of the Year (1981)

Art Blakey in Sweden is a live album by drummer Art Blakey and the Jazz Messengers recorded in Stockholm in 1981 and released on the Amigo label.

== Reception ==
Professional ratings
Review scores
Source	Rating
Allmusic	3/5 stars

Ron Wynn of AllMusic stated: "While there are times when the three-horn frontline does not sound completely together during ensemble sections, they mesh by the song's end."

== Track listing ==
1. "Webb City" (Bud Powell) - 12:20
2. "How Deep Is the Ocean?" (Irving Berlin) - 10:07
3. "Skylark" (Hoagy Carmichael, Johnny Mercer) - 8:56
4. "Gypsy Folk Tales" (Walter Davis, Jr.) - 12:24

== Personnel ==
- Art Blakey - drums
- Wynton Marsalis - trumpet
- Bobby Watson - alto saxophone
- Bill Pierce - tenor saxophone
- James Williams - piano
- Charles Fambrough - bass
