= Webb's City =

Department store in the United States

Coordinates: 27°46′6″N 82°38′43″W

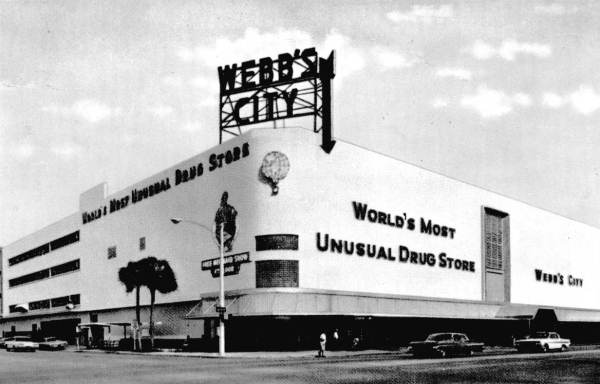
- Webb's City Building (1973)
- Type: Private
- Industry: Department store
- Founded: 1926
- Founder: James Earl Webb
- Defunct: August 18, 1979
- Fate: Liquidation
- Headquarters: St. Petersburg, Florida
- Area served: Tampa Bay

Webb's City was a one-stop department store that was located in St. Petersburg, Florida. Founded in 1926, it claimed to be "the World's Most Unusual Drug Store;" founder James Earl "Doc" Webb has been described as "the P. T. Barnum of specialty store retailing". Sideshows included animal tricks, acrobats, and talking mermaids.

At its peak, Webb's City had 77 departments, 1,700 employees, and covered about ten city blocks. It was considered a forerunner to the shopping center.

The jingle in its radio ad was: "There'll be no more hoppin' around the town a-shoppin', Webb's City is your one-stop shopping store." As shopping centers became popular, business dwindled at Webb's City, which closed in 1979.

Doc Webb's philosophy regarding Webb City was "stack it high and sell it cheap", a tactic years later picked up by Sam Walton for his Walmart empire. Ronald D. Michman and Edward M. Mazze attribute its success in St. Petersburg, which was "populated by a larger than average number of elderly citizens who desired to patronize an interesting complex to spend their pension money". Because of its location, sales, and low prices its shopping base primarily consisted of senior citizens and African Americans. The store hired from the African American community, though it had whites-only shopping areas and purposely did not allow black workers to rise in rank. This racial glass ceiling and discrimination became the focus of Civil Rights sit-ins and controversies during the 1960s.

== History ==
Webb's had a gift shop, hardware store, meat market, beauty salon, travel agency, clothing departments, cafeteria, multiple coffee shops and soda fountains and a drugstore. Doc Webb's son later said that Webb's City introduced the idea of the express checkout lane, for ten or fewer items. Webb's Outpost was a much smaller store located near the end of the Gandy Bridge to Tampa. A short-lived branch was also opened in the nearby city of Pinellas Park, Florida, which could be considered a forerunner of big-box discount stores such as Wal-Mart and Target.

Haircuts were available for a quarter and a breakfast was available for two cents. Doc once sold dollar bills for 95 cents. Entertainment included ducks playing baseball, a dancing chicken, kissing rabbits, and a dancing chicken. In-store sideshow performances including talking mermaids and circus acrobats were not unusual.

=== Low price lawsuits ===
In 1939, newspapers favorably reported that Webb sold 50-cent tubes of Ipana toothpaste for 13 cents each, possibly as a publicity stunt. Although press attention was positive, the manufacturers were "not amused" at their products being discounted from the manufacturer suggested retail price. The case went all the way to the Florida Supreme Court, which ruled in Webb's favor. A few years later, several distilleries also took Webb to court for similar reasons; the courts again ruled in Webb's favor.

=== Racial discrimination ===
From its 1926 founding to about 1960 (especially prior to the Civil Rights Movement), Doc Webb's business was unusual in that Doc would hire African Americans while other businesses in St. Petersburg would not. However, African Americans were only hired for positions that were less visible and considered suitable for persons of color, such as a barber or butcher. African Americans were never employed at Webb's city in any positions of supervision, power, or decision-making. African Americans made up the bulk of the shoppers at Webb's City, but were not permitted to eat at the lunch counter, or shop in the "ready to wear" or "men's suits" departments.

=== Civil rights and NAACP protests ===
By June 1960, the NAACP and members of the Black community actively picketed and staged sit-ins at Webb's City to protest its racial discrimination. The chief complaints of the leadership of the St. Petersburg NAACP were that Doc Webb did not hire African Americans proportionate to the number of African Americans that spent money shopping at Webb's City and lived in the neighboring community. Out of 1,700 employees, only 150 were African American and none of those employees were allowed positions for advancement within the business. Doc disagreed with the NAACP and began legal proceedings to halt the actions of the St. Petersburg NAACP. On December 7, 1960, Doc successfully stopped NAACP protest actions at Webb's City through a court-ordered temporary restraining order. The NAACP filed a motion to dismiss the order, and Doc Webb continued his legal efforts to keep picketers away from Webb's City, citing his concern for the safety of his employees and that his business had lost a great deal of money because of the NAACP-led protests; a comptroller for Webb's City testified that Doc's business had lost a total of US$13,146. In 1961 Webb's city removed its racial barriers; nevertheless, the court case continued all the way to the U.S. Supreme Court, which reached a final judgment in 1964, determining that the case had been resolved by the lifting of racial barriers. It has been suggested that the Supreme Court would otherwise have sided with the NAACP.

Doc Webb's issues with the NAACP did not end in 1964. In 1968, the NAACP supported a garbage workers' strike in St. Petersburg by picketing and calling for a boycott of downtown St. Petersburg businesses. Webb's City was included in the area of the boycott and picketing. This boycott was not as peaceful as the 1960 pickets; six members of a large group of protesters were arrested at Webb's City for "interfering with business" such as by chanting: "Let's burn it down, we'll start with Webb's." Doc Webb did not pursue a permanent injunction, and peaceful small groups of protesters were not prevented from picketing at Webb's City.

=== Closure ===
The store closed on August 18, 1979. Five years later, in 1984, the building was demolished. The iconic giant mermaid sign now resides at the St. Petersburg Museum of History.
