= Victor Sproles =

American jazz musician

Victor Sproles (November 18, 1927 in Chicago – May 13, 2005) was an American jazz bassist.

Sproles worked in the 1950s with Red Rodney and Ira Sullivan and appears on the Sun Ra recordings Super-Sonic Jazz, Sound of Joy and Deep Purple.

In 1957 he appeared on the Verve recording Stan Meets Chet with Stan Getz and Chet Baker.

In 1960 he joined Johnny Griffin's Big Soul Band and in 1961 played in Muhal Richard Abrams' Experimental Band.

In 1964 he joined Art Blakey's Jazz Messengers, recording the album 'SMake It for Limelight; Lee Morgan and his old Sun Ra bandmate John Gilmore were in the group. He recorded two more albums with the Messengers after Gilmore left.

He subsequently appeared Lee Morgan's Blue Note albums The Rumproller and The Sixth Sense.

In 1974 he played in Clark Terry's big band and appeared on Buddy DeFranco's album Free Fall.

== Discography ==
- 1955: Modern Music from Chicago — Red Rodney with Ira Sullivan (ts, t), Red Rodney (t, v), Norman Simmons (p), Roy Haynes (d)
- 1956: Super-Sonic Jazz — Sun Ra
- 1956: Sound of Joy — Sun Ra
- 1957: Deep Purple [released in 1973] — Sun Ra
- 1958: Stan Meets Chet - Stan Getz with Chet Baker
- 1958: Nicky's Tune — Ira Sullivan (t) with Nicky Hill (ts), Jodie Christian (p), Wilbur Campbell (d)
- 1959: Blue Stroll — Ira Sullivan (as, bar, t, ah) with Johnny Griffin (as, ts, bar), Jodie Christian (p), Wilbur Campbell (d)
- 1960: Eastern Exposure — Fred Kaz
- 1964: 'S Make It — Art Blakey
- 1964: Blues Bag — Buddy DeFranco
- 1965: Are You Real — Art Blakey
- 1965: Soul Finger — Art Blakey and The Jazz Messengers with Lucky Thompson (ss) John Hicks (p), Art Blakey (d)
- 1965: Hold On, I'm Coming - Art Blakey
- 1965: The Rumproller — Lee Morgan (t) with Joe Henderson (ts), Ronnie Mathews (p), Billy Higgins (d)
- 1968: Dance with Death [released in 1980] — Andrew Hill (p) with Joe Farrell (ss,ts), Charles Tolliver (t), Billy Higgins (d)
- 1968: The Sixth Sense — Lee Morgan

With Johnny Griffin

- Battle Stations (Prestige, 1960) — with Eddie "Lockjaw" Davis
- The Big Soul-Band (Riverside, 1960)
- Johnny Griffin’s Studio Jazz Party (Riverside, 1960)

With Larry Willis

- A New Kind of Soul (LLP, 1970)
