= Bill Pierce (saxophonist) =

American jazz musician

Bill Pierce (also Billy Pierce) (born September 25, 1948, in Hampton, Virginia) is an American jazz saxophonist.

He played with Art Blakey and the Jazz Messengers in the early 1980s and in Tony Williams's quintet in the mid-1980s to early 1990s. He also has released numerous CDs for which he is the band leader.

He studied with Joe Viola and Andy McGhee at Berklee College of Music, and with Joe Allard. He is the former chair of the school's woodwind department.

== Discography ==
=== As Leader ===
- Give and Take (Sunnyside, 1988)
- Equilateral (Sunnyside, 1989)
- One for Chuck (Sunnyside, 1991)
- Rolling Monk (Bellaphon, 1993)
- Epistrophy (Evidence, 1995)
- Rio (Ballads and Bossa Novas) (Sunnyside, 1995)
- Complete William the Conqueror Sessions (Sunnyside, 1995)
- Burnin' - with Javon Jackson (Criss Cross Jazz, 1997)

=== As Sideman ===
With Art Blakey and the Jazz Messengers

- Live at Montreux and Northsea (Timeless, 1980)
- Art Blakey in Sweden (Amigo, 1981)
- Album of the Year (Timeless, 1981)
- Straight Ahead (Concord Jazz, 1981)
- Keystone 3 (Concord Jazz, 1982)
- Oh-By the Way (Timeless, 1982)

With Geoff Keezer

- Waiting In The Wings (Sunnyside, 1989)

With Kevin Eubanks

- Zen Food (Mack Avenue 2010)
- The Messenger (Mack Avenue 2013)
- East West Time Line (Mack Avenue, 2017)

With Makoto Ozone

- After (Columbia 1986)

With Superblue

- Superblue (1988, Blue Note)

With John Swana

- Introducing (Criss Cross, 1990)
- John Swana and Friends (Criss Cross, 1991)

With Tony Williams

- Civilization (Blue Note, 1987)
- Angel Street (Blue Note, 1988)
- Native Heart (Blue Note, 1990)
- The Story of Neptune (Blue Note, 1992)
- Tokyo Live (Blue Note, 1992)

With Laszlo Gardony

- Life In Real Time (Sunnyside, 2015)
