= Jack Tracy =

American jazz producer and journalist (1926–2010)

- Born: July 27, 1926; Minneapolis, Minnesota, U.S.
- Origin: Chicago, Illinois, U.S.
- Died: December 21, 2010 (aged 84) Nooksack, Washington, U.S.
- Genres: Jazz
- Occupations: Record producer, music journalist

Jack Tracy (July 27, 1926 in Minneapolis, Minnesota – December 21, 2010 in Nooksack, Washington) was an American jazz producer and journalist.

== Early years ==
Tracy enlisted in the Navy in World War II and served as a medic treating and caring for the returning wounded. When he graduated from the University of Minnesota, love for words and music led him to a job in Chicago at DownBeat magazine, where he was editor from 1953–58.

== Music industry ==
Tracy left the magazine to produce for recordings for the Mercury, Argo, Limelight, and Liberty record labels. In 1959, he worked for record label head Leonard Chess of Chess Records. In 1961, Quincy Jones convinced him to rejoin Mercury as an A&R man in Los Angeles. Artists he worked with included Dizzy Gillespie and Sarah Vaughan, Roland Kirk and Oscar Peterson, Woody Herman, Cannonball Adderley, John Coltrane, Del Close, Harry Nilsson, Mike Nichols, and Elaine May, and Terry Gibbs. In 1963, he collaborated on an anecdotal memoir of jazz humor, Laughter from the Hip.
