= Donald Harrison =

American jazz saxophonist (born 1960)

Donald Harrison Jr
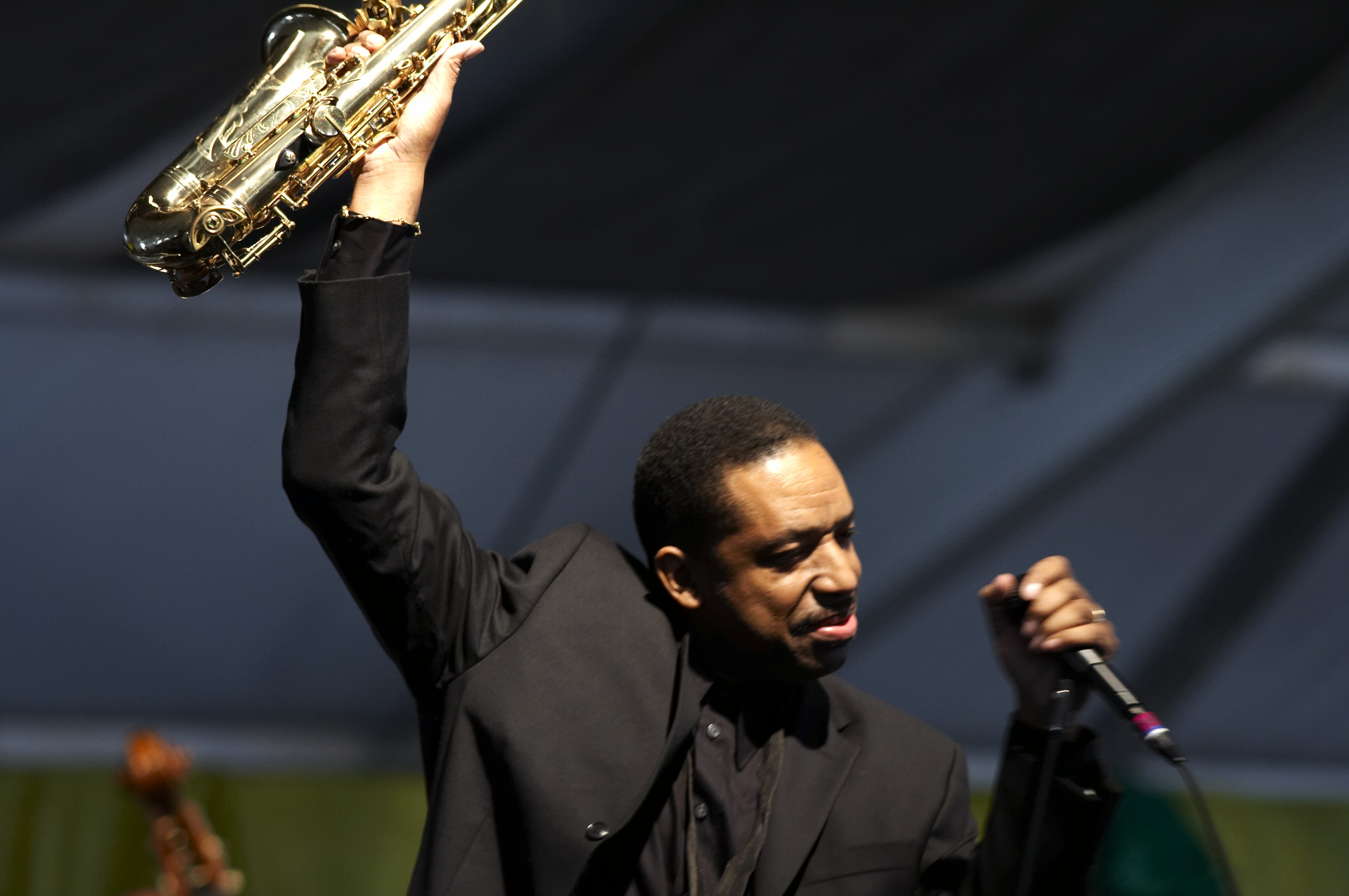
- Donald Harrison Jr. at the New Orleans Jazz Fest 2007

Background information
- Born: June 23, 1960 (age 66); New Orleans, Louisiana, U.S.
- Genres: Jazz; funk; soul; classical (latter as composer)
- Occupation: Musician
- Instrument: Saxophone
- Years active: 1980s–present
- Labels: Concord; Columbia; Candid; Impulse!; Nagel Heyer
- Website: www.donaldharrison.net

Donald Harrison Jr. (born June 23, 1960) is an American jazz saxophonist and the Big Chief of The Congo Square Nation Afro-New Orleans Cultural Group from New Orleans, Louisiana.

He was awarded an Honorary Doctorate by the Berklee College of Music in 2021. He is also an NEA Jazz Master. He is the uncle and former tutor of Chief Xian aTunde Adjuah, also known as Christian Scott aTunde Adjuah.

== Biography ==
Harrison was born to Big Chief Donald Harrison Sr in 1960 in New Orleans, Louisiana.

The foundation of Harrison's music comes from his lifelong participation in New Orleans culture. He started in New Orleans second-line culture and studied New Orleans secret tribal culture, under his father, Big Chief Donald Harrison Sr. He began participating as a masked Mardi Gras Indian at the age of two years, with the title "Little Chief of the Creole Wild West." Whereas, Harrison Jr. is currently the Chief of Congo Square in Afro-New Orleans Culture.

Harrison began playing alto saxophone at the age of 16, and went on to study at the Berklee College of Music.

As a professional musician, Harrison worked with Roy Haynes and Jack McDuff, before joining Art Blakey and the Jazz Messengers with Terence Blanchard and recorded albums in a quintet until 1989. Two years later, Harrison released a tribute album to Blakey, For Art's Sake. This was followed by an album that reached into Harrison's New Orleans heritage, with guest appearances by Dr. John and Cyrus Chestnut and chants by the Guardians of the Flame Mardi Gras Indians. He devoted half the album, Nouveau Swing (1997), to mixing the swing beat of modern acoustic jazz, with modern dance music and half to mixing the swing beat with Caribbean-influenced music. On the next album, his experiments continued by mixing modern jazz's swing beat with hip hop, Latin music, R&B, and smooth jazz.

His albums, 3D Vols. I, II, and III, present him in three different musical genres. On Vol. I he writes, plays, and produces smooth jazz and R&B style. On Vol. II he writes, produces and plays in the classic jazz style. On Vol. III he writes plays and produces hip hop.

His group, Donald Harrison Electric Band, has recorded popular radio hits and has charted in the top ten of Billboard magazine. He performs as a producer, singer, and rapper in traditional New Orleans jazz and hip-hop genres with his group, The New Sounds of Mardi Gras. The group, which has recorded two albums, was started in 2001 and has made appearances worldwide.

In 1999, Harrison was named the Big Chief of the Congo Square Nation Afro-New Orleans Cultural Group, which keeps alive the traditions of Congo Square. Commenting on his choice for the group's name, Harrison has said, "I have a lot of respect for the guys who consider themselves to be Mardi Gras Indians, but I moved into describing what I do culturally in New Orleans to be Afro-New Orleans music from traveling all over the world. Going to places like Cuba and Brazil, they always put Afro in front of things that are from their country but are a derivative of African culture. For instance, Eddie Palmieri always says Afro-Caribbean when describing his music."

In 2013, Harrison began playing with the Cookers, a jazz supergroup whose members include, as of 2024, Billy Harper, Cecil McBee, George Cables, Eddie Henderson, Billy Hart, and David Weiss.

In 2008, he became a patented inventor globally with his Selectable Media concept. His invention offers a new way for listeners to engage with recorded music. He also recorded Quantum Leap Vol. 1, the first in a series of recordings using concepts from quantum mechanics, continuing his idea of recording the same songs in many styles.^{[1]}

In 2010, Harrison released his groundbreaking recording Quantum Leap, in which he used his jazz quartet to create a musical analogy of four-dimensional quantum spacetime, drawing on concepts from relativity.

In 2016, Harrison recorded Congo Square Suite, his first orchestral work with the Moscow Symphony Orchestra. The suite was another example of his multi-genre concept. The first movement was an Afro-New Orleans music chant with percussion and singers. Harrison sang lead over a call-and-response chant, with obligatos woven into the mix. The second movement is a classical orchestral work where Harrison uses his experiences becoming a Big Chief to compose the music. The third movement uses the full orchestra and his jazz quartet to create a concept based on authentic tribal participation. In contrast, the first two movements follow a tribal-then-orchestral template. He followed up the piece for the MSO by writing classical orchestral works for the Thailand Philharmonic Orchestra, the New York Chamber Orchestra, and the Jalapa Symphony Orchestra in 2017.

In 2017, he secured his first trademark for Afro-New Orleans. His other trademarks include Roots To Infinity and Quantum Leap for recording series and music festivals.

In 2024, Harrison released The Art of Passion on ropeadope Records. This work furthered his multi-genre singles concept, featuring one song played three ways as a mirror. One version is an acoustic jazz idea that mixes hip-hop and sixties avant-garde jazz. There is a hip-hop version, and a version that mixes hip-hop and jazz.(14)

In 2026, Harrison released The Magic Touch (multi-genre singles). It is his largest exploration of multi-genre singles and features one song composed, produced, and recorded by Harrison in 10 musical styles. The styles include post-bop, bossa nova, blues, soul, roots reggae, salsa, chill trap hip-hop, New Orleans Second-Line, Afro-Beat, and his signature nouveau swing sound, which blends the first nine into a cohesive modern acoustic jazz version.

Harrison has nurtured many young musicians, including trumpeter Atunde' Adjuah (Christian Scott) (Harrison's nephew), Mark Whitfield, Christian McBride, and The Notorious B.I.G.^{[2]} He has taught at the College of William & Mary, New York's New School of Music, and the Tipitina's Internship Program.^{[3]} He has also served as Artistic Director of the Louis "Satchmo" Armstrong Summer Jazz Camp starting in 2022.^{[3]}

Harrison appeared in Spike Lee's HBO documentary When the Levees Broke and has appeared as himself in eleven episodes of the television series Treme,^{[4]} where two characters were based on his musical accomplishments.

For the 2026 Grammy Awards, he received a nomination for the album The Original Influencers: Dizzy, Chano & Chico Arturo O'Farrill & The Afro Latin Jazz Orchestra in the Best Latin Jazz Album category.

== Personal life ==
He is married to Mary Alicė Spears-Harrison and the father of Victoria Harrison.

== Awards and honors ==
=== National Endowment for the Arts ===
In 2022, the National Endowment for the Arts recognized Harrison with the A.B. Spellman NEA Jazz Masters Fellowship for Jazz Advocacy. Harrison is "known for his hard-swinging improvisational style and the creation of 'Nouveau Swing,' a blend of jazz with R&B, hip-hop, rock, and soul. And his dedication to preserving the music and culture of New Orleans has been crucial to assuring its important legacy survives."

=== OffBeat's Best of The Beat Awards ===
Year	Category	Result	Ref.
2017	Best Saxophonist	Won	
2020	Best Saxophonist	Won	
2021-22	Best Saxophonist	Won	
2023	Best Saxophonist	Won	

=== Other awards ===
Harrison has received two Grand Prix du Disque awards.

Harrison was awarded an Honorary Doctorate by the Berklee College of Music in 2021.

Harrison was chosen Person of the Year by Jazziz magazine in January 2007.

== Discography ==
=== As leader ===
- 1990: Full Circle (Sweet Basil)
- 1991: For Art's Sake (Candid)
- 1992: Indian Blues (Candid) with Dr. John
- 1994: The Power of Cool (CTI)
- 1997: Nouveau Swing (Impulse!)
- 1999: Free to Be (Impulse!)
- 2000: Spirits of Congo Square (Candid)
- 2001: Real Life Stories (Nagel Heyer)
- 2002: Kind of New (Candid)
- 2003: Paradise Found (Fomp)
- 2004: Heroes (Nagel Heyer)
- 2004: Free Style (Nagel Heyer)
- 2005: New York Cool: Live at The Blue Note (Half Note)
- 2005: 3D (FOMP)
- 2006: The Survivor (Nagel Heyer)
- 2008: The Chosen (Nagel Heyer)
- 2010: Quantum Leap (2010)
- 2011: This Is Jazz: Live at The Blue Note (Half Note)
- 2023: Congo Square Suite (TRRCollective)
- 2024: The Art of Passion (ropeadope)
- 2026: The Magic Touch (Roots To Infinity)

As co-leader with Terence Blanchard

- 1983: New York Second Line (Concord)
- 1984: Discernment (Concord)
- 1986: Nascence (Columbia)
- 1986: Eric Dolphy & Booker Little Remembered Live at Sweet Basil, Vol. 1 (Evidence)
- 1986: Fire Waltz: Eric Dolphy & Booker Little Remembered Live At Sweet Basil, Vol. 2 (Evidence)
- 1987: Crystal Stair (Columbia)
- 1988: Black Pearl (Columbia)

=== As sideman ===
With Roy Haynes

- Te-Vou! (Dreyfus, 1994)

With Art Blakey

- Oh-By the Way (Timeless, 1982)
- New York Scene (Concord, 1984)
- Blue Night (Timeless, 1985)
- New Year's Eve at Sweet Basil (Evidence, 1985)

With Joanne Brackeen

- Turnaround (Evidence, 1992)

With The Headhunters

- Evolution Revolution (Basin Street, 2003)
- Speakers In The House (Ropeadope, 2022)

With Eddie Henderson

- Witness to History (Smoke Sessions, 2022)

With the Brian Lynch/Eddie Palmieri Project

- Simpático (ArtistShare, 2007)

With Eddie Palmieri

- Palmas (Elektra Nonesuch, 1995)
- Arete (RMM, 1995)
- Vortex (RMM, 1996)
- Listen Here! (Concord, 2005)
- Wisdom/Sabiduria (Ropeadope, 2017)

With Don Pullen

- The Sixth Sense (Black Saint, 1985)

With Lonnie Smith

- Rise Up! (Palmetto, 2008)

With Esperanza Spalding

- Esperanza (Heads Up, 2008)

With Jane Monheit

- Taking a Chance on Love (Sony Music Entertainment, 2004)

=== On DVD ===
- Live with Clark Terry
- Live at the Supper Club with Lena Horne

With Larry Coryell "Live in Bahia
