= The Jazz Messengers discography =

- Studio albums: 47
- Soundtrack albums: 2
- Live albums: 21
- Compilation albums: 6

The Jazz Messengers were a jazz band that existed with varying personnel for 35 years. Their discography consists of 47 studio albums, 21 live albums, 2 soundtracks, 6 compilations, and one boxed set.

Drummer Art Blakey was the leader or co-leader of the group throughout its existence. He is the drummer on all Jazz Messengers recordings and is therefore elided from personnel listings. Members recorded as either a quintet or sextet except for one 11-piece big band appearance and their expansion to a septet at the end.

The earliest recordings of the original Messengers were on Blue Note Records; all of the original Messengers (except bassist Doug Watkins) had released albums under their own name on the label. Blue Note 1518 was a reissue of two previously released 10" LPs credited to The Horace Silver Quintet.

A few recordings on Columbia Records followed with a couple different formations. As the second Messengers lineup stabilized they recorded for the RCA sub-label Vik Records, interspersed with one-off recordings for Cadet Records, Jubilee Records, and Atlantic.

Starting in 1958, a new lineup with Lee Morgan, Benny Golson, Bobby Timmons, Jymie Merritt, and later Wayne Shorter, Freddie Hubbard, and Curtis Fuller would see the group return to Blue Note for several years. This group also traveled to Europe where a couple albums on Fontana Records appeared. In 1961, there was a single album on Impulse! Records. In 1963 the first of three releases appeared on Riverside Records, while new releases on Blue Note continued to be issued.

After Wayne Shorter departed for Miles Davis's Second Great Quintet, the band signed with Quincy Jones' Mercury sub-label Limelight Records for three more releases starting in 1965.

Except for a 1970 release on the obscure Catalyst, and various bootlegs, the band did not release a recording between 1966 and 1972, when they re-appeared on Prestige Records for three more albums. In 1975 the band released an album with guest artist Sonny Stitt on the Swedish Sonet Records, then came two albums on Roulette Records in 1976 and 1978.

Starting in 1978, the band began to release albums on the Dutch Timeless Records and the Concord Jazz subsidiary of Concord Records. These groups included a changing lineup of young jazz musicians such as: Wynton and Branford Marsalis, Terence Blanchard, Donald Harrison, Wallace Roney, Mulgrew Miller, and Lonnie Plaxico.

Near the end, there were two albums on the Italian Soul Note label, and the final album on A&M Records. The Jazz Messengers came to an end with the death of Blakey in 1990.

== Studio albums ==
Albums are listed in order of earliest recording session. Some albums were not released for many years after their recording. The formats listed are the formats issued at the original release date. Most of the albums have been reissued on compact disc, many with additional tracks. Some albums have also been reissued or repackaged on varying labels and formats. See the specific album articles for reissue information.

Album	Album Details	Personnel	Notes
The Jazz Messengers	Released: 1956; Recorded: April 5, and May 4, 1956; Label: Columbia (CL 897); Format: LP	Donald Byrd – trumpet; Hank Mobley – tenor saxophone; Horace Silver – piano; Doug Watkins – double bass	
Hard Bop	Released: 1957; Recorded: December 12 and 13, 1956; Label: Columbia (CL 1040); Format: LP	Bill Hardman – trumpet; Jackie McLean – alto saxophone; Sam Dockery – piano; Jimmy "Spanky" DeBrest – double bass	
Ritual	Released: 1957; Recorded: January 14 and February 11, 1957; Label: Pacific Jazz (PJM-402); Format: LP	Hardman; McLean; Dockery; DeBrest	The liner notes state that Pacific Jazz got this record in exchange for Columbia getting a record by Chet Baker.
Tough!	Released: 1966; Recorded: Spring, 1957; Label: Cadet (4049); Format: LP	Hardman; McLean; Dockery; DeBrest	
Selections from Lerner and Loewe's...	Released: 1957; Recorded: March 13, 1957; Label: Vik Records (1103); Format: LP	Hardman; Johnny Griffin – tenor saxophone; Dockery; DeBrest	
A Night in Tunisia	Released: 1957; Recorded: April 8, 1957; Label: Vik Records (1115); Format: LP	Hardman; McLean; Griffin; Dockery; DeBrest	Jackie McLean is credited as "Ferris Benda."
Cu-Bop	Released: 1957; Recorded: May 13, 1957; Label: Jubilee (1049); Format: LP	Hardman; Griffin; Dockery; DeBrest; Guest: Sabu	
Art Blakey's Jazz Messengers with Thelonious Monk	Released: 1958; Recorded: May 14 and 15, 1957; Label: Atlantic (LP 1278 [Mono], SD 1278 [Stereo]); Format: LP	Hardman; Griffin; DeBrest; Guest: Thelonious Monk – piano	
Hard Drive	Released: 1957; Recorded: August 9 and 11, 1957; Label: Bethlehem (6023); Format: LP	August 9: Hardman, Griffin, Dockery, DeBrest; August 11: Hardman, Griffin, Junior Mance – piano, DeBrest	
Moanin'	Released: 1959; Recorded: October 30, 1958; Label: Blue Note (BLP 4003 [Mono], BST 4003 [Stereo]); Format: LP	Lee Morgan – trumpet; Benny Golson – tenor saxophone; Bobby Timmons – piano; Jymie Merritt – double bass	Though known as Moanin', the album was officially released as Art Blakey and the Jazz Messengers.
The Big Beat	Released: 1960; Recorded: March 3, 1960; Label: Blue Note (BLP 4029 [Mono], BST 84029 [Stereo]); Format: LP; Format: LP	Morgan; Wayne Shorter – tenor saxophone; Timmons – piano; Merritt	Bobby Timmons returns to the Messengers, after a short engagement with Cannonball Adderley.
Like Someone in Love	Released: 1966; Recorded: August 7 and 14, 1960; Label: Blue Note (BLP 4245 [Mono], BST 84245 [Stereo]); Format: LP	Morgan; Shorter; Timmons; Merritt	
A Night in Tunisia	Released: 1960; Recorded: August 7 and 14, 1960; Label: Blue Note (BLP 4049 [Mono], BST 84049 [Stereo]); Format: LP	Morgan; Shorter; Timmons; Merritt	
The Freedom Rider	Released: 1962; Recorded: February 18 and May 27, 1961; Label: Blue Note (BLP 4156 [Mono], BST 84156 [Stereo]); Format: LP	Morgan; Shorter; Timmons; Merritt	
Roots & Herbs	Released: 1970; Recorded: February 18 and May 27, 1961; Label: Blue Note (BST 84347); Format: LP	Morgan; Shorter; Timmons; Walter Davis, Jr. – piano; Merritt	
The Witch Doctor	Released: 1967; Recorded: March 14, 1961; Label: Blue Note (BST 84258); Format: LP	Morgan; Shorter; Timmons; Merritt	
Art Blakey and the Jazz Messengers	Released: 1961; Recorded: June 13 and 14, 1961; Label: Impulse! (A-7); Format: LP	Morgan; Curtis Fuller – trombone; Shorter; Timmons; Merritt	
Mosaic	Released 1962; Recorded: October 2, 1961; Label: Blue Note (BLP 4090 [Mono], BST 84090 [Stereo]); Format: LP	Freddie Hubbard – trumpet; Fuller; Shorter; Cedar Walton – piano; Merritt	
Buhaina's Delight	Released: 1963; Recorded: November 28 and December 18, 1961; Label: Blue Note (BLP 4104 [Mono], BST 84104 [Stereo]); Format: LP	Hubbard; Fuller; Shorter; Walton; Merritt	
Caravan	Released: 1963; Recorded: October 23 and 24, 1962; Label: Riverside (RLP 438 [Mono], RS 8438 [Stereo]); Format: LP	Hubbard; Fuller; Shorter; Walton; Reggie Workman – double bass	
Golden Boy	Released: 1963; Recorded: 1963; Label: Colpix (CP 478 [Mono], SCP 478 [Stereo]); Format: LP	Morgan; Hubbard; Fuller; Shorter; Walton; Workman; Guests: Julius Watkins – French horn; Bill Barber – tuba; James Spaulding – alto saxophone; Charles Davis – baritone saxophone	
Free for All	Released: 1964; Recorded: February 10, 1964; Label: Blue Note (BLP 4170 [Mono], BST 84170 [Stereo]); Format: LP	Hubbard; Fuller; Shorter; Walton; Workman	
Kyoto	Released: 1964; Recorded: February 20, 1964; Label: Riverside (RLP 493 [Mono], RS 9493 [Stereo]); Format: LP	Hubbard; Fuller; Shorter; Walton; Workman; Guest: Wellington Blakey – vocals	
Indestructible	Released: 1965; Recorded: April 24 and May 15, 1964; Label: Blue Note (BLP 4192 [Mono], BST 84193 [Stereo]); Format: LP	Lee Morgan – trumpet; Fuller; Shorter; Walton; Workman	
'S Make It	Released: 1965; Recorded: November 14, 16 and 25, 1964; Label: Limelight (LM 82001 [Mono], LS 86001 [Stereo]); Format: LP	Morgan; Fuller; John Gilmore – tenor saxophone; John Hicks – piano; Victor Sproles – double bass	
Soul Finger	Released: 1965; Recorded: April 21 and May 12 and 13, 1965; Label: Limelight (LM 82018 [Mono] LS 86018 [Stereo]); Format: LP	Morgan; Freddie Hubbard – trumpet; Gary Bartz – alto saxophone; Hicks; Sproles; Guest: Lucky Thompson – soprano saxophone	
Child's Dance	Released: 1972; Recorded: May 23 and July 28, 1972; Label: Prestige (P 10047); Format: LP	May 23: Ramon Morris – flute; Buddy Terry – soprano saxophone; John Hicks – electric piano; Mickey Bass – double bass; Emanuel Rahim – conga; Nataniel Bettis – percussion; Richie "Pablo" Landrum – percussion; Sonny Morgan – percussion; July 28: Woody Shaw – trumpet; Manny Boyd – flute; Ramon Morris – tenor saxophone; George Cables – piano, electric piano; Stanley Clarke – electric bass; Ray Mantilla – conga	
Buhaina	Released: 1973; Recorded: March 26–29, 1973; Label: Prestige (P 10067); Format: LP	Shaw; Carter Jefferson – tenor and soprano saxophone; Cedar Walton – piano, electric piano; Bass; Tony Waters – conga; Guests: Jon Hendricks – vocals; Michael Howell – guitar	
Anthenagin	Released: 1973; Recorded: March 26–29, 1973; Label: Prestige (P 10076); Format: LP	Shaw; Jefferson; Walton; Bass; Waters; Guests: Michael Howell – guitar; Steve Turre – trombone	Steve Turre is listed as "Steve Turley" on the album.
In Walked Sonny	Released: 1975; Recorded: May 16, 1975; Label Sonet (SNTF 691); Format: LP	Bill Hardman – trumpet; David Schnitter – tenor saxophone; Walter Davis, Jr. – piano; "Chin" Suzuki – double bass; Guest: Sonny Stitt – tenor and alto saxophone	
Backgammon	Released: 1976; Recorded: March 15 and 16, 1976; Label: Roulette (SR 5003); Format: LP	Hardman; Schnitter; Al Dailey – piano; Suzuki; Guest: Ladji Camara – flute, vocals	
Gypsy Folk Tales	Released: 1977; Recorded: February 12, 17, 28 and March 1, 1977; Label: Roulette (SR 5008); Format: LP	Valery Ponomarev – trumpet; Bobby Watson – alto saxophone; Schnitter; Walter Davis, Jr. – piano; Dennis Irwin – double bass	
In My Prime Vol. 1	Released: 1978; Recorded: December 29, 1977; Label: Timeless (SJP 114); Format: LP	Ponomarev; Curtis Fuller – trombone; Watson; Schnitter; James Williams – piano; Irwin; Ray Mantilla – percussion	
In My Prime Vol. 2	Released: 1978; Recorded: December 30, 1977; Label: Timeless (SJP 118); Format: LP	Ponomarev; Fuller; Watson; Schnitter; Williams; Irwin; Mantilla	
Reflections in Blue	Released: 1979; Recorded: December 4, 1978; Label: Timeless (SJP 128); Format: LP	Ponomarev; Watson; Schnitter; Williams; Irwin	
Night in Tunisia: Digital Recording	Released: 1979; Recorded: February 12, 1979; Label: Philips (6385 943); Format: LP	Ponomarev; Watson; Schnitter; Williams; Irwin	
Album of the Year	Released: 1981; Recorded: April 12, 1981; Label: Timeless (SJP 155); Format: LP	Wynton Marsalis – trumpet; Watson; Bill Pierce – tenor saxophone; Williams; Charles Fambrough – double bass	
Oh-By the Way	Released: 1982; Recorded: May 20, 1982; Label: Timeless (SJP 165); Format: LP	Terence Blanchard – trumpet; Donald Harrison – alto saxophone; Pierce; Johnny O'Neal – piano; Fambrough	
New York Scene	Released: 1984; Recorded: May, 1984; Label: Concord Jazz (CJ 256); Format: LP	Blanchard; Harrison; Jean Toussaint – tenor saxophone; Mulgrew Miller – piano; Lonnie Plaxico – double bass	
Blue Night	Released: 1985; Recorded: March 17, 1985; Label: Timeless (SJP 217); Format: LP, CD	Blanchard; Harrison; Toussaint; Miller; Plaxico	
Feeling Good	Released: 1986; Recorded: September 8 and 9, 1986; Label: Delos (D/CD 4007); Format: CD	Wallace Roney – trumpet; Tim Williams – trombone; Kenny Garrett – alto saxophone; Toussaint; Donald Brown – piano; Peter Washington – double bass	
Not Yet	Released: 1988; Recorded: March 19, 1988; Label: Soul Note (SN 1105); Format: LP, CD	Philip Harper – trumpet; Robin Eubanks – trombone; Javon Jackson – tenor saxophone; Benny Green – piano; Washington	
I Get a Kick Out of Bu	Released: 1988; Recorded: November 11, 1988; Label: Soul Note (SN 1155); Format: LP, CD	Harper; R. Eubanks; Jackson; Green; Leon Lee Dorsey – double bass	
Chippin' In	Released: 1990; Recorded: February 1 and 2, 1990; Label: Timeless (SJP 340); Format: CD, LP	Bryan Lynch – trumpet; Steve Davis – trombone; Frank Lacy – trombone; Dale Barlow – tenor saxophone; Jackson; Geoff Keezer – piano; Essiet Okon Essiet – double bass	
One for All	Released: 1990; Recorded: April 10 and 11, 1990; Label: A&M (75021 5329–2); Format: CD	Lynch; Davis; Barlow; Jackson; Keezer; Essiet	

== Live albums ==
Album	Album Details	Personnel	Venue
At the Cafe Bohemia, Vol. 1	Released: 1956; Recorded: November 23, 1955; Label: Blue Note (BLP 1507); Format: LP	Kenny Dorham – trumpet; Hank Mobley – tenor saxophone; Horace Silver – piano; Doug Watkins – double bass	Café Bohemia, New York City
At the Cafe Bohemia, Vol. 2	Released: 1956; Recorded: November 23, 1955; Label: Blue Note (BLP 1508); Format: LP	Dorham; Mobley; Silver; Watkins	Café Bohemia, NYC
A Midnight Session with the Jazz Messengers	Released: 1957; Recorded: March 8 and 9, 1957; Label: Elektra (ELK 120); Format: LP	Bill Hardman – trumpet; Jackie McLean – alto saxophone; Sam Dockery – piano; Jimmy "Spanky" DeBrest – double bass	Carl Fischer Concert Hall, NYC
1958 – Paris Olympia	Released: 1959; Recorded: November 22 and December 17, 1958; Label: Fontana (680 202); Format: LP	Lee Morgan – trumpet; Benny Golson – tenor saxophone; Bobby Timmons – piano; Jymie Merritt – double bass	Olympia, Paris, France
Art Blakey et les Jazz-Messengers au club St. Germain	Released: 1959; Recorded: December 21, 1958; Label: RCA (France) (430.043); Format: LP	Lee Morgan – trumpet; Benny Golson – tenor saxophone; Bobby Timmons – piano; Jymie Merritt – double bass	Club Saint-Germain, Paris, France
At the Jazz Corner of the World, Vols. 1 & 2	Released: 1959; Recorded: April 15, 1959; Label: Blue Note (BLP 4015, BLP 4016 [Mono]; BST 84014, BST 84016 [Stereo]); Format: LP	Morgan; Hank Mobley – tenor saxophone; Timmons; Merritt	Birdland, NYC
Art Blakey et les Jazz Messengers au Théâtre des Champs-Élysées	Released: 1960; Recorded: November 15, 1959; Label: RCA (France) (430.054); Format: LP	Morgan; Wayne Shorter – tenor saxophone; Walter Davis, Jr. – piano; Merritt	Théâtre des Champs-Élysées, Paris, France
Paris Jam Session	Released: 1960; Recorded: December 18, 1959; Label: Fontana (680 207); Format: LP	Morgan; Wayne Shorter – tenor saxophone; Walter Davis, Jr. – piano; Merritt; Guests: Barney Wilen – alto saxophone; Bud Powell – piano	Théâtre des Champs-Élysées, Paris, France
Meet You at the Jazz Corner of the World, Vols. 1 and 2	Released: 1961; Recorded: September 14, 1960; Label: Blue Note (BLP 4054, BLP 4055 [Mono]; BST 84054, BST 84055 [Stereo]); Format: LP	Morgan; Shorter; Bobby Timmons – piano; Merritt	Birdland, NYC
First Flight to Tokyo	Released: 2021 (November 5); Recorded: January 14, 1961; Label: Blue Note; Format: LP/CD	Morgan; Shorter; Bobby Timmons – piano; Merritt	Hibiya Public Hall, Tokyo, Japan
Three Blind Mice	Released: 1962; Recorded: March 18, 1962; Label: United Artists (UAJ 14002 [Mono], UAJS 15002 [Stereo]); Format: LP	Freddie Hubbard – trumpet; Curtis Fuller – trombone; Shorter; Cedar Walton – piano; Merritt	The Renaissance Club, Hollywood, CA
Ugetsu	Released: 1963; Recorded: June 16, 1963; Label: Riverside (RLP 464 [Mono], RS 9464 [Stereo]); Format: LP	Hubbard; Fuller; Shorter; Walton; Reggie Workman – double bass	Birdland, NYC
Buttercorn Lady	Released: 1966; Recorded: January 1 and 9, 1966; Label: Limelight (LM 82034 [Mono] LS 86034 [Stereo]); Format: LP	Chuck Mangione – trumpet; Frank Mitchell – tenor saxophone; Keith Jarrett – piano; Reggie Johnson – double bass	Lighthouse, Hermosa Beach, CA
Jazz Messengers '70	Released: 1970; Recorded: February 19, 1970; Label: Catalyst (CAT 7902); Format: LP	Bill Hardman – trumpet; Carlos Garnett – tenor saxophone; Joanne Brackeen – piano; Jan Arnet – double bass	Victor Studio 1, Tokyo, Japan
In This Korner	Released: 1978; Recorded: May 8, 1978; Label: Concord Jazz (CJ 68); Format: LP	Valery Ponomarev – trumpet; Bobby Watson – alto saxophone; David Schnitter – tenor saxophone; James Williams – piano; Dennis Irwin – double bass	Keystone Korner, San Francisco
One by One	Released: 1981; Recorded: November 4, 1979; Label: Palcoscenico (15005); Format: LP	Ponomarev; Watson; Schnitter; Williams; Irwin	CIAK, Milan, Italy
Live at Montreux and Northsea	Released: 1980; Recorded: July 13 and 17, 1980; Label: Timeless (SJP 150); Format: LP	Ponomarev; Wynton Marsalis – trumpet; Robin Eubanks – trombone; Watson; Bill Pierce – tenor sax; Branford Marsalis – alto and baritone sax; Williams; Kevin Eubanks – guitar; Charles Fambrough – double bass; John Ramsay – drums	Montreux Jazz Festival, Switzerland & North Sea Jazz Festival, The Netherlands
Art Blakey in Sweden	Released: 1981; Recorded: March 9, 1981; Label: Amigo (AMPL 839); Format: LP	W. Marsalis; Watson; Pierce; Williams; Fambrough	Södra Teatern, Stockholm, Sweden
Straight Ahead	Released: 1981; Recorded: June, 1981; Label: Concord Jazz (CJ 168, CCD 4168); Format: LP	W. Marsalis; Watson; Pierce; Williams; Fambrough	Keystone Korner, San Francisco
Keystone 3	Released: 1982; Recorded: January, 1982; Label: Concord Jazz (CJ 196 CCD 4196); Format: LP	W. Marsalis; Branford Marsalis – alto saxophone; Pierce; Donald Brown – piano; Fambrough	Keystone Korner, San Francisco
Live at Ronnie Scott's 1985	Released: 2000; Recorded: February 18, 1985; Label: BBC Legends (BBCJ 7003–2); Format: CD	Terence Blanchard – trumpet; Donald Harrison – alto saxophone; Jean Toussaint – tenor saxophone; Mulgrew Miller – piano; Lonnie Plaxico – double bass	Ronnie Scott's Jazz Club, London, UK
Live at Ronnie Scott's	Released: 1985; Recorded: February 25, 1985; Label: DRG (91444); Format: CD	Blanchard; Harrison; Toussaint; Miller; Plaxico	Ronnie Scott's Jazz Club, London, UK
Live at Sweet Basil	Recorded: March 24, 1985; Label: Paddle Wheel; Format: CD	Blanchard; Harrison; Toussaint; Miller; Plaxico	Sweet Basil Jazz Club, NYC
Live at Kimball's	Released: 1985; Recorded: April 13, 1985; Label: Concord Jazz (CJ 307, CCD 4307); Format: LP, CD, CS	Blanchard; Harrison; Toussaint; Miller; Plaxico	Kimball's, San Francisco
The Art of Jazz: Live in Leverkusen	Released: 1989; Recorded: October 9, 1989; Label: IN+OUT (77028–2); Format: CD	Brian Lynch – trumpet; Frank Lacy – trombone; Donald Harrison – alto saxophone; Javon Jackson – tenor saxophone; Geoff Keezer – piano; Essiet Okon Essiet – double bass	Leverkusen Jazz Festival, Germany
Swiss Radio Days Jazz Series, Vol. 6: Lausanne 1960, 2nd Set	Released: 1996; Recorded: December 8, 1960; Label: TCB Records (TCB 02062); Format: CD	Morgan – trumpet; Shorter – tenor saxophone; Timmons – piano; Merritt – double bass	Théâtre de Beaulieu, Lausanne, Switzerland

== Soundtracks ==
Album	Album Details	Personnel	Notes
Des Femmes Disparaissent	Released: 1959; Recorded: December 18 and 19, 1958; Label: Fontana (660 224); Format: LP	Lee Morgan – trumpet; Benny Golson – tenor saxophone; Bobby Timmons – piano; Jymie Merritt – double bass	
Les liaisons dangereuses 1960	Released: 1960; Recorded: July 25 and 29, 1959; Label: Fontana (680 203); Format: LP	Morgan; Timmons; Merritt; Guests: Barney Wilen – tenor saxophone; Duke Jordan – piano; Tommy Lopez and Willie Rodriguez – conga; Johnny Rodriguez – bongos	

== Compilation albums ==
Album	Album Details	Personnel	Notes
Horace Silver and the Jazz Messengers	Released: 1956; Recorded: December 13, 1954 and February 6, 1955; Label: Blue Note (BLP 1518); Format: LP	Kenny Dorham – trumpet; Hank Mobley – tenor saxophone; Horace Silver – piano; Doug Watkins – double bass	This album is a reissue of two Blue Note 10" records, numbers 5058 and 5062; Horace Silver Quintet Vols. 1 & 2.
The Cool Voice of Rita Reys	Released: 1956; Recorded: May 3, and June 25, 1956; Label: Columbia (CL 903); Format: LP	May 5: Donald Byrd – trumpet; Mobley; Silver; Watkins; June 25: Byrd; Ira Sullivan – tenor saxophone; Kenny Drew – piano; Wilbur Ware – double bass	Jazz Messengers back up Rita Reys for half of this record.
The Complete Blue Note Recordings of Art Blakey's 1960 Jazz Messengers	Released 1992; Label: Mosaic Records; Format: 6 CDs or 10 LPs	Wayne Shorter (ts); Lee Morgan (tp); Bobby Timmons (p); Jymie Merritt (b); Art Blakey (d)	
Originally	Released: 1982; Recorded: April 5, May 4, June 25, December 12, 1956; Label: Columbia (FC 38036); Format: LP	April 5 and May 4: Byrd, Mobley, Silver, Watkins; June 25: Byrd, Sullivan, Drew, Ware; December 12: Hardman, McLean, Dockery DeBrest	
Drum Suite	Released: 1957; Recorded: December 13, 1956; Label: Columbia (CL 1002); Format: LP	Hardman; McLean; Dockery; DeBrest	Side 1 is the Art Blakey Percussion Ensemble, recorded February 22, 1957, side two is the Jazz Messengers, credited separately, in the notes.
Art Blakey and the Jazz Messengers\The Elmo Hope Quintet Featuring Harold Land	Released: 1957; Recorded: January 14 and February 11, 1957; Label: Pacific Jazz (PJ-33); Format: LP	Bill Hardman – trumpet; Jackie McLean – alto saxophone; Sam Dockery – piano; Jimmy "Spanky" DeBrest – double bass	Split record with Elmo Hope. Additional tracks from PJM-402.
Just Coolin'	Released: April 24, 2020; Recorded: March 8, 1959; Label: Blue Note; Format LP, CD, digital download	Morgan; Hank Mobley – tenor saxophone; Timmons – piano; Merritt	Shelved because the content is similar to At the Jazz Corner of the World
Africaine	Released: 1981; Recorded: October 10, 1959; Label: Blue Note (LT 1088); Format: LP	Morgan; Wayne Shorter – tenor saxophone; Walter Davis, Jr. – piano; Merritt; Guest: Dizzy Reece – conga	
Pisces	Released: 1979; Recorded: February 12 and May 27, 1961, and April 15, 1964; Label: King (Japan) (GFX-3060); Format: LP	February 12 and May 27, 1961: Morgan, Shorter, Timmons, Merritt; April 15, 1964: Morgan, Shorter, Fuller, Walton, Workman	
Live Messengers	Released: 1978; Recorded: August 17, 1961 and March 8, 1962; Label: Blue Note (BN-LA472-J2); Format: LP	Freddie Hubbard – trumpet; Curtis Fuller – trombone; Wayne Shorter – tenor saxophone; Cedar Walton – piano; Jymie Merritt – double bass	This 2 record set also contains previously unreleased tracks from the proto-Messengers A Night at Birdland featuring Clifford Brown from February 12, 1954.
