= Jazz Messages =

Studio album by Art Blakey, Clifford Brown
- Released: 1957
- Genre: Jazz
- Label: Jazztone

Jazz Messages is a 1957 LP re-issue and compilation of tracks by (i) the Clifford Brown Ensemble and (ii) The Jazz Messengers with Art Blakey. It was released on Jazztone Records (catalog #J-1281).

== Comments ==
"Ritual" – For the purpose of improving his art, Blakey, in 1947, worked his way over to Nigeria on a ship, and, while there, visited, Ghana. He stayed for a little over a year. Later, in the New York Jazz scene, Blakey became influential in raising awareness of African-based percussion. Among other things, he composed "Ritual" out of inspiration from his experiences in Africa. Jazz critic Norman Weinstein opined that "Ritual" was one of several projects where Blakey showed an interest in African diasporic musical connections, expressed in "quasi-Afro-Cuban and Afro-Caribbean terms."

"Daahoud," sometimes spelled "Dawud," means "David" in Arabic. Brown named the composition after Talib Dawud, a trumpet-playing acquaintance – with Dizzy and Lee Morgan – in Philadelphia from the early 1950s.

Brown, on June 26, 1954, married LaRue Anderson (maiden; 1933–2005). (Note: Brown and Anderson had three marriage celebrations, partly because their families were on opposite coasts and partly because of their differing religions – Brown was Methodist and Anderson was Catholic. They were first married on June 26, 1954, in Los Angeles (on Anderson's 21st birthday), then again in a religious ceremony on July 17, 1954, in Los Angeles, then, Anderson's parish priest followed them to Boston, and, on August 1, 1954, performed their marriage ceremony at Saint Richards Church in the Roxbury neighborhood. ("Clifford Brown in Los Angeles," by Eddie Spencer Meadows, PhD; born 1939; Black Music Research Journal, published by the Center for Black Music Research, Columbia College Chicago and University of Illinois Press, Vol. 31, No. 1, Spring 2011, pps. 45–63; JSTOR www.jstor.org/stable/10.5406/blacmusiresej.31.1.0045; OCLC 729620529, 6733333114, 778359559; ISSN 0276-3605)) He called her "Joy Spring," and, in her honor, composed a piece in her name in 1954. They had been introduced by Max Roach.

== Track listing ==
Jazztone re-issue

Jazz Messages (album art: Roy Doty; liner notes: George T. Simon) Side 1: Clifford Brown's All Stars
No.	Title	Writer(s)	Length
1.	"Gone with the Wind" (recorded September 8, 1954)	Allie Wrubel	3:37
2.	"Tiny Capers" (recorded September 8, 1954)	Clifford Brown	4:13
3.	"Joy Spring" (recorded August 12, 1954)	Clifford Brown	3:13
4.	"Blueberry Hill" (recorded September 8, 1954)	Vincent Rose	3:13
5.	"Daahoud" (recorded August 12, 1954)	Clifford Brown	4:11

Side 2: The Jazz Messengers with Art Blakey
No.	Title	Writer(s)	Length
1.	"Once Upon a Groove" (recorded January 14, 1957, New York)	Owen Eugene Marshall	8:36
2.	"Touche" (recorded January 14, 1957, New York)	Mal Waldron	6:16
3.	"Blakey's comments on 'Ritual'" (Blakey; February 11, 1957, New York)	Blakey	1:55
4.	"Ritual" (recorded February 11, 1957, New York)	Art Blakey	9:59

––––––––––––––––––––

Matrix – Side 1 (printed on label): HO-8P-0788
Matrix – Side 2 (printed on label): HO-8P-0789

––––––––––––––––––––

Original releases

1) Pacific Jazz Presents the Clifford Brown Ensemble (originally released in 1955 by Pacific Jazz; OCLC 12149539; the August 12 and September 8 sessions were at Capitol Records "A," Los Angeles; all compositions arranged by Jack Montrose) Side A:
No.	Title	Writer(s)	Length
1.	"Gone with the Wind" (recorded September 8, 1954)	Allie Wrubel	3:37
2.	"Joy Spring" (recorded August 12, 1954)	Clifford Brown	3:13
3.	"Finders Keepers" (recorded August 12, 1954)	Jack Montrose	3:49
4.	"Blueberry Hill" (recorded September 8, 1954)	Vincent Rose	3:13

Side B:
No.	Title	Writer(s)	Length
1.	"Tiny Capers" (recorded September 8, 1954)	Clifford Brown	4:13
2.	"Bones for Jones" (tecorded September 8, 1954)	Clifford Brown	4:13
3.	"Daahoud" (recorded August 12, 1954)	Clifford Brown	4:11

Personnel

- Clifford Brown – trumpet
- Stu Williamson – valve trombone
- Zoot Sims – tenor sax
- Bob Gordon – bari sax
- Russ Freeman – piano
- Joe Mondragon – bass (August 12 session)
- Carson Smith – bass (September 8 session)
- Shelly Manne – drums

2) Ritual: The Modern Jazz Messengers (recorded January 14, 1957, New York; selections used for the release of Jazz Messages)
No.	Title	Writer(s)	Length
1.	"Once Upon a Groove" (recorded January 14, 1957, New York)	Owen Eugene Marshall	8:36
2.	"Touche" (recorded January 14, 1957, New York)	Mal Waldron	6:16
3.	"Ritual" (recorded February 11, 1957, New York)	Art Blakey	9:59

== Personnel ==
- Jackie McLean – alto sax
- Bill Hardman – trumpet
- Sam Dockery – piano
- Spanky DeBrest – bass
- Art Blakey – drums

== Additional reading ==
- Clifford Brown: The Life and Art of the Legendary Jazz Trumpeter, by Nick Catalano, Oxford University Press (2000; paperback 2001), p. 129; OCLC 48236845
