= Art Blakey discography =

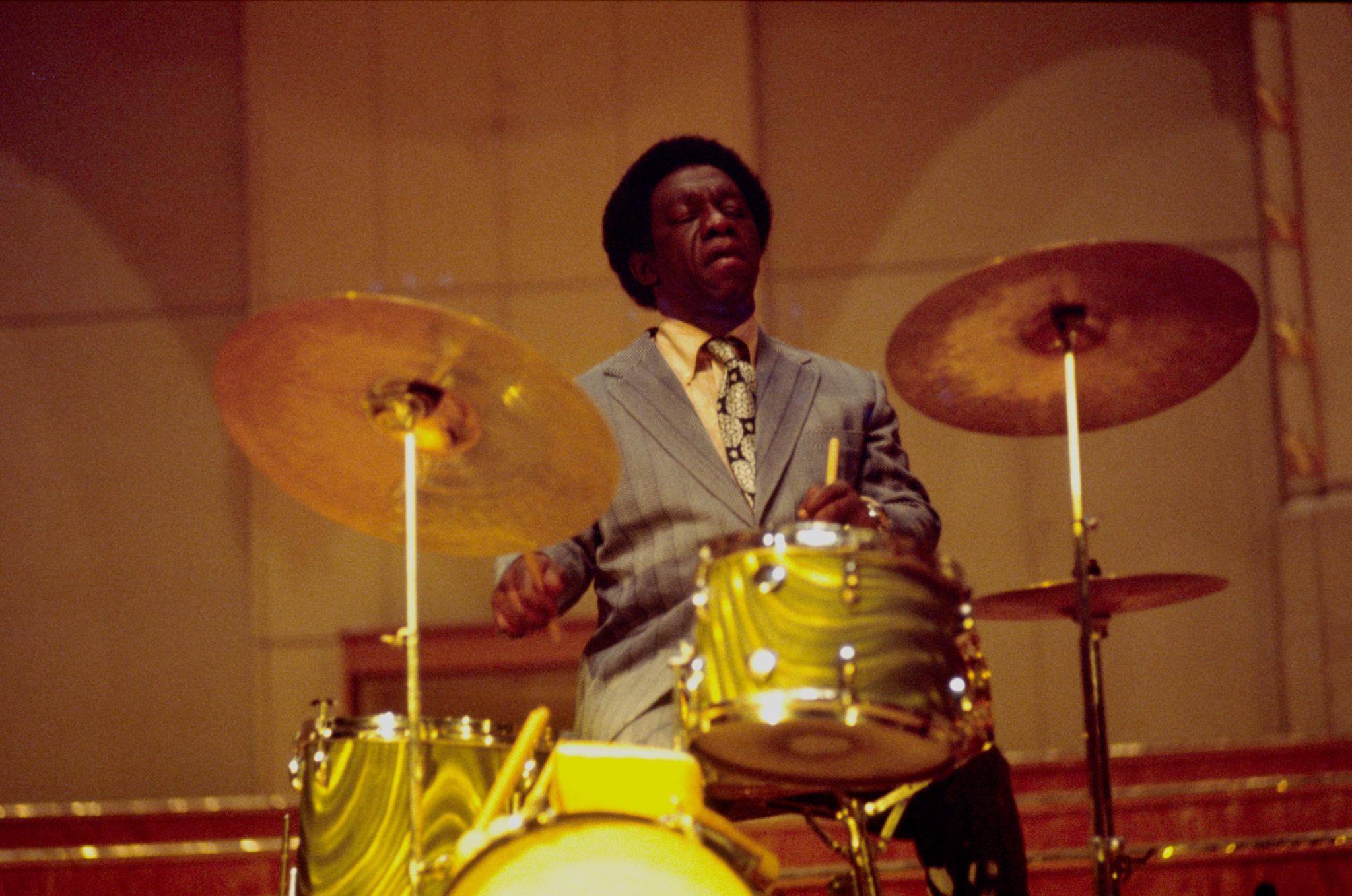
- Blakey touring in 1973 as part of The Giants of Jazz bill in the Musikhalle Hamburg
- Studio albums: 10
- Live albums: 3
- Compilation albums: 4
- Jazz Messengers: 76

Art Blakey was an American jazz drummer and bandleader. "Art Blakey" and "Jazz Messengers" became synonymous over the years, though Blakey led many non-Messenger recording sessions. In addition to the 76 albums which he recorded as a leader or co-leader of the Jazz Messengers, Blakey also led 10 studio albums, 3 live albums and 4 compilation sessions. A relentless performer, he continued to record as a sideman on dozens of albums, throughout his career—frequently for Messengers alumni. He also led several percussion-centric albums with many of his peers.

== Studio albums ==
Album	Album details
Blakey	Released: 1954; Recorded: May 20, 1954; Label: Emarcy (MG 26030); Format: 10" LP
Orgy in Rhythm, Vols. 1 & 2	Released: 1957; Recorded: March 7, 1957; Label: Blue Note (BLP 1554 [Mono], BST 1554 [Stereo]; BLP 1555); Format: LP
Art Blakey Big Band	Released: 1958; Recorded: December, 1957; Label: Bethlehem (BCP 6027); Format: LP
Holiday for Skins, Vols. 1 & 2	Released: 1959; Recorded: November 8, 1958; Label: Blue Note (BLP 4004, BLP 4005); Format: LP
The African Beat	Released: November 1962; Recorded: January 24, 1962; Label: Blue Note (BLP 4097 [Mono], BST 84097 [Stereo]); Format: LP
A Jazz Message	Released: October 1963; Recorded: July 16, 1963; Label: Impulse! (A 45); Format: LP
Hold On, I'm Coming	Released: 1966; Recorded: May 12 and May 27, 1966; Label: Limelight (LM 82038); Format: LP
Killer Joe	with George Kawaguchi: Released: 1982; Recorded: December 4, 1981; Label: Union Jazz (ULP 5001); Format: LP
Feel the Wind	with Freddie Hubbard: Released: 1989; Recorded: October 31 & November 1, 1988; Label: Timeless (SJP 307); Format: LP/CD
Bluesiana Triangle	Released: 1990; Recorded: March, 1990; Label: Windham Hill Jazz (WD 0125); Format: CD
Just Coolin'	Released: July 17, 2020; Recorded: March 8, 1959; Label: Blue Note (64201); Format: CD, Vinyl LP

== Live albums ==
Album	Album details
A Night at Birdland, Vols. 1–3	Released: June, October, November 1954; Recorded: February 21, 1954; Label: Blue Note (BLP 5037, BLP 5038, BLP 5039); Format: 10" LP
A Night at Birdland, Vols. 1 & 2	Released: 1956; Recorded: February 21, 1954; Label: Blue Note (BLP 1521, BLP 1522); Format: LP
A Night at Birdland, Vol. 3	Released: 1984; Recorded: February 21, 1954; Label: Toshiba; Format: LP

== Compilation albums ==
Album	Album details	Notes
New Sounds	Released: 1952; Recorded: December 22, 1947; Label: Blue Note (BLP 5010); Format: 10" LP	
Horace Silver Trio, Vol. 2/Art Blakey-Sabu – Spotlight On Drums	Released: 1954; Recorded: November 23, 1953; Label: Blue Note (BLP 5034); Format: 10" LP	Blakey and Sabu collaborated on two songs on this LP, which is filled out with the Horace Silver Trio, also including Blakey. Reissued on 12" LP BLP 1520.
Live Messengers	Released: 1978; Recorded: February 21, 1954; Label: Blue Note (BN-LA472-J2); Format: LP	This 2 record set contains unreleased tracks from the Night at Birdland session along with other, later, live Jazz Messengers live tracks.
Drum Suite	Released: 1957; Recorded: February 22, 1957; Label: Columbia (CL 1002); Format: LP	Side one is the Art Blakey Percussion Ensemble, side two is the Jazz Messengers.
Drums Around the Corner	Released: October 19, 1999; Recorded: November 2, 1958, and March 29, 1959; Label: Blue Note (21455); Format: CD	

== Albums recorded as a side musician ==
Year	Title	Leader	Label
1950	Dexter Gordon and His Boys	Dexter Gordon	Savoy (MG 9003)
1950	New Sound in Modern Music, Vol. 3	Dexter Gordon	Savoy (MG 9015)
1950	New Sound in Modern Music, Vol. 6	Fats Navarro	Savoy (MG 9019)
1950	Battle of the Saxes	Gene Ammons, Sonny Stitt	Prestige (PRLP 107)
1950	Tenor Sax, Vol. 1	Gene Ammons	Prestige (PRLP 112)
1951	Genius of Modern Music	Thelonious Monk	Blue Note (BLP 5002)
1951	Mr. Saxophone	Sonny Stitt	Prestige (PRLP 111)
1951	Sonny Stitt Favorites, Vol. 2	Sonny Stitt	Prestige (PRLP 126)
1951	Gene Ammons Favorites, Vol. 2	Gene Ammons	Prestige (PRLP 127)
1951	Dizzy Gillespie, Vol. 1	Dizzy Gillespie	Dee Gee (MG 1000)
1951	Collates	Illinois Jacquet	Clef (MGC 112)
1951	Collates #2	Illinois Jacquet	Clef (MGC 129)
1951	Wizard of the Vibes	Milt Jackson	Blue Note (BLP 5011)
1951	Swingin' with Zoot Sims	Zoot Sims	Prestige (PRLP 117)
1951	Tenor Sax Favorites	Zoot Sims	Prestige (PRLP 118)
1951	Modern Jazz Trombones, Vol. 2	Bennie Green, J. J. Johnson	Prestige (PRLP 123)
1951	The New Sounds	Miles Davis	Prestige (PRLP 124)
1951	Mambo Jazz	Sonny Rollins, Sonny Stitt, Joe Holiday, Kenny Graham	Prestige (PRLP 135)
1951	Sonny Rollins Quartet	Sonny Rollins	Prestige (PRLP 137)
1951	Blue Period	Miles Davis	Prestige (PRLP 140)
1952	James Moody and his Modernists with Chano Pozo	James Moody	Blue Note (BLP 5006)
1952	Genius of Modern Music: Volume 2	Thelonious Monk	Blue Note (BLP 5009)
1952	King of the Clarinet	Buddy DeFranco	MGM (E 177)
1952	Zoot Sims All Stars with Kai Winding and Al Cohn	Zoot Sims	Prestige (PRLP 138)
1952	King Pleasure Sings/Annie Ross Sings	Annie Ross	Prestige (PRLP 7128)
1952	Introducing the Horace Silver Trio	Horace Silver	Blue Note (BLP 5018)
1952	Thelonious Monk Trio	Thelonious Monk	Prestige (PRLP 142)
1952	New Faces-New Sounds	Lou Donaldson	Blue Note (BLP 5021)
1952	Disorder at the Border	Coleman Hawkins	Spotlite (SPJ 121) [1973]
1953	Buddy DeFranco with Strings	Buddy DeFranco	MGM (E 253)
1953	Introducing the Kenny Drew Trio	Kenny Drew	Blue Note (BLP 5023)
1953	Buddy DeFranco Quartet	Buddy DeFranco	Clef (MGC 149)
1953	Miles Davis Volume 2	Miles Davis	Blue Note (BLP 5022)
1953	Buddy DeFranco Takes You to the Stars	Buddy DeFranco	Gene Norman Presents (Vol. 2)
1953	New Star on the Horizon	Clifford Brown	Blue Note (BLP 5032)
1953	Introducing Paul Bley	Paul Bley	Debut (DLP 7)
1954	Miles Davis Volume 3	Miles Davis	Blue Note (BLP 5040)
1954	Miles Davis Quartet	Miles Davis	Prestige (PRLP 161)
1954	Elmo Hope Quintet	Elmo Hope	Blue Note (BLP 5044)
1954	Thelonious Monk Quintet	Thelonious Monk	Prestige (PRLP 180)
1954	Sonny Rollins Quintet	Sonny Rollins	Prestige (PRLP 186)
1954	Lou Donaldson Sextet, Vol. 2	Lou Donaldson	Blue Note (BLP 5055)
1954	Introducing Joe Gordon	Joe Gordon	EmArcy (MG 26046)
1954	Thelonious Monk Trio	Thelonious Monk	Prestige (PRLP 189)
1955	Clark Terry	Clark Terry	EmArcy (MG 36007)
1955	Jazz Original	Bud Powell	Norgran (MGN 1017)
1955	The Randy Weston Trio	Randy Weston	Riverside (RLP 2515)
1955	Afro-Cuban	Kenny Dorham	Blue Note (BLP5065, BLP 1535)
1955	Julius Watkins Sextet, Vol. 2	Julius Watkins	Blue Note (BLP 5064)
1955	Hank Mobley Quartet	Hank Mobley	Blue Note (BLP 5066)
1955	The Prophetic Herbie Nichols Vol. 2	Herbie Nichols	Blue Note (BLP 5069)
1955	Duke Jordan Trio and Quintet	Duke Jordan	Signal (S 1202)
1955	Gigi Gryce and Orchestra	Gigi Gryce	Signal (S 1201)
1955	Byrd's Eye View	Donald Byrd	Transition (TRLP J-4)
1956	The Unique Thelonious Monk	Thelonious Monk	Riverside (RLP 12-209)
1956	Metronome All-Stars 1956	Metronome All-Stars	Clef (MGC 743)
1957	Plenty, Plenty Soul	Milt Jackson	Atlantic (LP 1269)
1957	Hank Mobley and His All Stars	Hank Mobley	Blue Note (BLP 1544)
1957	A Date with Jimmy Smith Volume One	Jimmy Smith	Blue Note (BLP 1547)
1957	A Date with Jimmy Smith Volume Two	Jimmy Smith	Blue Note (BLP 1548)
1957	Blowing in from Chicago	Clifford Jordan, John Gilmore	Blue Note (BLP 1549)
1957	Hank Mobley Quintet	Hank Mobley	Blue Note (BLP 1550)
1957	Jimmy Smith at the Organ, Vol. 1	Jimmy Smith	Blue Note (BLP 1551)
1957	Jimmy Smith at the Organ, Vol. 2	Jimmy Smith	Blue Note (BLP 1552)
1957	The Sounds of Jimmy Smith	Jimmy Smith	Blue Note (BLP 1556)
1957	Sonny Rollins, Vol. 2	Sonny Rollins	Blue Note (BLP 1558)
1957	A Blowing Session	Johnny Griffin	Blue Note (BLP 1559)
1957	Monk's Music	Thelonious Monk	Riverside (RLP 12-242)
1958	House Party	Jimmy Smith	Blue Note (BLP 4002)
1958	Somethin' Else	Cannonball Adderley	Blue Note (BLP 1595)
1958	Minor Move	Tina Brooks	King (Japan) (GXF-3072)
1958	New Bottle Old Wine	Gil Evans	World Pacific (WP-1246)
1958	Blue Lights Volume 1	Kenny Burrell	Blue Note (BLP 1596)
1958	Blue Lights Volume 2	Kenny Burrell	Blue Note (BLP 1597)
1958	Things Are Getting Better	Cannonball Adderley, Milt Jackson	Riverside (RLP 12-286)
1959	Out of the Blue	Blue Mitchell	Riverside (RLP 12-293)
1959	My Conception	Sonny Clark	King (Japan) (GXF-3056)
1959	Swingin'	Kenny Burrell	King (Japan) (GXF-3070)
1959	On View at the Five Spot Cafe	Kenny Burrell	Blue Note (BLP 4021)
1959	Groovin' with Golson	Benny Golson	New Jazz (NJLP 8220)
1960	Here's Lee Morgan	Lee Morgan	Vee-Jay (NVJ2-910)
1960	Soul Station	Hank Mobley	Blue Note (BLP 4031)
1960	Comin' On!	Dizzy Reece	Blue Note (7243 5 22019 2)
1960	Lee-Way	Lee Morgan	Blue Note (BLP 4034)
1960	Soul Time	Bobby Timmons	Riverside (RLP 334)
1960	Second Genesis	Wayne Shorter	Vee-Jay (VJS 3057)
1960	Expoobident	Lee Morgan	Vee-Jay (VJLP 3015)
1960	Roll Call	Hank Mobley	Blue Note (BLP 4058)
1962	Nigeria	Grant Green	Blue Note (LT-1032)
1962	Congo Lament	Ike Quebec	Blue Note (LT-1089)
1964	Tom Cat	Lee Morgan	Blue Note (LT-1058)
1964	Blues Bag	Buddy DeFranco	Vee-Jay (VJLP 2506)
1964	I/We Had a Ball	Quincy Jones	Limelight (LM 82002)
1971	Giants of Jazz	Various Artists	Concord Jazz (GW 3004)
1971	The Giants of Jazz	Various Artists	Atlantic (SD 2–905)
1971	Something in Blue	Thelonious Monk	Black Lion (BL 152)
1971	The Man I Love	Thelonious Monk	Black Lion (BL 197)
1977	Illumination	Walter Davis, Jr.	Denon (DC-8553)
1980	Gotham City	Dexter Gordon	Columbia (JC 36853)
1987	Magical Trio 1	James Williams	EmArcy (832 859 2)

== Filmography ==
- 1965 Live in '65 (DVD)
- 1983 Jazz at the Smithsonian
- 1986 At Ronnie Scott's London (Video)
- 1995 The Jazz Messenger (Video/DVD)
- 1998 Art Blakey's Jazz Messengers
- 2001 Jazz Life, Vol. 2
- 2003 Modern Jazz at the Village Vanguard
- 2003 Live from Ronnie Scott's (DVD)
- 2003 Live at the Smithsonian
- 2004 Live at Village Vanguard
