= A Night in Tunisia (1958 album) =

1958 studio album by Art Blakey and the Jazz Messengers

Studio album by Art Blakey and the Jazz Messengers
- Released: Mid February 1958
- Recorded: April 2 & 8, 1957, NYC
- Genre: Hard bop
- Label: Vik
- Producer: Bob Rolontz

Art Blakey and the Jazz Messengers chronology
Hard Drive (1957)	A Night in Tunisia (1958)	Art Blakey's Jazz Messengers with Thelonious Monk (1958)

Professional ratings
Review scores
Source	Rating
AllMusic	4/5 stars

A Night in Tunisia is a 1958 jazz album by Art Blakey & the Jazz Messengers, released by the RCA Victor subsidiary label Vik. It features the only recorded instances of saxophonists Jackie McLean and Johnny Griffin playing together.

The album's original five tracks were augmented by up to three alternative takes on CD reissues. The album was also reissued under the title Theory of Art, with two nonet tracks – "A Night at Tony's" and "Social Call" – added.

== Track listing ==
=== A Night in Tunisia CD ===
1. "A Night in Tunisia" (Dizzy Gillespie, Frank Paparelli) – 12:55
2. "Off the Wall" (Johnny Griffin) – 7:16
3. "Theory of Art" (Bill Hardman) – 9:46
4. "Couldn't It Be You?" (Art Blakey, Jackie McLean) – 8:12
5. "Evans" (Sonny Rollins) – 6:30
6. "A Night in Tunisia" (Gillespie, Paparelli) – 12:30 Bonus track on CD re-issue.
7. "Off the Wall" (Griffin) – 7:21 Bonus track on CD re-issue.
8. "Theory of Art" (Hardman) – 10:14 Bonus track on CD re-issue.

=== Theory of Art CD ===
First five tracks as A Night in Tunisia, above.

6. "A Night at Tony's" (Gigi Gryce)
7. "Social Call" (Gryce, Jon Hendricks)

== Personnel ==
=== A Night in Tunisia ===
- Art Blakey – drums
- Bill Hardman – trumpet
- Johnny Griffin – tenor sax
- Jackie McLean (listed as Ferris Benda/Ferris Bender on the cover) – alto sax
- Sam Dockery – piano
- Spanky DeBrest – bass

=== Theory of Art ===
- Art Blakey – drums
- Bill Hardman – trumpet
- Lee Morgan – trumpet
- Melba Liston – trombone
- Cecil Payne – baritone sax
- Johnny Griffin – tenor sax
- Sahib Shihab – alto sax
- Wynton Kelly – piano
- Spanky DeBrest – bass
