= The Cool Voice of Rita Reys =

Studio album by Rita Reys
- Released: 1956
- Recorded: January 17 & August 16, 1955, and February 16, May 3 & June 25, 1956
- Studio: Phonogram Studios (Holland)
- Genre: Jazz
- Length: 35:46
- Label: Columbia CL 903; Philips B 08006 L
- Producer: George Avakian

Art Blakey chronology
Originally (1956)	The Cool Voice of Rita Reys (1956)	Hard Bop (1956)

Rita Reys chronology
The Cool Voice of Rita Reys (1955–1956)	The Cool Voice of Rita Reys No. 2 (1957)

Philips Records Release

The Cool Voice of Rita Reys is the debut album by Dutch jazz singer Rita Reys which features sessions recorded with bands led by drummers Art Blakey and her husband Wessel Ilcken. The sessions are divided over each side of the original LP which was released on the Dutch Philips and US Columbia labels.

== Reception ==
Professional ratings
Review scores
Source	Rating
Disc	3.5/5 stars

Allmusic stated "In 1956 Reys recorded probably her most famous album, The Cool Voice of Rita Reys. Her backup band was Art Blakey & the Jazz Messengers. Reys and Ilcken spent a few months in the United States during 1956–1957. She had opportunities to sing not only with Blakey but Jimmy Smith, Chico Hamilton, Clark Terry, and Mat Mathews".

== Track listing ==
1. "It's All Right with Me" (Cole Porter) – 2:37
2. "Gone with the Wind" (Allie Wrubel, Herb Magidson) – 2:35
3. "My Funny Valentine" (Lorenz Hart, Richard Rodgers) – 2:59
4. "But Not for Me" (George Gershwin, Ira Gershwin" – 2:09
5. "I Should Care" (Axel Stordahl, Paul Weston, Sammy Cahn) – 2:38
6. "There Will Never Be Another You" (Harry Warren, Mack Gordon) – 2:27
7. "I Cried for You" (Gus Arnheim, Arthur Freed, Abe Lyman) – 3:30
8. "You'd Be So Nice to Come Home To" (Porter) – 3:36
9. "My One and Only Love" (Guy Wood, Robert Mellin) – 4:14
10. "That Old Black Magic" (Harold Arlen, Johnny Mercer) – 2:56
11. "Spring Will Be a Little Late This Year" (Frank Loesser) – 3:41
12. "Taking a Chance on Love" (Vernon Duke, John La Touche, Ted Fetter) – 2:34
- Recorded at Phonogram Studios in Hilversum, Holland on January 17, 1955 (track 3), August 16, 1955 (tracks 5 & 6), and February 16, 1956 (tracks 1, 2 & 4), and in New York City on May 3, 1956 (tracks 7, 8, 10 & 12) and June 25, 1956 (tracks 9 & 11)

== Personnel ==
- Rita Reys – vocals
- Donald Byrd (tracks 7–12), Ack Van Rooyen (tracks 1, 2 & 4), Gerard Van Rooyen (tracks 5 & 6) – trumpet
- Dick Bezemer – trombone (track 3)
- Hank Mobley (tracks 7, 8, 10 & 12), Ira Sullivan (tracks 9 & 11), Toon Van Vliet (track 3, 5 & 6) – tenor saxophone
- Herman Schoonderwalt – baritone saxophone (tracks 1, 2 & 4)
- Kenny Drew (tracks 9 & 11), Rob Madna (tracks 1, 2 & 4–6), Horace Silver (tracks 7, 8, 10 & 12), Gerard Van Rooyen (track 3) – piano
- Chris Bender (track 3), Dick Bezemer (tracks 1, 2 & 4–6), Wilbur Ware (tracks 9 & 11), Doug Watkins (tracks 7, 8, 10 & 12) – bass
- Art Blakey (tracks 7–12), Wessel Ilcken (tracks 1–6) – drums
