= Saying Something =

Studio album by Bill Hardman Quintet
- Released: 1961
- Recorded: October 18, 1961
- Studio: Medallion Studio, Newark, NJ
- Genre: Jazz
- Length: 49:14 reissue with additional track
- Label: Savoy; MG 12170/SJL 1164
- Producer: Tom Wilson

Bill Hardman chronology
| Saying Something (1961) | Home (1978) |

1986 Reissue Cover

Saying Something is an album by American jazz trumpeter Bill Hardman which was recorded in 1961 and released on the Savoy label. The 1986 reissue added an additional track from the original sessions

== Reception ==
Professional ratings
Review scores
| Source | Rating |
|---|---|
| AllMusic | 3/5 stars |

The AllMusic review by Scott Yanow stated, "The music overall is solid hard bop, very much of the period but still fairly fresh".

== Track listing ==
All compositions by Bill Hardman, except where indicated.

1. "Capers" (Tom McIntosh) − 7:10
2. "Angel Eyes" (Matt Dennis, Earl Brent) − 5:56
3. "Jo B" − 9:52
4. "Buckeye Blues" − 10:46
5. "Assunta" (Cal Massey) − 6:11
6. "It Ain't Happened Yet" − 5:20
7. "With Malice Toward None" (McIntosh, Jon Hendricks) − 3:57 Additional track on reissue

== Personnel ==
- Bill Hardman − trumpet
- Sonny Red − alto saxophone (tracks 1–6)
- Ronnie Mathews − piano
- Bob Cunningham (tracks 1 & 6), Doug Watkins (tracks 2–5 & 7) − bass
- Jimmy Cobb − drums
