= Dylan Taylor (bassist) =

American jazz double bassist

- Born: March 29, 1960 (age 65); Norfolk, Virginia
- Genres: Jazz
- Occupation: Musician
- Instrument: Double bass
- Years active: 1980–present
- Website: dylantaylor.com

Dylan Taylor (born 1960) is a jazz double bassist.

== Early career ==
Dylan studied bass with Al Stauffer, Dennis Sandole, Buster Williams (under an NEA Jazz study Fellowship) and John Pattitucci at City College of New York, where he also studied composition with Mike Holober. In 2013 Taylor's musical score for the film Takao Dancer was premiered at the Tokyo International Film Festival.

== Debut album ==
Taylor produced his album Sweeter for the Struggle.

== Discography ==
=== As leader ===
- Sweeter for the Struggle (Miles, 2013)
- One in Mind (Blujazz, 2017),

‘’’With Kelly Meashey’’’

- ‘’Songs of Living’’ (CIMP, 2002)

=== As sideman ===
With Butch Ballard, Sam Dockery

- Mozaic

With Khan Jamal

- Percussion & Strings (CIMP, 1997)
- Balafon Dance (CIMP, 2002)
- Black Awareness (CIMP, 2005)
- Fire and Water (CIMP, 2007)
- ’’The Bells of Copenhagen’’ (CIMP, 2006)

‘’’With Bobby Zankel’’’

- ’’Many In Body, One In Mind’’ (CIMP 2007)
- ’’ Ceremonies of forgiveness’’(Dream box, 2006)
