= Spanky DeBrest =

American jazz musician

Jimmy "Spanky" DeBrest (April 24, 1937 in Philadelphia – March 2, 1973 in Philadelphia) was an American jazz bassist.

DeBrest played with Lee Morgan in his early years in Philadelphia. In 1957 he was a member of Ray Draper's Quintet, Jackie McLean, pianist Mal Waldron, and drummer Ben Dixon.

He played with Art Blakey's Jazz Messengers until 1958 which included Bill Hardman on trumpet and certain sessions with Thelonious Monk on piano. Other credits include work with John Coltrane, Clifford Jordan, Ray Draper, Lee Morgan, and J. J. Johnson. His last recordings were made in 1971.

== Discography ==
With Art Blakey

- Hard Bop (Columbia, 1956)
- Originally (Columbia, 1956 [1982])
- Ritual: The Modern Jazz Messengers (Pacific Jazz, 1957)
- Drum Suite (Columbia, 1956)
- Mirage (Savoy, 1957)
- Selections from Lerner and Loewe's... (Vik, 1957)
- Tough! (Cadet, 1957 [1966])
- A Night in Tunisia (Vik, 1957) - reissued as Theory of Art (Bluebird)
- Cu-Bop (Jubilee, 1957)
- Art Blakey's Jazz Messengers with Thelonious Monk (Atlantic, 1957) - with Thelonious Monk
- Hard Drive (Bethlehem, 1957)

With John Coltrane

- Like Sonny (Capitol, 1960)

With Ray Draper

- Tuba Sounds (Prestige, 1957)
- The Ray Draper Quintet featuring John Coltrane (New Jazz, 1957) - with John Coltrane
- A Tuba Jazz (Jubilee, 1958)

With J. J. Johnson

- Really Livin' (Columbia, 1959)

With Clifford Jordan

- Spellbound (Riverside, 1960)

With Harold Corbin

- Soul Brother (Roulette – Birdland Series, 1960)

With Lee Morgan

- We Remember You (Fresh Sound, 1991; recorded 1962)
