= Palo Congo =

Studio album by Sabu
- Released: October 1957
- Recorded: April 27, 1957
- Studio: Manhattan Towers, NYC
- Genre: Cuban rumba
- Length: 40:51
- Label: Blue Note; BLP 1561
- Producer: Alfred Lion

Sabú Martínez chronology
Palo Congo (1957)	Safari with Sabu (1958)

Palo Congo is the debut album by conguero Sabú Martínez, recorded on April 27, 1957 and released on Blue Note later that year. The octet features Arsenio Rodríguez, his brothers Raúl and "Quique"—alongside Ray "Mosquito" Romero—on congas, bassist Evaristo Baró, and vocalists Willie Capó and Sarah Baró.

== Reception ==
Professional ratings
Review scores
Source	Rating
AllMusic	4.5/5 stars

It was listed in the book 1001 Albums You Must Hear Before You Die.

== Track listing ==
Side 1
No.	Title	Length
1.	"El cumbanchero"	5:40
2.	"Billumba-Palo Congo"	6:09
3.	"Choferito-Plena"	4:05
4.	"Asabache"	4:25

Side 2
No.	Title	Length
1.	"Simba"	5:58
2.	"Rhapsodia del Maravilloso"	4:42
3.	"Aggo Elegua"	4:32
4.	"Tribilín cantore"	5:20

== Personnel ==
=== Musicians ===
- Louis "Sabú" Martínez – congas, bongos, vocals
- Arsenio Rodríguez – congas, tres, guitar, vocals
- Raúl "Caesar" Travieso – congas, vocals
- Israel Moisés "Quique" Travieso – congas
- Ray "Mosquito" Romero – congas
- Evaristo Baró – bass
- Willie Capó – vocals
- Sarah Baró – vocals

=== Technical personnel ===
- Alfred Lion – producer (uncredited)
- Rudy Van Gelder – recording engineer, mastering
- Reid Miles – design
- Francis Wolff – photography
- Hsio-yen Shih – liner notes
