= Moanin' (song) =

Song by Art Blakey and the Jazz Messengers

from the album Moanin'
- Language: English
- Written: 1950s
- Released: January 1959
- Recorded: October 30, 1958
- Studio: Van Gelder Studio, Hackensack
- Genre: Hard bop
- Length: 9:35
- Label: Blue Note
- Composer: Bobby Timmons
- Lyricist: Jon Hendricks
- Producer: Alfred Lion

Official audio
- "Moanin'" on YouTube

"Moanin'" is a composition by Bobby Timmons, first recorded by Art Blakey's band the Jazz Messengers for the album of the same title that was released by Blue Note Records. Both the single and album are in the Grammy Hall of Fame.

== Composition ==
"Moanin'" has a call and response melody. One account of its creation was given by Benny Golson, the tenor saxophonist in Blakey's band: Timmons had the opening eight bars, which he often played between tunes, but formed the complete song only after Golson encouraged him to add a bridge. It is played in F minor.

== Recordings and reception ==
"Moanin'" was first recorded, by Art Blakey's band the Jazz Messengers, on October 30, 1958, with Lee Morgan on trumpet, Benny Golson on tenor sax, Bobby Timmons on piano, and Jymie Merritt on bass. It has been recorded numerous times and has become a jazz standard. Gary Giddins stated that the song "set the music world on its ear" and that it was "part of the funky, back to roots movement that Horace Silver, Mingus, and Ray Charles helped, in different ways, to fan". Jon Hendricks later added lyrics, and the subsequent recording by Lambert, Hendricks & Ross made the song even more popular.

The original recording was inducted into the Grammy Hall of Fame in 1998; the album on which it appeared was added in 2001.

== Personnel ==
=== Art Blakey and the Jazz Messengers ===
- Lee Morgan – trumpet
- Benny Golson – tenor saxophone
- Bobby Timmons – piano
- Jymie Merritt – bass
- Art Blakey – drums

=== Technical personnel ===
- Alfred Lion – producer
- Rudy Van Gelder – recording engineer, mastering
