= Selections from Lerner and Loewe's... =

Studio album by Art Blakey and The Jazz Messengers
- Released: 1957
- Recorded: March 13, 1957; Webster Hall, New York City
- Genre: Jazz
- Label: Vik; LX 1103
- Producer: Bob Rolontz

Art Blakey and The Jazz Messengers chronology
A Midnight Session with the Jazz Messengers (1957)	Selections from Lerner and Loewe's... (1957)	Cu-Bop (1957)

Selections from Lerner and Loewe's... is an album by drummer Art Blakey and the Jazz Messengers recorded in 1957 and released on the RCA Victor subsidiary label Vik. The album features the band's jazz interpretations of show tunes from Lerner and Loewe's musicals My Fair Lady, Brigadoon, and Paint Your Wagon.

== Reception ==
Professional ratings
Review scores
Source	Rating
AllMusic	4/5 stars

AllMusic awarded the album 4 stars, the review by Scott Yanow stating: "One of the rarest of all Art Blakey records... Despite some of the musicians' unfamiliarity with the songs, this date is quite successful".

== Track listing ==
All compositions by Alan Jay Lerner and Frederick Loewe

1. "I Could Have Danced All Night" - 4:16
2. "On the Street Where You Live" - 9:02
3. "There But for You Go I" - 4:34
4. "They Call the Wind Maria" - 4:56
5. "I Talk to the Trees" - 8:58
6. "Almost Like Being in Love" - 4:50

== Personnel ==
- Art Blakey - drums
- Bill Hardman - trumpet
- Johnny Griffin - tenor saxophone
- Sam Dockery - piano
- Spanky DeBrest - bass
