= Rita Reys =

Dutch jazz singer (1924–2013)

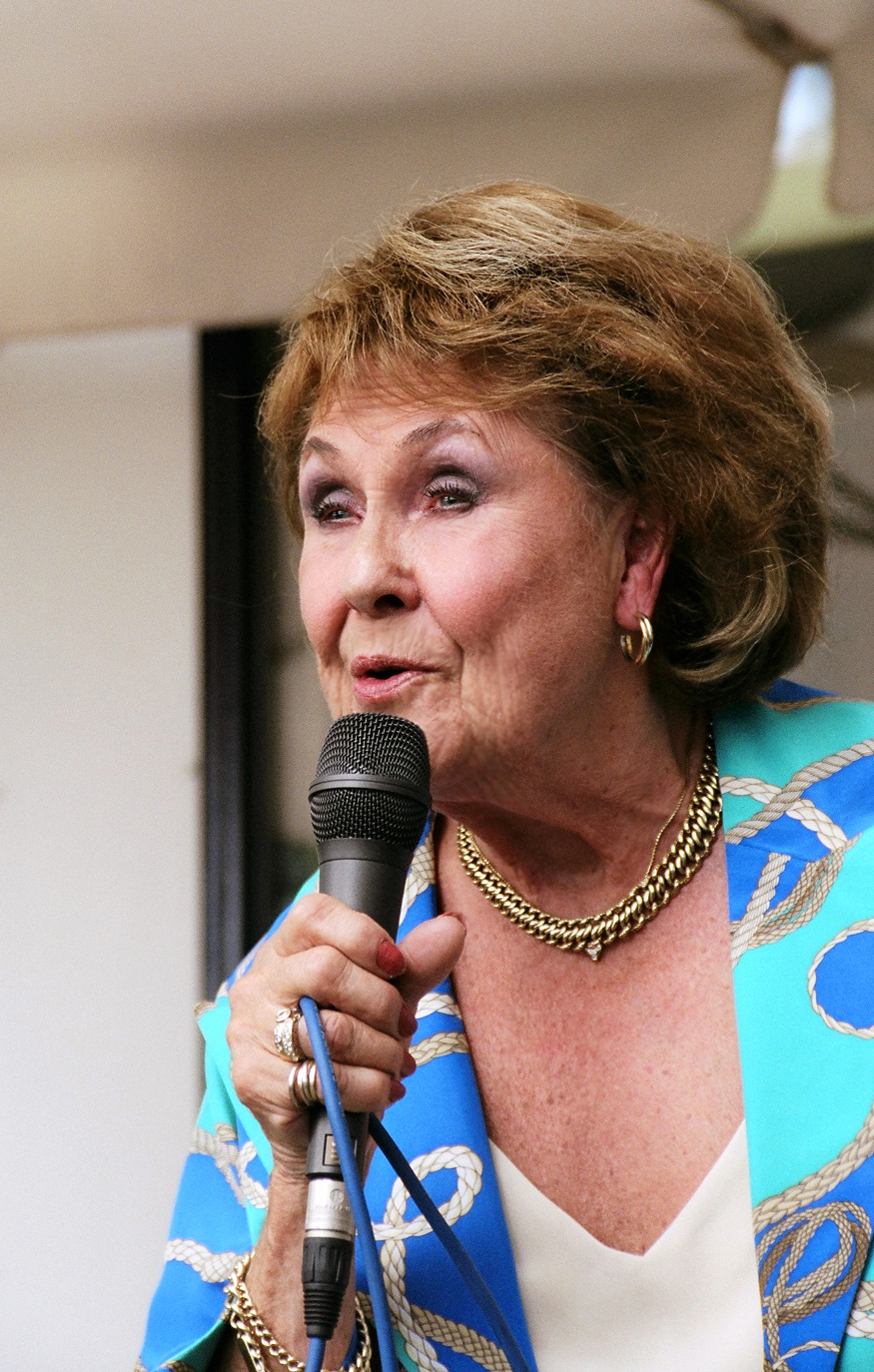
- Reys performing in Hotel De Watergeus, Noorden, Netherlands, in 2004

Background information
- Born: Maria Everdina Reijs; 21 December 1924; Rotterdam, Netherlands
- Died: 28 July 2013 (aged 88) Breukelen
- Genres: Jazz, bossa nova
- Occupation: Singer
- Label: Universal
- Website: ritareys.eu

Rita Reys (born Maria Everdina Reijs; 21 December 1924 – 28 July 2013) was a jazz singer from the Netherlands. She was promoted as "Europe's First Lady of Jazz".

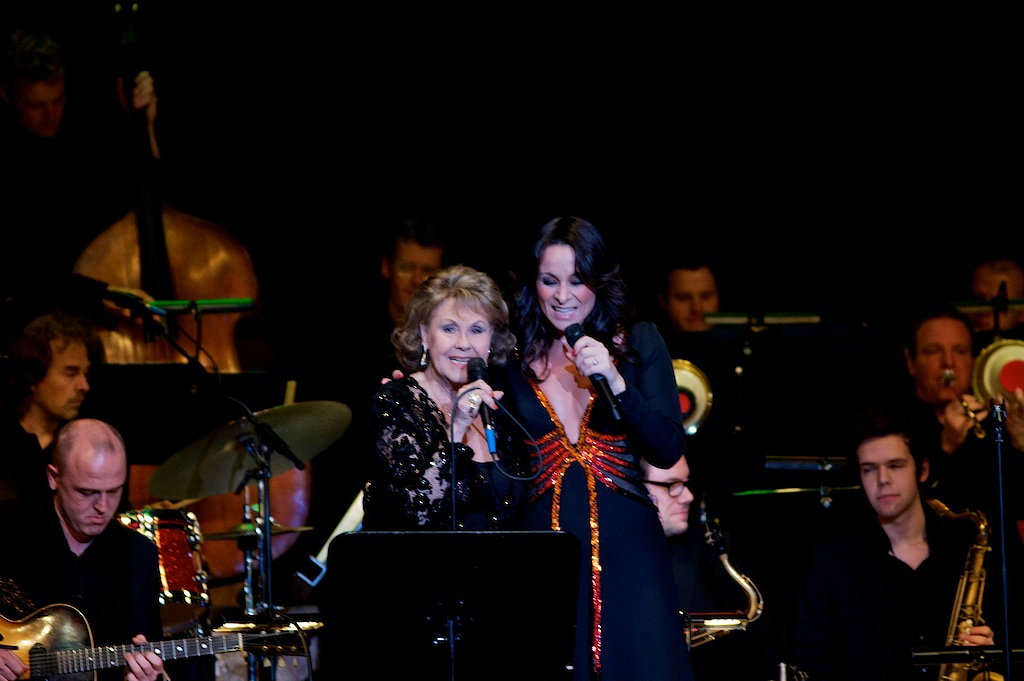
Rita Reys & Trijntje Oosterhuis at the Amsterdam Concertgebouw, singing White Christmas, Thursday 17 December 2009.

In the 1980s, Rita returned to the American Songbook, recording albums such as Memories of You with the Lex Jasper orchestra. She died in Breukelen, the Netherlands, on 28 July 2013.

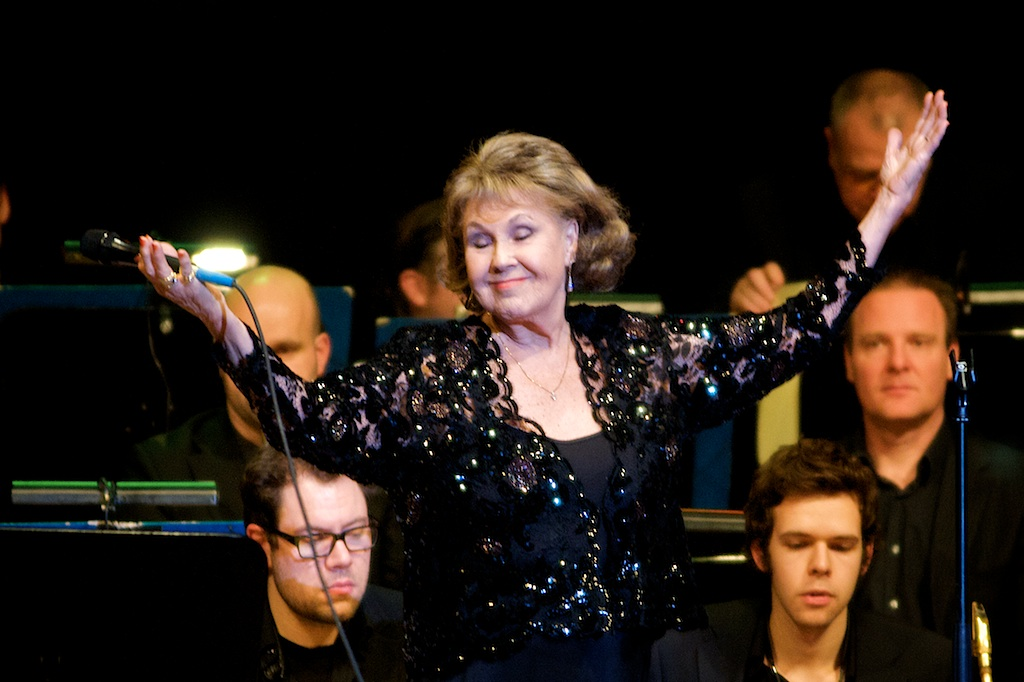
Rita Reys gets a standing ovation at the Amsterdam Concertgebouw, Thursday 17 December 2009.

== Discography ==
- The Cool Voice of Rita Reys (Columbia, 1956)
- The Cool Voice of Rita Reys No. 2 (Philips, 1957)
- New Voices (Dawn, 1957)
- Two Jazzy People with Bengt Hallberg (Philips, 1959)
- Marriage in Modern Jazz with Pim Jacobs (Philips, 1960)
- Jazz Pictures at an Exhibition with Pim Jacobs (Philips, 1961)
- Jazz Sir, That's Our Baby (Philips, 1963)
- Rita Reys at the Golden Circle Club Stockholm with Pim Jacobs (Philips, 1963)
- Rita Reys Meets Oliver Nelson (Philips, 1965)
- Congratulations in Jazz (Philips, 1965)
- Rita a Go-Go with Pim Jacobs (Philips, 1967)
- Today: Recorded in London (Philips, 1969)
- Sings Burt Bacharach (CBS, 1971)
- Rita Reys Sings Michel Legrand (CBS, 1972)
- Our Favorite Songs with Pim Jacobs (CBS, 1973)
- Rita Reys Sings the George Gershwin Songbook (CBS, 1975)
- That Old Feeling with Pim Jacobs (CBS, 1979)
- Collage (CBS, 1980)
- Sings Antonio Carlos Jobim (Philips, 1981)
- Collage with Pim Jacobs (CBS, 1981)
- Rita Reys (Philips, 1982)
- Memories of You with Pim Jacobs (Utopia Music, 1983)
- Have Yourself a Merry Little Christmas with Pim Jacobs (Polydor, 1986)
- Live at the Concertgebouw with Pim Jacobs (RCA, 1986)
- Two for Tea with Louis Van Dijk (Polydor, 1987)
- Relax with Rita & Pim (Philips, 1989)
- Swing & Sweet (Blue Note, 1990)
- The American Songbook Volume 1 (Music-All-In, 1992)
- The American Songbook Volume 2 (Music-All-In, 1992)
- Loss of Love: Rita Reys Sings Henry Mancini (Quintessence, 1998)
- The Lady Strikes Again (Quintessence, 1999)
- Once Upon a Summertime (Koch, 1999)
- Young at Heart (Wedgeview Music, 2010)
