= The Jazz Messengers (album) =

Studio album by The Jazz Messengers
- Released: November 1956
- Recorded: April 6 & May 4, 1956; Columbia 30th Street Studio, New York City
- Genre: Jazz, hard bop
- Length: 77:14
- Label: Columbia CL 897; CK 65265 (1997)
- Producer: George Avakian; Michael Cuscuna (1997)

The Jazz Messengers chronology
At the Cafe Bohemia, Vol. 2 (1956)	The Jazz Messengers (1956)	Originally (1956)

Professional ratings
Review scores
Source	Rating
AllMusic	4/5 stars
The Penguin Guide to Jazz Recordings	3.5/4 stars

The Jazz Messengers is the first studio album by the Jazz Messengers, released in 1956 by Columbia Records. It was their fourth overall album (after the two At the Cafe Bohemia live albums and the 1956 compilation), and also their last recording to feature the group's co-founder, Horace Silver, on piano.

In 1968, Columbia reissued the LP in their Jazz Odyssey Series with a new cover under the title Art Blakey with the Original Jazz Messengers. In 1997 the album was digitally remastered and released on CD, again with its original title and cover, featuring all the tracks from the original LP along with five additional tracks from the same recording sessions that were previously released only on foreign imports.

== Track listing ==
This is the track listing for the current Columbia CD release. Tracks 1−7 are from the original LP and in the same order (Columbia CL 897, 1956). The adjacent tracks 8−10 and 12 were first released on Originally (Columbia FC 38036, 1982). Track 11 was previously unreleased.

1. "Infra-Rae" (Hank Mobley) - 6:57
2. "Nica's Dream" (Horace Silver) - 11:51
3. "It's You or No One" (Sammy Cahn, Jule Styne) - 5:36
4. "Ecaroh" (Silver) - 6:02
5. "Carol's Interlude" (Mobley) - 5:36
6. "The End of a Love Affair" (E.C. Redding) - 6:43
7. "Hank's Symphony" (Mobley) - 4:37
8. "Weird-O" (Mobley) - 7:06
9. "Ill Wind" (Harold Arlen, Ted Koehler) - 2:52
10. "Late Show" (Mobley) - 7:09
11. "Deciphering the Message" (Mobley) - 6:29
12. "Carol's Interlude (alternate take)" (Mobley) - 6:13

== Personnel ==
- Art Blakey, drums
- Donald Byrd, trumpet
- Hank Mobley, tenor saxophone
- Horace Silver, piano
- Doug Watkins, bass

== Versions ==
- The Jazz Messengers (LP), Columbia, US, 1956
- The Jazz Messengers (LP), Philips, Europe, 1956
- Art Blakey with the Original Jazz Messengers (LP reissue) Columbia Jazz Odyssey Series, US, 1968
- The Jazz Messengers (LP reissue), Columbia, US, 1981
- The Jazz Messengers (CD, remastered), Columbia / Legacy, US and Europe, 1997
- The Jazz Messengers (2x 180 g LP reissue) Columbia / Pure Pleasure, US, 2011
- The Jazz Messengers (MC reissue) PolyGram Spain
