= Cu-Bop =

Studio album by Art Blakey and His Jazz Messengers with Sabu
- Released: 1957
- Recorded: May 13, 1957; New York City
- Genre: Jazz
- Length: 35:22
- Label: Jubilee; JG 1049
- Producer: Lee Kraft

Art Blakey and the Jazz Messengers chronology
| Tough! (1957) | Cu-Bop (1957) | Art Blakey's Jazz Messengers with Thelonious Monk (1957) |

Cu-Bop is an album by drummer Art Blakey and The Jazz Messengers with conguero Sabu recorded in 1957 and originally released on the Jubilee label.

== Reception ==
Professional ratings
Review scores
| Source | Rating |
|---|---|
| Allmusic | 3/5 stars |
| Disc | 3/5 stars |

Allmusic awarded the album 3 stars.

== Track listing ==
1. "Woody 'n' You" (Dizzy Gillespie) - 6:10
2. "Sakeena" (Art Blakey) - 11:55
3. "Shorty" (Johnny Griffin) - 4:32
4. "Dawn on the Desert" (Charlie Shavers) - 12:45

== Personnel ==
- Art Blakey - drums
- Bill Hardman - trumpet
- Johnny Griffin - tenor saxophone
- Sam Dockery - piano
- Spanky DeBrest - bass
- Sabu Martinez - congas, bongos
