= Art Blakey Big Band =

Studio album by Art Blakey
- Released: Last week of January 1959
- Recorded: December 1957; New York City
- Genre: Jazz, hard bop
- Label: Bethlehem; BCP 6023
- Producer: Lee Kraft

Art Blakey chronology
Hard Drive (1957)	Art Blakey Big Band (1959)	Moanin' (1958)

Art Blakey Big Band (also called Art Blakey's Big Band and Art Blakey and his Drivin' Big Band) is an album by drummer Art Blakey recorded in late 1957 and originally released on the Bethlehem label. It differs from typical Art Blakey releases as his regular quintet was expanded to form a big band for these arrangements.

In the mid-1990s, and again in the 2000s, the album was repackaged and released under John Coltrane's name, combining it with several songs from Winner's Circle, another album featuring Coltrane and recorded for the Bethlehem label in 1957. This edition features several alternate takes which were released here for the first time.

== Reception ==
Professional ratings
Review scores
Source	Rating
Allmusic	2.5/5 stars
The Rolling Stone Jazz Record Guide	3/5 stars

Allmusic awarded the album 2½ stars stating "Throughout his long career as a bandleader, drummer Art Blakey very rarely played with big bands. This Bethlehem date was a one-shot affair, an opportunity for his powerful drumming to be heard propelling a 15-piece orchestra through a set of mostly new material".

== Track listing ==
1. "Midriff" (Gerald Valentine) – 3:17
2. "Ain't Life Grand" (Al Cohn) – 3:21
3. "Tippin'" (Donald Byrd) – 6:23
4. "Pristine" (John Coltrane) – 5:35
5. "El Toro Valiente" (Charles Gambel, Chiefy Salaam) – 2:43
6. "The Kiss of No Return" (Gambel, Salaam) – 5:37
7. "Late Date" (Melba Liston) – 3:33
8. "The Outer World" (Cohn) – 4:06

== Personnel ==
- Art Blakey – drums
- Ray Copeland (tracks 1, 2 & 5–8), Bill Hardman (tracks 1, 2 & 5–8), Idrees Sulieman (tracks 1, 2 & 5–8), Donald Byrd – trumpet
- Frank Rehak, Jimmy Cleveland, Melba Liston – trombone (tracks 1, 2 & 5–8)
- Bill Graham, Sahib Shihab – alto saxophone (tracks 1, 2 & 5–8) (feature: track 6)
- Al Cohn (tracks 1, 2 & 5–8), John Coltrane – tenor saxophone
- Bill Slapin – baritone saxophone (tracks 1, 2 & 5–8)
- Walter Bishop, Jr. – piano
- Wendell Marshall – bass
- “Tippin” & “Pristine” feature a quintet of Donald Byrd, John Coltrane, Walter Bishop Jr., Wendell Marshall, and Blakey.
