= Sabu Martinez =

American musician (1930–1979)

- Born: Louis Martinez; July 14, 1930; New York City, US
- Died: January 13, 1979 (aged 48); Sweden
- Occupation(s): Conguero, Percussionist
- Years active: 1941–1979

Louis "Sabu" Martinez (July 14, 1930 – January 13, 1979) was an American conguero of Puerto Rican descent. A prominent player in the Cubop movement, Martinez appeared on many important recordings and live performances during that period. Martinez also recorded several Latin jazz albums, now recognized as classics of the genre.

Born in New York City, Martinez made his professional debut in 1941 aged 11. He replaced Chano Pozo in Dizzy Gillespie's orchestra in 1948, and began performing with Benny Goodman's Bebop Orchestra in 1949. Over the next 15 years, Martinez worked with Charlie Parker, Duke Ellington, Count Basie, J. J. Johnson, Horace Silver, Thelonious Monk, Charles Mingus, Mary Lou Williams, Lionel Hampton, Noro Morales, Marcelino Guerra, Esy Morales, the Lecuona Cuban Boys, Miguelito Valdés, Tito Rodríguez, and the Joe Loco Trio, José Curbelo. He also worked with vocalists Tony Bennett, Sammy Davis Jr., and Harry Belafonte.

Martinez first recorded with Art Blakey in 1953, and contributed to his Orgy in Rhythm and Holiday for Skins projects from 1957 to 1958. Martinez became a bandleader in 1957, recording his debut album, Palo Congo, for the Blue Note label. He followed it up with releases on Vik and Alegre Records. Martinez moved to Sweden in 1967 and recorded with the Francy Boland-Kenny Clarke big band, releasing two albums. Subsequently, he led the group Burnt Sugar, which was active into the mid 1970s. On January 13, 1979, he died in Sweden at the age of 48 from a gastric ulcer.

== Discography ==
=== As leader/Co-leader ===
- Palo Congo (Blue Note, 1957)
- Safari With Sabu (Vik, 1958)
- Sabu And His Percussion Ensemble, Sorcery! (Columbia, 1958)
- Sabu's Jazz Espagnole (Alegre, 1961)
- Sabu Martinez Och Björbobandet, Aurora Borealis (Coop, 1971)
- Afro Temple (Grammofonverket, 1973)
- Burned Sugar (Mellotronen, 2008) - recorded in 1973 and 1974
- Sabu Martinez and Sahib Shihab, Winds & Skins (Mellotronen, 2008) - recorded in 1967 and 1978

=== As contributor ===
- Dizzy Gillespie - The Complete RCA Victor Recordings (Bluebird, 1937-1949, [1995])
- J. J. Johnson (1953). The Eminent Jay Jay Johnson. Blue Note Records.
- Horace Silver, Art Blakey - Horace Silver Trio and Art Blakey-Sabu (Blue Note Records, 1953)
- J. J. Johnson; Clifford Brown (1953). Jay Jay Johnson All Stars. Blue Note Records.
- Louis Bellson - The Driving Louis Bellson (Norgran, 1955)
- Art Blakey - Drum Suite (Columbia, 1957)
- Art Blakey - Orgy in Rhythm (Blue Note, 1957)
- Art Blakey - Cu-Bop (Jubilee, 1957)
- Art Blakey - Holiday for Skins (Blue Note, 1959)
- Johnny Richards (1958). Rites of Diablo. Roulette Records.
- George Russell (1966). The Essence of... Soul Note.
- Kenny Clarke/Francy Boland Big Band: Latin Kaleidoscope (MPS, 1969)
- Peter Herbolzheimer Rhythm Combination & Brass (1973). Wide Open. Polydor.
- Ed Thigpen (1974). Action-Re-Action. GNP.
- Charlie Mariano (1974). Reflections. Catalyst Records.
- Art Farmer (1976). A Sleeping Bee. Sonet.
- Mads Vinding Group (1977). Mads Vinding Group. Cosmos Collector.
- George Russell (1978). New York Big Band. Soul Note.
- Terry Allen (1979). Lubbock. Fate.
- Patato (1984). Masterpiece. Messidor.
- Tony Bennett (1987). Jazz. Columbia Records.
- Peruchin; Charlie Palmieri (1995). Cuban Rhythms. Caney.
