= Moanin' =

1958 studio album by Art Blakey and the Jazz Messengers

Art Blakey and the Jazz Messengers
- Moanin'

Studio album by Art Blakey and the Jazz Messengers
- Released: late 1958
- Recorded: October 30, 1958
- Studios: Van Gelder Studio; Hackensack, New Jersey
- Genre: Hard bop
- Length: 40:16
- Labels: Blue Note; BLP 4003
- Producer: Alfred Lion

Art Blakey chronology
Art Blakey Big Band (1957)	Art Blakey and the Jazz Messengers (1958)	Drums Around the Corner (1959)

The Jazz Messengers chronology
Art Blakey's Jazz Messengers with Thelonious Monk (1958)	Moanin' (1959)	The Big Beat (1960)

Art Blakey and the Jazz Messengers, also called Moanin', is a studio album by Art Blakey and the Jazz Messengers recorded on October 30, 1958, and released on Blue Note later that year. (Note: Some sources place the release date in January 1959.)

== Background ==
This was Blakey's first album for Blue Note in several years, after a period of recording for a number of different labels, and marked both a homecoming and a fresh start. Originally the LP was self-titled, but the instant popularity of the bluesy opening track, "Moanin'," composed by pianist Bobby Timmons, led to its becoming known by that title.

=== Composition ===
The rest of the originals are by saxophonist Benny Golson (who was not with the Jazz Messengers for long, this being the only U.S. album on which he is featured). "Are You Real?" is a propulsive 32-bar piece with a four-bar tag, featuring two-part writing for Golson and trumpeter Lee Morgan. "Along Came Betty" is a more lyrical, long-lined piece, almost serving as the album's ballad. "The Drum Thunder Suite" is a feature for Blakey, in three movements: "Drum Thunder"; "Cry a Blue Tear"; and "Harlem's Disciples". "Blues March" calls on the feeling of the New Orleans marching bands, and the album finishes on its only standard, an unusually brisk reading of "Come Rain or Come Shine". Of the originals on the album, all but the "Drum Thunder Suite" became staples of the Messengers book, even after Timmons and Golson were gone. Recorded by Rudy Van Gelder in his meticulous Hackensack studios, this recording reflects the hallmark precision associated with that engineer – on the 1999 CD reissue there is a brief conversation between Lee Morgan and Rudy Van Gelder going over Morgan's solo.

=== Influence ===
A vocalese version of "Moanin'" was later written by Jon Hendricks and recorded by his group Lambert, Hendricks & Ross Hendricks sang the song on the 1973 Prestige Records album "Buhaina" (Art Blakey and the Jazz Messengers). Other versions include jazz vocalists Mel Tormé, Bill Henderson and Karrin Allyson.

== Reception ==
Professional ratings
Review scores
Source	Rating
AllMusic	5/5 stars
The Rolling Stone Jazz Record Guide	4/5 stars
Encyclopedia of Popular Music	5/5 stars
The Penguin Guide to Jazz Recordings	3.5/4 stars

The album stands as one of the archetypal hard bop albums of the era, for the intensity of Blakey's drumming and the work of Morgan, Golson, and Timmons, and for its combination of old-fashioned gospel and blues influences with a sophisticated modern jazz sensibility. The album was identified by jazz critic Scott Yanow as one of "17 Essential Hard Bop Recordings". AllMusic gives it a five-star review, stating: "Moanin' includes some of the greatest music Blakey produced in the studio with arguably his very best band. ... ranks with the very best of Blakey and what modern jazz offered in the late '50s and beyond."

== Track listing ==
=== Original release ===
All tracks are written by Benny Golson, except as noted.

Side 1
No.	Title	Writer(s)	Length
1.	"Moanin'"	Bobby Timmons	9:35
2.	"Are You Real"	Benny Golson; Lee Morgan	4:50
3.	"Along Came Betty"		6:12

Side 2
No.	Title	Writer(s)	Length
1.	"The Drum Thunder (Miniature) Suite" "First Theme: Drum Thunder" "Second Theme: Cry a Blue Tear" "Third Theme: Harlem's Disciples"		7:33
2.	"Blues March"		6:17
3.	"Come Rain or Come Shine"	Harold Arlen; Johnny Mercer	5:49
Total length:			40:16

=== CD reissue ===
No.	Title	Writer(s)	Length
1.	"Warm-up and dialogue between Lee Morgan and Rudy Van Gelder"		0:35
2.	"Moanin'"	Bobby Timmons	9:35
3.	"Are You Real"		4:50
4.	"Along Came Betty"	Golson; Morgan	6:12
5.	"The Drum Thunder Suite"		7:33
6.	"Blues March"		6:17
7.	"Come Rain or Come Shine"	Arlen; Mercer	5:49
8.	"Moanin'" (alternate take)	Timmons	9:19

== Personnel ==
=== Art Blakey and the Jazz Messengers ===
- Lee Morgan – trumpet
- Benny Golson – tenor saxophone
- Bobby Timmons – piano
- Jymie Merritt – bass
- Art Blakey – drums

=== Technical personnel ===
- Alfred Lion – producer
- Rudy Van Gelder – recording engineer, mastering
- Buck Hoeffler – photography
- Leonard Feather – liner notes

== Charts ==
Chart performance for Moanin'
Chart (2021)	Peak position
Swedish Jazz Albums (Sverigetopplistan)	3
Swedish Vinyl Albums (Sverigetopplistan)	2

Chart (2026)	Peak position
Australian Jazz & Blues Albums (ARIA)	13
