= Ritual: The Modern Jazz Messengers =

Ritual

Studio album by Art Blakey and The Jazz Messengers
- Released: 1960
- Recorded: January 14 and February 11, 1957
- Genre: Jazz
- Length: 61:30
- Label: Pacific Jazz (1960, 1962, see text); Blue Note (1988)
- Producer: George Avakian; Michael Cuscuna

Art Blakey chronology
A Night at Birdland, Vol. 2 (1956)	Ritual (1960)	Drum Suite (1956-57)

The Jazz Messengers chronology
Drum Suite (1956-57)	Ritual (1957)	A Midnight Session with the Jazz Messengers (1957)

Professional ratings
Review scores
Source	Rating
Allmusic	3/5 stars
Disc	3.5/5 stars

Ritual is a studio album by the Jazz Messengers featuring Art Blakey. Three years after being recorded, it was first released on the Pacific Jazz Records label as PJM-402, and reissued by them in 1962, with an Elmo Hope session, as Art Blakey & The Jazz Messengers/The Elmo Hope Quintet* Featuring Harold Land as PJ-33. It has been reissued on CD.

This later CD, however, features all the recordings from the original Ritual release, plus the Blakey album Once Upon a Groove, which featured two additional songs recorded in the same 1957 sessions, but not released for several decades (as Blue Note LT-1065). This album is highlighted by hard-swinging sounds from saxophonist Jackie McLean, who previously made his debut with Miles Davis in 1951, and trumpeter Bill Hardman, who played with Charles Mingus during the previous year earlier in 1956.

== Track listing ==
1. "Sam's Tune" (Sam Dockery) – 5:52
2. "Scotch Blues" (Duke Jordan) – 8:31
3. "Once Upon a Groove" (Owen Eugene Marshall) – 8:36
4. "Art Blakey's Comments on Ritual" (Art Blakey) – 1:55
5. "Ritual" (Art Blakey) – 9:59
6. "Touche" (Mal Waldron) – 6:16
7. "Wake Up!" (Lee Sears) – 5:04
8. "Little T." (Donald Byrd)- 8:46 _{from Once Upon a Groove}
9. "Exhibit A" (Art Blakey, Lee Sears) – 6:44 _{from Once Upon a Groove}

Note: Among many re-issues and compilations, tracks 3, 4, 5, and 6 were re-issued in 1957 on Jazztone's Jazz Messages

== Personnel ==
=== The Jazz Mesengers ===
- Art Blakey – drums
- Bill Hardman – trumpet
- Jackie McLean – alto sax
- Sam Dockery – piano
- Spanky DeBrest – bass

=== Production ===
- George Avakian – original producer
- Richard Bock – engineer
- Michael Cuscuna – liner notes
- Ron McMaster – digital transfers
- John Altoon – cover art
