= Tough! =

Studio album by Art Blakey and The Jazz Messengers
- Released: January 1966
- Recorded: Spring, 1957
- Studio: Swedien Recording Studio, Minneapolis, Minnesota
- Genre: Jazz
- Label: Cadet; LP 4049

Art Blakey and The Jazz Messengers chronology
Soul Finger (1965)	Tough! (1966)	Like Someone in Love (1967)

Tough! is an album by drummer Art Blakey and The Jazz Messengers recorded in 1957 but not released on the Cadet label until 1966.

== Reception ==
Professional ratings
Review scores
Source	Rating
Allmusic	3/5 stars

Allmusic awarded the album 3 stars.

== Track listing ==
1. "Scotch Blues" (Duke Jordan) - 7:55
2. "Flight to Jordu" (Jordan) - 7:20
3. "Transfiguration" (Gigi Gryce) - 5:08
4. "Exhibit A" (Gryce) - 6:37
5. "Gershwin Medley: Rhapsody in Blue/Summertime/Someone to Watch Over Me/The Man I Love" (George Gershwin, Ira Gershwin) - 5:57

== Personnel ==
- Art Blakey - drums
- Bill Hardman - trumpet
- Jackie McLean - alto saxophone
- Sam Dockery - piano
- Spanky DeBrest - bass
