= A Midnight Session with the Jazz Messengers =

Live album by Art Blakey and the Jazz Messengers
- Released: 1957
- Recorded: March 8–9, 1957
- Venue: Carl Fischer Concert Hall, New York City
- Genre: Hard bop
- Length: 36:46
- Label: Elektra; EKL 120 (Mono) EKS 7120 (Stereo)
- Producer: Jac Holzman

Art Blakey chronology
Orgy in Rhythm (1957)	A Midnight Session with the Jazz Messengers (1957)	Selections from Lerner and Loewe's... (1957)

The Jazz Messengers chronology
Ritual (1957)	A Midnight Session with the Jazz Messengers (1957)	Selections from Lerner and Loewe's... (1957)

Savoy Cover

Mirage Cover

A Midnight Session with the Jazz Messengers is a live album by Art Blakey & the Jazz Messengers originally released on the Elektra label in 1957. The album masters were sold to Savoy and re-released as Art Blakey and the Jazz Messengers in 1960 and Mirage in 1977.

== Reception ==
Professional ratings
Review scores
Source	Rating
AllMusic	3/5 stars
The Rolling Stone Jazz Record Guide	3/5 stars

The AllMusic review by Scott Yanow stated, "Already at this early stage, the band was the epitome of hard bop and just beginning to become an influential force. ... the music is consistently excellent and typically hard swinging".

== Track listing ==
1. "Casino" (Gigi Gryce) – 5:00
2. "The Biddie Griddies" (Ray Draper) – 5:56
3. "Potpourri" (Mal Waldron) – 4:21
4. "Ugh!" (Draper) – 5:33
5. "Mirage" (Waldron) – 4:39
6. "Reflections of Buhaina" (Draper) – 6:47 Originally issued on Mono LP
7. "Study in Rhythm" (Art Blakey) – 4:12 Originally issued on Stereo LP
8. "Reflections on Buhaina (alternate take)" (Draper) – 4:42 Bonus track on CD re-issue

== Personnel ==
- Art Blakey – drums
- Bill Hardman – trumpet
- Jackie McLean – alto saxophone
- Sam Dockery – piano
- Spanky DeBrest – bass
