= Orgy in Rhythm =

Studio album by Art Blakey
- Released: End of May 1957 (Vol. One); Early October 1957 (Vol. Two)
- Recorded: March 7, 1957
- Studio: Manhattan Towers; New York City
- Genre: Jazz
- Length: 38:54 (Vol. One); 29:14 (Vol. Two); 68:08 (CD reissue)
- Label: Blue Note; BLP 1554 (Vol. One); BLP 1555 (Vol. Two)

Art Blakey chronology
Drum Suite (1957)	Orgy in Rhythm (1957)	A Midnight Session with the Jazz Messengers (1957)

Professional ratings
Review scores
Source	Rating
AllMusic	4/5 stars
The Encyclopedia of Popular Music	3/5 stars
The Penguin Guide to Jazz Recordings	4/4 stars

Orgy in Rhythm, Volumes One & Two are a pair of separate but related albums by American jazz drummer Art Blakey, recorded on March 7, 1957 and released on Blue Note later that same year in May and October respectively.

== Background ==
=== Style ===
It is an early example of a percussion-oriented jazz record, a format Blakey had first explored on the A-side to Drum Suite released on Columbia the month before Orgy in Rhythm, Volume One.

=== Release history ===
In the 1997 limited-edition CD reissue by Blue Note, it was consolidated into a single volume.

== Track listing ==
=== Orgy in Rhythm, Volume One ===
All tracks are written by Art Blakey.

Side 1
No.	Title	Length
1.	"Buhaina Chant"	10:30
2.	"Ya Ya"	7:06
Total length:		17:36

Side 2
No.	Title	Length
1.	"Toffi"	12:20
2.	"Split Skins"	8:58
Total length:		21:18 38:54

=== Orgy in Rhythm, Volume Two ===
All tracks are written by Art Blakey.

Side 1
No.	Title	Length
1.	"Amuck"	6:49
2.	"Elephant Walk"	6:56
Total length:		13:45

Side 2
No.	Title	Length
1.	"Come Out and Meet Me Tonight"	5:43
2.	"Abdallah's Delight"	9:46
Total length:		15:29 29:14

=== 1997 CD reissue ===
All tracks are written by Art Blakey.

No.	Title	Length
1.	"Buhaina Chant"	10:30
2.	"Ya Ya"	7:06
3.	"Toffi"	12:20
4.	"Split Skins"	8:58
5.	"Amuck"	6:49
6.	"Elephant Walk"	6:56
7.	"Come Out and Meet Me Tonight"	5:43
8.	"Abdallah's Delight"	9:46
Total length:		1:08:08

== Personnel ==
- Art Blakey – drums, vocals ("Toffi")
- Herbie Mann – flute
- Ray Bryant – piano
- Wendell Marshall – bass
- Sabu Martinez – percussion, vocals ("Buhaina Chant," "Elephant Walk" & "Come Out and Meet Me Tonight")
- Ubaldo Nieto – percussion, timbales
- Evilio Quintero – percussion, maracas, cencerro
- Carlos "Patato" Valdes – percussion
- Jo Jones – drums, tympani
- Arthur Taylor – drums
- Specs Wright – drums, tympani
