= Sam Dockery =

North American musician

Samuel Dockery (1929 – December 21, 2015), nicknamed Sure-Footed Sam, was a hard bop pianist and well-respected musician on the Philadelphia jazz scene since the early 1950s. Dockery was born in Camden, New Jersey. He appears on 11 recordings as the pianist for Art Blakey & the Jazz Messengers and composed "Sam's Tune" which appears on their 1957 Blue Note recording Ritual. In 1963 he was the pianist for Betty Carter's extended engagement at Birdland, and headed The Sam Dockery Trio in Philadelphia during the 1990s. He also taught at Philadelphia's University of the Arts. He died in a nursing home in 2015, aged 86. His brother was bassist Wayne Dockery.

== Discography ==
With Art Blakey

- Hard Bop (Columbia, 1956)
- Originally (Columbia, 1956) - unreleased until 1982
- Drum Suite (Columbia, 1956)
- Mirage (Savoy, 1957)
- Ritual: The Modern Jazz Messengers (Pacific Jazz, 1957)
- Selections from Lerner and Loewe's... (Vik, 1957)
- A Night in Tunisia (Vik, 1957)
- Cu-Bop (Jubilee, 1957)
- Tough! (Cadet, 1957 [1966])
- Hard Drive (Bethlehem, 1957)

With Clifford Brown

- The Beginning and the End (Columbia, 1973) - 1956 performance recorded in Philadelphia

With Butch Ballard and Dylan Taylor

- Mozaic
