= Hard Drive (Art Blakey album) =

Studio album by Art Blakey's Jazz Messengers
- Released: Early December 1957
- Recorded: October 9 & 11, 1957
- Studio: New York City
- Genre: Jazz
- Length: 38:51
- Label: Bethlehem; BCP 6023
- Producer: Lee Kraft

Art Blakey chronology
Art Blakey's Jazz Messengers with Thelonious Monk (1957)	Hard Drive (1957)	Art Blakey Big Band (1957)

The Jazz Messengers chronology
Art Blakey's Jazz Messengers with Thelonious Monk (1957)	Hard Drive (1957)	Art Blakey and the Jazz Messengers (1958)

Hard Drive is an album by drummer Art Blakey with The Jazz Messengers recorded in late 1957 and originally released on the Bethlehem label. The album has frequently been credited to "Art Blakey's Jazz Messengers," and has also been released under the titles Le Messager Du Jazz (France) and For Minors Only (UK & France).

== Reception ==
Professional ratings
Review scores
Source	Rating
Allmusic	3/5 stars
DownBeat	4/5 stars

Allmusic awarded the album 3 stars stating "The music on this album is typical hard bop of the period, well played and full of enthusiasm and fire".

DownBeat gave the album 4 stars. Reviewer John Litweiler wrote, "In 1957, this band was in the pure creative center of the hard bop movement; the high standards of swing and imagination serve as fine examples of the mainstream of jazz".

== Track listing ==
1. "For Minors Only" (Jimmy Heath) - 5:49
2. "Right Down Front" (Johnny Griffin) - 4:31
3. "Deo-X" (Bill Hardman) - 5:50
4. "Sweet Sakeena" (Hardman) - 5:06
5. "For Miles and Miles" (Heath) - 5:24
6. "Krafty" (Griffin) - 6:35
7. "Late Spring" (Leon Mitchell) - 5:36

Bonus tracks on CD reissue:

8. "Tippin'" (Donald Byrd) - 7:03
9. "Pristine" (John Coltrane) - 5:37
- Recorded in New York City on October 9 (track 3), October 11 (tracks 1, 2 & 4–7), and December (tracks 8, 9), 1957.

== Personnel ==
- Art Blakey - drums
- Bill Hardman (tracks 1–7), Donald Byrd (tracks 8, 9) - trumpet
- Johnny Griffin (tracks 1–7), John Coltrane (tracks 8, 9) - tenor saxophone
- Junior Mance (tracks 1, 2 & 4–7), Sam Dockery (track 3), Walter Bishop (tracks 8, 9) - piano
- Spanky DeBrest - bass
