= Hard Bop (album) =

Studio album by The Jazz Messengers
- Released: October 1957
- Recorded: December 12–13, 1956
- Studio: Columbia 30th Street Studio, New York City
- Genre: Jazz
- Label: Columbia; CL 1040
- Producer: Alan Douglas

The Jazz Messengers chronology
Originally (1956)	Hard Bop (1957)	Drum Suite (1956-57)

Hard Bop is an album by drummer Art Blakey and The Jazz Messengers recorded in 1956 and originally released on the Columbia label. It was performed by the Jazz Messengers and recorded in CBS Street Studio.

== Reception ==
Professional ratings
Review scores
Source	Rating
Allmusic	4/5 stars
Disc	4.5/5 stars
The Rolling Stone Jazz Record Guide	5/5 stars

Allmusic awarded the album 4 stars calling it "an excellent hard bop set".

== Track listing ==
1. "Cranky Spanky" (Bill Hardman) – 4:45
2. "Stella by Starlight" (Ned Washington, Victor Young) – 8:50
3. "My Heart Stood Still" (Lorenz Hart, Richard Rodgers) – 5:33
4. "Little Melonae" (Jackie McLean) – 8:20
5. "Stanley's Stiff Chicken" (Hardman, McLean) – 9:25

== Personnel ==
- Art Blakey – drums
- Bill Hardman – trumpet
- Jackie McLean – alto saxophone
- Sam Dockery – piano
- Spanky DeBrest – bass
