= Bill Hardman =

American jazz musician (1933–1990)

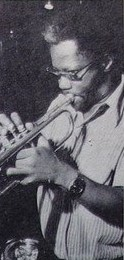

William Franklin Hardman Jr. (April 6, 1933 – December 6, 1990) was an American jazz trumpeter and flugelhornist who chiefly played hard bop. He was married to Roseline, and together they had a daughter named Nadege.

== Career ==
Hardman was born and grew up in Cleveland, Ohio, and worked with local players including Bobby Few and Bob Cunningham; while in high school he appeared with Tadd Dameron, and after graduation he joined Tiny Bradshaw's band. Hardman's first recording was with Jackie McLean in 1956; he later played with Charles Mingus, Art Blakey and the Jazz Messengers, Horace Silver, and Lou Donaldson, and led a group with Junior Cook. Hardman also recorded as a leader: Saying Something on the Savoy label received critical acclaim in jazz circles, but was little known to the general public. He had three periods in as many decades with Art Blakey's Jazz Messengers; Hardman's misfortune was not to be with the Messengers at the time of their popular Blue Note recordings. Blakey occasionally featured him playing several extended choruses unaccompanied.

He died in Paris, France, of a brain hemorrhage, aged 57.

== Playing style and legacy ==
A hard bop player noted for technical proficiency, precise articulation, and a direct tone, Hardman later incorporated elements of a fuller, more extroverted romantic style into his playing compared to Clifford Brown – a direction he would take increasingly throughout the late-1960s and 1970s. He figures by and large among the top ranks of hardbop titans of the time, although he never managed a commercial breakthrough like many of his colleagues such as Donald Byrd, Freddie Hubbard and Lee Morgan.

== Discography ==
=== As leader ===
- 1961 – Saying Something (Savoy)
- 1978 – Home (Muse)
- 1980 – Focus (Muse)
- 1981 – Politely (Muse)
- 1989 – What's Up (SteepleChase)

With Brass Company

- 1975 – Colors (Strata-East)

=== As sideman ===
With Art Blakey

- Hard Bop (Columbia, 1956)
- Drum Suite (Columbia, 1957)
- Selections from Lerner and Loewe's... (Vik, 1957)
- A Night in Tunisia (Vik, 1957)
- Cu-Bop (Jubilee, 1957)
- Ritual: The Modern Jazz Messengers (Pacific Jazz 1957)
- A Midnight Session with the Jazz Messengers (Elektra, 1957)
- Art Blakey's Jazz Messengers With Thelonious Monk (Atlantic, 1957)
- Hard Drive (Bethlehem, 1957)
- Art Blakey Big Band (Bethlehem, 1957)
- Jazz Messengers '70 (Catalyst, 1970)
- Tough! (Cadet, 1966) – rec. 1957
- Live! Vol. 1 (TRIP, 1974) – live rec. 1968
- Backgammon (Roulette, 1976)
- Originally (Columbia, 1982) – rec. 1956

With Lou Donaldson

- Sunny Side Up (Blue Note, 1961) – rec. 1960
- Possum Head (Argo, 1964)
- Musty Rusty (Cadet, 1965)
- Fried Buzzard (Cadet, 1970) – live rec. 1965

With Charles Earland

- Infant Eyes (Muse, 1979)
- Pleasant Afternoon (Muse, 1981)

With Curtis Fuller

- Crankin' (Mainstream, 1971)
- Smokin' (Mainstream, 1972)

With Jackie McLean

- Jackie's Pal (Prestige, 1956)
- McLean's Scene (New Jazz, 1956)
- Jackie McLean & Co. (Prestige, 1957)

With others

- Dave Bailey, 2 Feet in the Gutter (Epic, 1961)
- Walter Bishop Jr, Hot House (Muse, 1979)
- Junior Cook, Good Cookin' (Muse, 1979)
- Benny Golson, Pop + Jazz = Swing (Audio Fidelity, 1961) – also released as Just Jazz!
- Eddie Jefferson, Come Along with Me (Prestige, 1969)
- Ronnie Mathews, Legacy (Bee Hive, 1979)
- Jimmy McGriff, Movin' Upside the Blues (JAM, 1982)
- Charles Mingus, A Modern Jazz Symposium of Music and Poetry (Bethlehem, 1957)
- Hank Mobley, Hank Mobley (album) (Blue Note, 1957)
- Houston Person, Wild Flower (Muse, 1977)
- Sonny Stitt, In Walked Sonny (Sonnet, 1975)
- Mickey Tucker, Sojourn (Xanadu, 1977)
- Steve Turre, Viewpoints and Vibrations (Stash, 1987)
- Mal Waldron, Mal/2 (Prestige, 1957)
- Reuben Wilson, The Sweet Life (Groove Merchant, 1973)
- Dodo Marmarosa, Dodo Marmarosa - The Chicago Sessions (1961-1962)[2 LP] (Argo Jazz, LP2, 1962-11-02)
