= Originally =

Studio album by Art Blakey and The Jazz Messengers
- Released: 1982
- Recorded: April 5, May 4, June 25 and December 12, 1956; New York City
- Genre: Jazz
- Label: Columbia; FC 38036
- Producer: Alan Douglas

The Jazz Messengers chronology
The Jazz Messengers (1956)	Originally (1982)	Hard Bop (1956)

Originally is an album by drummer Art Blakey and The Jazz Messengers recorded in 1956, but not released on the Columbia label until 1982. The album features unreleased tracks from the sessions that produced The Jazz Messengers and Hard Bop which have since been released as bonus tracks on those albums and Drum Suite.

== Reception ==
Professional ratings
Review scores
Source	Rating
AllMusic	2/5 stars
The Rolling Stone Jazz Record Guide	4/5 stars

AllMusic awarded the album 2 stars stating "This LP contains valuable performances by the early Jazz Messengers that sat unissued until decades later.... Although not an essential set, Art Blakey fans will find this album to be a valuable gapfiller in the history of The Jazz Messengers".

== Track listing ==
1. "Late Show" (Hank Mobley) - 7:08
2. "Ill Wind" (Harold Arlen, Ted Koehler) - 2:52
3. "Weird-O" (Mobley) - 7:05
4. "Carol's Interlude" [Alternative Take] (Mobley) - 6:14
5. "Lil' T" (Donald Byrd) - 8:08
6. "The New Message" (Byrd) - 8:38
7. "Gershwin Medley: Rhapsody in Blue/Summertime/Someone to Watch Over Me/The Man I Love" (George Gershwin) - 4:51
- Recorded in New York City on April 5 (tracks 1 & 2), May 4 (tracks 3 & 4), June 25 (tracks 5 & 6), and December 12 (track 7), 1956

== Personnel ==
- Art Blakey - drums
- Donald Byrd (tracks 1–6), Bill Hardman (track 7) - trumpet
- Hank Mobley (tracks 1–4), Ira Sullivan (tracks 5 & 6) - tenor saxophone
- Jackie McLean - alto saxophone (track 7)
- Horace Silver (tracks 1–4), Kenny Drew (tracks 5 & 6), Sam Dockery (track 7) - piano
- Doug Watkins (tracks 1–4), Wilbur Ware (tracks 5 & 6), Spanky DeBrest (track 7) - bass
