= Drum Suite =

Album by Art Blakey

Studio album by Art Blakey and the Jazz Messengers
- Released: April 1957
- Recorded: June 25, 1956; December 13, 1956; February 22, 1957
- Studio: Columbia 30th Street Studio; New York City
- Genre: Jazz
- Length: 40:57
- Label: Columbia; CL 1002
- Producer: George Avakian

Art Blakey chronology
| Ritual (1957) | Drum Suite (1957) | Orgy in Rhythm (1957) |

The Jazz Messengers chronology
| Hard Bop (1956) | Drum Suite (1956–57) | Ritual (1957) |

Drum Suite is an album by drummer Art Blakey and the Jazz Messengers and the Art Blakey Percussion Ensemble, recorded in late 1956 and early 1957 and originally released on Columbia in April 1957. It was the first of several albums recorded by Blakey in the 1950s and 1960s that explored percussion-oriented jazz. It was followed by Orgy in Rhythm, Holiday for Skins, and The African Beat.

The 2005 CD reissue added three tracks from a June 1956 session, two of them previously released on Originally in 1982.

== Reception ==
Professional ratings
Review scores
| Source | Rating |
|---|---|
| Allmusic | 4/5 stars |
| Disc | 4/5 stars |

Allmusic awarded the album 4 stars, calling it "Groundbreaking for its time, and still sounding vital, powerful, and visionary, the Drum Suite album is somewhat of a lost masterpiece that deserves a fresh audience".

== Track listing ==
=== Original release ===
Side one: Drum Suite
| No. | Title | Writer(s) | Length |
|---|---|---|---|
| 1. | "The Sacrifice" | Art Blakey | 5:16 |
| 2. | "Cubano Chant" | Ray Bryant | 4:01 |
| 3. | "Oscalypso" | Oscar Pettiford | 8:48 |

Side two: The Jazz Messengers
| No. | Title | Writer(s) | Length |
|---|---|---|---|
| 1. | "Nica's Tempo" | Gigi Gryce | 8:24 |
| 2. | "D's Dilemma" | Mal Waldron | 8:32 |
| 3. | "Just for Marty" | Bill Hardman | 5:56 |

=== 2005 Columbia/Legacy CD reissue ===
| No. | Title | Writer(s) | Length |
|---|---|---|---|
| 1. | "The Sacrifice" | Art Blakey | 5:16 |
| 2. | "Cubano Chant" | Ray Bryant | 4:01 |
| 3. | "Oscalypso" | Oscar Pettiford | 8:48 |
| 4. | "Nica's Tempo" | Gigi Gryce | 8:24 |
| 5. | "D's Dilemma" | Mal Waldron | 8:32 |
| 6. | "Just for Marty" | Bill Hardman | 5:56 |
| 7. | "Lil' T (a.k.a. The Third)" | | 8:12 |
| 8. | "The New Message (a.k.a. Little T)" (Take 1) | | 8:39 |
| 9. | "The New Message (a.k.a. Little T)" (Take 3) | | 5:32 |

== Personnel ==
=== June 25, 1956 (Tracks 7–9) ===
- Art Blakey – drums
- Donald Byrd – trumpet
- Ira Sullivan – tenor saxophone
- Kenny Drew – piano
- Wilbur Ware – bass

=== The Jazz Messengers—December 13, 1956 (Side two) ===
- Art Blakey – drums
- Bill Hardman – trumpet
- Jackie McLean – alto saxophone
- Sam Dockery – piano
- Spanky DeBrest – bass

=== The Art Blakey Percussion Ensemble—February 22, 1957 (Side one) ===
- Art Blakey – drums
- Ray Bryant – piano
- Oscar Pettiford – bass, cello
- Jo Jones – drums
- Charles "Specs" Wright – drums, timpani, gong
- Candido Camero, Sabu Martinez – bongos
