= Art Blakey's Jazz Messengers with Thelonious Monk =

Studio album by Art Blakey and The Jazz Messengers with Thelonious Monk
- Released: May 1958
- Recorded: May 14–15, 1957
- Genre: Jazz
- Length: 44:35
- Label: Atlantic
- Producer: Nesuhi Ertegün

Art Blakey and the Jazz Messengers chronology
Cu-Bop (1957)	Art Blakey's Jazz Messengers with Thelonious Monk (1958)	Hard Drive (1957)

Thelonious Monk chronology
Mulligan Meets Monk (1957)	Art Blakey's Jazz Messengers with Thelonious Monk (1958)	Thelonious in Action (1958)

Professional ratings
Review scores
Source	Rating
AllMusic	4/5 stars
Billboard	3/4 stars
DownBeat	4/5 stars
Penguin Guide to Jazz	👑
The Rolling Stone Jazz Record Guide	5/5 stars
Encyclopedia of Popular Music	4/5 stars

Art Blakey's Jazz Messengers with Thelonious Monk is a studio album released in 1958 by Atlantic Records. It is a collaboration between the Jazz Messengers, the group led by drummer Art Blakey, and Thelonious Monk on piano.

== Background ==
Throughout the preceding decade, on sessions for both Blue Note and Riverside, Blakey had supported Monk on various occasions. Monk returned the favor on this one-off session for Atlantic. Blakey was on the verge of beginning a long-term contract with Blue Note, while Monk was in the middle of his stay on Riverside.

One month after these recordings, Monk would begin his summer and autumn residency at the Five Spot on Cooper Square after regaining his cabaret card, without which he had been barred from playing in most of New York City's clubs. Monk's quartet featuring John Coltrane at that residency would bring Monk fame beyond the inner circle of jazz aficionados. Atlantic released this album over a year after it was recorded, thereby capitalizing on Monk's increased visibility.

This was the first album featuring Monk to be recorded in stereo; its sessions preceded the Riverside album Monk's Music by roughly 5 weeks.

== Reception ==
Billboard in 1958 gave the album three stars out of four, stating that it has some "mighty good jazz". AllMusic gave the album a four-star rating out of a possible five stars, with writer Lindsay Planer noting that "both co-leaders are at the peak of their respective prowess with insightful interpretations of nearly half a dozen inspired performances from this incarnation of the Blakey-led Jazz Messengers." The Penguin Guide to Jazz assigned its "crown" accolade to the album. Dom Cerulli of DownBeat commented, "The L.P. is angular, often quite brittle, but also quite representative of Monk and where he stands today."

On February 16, 1999, Rhino Records reissued the album remastered in its original mono mix for compact disc. (The previous CD release on Atlantic Records had featured the original stereo mix.) Three bonus tracks were included, all outtakes from the May 1957 sessions. In 2022, a two CD reissue on Atlantic added three more alternate takes.

== Track listing ==
=== Side one ===
No.	Title	Writer(s)	Length
1.	"Evidence"	Thelonious Monk	6:46
2.	"In Walked Bud"	Thelonious Monk	6:39
3.	"Blue Monk"	Thelonious Monk	7:54

=== Side two ===
No.	Title	Writer(s)	Length
1.	"I Mean You"	Thelonious Monk, Coleman Hawkins	8:02
2.	"Rhythm-a-ning"	Thelonious Monk	7:20
3.	"Purple Shades"	Johnny Griffin	7:48

=== 1999 bonus tracks ===
No.	Title	Writer(s)	Length
7.	"Evidence (alternate take)"	Thelonious Monk	5:30
8.	"Blue Monk (alternate take)"	Thelonious Monk	6:59
9.	"I Mean You (alternate take)"	Thelonious Monk	7:34

=== 2022 bonus disc ===
No.	Title	Writer(s)	Length
1.	"Evidence (take 2)"	Thelonious Monk	6:21
2.	"In Walked Bud (take 2)"	Thelonious Monk	6:21
3.	"Blue Monk (take 9)"	Thelonious Monk	7:03
4.	"I Mean You (take 3)"	Thelonious Monk, Coleman Hawkins	7:35
5.	"Rhythm-a-ning (take 2)"	Thelonious Monk	7:13
6.	"Purple Shades"	Johnny Griffin	7:13

== Personnel ==
- Art Blakey – drums
- Bill Hardman – trumpet
- Johnny Griffin – tenor saxophone
- Thelonious Monk – piano
- Spanky DeBrest – bass

=== Additional personnel ===
- Nesuhi Ertegün – production
- Earl Brown – recording engineering
- Bob Carlton, Patrick Milligan – 1999 Rhino reissue supervision
- Dan Hersch – digital remastering for 1999 Rhino reissue
