= Wayne Shorter discography =

This is a comprehensive list of the discography of the jazz saxophonist and composer Wayne Shorter as a leader and sideman.

== As leader/co-leader ==
Recording date	Title / Co-leader	Label	Year released	Notes
1959-11-09, -10	Introducing Wayne Shorter (also released as Blues a la Carte)	Vee-Jay	1959	
1960-10-11	Second Genesis	Vee-Jay	1974	
1961-11-02, -06	Wayning Moments	Vee-Jay	1962	
1964-04-29	Night Dreamer	Blue Note	1964	Reissued CD (1987) includes an alternate take
1964-08-03	JuJu	Blue Note	1965	Reissued CD (1996) includes alternate takes
1964-12-24	Speak No Evil	Blue Note	1966	Reissued CDs (1999, 2013) include alternate takes
1965-03-04	The Soothsayer	Blue Note	1979	LT series. Reissued CD (1990) includes an alternate take.
1965-06-14	Et Cetera	Blue Note	1980	LT series
1965-10-15	The All Seeing Eye	Blue Note	1966	
1966-02-03, -24	Adam's Apple	Blue Note	1967	Reissued CD (1987) includes an unreleased material
1967-03-10	Schizophrenia	Blue Note	1969	
1969-08-29, 1969-09-02	Super Nova	Blue Note	1969	
1970-04-03	Moto Grosso Feio	Blue Note	1974	LA series
1970-08-26	Odyssey of Iska	Blue Note	1971	
1974-09-12	Native Dancer (featuring Milton Nascimento)	Columbia	1975	
1985	Atlantis	Columbia	1985	
1986	Phantom Navigator	Columbia	1987	
1988	Joy Ryder	Columbia	1988	
1988-07-14	Live at the Montreux Jazz Festival 1988 (with Carlos Santana)	Vap (Japan)	2005	[2CD, DVD-Video] Live at the Montreux Jazz Festival
1992-09-19, 1994	A Tribute to Miles (with Herbie Hancock, Tony Williams, Ron Carter, Wallace Roney)	Qwest/Reprise/Warner Bros.	1994	Partially live
1994 - 1995	High Life	Verve	1995	
1997	1+1 (with Herbie Hancock)	Verve	1997	
2001-07-14, -20, -24	Footprints Live!	Verve	2002	Live at Vitoria-Gasteiz jazz festival and Jardins Palais Longchamps
2003?	Alegría	Verve	2003	
2002 – 2004	Beyond the Sound Barrier (as Wayne Shorter Quartet)	Verve	2005	Live recordings selected from the tour in North America, Europe and Asia
2010-12-08, 2011	Without a Net (as Wayne Shorter Quartet)	Blue Note	2013	Live recordings selected from Europe tour, except for 1 studio recording track
2016	Emanon	Blue Note	2018	[3CD] Partially live at The Barbican, London (disk 2 & 3)
2017-09-03	Live at the Detroit Jazz Festival (with Terri Lyne Carrington, Esperanza Spalding, Leo Genovese)	Candid	2022	Live at Detroit International Jazz Festival
2014-10-18	Celebration Volume 1	Blue Note	2024	Live recordings from the Stockholm Jazz Festival

== As a member ==
The Young Lions
with Frank Strozier, Lee Morgan, Bobby Timmons, Bob Cranshaw, Albert Heath and Louis Hayes

- The Young Lions (Vee-Jay, 1961) – rec. 1960

The Jazz Messengers

- 1959: Africaine (Blue Note, 1981)
- 1959: Paris Jam Session (Fontana, 1961)
- 1960: A Night in Tunisia (Blue Note, 1961)
- 1960: Like Someone in Love (Blue Note)
- 1960: Meet You at the Jazz Corner of the World (Blue Note, 1967)
- 1960: The Big Beat (Blue Note, 1960)
- 1961: Roots & Herbs (Blue Note, 1970)
- 1961: A Day with Art Blakey (Baybridge (Japan), 1981)
- 1961: Art Blakey!!!!! Jazz Messengers!!!!! (Impulse!, 1961)
- 1961: Buhaina's Delight (Blue Note, 1963)
- 1961: Mosaic (Blue Note, 1962)
- 1961: The Freedom Rider (Blue Note, 1964)
- 1961: The Witch Doctor (Blue Note, 1969)
- 1961: Tokyo 1961 (Solar, 2014)
- 1961: Paris Jazz Concert: Olympia May 13th 1961 (Trema (F), 1992)
- 1962: Caravan (Riverside, 1963)
- 1961-62: Three Blind Mice (Blue Note, 1962)
- 1963: Ugetsu (Riverside, 1963)
- 1963: Golden Boy (Colpix, 1963)
- 1964: Free for All (Blue Note, 1965)
- 1964: Kyoto (Riverside, 1966)
- 1964: Indestructible (Blue Note, 1966)

Weather Report

- 1971: Weather Report (Columbia, 1971)
- 1972: I Sing the Body Electric (Columbia, 1972)
- 1972: Live in Tokyo (CBS/Sony, 1972)
- 1973: Sweetnighter (Columbia, 1973)
- 1973-74: Mysterious Traveller (Columbia, 1974)
- 1975: Tale Spinnin' (Columbia, 1975)
- 1975-76: Black Market (Columbia, 1976)
- 1976-77: Heavy Weather (Columbia, 1977)
- 1978: Mr. Gone (Columbia, 1978)
- 1979: 8:30 (Columbia, 1979)
- 1980: Night Passage (Columbia, 1980)
- 1981: Weather Report (Columbia, 1982)
- 1983?: Procession (Columbia, 1983)
- 1983: Domino Theory (Columbia, 1984)
- 1984: Sportin' Life (Columbia, 1985)
- 1985: This Is This! (Columbia, 1986)

The V.S.O.P. Quintet

- 1977: The Quintet (Columbia, 1977)
- 1977: Tempest in the Colosseum (CBS/Sony, 1977)
- 1979: Live Under the Sky (CBS/Sony, 1979)[2CD]
- 1979: Five Stars (CBS/Sony, 1979)

The Manhattan Project
with Gil Goldstein, Lenny White, Michel Petrucciani, Pete Levin and Stanley Clarke

- The Manhattan Project (Blue Note, 1990) – rec. 1989

== As sideman ==
With Miles Davis

- 1959-62 Jingle Bell Jazz (Columbia, 1962) – on "Blue Xmas (To Whom It May Concern)"
- 1963 The Giants of Jazz (Columbia, 1963) – on "Devil May Care," the one Davis track on this Columbia anthology; also released as single B-side of "Seven Steps to Heaven"
- 1964: Miles in Berlin (Columbia, 1965)
- 1965: E.S.P. (Columbia, 1965)
- 1965: The Complete Live at the Plugged Nickel 1965 (Legacy, 1995)
- 1966: Miles Smiles (Columbia, 1967)
- 1967: Sorcerer (Columbia, 1967)
- 1967: Nefertiti (Columbia, 1968)
- 1966-67: Miles Davis at Newport 1955-1975: The Bootleg Series Vol. 4 (Legacy, 2015)
- 1967: Live in Europe 1967: The Bootleg Series Vol. 1 (Legacy, 2011)
- 1967-68: Water Babies (Columbia, 1976)
- 1968: Miles in the Sky (Columbia, 1968)
- 1968: Filles de Kilimanjaro (Columbia, 1969)
- 1969: In a Silent Way (Columbia, 1969)
- 1969: 1969 Miles Festiva De Juan Pins (CBS/Sony, 1993)
- 1969: Live in Europe 1969: The Bootleg Series Vol. 2 (Legacy, 2013)
- 1969: Bitches Brew (Columbia, 1970)
- 1970 Live at the Fillmore East (Columbia, 2001)
- compilation: Big Fun (Columbia, 1974)
- compilation: Circle in the Round (Columbia, 1979)
- compilation: Directions (Columbia, 1980)

With Herbie Hancock

- 1975: Man-Child (Columbia, 1975)
- 1976: VSOP (Columbia, 1977)
- 1977: VSOP: The Quintet (Columbia, 1975)
- 1977: VSOP: Tempest in the Colosseum (CBS/Sony, 1977)
- 1979: VSOP: Live Under the Sky (CBS/Sony, 1979)
- 1983: Sound-System (Columbia, 1984)
- 1985: Round Midnight – Original Motion Picture Soundtrack (Columbia, 1986)
- 1998: Gershwin's World (Verve, 1998)
- 2001: Future2Future (Transparent, 2001)
- 2006-07: River: The Joni Letters (Verve, 2007)
- 2010: The Imagine Project (Hancock, 2010)

With Freddie Hubbard

- 1961: Ready for Freddie (Blue Note, 1962)
- 1962: Here to Stay (Blue Note, 1976)
- 1963: The Body & the Soul (Impulse!, 1964)

With Joni Mitchell

- 1977: Don Juan's Reckless Daughter (Asylum, 1977)
- 1978-79: Mingus (Asylum, 1979)
- 1982?: Wild Things Run Fast (Geffen, 1982)
- 1984-85: Dog Eat Dog (Geffen, 1985)
- 1986-87: Chalk Mark in a Rain Storm (Geffen, 1988)
- 1989-90: Night Ride Home (Geffen, 1991)
- 1993: Turbulent Indigo (Reprise, 1994)
- 1997: Taming the Tiger (Reprise, 1998)
- 1999: Both Sides Now (Reprise, 2000)
- 2002: Travelogue (Nonesuch, 2002)

With Lee Morgan

- 1964: Search for the New Land (Blue Note, 1966)
- 1965: The Gigolo (Blue Note, 1968)
- 1966: Delightfulee (Blue Note, 1967)
- 1967: Standards (Blue Note, 1998)
- 1967-69: The Procrastinator (Blue Note, 1978)

With Milton Nascimento

- Milton (A&M, 1976)
- A Barca Dos Amantes (Barclay, 1986)
- Yauaretê (Columbia, 1987) – 1 track

With Jaco Pastorius

- 1975: Jaco Pastorius (Epic, 1976)
- 1980-81: Word of Mouth (Warner Bros., 1981)
- 1980-82: Holiday for Pans (Sound Hills, 1993)

With Carlos Santana

- The Swing of Delight (Columbia, 1980)[2LP]
- Spirits Dancing in the Flesh (Columbia, 1990) – guest
- Corazón (RCA, 2014)

With McCoy Tyner

- 1968: Expansions (Blue Note, 1970)
- 1970: Extensions (Blue Note, 1973)

With Joe Zawinul

- Zawinul (Atlantic, 1971) – rec. 1970
- Mauthausen - Vom großen Sterben hören (ESC, 2000) – 1 track

With others

- Donald Byrd, Free Form (Blue Note, 1966) – rec. 1961
- Billy Childs, Map to the Treasure (Sony Masterworks, 2014)
- Pino Daniele, Bella 'mbriana (EMI Italiana, 1982)
- Lou Donaldson, Lush Life (Blue Note, 1967)
- Benny Golson, Pop + Jazz = Swing (Audio Fidelity, 1962)
- Gil Evans, The Individualism of Gil Evans (Verve, 1964) – rec. 1963-64
- Don Henley, The End of the Innocence (Geffen, 1989) – rec. 1987-89
- Toninho Horta, Diamond Land (Verve Forecast, 1988)
- Norah Jones, Day Breaks (Blue Note, 2016) – rec. 2015
- J.J. Johnson, Heroes (Verve, 1998) – rec. 1996
- Wynton Kelly, Kelly Great (Vee Jay, 1959)
- Michael Landau, Tales From The Bulge (Shobi Corporation, 1990)
- Bill Laswell, Bahia Black Ritual Beating System (Axiom, 1992)
- Lionel Loueke, Karibu (Blue Note, 2008) – rec. 2007
- Grachan Moncur III, Some Other Stuff (Blue Note, 1965) – rec. 1964
- Michel Petrucciani, The Power of Three (Blue Note, 1987) – rec. 1986
- The Rolling Stones, Bridges to Babylon (Virgin, 1997) – 1 track
- Masahiko Satoh, Randooga (Epic, 1990) – live
- John Scofield, Quiet (Verve, 1996)
- Esperanza Spalding, Songwrights Apothecary Lab (Concord, 2021)
- Steely Dan, Aja (ABC, 1977) – 1 track
- Bobby Timmons, The Soul Man! (Prestige, 1966)
- Kazumi Watanabe, Kilowatt (Gramavision, 1989)
- Buster Williams, Something More (In+Out, 1989)
- Tony Williams, Spring (Blue Note, 1966) – rec. 1965
