= Lee Morgan discography =

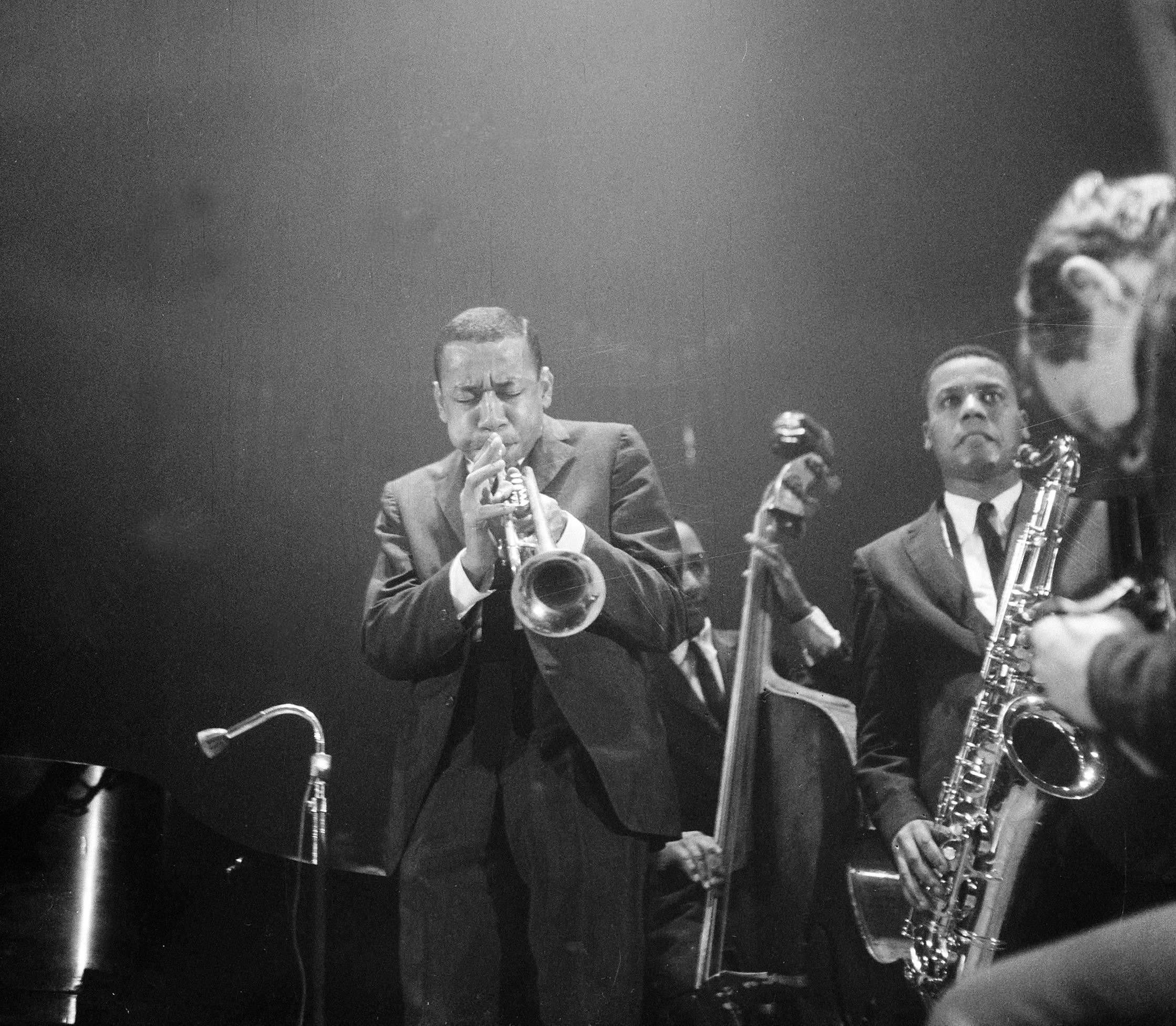
- Morgan at the Concertgebouw, Amsterdam, in 1959
- Studio albums: 31
- With Art Blakey and the Jazz Messengers: 27

This discography presents albums by jazz trumpeter Lee Morgan, groups he was a member of, and albums by other artists to which he made a significant contribution.

== Discography ==
=== As leader/co-leader ===
The early original numbers of the Blue Note catalogue had four digits and the prefix "BLP" for mono recordings and "BST" with an added "8" put in front of the numbers for stereo recordings. Beginning with the 1969 album Charisma, all releases by Lee Morgan were issued exclusively in stereo. The 1998 release Standards was issued exclusively in digital form (as CD and later as download) only. For the digital and other re-releases with added bonus material, like alternate takes and expanded liner notes, consult the articles on the individual albums.

Recording date	Title	Label (original cat. nr.)	Year released	Notes
1956-11	Lee Morgan Indeed!	Blue Note BLP 1538 (mono)	1957	Quintet with Clarence Sharpe (as), Horace Silver (p), Wilbur Ware (b), Philly Joe Jones (dr)
1956-11	Introducing Lee Morgan	Savoy MG 12091 (mono)	1956	Quintet with Hank Mobley (ts), Hank Jones (p), Doug Watkins (b), Art Taylor (dr)
1956-12	Lee Morgan Sextet a.k.a. Lee Morgan, Vol. 2	Blue Note BLP 1541	1957	Sextet with H. Mobley, Kenny Rodgers (as) H. Silver, Paul Chambers (b), Charlie Persip (dr)
1957-02	Dizzy Atmosphere	Specialty SP-2110 (mono), SP-5001 (stereo)	1957	Septet with Al Grey (tb), Billy Mitchell (ts), Billy Root (bs), Wynton Kelly (p), Paul West (b), Ch. Persip (dr), Benny Golson and Roger Spotts (arrangements)
1957-03	Lee Morgan, Vol. 3	Blue Note BLP 1557	1957	Sextet with Gigi Gryce (as, fl), Benny Golson (ts), W. Kelly (p), P. Chambers (b), Ch. Persip (dr)
1957-08	City Lights	Blue Note BLP 1575	1958	Sextet with Curtis Fuller (tb), George Coleman (ts, as), Ray Bryant (p), P. Chambers, A. Taylor
1957-09	The Cooker	Blue Note BLP 1578	1958	Quintet with Pepper Adams (b), Bobby Timmons (p), P. Chambers, Ph. J. Jones
1957-11, 1958-02	Candy	Blue Note BLP 1590	1958	Quartet with Sonny Clark (p), D Watkins, A. Taylor
1958-02	Peckin' Time co-led by Hank Mobley	Blue Note BLP 1574	1959	Quintet with H. Mobley, W. Kelly, P. Chambers, Ch. Persip
1960-04	Here's Lee Morgan	Vee-Jay VJLP 3007	1960	Quintet with Clifford Jordan (ts), W. Kelly, P. Chambers, Art Blakey (dr)
1960-04	Lee-Way	Blue Note BLP 4034	1961	Quartet with Jackie McLean (as), B. Timmons, P. Chambers, A. Blakey
1960-10	Expoobident	Vee-Jay VJLP 3015	1961	Quartet with Cl. Jordan, Eddie Higgins (p), Art Davis (b), Art Blakey
1962-01	Take Twelve	Jazzland JLP 80 (m), JLP 980 (st)	1962	Quartet with Cl. Jordan, Barry Harris - p), Bob Cranshaw - b), Louis Hayes - dr)
1963-12	The Sidewinder	Blue Note BLP 4157, BST 84157	1964	Quintet with Joe Henderson (ts), B. Harris, B. Cranshaw, Billy Higgins (dr)
1964-02	Search for the New Land	Blue Note BLP 4169, BST 84169	1966	Sextet with Wayne Shorter (ts), Herbie Hancock (p), Grant Green (g), Reggie Workman (b), B. Higgins
1964-08	Tom Cat	Blue Note LT-1058	1980	Sextet with C. Fuller, J. McLean, McCoy Tyner (p), B. Cranshaw, A. Blakey
1965-04	The Rumproller	Blue Note BLP 4199, BST 84199	1966	Quintet with J. Henderson, Ronnie Mathews (p), Victor Sproles (b), B. Higgins
1965-06, 1965-07	The Gigolo	Blue Note BLP 4212, BST 84212	1968	Quintet with W. Shorter, Harold Mabern (p), B. Cranshaw, B. Higgins
1965-09	Cornbread	Blue Note BLP 4222, BST 84222	1967	Sextet with J. McLean, H. Mobley, H. Hancock, Larry Ridley (b), B. Higgins
1965-11	Infinity	Blue Note LT-1091	1981	Quintet with J. McLean, Larry Willis (p), R. Workman, B. Higgins
1966-04^{1}, 1966-05^{2}	Delightfulee	Blue Note BLP 4243, BST 84243	1967	Big band^{2}, arranged by Oliver Nelson, with Ernie Royal (tp), Tom McIntosh (tb), Jim Buffington (Frh), Don Butterfield (tu), Phil Woods (as, fl), W. Shorter, Danny Bank (bs, bcl, fl), M. Tyner, B. Cranshaw, Ph. J. Jones; and four quintet tracks^{1} with J. Henderson, M.Tyner, B. Cranshaw, B. Higgins
1966-09	Charisma	Blue Note BST 84312	1969	Sextet with J. McLean, H. Mobley, Cedar Walton (p), P. Chambers, B. Higgins
1966-11	The Rajah	Blue Note BST 84426	1985	Quintet with H. Mobley, C. Walton, P. Chambers, B. Higgins
1967-01	Standards	Blue Note CDP 7243 8 23213 2 3	1998	Septet arranged by Duke Pearson with James Spaulding as, fl), W. Shorter, P. Adams, H. Hancock, Ron Carter (b), Mickey Roker (dr)
1967-04	Sonic Boom	Blue Note LT-987	1979	Quintet with David "Fathead" Newman (ts), C. Walton, R. Carter, B. Higgins. Digital reissue in 2003 included sextet sessions from September and October 1969, first released a year before in 1978 on The Procrastinator (=next entry).
1967-07, 1969-09, 1969-10	The Procrastinator	Blue Note BN-LA582-J2	1978	Sextet with Wayne Shorter, Bobby Hutcherson (vib), H. Hancock, R. Carter, B. Higgins; Sept and Oct sessions with Julian Priester (tb), G. Coleman, H. Mabern, Walter Booker (b), M. Roker (See also note to previous Sonic Boom.)
1967-11, (1968-09)	The Sixth Sense	Blue Note BST 84335	1970	Sextet with J. McLean, Frank Mitchell (ts), C. Walton, V. Sproles, B, Higgins; Sept date on 1999 digital reissue are three tracks with same personnel except H. Mabern (p) and Mickey Bass (b)
1968-02	Taru	Blue Note LT-1031	1980	Sextet with Bennie Maupin (ts), John Hicks (p), George Benson (g), R. Workman, B. Higgins
1968-05	Caramba!	Blue Note BST 84289	1968	Quintet arranged by Cal Massey with B. Maupin, C. Walton, R. Workman, B. Higgins
1970-07	Live at the Lighthouse	Blue Note BST 89906	1971	Quintet with L. Morgan (tp, flh), B. Maupin (ts, fl, bcl), H. Mabern, Jymie Merritt (el.upr.bass), M. Roker (replaced by Jack DeJohnette on one track)
1971-09	The Last Session	Blue Note BST 84901	1972	Octet with Grachan Moncur III (tb), Bobbi Humphrey (fl), Billy Harper (ts, afl), H. Mabern (p, elp), R. Workman (b, perc), J. Merritt, Freddie Waits (dr, recorder)

=== As a member of Art Blakey's bands ===
During his lifetime, 20 albums (omitting the recordings issued in several volumes) alone were released with Art Blakey and a line-up featuring Lee Morgan; another seven followed after his death in 1972. For the most part, Morgan was a member of Art Blakey and his Jazz Messengers, which consisted of, for the time, Morgan on trumpet, tenor saxophonist Wayne Shorter, pianist Bobby Timmons (and sometimes Walter Davis Jr.), bassist Jymie Merritt, and the bandleader, Blakey, on drums. Morgan was recorded with the band from October 1958 until May 1965. Although he and Bobby Timmons left the Messengers already in mid-1961, while Freddie Hubbard and Cedar Walton joined the band (their first recording was Mosaic).

Recording date	Album title	Label	Year Released	Notes
1958-10	Moanin'	Blue Note BLP 4003, BST 4003	1959	
1958-11, 1958-12	1958 – Paris Olympia	Fontana (F) 680.202 ML	1959	
1958-11	Drums Around the Corner	Blue Note 21455	1999	just Art Blakey written on the cover
1958-12	Des femmes disparaissent	Fontana (F) 660 224 MR	1959	soundtrack
1958-12	Au club St. Germain, Vols. 1–3	RCA France 430-043–045	1960	live recorded at Club Saint-Germain, issued on 3 LPs with four tracks each, Vol. 3 "plus Kenny Clarke"
1959-03	Just Coolin'	Blue Note 64201	2020	
1959-04	At the Jazz Corner of the World, Vols. 1 & 2	Blue Note BLP 4015 & 4016	1959	[2LP] released separately
1959-07	Les Liaisons dangereuses 1960	Fontana 680 203 TL	1960	soundtrack; with Barney Wilen as guest, Morgan plays cornet throughout
1959-11	Africaine	Blue Note LT 1088	1981	
1959-11	Art Blakey et les Jazz Messengers au Théâtre des Champs-Élysées	RCA France 430.054	1960	live recorded at Théâtre des Champs-Élysées, Paris
1959-12	Paris Jam Session	Fontana (F) 680 207 TL	1960	live recorded at Théâtre des Champs-Élysées, with Walter Davis Jr. on piano; Bud Powell and Barney Wilen as guests on first two of four tracks
1960-03	The Big Beat	Blue Note BLP 4029, BST 84029	1960	
1960-08	A Night in Tunisia	Blue Note BLP 4049, BST 84049	1961	
1960-08	Like Someone in Love	Blue Note BLP 4245, BST 84245	1967	
1960-09	Meet You at the Jazz Corner of the World, Vols. 1 & 2	Blue Note BLP 4054 & 4055	1961 & 1962	live recorded at the Birdland, New York; [2LP] released separately
1961-01	A Day with Art Blakey 1961	Baybridge (Japan) UPS-2148~9-B (mono)	1981	[2LP] live recorded at Sankei Hall, Tokyo
1961-01	First Flight to Tokyo: The Lost 1961 Recordings	Blue Note BN 2801	2021	live recorded at Hibiya Public Hall, Tokyo; first released in 2014 as Tokyo 1961 – The Complete Concerts on Solar
1961-02, 1961-05	The Freedom Rider	Blue Note BLP 4156, BST 84156	1964	
1961-02, 1961-05	Roots & Herbs	Blue Note BST 84347	1970	recording with Walter Davis Jr. replacing Timmons on two tracks
1961-02, 1961-05	Pisces	Blue Note GXF 3060	1979	remaining Jazz Messengers recordings of the two dates released in part on The Freedom Rider and Roots & Herbs (added 1964 date with Curtis Fuller on trombone instead of Morgan); album with only Art Blakey written on the cover
1961-03	The Witch Doctor	Blue Note BST 84258	1967	
1961-05	Art Blakey and The Jazz Messengers Featuring Wayne Shorter – Olympia–May 13, 1961	Trema (F)710373/710374	1992	[2LP] live recording at the Olympia, Paris
1961-06	Art Blakey!!!!! Jazz Messengers!!!!!	Impulse! A-7 (mono), AS-7 (stereo)	1961	first Messengers album as a sextet with Curtis Fuller on trombone
1963	Play Selections from the New Musical Golden Boy	Colpix CP 478 (mono), SCP 478 (stereo)	1963	recorded for Golden Boy as nonet with expanded horn section arranged by Shorter, Fuller and pianist Cedar Walton
1964-04; 1964-05	Indestructible	Blue Note BST 84193	1966	
1964-11	'S Make It	Limelight LM & LS 86001	1965	recorded in Los Angeles with partly new line-up, beside Morgan and Fuller, John Gilmore (tenor sax), John Hicks (piano), and Victor Sproles (bass)
1965-05	Soul Finger	Limelight LM 82018	1965	with second trumpeter Freddie Hubbard and completely new line-up, with Gary Bartz (alto saxophone), Lucky Thompson (soprano sax), Hicks and Sproles; a last track ("Slowly but Surely") from the session on Hold On, I'm Coming (Limelight, 1966)

=== As sideman ===
With Charles Earland

- Intensity (Prestige, 1972) – Lee Morgan's last recording
- Charles III (Prestige, 1973) – rec. 1972–1973
- Funk Fantastique (Prestige, 2004) – rec. 1971–1973

With Curtis Fuller

- Sliding Easy (United Artists, 1959)
- The Curtis Fuller Jazztet (Savoy, 1959)
- Images of Curtis Fuller (Savoy, 1960)

With Dizzy Gillespie

- Dizzy in Greece (Verve, 1957) – rec. 1956–1957
- Birks' Works (Verve, 1957)
- Dizzy Gillespie at Newport (Verve, 1957)

With Andrew Hill

- Grass Roots (Blue Note, 1968)
- Lift Every Voice (Blue Note, 1970) – rec. 1969–1970

With Clifford Jordan

- Cliff Jordan (Blue Note, 1957)
- Live in Baltimore (Fresh Sound, 2003) – rec. 1968

With Jackie McLean

- Jacknife (Blue Note, 1975) – rec. 1965–1966
- Consequence (Blue Note, 1979) – rec. 1965

With Hank Mobley

- 1956: Hank Mobley Sextet (Blue Note, 1957)
- 1956: The Jazz Message of Hank Mobley, Vol. 2 (Savoy, 1957)
- 1958: Monday Night at Birdland also with Curtis Fuller and Billy Root (Roulette, 1958)
- 1958: Another Monday Night at Birdland also with Curtis Fuller and Billy Root (Roulette, 1958)
- 1963: No Room for Squares (Blue Note, 1964)
- 1965: Dippin' (Blue Note, 1966)
- 1965: A Caddy for Daddy (Blue Note, 1967)
- 1966: A Slice of the Top (Blue Note, 1979)
- 1963–66: Straight No Filter (Blue Note, 1985)
- 1967: Third Season (Blue Note, 1980)

With Wayne Shorter

- Introducing Wayne Shorter (Vee Jay, 1960) – rec. 1959
- Night Dreamer (Blue Note, 1964)

With Jimmy Smith

- 1957: Confirmation (Blue Note, 1979)
- 1957–1958: House Party (Blue Note, 1958)
- 1957–1958: The Sermon! (Blue Note, 1959)

With Lonnie Smith

- Think! (Blue Note, 1969) – rec. 1968
- Turning Point (Blue Note, 1969)

With others

- Ahmed Abdul-Malik, East Meets West (RCA Victor, 1960)
- Tina Brooks, Minor Move (Blue Note, 1980)
- John Coltrane, Blue Train (Blue Note, 1958)
- Buddy DeFranco, Blues Bag (Vee Jay, 1965)
- Art Farmer, Brass Shout (United Artists, 1981)
- Benny Golson, Benny Golson and the Philadelphians (United Artists, 1958)
- Johnny Griffin, A Blowin' Session (Blue Note, 1957)
- Joe Henderson, Mode for Joe (Blue Note, 1966)
- Ernie Henry, Last Chorus (Riverside, 1958)
- Freddie Hubbard, The Night of the Cookers (Blue Note, 1965)[2LP]
- Bobbi Humphrey, Flute-In (Blue Note, 1971)
- Elvin Jones, The Prime Element (Blue Note, 1976)[2LP]
- Philly Joe Jones, Drums Around the World (Riverside, 1959)
- Quincy Jones, The Great Wide World of Quincy Jones (Mercury, 1959)
- Wynton Kelly, Kelly Great (Vee Jay, 1959)
- Harold Mabern, Greasy Kid Stuff! (Prestige, 1970)
- Grachan Moncur III, Evolution (Blue Note, 1964)
- Stanley Turrentine, Mr. Natural (Blue Note, 1980)
- McCoy Tyner, Tender Moments (Blue Note, 1968)
- Jack Wilson, Easterly Winds (Blue Note, 1968)
- Reuben Wilson, Love Bug (Blue Note, 1969)
- Larry Young, Mother Ship (Blue Note, 1980)
- The Young Lions, The Young Lions (Vee Jay, 1961)
