= Holiday Soul =

Holiday Soul could refer to either of the following two albums of Christmas music released on the Prestige label:

- Holiday Soul (Bobby Timmons album)
- Holiday Soul (Don Patterson album)
