= Bishop JC White =

Gospel singer and songwriter

John Carlton (J.C.) White (born July 28, 1939) is a Gospel singer/songwriter who recorded between 1962 and 2007. His most noted composition "Stretch Out" was widely covered by choirs and solo artists alike. His original songs also include "Talk It Over with Jesus" "Keys to the Kingdom" "II Chronicles" "Satisfied with Jesus" "Lord Touch Somebody" and many others. He also wrote and recorded "Right Now if you Believe" with Chicago Mass Choir.

Bishop White is known most for being the head songwriter and director for Institutional Radio Choir and leader of the JC White Singers (Anderson 102). He led the choir from 1954-1979, premiering with the choir on Shirley Caesar's debut album "My Testimony" and "I'll Go." He resigned in 1979 when he began pastoring in Bridgeport, Connecticut. He was also the pastor of the gospel group, JJ Hairston and Youthful Praise

Bishop White is a native of Brooklyn, New York and was raised in the Institutional Church of God in Christ Int'l under his uncle, Bishop CE Williams Sr. He began pastoring Turner's Faith Temple in Bridgeport in 1979 and has been a resident of Connecticut since then. He was the instructor of the Dartmouth Gospel Choir for nearly 10 years of Dartmouth College.

White's most noted album is his 1971 Jazz-Gospel fusion with drummer Max Roach titled Lift Every Voice and Sing (album) (Ballet 446). Bishop White has appeared on over 40 albums as singer, songwriter and producer. He resides in Connecticut as pastor of Cathedral of Praise Church of God in Christ, International. He is also the Presiding Prelate of the Church of God in Christ International .

Most recently, he published a book titled "Messages Behind the Melodies" which recounts the stories and Scriptures behind his most noted songs

He and his wife Gloria have been married 60 years and they are the parents of five children. His daughter Trina is married to Gospel Artist, JJ Hairston.

== Discography (38 Albums) ==
- Well Done (Faith, 1962)
- I'll Go w/ Shirley Caesar
- My Testimony w/ Shirley Caesar feat. Stretch Out
- Stretch Out, later released as He Holdeth the Reins (1966, HOB)
- Walk with Me, Lord w/ 32nd COGIC Youth Congress (1967, HOB)
- Gospel Blessed with Soul (1967, Atlantic)
- Institutional Children’s Gospel Choir (1967, Veep)
- Hold Out w/ 33rd COGIC Youth Congress (1968, HOB)
- Grace (1968, Atlantic and later on Cottillion)
- This Is the Right Time (1970, King)
- Lift Every Voice and Sing (album) (1971)
- One More Day (Zanzee, 1972)
- Glory to Glory (1974)
- By Your Side w/ JC White Singers (1974)
- Jubilee at Yale University (1975)
- Live: This Is the Answer or Top of the Mountain (Savoy, 1976)
- Reflections of Divine Love w/ JC White Singers (Locus, 1976)
- He's Standing By (Savoy, 1977)
- Phase One (Savoy, 1977)
- Come Alive w/ JC White Singers (Savoy, 1978)
- Say Something for the Lord (1978)
- 25th Anniversary: Believe (1979)
- I’ll Show You The Way w/ JC White Singers (Savoy, 1979)
- New Life, New Love (1981)
- Come Out Here to Stay Lord (1982)
- Stay In the Race w/ Hempstead Community Choir (1982)
- We Must Be Real w/ Connecticut Deliverance Mass Choir (1984)
- It's Praying Time (1985)
- Reunion (1987)
- Music and Arts Seminar w/ Edwin Hawkins: Live in Washington, DC (1988)
- East Coast Music and Arts w/ Edwin Hawkins (1990)
- Feel Like Pressing My Way (1990)
- I Love Him w/ TFT Mass Choir (1991)
- Right Now If You Believe w/ Chicago Mass Choir (1991)
- I Will Give You Praise (1996)
- After the Rapture (1998)
- Just Have Church (2003)
- Live! The Praise! The Worship! W/ JJ Hairston and Youthful Praise (Songwriting Credit: “I Am Your Help” 2005)
- Exalted: Live in Baltimore w/ JJ Hairston and Youthful Praise (Songwriting Credit: “Satisfied” 2007)
