= Drums Unlimited =

Studio album by Max Roach
- Released: 1966
- Recorded: October 14 & 20, 1965 | April 25, 1966
- Studios: Atlantic Studios; New York City, NY
- Genre: Jazz
- Length: 41:27
- Labels: Atlantic; LP 1467
- Producer: Arif Mardin

Max Roach chronology
The Max Roach Trio featuring the Legendary Hasaan (1964)	Drums Unlimited (1966)	Members, Don't Git Weary (1968)

Drums Unlimited is an album by American jazz drummer Max Roach recorded in 1965 and 1966 and released on the Atlantic label.

== Reception ==
Professional ratings
Review scores
Source	Rating
Allmusic	4/5 stars
The Rolling Stone Jazz Record Guide	3/5 stars
The Penguin Guide to Jazz Recordings	3.5/4 stars
Tom Hull	B+

Allmusic awarded the album 4 stars and its review by Scott Yanow states, "essentially advanced hard-bop with a generous amount of space taken up by Roach's drum solos... because of the melodic and logically-planned nature of his improvisations, they continually hold on to one's attention".

== Track listing ==
All compositions by Max Roach except as indicated

1. "The Drum Also Waltzes" - 3:34
2. "Nommo" (Jymie Merritt) - 12:43
3. "Drums Unlimited" - 4:23
4. "St. Louis Blues" (W.C. Handy) - 5:22
5. "For Big Sid" - 3:04
6. "In the Red (A Christmas Carol)" - 12:21
- Recorded in New York on October 14, 1965 (tracks 1 & 4), October 20, 1965 (tracks 2 & 6) and April 25, 1966 (tracks 3 & 5)

== Personnel ==
- Max Roach - drums
- Freddie Hubbard - trumpet (tracks 2, 4, & 6)
- Roland Alexander - soprano saxophone (track 4)
- James Spaulding - alto saxophone (tracks 2, 4 & 6)
- Ronnie Mathews - piano (tracks 2, 4 & 6)
- Jymie Merritt - bass (tracks 2, 4 & 6)
