= Africaine =

Studio album by Art Blakey and the Jazz Messengers
- Released: 1981
- Recorded: November 10, 1959
- Studio: Van Gelder Studio, Englewood Cliffs
- Genre: Jazz
- Length: 45:25
- Label: Blue Note; LT 1088
- Producer: Alfred Lion

Art Blakey and the Jazz Messengers chronology
Les Liaisons Dangereuses 1960 (1959)	Africaine (1981)	Art Blakey et les Jazz Messengers au Théâtre des Champs-Élysées (1959)

Africaine is an album by Art Blakey and The Jazz Messengers. The session was recorded for Blue Note Records on November 10, 1959, but not released for more than 20 years, appearing on vinyl in 1981 as part of the Blue Note Classic series, and on CD for the first time in 1998.

Africaine was recorded between two of the band’s most popular studio albums, Moanin’ (recorded October 1958) and The Big Beat (recorded March 1960), a productive period during which the band also toured extensively, recorded film soundtracks in Paris, and released several live albums.

The album features tenor saxophonist Wayne Shorter in his first recording with The Jazz Messengers, trumpeter Lee Morgan, bassist Jymie Merritt, and pianist Walter Davis, Jr. (replacing Messengers’ mainstay Bobby Timmons on this session). Africaine is also notable for its African and Latin musical influences, and includes guest musician Dizzy Reece playing congas on two tracks.

== Reception ==
Professional ratings
Review scores
Source	Rating
Allmusic	4/5 stars
The Rolling Stone Jazz Record Guide	3/5 stars

In an enthusiastic review, Michael G. Nastos of Allmusic opines of the album: “one wonders the reasons why it was summarily delayed … for the quality of this music is sky high … a recording that shows a band fully able to fuse many exotically attractive elements into a unified whole of creative jazz music ecstasy.”

== Track listing ==
1. "Africaine" (Shorter) – 7:57
2. "Lester Left Town" (Shorter) – 8:35
3. "Splendid" (Davis) – 7:46
4. "Haina" (Morgan) – 10:17
5. "The Midget" (Morgan) – 6:00
6. "Celine" (Morgan) – 4:50

== Personnel ==
- Art Blakey – drums
- Lee Morgan – trumpet
- Wayne Shorter – tenor saxophone
- Walter Davis, Jr. – piano
- Jymie Merritt – acoustic bass
- Dizzy Reece – conga drums (on tracks 1 & 4)
