= In Person (Bobby Timmons album) =

Live album by Bobby Timmons
- Released: 1961
- Recorded: October 1, 1961
- Genre: Jazz
- Length: 52:16
- Label: Riverside
- Producer: Orrin Keepnews

Bobby Timmons chronology
Easy Does It (1961)	In Person (1961)	Sweet and Soulful Sounds (1962)

In Person is a live album by American jazz pianist Bobby Timmons recorded in 1961 at the Village Vanguard and released on the Riverside label.

== Reception ==
The Allmusic review by Jim Todd stated: "This enjoyable LP presents a relaxed, agreeable live date, but not one that generates sparks".

Professional ratings
Review scores
Source	Rating
The Penguin Guide to Jazz	3.5/4 stars
AllMusic	2.5/5 stars

== Track listing ==
All compositions by Bobby Timmons except as indicated

1. "Autumn Leaves" (Joseph Kosma, Johnny Mercer, Jacques Prévert) - 7:57
2. "So Tired" - 6:24
3. "Goodbye" (Gordon Jenkins) - 4:46
4. "Dat Dere (Theme)" - 0:56
5. "They Didn't Believe Me" (Jerome Kern, Herbert Reynolds) - 6:48 Bonus track on CD reissue
6. "Dat Dere" (Full-length) - 4:31 Bonus track on CD reissue
7. "Popsy" - 6:12
8. "I Didn't Know What Time It Was" (Lorenz Hart, Richard Rodgers) - 8:14
9. "Softly, As in a Morning Sunrise" (Oscar Hammerstein II, Sigmund Romberg) - 5:30
10. "Dat Dere (Theme)" - 0:56

- Recorded at the Village Vanguard in New York City on October 1, 1961.

== Personnel ==
- Bobby Timmons - piano
- Ron Carter - bass
- Albert Heath - drums
