= Do You Know the Way? =

Studio album by Bobby Timmons
- Released: 1968
- Recorded: November 1968
- Genre: Jazz
- Length: 40:35
- Label: Milestone

Bobby Timmons chronology
Got to Get It! (1967)	Do You Know the Way? (1968)

Do You Know the Way? is the final album by American jazz pianist Bobby Timmons recorded in 1968 and released on the Milestone label.

== Reception ==
The Allmusic review awarded the album 3 stars.

Professional ratings
Review scores
Source	Rating
Allmusic	3/5 stars

== Track listing ==
All compositions by Bobby Timmons except as indicated

1. "The Spanish Count" - 5:52
2. "I Won't Be Back" (Joe Beck) - 5:35
3. "Last Night When We Were Young" (Harold Arlen, Yip Harburg) - 4:24
4. "Do You Know the Way to San Jose" (Burt Bacharach, Hal David) - 4:06
5. "Come Together" - 7:40
6. "Something to Live For" (Duke Ellington, Billy Strayhorn) - 4:59
7. "Soul Time" - 4:23
8. "This Guy's in Love With You" (Bacharach, David) - 3:36
- Recorded in New York City in November 1968.

== Personnel ==
- Bobby Timmons - piano
- Joe Beck - guitar (tracks 2–5 & 8)
- Bob Cranshaw - electric bass
- Jack DeJohnette - drums
