= Sweet and Soulful Sounds =

Studio album by Bobby Timmons
- Released: 1962
- Recorded: June 18 & 19, 1962
- Genre: Jazz
- Length: 39:34
- Label: Riverside
- Producer: Orrin Keepnews

Bobby Timmons chronology
In Person (1961)	Sweet and Soulful Sounds (1962)	Born to Be Blue! (1963)

Sweet and Soulful Sounds is an album by American jazz pianist Bobby Timmons recorded in 1962 and released on the Riverside label.

== Reception ==
The AllMusic review by Stewart Mason awarded the album 4 stars stating: "Sweet and Soulful Sounds, from 1962, is a most atypical record for Bobby Timmons. Long thought of only as a funky piano player in the style that Ramsey Lewis would later make commercially successful, Timmons could also play prettily, as he does on this ballad-heavy set... This is an unusual record for Bobby Timmons, but a great one".

Professional ratings
Review scores
Source	Rating
AllMusic	4/5 stars
The Penguin Guide to Jazz	3/4 stars

== Track listing ==
All compositions by Bobby Timmons except as indicated

1. "The Sweetest Sounds" (Richard Rodgers) – 4:56
2. "Turn Left" – 5:26
3. "God Bless the Child" (Arthur Herzog, Jr., Billie Holiday) – 5:01
4. "You'd Be So Nice to Come Home To" (Cole Porter) – 4:35
5. "Another Live One" – 4:10
6. "Alone Together" (Howard Dietz, Arthur Schwartz) – 5:59
7. "Spring Can Really Hang You up the Most" (Fran Landesman, Tommy Wolf) – 3:38
8. "Why Was I Born?" (Oscar Hammerstein II, Jerome Kern) – 5:49

- Recorded at Plaza Sound Studio in New York City by Ray Fowler on June 18, 1962 (tracks 3, 4 & 7) and June 19, 1962 (tracks 1, 2, 5, 6 & 8).

== Personnel ==
- Bobby Timmons – piano
- Sam Jones – bass
- Roy McCurdy – drums
