= Members, Don't Git Weary =

Studio album by Max Roach
- Released: 1968
- Recorded: June 25–26, 1968
- Studio: RCA Studio B (New York City)
- Genre: Jazz
- Length: 31:17
- Label: Atlantic (SD 1510)
- Producer: Joel Dorn

Max Roach chronology
| Drums Unlimited (1965–66) | Members, Don't Git Weary (1968) | Lift Every Voice and Sing (1971) |

Members, Don't Git Weary is an album by American jazz drummer Max Roach recorded in 1968 and released on the Atlantic label.

== Reception ==
Professional ratings
Review scores
| Source | Rating |
|---|---|
| AllMusic | 4/5 stars |
| The Penguin Guide to Jazz Recordings | 3/4 stars |
| Tom Hull | B+ |

AllMusic awarded the album 4 stars and the review by Alex Henderson calls it "One of the finest post-bop dates Roach recorded during that decade".

== Track listing ==
All compositions by Stanley Cowell except as indicated

1. "Abstrutions" – 3:40
2. "Libra" (Gary Bartz) – 4:58
3. "Effi" – 6:15
4. "Equipoise" – 6:22
5. "Members, Don't Git Weary" (Max Roach) – 5:32
6. "Absolutions" (Jymie Merritt) – 4:39
- Recorded at RCA Studio B in New York on June 25 (tracks 2–4 & 6) and June 26 (tracks 1 & 5), 1968

== Personnel ==
=== Musicians ===
- Max Roach – drums
- Charles Tolliver – trumpet
- Gary Bartz – alto saxophone
- Stanley Cowell – piano, electric piano
- Jymie Merritt – electric bass
- Andy Bey – vocals (track 5)

=== Technical ===
- Joel Dorn – producer
- Paul Goodman – recording engineer
- Chuck Stewart – cover photo
- Haig Adishian – cover design
