= Drums Around the Corner =

Compilation album by Art Blakey
- Released: October 19, 1999
- Recorded: November 2, 1958; March 29, 1959
- Studio: Manhattan Towers (NYC); Van Gelder Studio, Hackensack
- Genre: Jazz
- Length: 72:36
- Label: Blue Note; Blue Note 21455
- Producer: Alfred Lion

Art Blakey chronology
Moanin' (1958)	Drums Around the Corner (1999)	Holiday for Skins (1958)

Professional ratings
Review scores
Source	Rating
AllMusic	3.5/5 stars

Drums around the Corner is a posthumous album by Art Blakey recorded in 1958 and 1959, but not released until 1999.

The album was cut from two sessions. The main session, recorded by Rudy Van Gelder at Manhattan Towers, New York City on November 2, 1958, is effectively a showcase for an all-star lineup drummers consisting of Blakey, Philly Joe Jones, Roy Haynes and Ray Barretto (on congas). They are supported by the regular members of the Jazz Messengers at the time, Lee Morgan (trumpet), Bobby Timmons (piano) and Jymie Merritt (bass).

The later session was a duet between Blakey and bassist Paul Chambers, recorded at the Van Gelder Studio in Hackensack, NJ on March 29, 1959.

== Track listing ==
All tracks are written by Art Blakey except as noted.

No.	Title	Writer(s)	Length
1.	"Moose the Mooche"	Charlie Parker	15:19
2.	"Blakey's Blues"		11:07
3.	"Lee's Tune"	Lee Morgan	8:26
4.	"Let's Take 16 Bars"		6:13
5.	"Drums in the Rain"		11:13
6.	"Lover"	Richard Rodgers; Lorenz Hart	7:24
7.	"I've Got My Love to Keep Me Warm"	Irving Berlin	7:11
8.	"What Is This Thing Called Love?"	Cole Porter	5:43
Total length:			1:12:36

== Personnel ==
November 2, 1958 (Tracks 1–6)

- Art Blakey – drums, timpani
- Lee Morgan – trumpet
- Bobby Timmons – piano
- Jymie Merritt – bass
- Philly Joe Jones – drums, timpani
- Roy Haynes – drums
- Ray Barretto – congas
  - Recorded at Manhattan Towers, NYC

March 29, 1959 (Tracks 7–8)

- Paul Chambers – bass
- Art Blakey – drums
  - Recorded at Van Gelder Studio, Hackensack, New Jersey
