= The Cannonball Adderley Quintet in San Francisco =

Live album by The Cannonball Adderley Quintet
- Released: 1959
- Recorded: October 18 & 20, 1959; The Jazz Workshop, San Francisco
- Genre: Jazz
- Length: 60:32 excluding alt. takes
- Label: Riverside; RLP 12-311
- Producer: Orrin Keepnews

The Cannonball Adderley Quintet chronology
Cannonball Takes Charge (1959)	The Cannonball Adderley Quintet in San Francisco (1959)	Them Dirty Blues (1960)

The Cannonball Adderley Quintet in San Francisco is a 1959 album by The Cannonball Adderley Quintet.

The groundbreaking album launched "soul jazz", according to NPR, bridging "the gap between bebop and funk". Originally released by Riverside Records, the album has been reissued on CD several times since 1991 by Riverside and OJC. Remastered versions of the album include extended cuts of several of the songs on the original, including the retitled "(A Few Words by Cannonball...And) This Here".

== Background ==
The album was recorded at The Jazz Workshop in San Francisco before an appreciative standing-room only crowd. The album broke new ground as a live recording taped in noisy club environments, creating a formula that not only the Cannonball Quintet but other jazz ensembles would follow. Producer Orrin Keepnews reflected that it "was such a phenomenal success that not only did I do a lot of such recordings afterwards, but I think that virtually all jazz producers felt that it was a good thing to do". Also unusual for the time was Keepnews' decision to retain Adderley's comments to the crowd.

== Reception ==
Producer and jazz critic Orrin Keepnews described the album as "the birth of contemporary live recording" and in May 1960, Time noted that the album's then 50,000 copies sold was "phenomenal for a jazz record", raising the album to the bestseller charts. Music critic Scott Yanow describes the album as a "gem [...] essential for all jazz collections." The Penguin Guide to Jazz awarded the album 3 stars, stating: "In San Francisco is a little overstretched, with four tracks nudging the 12-minute mark and some of the solos running out of steam too soon".

Professional ratings
Review scores
Source	Rating
AllMusic	4.5/5 stars
DownBeat	2.5/5 stars
The Penguin Guide to Jazz	3/4 stars

== Track listing ==
1. "This Here" (Bobby Timmons) – 12:29
2. "Spontaneous Combustion" (Cannonball Adderley) – 11:55
3. "Hi-Fly" (Randy Weston) – 11:09
4. "You Got It!" (Cannonball Adderley) – 5:10
5. "Bohemia After Dark" (Oscar Pettiford) – 8:06
6. "Straight, No Chaser" (Thelonious Monk) – 11:43 (2000 Bonus Track; 2007 Bonus Track)
7. "This Here [Alternate Take]"– 11:40 (2007 Bonus Track)
8. "You Got It! [Alternate Take]" – 6:11 (2007 Bonus Track)

== Personnel ==
Musicians

- Cannonball Adderley – alto saxophone
- Nat Adderley – cornet
- Bobby Timmons – piano
- Sam Jones – bass
- Louis Hayes – drums

Production

- Orrin Keepnews – producer
- Reice Hamel – engineer
- Kirk Felton – digital remastering
- Paul Bacon – design
- Ken Braren – design
- Harris Lewine – design
- Ralph J. Gleason – liner notes
