= Soul Food (Bobby Timmons album) =

Studio album by Bobby Timmons
- Released: 1966
- Recorded: September 30 & October 14, 1966
- Studio: Van Gelder Studio, Englewood Cliffs, NJ
- Genre: Jazz
- Length: 38:49
- Label: Prestige
- Producer: Cal Lampley

Bobby Timmons chronology
The Soul Man! (1966)	Soul Food (1966)	Got to Get It! (1967)

Soul Food is an album by American jazz pianist Bobby Timmons recorded in 1966 and released on the Prestige label.

== Reception ==
The Allmusic review awarded the album 3 stars.

Professional ratings
Review scores
Source	Rating
Allmusic	3/5 stars
The Rolling Stone Jazz Record Guide	3/5 stars

== Track listing ==
All compositions by Bobby Timmons except as noted

1. "Souce Meat" – 4:06
2. "Turkey Wings" – 5:35
3. "Cracklin' Bread" – 4:55
4. "Make Someone Happy" (Betty Comden, Adolph Green, Jule Styne) – 6:33
5. "Giblets" – 6:11
6. "Angel Eyes" (Earl Brent, Matt Dennis) – 5:44
7. "Stolen Sweets" (Wild Bill Davis, Dickie Thompson) – 5:45

- Recorded at Rudy Van Gelder Studio in Englewood Cliffs, New Jersey on September 30 (tracks 2, 3, 5 & 6) and October 14 (tracks 1, 4 & 7), 1966.

== Personnel ==
- Bobby Timmons – piano
- Mickey Bass – bass
- Billy Higgins – drums
