= Chicken & Dumplin's =

Studio album by Bobby Timmons
- Released: 1965
- Recorded: July 12, 1965
- Studio: Rudy Van Gelder Studio in Englewood Cliffs, New Jersey
- Genre: Jazz
- Length: 41:18
- Label: Prestige
- Producer: Cal Lampley

Bobby Timmons chronology
Holiday Soul (1964)	Chicken & Dumplin's (1965)	The Soul Man! (1966)

Chicken & Dumplin's is an album by American jazz pianist Bobby Timmons recorded in 1965 and released on the Prestige label.

== Reception ==
The Allmusic review awarded the album 3 stars.

Professional ratings
Review scores
Source	Rating
Allmusic	3/5 stars

== Track listing ==
1. "Chicken & Dumplin's" (Ray Bryant) – 7:45
2. "The Return of Gengis Khan" (Bobby Timmons)– 14:15
3. "The Telephone Song" (Roberto Menescal, Ronaldo Boscoli, Norman Gimbel) – 4:25
4. "A Sunday Kind of Love" (Barbara Belle, Anita Leonard, Louis Prima, Stanley Rhodes) – 6:15
5. "Ray's Idea" (Dizzy Gillespie, Gil Fuller) – 8:38

== Personnel ==
- Bobby Timmons – piano, vibes
- Mickey Bass – bass
- Billy Saunders – drums
