= Got to Get It! =

Studio album by Bobby Timmons
- Released: 1967
- Recorded: November 20 & 21 and December 4, 1967
- Genre: Jazz
- Length: 37:32
- Label: Milestone

Bobby Timmons chronology
Soul Food (1966)	Got to Get It! (1967)	Do You Know the Way? (1968)

Got to Get It! is an album by American jazz pianist Bobby Timmons recorded in 1967 and released on the Milestone label.

== Reception ==
The Allmusic review by Jason Ankeny awarded the album 3 stars stating "Purists may blanch, but Bobby Timmons' Milestone label debut Got to Get It! is an otherwise incendiary soul-jazz date informed by an irresistible freewheeling wit, absent from the pianist's more conventionally noteworthy efforts".

Professional ratings
Review scores
Source	Rating
Allmusic	3/5 stars

== Track listing ==
All compositions by Bobby Timmons except as indicated

1. "If You Ain't Got It (I Got to Get It Somewhere)" (Tom McIntosh) - 3:14
2. "Up, Up and Away" (Jimmy Webb) - 4:06
3. "Travelin' Light" (Jimmy Mundy, Trummy Young, Johnny Mercer) - 5:06
4. "Come Sunday" (Duke Ellington) - 3:02
5. "One Down" - 4:42
6. "So Tired" - 2:54
7. "Here's That Rainy Day" (Johnny Burke, Jimmy Van Heusen) - 3:22
8. "Straight, No Chaser" (Thelonious Monk) - 6:04
9. "Booker's Bossa" (Walter Booker, Cedar Walton) - 5:02

- Recorded at Plaza Sound Studios, New York City on November 20 (tracks 1, 4 & 6), November 21 (tracks 2 & 8), and December 4 (tracks 3, 5, 7 & 9), 1967.

== Personnel ==
- Bobby Timmons - piano
- Jimmy Owens - trumpet, flugelhorn (tracks 1, 2, 4, 6 & 8)
- Hubert Laws - flute (tracks 1, 2, 4, 6 & 8)
- Joe Farrell, James Moody - flute, tenor saxophone (tracks 1, 2, 4, 6 & 8)
- George Barrow - baritone saxophone
- Joe Beck (tracks 3, 5, 7 & 9), Howard Collins (tracks 2 & 8), Eric Gale (tracks 1, 4 & 6) - guitar
- Ron Carter - bass
- Jimmy Cobb (tracks 2, 3, 5 & 7–9), Billy Higgins (tracks 1, 4 & 6) - drums
- Tom McIntosh - arranger, conductor (tracks 1, 2, 4, 6 & 8)
- Unidentified voices (tracks 1, 4 & 6)
