= Jymie Merritt =

American jazz double-bassist (1926–2020)

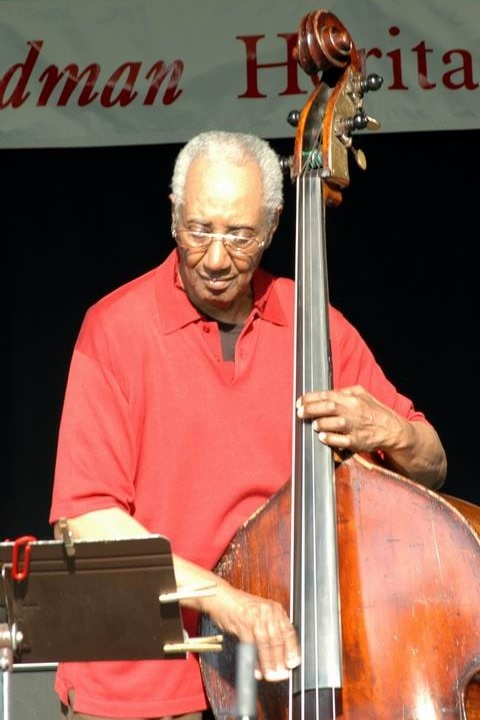
- Merritt in 2008 at the annual Don Redman Heritage Awards, Harpers Ferry, West Virginia

Background information
- Born: May 3, 1926; Philadelphia, Pennsylvania, U.S.
- Died: April 10, 2020 (aged 93) Philadelphia, Pennsylvania, U.S.
- Genre: Jazz
- Occupations: Instrumentalist; bandleader; composer
- Instruments: Double bass; electric bass

Jymie Merritt (/dʒɪmi/; May 3, 1926 – April 10, 2020) was an American jazz bassist, bandleader, and composer. Merritt was a member of Art Blakey's Jazz Messengers group from 1957 until 1962. The same year he left Blakey's band, Merritt formed his own group, the Forerunners, which he led sporadically until his death in 2020. Merritt also worked as a sideman for blues and jazz musicians such as Bull Moose Jackson, B.B. King, Chet Baker, Max Roach, Dizzy Gillespie, and Lee Morgan.

== Early life ==
Born and raised in Philadelphia, Jymie Merritt, born James Raleigh Merritt, was the son of Agnes Merritt (née Robinson), a choral director, voice and piano teacher, and Raleigh Howard "RH" Merritt, a businessman and author. After serving in the U.S. Army during World War II from 1944 to 1946, Jymie returned home to work for a short time in his father's real estate business, and after a brief flirtation with the clarinet he was inspired by a Duke Ellington recording featuring bassist Jimmy Blanton. Encouraged by his mother he studied with Carl Torello, double bassist for the Philadelphia Orchestra, and at the Ornstein School of Music in Philadelphia.

== Career highlights ==
Merritt worked in jazz, R&B, and blues. In the early 1950s he toured with rock and roll musicians Bull Moose Jackson and Chris Powell moving on to work with bluesman BB King from 1955 to 1957.

In 1957, Merritt moved to Manhattan, New York, to work with Art Blakey and the Jazz Messengers. The Messenger ensemble Merritt joined featured his friend Benny Golson as well as Bobby Timmons and Lee Morgan. Merritt's touring and recording with Blakey extended until 1962, when an unknown ailment forced him to stop touring.

By 1964, Merritt was back, working with the trumpeter and vocalist Chet Baker, and is featured prominently in Baker's unfinished autobiography published under the title As Though I Had Wings: The Lost Memoir.

From 1965 to 1968, Merritt worked with the drummer, composer and activist Max Roach, not only in the rhythm section but as a composer, recording "Nommo" on Roach's Atlantic album Drums Unlimited (1966). "Nommo" would earn Merritt a nomination for Best Jazz Composer in DownBeat magazine's Critics Poll.

Merritt left Max Roach in the late 1960s to work with trumpeter Dizzy Gillespie, appearing with Gillespie's band on The Dick Cavett Show.

One of Jymie Merritt's most productive showcases as a composer was when he reunited with his former Jazz Messenger Lee Morgan. Morgan's Blue Note album Live at the Lighthouse (1970) featuring Merritt's composition "Absolutions" (recorded earlier by Max Roach).

In 1962, Jymie Merritt formed and fronted the Forerunners in Philadelphia, Pennsylvania. The band, which evolved into a music cooperative exploring Merritt's own system of chord inversions, harmonics, and unique approaches to composition and rehearsals, produced a lexicon of its own known as the "Forerunner system" or concept. The Forerunner concept in its early days culminated in Merritt's expansive composition "Visions of the Ghost Dance".

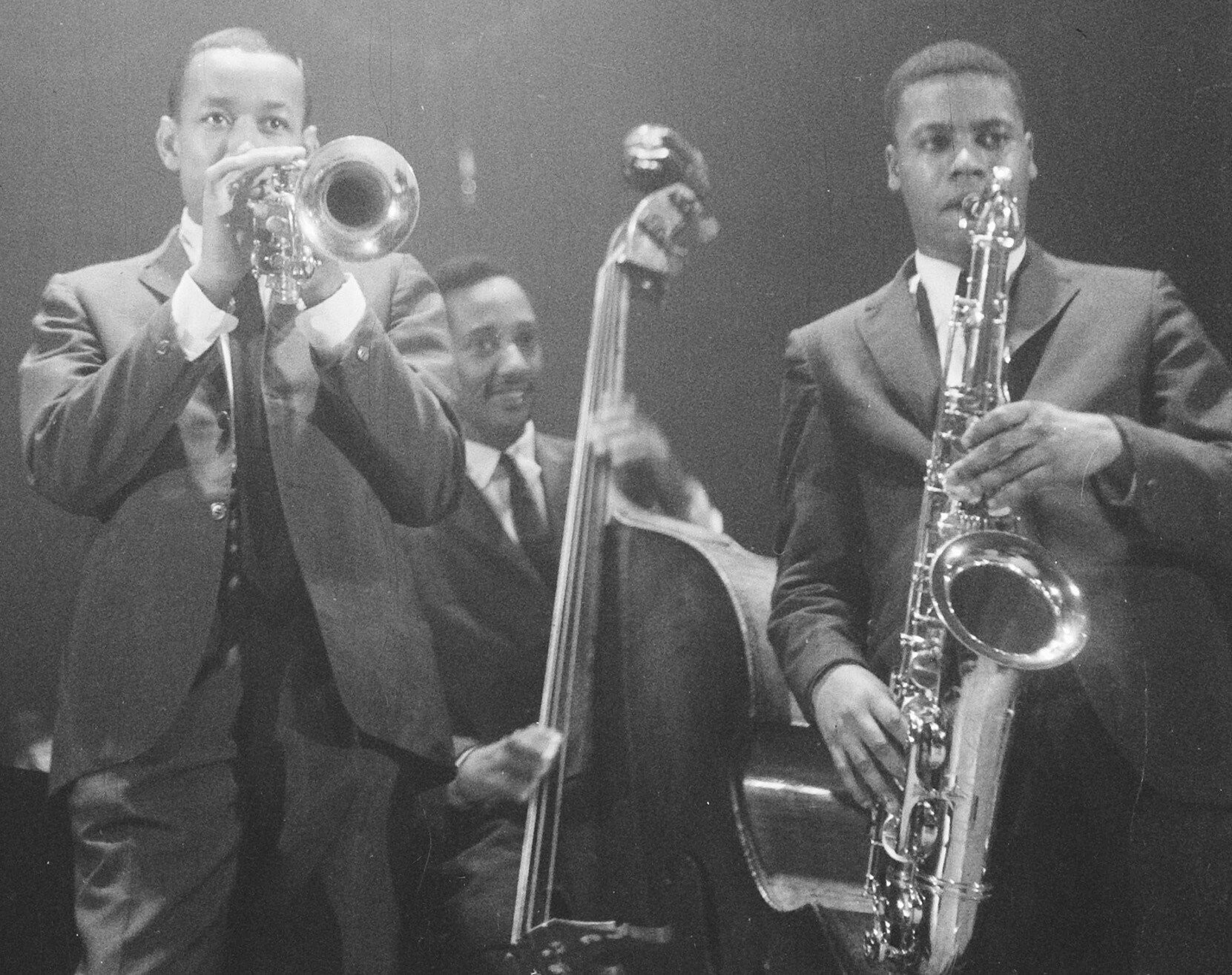
Jymie Merritt with Lee Morgan (left) and Wayne Shorter (right) in The Jazz Messengers

Among the original members of the Forerunner band were Odean Pope, Kenny Lowe, Donald Bailey, and September Wrice. This group performed regularly in and around Philadelphia for five years, until Merritt joined Max Roach's band. Pope also joined Roach's band, playing with him into the 1970s. Forerunner was on and off periodically from the 1960s through the 1980s, depending on what band Merritt was playing with at the time as well as how his health was. Saxophonist Bobby Zankel was a member of the second incarnation of the band when he joined in 1982, which also included Alan Nelson, Odean Pope, Julian Pressley, Colmore Duncan, and Warren McLendon. Zankel is primarily known as an alto saxophonist, but played baritone sax with the band, and described the role of the sax section over solos as taking on an accompanying role, where they would always play under the soloist, comparing it to the typical role of the bassist but in the sax section." Approaching his 90th birthday Merritt continued to rehearse and perform with the current incarnation of the Forerunners, some of whom had been with the ensemble from its inception.

== Pioneer of the electric bass ==
Merritt joined the Bull Moose Jackson band in 1949, and was an early adopter of the Ampeg Baby bass (a hybrid acoustic-electric instrument). Merritt recalls when he first bought a Fender bass guitar:

"Now all this time, I had been playing electric bass, from about the first year of service with the Bull Moose band. We were out in Oklahoma somewhere, when Benny Golson saw this Western band, what you call a hillbilly band, with a fellow playing what looked like a guitar and sounded like a bass. Benny got me over to hear this and we later saw one in a music store. Benny went in for some reeds or something, so I tried a Fender electric bass and that night I took it to work. The owner let me take it and I tried it out working and nobody raised any objection. I had been having trouble with my own bass, one of the assembly line types, so I was in the market for a new bass. Anyway, I got curious and bought the thing and played it for the next seven years or so. I guess at the time I was the only one in jazz playing an electric bass. Certainly, I’m pretty sure Monk Montgomery wasn’t playing one because we used to see him in Minneapolis and he was always interested to see the instrument."

== Awards and honors ==
In November 2013, along with friend and fellow bassist Reggie Workman, Jymie Merritt received the Clef Club of Philadelphia's Living Legend, Jazz Award.

At the 2009 Philadelphia Jazz Fair, produced by musician and professor Don Glanden, Philadelphia's University of the Arts and the Jazz Heritage Project honored Jymie Merritt and the jazz organist Trudy Pitts with the Jazz Heritage Award. Merritt's award was presented to him by another great Philadelphia bassist, the late Charles Fambrough.

In addition, Jymie Merritt was honored with the Don Redman Heritage Award in June 2008 at a ceremony and concert in Harper's Ferry, West Virginia at the annual event sponsored by the Harpers Ferry Historical Association and the Jefferson County NAACP in cooperation with the Don Redman Heritage Society of Piedmont, West Virginia.

== Personal life ==
Merritt's marriage to Dorothy Viola Small (d. 2008) produced five children: Mharlyn Merritt, a writer and vocalist who received a National Endowment for the Arts Fellowship for Jazz Performance in 1988; Marlon Merritt, an accomplished guitarist and retired career Army veteran of the Iraqi War; Martyn Merritt (deceased), world traveler, bon vivant and classical pianist who studied with internationally acclaimed pianist Leon Bates; Marvon Merritt, percussionist and drummer, and Mike Merritt, a renowned bassist in his own right who has performed and recorded with Levon Helm, Phoebe Snow, Johnny Copeland, B. B. King and many other world-class musicians. Mike is best known as the bassist for the Basic Cable Band on Conan O'Brien's TBS talk-show. Continuing the family's musical heritage in 2005 Mike co-produced along with his sister Mharlyn an independent CD on the EMerrittus label featuring brother Marlon on guitar, Uri Caine, Al Kooper, Lew Soloff and the Vivino Brothers entitled "Alone Together".

Merritt had a younger brother, LeRoy Merritt, an amateur artist and arts and crafts enthusiast who lived in West Philadelphia, Pennsylvania.

Merritt lived in Center City, Philadelphia, with his wife Ave and his cat Jazzie. He died on April 10, 2020, of liver cancer in Philadelphia, aged 93.

== Discography ==
=== As sideman ===
With Art Blakey and the Jazz Messengers

- Moanin' (Blue Note, 1958)
- 1958 – Paris Olympia (Fontana, 1958)
- Des Femmes Disparaissent (Fontana, 1958 [1959])
- At the Jazz Corner of the World (Blue Note, 1959)
- Just Coolin' (Blue Note, 1959 [2020])
- Les Liaisons Dangereuses (Fontana, 1959) – with Barney Wilen
- Africaine (Blue Note, 1959 [1981])
- Paris Jam Session (1959 [1961])
- The Big Beat (Blue Note, 1960)
- Like Someone in Love (Blue Note, 1960 [1967])
- Meet You at the Jazz Corner of the World, Vol. 1 (Blue Note, 1960 [1961])
- Meet You at the Jazz Corner of the World, Vol. 2 (Blue Note, 1960 [1962])
- A Night in Tunisia (Blue Note, 1960 [1961])
- Art Blakey and the Jazz Messengers (Impulse, 1961)
- Mosaic (Blue Note, 1961 [1962])
- A Day with Art Blakey and the Jazz Messengers (Baybridge, 1961 [1981])
- The Freedom Rider (Blue Note, 1961 [1964])
- Roots & Herbs (Blue Note, 1961 [1970])
- Pisces (Blue Note, 1961; 1964 [1971])
- Three Blind Mice (United Artists, 1961; 1962 [1962])
- Buhaina's Delight (Blue Note, 1961 [1963])
- The Witch Doctor (Blue Note, 1961 [1967])

With Chet Baker

- The Most Important Jazz Album of 1964/65 (Colpix, 1964)

With Sonny Clark

- The Art of The Trio (Blue Note, 1958 [1980])
- Blues in the Night (Blue Note, 1958 [1979])
- Standards (Blue Note, 1958 [1998])

With Curtis Fuller

- South American Cookin' (Epic, 1961) – with Zoot Sims
- Soul Trombone (Impulse, 1961)

With Benny Golson

- The Other Side of Benny Golson (Riverside, 1958)

With Lee Morgan

- Live at the Lighthouse (Blue Note, 1970 [1971])
- The Last Session (Blue Note, 1971 [1972])

With Max Roach

- Drums Unlimited (Atlantic, 1965; 1966 [1966])
- Members, Don't Git Weary (Atlantic, 1968)

With Wayne Shorter

- Wayning Moments (Vee-Jay, 1961 [1962])

With Jimmy Witherspoon

- The Blues Is Now (Verve, 1967)
