= Wayning Moments =

Studio album by Wayne Shorter
- Released: 1962
- Recorded: November 2 & 6, 1961
- Studio: Universal Recorders, Chicago
- Genre: Bop, hard bop, post-bop
- Length: 32:19 original LP; 67:27 CD reissue
- Label: Vee-Jay; VJLP 3029
- Producer: Sid McCoy

Wayne Shorter chronology
Introducing Wayne Shorter (1960)	Wayning Moments (1962)	Night Dreamer (1964)

Professional ratings
Review scores
Source	Rating
AllMusic	4/5 stars
The Penguin Guide to Jazz Recordings	3/4 stars

Wayning Moments is the third album by saxophonist Wayne Shorter (and his final album for Vee-Jay Records), showcasing Wayne playing hard bop with trumpeter Freddie Hubbard, pianist Eddie Higgins, bassist Jymie Merritt and drummer Marshall Thompson. CD reissues added alternate takes of all eight tracks.

== Track listing ==
All compositions by Wayne Shorter except where noted.

1. "Black Orpheus" [Take 4] (Luiz Bonfá, Antônio Maria) – 4:35
2. "Devil's Island" [Take 8] – 3:56
3. "Moon of Manakoora" [Take 2] (Frank Loesser, Alfred Newman) – 3:45
4. "Dead End" [Take 8] – 4:35
5. "Wayning Moments" [Take 2] (Eddie Higgins) – 4:22
6. "Powder Keg" [Take 5] – 3:14
7. "All or Nothing at All" [Take 3] (Arthur Altman, Jack Lawrence) – 2:58
8. "Callaway Went That-A-Way" [Take 3] – 4:54

Bonus tracks on CD

9. "Black Orpheus" [Take 3] – 4:43
10. "Devil's Island" [Take 7] – 4:00
11. "Moon of Manakoora" [Take 1] – 4:50
12. "Dead End" [Take 7] – 4:40
13. "Wayning Moments" [Take 3] – 6:19
14. "Powder Keg" [Take 1] – 3:38
15. "All or Nothing at All" [Take 2] – 2:59
16. "Callaway Went That-A-Way" [Take 1] – 3:59

Note

- Recorded on November 2 (1, 4, 7–9, 12, 15–16) and 6th (2–3, 5–6, 10–11, 13–14), 1961.

== Personnel ==
- Wayne Shorter – tenor saxophone
- Freddie Hubbard – trumpet
- Eddie Higgins – piano
- Jymie Merritt – double-bass
- Marshall Thompson – drums
