= Lift Every Voice and Sing (album) =

Studio album by Max Roach with the J.C. White Singers
- Released: 1971
- Recorded: April 7 –8, 1971; New York City
- Genre: Jazz
- Length: 36:58
- Labels: Atlantic; SD 1587
- Producer: Joel Dorn

Max Roach chronology
Members, Don't Git Weary (1968)	Lift Every Voice and Sing (1971)	Re: Percussion (1973)

Lift Every Voice and Sing is an album by American jazz drummer Max Roach with the J.C. White Singers recorded in 1971 and released on the Atlantic label.

== Reception ==
Professional ratings
Review scores
Source	Rating
Allmusic	4/5 stars
The Penguin Guide to Jazz Recordings	3/4 stars

Allmusic awarded the album 4 stars and its review by Vincent Thomas states, "Few albums exhibit the church's lasting effect on his musical direction more than Lift Every Voice and Sing. It's deeper than the album title... it's the Elvin Jones/John Coltrane-esque interplay between Roach and Harper on "Joshua" that makes this album unforgettable—every time the choir comes in, the emotion is enough to crumble the Wall of Jericho".

== Track listing ==
1. "Motherless Child" (Traditional) – 7:21
2. "Garden of Prayer" (Patricia Curtis, Max Roach) – 2:47
3. "Troubled Waters" (Traditional) – 7:00
4. "Let Thy People Go" (Traditional) – 6:50
5. "Were You There When They Crucified My Lord" (Traditional) – 5:48
6. "Joshua" (Traditional) – 7:12
- Recorded in New York on April 7, 1971 (tracks 1 & 3–5), and April 8, 1971 (tracks 2 & 6)

== Personnel ==
- Max Roach – drums, arranger
- Cecil Bridgewater – trumpet
- Billy Harper – tenor saxophone
- George Cables – piano
- Eddie Mathias – electric bass
- Ralph MacDonald – percussion
- Ruby McClure, Dorothy White, J.C. White – vocals
- Unidentified 22 voice choir
- William Bell, Abbey Lincoln, Coleridge-Taylor Perkinson – arranger
