= Three Blind Mice (album) =

Live album by Art Blakey and the Jazz Messengers
- Released: August 1962 (UA release)
- Recorded: 1961–2
- Genre: Jazz
- Label: United Artists Records
- Producer: Alan Douglas

Art Blakey chronology
The African Beat (1962)	Three Blind Mice (1962)	Caravan (1962)

The Jazz Messengers chronology
Buhaina's Delight (1962)	Three Blind Mice (1962)	Caravan (1962)

Professional ratings
Review scores
Source	Rating
Down Beat	4/5 stars
Allmusic	3/5 stars

Three Blind Mice is a 1962 jazz album released by Art Blakey and The Jazz Messengers on the United Artists Jazz label, featuring live material recorded in 1962 Club Renaissance, Hollywood. In 1990, it was reissued in two volumes by Blue Note Records, adding two tracks recorded in 1961 at The Village Gate and also unreleased material from the primary session. It was bassist Jymie Merritt's final recording with the group before having to leave to recover from an illness; he would be replaced by Reggie Workman.

United Artists and Blue Note re-issued a two-volume CD set, Three Blind Mice Vols. 1 & 2, with all available live tracks from the original date of recording and an alternate take.

== Track listing ==
Three Blind Mice

1. "Three Blind Mice" (Fuller) - 8:20
2. "Blue Moon" (Richard Rodgers, Lorenz Hart) - 6:01
3. "That Old Feeling" (Lew Brown, Sammy Fain) - 6:36
4. "Plexus" (Walton) - 5:51
5. "Up Jumped Spring" (Hubbard) - 9:48
6. "When Lights Are Low" (Benny Carter, Spencer Williams) - 4:11

Three Blind Mice, Vol. 1

1. "Three Blind Mice" (Fuller) - 8:20
2. "Blue Moon" (Richard Rodgers, Lorenz Hart) - 6:01
3. "That Old Feeling" (Lew Brown, Sammy Fain) - 6:36
4. "Plexus" (Walton) - 5:51
5. "Up Jumped Spring" (Hubbard) - 9:48
6. "Up Jumped Spring [alternate take]" (Hubbard) - 5:18
7. "When Lights Are Low" (Benny Carter, Spencer Williams) - 4:11
8. "Children of the Night" (Shorter) - 8:13

Three Blind Mice, Vol. 2

1. "It's Only a Paper Moon" (Harold Arlen, E.Y. "Yip" Harburg, Billy Rose) - 13:27
2. "Mosaic" (Walton) - 12:30
3. "Ping Pong" (Shorter) - 12:24
4. "The Promised Land" (Walton) - 13:13
5. "Arabia" (Fuller) - 11:25

"The Promised Land" and "Arabia" recorded August 17, 1961 at the Village Gate, NYC by Rudy Van Gelder

All others recorded March 18, 1962 at Club Renaissance, Hollywood, CA by Wally Heider

== Personnel ==
- Art Blakey - drums
- Freddie Hubbard - trumpet
- Curtis Fuller - trombone
- Wayne Shorter - tenor saxophone
- Cedar Walton - piano
- Jymie Merritt - bass
