= Like Someone in Love (Art Blakey album) =

Studio album by Art Blakey and the Jazz Messengers
- Released: Mid-August 1967
- Recorded: August 7 & 14, 1960
- Studio: Van Gelder Studio, Englewood Cliffs, NJ
- Genre: Jazz
- Length: 39:56 original LP
- Label: Blue Note; BST 84245
- Producer: Alfred Lion

Art Blakey and the Jazz Messengers chronology
Soul Finger (1965)	Like Someone in Love (1967)	The Witch Doctor (1969)

Professional ratings
Review scores
Source	Rating
Allmusic	3/5 stars
DownBeat	3.5/5 stars
The Rolling Stone Jazz Record Guide	4/5 stars
The Penguin Guide to Jazz Recordings	3.5/4 stars

Like Someone in Love is an album by Art Blakey and The Jazz Messengers. It was recorded in August 1960, at the same sessions which produced A Night in Tunisia, but was released on Blue Note only in August 1967. It features performances by Blakey with Lee Morgan, Wayne Shorter, Bobby Timmons, and Jymie Merritt.

== Track listing ==
1. "Like Someone in Love" (Burke, Van Heusen) - 8:04
2. "Johnny's Blue" (Morgan) - 9:12
3. "Noise in the Attic" (Shorter) - 7:54
4. "Sleeping Dancer Sleep On" (Shorter) - 8:06
5. "Giantis" (Shorter) - 5:35
6. "Sleeping Dancer Sleep On" [Alternate Take] - 8:05 Bonus track on CD

Recorded on August 7 (#3, 4, 6) and August 14 (#1, 2, 5), 1960.

== Personnel ==
- Art Blakey – drums
- Lee Morgan – trumpet, flugelhorn
- Wayne Shorter – tenor saxophone
- Bobby Timmons – piano
- Jymie Merritt – bass
