= Mosaic (Art Blakey album) =

Studio album by Art Blakey & the Jazz Messengers
- Released: January 1962
- Recorded: October 2, 1961
- Studios: Van Gelder Studio; Englewood Cliffs, New Jersey
- Genre: Hard bop
- Length: 40:16
- Labels: Blue Note; BLP 4090
- Producer: Alfred Lion

Art Blakey & the Jazz Messengers chronology
Meet You at the Jazz Corner of the World (1961)	Mosaic (1962)	Buhaina's Delight (1963)

Professional ratings
Review scores
Source	Rating
AllMusic	4/5 stars
The Rolling Stone Jazz Record Guide	4/5 stars
The Penguin Guide to Jazz Recordings	4/4 stars

Mosaic is a studio album by Art Blakey & the Jazz Messengers recorded for Blue Note on October 2, 1961, and released the following year. The sextet features horn section Wayne Shorter, Freddie Hubbard and Curtis Fuller and rhythm section Cedar Walton, Jymie Merritt and Art Blakey.

== Background ==
The lineup recorded and performed together from 1961 into 1964. Hubbard and Walton became permanent members of the group following the 1961 departures of trumpeter Lee Morgan and pianist Bobby Timmons.

== Track listing ==
=== Side 1 ===
1. "Mosaic" (Walton) – 8:13
2. "Down Under" (Hubbard) – 5:29
3. "Children of the Night" (Shorter) – 8:51

=== Side 2 ===
1. "Arabia" (Fuller) – 9:10
2. "Crisis" (Hubbard) – 8:33

== Personnel ==
=== The Jazz Messengers ===
- Freddie Hubbard – trumpet
- Curtis Fuller – trombone
- Wayne Shorter – tenor saxophone
- Cedar Walton – piano
- Jymie Merritt – bass
- Art Blakey – drums

=== Technical personnel ===
- Alfred Lion – producer
- Rudy Van Gelder – recording engineer, mastering
- Reid Miles – design
- Francis Wolff – photography
- Leonard Feather – liner notes

== Charts ==
Chart performance for Mosaic
Chart (2023)	Peak position
US Top Jazz Albums (Billboard)	21
