= Caravan (Art Blakey album) =

Studio album by Art Blakey and the Jazz Messengers
- Released: Early February 1963
- Recorded: October 23–24, 1962; Plaza Sound Studios, New York City
- Genre: Jazz, hard bop
- Length: 52:17
- Label: Riverside; RLP 438
- Producer: Orrin Keepnews

Art Blakey and the Jazz Messengers chronology
Three Blind Mice (1962)	Caravan (1963)	Ugetsu (1963)

Caravan is a jazz album released by Art Blakey and the Jazz Messengers in February 1963. It was Blakey's first album for Riverside Records after he signed with them in October 1962. The songs were recorded at the Plaza Sound Studio in New York City, on October 23–24, 1962 The producer was Orrin Keepnews who also supervised the album's remastered re-release on CD.

== Critical reception ==
Professional ratings
Review scores
Source	Rating
Down Beat (Original Lp release)	4/5 stars
Allmusic	4.5/5 stars
The Rolling Stone Jazz Record Guide	4/5 stars
The Penguin Guide to Jazz Recordings	3/4 stars

In 2007, the BBC described Caravan as "a slick, fluid, professional set of hard bop at its finest". Michael G. Nastos identified the album as Blakey's "best work" in the All Music Guide to Jazz, which marked the recording as part of an essential collection. The Penguin Guide to Jazz awarded the album three stars (of a possible four), describing it as a "solid but unimposing set."

== Track listing ==
1. "Caravan" (Juan Tizol) – 9:47
2. "Sweet 'n' Sour" (Shorter) – 5:31
3. "In the Wee Small Hours of the Morning" (Mann, Hilliard) – 4:06
4. "This Is for Albert" (Shorter) – 8:21
5. "Skylark" (Carmichael, Mercer) – 4:51
6. "Thermo" (Hubbard) – 6:48
- The remastered CD re-issue features two alternate takes, each preceding its master take.
7. "Thermo (Take 2)" (Hubbard) – 7:26
8. "Sweet 'n' Sour (Take 4)" (Shorter) – 5:27

== Personnel ==
- Art Blakey – drums
- Freddie Hubbard – trumpet
- Curtis Fuller – trombone
- Wayne Shorter – tenor saxophone
- Cedar Walton – piano
- Reggie Workman – bass
