= Pisces (Art Blakey album) =

1979 jazz album by Art Blakey and the Jazz Messengers

Compilation album by Art Blakey & the Jazz Messengers
- Released: 1979
- Recorded: February 12, 1961; May 27, 1961; April 15, 1964
- Studio: Van Gelder Studio; Englewood Cliffs, New Jersey
- Genre: Jazz
- Length: 38:11
- Label: Blue Note; GXF 3060
- Producer: Alfred Lion

Art Blakey & the Jazz Messengers chronology
Meet You at the Jazz Corner of the World, Vol. 2 (1960)	Pisces (1979)	The Freedom Rider (1961)

Pisces is a jazz album by Art Blakey & the Jazz Messengers. It was recorded between 1961 and 1964, but not issued on Blue Note Records until 1979. More a compilation than an album, all the tracks, except for "It's A Long Way Down", may be found on the Mosaic compilation The Complete Blue Note Recordings of Art Blakey's 1960 Jazz Messengers. Moreover, "Uptight", and "Pisces" are included on the CD reissue of The Freedom Rider, whilst "It's a Long Way Down" is featured on the CD reissue of Indestructible. Ultimately, "United" and "Ping Pong" may be found on Roots & Herbs.

== Reception ==
Professional ratings
Review scores
Source	Rating
AllMusic	2.5/5 stars

AllMusic awarded the album two-and-a-half stars.

== Track listing ==
=== Original LP ===
Side 1
No.	Title	Writer(s)	Date recorded	Length
1.	"United"	Shorter	February 12, 1961	6:49
2.	"Ping Pong"	Wayne Shorter	February 12, 1961	6:03
3.	"Pisces"	Morgan	February 12, 1961	6:54

Side 2
No.	Title	Writer(s)	Date recorded	Length
1.	"Uptight"	Lee Morgan	May 27, 1961	6:16
2.	"Blue Ching"	Kenny Dorham	February 12, 1961	6:47
3.	"It's a Long Way Down"	Wayne Shorter	April 15, 1964	5:26

=== 2013 CD reissue ===
The Solar Records (EU) reissue also features some tracks from the same sessions, already available on The Freedom Rider and Roots & Herbs.

No.	Title	Writer(s)	Date recorded	Length
1.	"United"	Wayne Shorter	February 12, 1961	6:49
2.	"Ping Pong"	Wayne Shorter	February 12, 1961	5:59
3.	"Pisces"	Lee Morgan	February 12, 1961	6:54
4.	"Uptight"	Lee Morgan	May 27, 1961	6:16
5.	"Blue Ching"	Kenny Dorham	February 12, 1961	6:47
6.	"It's a Long Way Down"	Wayne Shorter	April 15, 1964	5:26
7.	"Ping Pong" (alternate take)		February 12, 1961	7:10
8.	"United" (alternate take)		February 12, 1961	7:25
9.	"Roots and Herbs"		February 18, 1961	6:06
10.	"Look at the Birdie"		February 18, 1961	6:43
11.	"Master Mind"		February 18, 1961	6:53
12.	"Petty Larceny"		February 18, 1961	6:15

== Personnel ==
=== The Jazz Messengers ===
==== February 12 & & May 27, 1961 ====
- Lee Morgan – trumpet
- Wayne Shorter – tenor saxophone
- Bobby Timmons – piano
- Jymie Merritt – bass
- Art Blakey – drums

==== April 15, 1964 ====
- Lee Morgan – trumpet
- Curtis Fuller – trombone
- Wayne Shorter – tenor saxophone
- Cedar Walton – piano
- Reggie Workman – bass
- Art Blakey – drums
