= Sonic Boom (Lee Morgan album) =

Studio album by Lee Morgan
- Released: 1979
- Recorded: April 14 & 28, 1967
- Studio: Van Gelder Studio, Englewood Cliffs, NJ
- Genre: Jazz, hard bop
- Length: 37:25 original LP; 74:19 CD reissue
- Label: Blue Note; LT 987
- Producer: Alfred Lion (#1–6); Francis Wolff (#7–13)

Lee Morgan chronology
Standards (1967)	Sonic Boom (1979)	The Procrastinator (1969)

Alternative cover
- Japanese edition

Alternative cover
- 2003 CD reissue

Sonic Boom is an album by jazz trumpeter Lee Morgan, recorded on April 14 and 28, 1967, but not released on the Blue Note label until 1979.

The 2003 CD reissue added seven tracks recorded on September 12 & October 10, 1969, which were first released on the original double LP edition of The Procrastinator. Therefore, the CD edition includes performances by Morgan with two line-ups: the first one with tenor saxophonist David "Fathead" Newman, pianist Cedar Walton, bassist Ron Carter, and drummer Billy Higgins, whilst the second features trombonist Julian Priester, tenor saxophonist George Coleman, pianist Harold Mabern, bassist Walter Booker, and drummer Mickey Roker. The Sonic Boom session is notable for the rare contribution of David "Fathead" Newman, who made only two Blue Note appearances during his career, the other being with Lonnie Smith.

== Reception ==
Professional ratings
Review scores
Source	Rating
AllMusic	4/5 stars
The Guardian	3/5 stars
The Penguin Guide to Jazz	3/4 stars
The Rolling Stone Jazz Record Guide	3/5 stars

Wrtiting for AllAboutJazz, Germein Linares described Sonic Boom as "an underrated gem" and "vintage Morgan", highlighting the "remarkable" pairing of Morgan and Newman in the session's frontline. In a more muted review for The Guardian, jazz critic John Fordham described Morgan's improvisations as "models of shrewdly paced virtuosity" and noted Newman's propensity for 'imaginative' playing, something often obscured in his other more commercial sessions. Newman's importance to the session was also identified by Scott Yanow for AllMusic, who concluded that Sonic Boom was an "undeservedly obscure session".

== Track listing ==
All compositions by Lee Morgan except where noted

1. "Sneaky Pete" - 5:45
2. "The Mercenary" - 7:10
3. "Sonic Boom" - 6:18
4. "Fathead" - 5:27
5. "I'll Never Be the Same" (Malneck, Signorelli, Kahn) - 7:16
6. "Mumbo Jumbo" - 5:29

2003 bonus tracks on CD reissue, originally part of The Procrastinator:

7. "Free Flow" (Coleman) - 4:50
8. "Stormy Weather" (Arlen, Koehler) - 5:44
9. "Mr. Johnson" (Mabern) - 6:11
10. "The Stroker" (Priester) - 5:47
11. "Uncle Rough" (Mabern) - 5:35
12. "Claw-Til-Da" (Roker) - 3:07
13. "Untitled Boogaloo" - 5:40

Recorded on April 14, 1967 (#3) and April 28, 1967 (#1–2, 4–6); September 12, 1969 (#8–9, 13) and October 10, 1969 (#7, 10–12).

== Personnel ==
Tracks 1–6

- Lee Morgan - trumpet
- David "Fathead" Newman - tenor sax
- Cedar Walton - piano
- Ron Carter - bass
- Billy Higgins - drums

Tracks 7–13

- Lee Morgan - trumpet
- Julian Priester - trombone
- George Coleman - tenor sax
- Harold Mabern - piano
- Walter Booker - bass
- Mickey Roker - drums
