= Holiday Soul (Bobby Timmons album) =

Studio album by Bobby Timmons
- Released: 1964
- Recorded: November 24, 1964
- Studio: Van Gelder Studio, Englewood Cliffs, NJ
- Genre: Jazz, Christmas
- Label: Prestige
- Producer: Ozzie Cadena

Bobby Timmons chronology
| Workin' Out! (1964) | Holiday Soul (1964) | Chicken & Dumplin's (1965) |

Holiday Soul is an album of Christmas music by the American jazz pianist Bobby Timmons, recorded in 1964 and released on the Prestige label.

== Reception ==
Professional ratings
Review scores
| Source | Rating |
|---|---|
| AllMusic | 3/5 stars |
| DownBeat | 4/5 stars |

The AllMusic review awarded the album 3 stars. DownBeat commented that Timmons played the Christmas material "without seeming the least bit self-conscious about his soul-jazz and blues tendencies". The All About Jazz reviewer also commented that the pianist retained his normal playing style despite the material. Critic Marc Myers selected it for his Vintage Holiday Album Hall of Fame in 2015.

== Track listing ==
1. "Deck the Halls" (Traditional) – 3:10
2. "White Christmas" (Irving Berlin) – 7:00
3. "The Christmas Song" (Mel Tormé, Robert Wells) – 5:15
4. "Auld Lang Syne" (Robert Burns, Traditional) – 4:35
5. "Santa Claus Is Coming to Town" (J. Fred Coots, Haven Gillespie) – 6:00
6. "Winter Wonderland" (Felix Bernard, Richard B. Smith) – 5:30
7. "We Three Kings" (John Henry Hopkins, Jr.) – 5:00
8. "You're All I Want for Christmas" (Seger Ellis, Glen Moore) – 5:00
- Recorded at Rudy Van Gelder Studio in Englewood Cliffs, New Jersey on November 24, 1964.

== Personnel ==
- Bobby Timmons - piano
- Butch Warren - double bass
- Walter Perkins - drums
