= Buhaina's Delight =

Studio album by Art Blakey and the Jazz Messengers
- Released: Early July 1963
- Recorded: November 28 & December 18, 1961
- Studios: Van Gelder Studio, Englewood Cliffs, New Jersey
- Genre: Jazz
- Length: 40:09
- Labels: Blue Note Records; BST 84104
- Producer: Alfred Lion

Art Blakey chronology
Mosaic (1961)	Buhaina's Delight (1963)	The African Beat (1962)

The Jazz Messengers chronology
Mosaic (1961)	Buhaina's Delight (1961)	Three Blind Mice (1962)

Professional ratings
Review scores
Source	Rating
Down Beat	4.5/5 stars
Allmusic	4.0/5 stars
The Rolling Stone Jazz Record Guide	4/5 stars
The Penguin Guide to Jazz Recordings	4/4 stars

Buhaina's Delight is a jazz album released by Art Blakey and the Jazz Messengers in 1963. Produced by Alfred Lion, the album was recorded in two sessions on November 28, 1961 and December 18, 1961 at Van Gelder Studio in Englewood Cliffs, New Jersey. The album was released by Blue Note Records in July 1963 after Blakey had gone to Riverside Records in late 1962.

== Background ==
"Buhaina" is a reference to the Muslim name, Abdullah ibn Buhaina, Blakey received upon conversion to Islam in 1948 while traveling in West Africa. Although he stopped practicing Islam in the 1950s, Blakey continued to use the name, which became titular on two albums.

== Track listing ==
1. "Backstage Sally" (Shorter) - 5:58
2. "Contemplation" (Shorter) - 6:18
3. "Bu's Delight" (Fuller) - 9:20
4. "Reincarnation Blues" (Shorter) - 6:36
5. "Shaky Jake" (Walton) - 6:38
6. "Moon River" (Henry Mancini, Johnny Mercer) - 5:12
7. "Backstage Sally" (alternate version) - 6:01 *
8. "Bu's Delight" (alternate version) - 6:54 *
9. "Reincarnation Blues" (alternate version) - 4:59 *
10. "Moon River" (alternate take) - 5:13 *
- * = previously unissued bonus tracks
- Recorded on November 28 (#2, 6–10) and December 18 (all others), 1961 by Rudy van Gelder at the Van Gelder Studio, Englewood Cliffs, New Jersey

== Personnel ==
- Art Blakey - drums
- Freddie Hubbard - trumpet
- Curtis Fuller - trombone
- Wayne Shorter - tenor saxophone
- Cedar Walton - piano
- Jymie Merritt - bass

== Charts ==
Chart performance for Buhaina's Delight
Chart (2020)	Peak position
US Top Jazz Albums (Billboard)	24
