= The Soul Man! =

Studio album by Bobby Timmons
- Released: 1966
- Recorded: January 20, 1966
- Studio: Van Gelder Studio, Englewood Cliffs, New Jersey
- Genre: Jazz
- Length: 40:32
- Label: Prestige
- Producer: Cal Lampley

Bobby Timmons chronology
Chicken & Dumplin's (1965)	The Soul Man! (1966)	Soul Food (1966)

The Soul Man! is an album by American jazz pianist Bobby Timmons recorded in 1966 and released on the Prestige Records.

== Reception ==
The Allmusic review by Ron Wynn awarded the album 3 stars stating: "Plenty of funk, blues, and soul-jazz, plus great piano."

Professional ratings
Review scores
Source	Rating
AllMusic	3/5 stars
The Rolling Stone Jazz Record Guide	3/5 stars

== Track listing ==
All compositions by Bobby Timmons except as noted

1. "Cut Me Loose Charlie" - 5:40
2. "Tom Thumb" (Wayne Shorter) - 7:00
3. "Ein Bahn Strasse (One Way Street)" (Ron Carter) - 7:15
4. "Damned If I Know" - 6:20
5. "Tenaj" (Carter) - 7:00
6. "Little Waltz" (Carter) - 7:09

== Personnel ==
- Bobby Timmons - piano
- Wayne Shorter - tenor saxophone
- Ron Carter - bass
- Jimmy Cobb - drums
