= Golden Boy (Art Blakey album) =

Studio album by Art Blakey and the Jazz Messengers
- Released: November 1964
- Recorded: 1963; New York City
- Genre: Jazz
- Label: Colpix; CP 478
- Producer: Jack Lewis

Art Blakey and the Jazz Messengers chronology
Indestructible (1964)	Golden Boy (1964)	'S Make It (1965)

Golden Boy (full title Art Blakey & The Jazz Messengers Play Selections From the New Musical Golden Boy) is a 1963 album by Art Blakey and the Jazz Messengers, performing compositions by Lee Adams and Charles Strouse written for the Broadway musical Golden Boy. The LP was originally released on the Colpix label.

== Reception ==
Professional ratings
Review scores
Source	Rating
Allmusic	3.5/5 stars

Allmusic awarded the album three and a half stars.

== Track listing ==
All compositions by Lee Adams and Charles Strouse

1. "Theme from Golden Boy" - 5:35
2. "Yes I Can" - 5:25
3. "Lorna's Here" - 5:09
4. "This Is the Life" - 5:56
5. "There's a Party" - 5:00
6. "I Want to Be with You" - 4:03

== Personnel ==
- Art Blakey - drums
- Freddie Hubbard, Lee Morgan - trumpet
- Curtis Fuller - trombone, arranger
- Julius Watkins - French horn
- Bill Barber - tuba
- James Spaulding - alto saxophone
- Wayne Shorter - tenor saxophone, arranger
- Charles Davis - baritone saxophone
- Cedar Walton - piano, arranger
- Reggie Workman - bass
