= The Young Lions (album) =

Studio album by The Young Lions
- Released: Last two weeks of August 1961
- Recorded: April 25, 1960
- Studio: Bell Sound (New York City)
- Genre: Jazz
- Length: 35:14 original LP
- Label: Vee-Jay; VJLP 3013
- Producer: Sid McCoy

Professional ratings
Review scores
Source	Rating
AllMusic	5/5 stars

The Young Lions is an album by an ad hoc group of jazz musicians: Wayne Shorter, Frank Strozier, Lee Morgan, Bobby Timmons, Bob Cranshaw, Albert Heath and Louis Hayes. It was recorded at Bell Sound Studios in New York City in 1960 and released in 1961 on Vee-Jay Records.

== Album title ==
The album title echoes that of a popular 1948 novel by Irwin Shaw which had been made into a feature film shortly before the album was recorded. In the album's liner notes, saxophonist Cannonball Adderley uses Shaw's novel to make an argument about jazz. Adderley writes that there is a tension in modern jazz between tradition (as represented by Charlie Parker, Dizzy Gillespie, and Thelonious Monk) and the avant-garde (which at the time included Ornette Coleman, Cecil Taylor and Jimmy Giuffre), and suggests that conformity to either traditionalism or the avant-garde is stifling of "true genius":

We are living the era of the glorification of mediocrity. These are the times when teenagers may become wealthy by writing and performing mediocre songs. When a scarcely-literate hillbilly with dubious talent may become a star with a million dollar income, or when an "All American Boy" type can spin records to which teenagers dance and become a major television personality. Many of us believe that such situations exist because we have allowed ourselves to conform to mass thinking and direction. The great novel by Irwin Shaw, The Young Lions, delivers several messages; among them, the parallel of conformity emanating from separate sources. One young man is a zealot in a community of conformist patriots who blindly follow a man bent on righting a situation that is wrong only in his ego-maniacal mind. The other young man is an unenthusiastic patriot in military service, who adheres to the "Great American Ideal," which is itself conformity. Modern jazz today is standing on the threshold of destruction by those who would do it good. The lines are drawn and clearly marked. The traditionalists are those who unofficially feel that music introduced to us by Parker, Gillespie, and Monk has not been fully developed. The avant-garde feel that music is reactionary unless something "different" is either suggested or produced stylistically. Fortunately jazz making is highly personalized and true genius will not conform to direction. "The Young Lions" who made the music on this album have varied musical philosophies and sundry jazz backgrounds.

The "young lions" phrase was revived in jazz in the 1980s when, as in 1960, there was a tension between the modern jazz traditionalists and the avant-garde. A group of young musicians including Wynton Marsalis who played neo-bop jazz were frequently referred to in the jazz press as "young lions". Notably, the phrase was used as part of the title of an Elektra/Musician album which featured Marsalis, The Young Lions (A Concert Of New Music Played By Seventeen Exceptional Young Musicians).

== Track listing ==
1. "Seeds of Sin" (Shorter) – 5:44
2. "Scourn'" (Shorter) – 5:58
3. "Fat Lady" (Timmons) – 5:03
4. "Peaches and Cream" (Shorter) – 6:52
5. "That's Right" (Morgan) – 11:37

Bonus tracks on CD reissue:

6. "Seeds of Sin" [Alternate take] – 5:43
7. "Scourn'" [Alternate take] – 6:17
8. "Fat Lady" [Alternate take] – 5:23

== Personnel ==
- Lee Morgan – trumpet
- Wayne Shorter – tenor sax
- Frank Strozier – alto sax
- Bobby Timmons – piano
- Bob Cranshaw – bass
- Louis Hayes (1, 2, 6, 7), Albert "Tootie" Heath (3–5, 8) – drums
