= Roots & Herbs =

Studio album by Art Blakey & the Jazz Messengers
- Released: October 1970
- Recorded: February 12, 1961 (#8–9); February 18, 1961 (#1, 2, 4–6); May 27, 1961 (#3, 7)
- Studio: Van Gelder Studio; Englewood Cliffs, New Jersey
- Genre: Jazz
- Length: 42:11 (LP); 61:52 (CD)
- Label: Blue Note; BST 84347
- Producer: Alfred Lion

Art Blakey & the Jazz Messengers chronology
| The Witch Doctor (1969) | Roots & Herbs (1970) | Child's Dance (1972) |

Professional ratings
Review scores
| Source | Rating |
|---|---|
| AllMusic | 4/5 stars |
| DownBeat | 3/5 stars |
| The Rolling Stone Jazz Record Guide | 4/5 stars |
| The Penguin Guide to Jazz Recordings | 4/4 stars |

Roots & Herbs is a jazz album by Art Blakey & the Jazz Messengers, recorded in 1961 at the same sessions which produced The Freedom Rider, but not released on the Blue Note label until 1970. The CD reissue features three alternate takes, two of which originally released in 1979 on Pisces.

== Track listing ==
All compositions by Wayne Shorter.

1. "Ping Pong" – 7:06
2. "Roots and Herbs" – 6:05
3. "The Back Sliders" – 7:51
4. "United" – 7:29
5. "Look at the Birdie" – 6:45
6. "Master Mind" – 6:55

Bonus tracks on CD reissue:

7. "The Back Sliders" (Alternate Take) – 6:57
8. "Ping Pong" (Alternate Version) – 5:58
9. "United" (Alternate Version) – 6:48

== Personnel ==
=== The Jazz Messengers ===
- Lee Morgan – trumpet
- Wayne Shorter – tenor saxophone
- Bobby Timmons (#1, 3, 5–9), Walter Davis, Jr. (#2, 4) – piano
- Jymie Merritt – bass
- Art Blakey – drums
