= The Procrastinator =

Studio album by Lee Morgan
- Released: 1978
- Recorded: July 14, 1967; September 12, 1969; October 10, 1969
- Studio: Van Gelder Studio, Englewood Cliffs, NJ
- Genre: Jazz
- Length: 77:21 original LP; 40:03 CD reissue
- Label: Blue Note; BN-LA582-J2
- Producer: Alfred Lion (#1–6); Francis Wolff (#7–13)

Lee Morgan chronology
Sonic Boom (1967)	The Procrastinator (1978)	The Sixth Sense (1967)

Alternative cover
- 1995 CD reissue

Alternative cover
- Japanese vinyl (1978)

Alternative cover
- Japanese CD (1998, TOCJ-1629)

The Procrastinator is an album by jazz trumpeter Lee Morgan released posthumously on the Blue Note label, featuring performances by Morgan, Wayne Shorter, Bobby Hutcherson, Herbie Hancock, Ron Carter and Billy Higgins. It was originally issued in 1978 as a double LP (“Jazz Classics Series”, BN-LA582-J2) featuring tracks recorded in three different sessions: July 1967, September 1969 and October 1969. It was the last time Morgan recorded with Shorter in an association that lasted almost eight years.

Alongside the US-issue there were two single album releases in Japan the same year: Lee Morgan All-Star Sextet, which comprised only the session of 1967 (ST-83023/GXF-3023); and Lee Morgan Sextet, which comprised both sessions of 1969 (ST-83024/GXF 3024). The first and remastered CD release, that came out in 1995 as part of the Blue Note "Connoisseur Series", included only the 1967 session. The remaining tracks of the original double album were issued on CD in 1998 in Japan, then in 2003 in the US, as bonus tracks on Sonic Boom.

Six years after Morgan's early death The Procrastinator was the first in a line of releases with previously unissued sessions, that Blue Note launched in a “Classic Series” the following years (Sonic Boom, Tom Cat, Taru and Infinity).

== Reception ==
The Allmusic review by Scott Yanow awarded the album 4½ stars, stating: "It is surprising that Lee Morgan's The Procrastinator was not released when it was recorded in 1967 for the sextet (which includes Wayne Shorter, vibraphonist Bobby Hutcherson, pianist Herbie Hancock, bassist Ron Carter and drummer Billy Higgins) lives up to their potential on a well-rounded set of originals by Morgan and Shorter. The music ranges from the funky 'Party Time' (which sounds like it could have been written by Horace Silver) to more explorative pieces."

Professional ratings
Review scores
Source	Rating
Allmusic	4.5/5 stars
The Penguin Guide to Jazz	3/4 stars
The Rolling Stone Jazz Record Guide	5/5 stars

== Track listing ==
Original double LP (1978, BN-LA582-J2)

1. "The Procrastinator" (Morgan) - 8:06
2. "Party Time" (Morgan) - 6:01
3. "Dear Sir" (Wayne Shorter) - 6:55
4. "Stop Start" (Morgan) - 6:12
5. "Rio" (Wayne Shorter) - 6:11
6. "Soft Touch" (Morgan) - 7:02
7. "Free Flow" (Coleman) - 4:50
8. "Stormy Weather" - (Harold Arlen, Ted Koehler) - 5:44
9. "Mr. Johnson" (Mabern) - 6:11
10. "The Stroker" (Priester) - 5:47
11. "Uncle Rough" (Mabern) - 5:35
12. "Claw-Til-Da" (Roker) - 3:07
13. "Untitled Boogaloo" - 5:40

Recorded on July 14, 1967 (#1–6), September 12 (#8, 9, 13) and October 10, 1969 (#7, 10–12).

Single LP release in Japan (1978, ST-83023/GXF-3023), and 1995 CD reissue

1. "The Procrastinator" (Morgan) - 8:06
2. "Party Time" (Morgan) - 6:01
3. "Dear Sir" (Wayne Shorter) - 6:55
4. "Stop Start" (Morgan) - 6:12
5. "Rio" (Wayne Shorter) - 6:11
6. "Soft Touch" (Morgan) - 7:02

== Personnel ==
Tracks 1–6

- Lee Morgan - trumpet
- Wayne Shorter - tenor sax
- Bobby Hutcherson - vibes
- Herbie Hancock - piano
- Ron Carter - bass
- Billy Higgins - drums

Track 7–13

- Lee Morgan - trumpet
- Julian Priester - trombone
- George Coleman - tenor sax
- Harold Mabern - piano
- Walter Booker - bass
- Mickey Roker - drums
