= The Freedom Rider =

1964 album by Art Blakey and the Jazz Messengers

Studio album by Art Blakey and the Jazz Messengers
- Released: February 1964
- Recorded: February 12, 18 and May 27, 1961
- Studios: Van Gelder Studio, Englewood Cliffs
- Genre: Jazz
- Length: 54:01 (CD reissue)
- Label: Blue Note Records
- Producer: Alfred Lion

Art Blakey and the Jazz Messengers chronology
Pisces (1961)	The Freedom Rider (1964)	Roots & Herbs (1961)

Professional ratings
Review scores
Source	Rating
Allmusic	4.5/5 stars
The Rolling Stone Jazz Record Guide	4/5 stars
The Penguin Guide to Jazz Recordings	3.5/4 stars

The Freedom Rider is an album by jazz drummer Art Blakey and his group the Jazz Messengers, recorded in 1961 and released in 1964 by Blue Note Records. Continuing Blakey's distinct brand of hard bop, this album features compositions from Wayne Shorter, Lee Morgan, Blakey himself, and Kenny Dorham, a former Jazz Messenger. This was the final album by this particular edition of the Jazz Messengers, who had been together for 18 months, as Lee Morgan left after this album and was replaced by Freddie Hubbard.

The title track is a seven-and-a-half-minute solo drum composition by Blakey that combines swing, Latin American and African rhythmic influences, and is named in honor of the Freedom Riders—activists who participated in American Civil Rights Movement Freedom Rides beginning in 1961.

In 2019, to celebrate the 100th Anniversary of Art Blakey’s birth, The Freedom Rider was one of five albums to be reissued in LP special editions by Blue Note Records, as a Vinyl Me, Please exclusive with new liner notes by Evan Haga.

== Track listing ==
1. "Tell It Like It Is" (Shorter) – 7:53
2. "The Freedom Rider" (Blakey) – 7:25
3. "El Toro" (Shorter) – 6:20
4. "Petty Larceny" (Morgan) – 6:14
5. "Blue Lace" (Morgan) – 5:59

Bonus tracks on CD reissue:

6. "Uptight" (Morgan) – 6:12
7. "Pisces" (Morgan) – 6:52
8. "Blue Ching" (Kenny Dorham) – 6:43

== Personnel ==
- Art Blakey — drums
- Lee Morgan — trumpet
- Wayne Shorter — tenor saxophone
- Bobby Timmons — piano
- Jymie Merritt — double bass
