= Standards (Lee Morgan album) =

Studio album by Lee Morgan
- Released: February 10, 1998
- Recorded: January 13, 1967
- Studio: Van Gelder Studio, Englewood Cliffs, NJ
- Genre: Jazz
- Length: 42:05
- Label: Blue Note; Blue Note 23213
- Producer: Alfred Lion

Lee Morgan chronology
| The Rajah (1966) | Standards (1998) | Sonic Boom (1967) |

Standards is an album by the jazz trumpeter Lee Morgan, released on the Blue Note label. It was recorded on January 13, 1967, but not released until 1998; it contains performances by Morgan, Wayne Shorter, Herbie Hancock, Ron Carter, Billy Higgins, James Spaulding, Pepper Adams and Mickey Roker, with arrangements by Duke Pearson.

== Reception ==
The AllMusic review by Scott Yanow stated: "Most of the selections, although allegedly 'standards,' were of more recent vintage (like 'A Lot of Livin' to Do' and 'If I Were a Carpenter'), and even if Morgan and the other musicians play well, nothing too exciting occurs. Although not a dud, it was not a major loss that this recording stayed in the vaults."

Professional ratings
Review scores
| Source | Rating |
|---|---|
| AllMusic | 2.5/5 stars |
| The Penguin Guide to Jazz | 3.5/4 stars |

== Track listing ==
1. "This Is the Life" (Adams, Strouse) - 5:02
2. "God Bless the Child" (Herzog, Holiday) - 7:18
3. "Blue Gardenia" (Lester Lee, Russell) - 5:51
4. "Lot of Livin' to Do" (Adams, Strouse) - 6:02
5. "Somewhere" (Bernstein, Sondheim) - 5:50
6. "If I Were a Carpenter" (Hardin) - 6:08
7. "Blue Gardenia" [Alternate Take] - 5:54

== Personnel ==
- Lee Morgan - trumpet
- Wayne Shorter - tenor saxophone
- James Spaulding - alto saxophone, flute
- Pepper Adams - baritone saxophone
- Herbie Hancock - piano
- Ron Carter - bass
- Mickey Roker - drums
- Duke Pearson - arranger
