= Night Dreamer =

Studio album by Wayne Shorter
- Released: November 1964; 1987
- Recorded: April 29, 1964
- Studio: Van Gelder, Englewood Cliffs, NJ
- Genre: Modal jazz, post-bop
- Length: 40:58 original LP
- Label: Blue Note; BLP 4173; CDP 7 84173 2
- Producer: Alfred Lion

Wayne Shorter chronology
Wayning Moments (1962)	Night Dreamer (1964)	JuJu (1965)

Professional ratings
Review scores
Source	Rating
All About Jazz	4.5/5 stars
AllMusic	4.5/5 stars
The Penguin Guide to Jazz Recordings	3.5/4 stars
The Rolling Stone Jazz Record Guide	4/5 stars

Night Dreamer is the fourth album by American jazz saxophonist Wayne Shorter. It was released in November 1964 by Blue Note Records. With a quintet of trumpeter Lee Morgan, pianist McCoy Tyner, bassist Reggie Workman and drummer Elvin Jones performing six Shorter originals.

In 2005, it was reissued as part of the RVG Edition series with liner notes by Nat Hentoff.

== Concept and compositions ==
At this point of his career, Shorter felt his writing was changing. While the previous compositions had a "lot of detail", this new approach had a simplistic quality to it. "I used to use a lot of chord changes, for instance, but now I can separate the wheat from the chaff."

In an interview with Nat Hentoff, Shorter focused on the album's meaning: "What I'm trying to express here is a sense of judgment approaching - judgment for everything alive from the smallest ant to man. I know that the accepted meaning of "Armageddon" is the last battle between good and evil - whatever it is. But my definition of the judgment to come is a period of total enlightenment in which we will discover what we are and why we're here."

The title song, "Night Dreamer", has mostly a minor-key tonality, which Shorter said "always connotes evening or night to me". It is a 3/4 "floating" piece, yet, "although the beat does float, it also is set in a heavy groove. It's a paradox, in a way, like you'd have in a dream". This explains the "Dreamer" part. Shorter first heard "Oriental Folk Song" as the theme for a commercial, then he discovered it was an old Chinese song. He meant "Virgo" (Shorter's star sign) to be "optimistic", whilst in "Black Nile" he tried to get a flowing feeling, like a "depiction of a river route." "Charcoal Blues" should represent a sort of backtracking piece, linking the past and the present time together: "The old blues and funk were good for their times and place, but what I'm trying to do now is to get the meat out of the old blues while also presaging the different kind of blues to come. [...] I'm both looking back at the good things in those older blues and also laughing at that part of my background". Shorter underlines that the laughter is not mocking but satirical, "from the inside". Ultimately, "Armageddon" was considered by Shorter as the focal point of the album.

== Track listing ==
Original release (1964)

All compositions by Wayne Shorter.
A1. "Night Dreamer"
A2. "Oriental Folk Song"
A3. "Virgo"
B1. "Black Nile"
B2. "Charcoal Blues"
B3. "Armageddon"

CD release (1987)

1. "Night Dreamer" – 7:15
2. "Oriental Folk Song" – 6:50
3. "Virgo" – 7:05
4. "Virgo" [alternate take] – 7:00
5. "Black Nile" – 6:25
6. "Charcoal Blues" – 6:50
7. "Armageddon" – 6:20

Remastered CD release (2005)

1. "Night Dreamer" – 7:15
2. "Oriental Folk Song" – 6:51
3. "Virgo" – 7:07
4. "Black Nile" – 6:28
5. "Charcoal Blues" – 6:54
6. "Armageddon" – 6:23
7. "Virgo" [alternate take] – 7:03

== Personnel ==
Musicians

- Wayne Shorter – tenor saxophone
- Lee Morgan – trumpet
- McCoy Tyner – piano
- Reggie Workman – bass
- Elvin Jones – drums

Production

- Alfred Lion – original recording producer
- Rudy Van Gelder – recording engineer
- Michael Cuscuna – reissue producer
- Francis Wolff – cover photograph
