= The Witch Doctor (album) =

Studio album by Art Blakey and the Jazz Messengers
- Released: 1967
- Recorded: March 14, 1961; Van Gelder Studio, Englewood Cliffs
- Genre: Jazz
- Length: 40:34
- Label: Blue Note; BST 84258
- Producer: Alfred Lion

Art Blakey and the Jazz Messengers chronology
Roots & Herbs (1967)	The Witch Doctor (1967)	Art Blakey and the Jazz Messengers (1961)

Professional ratings
Review scores
Source	Rating
AllMusic	4/5 stars
DownBeat	4.5/5 stars
The Penguin Guide to Jazz Recordings	3.5/4 stars

The Witch Doctor is an album by American jazz drummer and bandleader Art Blakey and his group The Jazz Messengers, recorded on March 14, 1961 and released in 1967 by Blue Note Records. It features performances by Blakey with Lee Morgan, Wayne Shorter, Bobby Timmons, and Jymie Merritt.

== Track listing ==
1. "The Witch Doctor" (Morgan) – 5:32
2. "Afrique" (Morgan) – 6:58
3. "Those Who Sit and Wait" (Shorter) – 5:54
4. "A Little Busy" (Timmons) – 6:18
5. "Joelle" (Shorter) – 5:13
6. "Lost and Found" (Clifford Jordan) – 5:06

Bonus track on CD reissue:

7. "The Witch Doctor" [alternate take] (Morgan) – 5:33

== Personnel ==
- Art Blakey – drums
- Lee Morgan – trumpet, flugelhorn
- Wayne Shorter – tenor saxophone
- Bobby Timmons – piano
- Jymie Merritt – bass
