= Indestructible (Art Blakey album) =

Studio album by Art Blakey and the Jazz Messengers
- Released: Early October 1966
- Recorded: April 24 and May 15, 1964
- Studio: Van Gelder Studio, Englewood Cliffs, NJ
- Genre: Jazz
- Length: 39:05 original LP
- Label: Blue Note; BST 84193
- Producer: Alfred Lion

Art Blakey and the Jazz Messengers chronology
Kyoto (1964)	Indestructible (1966)	Golden Boy (1964)

Professional ratings
Review scores
Source	Rating
Allmusic	4.5/5 stars
DownBeat	4/5 stars
The Penguin Guide to Jazz Recordings	3/4 stars

Indestructible is a jazz album by drummer Art Blakey and his Jazz Messengers. It was recorded in 1964 but not released until 1966, and was Blakey's last recording for Blue Note. The bonus track featured on the CD reissue was originally issued on Pisces.

This was the final recording for half of the band's members: Wayne Shorter would leave to join the Miles Davis Quintet and be replaced (briefly) by John Gilmore, bassist Reggie Workman would be replaced by Victor Sproles, and pianist Cedar Walton would leave to be replaced by John Hicks.

== Track listing ==
1. "The Egyptian" (Fuller) – 10:25
2. "Sortie" (Fuller) – 8:13
3. "Calling Miss Khadija" (Morgan) – 7:21
4. "When Love is New" (Walton) – 6:02
5. "Mr. Jin" (Shorter) – 7:04
6. "It's a Long Way Down" (Shorter) – 5:26 Bonus track on CD

Recorded on April 24 (#5) and May 15 (#1-4), 1964. Bonus track on April 15, 1964.

== Personnel ==
- Art Blakey — drums
- Lee Morgan — trumpet
- Curtis Fuller — trombone
- Wayne Shorter — tenor saxophone
- Cedar Walton — piano
- Reggie Workman — bass
