= Art Blakey and the Jazz Messengers (1961 album) =

Studio album by Art Blakey and the Jazz Messengers
- Released: September 1, 1961
- Recorded: June 13–14, 1961
- Studio: Van Gelder (Englewood Cliffs)
- Genre: Hard bop
- Length: 38:00
- Label: Impulse!
- Producer: Bob Thiele

Art Blakey and the Jazz Messengers chronology
A Night in Tunisia (1961)	Art Blakey and the Jazz Messengers (1961)	Mosaic (1961)

Professional ratings
Review scores
Source	Rating
AllMusic	4/5 stars
Penguin Guide to Jazz (8th ed.)	3.5/4 stars
Down Beat	4.5/5 stars
The Rolling Stone Jazz Record Guide	5/5 stars
Tom Hull	B+

Art Blakey and the Jazz Messengers (stylized as Art Blakey!!!!! Jazz Messengers!!!!! and titled Alamode in Japan) is a studio album by Art Blakey and the Jazz Messengers, released on September 1, 1961, through Impulse! Records. Expanding to a sextet for the first time, it was the group's final recording with Bobby Timmons, who would be replaced by Cedar Walton.

== Reception ==
In his DownBeat review of January 4, 1962, critic Ira Gitler commented: "This is a change of pace from most recent Messenger releases. There is only one original; the rest are standards that have not been overdone." AllMusic reviewer Steven McDonald described it as: "An absolutely wonderful 1961 set from Blakey and company, who demonstrate here how to be note-perfect without leeching away the emotion of a performance."

== Track listing ==
1. "À la Mode" (Curtis Fuller) — 6:40
2. "Invitation" (Bronislau Kaper, Paul Francis Webster) — 7:25
3. "Circus" (Lou Alter, Bob Russell) — 5:12
4. "You Don't Know What Love Is" (Gene de Paul, Don Raye) — 6:55
5. "I Hear a Rhapsody" (Jack Baker, George Fragos, Dick Gasparre) — 6:30
6. "Gee Baby, Ain't I Good to You" (Andy Razaf, Don Redman) — 5:00

== Personnel ==
- Art Blakey — drums
- Lee Morgan — trumpet
- Curtis Fuller — trombone
- Wayne Shorter — tenor saxophone
- Bobby Timmons — piano
- Jymie Merritt — bass
