= Paris Jam Session =

Live album by Art Blakey and the Jazz Messengers
- Released: 1961
- Recorded: December 18, 1959
- Genre: Hard bop
- Length: 42:12
- Label: Fontana (France); 680 207 TL
- Producer: Marcel Romano

Art Blakey and the Jazz Messengers chronology
Art Blakey et les Jazz Messengers au Théâtre des Champs-Élysées (1959)	Paris Jam Session (1961)	The Big Beat (1960)

Paris Jam Session is a live album by Art Blakey and the Jazz Messengers with guest appearances by Bud Powell and Barney Wilen, recorded at the Théâtre des Champs-Élysées in Paris on 18 December 1959. It was released by Fontana (France) originally, by EmArcy in 1961, and subsequently by Verve on CD as part of their Jazz in Paris series.

== Reception ==
Professional ratings
Review scores
Source	Rating
Allmusic	4.5/5 stars
The Guardian	3/5 stars

Allmusic gave the album 4½ stars with Ken Dryden's review stating: "This is one of the essential live dates in Art Blakey's rather extensive discography".

== Track listing ==
1. "Dance of the Infidels" (Bud Powell) — 12:26
2. "Bouncing with Bud" (Gil Fuller, Powell) — 11:38
3. "The Midget" (Lee Morgan) — 11:06
4. "A Night in Tunisia" (Dizzy Gillespie, Frank Paparelli) — 7:02

== Personnel ==
- Art Blakey – drums
- Lee Morgan – trumpet
- Barney Wilen – alto sax (tracks 1–2 only)
- Wayne Shorter – tenor sax
- Bud Powell – piano (tracks 1–2 only)
- Walter Davis Jr. – piano (tracks 3–4 only)
- Jymie Merritt – bass
