= Meet You at the Jazz Corner of the World =

- CD reissue cover

Live album by Art Blakey & the Jazz Messengers
- Released: July 1961 (Vol. 1); May 1962 (Vol. 2); January 8, 2002 (CD Reissue)
- Recorded: 14 September 1960
- Genre: Jazz
- Label: Blue Note; BLP 4054 (Vol. 1); BLP 4055 (Vol. 2)
- Producer: Alfred Lion

Art Blakey & the Jazz Messengers chronology
Like Someone in Love (1960)	Meet You at the Jazz Corner of the World (1961)	Pisces (1961)

Meet You at the Jazz Corner of the World, Vols. 1 & 2 are a pair of separate but related live albums by Art Blakey & the Jazz Messengers recorded at the Birdland jazz club on September 14, 1960 and released on Blue Note in July 1961 and May 1962 respectively. The quintet features horn section Lee Morgan and Wayne Shorter and rhythm section Bobby Timmons, Jymie Merritt and Art Blakey. In 2002, the two LPs were reissued as a double-CD set.

== Background ==
The set consists mainly of standards, and three compositions from former Messenger Hank Mobley. Morgan and Shorter offer one tune each, and both volumes are rounded off by the ubiquitous Miles Davis set closer "The Theme".

== Reception ==
Professional ratings
Review scores
Source	Rating
AllMusic	(Vol. 1)
AllMusic	(Vol. 2)
AllMusic	(2002 RVG)
The Rolling Stone Jazz Record Guide	4/5 stars

The AllMusic review by Lindsay Planer states, "The syncopated and infectiously rhythmic "Night Watch" is highlighted by Shorter, as he begins to fully grasp his improvisational skills that seem to materialize right before the keen-eared listener. He is quickly developing into the undaunted instrumentalist who would revolutionize modern jazz with Miles Davis in the mid-'60s."

Planer's review for the 2002 edition states, "Birdland (aka "the jazz corner of the world") produced some of Art Blakey's (drums) most revered live recordings.... the 2002 complete Meet You at the Jazz Corner of the World would be a welcome addition to the library of most any jazz lover.

== Track listing ==
=== Meet You at the Jazz Corner of the World, Volume 1 ===
Side 1
No.	Title	Writer(s)	Length
1.	"The Opener"	Mobley	8:29
2.	"What Know"	Morgan	10:26
3.	"The Theme"	Miles Davis	1:37

Side 2
No.	Title	Writer(s)	Length
1.	"Round About Midnight"	Bernie Hanighen; Monk; Cootie Williams	9:44
2.	"The Breeze and I"	Ernesto Lecuona; Al Stillman	10:38

=== Meet You at the Jazz Corner of the World, Volume 2 ===
Side 1
No.	Title	Writer(s)	Length
1.	"High Modes"	Mobley	13:09
2.	"Night Watch"	Mobley	8:34

Side 2
No.	Title	Writer(s)	Length
1.	"The Things I Love"	Harold Barlow; Lew Harris	8:26
2.	"The Summit"	Shorter	9:26
3.	"The Theme"	Davis	1:35

- announced by Birdland MC Pee Wee Marquette

=== Meet You at the Jazz Corner of the World – 2002 RVG Edition ===
Disc one
No.	Title	Writer(s)	Length
1.	"Announcement by Pee Wee Marquette"		1:06
2.	"The Opener"	Hank Mobley	8:29
3.	"What Know"	Lee Morgan	10:26
4.	"The Theme"		1:37
5.	"Announcement by Art Blakey"		0:21
6.	"Round About Midnight"	Thelonious Monk	9:44
7.	"The Breeze and I"	Stillman*, Lecuona*, Camarata*	10:38

Disc two
No.	Title	Writer(s)	Length
1.	"Announcement by Pee Wee Marquette & Art Blakey"		1:01
2.	"High Modes"	Hank Mobley	13:09
3.	"Night Watch"	Hank Mobley	8:34
4.	"The Things I Love"	H. Barlow*, L. Harris*	8:26
5.	"The Summit"	Wayne Shorter	9:26
6.	"The Theme"		1:35

== Personnel ==
=== Art Blakey & the Jazz Messengers ===
- Lee Morgan – trumpet
- Wayne Shorter – tenor saxophone
- Bobby Timmons – piano
- Jymie Merritt – bass
- Art Blakey – drums

=== Technical personnel ===
- Alfred Lion – producer
- Rudy Van Gelder – recording engineer, 2002 remaster
