= A Night in Tunisia (1961 album) =

Studio album by Art Blakey & The Jazz Messengers
- Released: May 1961
- Recorded: August 7 and 14, 1960
- Studio: Van Gelder (Englewood Cliffs)
- Genre: Hard bop
- Length: 37:57
- Label: Blue Note; BLP 4049 [mono], BST 84049 [stereo]
- Producer: Alfred Lion

Art Blakey & The Jazz Messengers chronology
The Big Beat (1960)	A Night in Tunisia (1961)	Art Blakey and the Jazz Messengers (1961)

Professional ratings
Review scores
Source	Rating
AllMusic	4/5 stars
DownBeat	4/5 stars
The Rolling Stone Jazz Record Guide	5/5 stars
The Penguin Guide to Jazz Recordings	4/4 stars
Tom Hull	B+

A Night in Tunisia is a studio album by Art Blakey and the Jazz Messengers, released in May 1961 through Blue Note Records. It was recorded in August 1960 at Van Gelder Studio in Englewood Cliffs, New Jersey.

In the original liner notes by Barbara J. Gardner, she wrote: "This album is a prime example of Blakey's expressed desire to showcase his young talent. Not only is there extended solo room for the musicians; further, all but the title tune were written and arranged by the talented junior jazz citizens in his group".

== Reception ==
The contemporaneous DownBeat reviewer praised the soloing, and highlighted Blakey's playing on "Kozo's Waltz": "His solo is truly a remarkable demonstration of modern drumming. This is searing passion and astounding energy, not to mention impeccable time".

== Track listing ==
Side one

1. "A Night in Tunisia" (Dizzy Gillespie, Frank Paparelli) – 11:16
2. "Sincerely Diana" (Wayne Shorter) – 6:50

Side two

1. "So Tired" (Bobby Timmons) – 6:39
2. "Yama" (Lee Morgan) – 6:23
3. "Kozo's Waltz" (Morgan) – 6:49

== Personnel ==
- Art Blakey – drums
- Lee Morgan – trumpet
- Wayne Shorter – tenor saxophone
- Bobby Timmons – piano
- Jymie Merritt – bass
