= The Big Beat (Art Blakey album) =

Studio album by Art Blakey & the Jazz Messengers
- Released: 1960
- Recorded: March 6, 1960
- Studio: Van Gelder Studio; Englewood Cliffs, New Jersey
- Genre: Jazz
- Length: 47:49
- Label: Blue Note; BLP 4029
- Producer: Alfred Lion

Art Blakey & the Jazz Messengers chronology
| Paris Jam Session (1959) | The Big Beat (1960) | A Night in Tunisia (1961) |

Professional ratings
Review scores
| Source | Rating |
|---|---|
| AllMusic | 4/5 stars |
| The Rolling Stone Jazz Record Guide | 4/5 stars |
| The Penguin Guide to Jazz Recordings | 3/4 stars |

The Big Beat is an album by Art Blakey & the Jazz Messengers recorded on March 6, 1960 and released on Blue Note later that year. The quintet features horn section Lee Morgan and Wayne Shorter and rhythm section Bobby Timmons, Jymie Merritt and Blakey.

== Track listing ==
=== Side 1 ===
1. "The Chess Players" (Shorter) – 9:31
2. "Sakeena's Vision" (Shorter) – 6:04
3. "Politely" (Hardman) – 6:04

=== Side 2 ===
1. "Dat Dere" (Timmons) – 8:47
2. "Lester Left Town" (Shorter) – 6:26
3. "It's Only a Paper Moon" (Arlen, Harburg, Rose) – 6:38

=== CD reissue bonus track ===
7. "It's Only a Paper Moon" (alternate take) – 6:19

== Personnel ==
=== The Jazz Messengers ===
- Lee Morgan – trumpet
- Wayne Shorter – tenor saxophone
- Bobby Timmons – piano
- Jymie Merritt – bass
- Art Blakey – drums

=== Technical personnel ===
- Alfred Lion – production
- Rudy Van Gelder – recording engineer, mastering
- Reid Miles – design
- Francis Wolff – photography
- Nat Hentoff – liner notes
