= Bobby Timmons =

American jazz pianist and composer (1935–1974)

Background information
- Born: Robert Henry Timmons; December 19, 1935; Philadelphia, Pennsylvania, U.S.
- Died: March 1, 1974 (aged 38) New York City, U.S.
- Genres: Jazz
- Occupations: Musician; composer
- Instruments: Piano; vibraphone
- Years active: 1950s–1970s
- Labels: Riverside; Prestige; Milestone
- Formerly of: The Jazz Messengers

Robert Henry Timmons (December 19, 1935 – March 1, 1974) was an American jazz pianist and composer. He was a sideman in Art Blakey's Jazz Messengers for two periods (July 1958 to September 1959; February 1960 to June 1961), between which he was part of Cannonball Adderley's band. Several of Timmons' compositions written when part of these bands – including "Moanin'", "Dat Dere", and "This Here" – enjoyed commercial success and brought him more attention. In the early and mid-1960s he led a series of piano trios that toured and recorded extensively.

Timmons was strongly associated with the soul jazz style that he helped initiate. This link to apparently simple writing and playing, coupled with drug and alcohol addiction, led to a decline in his career. Timmons died, aged 38, from cirrhosis. Several critics have commented that his contribution to jazz remains undervalued. (Note: See Playing style and influence section for examples.)

== Early life ==
Timmons was born in Philadelphia, Pennsylvania, the son of a minister. He had a sister, Eleanor. Both of his parents, and several aunts and uncles, played the piano. From an early age Timmons studied music with an uncle, Robert Habershaw, who also taught McCoy Tyner. Timmons first played at the church where his grandfather was minister; this influenced his later jazz playing. He grew up in the same area as other future musicians, including the Heath brothers (Jimmy, Percy, and Tootie) and Lee Morgan. Timmons' first professional performances were in his local area, often as a trio that included Tootie Heath on drums. After graduating from high school Timmons was awarded a scholarship to study at the Philadelphia Musical Academy.

== 1954 to spring 1961 ==
Timmons moved to New York in 1954. He played with Kenny Dorham in 1956, making his recording debut with the trumpeter in a live set in May of that year. He went on to play and record with Chet Baker in 1956–57 (bassist Scott LaFaro was part of this band for a time), Sonny Stitt in 1957, and Maynard Ferguson in 1957–58. He also recorded as a sideman with hornmen Curtis Fuller, Hank Mobley, and Morgan. all for Blue Note Records in 1957.

Timmons became best known as a member of Art Blakey's band the Jazz Messengers, which he was first part of from July 1958 to September 1959, including for a tour of Europe. He was recruited for the Messengers by saxophonist Benny Golson, who said that "He was inventive, [...] He could play bebop and he could play funky – he could play a lot of things, and I thought it was the element that Art needed. He hadn't had anybody quite like Bobby, who could go here or go there, rather than walking in a single corridor." By late 1958 Timmons was sharing bandmate Morgan's East Sixth Street apartment and the pair had bought a piano, allowing Timmons to practice and Morgan to work on composing. From around the time he joined Blakey, Timmons, along with some of his fellow band members, was a heroin user. After leaving Blakey, Timmons joined Cannonball Adderley's band, in October 1959.

Timmons was also known as a composer during this period: The Encyclopedia of Jazz states that his compositions "Moanin'" (from the 1958 album of the same title), "This Here", and "Dat Dere" "helped generate the gospel-tinged 'soul jazz' style of [the] late '50s and early '60s." The first was written when Timmons was first with Blakey; the others were composed when he was with Adderley. "This Here" (sometimes "Dis Here") was a surprise commercial success for Adderley: recorded in concert in 1959, it was released as part of The Cannonball Adderley Quintet in San Francisco album while the band was still on tour, and they discovered its popularity only when they arrived back in New York and found crowds outside the Village Gate, where they were due to play.

Timmons was reported to be dissatisfied with the money he had received from "This Here", and was enticed in February 1960 into leaving Adderley and returning to Blakey's band by the offer of more pay. Timmons then appeared on further well-known albums with the drummer, including A Night in Tunisia, The Freedom Rider and The Witch Doctor. His own recording debut as sole leader was This Here Is Bobby Timmons in 1960, which contained his first versions of his best-known compositions. In the same year, he played on recordings led by Nat Adderley, Arnett Cobb, and Johnny Griffin, among others; on the first of these, Work Song, Timmons did not appear on all of the tracks, because he had been drinking heavily.

== Summer 1961 to 1974 ==
Timmons left Blakey for the second time in June 1961, encouraged by the success of his compositions, including jukebox plays of "Dat Dere", which Oscar Brown had recorded after adding lyrics. Timmons then formed his own bands, initially with Ron Carter on bass and Tootie Heath on drums. They toured around the US, including the West Coast, but played most in and around New York. In the initial stages of this trio, Timmons liked the group sounds of the trios led by Red Garland and Ahmad Jamal. According to Tootie Heath, Timmons was at the peak of his fame at that point, but was addicted to heroin, and used a lot of the money that the band was paid maintaining his habit.

In 1963, Timmons' playing, with Lewis Powers on bass and Roy McCurdy on drums, was described by a Washington Post reviewer as "flexible and adventuresome [...] Glossing over everything is an undeniable sheen of church music and spirituals." In 1965, the same reviewer commented that Timmons was employing musicians who were of much lower ability: "Timmons lacks a certain passion but I wonder if this is not the fault of his sidemen." Timmons started playing vibes in the mid-1960s. He occasionally played organ, but recorded only one track on that instrument – a 1964 version of "Moanin'" on From the Bottom. Recordings as a leader continued, usually as part of a trio or quartet, but, after joining Milestone Records around 1967, Timmons' album Got to Get It! featured him as part of a nonet, playing arrangements by Tom McIntosh.

Timmons' career declined quickly in the 1960s, in part because of drug abuse and alcoholism, and partly as a result of being typecast as a composer and player of seemingly simple pieces of music. In 1968 he made his second - and final - recording for Milestone, Do You Know the Way? In the following year, he played in a quartet led by Sonny Red, with Dexter Gordon on one of the saxophonist's temporary returns to the US from Europe, and in a trio backing vocalist Etta Jones. Timmons continued to play in the early 1970s, mostly in small groups or in combination with other pianists, and mainly in the New York area.

According to saxophonist Jimmy Heath, Timmons joined Clark Terry's big band for a tour of Europe in 1974. He was unwell and drank on the plane to Sweden, and fell while drinking at the bar before the band's first concert, in Malmö. Susceptible to blood clotting, he was flown back to the US. On March 1, 1974, he died from cirrhosis, at the age of 38, at St Vincent's Hospital in New York. He had been in hospital for a month. He was buried in Philadelphia, and was survived by his wife, Estelle, and son, also Bobby.

== Playing style and influence ==
Timmons was known for using block chords, "a style in which the right hand creates the melody and the left hand moves with the rhythm of the right hand, but does not change voicing except to accommodate the chord changes." His use of them was more aggressive, and less melodic, than that of Red Garland. The Penguin Guide to Jazz suggested that "Timmons' characteristic style was a rolling, gospelly funk, perhaps longer on sheer energy than on harmonic sophistication." In the opinion of Scott Yanow, stylistically, "somehow Bobby Timmons never grew beyond where he was in 1960." Gary Giddins, however, highlighted other facets of Timmons' playing: the "lush [Bud] Powell-inspired ballads, his clear, sharp, unsentimental long lines." Carter also identified Powell as a primary influence on Timmons, and commented that his partner in the trio "was very giving, very loyal, played every night like it was his last chance to get it right."

The funky aspects of Timmons' playing influenced fellow pianists, including Les McCann, Ramsey Lewis, and Benny Green. Timmons is often mentioned as being under-rated; jazz writer Marc Myers commented in 2008 that "today, Timmons' contribution to jazz – as an accompanist, writer, leader and innovator of a new sound – is vastly overlooked and undervalued."

== Compositions ==
Timmons wrote "a steady stream of infectious funky tunes", stated Giddins. Timmons dismissed the idea that he was deliberately a composer: "I'm a dilettante as a composer. I have never consciously sat down and tried to write a song." He suggested that his method of composing a new song might involve "whistling, playing around with the notes, or at a club. I'll tell one musician to play this note, another that note, and we kick it around." One account of the creation of "Moanin'" was given by Golson: Timmons had the opening eight bars, which he often played between tunes, but formed the complete song only after Golson encouraged him to add a bridge.

== Personality ==
Tootie Heath reported that, when they were on tour and Timmons was addicted to heroin, Timmons would routinely lie and sometimes pull out a knife to threaten people. On the other hand, Ron Carter, the bassist from that tour, asserted that Timmons offered his bandmates a lot of encouragement to experiment and improve from performance to performance, and that he "was a really multi-talented person and he was just a real sweetheart, a sweetheart of a man". In Golson's words, Timmons "had no ego about him, [...] He was always upbeat, never downbeat, and he never maligned anybody unless it was in a humorous way".

== Discography ==
=== As leader/co-leader ===
Year recorded	Title	Label	Notes
1957	Jenkins, Jordan and Timmons	New Jazz	Quintet, with John Jenkins (alto sax), Clifford Jordan (tenor sax), Wilbur Ware (bass), Dannie Richmond (drums)
1960	This Here Is Bobby Timmons	Riverside	Trio, with Sam Jones (bass), Jimmy Cobb (drums)
1960	Soul Time	Riverside	Quartet, with Blue Mitchell (trumpet), Sam Jones (bass), Art Blakey (drums)
1961	Easy Does It	Riverside	Trio, with Sam Jones (bass), Jimmy Cobb (drums)
1961	In Person	Riverside	Trio, with Ron Carter (bass), Albert Heath (drums); in concert at the Village Vanguard, New York City
1962	Sweet and Soulful Sounds	Riverside	Trio, with Sam Jones (bass), Roy McCurdy (drums)
1963	Born to Be Blue!	Riverside	Trio, with Ron Carter and Sam Jones (bass; separately), Connie Kay (drums)
1964	Live at the Connecticut Jazz Party	Chiaroscuro	Quartet, with Sonny Red (alto sax), Sam Jones (bass), Mickey Roker (drums); in concert
1964	From the Bottom	Riverside	Timmons plays vibes on two tracks, organ on one. Trio, with Sam Jones (bass), Jimmy Cobb (drums); released 1970
1964	Little Barefoot Soul	Prestige	Trio, with Sam Jones (bass), Ray Lucas (drums)
1964	Holiday Soul	Prestige	Trio, with Butch Warren (bass), Walter Perkins (drums)
1964	Chun-King	Prestige	Trio, with Keter Betts (bass), Albert Heath (drums)
1964	Workin' Out!	Prestige	Quartet, with Johnny Lytle (vibes), Keter Betts (bass), William Hinnant (drums); one track is trio, with Sam Jones (bass), Ray Lucas (drums)
1965	Chicken & Dumplin's	Prestige	Timmons plays vibes on two tracks. Trio, with Mickey Bass (bass), Billy Saunders (drums)
1966	The Soul Man!	Prestige	Quartet, with Wayne Shorter (tenor sax), Ron Carter (bass), Jimmy Cobb (drums)
1966	Soul Food	Prestige	Trio, with Mickey Bass (bass), Billy Higgins (drums)
1967	Got to Get It!	Milestone	Nonet, with Joe Farrell and James Moody (flute, tenor sax), Hubert Laws (flute), George Barrow (baritone sax), Jimmy Owens (trumpet, flugelhorn), Eric Gale and Howard Collins (guitar; separately), Ron Carter (bass), Billy Higgins and Jimmy Cobb (drums; separately); four tracks are quartet, with Joe Beck (guitar), Carter, Cobb
1968	Do You Know the Way?	Milestone	Quartet, with Joe Beck (guitar), Bob Cranshaw (electric bass), Jack DeJohnette (drums); 3 tracks are trio, without Beck

=== As sideman ===
Year recorded	Leader	Title	Label
1958	Pepper Adams	10 to 4 at the 5 Spot	Riverside
1959	Cannonball Adderley	The Cannonball Adderley Quintet in San Francisco	Riverside
1960	Cannonball Adderley	Them Dirty Blues	Riverside
1960	Nat Adderley	Work Song	Riverside
1960	Joe Alexander	Blue Jubilee	Jazzland
1956	Chet Baker	Chet Baker Quintette	Crown
1956	Chet Baker	Chet Baker & Crew	Pacific
1956	Chet Baker	Chet Baker Big Band	Pacific
1958	Art Blakey	Moanin'	Blue Note
1958	Art Blakey	Drums Around the Corner	Blue Note
1958	Art Blakey	1958 – Paris Olympia	Fontana
1958	Art Blakey	Des femmes disparaissent (Soundtrack)	Fontana
1958	Art Blakey	Au Club St. Germain, Vol. 1	RCA
1958	Art Blakey	Au Club St. Germain, Vol. 2	RCA
1958	Art Blakey	Au Club St. Germain, Vol. 3	RCA
1959	Art Blakey	At the Jazz Corner of the World, Vol. 1	Blue Note
1959	Art Blakey	At the Jazz Corner of the World, Vol. 2	Blue Note
1959	Art Blakey	Just Coolin'	Blue Note
1959	Art Blakey	Les liaisons dangereuses 1960 (Soundtrack)	Fontana
1960	Art Blakey	The Big Beat	Blue Note
1960	Art Blakey	Like Someone in Love	Blue Note
1960	Art Blakey	A Night in Tunisia	Blue Note
1960	Art Blakey	Meet You at the Jazz Corner of the World, Vol. 1	Blue Note
1960	Art Blakey	Meet You at the Jazz Corner of the World, Vol. 2	Blue Note
1961	Art Blakey	Tokyo 1961	Somethin' Else
1961	Art Blakey	Pisces	Blue Note
1961	Art Blakey	The Witch Doctor	Blue Note
1961	Art Blakey	The Freedom Rider	Blue Note
1961	Art Blakey	Roots & Herbs	Blue Note
1961	Art Blakey	Art Blakey!!!!! Jazz Messengers!!!!!	Impulse!
1958	Kenny Burrell	Blue Lights, Vol. 1	Blue Note
1958	Kenny Burrell	Blue Lights, Vol. 2	Blue Note
1959	Kenny Burrell	On View at the Five Spot Cafe	Blue Note
1960	Arnett Cobb	More Party Time	Prestige
1960	Arnett Cobb	Movin' Right Along	Prestige
1956	Kenny Dorham	'Round About Midnight at the Cafe Bohemia	Blue Note
1956	Kenny Dorham	'Round About Midnight at the Cafe Bohemia, Vol. 2	Blue Note
1956	Kenny Dorham	'Round About Midnight at the Cafe Bohemia, Vol. 3	Blue Note
1962	Kenny Dorham	Matador	United Artists
1959	Art Farmer	Brass Shout	United Artists
1957	Maynard Ferguson	Boy with Lots of Brass	EmArcy
1957	Curtis Fuller	The Opener	Blue Note
1958	Benny Golson	Benny Golson and the Philadelphians	Blue Note
1969	Dexter Gordon	L.T.D.: Live at the Left Bank	Prestige
1969	Dexter Gordon	XXL	Prestige
1960	Johnny Griffin	The Big Soul-Band	Riverside
1960	Sam Jones	The Soul Society	Riverside
1960s	Gloria Lynne	Live at Leo's Casino	Collectables
1962	Johnny Lytle	Nice and Easy	Jazzland
1957	Hank Mobley	Hank	Blue Note
1955	Frank Morgan	Frank Morgan (On unissued tracks available on 1991 edition CD)	Gene Norman Presents
1957	Lee Morgan	The Cooker	Blue Note
1960	Lee Morgan	Lee-Way	Blue Note
1958-59	Anthony Ortega	Jazz for Young Moderns (And Old Buzzards Too) (reissued as Earth Dance)	Bethlehem (Fresh Sound)
1960	Dizzy Reece	Comin' On!	Blue Note
1961	The Riverside Jazz Stars	A Jazz Version of Kean	Riverside
1957	Sonny Stitt	Personal Appearance	Verve
1960	The Young Lions	The Young Lions	Vee-Jay
