= List of recording sessions at Van Gelder Studio in 1960s =

This is a list of recording sessions at Van Gelder Studio in the 1960s.

Rudy Van Gelder commenced recording part-time in 1952 in Hackensack, beginning a long-standing association with the Blue Note label, but soon recorded for other labels including Prestige and Savoy. At the end of the decade, he moved to a purpose-built studio in Englewood Cliffs.

== List of recording sessions ==
Recording date	Album	Artist	Label
1960	The Best of Jean Ritchie	Jean Ritchie	Prestige International
1960	She's Like a Swallow	Bonnie Dobson	Prestige International
January 4, 1960	Crazy! Baby	Jimmy Smith	Blue Note
January 8, 1960	Coleman Hawkins All Stars	Coleman Hawkins featuring Joe Thomas and Vic Dickenson	Swingville
January 12, 1960	Glide On	Bill Jennings with Jack McDuff	Prestige
January 17, 1960, January 25, 1960 & July 10, 1960	Byrd in Flight	Donald Byrd	Blue Note
January 22, 1960	Person to Person	Mildred Anderson	Bluesville
January 23, 1960	Out of the Blue	Sonny Red	Blue Note
January 25, 1960	Brother Jack	Jack McDuff	Prestige
January 29, 1960	At Ease with Coleman Hawkins	Coleman Hawkins	Moodsville
January 31, 1960	Eddie "Lockjaw" Davis with Shirley Scott	Eddie "Lockjaw" Davis and Shirley Scott	Moodsville
February 5, 1960 & February 28, 1960	Sunny Side Up	Lou Donaldson	Blue Note
February 7, 1960	Soul Station	Hank Mobley	Blue Note
February 15, 1960	The Music From The Connection	Freddie Redd Quintet with Jackie McLean	Blue Note
February 16, 1960 & February 17, 1960	More Party Time	Arnett Cobb	Prestige
February 16, 1960 & February 17, 1960	Movin' Right Along	Arnett Cobb	Prestige
February 26, 1960 & August 16, 1960	Cookin' Sherry	Willis Jackson	Prestige
February 26, 1960 & August 16, 1960	Together Again!	Willis Jackson and Jack McDuff	Prestige
February 26, 1960 & December 13, 1961	Together Again, Again	Willis Jackson and Jack McDuff	Prestige
February 29, 1960	Movin' & Groovin'	Horace Parlan	Blue Note
March 1, 1960 & March 2, 1960	The Return of Roosevelt Sykes	Roosevelt Sykes	Bluesville
March 6, 1960	The Big Beat	Art Blakey and The Jazz Messengers	Blue Note
March 7, 1960	Buck Jumpin'	Al Casey	Swingville
March 8, 1960	Blues by Lonnie Johnson	Lonnie Johnson	Bluesville
March 11, 1960	Saying Somethin'!	Gigi Gryce	New Jazz
March 18, 1960	The Happy Jazz of Rex Stewart	Rex Stewart	Swingville
March 22, 1960	Open House	Jimmy Smith	Blue Note
March 22, 1960	Plain Talk	Jimmy Smith	Blue Note
March 22, 1960	Taking Care of Business	Oliver Nelson	New Jazz
March 25, 1960	Yes Indeed!	Claude Hopkins	Swingville
March 29, 1960	Swingin' with Pee Wee	Pee Wee Russell with Buck Clayton	Swingville
March 31, 1960	Rockin' in Rhythm	The Swingville All-Stars featuring Al Sears, Taft Jordan and Hilton Jefferson	Swingville
April 1, 1960	Outward Bound	Eric Dolphy	New Jazz
April 2, 1960	Red Alone	Red Garland	Moodsville
April 2, 1960	Alone with the Blues	Red Garland	Moodsville
April 3, 1960 & July 17, 1960	Comin' On!	Dizzy Reece	Blue Note
April 5, 1960	Blues & Ballads	Lonnie Johnson with Elmer Snowden	Bluesville
April 8, 1960 & March 24, 1961	Workin'	Shirley Scott	Prestige
April 12, 1960	Misty	Eddie "Lockjaw" Davis with Shirley Scott	Moodsville
April 17, 1960	Capuchin Swing	Jackie McLean	Blue Note
April 19, 1960	Lem's Beat	Lem Winchester	New Jazz
April 20, 1960	Us Three	Horace Parlan	Blue Note
April 21, 1960	The New Scene of King Curtis	King Curtis	New Jazz
April 22, 1960	Talk That Talk	Johnny "Hammond" Smith	New Jazz
April 25, 1960	Midnight Special	Jimmy Smith	Blue Note
April 25, 1960	Back at the Chicken Shack	Jimmy Smith	Blue Note
April 26, 1960 & November 15, 1960	Just Blues	Memphis Slim	Bluesville
April 26, 1960 & November 15, 1960	No Strain	Memphis Slim	Bluesville
April 28, 1960	Lee-Way	Lee Morgan	Blue Note
May 3, 1960	The Hap'nin's	Gigi Gryce	New Jazz
May 4, 1960	Jive at Five	Joe Newman	Swingville
May 9, 1960	The Frank Wess Quartet	Frank Wess	Moodsville
May 11, 1960	Good Times	Shakey Jake	Bluesville
May 12, 1960	Soundin' Off	Dizzy Reece	Blue Note
May 13, 1960	The Bud Freeman All-Stars featuring Shorty Baker	Bud Freeman and Shorty Baker	Swingville
May 17, 1960	Soulnik	Doug Watkins	New Jazz
May 18, 1960	The Tommy Flanagan Trio	Tommy Flanagan	Moodsville
May 24, 1960	Right Down Front	The Modern Jazz Disciples	New Jazz
May 27, 1960	Screamin' the Blues	Oliver Nelson	New Jazz
May 31, 1960	Stone Blues	Ken McIntyre	New Jazz
June 3, 1960	Singin' & Swingin'	Betty Roché	Prestige
June 4, 1960	Another Opus	Lem Winchester	New Jazz
June 6, 1960 & June 7, 1960	Images of Curtis Fuller	Curtis Fuller	Savoy
June 7, 1960	The Rat Race Blues	Gigi Gryce	New Jazz
June 16, 1960	Boss Tenor	Gene Ammons	Prestige
June 17, 1960, June 13, 1961 & September 5, 1962	Velvet Soul	Gene Ammons	Prestige
June 17, 1960 & September 5, 1962	Angel Eyes	Gene Ammons	Prestige
June 18, 1960	Look Out!	Stanley Turrentine	Blue Note
June 19, 1960	Open Sesame	Freddie Hubbard	Blue Note
June 21, 1960	Don't Go to Strangers	Etta Jones	Prestige
June 23, 1960	Soul Sister	Shirley Scott	Prestige
June 25, 1960	True Blue	Tina Brooks	Blue Note
June 26, 1960	The Lost Sessions	Duke Pearson	Blue Note
June 28, 1960	Moods	The Three Sounds	Blue Note
June 28, 1960	Feelin' Good	The Three Sounds	Blue Note
June 28, 1960	Looking Ahead	Ken McIntyre with Eric Dolphy	New Jazz
June 29, 1960 & December 16, 1960	Blue Hour	Stanley Turrentine and The Three Sounds	Blue Note
July 1, 1960	Tasty Blues	Little Brother Montgomery	Bluesville
July 5, 1960	Just Us	Roy Haynes Trio	New Jazz
July 8, 1960	Mucho, Mucho	Shirley Scott with the Latin Jazz Quintet	Prestige
July 8, 1960 & July 9, 1960	Horace-Scope	Horace Silver Quintet	Blue Note
July 12, 1960	Tough 'Duff	Jack McDuff	Prestige
July 14, 1960	Speakin' My Piece	Horace Parlan	Blue Note
July 15, 1960	Halleloo-Y'-All	Red Garland	Prestige
July 15, 1960 & March 16, 1961	Soul Burnin'	Red Garland	Prestige
July 22, 1960	Midnight Sun	Lou Donaldson	Blue Note
August 2, 1960	Testifying	Larry Young	New Jazz
August 4, 1960	Flight to Jordan	Duke Jordan	Blue Note
August 6, 1960	A.T.'s Delight	Art Taylor	Blue Note
August 7, 1960 & August 14, 1960	A Night in Tunisia	Art Blakey and the Jazz Messengers	Blue Note
August 7, 1960 & August 14, 1960	Like Someone in Love	Art Blakey and the Jazz Messengers	Blue Note
August 9, 1960	Forrest Fire	Jimmy Forrest	New Jazz
August 11, 1960	Midnight Special	Al Smith	Bluesville
August 13, 1960	Shades of Redd	Freddie Redd	Blue Note
August 15, 1960	Out There	Eric Dolphy	New Jazz
August 19, 1960	Caribé	Latin Jazz Quintet with Eric Dolphy	New Jazz
August 22, 1960	Down Home Blues	Brownie McGhee and Sonny Terry	Bluesville
August 22, 1960	Blues & Folk	Brownie McGhee and Sonny Terry	Bluesville
August 22, 1960	Blues All Around My Head	Brownie McGhee and Sonny Terry	Bluesville
August 23, 1960	Nocturne	Oliver Nelson with Lem Winchester	Moodsville
August 24, 1960	Harlem Street Singer	Blind Gary Davis	Bluesville
August 30, 1960	South Side Soul	John Wright Trio	Prestige
September 1, 1960 & January 18, 1959	Jackie's Bag	Jackie McLean	Blue Note
September 1, 1960 & October 20, 1960	Back to the Tracks	Tina Brooks	Blue Note
September 1, 1960	Street Singer	Jackie McLean and Tina Brooks	Blue Note
September 2, 1960	Battle Stations	Eddie "Lockjaw" Davis and Johnny Griffin	Prestige
September 9, 1960	Soul Battle	Oliver Nelson, King Curtis and Jimmy Forrest	Prestige
September 9, 1960, September 1 and October 19, 1961 & June 1, 1962	Soul Street	Jimmy Forrest	New Jazz
September 14, 1960	The Honeydripper	Roosevelt Sykes	Bluesville
September 15, 1960	Slim's Shout	Sunnyland Slim	Bluesville
September 16, 1960 & March 30, 1961	Something Nice	Etta Jones	Prestige
September 18, 1960	Soul Meeting	King Curtis	Prestige
September 20, 1960	Trane Whistle	Eddie "Lockjaw" Davis Big Band	Prestige
September 25, 1960 & February 5 and 13, 1962	The Complete Blue Note 45 Sessions	Ike Quebec	Blue Note
September 26, 1960	No More in Life	Mildred Anderson	Bluesville
September 27, 1960	Like Cozy	Shirley Scott	Moodsville
September 30, 1960	Young Blues	Larry Young	New Jazz
October 3, 1960 & November 2, 4 and 8, 1960	The Great Kai & J. J.	Kai Winding and J. J. Johnson	Impulse!
October 6, 1960	Brownie's Blues	Brownie McGhee	Bluesville
October 7, 1960	Lem Winchester with Feeling	Lem Winchester	Moodsville
October 13, 1960	Sonny's Story	Sonny Terry	Bluesville
October 14, 1960	Gettin' the Message	Johnny "Hammond" Smith with Lem Winchester	Prestige
October 18, 1960	Tate-a-Tate	Buddy Tate with Clark Terry	Swingville
October 26, 1960	Sonny Is King	Sonny Terry	Bluesville
October 26, 1960	Last Night Blues	Lightnin' Hopkins	Bluesville
October 31, 1960	Sizzlin'	Arnett Cobb	Prestige
November 1, 1960	Ballads by Cobb	Arnett Cobb	Moodsville
November 6, 1960	Goin' Up	Freddie Hubbard	Blue Note
November 7, 1960	Tired of Wandering	Arbee Stidham	Bluesville
November 8, 1960	Nice 'n' Tasty	John Wright Trio	Prestige
November 9, 1960	Lightnin'	Lightnin' Hopkins	Bluesville
November 9, 1960	Trouble Blues	Curtis Jones	Bluesville
November 10, 1960	The Al Casey Quartet	Al Casey	Moodsville
November 13, 1960	Roll Call	Hank Mobley	Blue Note
November 17, 1960	Mouth Harp Blues	Shakey Jake	Bluesville
November 17, 1960, November 21, 1960, November 23 & December 13, 1960	The Incredible Kai Winding Trombones	Kai Winding	Impulse!
November 18, 1960, November 30, 1960 & December 10 and 15, 1960	Out of the Cool	Gil Evans Orchestra	Impulse!
November 26, 1960 & October 27, 1961	First Session	Grant Green	Blue Note
November 29, 1960	Swing's the Thing	Al Sears	Swingville
December 2, 1960	Let's Swing!	Budd Johnson Quintet	Swingville
December 6, 1960	Headin' South	Horace Parlan	Blue Note
December 6, 1960	Latin Soul	Latin Jazz Quintet	New Jazz
December 11, 1960	Undercurrent	Kenny Drew	Blue Note
December 13, 1960 & December 14, 1960	Here We Come	The Three Sounds	Blue Note
December 13, 1960 & December 14, 1960	It Just Got to Be	The Three Sounds	Blue Note
December 16, 1960	Misirlou	Jimmy Neely Trio	Tru-Sound
December 20, 1960	Buck & Buddy	Buck Clayton and Buddy Tate	Swingville
December 21, 1960	Far Cry	Eric Dolphy with Booker Little	New Jazz
December 26, 1960 & December 27, 1960	Genius + Soul = Jazz	Ray Charles	Impulse!
December 28, 1960	Losing Game	Lonnie Johnson	Bluesville
December 30, 1960	Night Hawk	Coleman Hawkins	Swingville
1961	Let's Misbehave	Billy Dee Williams	Lively Arts
1961	Say No to the Devil	Reverend Gary Davis	Bluesville
January 3, 1961	Interlude	Billy Taylor	Moodsville
January 8, 1961	Bluesnik	Jackie McLean	Blue Note
January 10, 1961 & April 11, 1961	In My Solitude	Willis Jackson	Moodsville
January 10, 1961 & April 11, 1961	Really Groovin'	Willis Jackson	Prestige
January 15, 1961	Whistle Stop	Kenny Dorham	Blue Note
January 17, 1961	Redd's Blues	Freddie Redd	Blue Note
January 17, 1961	Shorty & Doc	Shorty Baker and Doc Cheatham	Swingville
January 20, 1961	Comin' Your Way	Stanley Turrentine	Blue Note
January 23, 1961	Here 'Tis	Lou Donaldson	Blue Note
January 24, 1961	Lightly and Politely	Betty Roché	Prestige
January 26, 1961	Nice an' Cool	Gene Ammons	Moodsville
January 27, 1961	Jug	Gene Ammons	Prestige
January 28, 1961	Grant's First Stand	Grant Green	Blue Note
January 30, 1961	Face to Face	Baby Face Willette	Blue Note
February 3, 1961	The Honeydripper	Jack McDuff	Prestige
February 12, 1961, May 27, 1961 & April 15, 1964	Pisces	Art Blakey and The Jazz Messengers	Blue Note
February 14, 1961 & May 12, 1961	Stimulation	Johnny "Hammond" Smith	Prestige
February 14, 1961 & May 12, 1961	Opus De Funk	Johnny "Hammond" Smith	Prestige
February 17, 1961	Groovin' with Buddy Tate	Buddy Tate	Swingville
February 18, 1961 & May 27, 1961	The Freedom Rider	Art Blakey and The Jazz Messengers	Blue Note
February 18, 1961 & May 27, 1961	Roots & Herbs	Art Blakey and The Jazz Messengers	Blue Note
February 21, 1961	Let's Jam	Claude Hopkins with Buddy Tate and Joe Thomas	Swingville
February 23, 1961	The Blues and the Abstract Truth	Oliver Nelson	Impulse!
February 28, 1961	The Hawk Relaxes	Coleman Hawkins	Moodsville
March 1, 1961	Straight Ahead	Oliver Nelson	New Jazz
March 2, 1961	The Waiting Game	Tina Brooks	Blue Note
March 7, 1961	Satin Doll	Shirley Scott	Prestige
March 7, 1961	This Is Walt Dickerson!	Walt Dickerson	New Jazz
March 14, 1961	Here's Jaki	Jaki Byard	New Jazz
March 14, 1961	The Witch Doctor	Art Blakey and The Jazz Messengers	Blue Note
March 16, 1961	Rediscovered Masters	Red Garland	Prestige
March 17, 1961	Good 'n' Groovy	Joe Newman with Frank Foster	Swingville
March 18, 1961	On the Spur of the Moment	Horace Parlan	Blue Note
March 21, 1961	It's About Time	Jimmy Hamilton	Swingville
March 26, 1961	Workout	Hank Mobley	Blue Note
April 1, 1961	Green Street	Grant Green	Blue Note
April 4, 1961	Can't Help Swinging	Jimmy Hamilton	Swingville
April 9, 1961	Hub Cap	Freddie Hubbard	Blue Note
April 14, 1961 & May 19, 1961	Things Ain't What They Used to Be	Prestige Swing Festival featuring Coleman Hawkins, Al Sears, Jimmy Hamilton and Pee Wee Russel	Swingville
April 17, 1961	Chant	Donald Byrd	Blue Note
April 18, 1961	Out of the Forrest	Jimmy Forrest	Prestige
April 25, 1961	Trouble in Mind	King Curtis	Tru-Sound
April 27, 1961	Gravy Train	Lou Donaldson	Blue Note
May 2, 1961	The Cat Walk	Donald Byrd	Blue Note
May 5, 1961	A Sense of Direction	Walt Dickerson	New Jazz
May 6, 1961	Doin' Allright	Dexter Gordon	Blue Note
May 9, 1961	Joe's Hap'nin's	Joe Newman	Swingville
May 9, 1961	Dexter Calling...	Dexter Gordon	Blue Note
May 9, 1961, May 5, 1962 & June 25, 1962	Landslide	Dexter Gordon	Blue Note
May 11, 1961	New Ideas	Don Ellis	New Jazz
May 18, 1961 & May 22, 1961	Perceptions	Dizzy Gillespie	Verve
May 22, 1961	Stop and Listen	Baby Face Willette	Blue Note
May 23, 1961 & June 4, 1961	Africa/Brass	John Coltrane	Impulse!
May 23, 1961	The Music of Ahmed Abdul-Malik	Ahmed Abdul-Malik	New Jazz
May 23, 1961	Hot Sauce	Juan Amalbert's Latin Jazz Quintet	Tru-Sound
May 23, 1961 & August 22, 1962	Sounds of Africa	Ahmed Abdul-Malik	New Jazz
May 30, 1961	Let It Roll	Ernestine Allen	Tru-Sound
June 2, 1961	Hip Soul	Shirley Scott	Prestige
June 4, 1961	Sunday Mornin'	Grant Green	Blue Note
June 8, 1961	Dearly Beloved	Stanley Turrentine	Blue Note
June 9, 1961 & July 25 and 28, 1961	So Warm	Etta Jones	Prestige
June 13, 1961 & April 13, 1962	Late Hour Special	Gene Ammons	Prestige
June 13, 1961, December 1, 1961, January 23 and April 13, 1962	Soul Summit Vol. 2	Gene Ammons, Etta Jones and Jack McDuff	Prestige
June 13, 1961 & June 14, 1961	Art Blakey!!!!! Jazz Messengers!!!!!	Art Blakey and The Jazz Messengers	Impulse!
June 17, 1961	Pleasure Bent	Roland Alexander with Marcus Belgrave	New Jazz
June 18, 1961	Up & Down	Horace Parlan	Blue Note
June 20, 1961	Where?	Ron Carter with Eric Dolphy and Mal Waldron	New Jazz
June 21, 1961	These Dues	Clea Bradford	Tru-Sound
June 22, 1961	Straight Life	Jimmy Smith	Blue Note
June 23, 1961	Makin' Out	John Wright	Prestige
June 27, 1961	The Quest	Mal Waldron	New Jazz
June 30, 1961	Mood Indigo!!!	Taft Jordan	Moodsville
July 11, 1961	Kirk's Work	Roland Kirk with Jack McDuff	Prestige
July 11, 1961 & January 5, 1962	It's Party Time with King Curtis	King Curtis	Tru-Sound
July 13, 1961	Idle Hours	Lonnie Johnson with Victoria Spivey	Bluesville
July 14, 1961	Goodnight, It's Time to Go	Jack McDuff	Prestige
July 20, 1961 & July 27, 1961	Uptown and Lowdown	Cliff Jackson's Washboard Wanderers / Dick Wellstood's Wallerites	Swingville
July 21, 1961	Everything's Mellow	Clark Terry	Moodsville
August 1, 1961	Grantstand	Grant Green	Blue Note
August 10, 1961	A Little More Faith	Reverend Gary Davis	Bluesville
August 13, 1961	Hey There	The Three Sounds	Blue Note
August 13, 1961 & March 8, 1962	Babe's Blues	The Three Sounds	Blue Note
August 16, 1961	Songs We Taught Your Mother	Alberta Hunter, Lucille Hegamin and Victoria Spivey	Bluesville
August 21, 1961	Ready for Freddie	Freddie Hubbard	Blue Note
August 22, 1961	Blue Seven	Shirley Scott	Prestige
August 23, 1961 & August 24, 1961	Blue Hodge	Johnny Hodges	Verve
August 25, 1961	Main Stem	Oliver Nelson	Prestige
August 29, 1961	Remembering	Grant Green	Blue Note
September 1, 1961	Sit Down and Relax with Jimmy Forrest	Jimmy Forrest	Prestige
September 5, 1961	Eastern Sounds	Yusef Lateef	Moodsville
September 9, 1961	Let Me Tell You 'Bout It	Leo Parker	Blue Note
September 12, 1961, November 3, 1961 & December 15, 1961	It's Party Time with Jesse Powell	Jesse Powell	Tru-Sound
September 13, 1961	ZT's Blues	Stanley Turrentine	Blue Note
September 14, 1961 & October 6, 10 and 31, 1961	Into the Hot	Gil Evans Orchestra	Impulse!
September 15, 1961	Buck & Buddy Blow the Blues	Buck Clayton and Buddy Tate	Swingville
September 19, 1961 & September 22, 1961	Old Gold	King Curtis	Tru-Sound
September 21, 1961	Royal Flush	Donald Byrd	Blue Note
September 25, 1961 & June 7, 1963	A Man with a Horn	Lou Donaldson	Blue Note
September 29, 1961 & November 10, 1961	Afro/American Sketches	Oliver Nelson	Prestige
October 2, 1961	Mosaic	Art Blakey and The Jazz Messengers	Blue Note
October 12, 1961 & October 20, 1961	Rollin' with Leo	Leo Parker	Blue Note
October 16, 1961	All the Sad Young Men	Anita O'Day with the Gary McFarland Orchestra	Verve
October 17, 1961 & October 18, 1961	Up Tight!	Gene Ammons	Prestige
October 17, 1961 & October 18, 1961	Boss Soul!	Gene Ammons	Prestige
October 19, 1961	Most Much!	Jimmy Forrest	Prestige
October 26, 1961	A Fickle Sonance	Jackie McLean	Blue Note
November 1, 1961	Evidence	Steve Lacy with Don Cherry	New Jazz
November 13, 1961	Leapin' and Lopin'	Sonny Clark	Blue Note
November 17, 1961	Hip Twist	Shirley Scott	Prestige
November 17, 1961	Shirley Scott Plays Horace Silver	Shirley Scott	Prestige
November 26, 1961	Heavy Soul	Ike Quebec	Blue Note
November 28, 1961	Twisting the Jug	Gene Ammons with Joe Newman and Jack McDuff	Prestige
November 28, 1961 & December 18, 1961	Buhaina's Delight	Art Blakey and The Jazz Messengers	Blue Note
November 30, 1961	Leonard Gaskin at the Jazz Band Ball	Leonard Gaskin	Swingville
December 1, 1961	On With It!	Gene Ammons	Prestige
December 5, 1961	Another Workout	Hank Mobley	Blue Note
December 8, 1961 & March 9, 1962	It's the Blues Man!	Eddie Kirkland	Tru-Sound
December 9, 1961	It Might as Well Be Spring	Ike Quebec	Blue Note
December 11, 1961	Free Form	Donald Byrd	Blue Note
December 11, 1961 & December 12, 1961	Johnny Hodges with Billy Strayhorn and the Orchestra	Johnny Hodges with Billy Strayhorn	Verve
December 14, 1961	The Lost Sessions	Tadd Dameron	Blue Note
December 14, 1961 & December 15, 1961	Statements	Milt Jackson	Impulse!
December 16, 1961 & December 23, 1961	Blue & Sentimental	Ike Quebec	Blue Note
December 19, 1961	The Last Amen	John Wright	New Jazz
December 21, 1961, September 18, 1962 & November 13, 1962	Ballads	John Coltrane	Impulse!
December 23, 1961	Gooden's Corner	Grant Green	Blue Note
December 29, 1961	Into Something	Yusef Lateef	New Jazz
1962	Sabrina! (Pachanga)	Alfredito Valdez	Tru-Sound
1962	Burgess Meredith Reads Ray Bradbury	Burgess Meredith	Lively Arts
January 2, 1962	That's Where It's At	Stanley Turrentine	Blue Note
January 2, 1962	Good Old Broadway	Coleman Hawkins	Moodsville
January 10, 1962 & January 11, 1962	Inception	McCoy Tyner	Impulse!
January 13, 1962	Nigeria	Grant Green	Blue Note
January 16, 1962	Relativity	Walt Dickerson	New Jazz
January 17, 1962 & January 18 and 19, 1962	Think Well of Me	Jack Teagarden	Verve
January 20, 1962	Easy Living	Ike Quebec	Blue Note
January 22, 1962	Look Out!	Johnny "Hammond" Smith with Seldon Powell	New Jazz
January 23, 1962	Plays Fats Waller	Jimmy Smith	Blue Note
January 23, 1962	Brother Jack Meets the Boss	Jack McDuff and Gene Ammons	Prestige
January 24, 1962	The African Beat	Art Blakey and the Afro-Drum Ensemble	Blue Note
January 30, 1962	Hi-Fly	Jaki Byard	New Jazz
January 31, 1962	Oleo	Grant Green	Blue Note
February 4, 1962, June 27 and 28, 1962 & October 10, 1959	Standards	The Three Sounds	Blue Note
February 5, 1962 & February 13, 1962	With a Song in My Heart	Ike Quebec	Blue Note
February 5, 1962 & April 9, 1962	Hootin' 'n Tootin'	Fred Jackson	Blue Note
February 8, 1962 & February 9, 1962	From the Heart	Etta Jones	Prestige
February 16, 1962	Stitt Meets Brother Jack	Sonny Stitt and Jack McDuff	Prestige
February 19, 1962	Soul Summit	Gene Ammons and Sonny Stitt with Brother Jack McDuff	Prestige
February 20, 1962	Sam "The Man" Taylor Plays The Bad and the Beautiful	Sam Taylor	Moodsville
February 27, 1962	Groove Street	Larry Young	Prestige
March 1, 1962	Born to Be Blue	Grant Green	Blue Note
March 7, 1962 & March 8, 1962	Black Orchid	The Three Sounds	Blue Note
March 13, 1962	Asia Minor	Dizzy Reece	New Jazz
March 19, 1962	Let Freedom Ring	Jackie McLean	Blue Note
March 21, 1962 & March 22, 1962	Count Basie and the Kansas City 7	Count Basie	Impulse!
March 22, 1962	Southern Comfort	Frank Wess	Prestige
March 23, 1962	Honi Gordon Sings	Honi Gordon	Prestige
March 26, 1962 & March 28, 1962	Bashin': The Unpredictable Jimmy Smith	Jimmy Smith	Verve
March 30, 1962 & April 3, 1962	The Jazz Version of No Strings	Coleman Hawkins	Moodsville
March 31, 1962	Thunderbird	Willis Jackson	Prestige
March 31, 1962 & April 22, 1962	Down Home Turn Around	Buddy Lucas	Tru-Sound
April 1962	Dave Van Ronk, Folksinger	Dave Van Ronk	Prestige International
April 2, 1962 & April 17, 1962	My Hour of Need	Dodo Greene	Blue Note
April 6, 1962 & May 4, 1962	Lonely and Blue	Etta Jones	Prestige
April 7, 1962 & May 29, 1962	Peace in the Valley	The Gate City Singers	Tru-Sound
April 10, 1962	Mr. Soul	John Wright	Prestige
April 10, 1962	BBB & Co.	Benny Carter, Ben Webster and Barney Bigard	Swingville
April 11, 1962 & June 19, 20, and 29, 1962	Coltrane	John Coltrane	Impulse!
April 13, 1962, September 5, 1962, November 26, 1954 & November 4, 1955	Sock!	Gene Ammons	Prestige
April 14, 1962	The Soulful Moods of Gene Ammons	Gene Ammons	Moodsville
April 20, 1962	The Chant	Juan Amalbert's Latin Jazz Quintet	Tru-Sound
April 24, 1962 & April 25, 1962	Cabin in the Skiy	Curtis Fuller	Impulse!
April 26, 1962 & September 7, 1962	The Latin Bit	Grant Green	Blue Note
May 1, 1962	Goin' to the Meeting	Eddie "Lockjaw" Davis	Prestige
May 3, 1962	Elder Don	Don Wilkerson	Blue Note
May 3, 1962 & June, 1962	We've Come This Far by Faith	The Capitol City Stars	Tru-Sound
May 9, 1962	Blues on the Other Side	Mike Mainieri Quartet	Argo
May 9, 1962	The Natural Soul	Lou Donaldson	Blue Note
May 11, 1962 & May 15, 1962	Clark Terry Plays the Jazz Version of All American	Clark Terry	Moodsville
May 16, 1962 & May 23, 1962	Out of the Afternoon	Roy Haynes	Impulse!
May 28, 1962	Takin' Off	Herbie Hancock	Blue Note
June 5, 1962	Mr. Allen	Red Allen	Swingville
June 12, 1962	Johnny "Hammond" Cooks with Gator Tail	Johnny "Hammond" Smith with Willis Jackson	Prestige
June 14, 1962 & February 3, 1967	Hipnosis	Jackie McLean	Blue Note
June 18, 1962	Preach Brother!	Don Wilkerson	Blue Note
June 26, 1962	"Goodnight My Love" / "You Can Trust in Me"	Faye Adams	Prestige
June 29, 1962 & October 24, 1962	Hey! Hey! Hey!	Rhoda Scott Trio	Tru-Sound
July 2, 1962	The Artistry of Freddie Hubbard	Freddie Hubbard	Impulse!
July 3, 1962	"I've Got You On My Mind" / "Lover's Reverie"	Jimmy Grissom	Prestige
July 13, 1962 & July 14, 1962	The Tokyo Blues	Horace Silver	Blue Note
July 18, 1962 & July 19 and 26, 1962	Suspense Themes in Jazz	Kai Winding	Verve
August 14, 1962	Empathy	Shelly Manne and Bill Evans	Verve
August 16, 1962	Coleman Hawkins Plays Make Someone Happy from Do Re Mi	Coleman Hawkins	Moodsville
August 18, 1962	Duke Ellington Meets Coleman Hawkins	Duke Ellington and Coleman Hawkins	Impulse!
August 23, 1962	Down to Earth	Freddie Roach	Blue Note
August 23, 1962	Darktown Strutters Ball	Leonard Gaskin Dixielanders	Swingville
August 27, 1962	Go!	Dexter Gordon	Blue Note
August 28, 1962	Dixieland Hits Country & Western	Leonard Gaskin Dixielanders	Swingville
August 29, 1962	A Swingin' Affair	Dexter Gordon	Blue Note
September 4, 1962	Soul Cookin'	Thornel Schwartz with Bill Leslie	Argo
September 6, 1962 & September 7, 1962	Bossa Nova Carnival	Dave Pike with Clark Terry and Kenny Burrell	New Jazz
September 9, 1962 & September 11, 1962	Today and Now	Coleman Hawkins	Impulse!
September 9, 1962	Bad! Bossa Nova	Gene Ammons	Prestige
September 12, 1962 & September 17, 1962	Desafinado	Coleman Hawkins	Impulse!
September 14, 1962	Bluesy Burrell	Kenny Burrell with Coleman Hawkins	Moodsville
September 18, 1962 & April 29, 1963	Impressions	John Coltrane	Impulse!
September 18, 1962 & September 20, 1962	Passin' Thru	Chico Hamilton Quintet	Impulse!
September 18, 1962 & March 15, 1965	The Dealer	Chico Hamilton	Impulse!
September 19, 1962 & October 12, 1962	Portrait of Sheila	Sheila Jordan	Blue Note
September 21, 1962	To My Queen	Walt Dickerson	New Jazz
September 26, 1962	Duke Ellington & John Coltrane	Duke Ellington and John Coltrane	Impulse!
September 28, 1962	Tippin' the Scales	Jackie McLean	Blue Note
October 5, 1962	Soul Samba	Ike Quebec	Blue Note
October 9, 1962	When There Are Grey Skies	Red Garland	Prestige
October 10, 1962	Hub-Tones	Freddie Hubbard	Blue Note
October 12, 1962–October 15, 1962	Blue Genes	The Three Sounds	Verve
October 12, 1962–October 15, 1962	Anita O'Day & the Three Sounds	Anita O'Day and The Three Sounds	Verve
October 18, 1962	Jubilee Shout!!!	Stanley Turrentine	Blue Note
October 19, 1962	Diggin' the Chicks	Bill Leslie	Argo
October 23, 1962	Screamin'	Jack McDuff	Prestige
October 30, 1962	Bossa Nova Plus	Willis Jackson	Prestige
November 14, 1962	Reaching Fourth	McCoy Tyner	Impulse!
November 15, 1962	I Only Have Eyes for You	Eddie "Lockjaw" Davis	Prestige
November 15, 1962	Trackin'	Eddie "Lockjaw" Davis	Prestige
November 26, 1962 & January 22, 1965	Bossa Nova Bacchanal	Charlie Rouse	Blue Note
November 28, 1962 & February 4 and 12, 1963	Love Shout	Etta Jones	Prestige
November 30, 1962	Goin' West	Grant Green	Blue Note
December 5, 1962	Happy Talk	Shirley Scott	Prestige
December 10, 1962	Ted Curson Plays Fire Down Below	Ted Curson	Prestige
December 12, 1962	Limbo Carnival	Dave Pike	Prestige
December 19, 1962	Neapolitan Nights	Willis Jackson	Prestige
December 20, 1962 & December 23, 1962	Macanudo	Ahmad Jamal	Argo
December 21, 1962	Feelin' the Spirit	Grant Green	Blue Note
December 26, 1962	Free	Benny Golson	Argo
December 27, 1962	Here to Stay	Freddie Hubbard	Blue Note
December 28, 1962	Dave Pike Plays the Jazz Version of Oliver!	Dave Pike	Moodsville
January 8, 1963	Somethin' Slick!	Jack McDuff	Prestige
January 8, 1963	Midnight Blue	Kenny Burrell	Blue Note
January 8, 1963 & February 26, 1963	Crash!	Kenny Burrell with the Jack McDuff Quartet	Prestige
January 10, 1963	The Soul Is Willing	Shirley Scott with Stanley Turrentine	Prestige
January 12, 1963	A New Perspective	Donald Byrd	Blue Note
January 18, 1963 & February 13, 1963	Never Let Me Go	Stanley Turrentine	Blue Note
January 21, 1963 & March 11, 1963	Mo' Greens Please	Freddie Roach	Blue Note
January 24, 1963	Good Gracious!	Lou Donaldson	Blue Note
January 24, 1963	Yo Ho! Poor You, Little Me	Frank Wess	Prestige
January 29, 1963	Having a Ball	Al Grey	Argo
January 30, 1963	French Cookin'	Budd Johnson	Argo
January 31, 1963	I'm Movin' On	Jimmy Smith	Blue Note
January 31, 1963	Pony Poindexter Plays the Big Ones	Pony Poindexter	New Jazz
January 31, 1963, February 28, 1963 & June 27, 1963	Gumbo!	Booker Ervin with Pony Poindexter and Larry Young	Prestige
February 1, 1963	Bucket!	Jimmy Smith	Blue Note
February 4, 1963, August 15 & September 3, 1963	I'm Shooting High	Gildo Mahones	Prestige
February 4, 1963, August 15, 1963, September 3, 1963 & and June 4, 1964	The Great Gildo	Gildo Mahones	Prestige
February 7, 1963	Rockin' the Boat	Jimmy Smith	Blue Note
February 8, 1963	Prayer Meetin'	Jimmy Smith with Stanley Turrentine	Blue Note
February 11, 1963 & June 14, 1962	Vertigo	Jackie McLean	Blue Note
February 15, 1963	Happy Frame of Mind	Horace Parlan	Blue Note
February 20, 1963 & & June 7, 1963	Blues for Lou	Grant Green	Blue Note
March 4, 1963	Nights of Ballads & Blues	McCoy Tyner	Impulse!
March 6, 1963 & November 18, 1963	Live at Birdland	John Coltrane	Impulse!
March 6, 1963	Both Directions at Once: The Lost Album	John Coltrane	Impulse!
March 7, 1963	John Coltrane and Johnny Hartman	John Coltrane and Johnny Hartman	Impulse!
March 7, 1963 & October 2, 1963	No Room for Squares	Hank Mobley	Blue Note
March 7, 1963 & February 5, 1965	The Turnaround!	Hank Mobley	Blue Note
March 7, 1963, October 2, 1963, February 4, 1965, & June 17, 1966	Straight No Filter	Hank Mobley	Blue Note
March 8, 1963	Lucky Thompson Plays Jerome Kern and No More	Lucky Thompson	Moodsville
March 11, 1963 & & May 2, 1963	The Body & the Soul	Freddie Hubbard	Impulse!
March 19, 1963	My Point of View	Herbie Hancock	Blue Note
March 26, 1963	Loose...	Willis Jackson	Prestige
March 27, 1963, April 2, 1963 & October 22, 1964	Freedom	Kenny Burrell	Blue Note
April 1, 1963	Una Mas	Kenny Dorham	Blue Note
April 5, 1963	Along Came John	John Patton	Blue Note
April 6, 1963	Cracklin'	Roy Haynes with Booker Ervin	New Jazz
April 25, 1963	African High Life	Solomon Ilori	Blue Note
April 30, 1963	One Step Beyond	Jackie McLean	Blue Note
May 7, 1963 & May 8, 1963	Silver's Serenade	Horace Silver	Blue Note
May 7, 1963 & May 8, 1963	The Message	Illinois Jacquet	Argo
May 16, 1963	Am I Blue	Grant Green	Blue Note
May 21, 1963	Soul Sisters	Gloria Coleman featuring Pola Roberts	Impulse!
May 21, 1963	Cleopatra Feelin' Jazzy	Paul Gonsalves	Impulse!
May 22, 1963	Swing Time!	Claude Hopkins	Swingville
May 23, 1963 & May 24, 1963	Grease 'n' Gravy	Willis Jackson	Prestige
May 23, 1963 & May 24, 1963	The Good Life	Willis Jackson	Prestige
May 27, 1963	Drag 'em Out	Shirley Scott	Prestige
May 27, 1963	Steppin' Out!	Harold Vick	Blue Note
June 3, 1963	Page One	Joe Henderson	Blue Note
June 4, 1963 & February 4, 1964	Today and Tomorrow	McCoy Tyner	Impulse!
June 4, 1963	Goin' Away	Lightnin' Hopkins	Bluesville
June 10, 1963	Now!	Sonny Stitt	Impulse!
June 13, 1963	The Eastern Moods of Ahmed Abdul-Malik	Ahmed Abdul-Malik	Prestige
June 19, 1963	Exultation!	Booker Ervin	Prestige
June 27, 1963	Gumbo!	Pony Poindexter with Booker Ervin	Prestige
July 1963	Any Number Can Win	Jimmy Smith	Verve
July 11, 1963 & August 2, 1963	Blue John	John Patton	Blue Note
July 16, 1963	A Jazz Message	Art Blakey Quartet	Impulse!
July 16, 1963 & July 17 and 20, 1963	Alarums & Excursions	Michael Brown Quartet	Impulse!
July 18, 1963 & August 9, 1963	Little Johnny C	Johnny Coles	Blue Note
July 29, 1963	Shoutin'	Don Wilkerson	Blue Note
August 8, 1963	Illumination!	Elvin Jones-Jimmy Garrison Sextet	Impulse!
August 13, 1963	Step Lightly	Blue Mitchell	Blue Note
August 20, 1963	Barefoot Sunday Blues	Ramsey Lewis Trio	Argo
August 27, 1963 & October 10, 1963	The Burner	Red Holloway	Prestige
August 30, 1963	Inventions & Dimensions	Herbie Hancock	Blue Note
September 4, 1963	Two Souls in One	George Braith	Blue Note
September 5, 1963	Salt and Pepper	Sonny Stitt	Impulse!
September 9, 1963	Our Thing	Joe Henderson	Blue Note
September 10, 1963	Cymbalism	Roy Haynes	New Jazz
September 17, 1963	Soul Shack	Sonny Stitt with Jack McDuff	Prestige
September 20, 1963	Destination... Out!	Jackie McLean	Blue Note
October 9, 1963 & October 17, 1963	I Just Dropped by to Say Hello	Johnny Hartman	Impulse!
October 14, 1963 & October 21, 1963	A Chip Off the Old Block	Stanley Turrentine	Blue Note
October 15, 1963	Soul Shoutin'	Shirley Scott with Stanley Turrentine	Prestige
October 19, 1963	Here's Love	Hank Jones	Argo
October 24, 1963	More Gravy	Willis Jackson	Prestige
October 31, 1963 & January 28 and October 26, 1964	Song for My Father	Horace Silver	Blue Note
November 4, 1963 & November 15, 1963	Idle Moments	Grant Green	Blue Note
November 5, 1963	Blues Around the Clock	Jimmy Witherspoon	Prestige
November 9, 1963	Black Fire	Andrew Hill	Blue Note
November 21, 1963	Evolution	Grachan Moncur III	Blue Note
November 29, 1963 & December 9, 1963	Good Move!	Freddie Roach	Blue Note
December 3, 1963	The Freedom Book	Booker Ervin	Prestige
December 3, 1963, June 30, 1964 & October 2, 1964	Groovin' High	Booker Ervin	Prestige
December 13, 1963	Smokestack	Andrew Hill	Blue Note
December 11, 1963	Man from Two Worlds	Chico Hamilton	Impulse!
December 16, 1963	Soul Stream	George Braith	Blue Note
December 17, 1963	Doin' the Thang!	Ronnie Mathews with Freddie Hubbard	Prestige
December 19, 1963 & December 20, 1963	Jazz 'Round the World	Yusef Lateef	Impulse!
December 21, 1963	The Sidewinder	Lee Morgan	Blue Note
December 29, 1963	The Kicker	Bobby Hutcherson	Blue Note
December 31, 1963	Primitivo Soul!	Sonny Stitt	Prestige
1964	Just Dave Van Ronk	Dave Van Ronk	Mercury
January 8, 1964	Judgment!	Andrew Hill	Blue Note
January 9, 1964	Boss Shoutin'	Willis Jackson	Prestige
January 16, 1964	Take It from Me	Terry Gibbs Quartet	Impulse!
January 20, 1964 & January 21 and 27, 1964	Who's Afraid of Virginia Woolf?	Jimmy Smith	Verve
January 24, 1964	Hustlin'	Stanley Turrentine	Blue Note
February 10, 1964	Free for All	Art Blakey and The Jazz Messengers	Blue Note
February 13, 1964	Desert Winds	Illinois Jacquet and Kenny Burrell	Argo
February 15, 1964	Search for the New Land	Lee Morgan	Blue Note
February 17, 1964	Travelin' Light	Shirley Scott and Kenny Burrell	Prestige
February 20, 1964	Blue Spoon	Jimmy Witherspoon	Prestige
February 25, 1964	Out to Lunch!	Eric Dolphy	Blue Note
February 27, 1964	The Song Book	Booker Ervin	Prestige
February 27, 1964	The Rocking Tenor Sax of Eddie Chamblee	Eddie Chamblee	Prestige
March 2, 1964	The Guitar & Banjo of Reverend Gary Davis	Reverend Gary Davis	Prestige Folklore
March 4, 1964	Nobody Else But Me	Stan Getz	Verve
March 11, 1964 & March 25, 1964	See You at the Fair	Ben Webster	Impulse!
March 12, 1964	Spellbound	Ahmed Abdul-Malik	Status
March 13, 1964	The Happy Horns of Clark Terry	Clark Terry	Impulse!
March 19, 1964	Brown Sugar	Freddie Roach	Blue Note
March 19, 1964	Shangri-La	Sonny Stitt with Don Patterson	Prestige
March 19, 1964, May 12, 1964 & July 10, 1964	Patterson's People	Don Patterson with Sonny Stitt and Booker Ervin	Prestige
March 21, 1964	Point of Departure	Andrew Hill	Blue Note
March 27, 1964	Extension	George Braith	Blue Note
March 31, 1964	Blue Flames	Shirley Scott and Stanley Turrentine	Prestige
April 7, 1964	Soul Call	Kenny Burrell	Prestige
April 10, 1964	In 'n Out	Joe Henderson	Blue Note
April 20, 1964 & September 29, 1964	Christmas '64	Jimmy Smith	Verve
April 24, 1964 & May 15, 1964	Indestructible	Art Blakey and The Jazz Messengers	Blue Note
April 27, 1964 & June 1, 1964	Crescent	John Coltrane	Impulse!
April 29, 1964	Night Dreamer	Wayne Shorter	Blue Note
May 4, 1964	Down Home Blues	Lightnin' Hopkins	Bluesville
May 4, 1964 & May 5, 1964	Soul Blues	Lightnin' Hopkins	Prestige
May 5, 1964 & May 6, 1964	Stan Getz & Bill Evans	Stan Getz and Bill Evans	Verve
May 7, 1964	Breaking Point!	Freddie Hubbard	Blue Note
May 12, 1964	The Exciting New Organ of Don Patterson	Don Patterson with Booker Ervin	Prestige
May 12, 1964 & July 10, 1964	Hip Cake Walk	Don Patterson with Booker Ervin	Prestige
May 20, 1964	Matador	Grant Green	Blue Note
May 21, 1964, May 28, 1964 & March 14, 1961	Out Front!	Jaki Byard	Prestige
June 3, 1964	In Memory Of	Stanley Turrentine	Blue Note
June 9, 1964 & June 10, 1964	New Fantasy	Lalo Schifrin	Verve
June 12, 1964	Solid	Grant Green	Blue Note
June 15, 1964, June 16, 1964, September 3, 1964 & October 7, 1964	Soft Samba	Gary McFarland	Verve
June 17, 1964	Empyrean Isles	Herbie Hancock	Blue Note
June 18, 1964	Little Barefoot Soul	Bobby Timmons	Prestige
June 18, 1964	Warm Wave	Cal Tjader	Verve
June 19, 1964	The Way I Feel	John Patton	Blue Note
June 25, 1964	Andrew!!!	Andrew Hill	Blue Note
June 30, 1964	The Blues Book	Booker Ervin	Prestige
July 6, 1964	Some Other Stuff	Grachan Moncur III	Blue Note
July 10, 1964, August 25, 1964 & June 2 and September 15, 1969	Tune Up!	Don Patterson	Prestige
July 30, 1964	The Thing to Do	Blue Mitchell	Blue Note
August 3, 1964	JuJu	Wayne Shorter	Blue Note
August 5, 1964	It's Time!	Jackie McLean	Blue Note
August 6, 1964 & August 7, 1964	Jazz 'n' Samba	Milt Jackson	Impulse!
August 10, 1964	Four for Trane	Archie Shepp	Impulse!
August 11, 1964	Tom Cat	Lee Morgan	Blue Note
August 12, 1964	Chun-King	Bobby Timmons	Prestige
August 14, 1964 & September 3, 1964	Preface	Morris Nanton Trio	Prestige
August 17, 1964 & August 20, 1964	How! Hear!	Andy and the Bey Sisters	Prestige
August 21, 1964 & August 24, 1964	Life Time	Tony Williams	Blue Note
August 25, 1964	Soul People	Sonny Stitt with Booker Ervin and Don Patterson	Prestige
September 4, 1964	Mr. Natural	Stanley Turrentine	Blue Note
September 10, 1964 & September 21, 1964	Jazz Orient-ed	Eddie Bonnemere	Prestige
September 11, 1964	Talkin' About!	Grant Green	Blue Note
September 14, 1964	Trompeta Toccata	Kenny Dorham	Blue Note
September 15, 1964	Lucky Strikes	Lucky Thompson	Prestige
September 16, 1964	Action Action Action	Jackie McLean	Blue Note
September 21, 1964 & September 23, 1964	Everybody Loves a Lover	Shirley Scott	Impulse!
September 22, 1964 & September 24, 1964	The Voice That Is!	Johnny Hartman	Impulse!
October 2, 1964	The Space Book	Booker Ervin	Prestige
October 6, 1964, November 2, 1964 & December 16, 1964	Up with Donald Byrd	Donald Byrd	Verve
October 8, 1964	Afro-Soul/Drum Orgy	A. K. Salim	Prestige
October 16, 1964	All That's Good	Freddie Roach	Blue Note
October 21, 1964	Workin' Out!	Bobby Timmons with Johnny Lytle	Prestige
October 23, 1964 & October 26–27, 1964	Out of Sight!	Pat Bowie	Prestige
October 28, 1964 & October 29, 1964	You Better Know It!!!	Lionel Hampton	Impulse!
November 10, 1964 & November 11, 1964	More Blues and the Abstract Truth	Oliver Nelson	Impulse!
November 12, 1964	Into Somethin'	Larry Young	Blue Note
November 13, 1964 & November 16 and 20, 1964	Happiness	The Russian Jazz Quartet	Impulse!
November 16, 1964	Street of Dreams	Grant Green	Blue Note
November 19, 1964 & November 23, 1964	Soul Sauce	Cal Tjader	Verve
November 20, 1964	Bebop Revisited!	Charles McPherson	Prestige
November 21, 1964	Wahoo!	Duke Pearson	Blue Note
November 24, 1964	Holiday Soul	Bobby Timmons	Prestige
November 25, 1964	Holiday Soul	Don Patterson	Prestige
November 30, 1964	Inner Urge	Joe Henderson	Blue Note
December 2, 1964	My Life in the Blues	Lightnin' Hopkins	Prestige
December 2, 1964 & December 7 and 8, 1964	McCoy Tyner Plays Ellington	McCoy Tyner	Impulse!
December 8, 1964	Morning Mist	Chuck Wayne	Prestige
December 9, 1964	A Love Supreme	John Coltrane	Impulse!
December 11, 1964	Fuchsia Swing Song	Sam Rivers	Blue Note
December 17, 1964 & December 18, 1964	I'm Tryin' to Get Home	Donald Byrd	Blue Note
December 24, 1964	Speak No Evil	Wayne Shorter	Blue Note
1965	The Two Sides of Benji Aronoff	Benji Aronoff	Prestige
January 6, 1965 & January 7, 1965	Joe's Blues	Johnny Hodges and Wild Bill Davis	Verve
January 13, 1965	Rip, Rig and Panic	Roland Kirk	Limelight
January 15, 1965 & January 17 and 19, 1965	Room for One More	Irene Reid	Verve
January 19, 1965 & January 20, 1965	Monster	Jimmy Smith	Verve
January 25, 1965 & February 16, 1965	Lonely Avenue	Freddie McCoy	Prestige
January 29, 1965	Right Now!	Jackie McLean	Blue Note
February 3, 1965	Trio '65	Bill Evans	Verve
February 5, 1965	Undiluted	Wynton Kelly	Verve
February 10, 1965	Pax	Andrew Hill	Blue Note
February 16, 1965	Lucky Thompson Plays Happy Days Are Here Again	Lucky Thompson	Prestige
February 16, 1965 & March 9, 1965	Fire Music	Archie Shepp	Impulse!
February 17, 1965, February 18, 1965 & May 17, 1965	The John Coltrane Quartet Plays	John Coltrane	Impulse!
February 19, 1965, February 26, 1965 & March 5, 1966	Blue Spirits	Freddie Hubbard	Blue Note
February 22, 1965 & March 1, 1965	Wrapped Tight	Coleman Hawkins	Impulse!
February 23, 1965 & February 25, 1965	Dear John C.	Elvin Jones	Impulse!
February 24, 1965	1984	Yusef Lateef	Impulse!
February 26, 1965 & May 27, 1965	'Round Midnight	Andy and the Bey Sisters	Prestige
March 4, 1965	The Soothsayer	Wayne Shorter	Blue Note
March 8, 1965	Oh Baby!	John Patton	Blue Note
March 8, 1965	Inspired Abandon	Lawrence Brown's All Stars with Johnny Hodges	Impulse!
March 9, 1965 & August 12, 1965	On This Night	Archie Shepp	Impulse!
March 16, 1965 & May 18–20, 1965	Bumpin'	Wes Montgomery	Verve
March 17, 1965	Maiden Voyage	Herbie Hancock	Blue Note
March 31, 1965	I Want to Hold Your Hand	Grant Green	Blue Note
April 3, 1965	Dialogue	Bobby Hutcherson	Blue Note
April 9, 1965 & April 21, 1965	The Rumproller	Lee Morgan	Blue Note
April 14, 1965	Joyride	Stanley Turrentine	Blue Note
May 7, 1965	The Stinger	Johnny "Hammond" Smith	Prestige
May 13, 1965	Soul Fingers	Morris Nanton	Prestige
May 13, 1965 & June 16, 1965	Something We've Got	Morris Nanton	Prestige
May 19, 1965	Basra	Pete La Roca	Blue Note
May 21, 1965	Contours	Sam Rivers	Blue Note
May 21, 1965 & May 23, 1965	Once a Thief and Other Themes	Lalo Schifrin	Verve
May 26, 1965	His Majesty King Funk	Grant Green	Verve
May 26, 1965 & June 10, 1965	Transition	John Coltrane	Impulse!
May 27, 1965	Clubhouse	Dexter Gordon	Blue Note
May 28, 1965 & May 29, 1965	Gettin' Around	Dexter Gordon	Blue Note
June 3, 1965	Musty Rusty	Lou Donaldson	Argo
June 8, 1965, August 30, 1965 & September 8, 1965	Spanish Grease	Willie Bobo	Verve
June 10, 1965 & June 16, 1965	Kulu Sé Mama	John Coltrane	Impulse!
June 10, 1965 & June 16, 1965	Living Space	John Coltrane	Impulse!
June 10, 1965	Components	Bobby Hutcherson	Blue Note
June 14, 1965	Et Cetera	Wayne Shorter	Blue Note
June 14, 1965 & June 15, 1965	Organ Grinder Swing	Jimmy Smith	Verve
June 18, 1965	Dippin'	Hank Mobley	Blue Note
June 22, 1965	Soul Bird: Whiffenpoof	Cal Tjader	Verve
June 25, 1965 & July 1, 1965	The Gigolo	Lee Morgan	Blue Note
June 28, 1965	Ascension	John Coltrane	Impulse!
July 8, 1965	Sonny Rollins on Impulse!	Sonny Rollins	Impulse!
July 12, 1965	Chicken & Dumplin's	Bobby Timmons	Prestige
July 14, 1965	Down With It!	Blue Mitchell	Blue Note
July 16, 1965	Mohawk	New York Art Quartet	Fontana
July 19, 1965	Satisfaction!	Don Patterson	Prestige
July 21, 1965 & July 22, 1965	Psychicemotus	Yusef Lateef	Impulse!
July 26, 1965 & July 27, 1965	Wings & Things	Johnny Hodges and Wild Bill Davis	Verve
August 2, 1965 & August 3, 1965	The In Sound	Gary McFarland	Verve
August 3, 1965	Soul Message	Richard "Groove" Holmes	Prestige
August 3, 1965, July 7, 1966 & August 12, 1966	Misty	Richard "Groove" Holmes	Prestige
August 4, 1965	Con Alma!	Charles McPherson	Prestige
August 11, 1965 & August 13, 1965	Sylvia Is!	Sylvia Syms with Kenny Burrell	Prestige
August 12, 1965	Spring	Tony Williams	Blue Note
September 1, 1965	Introducing Eric Kloss	Eric Kloss	Prestige
September 2, 1965	"In" Jazz for the Culture Set	Dannie Richmond	Impulse!
September 2, 1965	First Meditations (for quartet)	John Coltrane	Impulse!
September 7, 1965 & September 9, 1965	Feelin' Good!	Pat Bowie	Prestige
September 18, 1965	Cornbread	Lee Morgan	Blue Note
September 21, 1965	Night Crawler	Sonny Stitt with Don Patterson	Prestige
September 22, 1965	Smokin' at the Half Note	Wes Montgomery and Wynton Kelly	Verve
September 24, 1965 & April 18, 1966	Jacknife	Jackie McLean	Blue Note
October 1, 1965 & October 22, 1965	The Cape Verdean Blues	Horace Silver	Blue Note
October 6, 1965	Spider Man	Freddie McCoy	Prestige
October 8, 1965	Compulsion!!!!!	Andrew Hill	Blue Note
October 15, 1965	The All Seeing Eye	Wayne Shorter	Blue Note
October 28, 1965	Trip on the Strip	Stan Hunter and Sonny Fortune	Prestige
November 1965	Gypsy '66	Gábor Szabó	Impulse!
November 10, 1965	Unity	Larry Young	Blue Note
November 16, 1965	Infinity	Lee Morgan	Blue Note
November 20, 1965 & December 7, 8 and 22, 1965	Goin' Out of My Head	Wes Montgomery	Verve
November 22, 1965, December 6, 10 and 23, 1965 & February 4, 1966	Look to the Rainbow	Astrud Gilberto with Gil Evans	Verve
November 23, 1965	Meditations	John Coltrane	Impulse!
December 1965	In the Beginning	Woody Shaw	Muse
December 2, 1965	Fearless Frank Foster	Frank Foster	Prestige
December 3, 1965	Consequence	Jackie McLean	Blue Note
December 11, 1965	Let 'em Roll	John Patton	Blue Note
December 12, 1965 & December 21, 1965	Arthur Prysock and Count Basie	Arthur Prysock and the Count Basie Orchestra	Verve
December 16, 1965 & December 17, 1965	Got My Mojo Workin'	Jimmy Smith	Verve
December 18, 1965	A Caddy for Daddy	Hank Mobley	Blue Note
December 24, 1965	Complete Communion	Don Cherry	Blue Note
December 28, 1965	The Boss Men	Don Patterson with Sonny Stitt and Billy James	Prestige
1966	Boss Organ	Charlie Earland Trio	Choice
1966	Out of Sight and Sound	The Free Spirits	ABC
January 4, 1966	The Stinger Meets the Golden Thrush	Johnny "Hammond" Smith with Byrdie Green	Prestige
January 6, 1966	Bring It Home to Me	Blue Mitchell	Blue Note
January 14, 1966	Stride Right	Johnny Hodges and Earl "Fatha" Hines	Impulse!
January 17, 1966	Here Comes Earl "Fatha" Hines	Earl Hines	Contact
January 20, 1966	The Soul Man!	Bobby Timmons	Prestige
January 26, 1966	Alfie	Sonny Rollins	Impulse!
January 26, 1966 & April 25 and 26, 1966	Uno Dos Tres 1•2•3	Willie Bobo	Verve
January 27, 1966	Mode for Joe	Joe Henderson	Blue Note
February 3, 1966 & February 24, 1966	Adam's Apple	Wayne Shorter	Blue Note
February 6, 1966	Happenings	Bobby Hutcherson	Blue Note
February 9, 1966 & February 10 and 11 1966	Soul Burst	Cal Tjader	Verve
February 15, 1966	Tough!	Pucho & The Latin Soul Brothers	Prestige
February 22, 1966	Metamorphosis	Don Friedman	Prestige
February 25, 1966	Sole Forms	Brooks Arthur Ensemble	Verve
March 1, 1966	Laughing Soul	George Braith	Prestige
March 7, 1966	Change	Andrew Hill	Blue Note
March 8, 1966 & March 9, 1966	A Flat, G Flat and C	Yusef Lateef	Impulse!
March 14, 1966 & April 11, 1966	Love and All That Jazz	Eric Kloss	Prestige
March 15, 1966 & July 7, 1966	Soul Mist!	Richard "Groove" Holmes	Prestige
March 17, 1966 & March 21, 1966	Tequila	Wes Montgomery	Verve
March 18, 1966	A Slice of the Top	Hank Mobley	Blue Note
March 23, 1966 & March 25 and 30, 1966	More Brass	Kai Winding	Verve
April 6, 1966 & April 15, 1966	Let It Go	Stanley Turrentine	Impulse!
April 8, 1966 & May 27, 1966	Delightfulee	Lee Morgan	Blue Note
April 13, 1966 & April 14, 1966	Oliver Nelson Plays Michelle	Oliver Nelson	Impulse!
April 15, 1966 & April 19, 1966	Roll 'Em: Shirley Scott Plays the Big Bands	Shirley Scott	Impulse!
April 18, 1966 & April 19 and 20, 1966	Out of the Storm	Ed Thigpen	Verve
April 27, 1966 & April 28, 1966	The Dissection and Reconstruction of Music from the Past as Performed by the Inmates of Lalo Schifrin's Demented Ensemble as a Tribute to the Memory of the Marquis De Sade	Lalo Schifrin	Verve
April 29, 1966	Got a Good Thing Goin'	John Patton	Blue Note
May 2, 1966 & May 5, 1966	The Further Adventures of El Chico	Chico Hamilton	Impulse!
May 6, 1966	Spellbinder	Gábor Szabó	Impulse!
May 9, 1966	East Broadway Run Down	Sonny Rollins	Impulse!
May 10, 1966	Intermodulation	Bill Evans and Jim Hall	Verve
May 11, 1966 & May 12, 1966	Peter & the Wolf	Jimmy Smith	Verve
May 16, 1966 & May 17, 1966	Rain Forest	Walter Wanderley	Verve
May 18, 1966 & May 20, 1966	Simpático	Gary McFarland and Gábor Szabó	Impulse!
May 19, 1966	Unit Structures	Cecil Taylor	Blue Note
May 24, 1966 & May 25 and 26, 1966	El Sonido Nuevo	Cal Tjader and Eddie Palmieri	Verve
June 13, 1966 & June 28, 1966	The Freddie Roach Soul Book	Freddie Roach	Prestige
June 14, 1966	Hoochie Coochie Man	Jimmy Smith	Verve
June 15, 1966 & June 16, 1966	The Golden Flute	Yusef Lateef	Impulse!
June 16, 1966	Underground Soul!	Houston Person	Prestige
June 21, 1966 & June 22, 1966	Funk Drops	Freddie McCoy	Prestige
June 24, 1966	Mustang!	Donald Byrd	Blue Note
June 27, 1966 & July 11, 1966	Soul Outing!	Frank Foster	Prestige
July 1, 1966	Rough 'n' Tumble	Stanley Turrentine	Blue Note
July 8, 1966	Easy Walker	Stanley Turrentine	Blue Note
July 14, 1966	Stick-Up!	Bobby Hutcherson	Blue Note
July 28, 1966	Of Love and Peace	Larry Young	Blue Note
August 4, 1966 & August 17, 1966	Jazz Raga	Gábor Szabó	Impulse!
August 5, 1966	Soul Happening!	Don Patterson	Prestige
August 19, 1966	Mama Too Tight	Archie Shepp	Impulse!
September 8, 1966 & September 12, 1966	First Prize!	Eddie Daniels	Prestige
September 9, 1966	The Empty Foxhole	Ornette Coleman	Blue Note
September 14, 1966 & September 15 and 16, 1966	California Dreaming	Wes Montgomery	Verve
September 19, 1966	Symphony for Improvisers	Don Cherry	Blue Note
September 21, 1966 & September 23 and 28, 1966	Jimmy & Wes: The Dynamic Duo	Jimmy Smith and Wes Montgomery	Verve
September 21, 1966 & September 28, 1966	Further Adventures of Jimmy and Wes	Jimmy Smith and Wes Montgomery	Verve
September 22, 1966	The Spoiler	Stanley Turrentine	Blue Note
September 28, 1966	Love Potion #9	Johnny "Hammond" Smith	Prestige
September 29, 1966	Charisma	Lee Morgan	Blue Note
September 30, 1966 & October 14, 1966	Soul Food	Bobby Timmons	Prestige
October 4, 1966	A Simple Matter of Conviction	Bill Evans	Verve
October 6, 1966	Conquistador!	Cecil Taylor	Blue Note
October 11, 1966	A New Conception	Sam Rivers	Blue Note
October 21, 1966	This is Criss!	Sonny Criss	Prestige
October 25, 1966	Vibrations	The Three Sounds	Blue Note
October 27, 1966	Soft Samba Strings	Gary McFarland	Verve
November 2, 1966 & November 23, 1966	The Jody Grind	Horace Silver	Blue Note
November 3, 1964 & November 4, 1966	Encyclopedia of Jazz	Leonard Feather	Verve
November 3, 1964 & November 4, 1966	The Sound of Feeling	Leonard Feather presents Oliver Nelson	Verve
November 8, 1966 & November 9 and 10, 1966	Saffron and Soul	Pucho & the Latin Soul Brothers	Prestige
November 11, 1966	Where Is Brooklyn?	Don Cherry	Blue Note
November 15, 1966	The New Genius of the Blues	Billy Hawks	Prestige
November 15, 1966	Tauhid	Pharoah Sanders	Impulse!
November 17, 1966	Boss Horn	Blue Mitchell	Blue Note
November 21, 1966 & January 3, 1967	Musart	George Braith	Prestige
November 28, 1966	Spicy!	Richard "Groove" Holmes	Prestige
November 29, 1966	The Rajah	Lee Morgan	Blue Note
December 1966	The Deadly Affair	Quincy Jones	Verve
December 1, 1966	Three for Shepp	Marion Brown	Impulse!
December 2, 1966 & December 8, 1966	Voices	Stan Getz	Verve
December 2, 1966	What the World Needs Now: Stan Getz Plays Burt Bacharach and Hal David	Stan Getz	Verve
December 7, 1966	Sweet Honey Bee	Duke Pearson	Blue Note
December 9, 1966 & December 20, 1966	Lovesick	Jackie and Roy	Verve
December 13, 1966	Nothin' But the Truth!	Teddy Edwards	Prestige
December 16, 1966, December 20, 1966, January 31, 1967 & March 28, 1967	A Generation Ago Today	Kenny Burrell	Verve
December 21, 1966 & December 22, 1966	Grits & Gravy	Eric Kloss	Prestige
1967	Done It Again	Johnny Lytle	Pacific Jazz
January 5, 1967	Mocha Motion!	Freddie Roach	Prestige
January 9, 1967	Blackjack	Donald Byrd	Blue Note
January 13, 1967	Standards	Lee Morgan	Blue Note
January 20, 1967	Lush Life	Lou Donaldson	Blue Note
February 2, 1967, February 9 and 13, 1967 & March 2, 1967	Penny Lane & Time	Kai Winding	Verve
February 10, 1967, May 17 and October 31, 1967, June 13 and August 1, 1969 & January 16 and 23, 1970	Mosaic Select 16: Andrew Hill	Andrew Hill	Blue Note
February 15, 1967 & March 7, 1967	Expression	John Coltrane	Impulse!
February 15, 1967 & February 21, 1967	Introducing the Fabulous Trudy Pitts	Trudy Pitts	Prestige
February 15, 1967	Stellar Regions	John Coltrane	Impulse!
February 16, 1967	On the Spot!	Jaki Byard	Prestige
February 17, 1967 & June 9, 1967	A Bluish Bag	Stanley Turrentine	Blue Note
February 22, 1967	Interstellar Space	John Coltrane	Impulse!
February 23, 1967	Electric Soul!	Buddy Terry	Prestige
February 24, 1967	Third Season	Hank Mobley	Blue Note
March 3, 1967	Gettin' Up	Johnny "Hammond" Smith	Prestige
March 7, 1967	A Monastic Trio	Alice Coltrane	Impulse!
March 9, 1967 & April 18, 1967	For Once in My Life	Sylvia Syms	Prestige
March 10, 1967	Schizophrenia	Wayne Shorter	Blue Note
March 15, 1967 & December 12, 1967	Introducing the Psychedelic Soul Jazz Guitar of Joe Jones	Joe Jones	Prestige
March 17, 1967	Dimensions & Extensions	Sam Rivers	Blue Note
March 21, 1967 & March 30, 1967	Sweet Rain	Stan Getz	Verve
March 23, 1967	Portrait of Sonny Criss	Sonny Criss	Prestige
March 24, 1967	New and Old Gospel	Jackie McLean	Blue Note
April 7, 1967	Alligator Bogaloo	Lou Donaldson	Blue Note
April 10, 1967, May 4, 1967 & October 6, 1965	Peas 'n' Rice	Freddie McCoy	Prestige
April 14, 1967 & April 28, 1967	Sonic Boom	Lee Morgan	Blue Note
April 20, 1967	I Got It Bad (And That Ain't Good)	Byrdie Green	Prestige
April 21, 1967	The Real McCoy	McCoy Tyner	Blue Note
April 26, 1967	The Magic of Ju-Ju	Archie Shepp	Impulse!
May 1, 1967	El Hombre	Pat Martino	Prestige
May 2, 1967	Now Please Don't You Cry, Beautiful Edith	Roland Kirk	Verve
May 10, 1967	Mellow Soul	Don Patterson	Prestige
May 12, 1967	Slow Drag	Donald Byrd	Blue Note
May 22, 1967, May 23 and 24, 1967 & June 15, 1967	Wave	Antônio Carlos Jobim	CTI
May 26, 1967	Far Away Lands	Hank Mobley	Blue Note
May 28, 1967 & May 29, 1966	Along Comes Cal	Cal Tjader	Verve
May 29, 1967	Get Up & Get It!	Richard "Groove" Holmes	Prestige
June 2, 1967 & June 14, 1964	Respect	Jimmy Smith	Verve
June 6, 1967 & June 26, 1967	A Day in the Life	Wes Montgomery	CTI
June 22, 1967 & June 29, 1967	My People (Soul People)	Freddie Roach	Prestige
June 23, 1967 & July 28, 1967	The Return of the Prodigal Son	Stanley Turrentine	Blue Note
July 14, 1967, September 12, 1969 & October 10, 1969	The Procrastinator	Lee Morgan	Blue Note
July 19, 1967	Blues & Things	Earl Hines and Jimmy Rushing	Master Jazz Recordings
July 21, 1967	Oblique	Bobby Hutcherson	Blue Note
July 26, 1967, July 27, 1967, September 19 and 20, 1967 & October 6, 1967	Glory of Love	Herbie Mann	CTI
July 27, 1967	Bobo Motion	Willie Bobo	Verve
August 25, 1967	Four Dimensions	Don Patterson	Prestige
September 5, 1967 & September 6, 7, 11, 12 and 14, 1967	We and the Sea	Tamba 4	CTI
September 8, 1967	'Bout Soul	Jackie McLean	Blue Note
September 13, 1967	The Right Touch	Duke Pearson	Blue Note
September 18, 1967	Contrasts	Larry Young	Blue Note
September 21, 1967 & September 25, 1967	These Blues of Mine	Trudy Pitts	Prestige
September 22, 1967	Easterly Winds	Jack Wilson	Blue Note
September 27, 1967	Soul Flowers	Johnny "Hammond" Smith	Prestige
October 2, 1967	Strings!	Pat Martino	Prestige
October 2, 1967 & October 4, 1967	Beans & Greens	Freddie McCoy	Prestige
October 5, 1967	The Creeper	Donald Byrd	Blue Note
October 9, 1967	Hi Voltage	Hank Mobley	Blue Note
October 20, 1967 & October 25, 1967	Soul Grabber	Willis Jackson	Prestige
October 27, 1967	Mr. Shing-A-Ling	Lou Donaldson	Blue Note
November 10, 1967 & September 13, 1968	The Sixth Sense	Lee Morgan	Blue Note
November 15, 1967	Natural Soul	Buddy Terry	Prestige
November 17, 1967	Heads Up!	Blue Mitchell	Blue Note
December 1, 1967	Tender Moments	McCoy Tyner	Blue Note
December 6, 1967	Heavy Soul!	Billy Hawks	Prestige
December 8, 1967	Groove Merchant	Jerome Richardson	Verve
December 15, 1967	Introducing Duke Pearson's Big Band	Duke Pearson	Blue Note
December 19, 1967	Soul Power!	Richard "Groove" Holmes	Prestige
December 20, 1967, December 21, 1967 & January 22 and 26, 1968	Down Here on the Ground	Wes Montgomery	CTI
December 20, 1967 & February 8, 1968	A Bucketful of Soul	Trudy Pitts	Prestige
December 22, 1967	Demon's Dance	Jackie McLean	Blue Note
December 29, 1967	Natural Essence	Tyrone Washington	Blue Note
January 8, 1968, January 15 and 17, 1968 & February 28, 1968	Have You Met Miss Jones?	Artie Butler	CTI
January 12, 1968	The In Between	Booker Ervin	Blue Note
January 19, 1968	Reach Out!	Hank Mobley	Blue Note
January 24, 1968 & February 5, 1968	Soul Yogi	Freddie McCoy	Prestige
January 31, 1968	Dirty Grape	Johnny "Hammond" Smith	Prestige
February 5, 1968 & February 7, 1968	Soul Guru	Wally Richardson	Prestige
February 9, 1968	Heaven on Earth	Larry Young	Blue Note
February 14, 1968	The Groover!	Richard "Groove" Holmes	Prestige
February 15, 1968	Taru	Lee Morgan	Blue Note
February 19, 1968, March 4 and 12 & April 16, 1968	Israel	Kai Winding and J. J. Johnson	CTI
February 21, 1968, February 22, 1968 & March 13 and 18, 1968	Trust In Me	Soul Flutes	CTI
February 23, 1968 & March 29, 1968	Serenade to a Soul Sister	Horace Silver	Blue Note
March 6, 1968 & March 9, 1968	Speak Like a Child	Herbie Hancock	Blue Note
March 8, 1968	That Certain Feeling	John Patton	Blue Note
March 11, 1968	A Few Miles from Memphis	Harold Mabern	Prestige
March 13, 1968, March 19, 1968, May 14, 1968 & June 12, 1968	Soul Machine	Richard Barbary	CTI
March 14, 1968	Patterns	Bobby Hutcherson	Blue Note
March 15, 1968	Midnight Creeper	Lou Donaldson	Blue Note
March 21, 1968	Manhattan Fever	Frank Foster	Blue Note
March 22, 1968	Star Bag	Willis Jackson	Prestige
March 26, 1968, March 27 and 28, 1968 & April 4, 1968	You, Baby	Nat Adderley	CTI
April 8, 1968	Puttin' It Together	Elvin Jones Trio	Blue Note
April 15, 1968, & May 2, 13 and 27, 1968	The Look of Love	Stanley Turrentine	Blue Note
May 3, 1968	¡Caramba!	Lee Morgan	Blue Note
May 7, 1968 & May 8 and 9, 1968	Road Song	Wes Montgomery	CTI
May 17, 1968	Time for Tyner	McCoy Tyner	Blue Note
May 24, 1968	Tex Book Tenor	Booker Ervin	Prestige
June 10, 1968	Listen Here	Freddie McCoy	Prestige
June 18, 1968	Nasty!	Johnny "Hammond" Smith	Prestige
June 24, 1968 & September 11, 1968	The Phantom	Duke Pearson	Blue Note
June 24, 1968, May 5, October 3 and November 21, 1969 & February 13, 1970	I Don't Care Who Knows It	Duke Pearson	Blue Note
July 23, 1968	Think!	Lonnie Smith	Blue Note
August 5, 1968 & April 19, 1968	Grass Roots	Andrew Hill	Blue Note
August 7, 1968 & August 8 and 13, 1968	Samba Blim	Tamba 4	CTI
August 9, 1968	Boogaloo	John Patton	Blue Note
August 15, 1968, August 29, 1968 & September 17, 1968	I'll Be Anything for You	Tamiko Jones	CTI
August 23, 1968	Expansions	McCoy Tyner	Blue Note
August 26, 1968	That Healin' Feelin'	Richard "Groove" Holmes	Prestige
August 27, 1968, September 5, 1968, October 5, 1968 & October 22, 1968	Shape of Things to Come	George Benson	CTI
August 30, 1968	Common Touch	Stanley Turrentine	Blue Note
September 6, 1968	The Ultimate	Elvin Jones	Blue Note
September 9, 1968	Swivelhips	Willis Jackson	Prestige
September 20, 1968	Ghetto Music	Eddie Gale	Blue Note
September 23, 1968	Soul Electricity!	Sonny Stitt	Prestige
October 4, 1968	On Broadway	Reuben Wilson	Blue Note
October 10, 1968, October 16 and 24, 1968, November 5 and 20, 1968 & December 26, 1968	Summertime	Paul Desmond	CTI
October 11, 1968	Dance with Death	Andrew Hill	Blue Note
October 21, 1968	My Fire!	Joe Jones	Prestige
October 22, 1968, October 29, 1968, November 15 and 26, December 5, 1968 & January 9, 1969	Betwixt & Between	Kai Winding and J. J. Johnson	CTI
October 24, 1968	Understanding	John Patton	Blue Note
November 6, 1968	Say It Loud!	Lou Donaldson	Blue Note
November 11, 1968	Spiral	Bobby Hutcherson	Blue Note
November 11, 1968	Gator's Groove	Willis Jackson	Prestige
November 18, 1968	Soul Dance!	Houston Person	Prestige
November 19, 1968, November 21 & December 4, 1968	Calling Out Loud	Nat Adderley	CTI
November 22, 1968, April 4, 1969 & July 21, 1970	Cosmos	McCoy Tyner	Blue Note
December 3, 1968	Now Hear This	Duke Pearson	Blue Note
December 11, 1968 & December 12 and 13, 1968	When It Was Done	Walter Wanderley	CTI
December 16, 1968	This Is Billy Butler!	Billy Butler	Prestige
December 19, 1968 & February 26 and 27, 1969	Courage	Milton Nascimento	CTI
December 23, 1968	Rakin' and Scrapin'	Harold Mabern	Prestige
1969	Soul Crib	Charlie Earland Trio featuring George Coleman	Choice
1969	Oklahoma Toad	Dave Frishberg	CTI
January 3, 1969	Turning Point	Lonnie Smith	Blue Note
January 10, 1969 & January 17, 1969	You Gotta Take a Little Love	Horace Silver	Blue Note
January 24, 1969 & February 3, 1969	Score	Randy Brecker	Solid State Records
February 7, 1969	Mother Ship	Larry Young	Blue Note
February 17, 1969	Rusty Bryant Returns	Rusty Bryant	Prestige
February 25, 1969 & August 19, 1969	Merry Ole Soul	Duke Pearson	Blue Note
March 3, 1969	Another Story	Stanley Turrentine	Blue Note
March 10, 1969	The Soul Brotherhood	Charles Kynard	Prestige
March 11, 1969 & March 12 and 13, 1969	Moondreams	Walter Wanderley	CTI
March 14, 1969	The Prime Element	Elvin Jones	Blue Note
March 21, 1969	Love Bug	Reuben Wilson	Blue Note
March 25, 1969	The Soul Explosion	Illinois Jacquet	Prestige
April 11, 1969, April 14, 1969 & May 5, 1969	How Insensitive	Duke Pearson	Blue Note
April 18, 1969, April 21 & 23, 1969	The Prisoner	Herbie Hancock	Blue Note
April 25, 1969	Hot Dog	Lou Donaldson	Blue Note
April 29, 1969 & May 16 and 20, 1969	Tell It Like It Is	George Benson	CTI
April 30, 1969, May 20, June 4, August 19 and 20 & September 3, 1969	I Got a Woman and Some Blues	George Benson	CTI
May 2, 1969	Black Rhythm Happening	Eddie Gale	Blue Note
May 9, 1969 & June 6, 1969	Fancy Free	Donald Byrd	Blue Note
May 16, 1969	Lift Every Voice	Andrew Hill	Blue Note
May 19, 1969	Soul Talk	Johnny "Hammond" Smith	Prestige
June 2, 1969	Oh Happy Day	Don Patterson	Prestige
June 9, 1969 & October 2, 1970	Memphis to New York Spirit	John Patton	Blue Note
June 18, 1969 & June 19, 1969	Walking in Space	Quincy Jones	CTI
June 23, 1969 & May 10, 1968	Ain't No Way	Stanley Turrentine	Blue Note
June 24, 1969, June 25, 1969 & August 13 and 14, 1969	From the Hot Afternoon	Paul Desmond	CTI
June 30, 1969	Workin' & Wailin'	Harold Mabern	Prestige
August 1, 1969 & January 16 and 23, 1970	One for One	Andrew Hill	Blue Note
August 4, 1969	Boogaloo Joe	Boogaloo Joe Jones	Prestige
August 11, 1969	Medina	Bobby Hutcherson	Blue Note
August 15, 1969	Accent on the Blues	John Patton	Blue Note
August 22, 1969 & January 9, 1970	Everything I Play Is Funky	Lou Donaldson	Blue Note
August 25, 1969	Goodness!	Houston Person	Prestige
September 15, 1969	Brothers-4	Don Patterson with Sonny Stitt	Prestige
September 15, 1969	Donny Brook	Don Patterson with Sonny Stitt	Prestige
September 16, 1969	The Blues; That's Me!	Illinois Jacquet	Prestige
September 22, 1969	Guitar Soul!	Billy Butler	Prestige
September 23, 1969 & September 24 and 25, 1969	Stonebone	Kai Winding and J. J. Johnson	CTI
September 23, 1969 & September 24, 1969	Crying Song	Hubert Laws	CTI
September 26, 1969	Poly-Currents	Elvin Jones	Blue Note
October 1969-December, 1969	Fat Albert Rotunda	Herbie Hancock	Warner Bros.
October 3, 1969	Carryin' On	Grant Green	Blue Note
October 6, 1969	Night Train Now!	Rusty Bryant	Prestige
October 20, 1969	Sure 'Nuff	Sonny Phillips	Prestige
October 22, 1969, October 23, 1969 & November 4 and 5, 1969	The Other Side of Abbey Road	George Benson	CTI
October 27, 1969	Night Letter	Sonny Stitt	Prestige
November 7, 1969 & November 14, 1969	Passing Ships	Andrew Hill	Blue Note
November 10, 1969 & November 11, 1969	The Boss Is Back!	Gene Ammons	Prestige
November 10, 1969 & November 11, 1969	Brother Jug!	Gene Ammons	Prestige
November 18, 1969, November 19, 20 and 24 & December 2, 1969	Kathy McCord	Kathy McCord	CTI
December 12, 1969	Blue Mode	Reuben Wilson	Blue Note
December 15, 1969	Black Talk!	Charles Earland	Prestige
December 17, 1969, December 18, 1969 & January 20 and 22, 1970	Flow	Flow	CTI
December 22, 1969	Black Feeling!	Johnny "Hammond" Smith	Prestige
