= Stanley Turrentine discography =

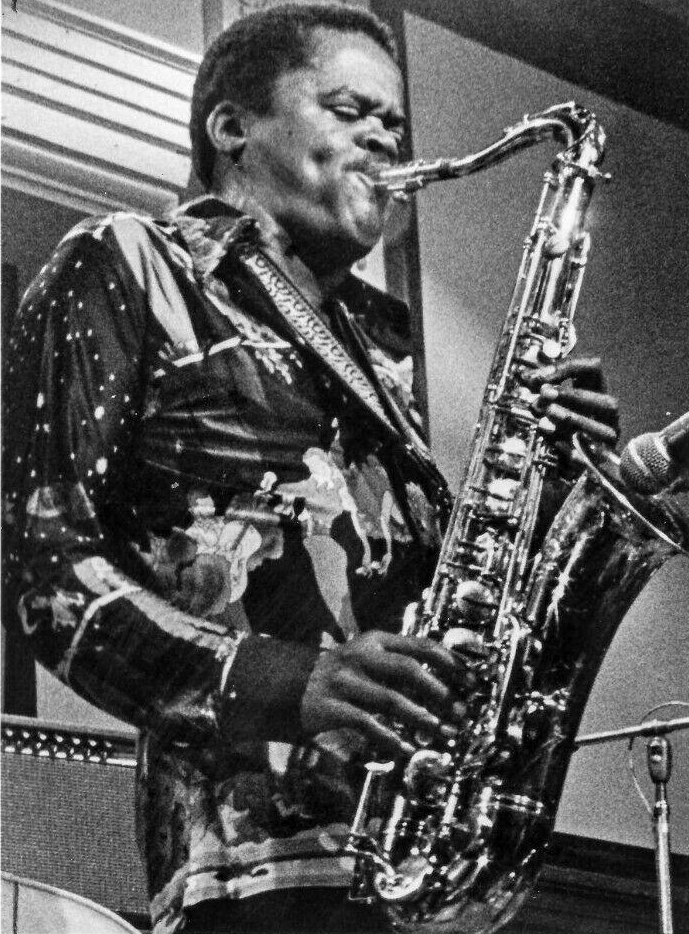
- Turrentine in 1976
- Studio albums: 44
- Live albums: 4
- Compilation albums: 11

This article presents the discography of the American jazz saxophonist and producer Stanley Turrentine (1934–2000).

== Discography ==
=== Studio albums ===
Year	Title	Label	Notes
1960	Look Out!	Blue Note	
1960	Blue Hour	Blue Note	with the 3 Sounds
1961	Comin' Your Way	Blue Note	
1961	Dearly Beloved	Blue Note	
1962	That's Where It's At	Blue Note	
1963	Never Let Me Go	Blue Note	
1963	A Chip off the Old Block	Blue Note	
1963	Stan "The Man" Turrentine	Time	a.k.a. Tiger Tail; debut recording as leader
1964	Hustlin'	Blue Note	
1965	Joyride	Blue Note	
1966	Rough 'n' Tumble	Blue Note	
1967	The Spoiler	Blue Note	
1967	Let It Go	Impulse!	
1968	Easy Walker	Blue Note	
1968	The Look of Love	Blue Note	
1968	Common Touch	Blue Note	featuring Shirley Scott
1968	Always Something There	Blue Note	
1969	Another Story	Blue Note	
1970	Flipped – Flipped Out	Canyon	
1970	Sugar	CTI	
1971	Gilberto with Turrentine	CTI	with Astrud Gilberto
1971	Salt Song	CTI	
1972	Cherry	CTI	with Milt Jackson
1973	Don't Mess with Mister T.	CTI	
1974	Pieces of Dreams	CTI	
1975	The Sugar Man	Fantasy	
1975	In the Pocket	Fantasy	
1975	Have You Ever Seen the Rain	Fantasy	
1976	Everybody Come On Out	Fantasy	
1976	The Man with the Sad Face	Fantasy	
1977	Nightwings	Fantasy	
1978	West Side Highway	Fantasy	
1978	What About You!	Fantasy	
1979	Betcha	Elektra	
1980	Inflation	Elektra	
1981	Tender Togetherness	Elektra	
1982	Home Again	Elektra	
1985	Straight Ahead	Blue Note	
1987	Wonderland (Stanley Turrentine Plays the Music of Stevie Wonder)	Blue Note	
1989	La Place	Blue Note	
1992	More than a Mood	MusicMasters	
1993	If I Could	MusicMasters	
1995	T Time	MusicMasters	
1999	Do You Have Any Sugar?	Concord Vista	

=== Live albums ===
Year	Title	Label	Notes
1961	Up at "Minton's", Volume 1	Blue Note	
1961	Up at "Minton's", Volume 2	Blue Note	
1974	Freddie Hubbard/Stanley Turrentine in Concert Volume One	CTI	with Freddie Hubbard
1974	In Concert Volume Two	CTI	with Herbie Hancock Freddie Hubbard

=== Compilation albums ===
Year	Title	Label	Notes
1975	Stanley Turrentine	Blue Note	2×LP
1977	Love's Finally Found Me	Versatile	with Gloria Lynne
1979	New Time Shuffle	Blue Note	archival album; recorded 1967-02-17, -06-23
1980	In Memory Of	Blue Note	archival album; recorded 1964
1980	Mr. Natural	Blue Note	archival album; recorded 1964
1980	Ain't No Way	Blue Note	archival album; recorded 1968 – 69
1985	ZT's Blues	Blue Note	archival album; recorded 1961
1986	Jubilee Shout!!!	Blue Note	2×LP; archival album; recorded 1962
1993	Ballads	Blue Note	
Posthumous albums
2007	A Bluish Bag	Blue Note	posthumous archival album; recorded 1967
2008	The Return of the Prodigal Son	Blue Note	posthumous archival album; recorded 1967

=== As sideman ===
With Shirley Scott

- 1961: Hip Soul (Prestige, 1961)
- 1961: Hip Twist (Prestige, 1962)
- 1963: The Soul Is Willing (Prestige, 1963)
- 1963: Soul Shoutin' (Prestige, 1964)
- 1964: Blue Flames (Prestige, 1964)
- 1964: Everybody Loves a Lover (Impulse!, 1964)
- 1964: Queen of the Organ (Impulse!, 1965) – live
- 1968: Soul Song (Atlantic, 1969)
- 1978: The Great Live Sessions (ABC/Impulse!, 1964)[2LP]

With Kenny Burrell

- 1963: Midnight Blue (Blue Note, 1963)
- 1963–64: Freedom (Blue Note, 1980)

With Donald Byrd

- 1964: Up with Donald Byrd (Verve, 1965)
- 1964: I'm Tryin' to Get Home (Blue Note, 1965)

With Gene Harris

- 1985: Gene Harris Trio Plus One (Concord, 1986)
- 1995: Gene Harris & the Philip Morris All-Stars: Live (Concord, 1998)

With Abbey Lincoln

- 1959: Abbey Is Blue (Riverside, 1959)
- 1992: Devil's Got Your Tongue (Verve, 1992)

With Horace Parlan

- 1960: Speakin' My Piece (Blue Note, 1960)
- 1961: On the Spur of the Moment (Blue Note, 1961)

With Max Roach

- 1959: Quiet as It's Kept (Mercury, 1960)
- 1959: Moon Faced and Starry Eyed (Mercury, 1959)
- 1960: Long as You're Living (Enja, 1984) – live
- 1960: Parisian Sketches (Mercury, 1960)

With Jimmy Smith

- 1960: Midnight Special (Blue Note, 1961)
- 1960: Back at the Chicken Shack (Blue Note, 1963)
- 1963: Prayer Meetin' (Blue Note, 1964)
- 1968?: Stay Loose (Verve, 1968)
- 1982: Off the Top (Elektra/Musician, 1982)
- 1985?: Go For Watcha Know (Blue Note, 1985)
- 1990: Fourmost (Milestone, 1991) – live
- 1990: Fourmost Return (Milestone, 2001) – live

With others

- Georgie Fame, The Blues and Me (Go Jazz, 1996)
- Roy Hargrove, With the Tenors of Our Time (Verve, 1993)
- Freddie Hubbard, Life Flight (Blue Note, 1983)
- Duke Jordan, Flight to Jordan (Blue Note, 1960)
- Diana Krall, Only Trust Your Heart (GRP, 1994)
- Les McCann, Les McCann Ltd. in New York (Pacific Jazz, 1961) – live
- Jimmy McGriff, Electric Funk (Blue Note, 1969)
- David "Fathead" Newman, Fire! Live at the Village Vanguard (Atlantic, 1988) – live
- New York Funkies, Hip Hop Bop! with Reuben Wilson (Meldac [jp], 1995)
- Duke Pearson, The Right Touch (Blue Note, 1968) – rec. 1967
- Ike Quebec, Easy Living (Blue Note, 1962) – some material previously released as Congo Lament
- Dizzy Reece, Comin' On! (Blue Note, 1999) – rec. 1960
- Mongo Santamaria, Mongo's Way (Atlantic, 1970)
- Marlena Shaw, Elemental Soul (Concord, 1997)
- Horace Silver, Serenade to a Soul Sister (Blue Note, 1968)
- Art Taylor, A.T.'s Delight (Blue Note, 1960)
- Tommy Turrentine, Tommy Turrentine (Time, 1960)
