= Butch Warren =

American jazz bassist (1939–2013)

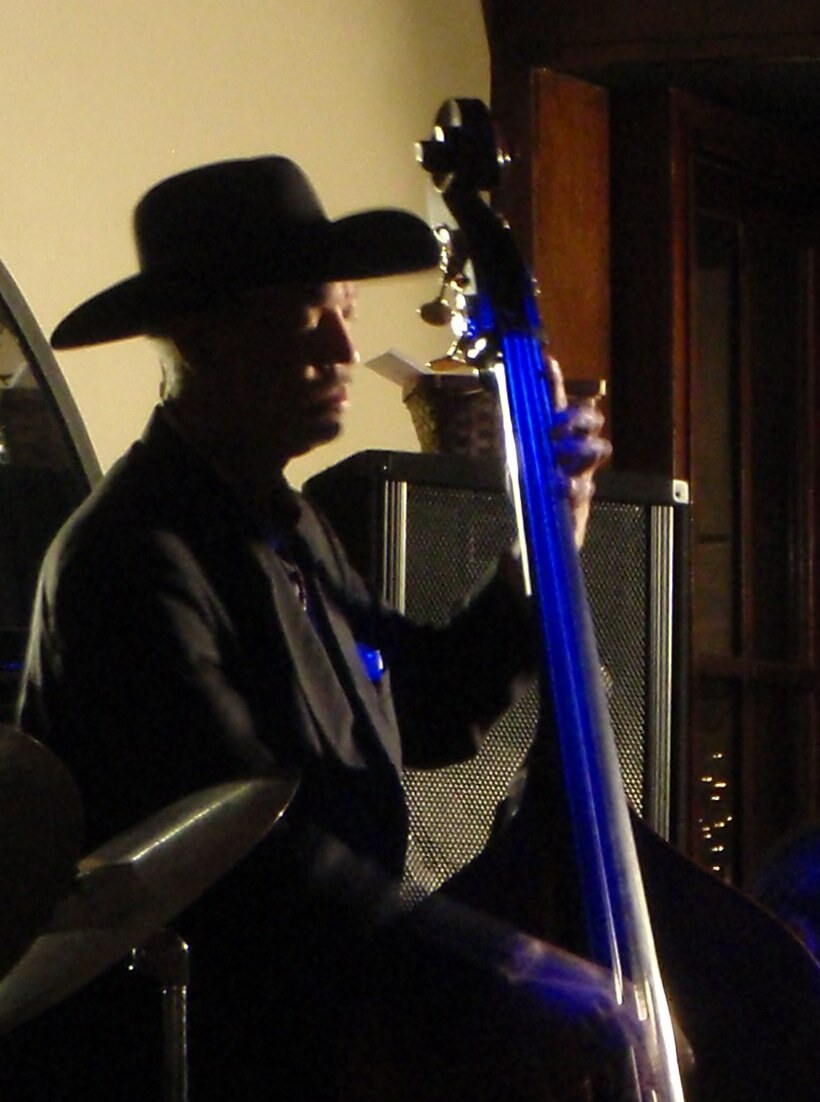
- Butch Warren in 2009

Background information
- Born: Edward Rudolph Warren Jr. August 9, 1939; Washington, D.C., U.S.
- Died: October 5, 2013 (aged 74) Silver Spring, Maryland
- Genres: Jazz
- Occupation: Musician
- Instrument: Double bass
- Years active: 1953–2013
- Label: Blue Note

Edward Rudolph "Butch" Warren Jr. (August 9, 1939 – October 5, 2013) was an American jazz bassist who was active during the 1950s and 1960s.

== Biography ==
Warren's mother was a typist at the CIA. His father, Edward Sr., was an electronics technician who played piano and organ part-time in clubs in Washington, D.C; his uncle, Quentin — actually the same age as Butch — played guitar. The Warren home was often visited by jazz musicians Billy Hart, Jimmy Smith, and Stuff Smith. The first time Butch Warren played bass was at home on an instrument left by Billy Taylor, who had played bass for Duke Ellington. Warren cited Jimmy Blanton, the innovative and virtuoso bassist with Ellington from 1939 to 1941, as his biggest inspiration.

Warren began playing professionally at age 14 in a Washington, D.C. band led by his father. He later worked with other local groups, including that of Stuff Smith, as well as with altoist and bandleader Rick Henderson at the Howard Theatre.

When he was 19, he sat in with Kenny Dorham to substitute for an absent bassist. A few days later, Dorham invited him to New York City, where he spent the next six months as a sideman at a club in Brooklyn. He appeared on his first recording in January 1960 with Dorham, saxophonist Charles Davis, pianist Tommy Flanagan, and drummer Buddy Enlow. Through his friendship with Sonny Clark, he recorded for Blue Note Records in 1961 on Clark's album Leapin' and Lopin'. Alfred Lion, producer at Blue Note, hired Warren to fill the vacancy of staff bassist. During this job he played on "Watermelon Man" with Herbie Hancock. As sideman, he also recorded with Miles Davis, Hank Mobley, Donald Byrd, Dexter Gordon, Joe Henderson, Jackie McLean, and Stanley Turrentine.

Mental illness and heroin addiction created problems for Warren. In 1963, his friend Sonny Clark died of an overdose. Months later, Thelonious Monk hired the 23-year-old Warren. Monk's band was surrounded by drugs and Warren quit after a yearlong tour. Moving back to D.C., he admitted himself to St. Elizabeths Hospital. He was diagnosed with paranoid schizophrenia.

Following the onset of his illness he played professionally only occasionally, including a regular gig at the jazz club Columbia Station in Washington D.C.

His only solo effort was captured on "Butch's Blues" but he was better known as a sideman on many albums, including Dexter Gordon's Go.

He died of lung cancer in Silver Spring, Maryland at the age of 74.

== Discography ==
=== As leader ===
- 2011: Butch Warren French Quintet - with Pierrick Menuau (saxophone), Pierre Christophe (piano), Mourad Benhammou (drums) and Jean Philippe Bordier (guitar)
- 2021: Butch Warren & Freddie Redd: Baltimore Jazz Loft- with Matt Wilson (drums) and Brad Linde (tenor saxophone) Bleebop Records (recorded 2013)

=== As sideman ===
With Donald Byrd

- 1961: Royal Flush
- 1961: Free Form
- 1963: A New Perspective

With Kenny Dorham

- 1960: The Kenny Dorham Memorial Album
- 1960: Jazz Contemporary
- 1963: Una Mas

With Dexter Gordon

- 1962: Go
- 1962: A Swingin' Affair

With Jackie McLean

- 1959: Vertigo
- 1961: A Fickle Sonance
- 1962: Tippin' the Scales
- 1967: Hipnosis

With Hank Mobley

- 1963: No Room for Squares
- 1963: The Turnaround
- 1963: Straight No Filter

With Thelonious Monk

- 1963: Miles & Monk at Newport
- 1963: Big Band and Quartet in Concert
- 1963: Monk in Tokyo
- 1964: It's Monk's Time

With others

- 1961: Leapin' and Lopin' – Sonny Clark
- 1961: High Hope! – Elmo Hope
- 1962: Takin' Off – Herbie Hancock
- 1962: Preach Brother! – Don Wilkerson
- 1962: Jubilee Shout!!! – Stanley Turrentine
- 1962: Feelin' the Spirit – Grant Green
- 1962: Exodus – Slide Hampton
- 1963: Happy Frame of Mind – Horace Parlan
- 1963: Exultation! – Booker Ervin
- 1963: Page One – Joe Henderson
- 1964: Holiday Soul – Bobby Timmons
- 1965: The Walter Bishop Jr. Trio / 1965 – Walter Bishop, Jr.
