= Rich Versus Roach =

Rich versus Roach

Studio album by Buddy Rich and Max Roach
- Released: 1959
- Recorded: April 7–8, 1959
- Genre: Jazz
- Length: 32:58
- Label: Mercury
- Producer: Jack Tracy

Buddy Rich chronology
Richcraft (1959)	Rich versus Roach (1959)	The Voice is Rich (1959)

Max Roach chronology
The Many Sides of Max (1959)	Rich versus Roach (1959)	Quiet as It's Kept (1959)

Professional ratings
Review scores
Source	Rating
Allmusic	3/5 stars
Tom Hull	B+

Rich versus Roach is a 1959 studio album by drummers Buddy Rich and Max Roach with their respective bands of the time. The album is mixed with each of the two bands in a different stereo channel. The Buddy Rich Quintet can be heard on the left channel, the Max Roach Quintet on the right.

== Track listing ==
LP side A

1. "Sing, Sing, Sing (With a Swing)" (Louis Prima) – 4:06
2. "The Casbah" (Gigi Gryce) – 4:25
3. "Sleep" (Earl Burtnett, Adam Geibel) – 3:15
4. "Figure Eights" (Buddy Rich, Max Roach) – 4:26

LP side B

1. "Yesterdays" (Otto Harbach, Jerome Kern) – 4:15
2. "Big Foot" (Charlie Parker) – 4:59
3. "Limehouse Blues" (Philip Braham, Douglas Furber) – 3:42
4. "Toot, Toot, Tootsie, Goodbye" (Ernie Erdman, Ted Fio Rito, Gus Kahn, Robert A. K. King) – 3:50

1986 CD re-issue with alternate versions:

1. "Sing, Sing, Sing (With a Swing)" (alt. take) – 4:22
2. "Sing, Sing, Sing (With a Swing)" – 4:08
3. "The Casbah" – 4:28
4. "The Casbah" (alt. take) – 4:58
5. "Sleep" – 3:18
6. "Figure Eights" – 4:30
7. "Yesterdays" – 5:41
8. "Big Foot" – 5:00
9. "Big Foot" (alt. take) – 5:14
10. "Limehouse Blues" – 3:56
11. "Limehouse Blues" (alt. take) – 3:43
12. "Toot, Toot, Tootsie, Goodbye" – 3:57

== Personnel ==
Rich's band

- Buddy Rich – drums, percussion
- Phil Woods – alto saxophone
- Willie Dennis – trombone
- Phil Leshin – double bass
- John Bunch – piano

Roach's band

- Max Roach – drums
- Stanley Turrentine – tenor saxophone
- Julian Priester – trombone
- Tommy Turrentine – trumpet
- Bobby Boswell – double bass

Production

- Jack Tracy – producer, liner notes
- Gigi Gryce – arranger
- Bill Stoddard – engineer
- Kiyoshi "Boxman" Koyama – compilation, research
