= Tommy Turrentine =

American jazz trumpeter and composer (1928–1997)

Background information
- Born: April 22, 1928; Pittsburgh, Pennsylvania, U.S.
- Died: May 13, 1997 (aged 69)
- Genre: Jazz
- Instrument: Trumpet

Thomas Walter "Tommy" Turrentine Jr. (April 22, 1928 – May 13, 1997) was a swing and hard bop trumpeter and composer who was active between the 1940s and the 1960s. He was known for his work as a sideman with drummer Max Roach. He is also the older brother of the saxophonist Stanley Turrentine.

== Early Life ==
Thomas Walter Turrentine Jr., known professionally as Tommy Turrentine, was born in Pittsburgh, Pennsylvania. He was the elder brother of jazz saxophonist Stanley Turrentine by six years and the son of Thomas Turrentine Sr., a saxophonist who performed with Al Cooper's Savoy Sultans during the 1930s. Although his father and younger brother played the saxophone, Turrentine chose the trumpet as his signature instrument. Tommy Turrentine had four other siblings, and the five of them each received musical training. Music had always been in the Turrentine family, Stanley recounting in an interview that their father would turn on the radio and they would listen to big bands and then guess who was playing certain instruments.

Turrentine demonstrated considerable musical ability from an early age. By the age of 18, he had joined Benny Carter's big band, marking the beginning of his professional career. In his early twenties, he played with Billy Eckstine, Dizzy Gillespie and briefly with Count Basie (1951). In the following year (1952), Turrentine joined a small group led by the saxophonist and vocalist Gay Crosse featuring John Coltrane. He toured with George Hudson's orchestra, whose members included future Count Basie arranger Ernie Wilkins and pianist Fritz Jones, later known as Ahmad Jamal. Turrentine's brother Stanley performed his first professional gig with him at a bar in Pittsburgh, which kick-started Stanley's career. Turrentine and his brother then joined Earl Bostic in 1952-53 for three years. Although they weren't given any major solos, both Turrentine brothers were present on some of Bostic's major selling records, such as the song "Off Shore."

== Later Life and Career ==
Turrentine played in the bands of Benny Carter, Earl Bostic, Charles Mingus, Billy Eckstine, Dizzy Gillespie, and Count Basie. He later recorded with Sonny Clark, Lou Donaldson, and his brother Stanley's bands. His working relationship with Max Roach was spawned in part when Turrentine and his brother joined the Max Roach Quintet in the 1959. From this they both received major exposure. With Max Roach, Tommy and Stanley took part in some enduring works, including Quiet as it’s Kept, Abbey Lincoln’s Abbey is Blue, and the drum battle Rich vs. Roach (as in Buddy Rich versus Max Roach). In 1960, while with Roach, Turrentine also recorded his first (and last) album, the eponymous Tommy Turrentine. He was accompanied by his Roach bandmates plus pianist Horace Parlan. While his compositions gained attention, ironically he was better known for being a sideman. When his brother Stanley Turrentine signed with Blue Note Records, Tommy Turrentine joined as a sideman on his first Blue Note album, Comin’ Your Way. Turrentine also wrote the song “Thomasville” for that record, which later became one of his most enduring compositions. He continued to play with and record for Blue Note, appearing on Horace Parlan’s On the Spur of the Moment and Up & Down, Jackie McLean’s A Fickle Sonance and Sonny Clark’s classic Leapin’ and Lopin’. In 1962-63, he appeared on and helped write Stanley Turrentine’s Jubilee Shout!!!, That’s Where it’s At and Never Let Me Go, John Patton’s Blue John and Lou Donaldson’s The Natural Soul.

Early in 1964, Turrentine worked briefly in the "Five Spot" club in New York with a temporary Charles Mingus group but his appearances on record were infrequent. In 1966, Archie Shepp chose Turrentine as a partner for Mama Too Tight, an album made for the Impulse label. Turrentine was also adept on the piano at chord blockings and was a compositional exponent of Thelonious Monk's earlier chordal voicings. His bebop compositions combined a sophisticated and emotional fusion and poignant lyricism reminiscent of Benny Golson and with the passionate, spirited influence of the Clifford Brown/Max Roach Quintet. Tommy Turrentine was rarely active after the 1970s, being in semi-retirement. In the summer of 1979, he was one of several star trumpeters (including Jon Faddis and others) who appeared at the Village Gate for an all-star tribute to Blue Mitchell who had died earlier that year. Turrentine also appeared on the 1989 album Blue Delight by keyboardist Sun Ra, this being one of his last-known recording sessions.

While his brother had a successful career and recorded a number of albums over his lifetime, Tommy only recorded one album under his name before retiring in the late 1960s. However, for a brief period of time, Stanley and Tommy Turrentine had parallel careers before he retired from music. In the 1970s he lived on the ground floor of a brownstone with his wife, Jane on West 82nd Street in New York City, a street which during that period had a number of jazz luminaries living along its blocks between Broadway and Central Park, including Tommy Flanagan and Pharoah Sanders.

== Playing Style ==
Heavily oriented in hard-bop, Turrentine's playing style has been described as full and warm, throughout his trumpet's full range. He often plays in long, unbroken, melodic lines full of feelings. He had the ability to construct extended solos with various melodic improvisations. His solos built towards extended climaxes, and his melodic approach is relatively traditional, in comparison to younger more experimental players from the same time. His playing is also comparable with that of Kenny Dorham or Fats Navarro.

== Death ==
Turrentine died of cancer in New York City on May 13, 1997, at the age of 69.

== Legacy ==
Tommy Turrentine was every bit the musician that his younger brother was, yet Stanley Turrentine became a bona fide jazz legend, while Tommy Turrentine, is unknown to all but ardent jazz fans and the many musicians who still marvel at his gifts, both as a trumpet player and as a composer. While his brother Stanley Turrentine took the spotlight, Tommy Turrentine who recorded only one album as a leader in his entire career. He faded into obscurity as he retired much earlier than his brother. During his time with Blue Note Records, Turrentine was arguably an equal in terms of technique between Blue Note’s other rising trumpet stars Freddie Hubbard and Lee Morgan. Turrentine was also said to suffer from health problems that affected his ability to work which may have made a difference in his prominence.

== Discography ==
=== As leader ===
- 1960: Tommy Turrentine (Time Records, 1960) – with Stanley Turrentine, trombonist Julian Priester, pianist Horace Parlan, bassist Bob Boswell, drummer Max Roach

=== As sideman ===
With Ahmed Abdul-Malik

- The Music of Ahmed Abdul-Malik (New Jazz, 1961)
- Sounds of Africa (New Jazz, 1961)

With Paul Chambers

- 1st Bassman (VeeJay, 1960)

With Sonny Clark

- Leapin' and Lopin' (Blue Note, 1961)

With Lou Donaldson

- The Natural Soul (Blue Note, 1962)
- Signifyin' (Argo, 1963)

With Booker Ervin

- The Book Cooks (Bethlehem, 1960)

With Dexter Gordon

- Landslide (Blue Note, 1961-62 [1980])

With Rufus Jones

- Five on Eight (Cameo, 1964)

With Philly Joe Jones

- Mean What You Say (Sonet, 1977)

With Abbey Lincoln

- Abbey Is Blue (Riverside, 1959)

With Jackie McLean

- A Fickle Sonance (Blue Note, 1961)

With Horace Parlan

- Speakin' My Piece (Blue Note, 1960)
- On the Spur of the Moment (Blue Note 1961)

With John Patton

- Blue John (Blue Note, 1963)

With Max Roach

- Quiet as It's Kept (Mercury, 1959)
- Moon Faced and Starry Eyed (Mercury, 1959)
- Long as You're Living (Enja, 1960 [1984])
- Parisian Sketches (Mercury, 1960)

With Archie Shepp

- Mama Too Tight (Impulse!, 1966)

With Sun Ra

- Blue Delight (A&M, 1989)

With Stanley Turrentine

- Comin' Your Way (Blue Note, 1961)
- Jubilee Shout!!! (Blue Note, 1962)
- A Bluish Bag (Blue Note, 1967)
- The Man with the Sad Face (Fantasy, 1976)
