= Leapin' and Lopin' =

Studio album by Sonny Clark
- Released: May 1962
- Recorded: November 13, 1961
- Studio: Van Gelder Studio; Englewood Cliffs, NJ
- Genre: Jazz
- Length: 41:35; 55:31 (CD reissue)
- Label: Blue Note; BLP 4091 (mono); BST 84091 (stereo)
- Producer: Alfred Lion

Sonny Clark chronology
Sonny Clark Trio (1960)	Leapin' and Lopin' (1962)

Leapin' and Lopin' is an album by American jazz pianist Sonny Clark, recorded on November 13, 1961 and released on Blue Note in May 1962—Clark's final album as leader before his death the following year.

== Background ==
Leapin' and Lopin' features a guest appearance from sax player Ike Quebec, who was mounting a comeback after a decade of low visibility. The rhythm section of Clark, Butch Warren, and Billy Higgins would also appear on sessions with Dexter Gordon yielding his albums for Blue Note Go! and A Swingin' Affair.

== Reception ==
Professional ratings
Review scores
Source	Rating
AllMusic	4.5/5 stars
The Rolling Stone Jazz Record Guide	3/5 stars
The Penguin Guide to Jazz Recordings	3.5/4 stars

The AllMusic review by Michael Nastos calls Leapin' and Lopin' "a definitive recording for Clark, and really for all time in the mainstream jazz idiom."

All About Jazz stated, "Although pianist Sonny Clark had documented much fine music up to this point, one of his final recordings before an untimely death, everything seemed to solidify with this 1961 ringer."

== Track listing ==
All tracks are written by Sonny Clark, except as noted.

Side one
No.	Title	Writer(s)	Length
1.	"Somethin' Special"		6:23
2.	"Deep in a Dream"	Jimmy Van Heusen; Eddie DeLange	6:47
3.	"Melody for C"		7:50

Side two
No.	Title	Writer(s)	Length
1.	"Eric Walks"	Butch Warren	5:41
2.	"Voodoo"		7:39
3.	"Midnight Mambo"	Tommy Turrentine	7:15

2008 reissue bonus tracks
No.	Title	Length
7.	"Zellmar's Delight"	5:43
8.	"Melody for C" (alternate take)	8:13

== Personnel ==
- Sonny Clark – piano
- Tommy Turrentine – trumpet (except "Deep in a Dream")
- Charlie Rouse – tenor saxophone (except "Deep in a Dream")
- Ike Quebec – tenor saxophone ("Deep in a Dream")
- Butch Warren – bass
- Billy Higgins – drums
