= Al Harewood =

American jazz musician

Al Harewood (June 3, 1923 – March 13, 2014) was an American jazz drummer and teacher. He played the drums left-handed.

== Biography ==
Harewood was born in Brooklyn. As a musician he worked with many jazz musicians including the J.J. Johnson/Kai Winding group, the Art Farmer/Gigi Gryce band, David Amram, Betty Carter, and the Curtis Fuller-Benny Golson Sextet. Harewood played on many jazz recordings under the leadership of Lou Donaldson, Horace Parlan, Ike Quebec, Dexter Gordon and Grant Green and had a long association with saxophonist Stanley Turrentine from 1959 onwards. He played briefly with Mary Lou Williams in 1962, then joined Stan Getz, and later returned to working with David Amram, with whom he had previously played in the 1950s. In the mid-1970s, he started working as an instructor at Livingstone College. From 1983, he played with Lee Konitz.

Harewood died in March 2014 at the age of 90.

== Selected discography ==
With Ahmed Abdul-Malik

- Jazz Sahara (Riverside, 1958)
- East Meets West (RCA Victor, 1959 [1960])

With Betty Carter

- Finally, Betty Carter (Roulette, 1969 [1975])
- Round Midnight (Roulette, 1969 [1975])

With Lou Donaldson

- Sonny Side Up (Blue Note, 1960 [1961])
- Midnight Sun (Blue Note, 1960 [1980])
- Lush Life (Blue Note, 1967 [1980])

With Curtis Fuller

- Two Bones (Blue Note, 1958 [1980])
- Blues-ette (Savoy, 1959 [1960])
- Blues-ette Part II (Savoy, 1993)

With Grant Green

- Grantstand (Blue Note, 1961 [1962])
- Remembering (Blue Note, 1961 [1980])
- Idle Moments (Blue Note, 1963 [1965])

With Horace Parlan

- Movin' & Groovin' (Blue Note, 1960)
- Us Three (Blue Note, 1960)
- Speakin' My Piece (Blue Note, 1960 [1961])
- Headin' South (Blue Note, 1960)
- On the Spur of the Moment (Blue Note, 1961)
- Up & Down (Blue Note, 1961 [1963])
- Frank-ly Speaking (SteepleChase, 1977)

With Ike Quebec

- Heavy Soul (Blue Note, 1961 [1962])
- It Might as Well Be Spring (Blue Note, 1961 [1962])

With Stanley Turrentine

- Look Out! (Blue Note, 1960)
- Comin' Your Way (Blue Note, 1961 [1987])
- Up at "Minton's", Vol. 1 (Blue Note, 1961)
- Up at "Minton's", Vol. 2 (Blue Note, 1961 [1962])
- Jubilee Shout!!! (Blue Note, 1962 [1986])
- Never Let Me Go (Blue Note, 1963)
- A Chip Off the Old Block (Blue Note, 1963 [1964])

With Kai Winding

- K + J.J. (Bethlehem, 1955) – with J. J. Johnson
- Rainy Day (Verve, 1965)

With others

- Toshiko Akiyoshi: Remembering Bud: Cleopatra's Dream (Nippon Crown/Evidence, 1990)
- David Amram: Subway Night (RCA Victor, 1973)
- Benny Carter: Cookin' at Carlos I (MusicMasters 1988 [1990])
- Booker Ervin: That's It! (Candid, 1961)
- Benny Golson: Gone with Golson (New Jazz, 1959)
- Dexter Gordon: Doin' Allright (Blue Note, 1961)
- Dodo Greene: My Hour of Need (Blue Note, 1962 [1963])
- Bobby Hutcherson: The Kicker (Blue Note, 1963 [1999])
- Dick Katz: In High Profile (Bee Hive, 1984)
- Lee Konitz: Ideal Scene (Soul Note, 1986)
- Dizzy Reece: Comin' On! (Blue Note, 1960 [1999])
- Buddy Tate, Al Grey: Just Jazz (Uptown, 1984)
