= Long as You're Living =

Live album by Max Roach
- Released: 1984
- Recorded: February 5, 1960; Fruit Hall, Kaiserslautern, West Germany
- Genre: Jazz
- Length: 53:05
- Label: Enja; ENJ 4074
- Producer: Joachim-Ernst Berendt

Max Roach chronology
Moon Faced and Starry Eyed (1959)	Long as You're Living (1984)	Parisian Sketches (1960)

Long as You're Living is a live album by American jazz drummer Max Roach, featuring tracks recorded in West Germany in 1960 and released on the Enja label.

== Reception ==
Professional ratings
Review scores
Source	Rating
Allmusic	3/5 stars

Allmusic awarded the album 3 stars, with the review by Scott Yanow stating: "Although the playing of The Turrentines is not at the same innovative level as Roach's prior group with Booker Little and George Coleman, they come up with consistently fresh statements during the well-rounded set and the tenorman was already instantly recognizable."

== Track listing ==
All compositions by Max Roach except as indicated

1. "Lotus Blossom" (Kenny Dorham) – 7:33
2. "Drum Conversation" – 6:55
3. "The Villa" (Dorham) – 7:39
4. "Long as You're Living" (Julian Priester, Tommy Turrentine) – 10:27
5. "A Night in Tunisia" (Dizzy Gillespie, Frank Paparelli) – 12:07
6. "Prelude" (Consuela Lee) – 8:03 Bonus track on CD reissue
7. "Drum Talk" – 2:17 Bonus track on CD reissue

== Personnel ==
- Max Roach – drums
- Tommy Turrentine – trumpet
- Julian Priester – trombone
- Stanley Turrentine – tenor saxophone
- Bob Boswell – bass
