= Tippin' the Scales =

Studio album by Jackie McLean
- Released: 1979 (Japan); 1984 (US)
- Recorded: September 28, 1962
- Studios: Van Gelder Studio, Englewood Cliffs, NJ
- Genre: Jazz blues
- Length: 36:00
- Labels: Blue Note; GXF 3062 (1979); BST 84427 (1984)
- Producer: Alfred Lion

Jackie McLean chronology
Let Freedom Ring (1962)	Tippin' the Scales (1979)	Vertigo (1962-63)

Alternative cover
- 1984 US edition (BST 84427)

Tippin' the Scales is an album by American saxophonist Jackie McLean. It was originally recorded in 1962, but was first released only in 1979 on the Japanese Blue Note label as GXF 3062, then finally released in the U.S. in 1984 as BST 84427. The CD reissue, released in 1989 and now out of print, added three alternate takes as bonus tracks.

== Reception ==
Professional ratings
Review scores
Source	Rating
Allmusic	4/5 stars

The Allmusic review by Steve Huey awarded the album 4 stars and stated: "Though it's one of the more conventional items in McLean's discography, Tippin' the Scales offers an opportunity to hear the altoist in an uncommonly relaxed quartet setting, playing at a typically high level of musicianship."

== Track listing ==
1. "Tippin' the Scales" (McLean) - 6:03
2. "Rainy Blues" (McLean) - 5:13
3. "Nursery Blues" (Sonny Clark) - 6:38
4. "Nicely" (Clark) - 6:29
5. "Two for One" (Clark) - 6:04
6. "Cabin in the Sky" (Vernon Duke) - 5:33

Bonus tracks on CD reissue (1989)

7. "Tippin' the Scales" [Alternate Take]
8. "Two for One"[Alternate Take 1]
9. "Two for One" [Alternate Take 2]

== Personnel ==
- Jackie McLean - alto saxophone
- Sonny Clark - piano
- Butch Warren - bass
- Art Taylor - drums
