= Free Form (Donald Byrd album) =

Studio album by Donald Byrd
- Released: October 1966
- Recorded: December 11, 1961
- Studio: Van Gelder Studio, Englewood Cliffs, New Jersey
- Genre: Jazz
- Length: 40:21; 45:33 with bonus track
- Label: Blue Note; BST 84118
- Producer: Alfred Lion

Donald Byrd chronology
Royal Flush (1961)	Free Form (1966)	A New Perspective (1963)

Alternative cover
- 2004 CD cover

Free Form is an album by American trumpeter Donald Byrd featuring Byrd with Wayne Shorter, Herbie Hancock, Butch Warren, and Billy Higgins recorded in 1961 and released on the Blue Note label later in 1966. It was remastered in 2003 and reissued on CD. On the CD reissue, the original stereo release is erroneously given as "BST 84106" instead of BST 84118.

== Reception ==
The Allmusic review by Michael G. Nastos awarded the album four stars and stated "Free Form is both a smorgasbord of modern jazz styles and a breakthrough album showing the Detroit born trumpeter's versatility and interest in diversity... This may be close to Donald Byrd's best early work, a strong statement that is by no means homogeneous, but expresses many of the avenues in jazz he was exploring while finding his own unique voice on the trumpet".

Professional ratings
Review scores
Source	Rating
AllMusic	4/5 stars
The Penguin Guide to Jazz	3/4 stars

== Track listing ==
All compositions by Donald Byrd except as indicated

1. "Pentecostal Feelin'" - 6:43
2. "Night Flower" (Herbie Hancock) - 6:48
3. "Nai Nai" - 6:37
4. "French Spice" - 8:02
5. "Free Form" - 11:11
6. "Three Wishes" (Hancock) - 5:12 Bonus track on CD reissue

== Personnel ==
- Donald Byrd - trumpet
- Wayne Shorter - tenor saxophone
- Herbie Hancock - piano
- Butch Warren - bass
- Billy Higgins - drums
