= A Man with a Horn =

A Man With a Horn

Studio album by Lou Donaldson
- Released: October 19, 1999
- Recorded: September 25, 1961, and June 7, 1963
- Studio: Van Gelder Studio, Englewood Cliffs, NJ
- Genre: Jazz
- Length: 55:48
- Label: Blue Note; Blue Note 21436
- Producer: Alfred Lion

Lou Donaldson chronology
Gravy Train (1961)	A Man With a Horn (1999)	The Natural Soul (1962)

Professional ratings
Review scores
Source	Rating
Allmusic	3/5 stars

A Man With a Horn is an album by jazz saxophonist Lou Donaldson featuring 1961 & 1963 sessions recorded for the Blue Note label (but not released until 1999), one performed by Donaldson with organist Brother Jack McDuff, guitarist Grant Green and drummer Joe Dukes, and the other with Grant Green, trumpeter Irvin Stokes, Big John Patton and drummer Ben Dixon.

The album was awarded 3 stars in an Allmusic review by Al Campbell, who states "This is a mainly mellow affair with six of the nine tracks exchanging the hard bop and soul-jazz of the times for ballads and slow blues. However, the occasional up-tempo funky surprise does pop up".

== Track listing ==
All compositions by Lou Donaldson except as indicated

1. "Misty" (Johnny Burke, Erroll Garner) – 8:32
2. "Hippity Hop" – 5:46
3. "Please" (Ralph Rainger, Leo Robin) – 6:09
4. "My Melancholy Baby" (Ernie Burnett, George Norton) – 6:31
5. "The Man with a Horn" (Eddie DeLange, Jack Jenney, Bonnie Lake) – 5:49
6. "Cherry Pink (and Apple Blossom White)" (Louis Guglielmi) – 4:24
7. "Prisoner of Love" (Russ Columbo, Clarence Gaskill, Leo Robin) – 5:12
8. "Soul Meetin' " – 7:13
9. "Stardust (Hoagy Carmichael, Mitchell Parish) – 6:12

Recorded on September 25, 1961 (#1, 3, 5, 7, 9) and June 7, 1963 (#2, 4, 6, 8).

== Personnel ==
Tracks 1, 3, 5, 7, 9

- Lou Donaldson – alto saxophone
- Brother Jack McDuff – organ
- Grant Green – guitar
- Joe Dukes – drums

Tracks 2, 4, 6, 8

- Lou Donaldson – alto saxophone
- Irvin Stokes – trumpet
- Big John Patton – organ
- Grant Green – guitar
- Ben Dixon – drums
