= Let Freedom Ring (Jackie McLean album) =

Studio album by Jackie McLean
- Released: May 1963
- Recorded: March 19, 1962
- Studios: Van Gelder, Englewood Cliffs, New Jersey
- Genres: Hard bop, post-bop, modal jazz
- Length: 38:16
- Labels: Blue Note; BST 84106
- Producer: Alfred Lion

Jackie McLean chronology
A Fickle Sonance (1961)	Let Freedom Ring (1963)	Tippin' the Scales (1962)

Let Freedom Ring is an album by American jazz saxophonist Jackie McLean, recorded in 1962 and released on the Blue Note label. It features McLean in a quartet with pianist Walter Davis Jr., bassist Herbie Lewis and drummer Billy Higgins.

McLean wrote three of the four compositions. "Melody for Melonae" is dedicated to his daughter (as was an earlier composition, "Little Melonae"), and appeared as "Melanie" on Matador, a later recording that he made with Kenny Dorham. The slower-tempo performance on Let Freedom Ring was the first occasion that McLean used "provocative upper-register screams". "Rene" and "Omega" are both blues-related pieces, the former with a standard twelve-bar structure and harmonies, the latter more abstract and modal. The one non-McLean track is Bud Powell's ballad, "I'll Keep Loving You".

== Reception ==
The AllMusic review by Steve Huey stated: "The success of Let Freedom Ring paved the way for a bumper crop of other modernist innovators to join the Blue Note roster and, artistically, it still stands with One Step Beyond as McLean's greatest work." The Penguin Guide to Jazz gives Let Freedom Ring four out of four stars, and includes the album in a select "Core Collection".

Professional ratings
Review scores
Source	Rating
AllMusic	5/5 stars
The Penguin Guide to Jazz	4/4 stars
The Rolling Stone Jazz Record Guide	5/5 stars

== Track listing ==
All compositions by Jackie McLean except where noted

1. "Melody for Melonae" - 13:24
2. "I'll Keep Loving You" (Bud Powell) - 6:18
3. "Rene" - 10:03
4. "Omega" - 8:31

== Personnel ==
- Jackie McLean — alto saxophone
- Walter Davis, Jr. — piano
- Herbie Lewis — bass
- Billy Higgins — drums

== Charts ==
Chart performance for Let Freedom Ring
Chart (2024)	Peak position
Croatian International Albums (HDU)	40
