= The Natural Soul =

Studio album by Lou Donaldson
- Released: March 1963
- Recorded: May 9, 1962
- Studio: Van Gelder Studio, Englewood Cliffs, NJ
- Genre: Jazz
- Length: 49:07 CD reissue
- Label: Blue Note; BST 84108
- Producer: Alfred Lion

Lou Donaldson chronology
A Man with a Horn (1961)	The Natural Soul (1963)	Good Gracious! (1963)

Professional ratings
Review scores
Source	Rating
Down Beat (Original Lp release)	3/5 stars
Allmusic	4/5 stars
All About Jazz	(favorable)
The Penguin Guide to Jazz Recordings	3/4 stars

The Natural Soul is an album by jazz saxophonist Lou Donaldson recorded for the Blue Note label in 1962 and performed by Donaldson with Grant Green, Tommy Turrentine, Big John Patton, and Ben Dixon.

This album marked the debut on records of organist Big John Patton, who went on to record several more albums for Blue Note both under his own name and in conjunction with other artists such as Lou Donaldson.

The album debuted on Billboard magazine's Top Monoraul LP's chart in the issue dated June 15, 1963, peaking at No. 141 during a two-week run on the chart.

== Reception ==
The album was awarded 4 stars in an Allmusic review by Stephen Thomas Erlewine who states "The Natural Soul finds Lou Donaldson delving deeply into soul-jazz, recording a set of funky, greasy instrumentals with only a few references to hard bop... The original compositions — which form the bulk of the album — aren't much more than blues and soul vamps, but they provide an excellent foundation for the combo to work hot grooves. And, in the end, that's what The Natural Soul is about — groove. It maintains the high standards Donaldson established with his first soul-jazz foray, Here 'Tis, and remains one of his best records in that genre".

== Track listing ==
All compositions by Lou Donaldson except where noted

1. "Funky Mama" (Big John Patton) - 9:08
2. "Love Walked In" (Gershwin, Gershwin) - 5:12
3. "Spaceman Twist" - 5:38
4. "Sow Belly Blues" - 10:13
5. "That's All" (Alan Brandt, Bob Haymes) - 5:36
6. "Nice 'n' Greasy" (John Adriano Acea) - 5:27
7. "People Will Say We're in Love" (Hammerstein II, Rodgers) - 7:53 Bonus track on CD

== Personnel ==
- Lou Donaldson - alto saxophone
- Tommy Turrentine - trumpet
- Grant Green - guitar
- Big John Patton - organ
- Ben Dixon - drums

== Charts ==
Chart (1963)	Peak position
US Billboard Top LPs (Monoraul)	141
