= Landslide (album) =

Studio album by Dexter Gordon
- Released: 1980
- Recorded: May 9, 1961, May 5, 1962 and June 25, 1962
- Studio: Van Gelder Studio, Englewood Cliffs, NJ
- Genre: Jazz
- Length: 38:15
- Label: Blue Note; LT-1051
- Producer: Alfred Lion

Dexter Gordon chronology
| Dexter Calling... (1961) | Landslide (1980) | Go (1962) |

Landslide is an album by American jazz saxophonist Dexter Gordon featuring recordings from 1961 and 1962 which was first released on the Blue Note label in 1980 as part of the Blue Note Classics series.

== Reception ==
Professional ratings
Review scores
| Source | Rating |
|---|---|
| Allmusic | 3/5 stars |

The Allmusic review by Stephen Thomas Erlewine stated: "Landslide is comprised of previously unreleased material from three separate Dexter Gordon-led sessions between May 1961 and June 1962. ... All three sessions hold together fairly well, and although nothing on the record qualifies as a masterpiece, nothing is bad, either. In comparison to the released sessions, this material may pale somewhat, but it remains first-rate hard bop and is recommended to Gordon collectors".

== Track listing ==
1. "Landslide" (Dexter Gordon) – 5:12
2. "Love Locked Out" (Ray Noble, Max Kester) – 4:44
3. "You Said It" (Tommy Turrentine) – 4:28
4. "Serenade in Blue" (Harry Warren, Mack Gordon) – 4:59
5. "Blue Gardenia" (Bob Russell, Lester Lee) – 6:39
6. "Six Bits Jones" (Dexter Gordon) – 6:16
7. "Second Balcony Jump" (Billy Eckstine, Gerald Valentine) – 5:57
- Recorded at Van Gelder Studio, Englewood Cliffs, NJ on May 9, 1961 (track 1), May 5, 1962 (tracks 2–4) and June 25, 1962 (tracks 5–7)

== Personnel ==
- Dexter Gordon – tenor saxophone
- Dave Burns (tracks 5–7), Tommy Turrentine (tracks 2–4) – trumpet
- Sonny Clark (tracks 5–7), Kenny Drew (track 1), Sir Charles Thompson (tracks 2–4) – piano
- Ron Carter (tracks 5–7), Paul Chambers (track 1), Al Lucas (tracks 2–4) – bass
- Philly Joe Jones (track 1 & 5–7), Willie Bobo (tracks 2–4) – drums

== Charts ==
=== Monthly charts ===
Monthly chart performance for Landslide
| Chart (2025) | Peak position |
|---|---|
| German Jazz Albums (Offizielle Top 100) | 9 |
