= Bluesnik =

Studio album by Jackie McLean
- Released: February 1962
- Recorded: January 8, 1961
- Studios: Van Gelder, Englewood Cliffs, NJ
- Genre: Hard bop
- Length: 40:52
- Labels: Blue Note; BLP 4067
- Producer: Alfred Lion

Jackie McLean chronology
Jackie's Bag (1961)	Bluesnik (1962)	A Fickle Sonance (1962)

Bluesnik is an album by American saxophonist Jackie McLean, recorded in 1961 and released on the Blue Note label. It features McLean in a quintet with trumpeter Freddie Hubbard, pianist Kenny Drew, bassist Doug Watkins and drummer Pete La Roca.

== Reception ==
The AllMusic review by Thom Jurek stated: "Many critics-as well as jazz fans hold to the opinion that Bluesnik may be McLean's most accessible session for the label... this is a monster session effortlessly performed by a soloist at an early peak and a supporting cast of blazing sidemen." The Penguin Guide to Jazz rates the album three and a half out of four stars and describes it as "tough, unreconstructed modern blues that reveal considerable depths on subsequent hearings" and further states that the album is "an excellent record, that should be a high priority for anyone interested in McLean's music."

Professional ratings
Review scores
Source	Rating
AllMusic	4.5/5 stars
The Penguin Guide to Jazz Recordings	3.5/4 stars
The Rolling Stone Jazz Record Guide	4/5 stars

== Track listing ==
All compositions by Jackie McLean except as indicated

1. "Bluesnik" - 9:36
2. "Goin' 'Way Blues" - 6:34
3. "Drew's Blues" (Kenny Drew) - 5:52
4. "Cool Green" (Drew) - 5:20
5. "Blues Function" (Freddie Hubbard) - 7:19
6. "Torchin'" (Drew) - 6:11
7. "Goin' 'Way Blues" [alternate take] - 6:42 Bonus track on CD reissue
8. "Torchin'" (Drew) [alternate take] - 6:16 Bonus track on CD reissue

== Personnel ==
- Jackie McLean - alto saxophone
- Freddie Hubbard - trumpet
- Kenny Drew - piano
- Doug Watkins - bass
- Pete La Roca - drums

== Charts ==
Chart performance for Bluesnik
Chart (2023)	Peak position
US Top Jazz Albums (Billboard)	15
