= Moon Faced and Starry Eyed =

Studio album by Max Roach + 4
- Released: 1959
- Recorded: October 9–10, 1959
- Studio: Universal Recorders, Chicago
- Genre: Jazz
- Length: 33:36
- Label: Mercury; MG 20491
- Producer: Hal Mooney

Max Roach chronology
Quiet as It's Kept (1959)	Moon Faced and Starry Eyed (1959)	Long as You're Living (1959)

Professional ratings
Review scores
Source	Rating
Allmusic	3/5 stars

Moon Faced and Starry Eyed is an album by American jazz drummer Max Roach, featuring vocalist Abbey Lincoln on two tracks, recorded in 1959 and released on the Mercury label.

== Track listing ==
1. "You're Mine, You" (Edward Heyman, Johnny Green) – 2:46
2. "Come Rain or Come Shine" (Johnny Mercer, Harold Arlen) – 3:18
3. "Wild Is the Wind" (Dimitri Tiomkin, Ned Washington) – 3:17
4. "Speak Low" (Kurt Weill, Ogden Nash) – 2:50
5. "I Concentrate on You" (Cole Porter) – 4:51
6. "Moon Faced, Starry Eyed" (Weill, Langston Hughes) – 2:55
7. "Never Let Me Go" (Jay Livingston, Ray Evans) – 3:04
8. "Namely You" (Gene de Paul, Mercer) – 2:48
9. "Never Leave Me" (Gordon Jenkins) – 5:44

== Personnel ==
- Max Roach – drums
- Tommy Turrentine – trumpet (tracks 2, 5 & 9)
- Julian Priester – trombone (tracks 3, 5, 7 & 9)
- Stanley Turrentine – tenor saxophone (tracks 1, 5, 8 & 9)
- Ray Bryant – piano
- Bob Boswell – bass
- Abbey Lincoln – vocals (tracks 5 & 9)
