= Quiet as It's Kept =

1960 album by Max Roach

Studio album by Max Roach Plus Four
- Released: 1960
- Recorded: July 21, 1959; Capitol Studios, New York City
- Genre: Jazz, hard bop
- Length: 33:36
- Label: Mercury; MG 20491, SR 60170

Max Roach chronology
Rich Versus Roach (1959)	Quiet as It's Kept (1960)	Moon Faced and Starry Eyed (1959)

Quiet as It's Kept is an album by American jazz drummer Max Roach featuring tracks recorded in 1959 and released on the Mercury label.

== Reception ==
Professional ratings
Review scores
Source	Rating
Allmusic	3.5/5 stars

In his review for Allmusic, Michael G. Nastos stated, "this 1960 band, with the brothers Tommy and Stanley Turrentine, and Julian Priester, was short-lived, very satisfying, and one of the most memorable combos the drummer led. Continuing to concentrate on hard bop themes, the band is hardly quiet as the title would suggest. It perhaps could be said that this band was a sleeper in not being as recognized as the superior collective talent would indicate".

== Track listing ==
1. "Quiet as It's Kept" (Bill Lee) - 6:12
2. "To Lady" (Leon Mitchell) - 6:08
3. "Lotus Blossom" (Kenny Dorham) - 5:34
4. "As Long as You're Living" (Julian Priester, Tommy Turrentine) - 5:58
5. "The More I See You" (Mack Gordon, Harry Warren) - 4:04
6. "Juliano" (Priester) - 5:40

== Personnel ==
- Max Roach - drums
- Tommy Turrentine - trumpet
- Julian Priester - trombone
- Stanley Turrentine - tenor saxophone
- Bob Boswell - bass
