= A Fickle Sonance =

Studio album by Jackie McLean
- Released: End of November 1962
- Recorded: October 26, 1961
- Studios: Van Gelder, Englewood Cliffs, New Jersey, US
- Genre: Jazz
- Length: 35:18
- Labels: Blue Note; BST 84089
- Producer: Alfred Lion

Jackie McLean chronology
Bluesnik (1962)	A Fickle Sonance (1962)	Let Freedom Ring (1962)

A Fickle Sonance is an album by American saxophonist Jackie McLean, recorded in 1961 and released on the Blue Note label. It features McLean in a quintet with trumpeter Tommy Turrentine, pianist Sonny Clark, bassist Butch Warren and drummer Billy Higgins.

The "sonance" of the album’s title is an obsolete word for a sound or a tune.

The opening track "Five Will Get You Ten" was originally credited to pianist Clark, but later co-writing credit was given to Thelonious Monk. The song is now believed to have been written solely by Monk as "Two Timer", though it was never recorded by him. The song's lead sheet was allegedly discovered by Clark in Monk's home, or the home of jazz patroness Pannonica de Koenigswarter, and passed off as a Clark tune to pay for his drug addiction. The song's debut recording under its original title was by Monk's son, T. S. Monk on his 1997 album Monk on Monk.

== Reception ==
Professional ratings
Review scores
Source	Rating
AllMusic	3/5 stars
The Penguin Guide to Jazz Recordings	3/4 stars

"Five Will Get You Ten"
30 seconds of "Five Will Get You Ten"

The AllMusic review by Al Campbell stated: "Even though A Fickle Sonance preceded McLean's intense 1962 album Let Freedom Ring, the playing remained in a swinging blues-oriented style, showing no hint of the direction his music was about to take."

In a 2016 review flophouse.com said:

If Jackie McLean’s career would’ve ended right after recording A Fickle Sonance, people would certainly have pointed out the alto saxophonist’s development from one of Charlie Parker’s most proficient disciples to an alto saxophonist that made his mark with a series of excellent Blue Note recordings from 1959 to 1961, employing his highly emotional, piercing sound: already a great legacy. However, McLean raised the bars considerably the following years, breaking and entering hard bop’s living quarters with a series of vanguard recordings in cooperation with avantgardists like Ornette Coleman.

== Track listing ==
No.	Title	Writer(s)	Length
1.	"Five Will Get You Ten"	Thelonious Monk, Sonny Clark	7:06
2.	"Subdued"	Jackie McLean	5:54
3.	"Sundu"	Clark	4:54
4.	"A Fickle Sonance"	McLean	6:49
5.	"Enitnerrut"	Tommy Turrentine	5:48
6.	"Lost"	Butch Warren	4:47

== Personnel ==
- Jackie McLean – alto saxophone
- Tommy Turrentine – trumpet
- Sonny Clark – piano
- Butch Warren – bass
- Billy Higgins – drums
