= Us Three =

Studio album by Horace Parlan
- Released: 1960
- Recorded: April 20, 1960
- Studio: Van Gelder Studio, Englewood Cliffs, NJ
- Genre: Jazz
- Length: 40:43
- Label: Blue Note; BST 84037
- Producer: Alfred Lion

Horace Parlan chronology
Movin' & Groovin' (1960)	Us Three (1960)	Speakin' My Piece (1960)

Us Three is an album by American jazz pianist Horace Parlan featuring performances recorded and released on the Blue Note label in 1960.

== Reception ==
The Allmusic review by Thom Jurek awarded the album 4 stars and stated: "The proceedings here are straight-ahead with some cool soul-jazz touches... This is a fine effort from an underappreciated trio".

Professional ratings
Review scores
Source	Rating
Allmusic	4/5 stars

== Track listing ==
All compositions by Horace Parlan except as indicated

1. "Us Three" - 4:33
2. "I Want to Be Loved" (Johnny Green) - 4:50
3. "Come Rain or Come Shine" (Harold Arlen, Johnny Mercer) - 6:26
4. "Wadin'" - 5:52
5. "The Lady Is a Tramp" (Lorenz Hart, Richard Rodgers) - 7:09
6. "Walkin'" (Richard Carpenter) - 7:05
7. "Return Engagement" - 4:48

== Personnel ==
- Horace Parlan - piano
- George Tucker - bass
- Al Harewood - drums
