= Speakin' My Piece =

Studio album by the Horace Parlan Quintet
- Released: 1960
- Recorded: July 14, 1960; Van Gelder Studio, Englewood Cliffs
- Genre: Jazz
- Length: 42:52
- Label: Blue Note; BST 84043
- Producer: Alfred Lion

Horace Parlan chronology
| Us Three (1960) | Speakin' My Piece (1960) | Headin' South (1960) |

Speakin' My Piece is an album by American jazz pianist Horace Parlan and his quintet, recorded and released on the Blue Note label in 1960.

== Reception ==
The Allmusic review by Stephen Thomas Erlewine awarded the album 4 stars and stated: "Speakin' My Piece is one of the first albums to find Parlan getting all the ingredients right, from his own subtle playing to soliciting fine contributions of his backing band... a charmingly low-key session".

John S Wilson gave the album 4 stars in his review for DownBeat. Wilson wrote, "Tommy Turrentine’s biting brassiness on trumpet and Parlan’s disciplined piano work help to sustain the over-all atmosphere, but it is Stanley Turrentine who sets the tone and carries the major part of the load in this set. He is extremely impressive".

Professional ratings
Review scores
| Source | Rating |
|---|---|
| Allmusic | 4/5 stars |
| DownBeat | 4/5 stars |

== Track listing ==
All compositions by Horace Parlan except as indicated

1. "Wadin'" - 6:08
2. "Up in Cynthia's Room" - 6:20
3. "Borderline" (Stanley Turrentine) - 6:13
4. "Rastus" (Tommy Turrentine) - 6:54
5. "Oh So Blue" (Leon Mitchell) - 7:41
6. "Speakin' My Piece" - 6:11
7. "Rastus" [alternate take] (Tommy Turrentine) 6:49 Bonus track on CD reissue
8. "Oh So Blue" [alternate take] (Mitchell) - 7:41 Bonus track on CD reissue

== Personnel ==
- Horace Parlan - piano
- Tommy Turrentine - trumpet
- Stanley Turrentine - tenor saxophone
- George Tucker - bass
- Al Harewood - drums
