= Jubilee Shout!!! =

Studio album by Stanley Turrentine
- Released: 1986
- Recorded: October 18, 1962
- Studio: Van Gelder Studio, Englewood Cliffs, NJ
- Genre: Jazz
- Length: 47:37
- Label: Blue Note; BST 84122
- Producer: Alfred Lion

Stanley Turrentine chronology
That's Where It's At (1962)	Jubilee Shout!!! (1986)	Never Let Me Go (1963)

Professional ratings
Review scores
Source	Rating
Allmusic	4/5 stars

Jubilee Shout!!! is an album by jazz saxophonist Stanley Turrentine, recorded for the Blue Note label in 1962, but not released until 1986. The selection was originally included on the double LP Jubilee Shouts (1978, BN-LA883-J2), together with some tracks later appeared as Comin' Your Way. Said LP, however, omitted some tracks which may be found on the CD editions of both albums.

== Reception ==
The Allmusic review by Ron Wynn & Michael Erlewine awarded the album 4 stars and calls it a "classic funky soul-jazz groove".

== Track listing ==
All compositions by Stanley Turrentine except where noted

1. "Jubilee Shout" - 10:44
2. "My Ship" (Kurt Weill, Ira Gershwin) - 5:59
3. "You Said It" (Tommy Turrentine) - 5:36
4. "Brother Tom" - 7:43
5. "Cotton Walk" - 10:58
6. "Little Girl Blue" (Richard Rodgers, Lorenz Hart) - 6:27

== Personnel ==
- Stanley Turrentine - tenor saxophone
- Tommy Turrentine - trumpet
- Kenny Burrell - guitar
- Sonny Clark - piano
- Butch Warren - bass
- Al Harewood - drums

=== Production ===
- Alfred Lion - producer
- Reid Miles - design
- Rudy Van Gelder - engineer
- Francis Wolff - photography
