= A Bluish Bag =

Studio album by Stanley Turrentine
- Released: June 5, 2007
- Recorded: February 17, 1967 (#1–7); June 9, 1967 (#8–12)
- Studio: Van Gelder Studio, Englewood Cliffs, NJ
- Genre: Jazz
- Length: 62:41
- Label: Blue Note; Blue Note 85193
- Producer: Alfred Lion

Stanley Turrentine chronology
The Spoiler (1966)	A Bluish Bag (2007)	The Return of the Prodigal Son (1967)

A Bluish Bag is an album by jazz saxophonist Stanley Turrentine consisting of two sessions recorded for the Blue Note label in 1967 and arranged by Duke Pearson, the first featuring Donald Byrd and the second McCoy Tyner, among others.

== Reception ==
Professional ratings
Review scores
Source	Rating
Allmusic	3.5/5 stars
The Penguin Guide to Jazz Recordings	3/4 stars

The Allmusic review by Steve Leggett awarded the album 3½ stars and states:

A Bluish Bag doesn't rewrite the book on Turrentine, but it shows that, whether large ensemble or small, he always brought his game.

— Steve Leggett, Allmusic

== Track listing ==
No.	Title	Writer(s)	Length
1.	"Blues for Del"	Stanley Turrentine	4:14
2.	"She's a Carioca"	Vinicius de Moraes, Ray Gilbert, Antônio Carlos Jobim	6:31
3.	"Manhã de Carnaval"	Luiz Bonfá, Antônio Maria	5:53
4.	"Here's That Rainy Day"	Jimmy Van Heusen, Johnny Burke	5:32
5.	"What Now My Love"	Gilbert Bécaud, Pierre Delanoë, Carl Sigman	4:38
6.	"Samba do Avião"	Jobim	5:12
7.	"Night Song"	Lee Adams, Charles Strouse	6:33
8.	"Days of Wine and Roses"	Henry Mancini, Johnny Mercer	6:05
9.	"Come Back to Me"	Burton Lane, Alan Jay Lerner	5:55
10.	"Silver Tears"	Mancini	5:07
11.	"A Bluish Bag"	Mancini	7:17
12.	"With This Ring"	Luther Dixon, Anthony Hester, Richard "Popcorn" Wylie	5:49

== Personnel ==
Tracks 1–7

- Stanley Turrentine – tenor saxophone
- Donald Byrd – trumpet
- Julian Priester – trombone
- Jerry Dodgion – alto saxophone, flute, alto flute
- Joe Farrell – tenor saxophone, flute
- Pepper Adams – baritone saxophone, clarinet
- Kenny Barron – piano
- Bucky Pizzarelli – guitar
- Ron Carter – bass
- Mickey Roker – drums
- Duke Pearson – arranger

Tracks 8–12

- Stanley Turrentine – tenor saxophone
- Blue Mitchell, Tommy Turrentine – trumpet
- Julian Priester – trombone
- Jerry Dodgion – alto saxophone, flute
- Al Gibbons – bass clarinet, tenor saxophone
- Pepper Adams – baritone saxophone, clarinet
- McCoy Tyner – piano
- Walter Booker – bass
- Mickey Roker – drums
- Duke Pearson – arranger

=== Production ===
- Alfred Lion – producer
- Rudy Van Gelder – engineer
