= Comin' Your Way =

Studio album by Stanley Turrentine
- Released: 1987
- Recorded: January 20, 1961
- Studios: Van Gelder Studio, Englewood Cliffs, NJ
- Genre: Jazz
- Length: 52:03
- Labels: Blue Note; BST 84065
- Producer: Alfred Lion

Stanley Turrentine chronology
Blue Hour (1960)	Comin' Your Way (1987)	Up at "Minton's" (1961)

Comin' Your Way is an album by jazz saxophonist Stanley Turrentine recorded for the Blue Note label and performed by Turrentine with his brother Tommy Turrentine, Horace Parlan, George Tucker and Al Harewood. Selections from this album had previously been issued, with additional tracks later appeared as Jubilee Shout!!! (1986), as Jubilee Shouts (1978, BN-LA883-J2).

== Reception ==
Professional ratings
Review scores
Source	Rating
Allmusic	4/5 stars

The Allmusic review by Ron Wynn awarded the album 4 stars and called it "a sumptuous '60s soul-jazz date".

== Track listing ==
1. "My Girl Is Just Enough Woman for Me" (Fields, Hague) - 6:45
2. "Then I'll Be Tired of You" (E.Y. "Yip" Harburg, Arthur Schwartz) - 6:09
3. "Fine L'il Lass" (Leon Mitchell) - 6:14
4. "Fine L'il Lass" [Alternate Take] - 5:52 (*)
5. "Thomasville" (Tommy Turrentine) - 6:36
6. "Someone to Watch Over Me" (Gershwin, Gershwin) - 7:45
7. "Stolen Sweets" (Wild Bill Davis) - 6:12
8. "Just in Time" (Comden, Green, Styne) - 6:30 (*)

(*) Bonus tracks on CD.

== Personnel ==
- Stanley Turrentine - tenor saxophone
- Tommy Turrentine - trumpet - except track 6
- Horace Parlan - piano
- George Tucker - bass
- Al Harewood - drums

=== Production ===
- Alfred Lion - producer
- Reid Miles - design
- Rudy Van Gelder - engineer
- Francis Wolff - photography
