= Go (Dexter Gordon album) =

Go!

Studio album by Dexter Gordon
- Released: Third week of December 1962
- Recorded: August 27, 1962
- Studios: Van Gelder Studio, Englewood Cliffs
- Genre: hard bop
- Length: 37:44
- Labels: Blue Note; BLP 4112
- Producer: Alfred Lion

Dexter Gordon chronology
Landslide (1961-62)	Go! (1962)	A Swingin' Affair (1962)

Go! is a studio album by jazz musician Dexter Gordon featuring Sonny Clark, Butch Warren and Billy Higgins, recorded on August 27, 1962 and released in the same year on Blue Note. According to the liner notes by Ira Gitler, this session was "not recorded in a nightclub performance but, in its informal symmetry, it matches the relaxed atmosphere that the best of those made in that manner engender. Everyone was really together, in all the most positive meanings of that word." It was recorded by Rudy Van Gelder at the Van Gelder Studio in Englewood Cliffs.

== Critical reception and legacy ==
Professional ratings
Review scores
Source	Rating
Down Beat	5/5 stars
AllMusic	5/5 stars
The Rolling Stone Jazz Record Guide	5/5 stars
The Penguin Guide to Jazz Recordings	3/4 stars

Since its release, Go! has received very positive reviews from critics, with uDiscover Music—published by Universal Music Group—declaring that it is "unanimously hailed by jazz critics as one of his greatest ever albums". AllMusic giving it a five star rating. The album was re-released in March 1999 as part of Blue Note's RVG Series, produced by Michael Cuscuna. In 2019, Go! was selected by the Library of Congress for preservation in the National Recording Registry for being "culturally, historically, or aesthetically significant".

== Track listing ==
No.	Title	Writer(s)	Length
1.	"Cheese Cake"	Dexter Gordon	6:33
2.	"I Guess I'll Hang My Tears Out to Dry"	Jule Styne, Sammy Cahn	5:23
3.	"Second Balcony Jump"	Billy Eckstine, Gerald Valentine	7:05
4.	"Love for Sale"	Cole Porter	7:40
5.	"Where Are You?"	Jimmy McHugh, Harold Adamson	5:21
6.	"Three O'Clock in the Morning"	Julián Robledo, Dorothy Terriss	5:42

== Personnel ==
- Dexter Gordon – tenor saxophone
- Sonny Clark – piano
- Butch Warren – bass
- Billy Higgins – drums
