= Never Let Me Go (Stanley Turrentine album) =

Studio album by Stanley Turrentine
- Released: Late November-early December 1963
- Recorded: January 18, 1963 (#6, 8); February 13, 1963 (#1–5, 7)
- Studios: Van Gelder Studio, Englewood Cliffs, NJ
- Genre: Jazz
- Length: 45:31
- Labels: Blue Note; BST 84129
- Producer: Alfred Lion

Stanley Turrentine chronology
Jubilee Shout!!! (1962)	Never Let Me Go (1963)	Soul Shoutin' (1963)

Never Let Me Go is the eighth album by jazz saxophonist Stanley Turrentine recorded for the Blue Note label and performed by Turrentine with Shirley Scott, Major Holley, Ray Barretto and Al Harewood, with Sam Jones and Clarence Johnston replacing Holley, Barretto and Harewood on two tracks.

== Reception ==
Professional ratings
Review scores
Source	Rating
Allmusic	4/5 stars
The Penguin Guide to Jazz Recordings	3.5/4 stars

The Allmusic review by Thom Jurek awarded the album 4 stars and calls it "massive and bright, saturated in deep soul and blues... It's a stunner".

== Track listing ==
All compositions by Stanley Turrentine except where noted.

1. "Trouble" (Harold Logan, Lloyd Price) - 5:58
2. "God Bless the Child" (Arthur Herzog, Billie Holiday) - 3:56
3. "Sara's Dance" - 6:14
4. "Without a Song" (Edward Eliscu, Billy Rose, Vincent Youmans) - 5:28
5. "Major's Minor" (Shirley Scott, Turrentine) - 6:21
6. "Never Let Me Go" (Scott) - 4:55
7. "You'll Never Get Away from Me" (Stephen Sondheim, Jule Styne) - 6:08
8. "They Can't Take That Away from Me" (George Gershwin, Ira Gershwin) - 6:31 Bonus track on CD

== Personnel ==
- Stanley Turrentine - tenor saxophone
- Shirley Scott - organ
- Major Holley (tracks 1–5 & 7), Sam Jones (tracks 6 & 8) - bass
- Al Harewood (tracks 1–5 & 7), Clarence Johnston (tracks 6 & 8) - drums
- Ray Baretto - Congas

=== Production ===
- Alfred Lion - producer
- Reid Miles - design
- Rudy Van Gelder - engineer
- Francis Wolff - photography
