= Blue Note Records discography =

Blue Note Records is a historic New York, NY jazz label founded in 1939.

== 7000 / 1200 series ==
=== 7000 series ===
The "traditional series" of 10" LPs consisted of new recordings and reissues of material from the 78 era. Some of this material was repackaged in the short-lived 1200 series of 12" LPs.

| Catalogue number | Year | Artist | Title | Notes |
|---|---|---|---|---|
| BLP 7001 | 1951 | Sidney Bechet's Blue Note Jazzmen with "Wild Bill" Davison | Sidney Bechet's Blue Note Jazzmen with "Wild Bill" Davison | |
| BLP 7002 | 1951 | Sidney Bechet | Jazz Classics, Vol. 1 | |
| BLP 7003 | 1952 | Sidney Bechet | Jazz Classics, Vol. 2 | |
| BLP 7004 | 1952 | Art Hodes and His Chicagoans | The Best in 2 Beat | |
| BLP 7005 | 1952 | Art Hodes' Hot Five with Sidney Bechet and "Wild Bill" Davison | Art Hodes' Hot Five with Sidney Bechet and "Wild Bill" Davison | |
| BLP 7006 | 1952 | Art Hodes' Blue Note Jazz Men | Dixieland Jubilee | |
| BLP 7007 | 1952 | Edmond Hall / Sidney DeParis | Jamming in Jazz: Hall-DeParis' Blue Note Jazz Men | |
| BLP 7008 | 1952 | Sidney Bechet / Bunk Johnson | Days Beyond Recall | |
| BLP 7009 | 1952 | Sidney Bechet and His Blue Note Jazz Men | Sidney Bechet and His Blue Note Jazz Men | AKA Giants of Jazz; reissue of the 1949 3×Shellac |
| BLP 7010 | 1952 | George Lewis and His New Orleans Stompers | Echoes of New Orleans | AKA George Lewis and His New Orleans Stompers, Vol. 1 |
| BLP 7011 | 1953 | James P. Johnson | Rent Party | |
| BLP 7012 | 1953 | James P. Johnson's Blue Note Jazzmen | Jazz Band Ball | |
| BLP 7013 | 1953 | George Lewis and His New Orleans Stompers | Echoes of New Orleans | AKA George Lewis and His New Orleans Stompers, Vol. 2 |
| BLP 7014 | 1953 | Sidney Bechet's Blue Note Jazzmen with "Wild Bill" Davison | Sidney Bechet's Blue Note Jazzmen with "Wild Bill" Davison, Vol. 2 | reissue of early fifties Vogue album |
| BLP 7015 | 1953 | Art Hodes' Hot Seven with Max Kaminsky and Bujie Centobie | Dixieland Clambake | |
| BLP 7016 | 1953 | Sidney DeParis' Blue Note Stompers with Jimmy Archey and Omer Simeon | Sidney DeParis' Blue Note Stompers with Jimmy Archey and Omer Simeon | |
| BLP 7017 | 1953 | Albert Ammons Memorial Album | Boogie Woogie Classics | |
| BLP 7018 | 1953 | Meade Lux Lewis | Boogie Woogie Classics | |
| BLP 7019 | 1953 | Pete Johnson | Boogie Woogie Blues and Skiffle | |
| BLP 7020 | 1953 | The Fabulous Sidney Bechet and His Hot Six with Sidney DeParis | The Fabulous Sidney Bechet and His Hot Six with Sidney DeParis | |
| BLP 7021 | 1953 | Art Hodes' Back Room Boys | Out of the Back Room | |
| BLP 7022 | 1953 | Sidney Bechet | Port of Harlem Six | |
| BLP 7023 | 1953 | Mezz Mezzrow and His Band Featuring Lee Collins and Zutty Singleton | Mezz Mezzrow and His Band Featuring Lee Collins and Zutty Singleton | |
| BLP 7024 | 1953 | Sidney Bechet | Jazz Festival Concert, Paris 1952, Vol. 1 | |
| BLP 7025 | 1954 | Sidney Bechet | Jazz Festival Concert, Paris 1952, Vol. 2 | |
| BLP 7026 | 1954 | Sidney Bechet | Dixie by the Fabulous Sidney Bechet | |
| BLP 7027 | 1955 | George Lewis and His New Orleans Stompers | George Lewis and His New Orleans Stompers, Vol. 3 | |
| BLP 7028 | 1955 | George Lewis and His New Orleans Stompers | George Lewis and His New Orleans Stompers, Vol. 4 | |
| BLP 7029 | 1955 | Sidney Bechet | Olympia Concert, Paris 1954, Vol. 1 | |
| BLP 7030 | N/A | Sidney Bechet | Olympia Concert, Paris 1954, Vol. 2 | Unissued |

=== 1200 series ===
| Catalogue number | Year | Artist | Title | Notes |
|---|---|---|---|---|
| BLP 1201 | 1955 | Sidney Bechet | Jazz Classics, Volume 1 | |
| BLP 1202 | 1955 | Sidney Bechet | Jazz Classics, Volume 2 | |
| BLP 1203 | 1955 | Sidney Bechet | Giants of Jazz, Volume 1 | |
| BLP 1204 | 1955 | Sidney Bechet | Giants of Jazz, Volume 2 | |
| BLP 1205 | 1955 | George Lewis and His New Orleans Stompers | George Lewis and His New Orleans Stompers, Volume One | |
| BLP 1206 | 1955 | George Lewis and His New Orleans Stompers | George Lewis and His New Orleans Stompers, Volume Two | |
| BLP 1207 | 1958 | Sidney Bechet | The Fabulous Sidney Bechet | |
| BLP 1208 | 1959 | George Lewis and His New Orleans Stompers | Concert! | |
| (F) BLP 1209 | 1983 | Albert Ammons, Pete Johnson | Boogie Woogie Classics | |

== Modern Jazz Series ==
=== Modern Jazz 5000 series ===
The Blue Note Modern Jazz Series began late in 1951 with the following 10" monaural LPs. Some of these LPs were later reissued as part of the Blue Note 1500 Series of 12" LPs. At first, recordings were made in various studios in New York (Reeves Sound Studio, WOR Studios, Apex Studios, Audio Video Studios). Beginning in October 1953, however, most Blue Note sessions took place in Rudy Van Gelder's home studio in Hackensack, New Jersey. The sessions were produced by Alfred Lion and engineered by Van Gelder, and many LP covers featured photographs by Lion's partner in Blue Note Francis Wolff.

| Catalog number | Year | Artist | Title | Date recorded | Notes |
|---|---|---|---|---|---|
| BLP 5001 | 1952 | Various artists | Mellow the Mood | 2/5/44, 6/18/44, 9/25/44, 7/17/45, 5/31/46, 1/31/55 | |
| BLP 5002 | 1952 | Thelonious Monk | Genius of Modern Music | 10/15/47, 11/21/47, 7/2/48 | reissued on BLP 1510/11 |
| BLP 5003 | 1952 | The Amazing Bud Powell | The Amazing Bud Powell | 1949-08-08, 1951-05-01 | reissued on BLP 1503/04 |
| BLP 5004 | 1952 | Fats Navarro / Tadd Dameron | Fats Navarro Memorial Album | 9/26/47, 9/13/48, 10/11/48, 8/8/49 | reissued on BLP 1531/32 |
| BLP 5005 | 1952 | James Moody | James Moody with Strings | 7/13/51 | conducted by André Hodeir |
| BLP 5006 | 1952 | James Moody and His Modernists | James Moody and His Modernists | 10/18/48, 10/25/48 | |
| BLP 5007 | 1952 | Erroll Garner | Overture to Dawn, Volume 1 | 12/14/44 | |
| BLP 5008 | 1952 | Erroll Garner | Overture to Dawn, Volume 2 | 12/26/44 | |
| BLP 5009 | 1952 | Thelonious Monk | Genius of Modern Music, Vol. 2 | 1947-10-15, -24, -11-21, 1948-07-02, 1951-07-23 | reissued on BLP 1510/11 |
| BLP 5010 | 1952 | Max Roach Quintet and Art Blakey's Band | New Sounds | 12/22/47, 4/30/49, 5/15/49 | |
| BLP 5011 | 1952 | Milt Jackson | Wizard of the Vibes | 1951-07-23, 1952-04-07 | reissued on BLP 1509 |
| BLP 5012 | 1952 | Howard McGhee's All-Stars | The McGhee / Navarro Boptet | 1948, 1/23/50 | |
| BLP 5013 | 1953 | Miles Davis | Young Man with a Horn | 1952-05-09 | reissued on BLP 1501/02 |
| BLP 5014 | 1953 | Erroll Garner | Overture to Dawn, Volume 3 | 11/24/44, 12/23/44, 12/25/44 | |
| BLP 5015 | 1953 | Erroll Garner | Overture to Dawn, Volume 4 | 11/16/44, 12/20/44, 12/23/44, 12/25/44 | |
| BLP 5016 | 1953 | Erroll Garner | Overture to Dawn, Volume 5 | 12/14/44, 12/26/44 | |
| BLP 5017 | 1953 | Dizzy Gillespie | Horn of Plenty | 3/2/47, 4/11/52 | |
| BLP 5018 | 1953 | Horace Silver Trio | New Faces – New Sounds | 1952-10-09, -20 | reissued on BLP 1520 |
| BLP 5019 | 1953 | The Swinging Swedes / The Cool Britons | New Sounds from the Old World | 7/29/50, 9/5/51 | |
| BLP 5020 | 1953 | Gil Mellé Quintet/Sextet | New Faces – New Sounds | 3/2/52, 1/31/53 | |
| BLP 5021 | 1953 | Lou Donaldson Quintet / Quartet | New Faces – New Sounds | 1952-06-20, -11-19 | reissued on BLP 1537 |
| BLP 5022 | 1953 | Miles Davis | Miles Davis, Vol. 2 | 1953-04-20 | reissued on BLP 1501/02 |
| BLP 5023 | 1953 | Kenny Drew Trio | New Faces – New Sounds | 1953-04-16 | |
| BLP 5024 | 1953 | Howard McGhee | Howard McGhee, Volume 2 | 1953-05-20 | |
| BLP 5025 | 1953 | Wynton Kelly Trio | New Faces – New Sounds | 7/25/51, 8/1/51 | |
| BLP 5026 | 1953 | Various artists | Memorable Sessions | 1/25/44, 2/5/51 | |
| BLP 5027 | 1953 | Various artists | Swing Hi – Swing Lo | 1/31/45, 7/17/45, 11/21/45, 9/23/46 | |
| BLP 5028 | 1953 | Jay Jay Johnson | Jay Jay Johnson | 1953-06-22 | AKA Jay Jay Johnson with Clifford Brown; reissued on BLP 1505/06 |
| BLP 5029 | 1953 | Elmo Hope Trio | New Faces – New Sounds | 6/53 | |
| BLP 5030 | 1953 | Lou Donaldson–Clifford Brown | New Faces – New Sounds | 1953-06-09 | reissued on BLP 1526 |
| BLP 5031 | 1953 | Wade Legge Trio | New Faces – New Sounds | 2/27/53 | |
| BLP 5032 | 1953 | Clifford Brown | New Star on the Horizon | 1953-08-28 | reissued on BLP 1526 |
| BLP 5033 | 1954 | Gil Mellé Quintet | Gil Mellé Quintet, Vol. 2 | 3/25/53 | |
| BLP 5034 | 1954 | Horace Silver Trio | Horace Silver Trio and Art Blakey, Vol. 2 | 1953-11-23 | AKA Horace Silver Trio, Volume 2 / Art Blakey – Spotlight on Drums; reissued on BLP 1520 |
| BLP 5035 | 1954 | Sal Salvador Quintet | Sal Salvador Quintet | 12/24/53 | |
| BLP 5036 | 1954 | Urbie Green Septet | New Faces – New Sounds | 12/27/53 | |
| BLP 5037 | 1954 | Art Blakey Quintet | A Night at Birdland, Vol. 1 | 1954-02-21 | live at Birdland; reissued on BLP 1521/22 |
| BLP 5038 | 1954 | Art Blakey Quintet | A Night at Birdland, Vol. 2 | 1954-02-21 | live at Birdland; reissued on BLP 1521/22 |
| BLP 5039 | 1954 | Art Blakey Quintet | A Night at Birdland, Vol. 3 | 1954-02-21 | live at Birdland; reissued on BLP 1521/22 |
| BLP 5040 | 1954 | Miles Davis | Miles Davis, Vol. 3 | 1954-03-06 | reissued on BLP 1501/02 |
| BLP 5041 | 1954 | The Amazing Bud Powell | The Amazing Bud Powell, Vol. 2 | 1953-08-14 | reissued on BLP 1503/04 |
| BLP 5042 | 1954 | Tal Farlow Quartet | Tal Farlow Quartet | 4/11/54 | |
| BLP 5043 | 1954 | Frank Foster Quintet | New Faces – New Sounds | 5/5/54 | |
| BLP 5044 | 1954 | Elmo Hope Quintet | New Faces – New Sounds, Vol. 2 | 6/54 | |
| BLP 5045 | 1954 | George Wallington and His Band | George Wallington and His Band | 5/12/54 | |
| BLP 5046 | 1954 | Lionel Hampton | Jazztime Paris | 9/28/53 | |
| BLP 5047 | 1954 | Clifford Brown Quartet | Clifford Brown Quartet | 10/15/53 | |
| BLP 5048 | 1954 | Gigi Gryce / Clifford Brown Sextet | Gigi Gryce / Clifford Brown Sextet | 10/8/53 | |
| BLP 5049 | 1954 | Gigi Gryce / Clifford Brown | Jazztime Paris, Volume 1 | 9/26/53, 9/28/53, 9/29/53 10/9/53, 10/10/53, 10/11/53 | |
| BLP 5050 | 1954 | Gigi Gryce / Clifford Brown | Jazztime Paris, Volume 2 | 9/26/53, 9/28/53, 9/29/53 10/9/53, 10/10/53, 10/11/53 | |
| BLP 5051 | N/A | Gigi Gryce / Clifford Brown | Jazztime Paris, Volume 3 | 9/26/53, 9/28/53, 9/29/53 10/9/53, 10/10/53, 10/11/53 | |
| BLP 5052 | 1954 | The Cool Britons | New Sounds from Olde England | 5/13/54, 5/15/54 | |
| BLP 5053 | 1954 | Julius Watkins Sextet | New Faces – New Sounds | 8/54 | AKA Julius Watkins Sextet |
| BLP 5054 | 1954 | Gil Mellé Quartet | New Faces – New Sounds | 9/5/54 | AKA The Gil Mellé Quartet Volume 3 |
| BLP 5055 | 1954 | Lou Donaldson Sextet | Lou Donaldson Sextet, Volume 2 | 1954-08-22 | reissued on BLP 1537 |
| BLP 5056 | 1954 | Jutta Hipp Quintet | New Faces, New Sounds from Germany | 4/24/54 | |
| BLP 5057 | 1955 | The Eminent Jay Jay Johnson | The Eminent Jay Jay Johnson, Vol. 2 | 1954-09-24 | reissued on BLP 1505/06 |
| BLP 5058 | 1955 | Horace Silver Quintet | Horace Silver Quintet, Vol. 3 | 1954-11-13 | reissued on BLP 1518 |
| BLP 5059 | 1955 | Various artists | Best from the West, Volume 1 | 12/31/54, 1/55 | |
| BLP 5060 | 1955 | Various artists | Best from the West, Volume 2 | 12/31/54, 1/55 | |
| BLP 5061 | 1955 | The Swinging Fats Sadi Combo | The Swinging Fats Sadi Combo | 1954 | |
| BLP 5062 | 1955 | Horace Silver Quintet | Horace Silver Quintet, Vol. 4 | 1955-02-06 | reissued on BLP 1518 |
| BLP 5063 | 1955 | Gil Mellé Quintet | Five Impressions of Color | 2/27/55 | AKA Gil Mellé Quintet, Vol. 4 |
| BLP 5064 | 1955 | Julius Watkins Sextet | Julius Watkins Sextet, Volume 2 | 3/20/55 | |
| BLP 5065 | 1955 | Kenny Dorham Octet | Afro-Cuban | 1955-03-29 | reissued as BLP 1535 |
| BLP 5066 | 1955 | Hank Mobley Quartet | Hank Mobley Quartet | 1955-03-27 | |
| BLP 5067 | 1955 | Lou Mecca Quartet | Lou Mecca Quartet | 3/25/55 | |
| BLP 5068 | 1955 | The Prophetic Herbie Nichols | The Prophetic Herbie Nichols, Vol. 1 | 1955-05-06 | |
| BLP 5069 | 1955 | The Prophetic Herbie Nichols | The Prophetic Herbie Nichols, Vol. 2 | 1955-05-13 | |
| BLP 5070 | 1955 | The Eminent Jay Jay Johnson | The Eminent Jay Jay Johnson, Vol. 3 | 1955-06-06 | reissued on BLP 1505/06 |
| BN 5071 | 2014 | Miles Davis | Enigma | 1952-05-09, 1953-04-20 | |

=== Modern Jazz 1500 series ===
Blue Note made the switch to 12" albums late in 1955. The Modern Jazz Series (see the 5000 series below) continued with the following 12" LPs. Many of these were issued in both monaural versions (BLP series) and stereo versions (BST 81500 series), sometimes in electronically rechanneled stereo. In certain cases, the stereo versions of recordings from 1957 onwards only appeared many years later. Beginning in 1956 with BLP 1509, Reid Miles designed most of the Blue Note LP covers. The 1500 series has been systematically reissued by Toshiba-EMI in Japan ("Blue Note Works 1500" series, 20-bit 88.2 kHz CDs); the catalog numbers are TOCJ-1501, etc. In addition, originally unissued material from these dates was made available of Toshiba's 1600 series (20-bit 88.2 kHz CDs).

| Catalog number | Year | Artist | Title | Date recorded | Notes |
|---|---|---|---|---|---|
| BLP 1501 | 1956 | Miles Davis | Miles Davis, Volume 1 | 1952-05-09, 1953-04-20, 1954-03-06 | compiles BLP 5013, BLP 5022 & BLP 5040 |
| BLP 1502 | 1956 | Miles Davis | Miles Davis, Volume 2 | 1952-05-09, 1953-04-20, 1954-03-06 | compiles BLP 5013, BLP 5022 & BLP 5040 |
| BLP 1503 | 1956 | The Amazing Bud Powell | The Amazing Bud Powell, Volume 1 | 1949-08-08, 1951-05-01, 1953-08-14 | compiles BLP 5003 & BLP 5041 |
| BLP 1504 | 1956 | The Amazing Bud Powell | The Amazing Bud Powell, Volume 2 | 1949-08-08, 1951-05-01, 1953-08-14 | compiles BLP 5003 & BLP 5041 |
| BLP 1505 | 1956 | The Eminent Jay Jay Johnson | The Eminent Jay Jay Johnson, Volume 1 | 1953-06-22, 1954-09-24, 1955-06-06 | compiles BLP 5028, BLP 5057 & BLP 5070 |
| BLP 1506 | 1956 | The Eminent Jay Jay Johnson | The Eminent Jay Jay Johnson, Volume 2 | 1953-06-22, 1954-09-24, 1955-06-06 | compiles BLP 5028, BLP 5057 & BLP 5070 |
| BLP 1507 | 1956 | Art Blakey and the Jazz Messengers | At the Cafe Bohemia, Vol. 1 | 1955-11-23 | live at the Café Bohemia |
| BLP 1508 | 1956 | Art Blakey and the Jazz Messengers | At the Cafe Bohemia, Vol. 2 | 1955-11-23 | live at the Café Bohemia |
| BLP 1509 | 1956 | Milt Jackson | Milt Jackson and the Thelonious Monk Quintet | 1948-07-02, 1951-07-23, 1952-04-07 | reissue of BLP 5011 |
| BLP 1510 | 1956 | Thelonious Monk | Genius of Modern Music, Volume One | 1947-10-15, -24, -11-21, 1948-07-02, 1951-07-23, 1952-05-30 | compiles BLP 5002 & BLP 5009 |
| BLP 1511 | 1956 | Thelonious Monk | Genius of Modern Music, Volume Two | 1947-10-15, -24, -11-21, 1948-07-02, 1951-07-23, 1952-05-30 | compiles BLP 5002 & BLP 5009 |
| BLP 1512 | 1956 | Jimmy Smith at the Organ | A New Sound... A New Star..., Vol. 1 | 1956-02-18 | |
| BLP 1513 | 1956 | Thad Jones | Detroit–New York Junction | 1956-03-13 | |
| BLP 1514 | 1956 | Jimmy Smith at the Organ | A New Sound – A New Star, Vol. 2 | 1956-03-27 | |
| BLP 1515 | 1956 | Jutta Hipp | At the Hickory House, Volume 1 | 1956-04-05 | live |
| BLP 1516 | 1956 | Jutta Hipp | At the Hickory House, Volume 2 | 1956-04-05 | live |
| BLP 1517 | 1956 | Gil Mellé | Patterns in Jazz | 1956-04-01 | |
| BLP 1518 | 1956 | Horace Silver | Horace Silver and the Jazz Messengers | 1954-11-13, 1955-02-06 | compiles BLP 5058 & BLP 5062 |
| BLP 1519 | 1956 | Herbie Nichols Trio | Herbie Nichols Trio | 1955-08-01, -07, 1956-04-19 | |
| BLP 1520 | 1956 | Horace Silver Trio | Horace Silver Trio & Art Blakey–Sabu | 1952-10-09, -20, 1953-11-23 | compiles BLP 5018 & BLP 5034 |
| BLP 1521 | 1956 | Art Blakey Quintet | A Night at Birdland, Vol. 1 | 1954-02-21 | live at Birdland; compiles BLP 5037–39 |
| BLP 1522 | 1956 | Art Blakey Quintet | A Night at Birdland, Vol. 2 | 1954-02-21 | live at Birdland; compiles BLP 5037–39 |
| BLP 1523 | 1956 | Kenny Burrell | Introducing Kenny Burrell | 1956-05-29, -30 | |
| BLP 1524 | 1956 | Kenny Dorham | 'Round About Midnight at the Cafe Bohemia | 1956-05-31 | live at the Café Bohemia |
| BLP 1525 | 1956 | The Incredible Jimmy Smith | Jimmy Smith at the Organ | 1956-06-17, -18 | AKA The Incredible Jimmy Smith, Vol. 3 |
| BLP 1526 | 1956 | Clifford Brown | Memorial Album | 1953-06-09, -08-28 | compiles BLP 5030 & BLP 5032 |
| BLP 1527 | 1956 | The Magnificent Thad Jones | The Magnificent Thad Jones | 1956-07-14 | |
| BLP 1528 | 1956 | The Incredible Jimmy Smith | At Club "Baby Grand" Wilmington, Delaware, Volume 1 | 1956-08-04 | live |
| BLP 1529 | 1956 | The Incredible Jimmy Smith | At Club "Baby Grand" Wilmington, Delaware, Volume 2 | 1956-08-04 | live |
| BLP 1530 | 1957 | Jutta Hipp | Jutta Hipp with Zoot Sims | 1956-07-28 | |
| BLP 1531 | | Fats Navarro | The Fabulous Fats Navarro, Volume 1 | 9/26/47, 9/13/48, 10/11/48, 8/9/49 | |
| BLP 1532 | | Fats Navarro | The Fabulous Fats Navarro, Volume 2 | 9/26/47, 9/13/48, 10/11/48, 8/9/49 | |
| BLP 1533 | 1957 | Johnny Griffin | Introducing Johnny Griffin | 1956-04-17 | |
| BLP 1534 | 1957 | Paul Chambers | Whims of Chambers | 1956-09-21 | |
| BLP 1535 | 1957 | Kenny Dorham | Afro-Cuban | 1955-01-30, -03-29 | reissue of BLP 5065 |
| BLP 1536 | 1957 | J. R. Monterose | J. R. Monterose | 1956-10-21 | |
| BLP 1537 | 1957 | Lou Donaldson | Quartet/Quintet/Sextet | 1952-06-20, -11-19, 1954-08-22 | compiles BLP 5021 & BLP 5055 |
| BLP 1538 | 1956 | Lee Morgan | Lee Morgan Indeed! | 1956-11-04 | |
| BLP 1539 | 1956 | Horace Silver Quintet | 6 Pieces of Silver | 1956-11-10 | |
| BLP 1540 | 1957 | Hank Mobley Sextet | Hank Mobley with Donald Byrd and Lee Morgan | 1956-11-25 | AKA Hank Mobley Sextet |
| BLP 1541 | 1957 | Lee Morgan Sextet | Lee Morgan, Volume 2 | 1956-12-02 | |
| BLP 1542 | 1957 | Sonny Rollins | Sonny Rollins, Volume 1 | 1956-12-16 | |
| BLP 1543 | 1957 | Kenny Burrell | Kenny Burrell, Volume 2 | 1956-03-12, -05-29, -30, -31 | |
| BLP 1544 | 1957 | Hank Mobley | Hank Mobley and His All Stars | 1957-01-13 | |
| BLP 1545 | 1957 | Lou Donaldson Quintet | Wailing with Lou | 1957-01-27 | |
| BLP 1546 | | Thad Jones | The Magnificent Thad Jones, Volume 3 | 7/14/56, 2/2/57 | |
| BLP 1547 | 1957 | Jimmy Smith | A Date with Jimmy Smith, Volume One | 1957-02-11, -12, -13 | |
| BLP 1548 | 1957 | Jimmy Smith | A Date with Jimmy Smith, Volume Two | 1957-02-11, -12, -13 | |
| BLP 1549 | 1957 | Cliff Jordan/John Gilmore | Blowing In from Chicago | 1957-03-03 | |
| BLP 1550 | 1957 | Hank Mobley Quintet | Hank Mobley with Farmer, Silver, Watkins, Blakey | 1957-03-08 | AKA Hank Mobley Quintet |
| BLP 1551 | 1957 | The Incredible Jimmy Smith | Jimmy Smith at the Organ, Volume 1 | 1957-02-12, -13 | |
| BLP 1552 | 1957 | The Incredible Jimmy Smith | Jimmy Smith at the Organ, Volume 2 | 1957-02-12, -13 | |
| BLP 1553 | N/A | UNUSED | UNUSED | UNUSED | |
| BLP 1554 | 1957 | Art Blakey | Orgy in Rhythm, Volume 1 | 1957-03-07 | |
| BLP 1555 | 1957 | Art Blakey | Orgy in Rhythm, Volume 2 | 1957-03-07 | |
| BLP 1556 | 1957 | The Incredible Jimmy Smith | The Sounds of Jimmy Smith | 1957-02-11, -12, -13 | |
| BLP 1557 | 1957 | Lee Morgan | Lee Morgan, Vol. 3 | 1957-03-24 | |
| BLP 1558 | 1957 | Sonny Rollins | Sonny Rollins, Vol. 2 | 1957-04-14 | |
| BLP 1559 | 1957 | Johnny Griffin | Johnny Griffin, Vol. 2 | 1957-04-08 | AKA A Blowing Session |
| BLP 1560 | 1957 | Hank Mobley Sextet | Hank | 1957-04-21 | |
| BLP 1561 | 1957 | Sabu | Palo Congo | 1957-04-27 | |
| BLP 1562 | 1957 | Horace Silver Quintet | The Stylings of Silver | 1957-05-08 | |
| BLP 1563 | 1957 | Jimmy Smith | Plays Pretty Just for You | 1957-05-08 | |
| BLP 1564 | 1958 | Paul Chambers Quintet | Paul Chambers Quintet | 1957-05-19 | |
| BLP 1565 | 1957 | Cliff Jordan | Cliff Jordan | 1957-06-02 | |
| BLP 1566 | 1957 | Lou Donaldson Quintet | Swing and Soul | 1957-06-09 | |
| BLP 1567 | 1957 | Curtis Fuller | The Opener | 1957-06-16 | |
| BLP 1568 | 1958 | Hank Mobley | Hank Mobley | 1957-06-23 | |
| BLP 1569 | 1957 | Paul Chambers | Bass on Top | 1957-07-14 | |
| BLP 1570 | 1957 | Sonny Clark | Dial "S" for Sonny | 1957-07-21 | |
| BLP 1571 | 1957 | The Amazing Bud Powell | Bud! | 1957-08-03 | AKA The Amazing Bud Powell, Volume 3 |
| BLP 1572 | 1958 | Curtis Fuller | Bone & Bari | 1957-08-04 | |
| BLP 1573 | 1957 | John Jenkins with Kenny Burrell | John Jenkins with Kenny Burrell | 1957-08-11 | |
| BLP 1574 | 1959 | Hank Mobley–Lee Morgan | Peckin' Time | 1958-02-09 | |
| BLP 1575 | 1958 | Lee Morgan | City Lights | 1957-08-25 | |
| BLP 1576 | 1958 | Sonny Clark | Sonny's Crib | 1957-09-01 | |
| BLP 1577 | 1958 | John Coltrane | Blue Train | 1957-09-15 | |
| BLP 1578 | 1958 | Lee Morgan | The Cooker | 1957-09-29 | |
| BLP 1579 | 1958 | Sonny Clark | Sonny Clark Trio | 1957-10-13 | |
| BLP 1580 | 1958 | Johnny Griffin | The Congregation | 1957-10-23 | |
| BLP 1581 | 1958 | Sonny Rollins | A Night at the "Village Vanguard" | 1957-11-03 | live |
| BLP 1582 | 1958 | Clifford Jordan | Cliff Craft | 1957-11-10 | |
| BLP 1583 | 1960 | Curtis Fuller | Curtis Fuller, Volume 3 | 1957-12-01 | |
| BLP 1584 | 1958 | Louis Smith | Here Comes Louis Smith | 1958-02-04, -09 | |
| BLP 1585 | 1958 | Jimmy Smith | Groovin' at Smalls' Paradise, Volume 1 | 1957-11-15 | live |
| BLP 1586 | 1958 | Jimmy Smith | Groovin' at Smalls' Paradise, Volume 2 | 1957-11-15 | live |
| BLP 1587 | 1958 | Bennie Green | Back on the Scene | 1958-03-23 | |
| BLP 1588 | 1958 | Sonny Clark | Cool Struttin' | 1958-01-05 | |
| BLP 1589 | 1958 | Horace Silver Quintet | Further Explorations | 1958-01-13 | |
| BLP 1590 | 1958 | Lee Morgan | Candy | 1957-11-18, 1958-02-02 | |
| BLP 1591 | 1958 | Lou Donaldson | Lou Takes Off | 1957-12-15 | |
| BLP 1592 | N/A | Sonny Clark | Unissued | 1957-12-08 | |
| BLP 1593 | 1958 | Lou Donaldson | Blues Walk | 1958-07-28 | |
| BLP 1594 | 1958 | Louis Smith | Smithville | 1958-03-30 | |
| BLP 1595 | 1958 | Cannonball Adderley | Somethin' Else | 1958-03-09 | |
| BLP 1596 | 1958 | Kenny Burrell | Blue Lights, Volume 1 | 1958-05-14 | |
| BLP 1597 | 1958 | Kenny Burrell | Blue Lights, Volume 2 | 1958-05-14 | |
| BLP 1598 | 1958 | The Amazing Bud Powell | Time Waits | 1958-05-24 | AKA The Amazing Bud Powell, Volume 4 |
| BLP 1599 | 1958 | Bennie Green | Soul Stirrin' | 1958-04-28 | |
| BLP 1600 | 1958 | The 3 Sounds | Introducing the 3 Sounds | 1958-09-16, -18 | |

=== Modern Jazz 4000 series ===
The Modern Jazz Series continued into the 1970s with the LPs listed below. Many were issued in both monaural versions (BLP series) and stereo versions (BST 84000 series). Beginning with 4258 all subsequent LPs (with three exceptions: 4263, 4264, and 4265) were issued only in stereo. Most of the first 300 numbers of the 4000 series have been reissued by Toshiba-EMI in Japan ("Blue Note Works 4000" series); the catalog numbers are TOCJ-4###.

==== 4000 series ====
| Catalog number | Year | Artist | Title | Date recorded | Notes |
|---|---|---|---|---|---|
| BLP 4001 | 1959 | Sonny Rollins | Newk's Time | 1957-09-22 | |
| BLP 4002 | 1958 | Jimmy Smith | House Party | 1957-08-25, 1958-02-25 | |
| BLP 4003 | 1958 | Art Blakey and the Jazz Messengers | Art Blakey and the Jazz Messengers | 1958-10-30 | AKA Moanin' |
| BLP 4004 | 1959 | Art Blakey | Holiday for Skins, Volume 1 | 1958-11-09 | |
| BLP 4005 | 1959 | Art Blakey | Holiday for Skins, Volume 2 | 1958-11-09 | |
| BLP 4006 | 1959 | Dizzy Reece | Blues in Trinity | 1958-08-24 | |
| BLP 4007 | 1959 | Donald Byrd | Off to the Races | 1958-12-21 | |
| BLP 4008 | 1959 | The Horace Silver Quintet | Finger Poppin' with the Horace Silver Quintet | 1959-01-31 | |
| BLP 4009 | 1959 | The Amazing Bud Powell | The Scene Changes | 1956-12-29 | AKA The Amazing Bud Powell, Vol. 5 |
| BLP 4010 | 1959 | Bennie Green | Walkin' & Talkin' | 1959-01-25 | |
| BLP 4011 | 1959 | Jimmy Smith | The Sermon! | 1957-08-25, 1958-02-25 | |
| BLP 4012 | 1959 | Lou Donaldson with the 3 Sounds | LD+3 | 1959-02-18 | |
| BLP 4013 | 1959 | Jackie McLean | New Soil | 1959-05-02 | |
| BLP 4014 | 1959 | The 3 Sounds | Bottoms Up! | 1958-09-16, -28, 1959-02-11 | |
| BLP 4015 | 1959 | Art Blakey & the Jazz Messengers | At the Jazz Corner of the World, Vol. 1 | 1959-04-15 | live at Birdland |
| BLP 4016 | 1959 | Art Blakey & the Jazz Messengers | At the Jazz Corner of the World, Vol. 2 | 1959-04-15 | live at Birdland |
| BLP 4017 | 1959 | The Horace Silver Quintet & Trio | Blowin' the Blues Away | 1959-08-29, -30, 1959-09-13 | |
| BLP 4018 | 1960 | Walter Davis Jr. | Davis Cup | 1959-08-02 | |
| BLP 4019 | 1959 | Donald Byrd | Byrd in Hand | 1959-05-31 | |
| BLP 4020 | 1960 | The 3 Sounds | Good Deal | 1959-05-20 | |
| BLP 4021 | 1959 | Kenny Burrell with Art Blakey | On View at the Five Spot Cafe | 1959-08-25 | live at the Five Spot Café |
| BLP 4022 | 1960 | Duke Pearson | Profile | 1959-10-25 | |
| BLP 4023 | 1960 | Dizzy Reece | Star Bright | 1959-11-19 | |
| BLP 4024 | 1960 | Jackie McLean | Swing, Swang, Swingin' | 1959-10-20 | |
| BLP 4025 | 1960 | Lou Donaldson | The Time Is Right | 1959-10-31, -11-28 | |
| BLP 4026 | 1960 | Donald Byrd | Fuego | 1959-10-04 | |
| BLP 4027 | 1960 | Freddie Redd | The Music from "The Connection" | 1960-02-15 | soundtrack for The Connection |
| BLP 4028 | 1960 | Horace Parlan | Movin' & Groovin' | 1960-02-29 | |
| BLP 4029 | 1960 | Art Blakey & the Jazz Messengers | The Big Beat | 1960-03-06 | |
| BLP 4030 | 1960 | The Incredible Jimmy Smith | Crazy! Baby | 1960-01-04 | |
| BLP 4031 | 1960 | Hank Mobley | Soul Station | 1960-02-07 | |
| BLP 4032 | 1960 | Sonny Red | Out of the Blue | 1956-12-05, 1960-01-23 | |
| BLP 4033 | 1960 | Dizzy Reece | Soundin' Off | 1960-05-12 | |
| BLP 4034 | 1961 | Lee Morgan | Lee-Way | 1960-04-28 | |
| BLP 4035 | | Duke Pearson | Tender Feelin's | 12/16/59 | |
| BLP 4036 | | Lou Donaldson | Sunny Side Up | 2/5/60, 2/28/60 | |
| BLP 4037 | | Horace Parlan | Us Three | 4/20/60 | |
| BLP 4038 | | Jackie McLean | Capuchin Swing | 4/17/60 | |
| BLP 4039 | | Stanley Turrentine | Look Out! | 6/18/60 | |
| BLP 4040 | | Freddie Hubbard | Open Sesame | 6/19/60 | |
| BLP 4041 | | Tina Brooks | True Blue | 6/25/60 | |
| BLP 4042 | | Horace Silver Quintet | Horace-Scope | 7/8/60, 7/9/60 | |
| BLP 4043 | | Horace Parlan | Speakin' My Piece | 7/14/60 | |
| BLP 4044 | | The 3 Sounds | Moods | 6/28/60 | |
| BLP 4045 | | Freddie Redd | Shades of Redd | 8/13/60 | |
| BLP 4046 | | Duke Jordan | Flight to Jordan | 8/4/60 | |
| BLP 4047 | | Art Taylor | A.T.'s Delight | 8/6/60 | |
| BLP 4048 | | Donald Byrd | Byrd in Flight | 1/17/60, 1/25/60, 7/10/60 | |
| BLP 4049 | | Art Blakey and the Jazz Messengers | A Night in Tunisia | 8/14/60 | |
| BLP 4050 | | Jimmy Smith | Home Cookin' | 5/24/59, 6/16/59 | |
| BLP 4051 | | Jackie McLean | Jackie's Bag | 1/18/59 | |
| BLP 4052 | | Tina Brooks | Back to the Tracks | 9/1/60, 10/20/60 | |
| BLP 4053 | | Lou Donaldson | Light-Foot | 12/14/58 | |
| BLP 4054 | 1961 | Art Blakey & the Jazz Messengers | Meet You at the Jazz Corner of the World, Volume 1 | 1960-09-14 | live at Birdland |
| BLP 4055 | 1961 | Art Blakey & the Jazz Messengers | Meet You at the Jazz Corner of the World, Volume 2 | 1960-09-14 | live at Birdland |
| BLP 4056 | | Freddie Hubbard | Goin' Up | 11/6/60 | |
| BLP 4057 | | Stanley Turrentine with The 3 Sounds | Blue Hour | 12/16/60 | |
| BLP 4058 | | Hank Mobley | Roll Call | 11/13/60 | |
| BLP 4059 | | Kenny Drew | Undercurrent | 12/11/60 | |
| BLP 4060 | 1961 | Donald Byrd | At the Half Note Cafe, Volume 1 | 1960-11-11 | live at the Half Note Cafe |
| BLP 4061 | 1961 | Donald Byrd | At the Half Note Cafe, Volume 2 | 1960-11-11 | live at the Half Note Cafe |
| BLP 4062 | | Horace Parlan | Headin' South | 12/6/60 | |
| BLP 4063 | | Kenny Dorham | Whistle Stop | 1/15/61 | |
| BLP 4064 | | Grant Green | Grant's First Stand | 1/28/61 | |
| BLP 4065 | | Stanley Turrentine | Comin' Your Way | 1/20/61 | |
| BLP 4066 | | Lou Donaldson | Here 'Tis | 1/23/61 | |
| BLP 4067 | | Jackie McLean | Bluesnik | 1/8/61 | |
| BLP 4068 | | Baby Face Willette | Face to Face | 1/30/61 | |
| BLP 4069 | | Stanley Turrentine | Up at "Minton's", Volume 1 | 2/23/61 | live |
| BLP 4070 | | Stanley Turrentine | Up at "Minton's", Volume 2 | 2/23/61 | live |
| BLP 4071 | | Grant Green | Green Street | 4/1/61 | |
| BLP 4072 | | The 3 Sounds | Feelin' Good | 6/28/60 | |
| BLP 4073 | | Freddie Hubbard | Hub Cap | 4/9/61 | |
| BLP 4074 | | Horace Parlan | On the Spur of the Moment | 3/18/61 | |
| BLP 4075 | | Donald Byrd | The Cat Walk | 5/2/61 | |
| BLP 4076 | | Horace Silver Quintet | Doin' the Thing | 5/19/61, 5/20/61 | |
| BLP 4077 | | Dexter Gordon | Doin' Allright | 5/6/61 | |
| BLP 4078 | | Jimmy Smith | Midnight Special | 4/25/60 | |
| BLP 4079 | | Lou Donaldson | Gravy Train | 4/27/61 | |
| BLP 4080 | | Hank Mobley | Workout | 3/26/61 | |
| BLP 4081 | | Stanley Turrentine | Dearly Beloved | 6/8/61 | |
| BLP 4082 | | Horace Parlan | Up & Down | 6/18/61 | |
| BLP 4083 | | Dexter Gordon | Dexter Calling... | 5/9/61 | |
| BLP 4084 | | Baby Face Willette | Stop and Listen | 5/22/61 | |
| BLP 4085 | | Freddie Hubbard | Ready for Freddie | 8/21/61 | |
| BLP 4086 | | Grant Green | Grantstand | 8/1/61 | |
| BLP 4087 | | Leo Parker | Let Me Tell You 'bout It | 9/9/61 | |
| BLP 4088 | | The 3 Sounds | Here We Come | 12/13/60, 12/14/60 | |
| BLP 4089 | | Jackie McLean | A Fickle Sonance | 10/26/61 | |
| BLP 4090 | 1962 | Art Blakey & the Jazz Messengers | Mosaic | 1961-10-02 | |
| BLP 4091 | | Sonny Clark | Leapin' and Lopin' | 11/13/61 | |
| BLP 4092 | | Kenny Clarke | The Golden 8 | 5/18/61, 5/19/61 | |
| BLP 4093 | | Ike Quebec | Heavy Soul | 11/26/61 | |
| BLP 4094 | | Fred Jackson | Hootin' 'n Tootin' | 2/5/62 | |
| BLP 4095 | | Leo Parker | Rollin' with Leo | 10/12/61, 10/20/61 | unreleased; issued as LT-1076 |
| BLP 4096 | | Stanley Turrentine | That's Where It's At | 1/2/62 | |
| BLP 4097 | 1962 | Art Blakey and the Afro-Drum Ensemble | The African Beat | 1962-01-24 | |
| BLP 4098 | 1962 | Ike Quebec | Blue & Sentimental | 1961-12-16, -23 | |
| BLP 4099 | 1962 | Grant Green | Sunday Mornin' | 1961-06-04 | |
| BLP 4100 | 1962 | Jimmy Smith | Plays Fats Waller | 1962-01-23 | |

==== 4100 series ====
| Catalog number | Year | Artist | Title | Date recorded | Notes |
|---|---|---|---|---|---|
| BLP 4101 | 1962 | Donald Byrd | Royal Flush | 1961-09-21 | |
| BLP 4102 | 1962 | The 3 Sounds | Hey There | 8/13/61 | |
| BLP 4103 | N/A | Ike Quebec | Easy Living | 1/20/62 | Unissued; released as Congo Lament (1981) |
| BLP 4104 | 1963 | Art Blakey | Buhaina's Delight | 11/28/61, 12/18/61 | |
| BLP 4105 | | Ike Quebec | It Might as Well Be Spring | 12/9/61 | |
| BLP 4106 | | Jackie McLean | Let Freedom Ring | 3/19/62 | |
| BLP 4107 | | Don Wilkerson | Preach Brother! | 6/18/62 | |
| BLP 4108 | | Lou Donaldson | The Natural Soul | 5/9/62 | |
| BLP 4109 | | Herbie Hancock | Takin' Off | 5/28/62 | |
| BLP 4110 | | Horace Silver | The Tokyo Blues | 7/13/62, 7/14/62 | |
| BLP 4111 | | Grant Green | The Latin Bit | 4/26/62 | |
| BLP 4112 | | Dexter Gordon | Go! | 8/27/62 | |
| BLP 4113 | | Freddie Roach | Down to Earth | 8/23/62 | |
| BLP 4114 | | Ike Quebec | Soul Samba | 10/5/62 | |
| BLP 4115 | | Freddie Hubbard | Hub-Tones | 10/10/62 | |
| BLP 4116 | N/A | Jackie McLean | Jackie McLean Quintet | 6/14/62 | Unissued; released as Vertigo (1980) |
| BLP 4117 | | Jimmy Smith | Back at the Chicken Shack | 4/25/60 | |
| BLP 4118 | | Donald Byrd | Free Form | 12/11/61 | |
| BLP 4119 | | Charlie Rouse | Bossa Nova Bacchanal | 11/26/62 | |
| BLP 4120 | | The 3 Sounds | It Just Got to Be | 12/13/60, 12/14/60 | |
| BLP 4121 | | Don Wilkerson | Elder Don | 5/3/62 | |
| BLP 4122 | | Stanley Turrentine | Jubilee Shout!!! | 10/18/62 | |
| BLP 4123 | | Kenny Burrell | Midnight Blue | 1/8/63 | |
| BLP 4124 | | Donald Byrd | A New Perspective | 1/12/63 | |
| BLP 4125 | | Lou Donaldson | Good Gracious! | 1/24/63 | |
| BLP 4126 | | Herbie Hancock | My Point of View | 3/19/63 | |
| BLP 4127 | | Kenny Dorham | Una Mas | 4/1/63 | |
| BLP 4128 | | Freddie Roach | Mo' Greens Please | 1/21/63, 3/11/63 | |
| BLP 4129 | | Stanley Turrentine | Never Let Me Go | 2/13/63 | |
| BLP 4130 | | Big John Patton | Along Came John | 4/5/63 | |
| BLP 4131 | | Horace Silver | Silver's Serenade | 5/7/63, 5/8/63 | |
| BLP 4132 | | Grant Green | Feelin' the Spirit | 12/21/62 | |
| BLP 4133 | | Dexter Gordon | A Swingin' Affair | 8/29/62 | |
| BLP 4134 | | Horace Parlan | Happy Frame of Mind | 2/15/63 | |
| BLP 4135 | | Freddie Hubbard | Here to Stay | 12/27/62 | |
| BLP 4136 | | Solomon Ilori | African High Life | 4/25/63 | |
| BLP 4137 | | Jackie McLean | One Step Beyond | 4/30/63 | |
| BLP 4138 | | Harold Vick | Steppin' Out! | 5/27/63 | |
| BLP 4139 | | Grant Green | Am I Blue | 5/16/63 | |
| BLP 4140 | | Joe Henderson | Page One | 6/3/63 | |
| BLP 4141 | | Jimmy Smith | Rockin' the Boat | 2/7/63 | |
| BLP 4142 | N/A | Blue Mitchell | Step Lightly | 8/13/63 | |
| BLP 4143 | | John Patton | Blue John | 7/11/63, 8/2/63 | |
| BLP 4144 | | Johnny Coles | Little Johnny C | 7/18/63, 8/9/63 | |
| BLP 4145 | | Don Wilkerson | Shoutin' | 7/29/63 | |
| BLP 4146 | | Dexter Gordon | Our Man in Paris | 5/23/63 | |
| BLP 4147 | | Herbie Hancock | Inventions and Dimensions | 8/30/63 | |
| BLP 4148 | | George Braith | Two Souls in One | 9/4/63 | |
| BLP 4149 | | Hank Mobley | No Room for Squares | 3/7/63, 10/2/63 | |
| BLP 4150 | | Stanley Turrentine | A Chip off the Old Block | 10/21/63 | |
| BLP 4151 | | Andrew Hill | Black Fire | 11/9/63 | |
| BLP 4152 | | Joe Henderson | Our Thing | 9/9/63 | |
| BLP 4153 | | Grachan Moncur III | Evolution | 11/21/63 | |
| BLP 4154 | | Grant Green | Idle Moments | 11/15/63 | |
| BLP 4155 | | The 3 Sounds | Black Orchid | 3/7/62, 3/8/62 | |
| BLP 4156 | | Art Blakey and the Jazz Messengers | The Freedom Rider | 5/27/61 | |
| BLP 4157 | | Lee Morgan | The Sidewinder | 12/21/63 | |
| BLP 4158 | | Freddie Roach | Good Move! | 11/29/63, 12/9/63 | |
| BLP 4159 | | Andrew Hill | Judgment! | 1/8/64 | |
| BLP 4160 | | Andrew Hill | Smokestack | 12/13/63 | |
| BLP 4161 | | George Braith | Soulstream | 12/16/63 | |
| BLP 4162 | | Stanley Turrentine | Hustlin' | 1/24/64 | |
| BLP 4163 | | Eric Dolphy | Out to Lunch! | 2/25/64 | |
| BLP 4164 | | Jimmy Smith | Prayer Meetin' | 2/8/63 | |
| BLP 4165 | | Jackie McLean | Destination... Out! | 9/20/63 | |
| BLP 4166 | | Joe Henderson | In 'n Out | 4/10/64 | |
| BLP 4167 | | Andrew Hill | Point of Departure | 3/21/64 | |
| BLP 4168 | | Freddie Roach | Brown Sugar | 3/18/64, 3/19/64 | |
| BLP 4169 | | Lee Morgan | Search for the New Land | 2/15/64 | |
| BLP 4170 | | Art Blakey and the Jazz Messengers | Free for All | 2/10/64 | |
| BLP 4171 | | George Braith | Extension | 3/27/64 | |
| BLP 4172 | | Freddie Hubbard | Breaking Point | 5/7/64 | |
| BLP 4173 | | Wayne Shorter | Night Dreamer | 4/29/64 | |
| BLP 4174 | | Big John Patton | The Way I Feel | 6/19/64 | |
| BLP 4175 | | Herbie Hancock | Empyrean Isles | 6/17/64 | |
| BLP 4176 | | Dexter Gordon | One Flight Up | 6/2/64 | |
| BLP 4177 | | Grachan Moncur III | Some Other Stuff | 7/6/64 | |
| BLP 4178 | | Blue Mitchell | The Thing to Do | 7/30/64 | |
| BLP 4179 | | Jackie McLean | It's Time! | 8/5/64 | |
| BLP 4180 | | Anthony Williams | Life Time | 8/21/64, 8/24/64 | |
| BLP 4181 | | Kenny Dorham | Trompeta Toccata | 9/14/64 | |
| BLP 4182 | | Wayne Shorter | Juju | 8/3/64 | |
| BLP 4183 | | Grant Green | Talkin' About! | 9/11/64 | |
| BLP 4184 | | Sam Rivers | Fuchsia Swing Song | 12/11/64 | |
| BLP 4185 | | Horace Silver | Song for My Father | 10/31/63, 10/26/64 | |
| BLP 4186 | | Hank Mobley | The Turnaround | 3/7/63, 2/5/65 | |
| BLP 4187 | | Larry Young | Into Somethin' | 11/12/64 | |
| BLP 4188 | | Donald Byrd | I'm Tryin' to Get Home | 12/17/64, 12/18/64 | |
| BLP 4189 | | Joe Henderson | Inner Urge | 11/30/64 | |
| BLP 4190 | | Freddie Roach | All That's Good | 10/16/64 | |
| BLP 4191 | | Duke Pearson | Wahoo! | 11/21/64 | |
| BLP 4192 | | Big John Patton | Oh Baby! | 3/8/65 | |
| BLP 4193 | | Art Blakey & the Jazz Messengers | Indestructible | 4/24/64, 5/15/64 | |
| BLP 4194 | | Wayne Shorter | Speak No Evil | 12/24/64 | |
| BLP 4195 | | Herbie Hancock | Maiden Voyage | 3/17/65 | |
| BLP 4196 | | Freddie Hubbard | Blue Spirits | 2/19/65 | |
| BLP 4197 | | The 3 Sounds | Out of This World | 2/4/62, 3/7/62, 3/8/62 | |
| BLP 4198 | | Bobby Hutcherson | Dialogue | 4/3/65 | |
| BLP 4199 | | Lee Morgan | The Rumproller | 4/21/65 | |
| BLP 4200 | | Jimmy Smith | Softly as a Summer Breeze | 2/28/58 | |

==== 4200 series ====
| Catalog number | Year | Artist | Title | Date recorded | Notes |
|---|---|---|---|---|---|
| BLP 4201 | | Stanley Turrentine | Joyride | 4/14/65 | |
| BLP 4202 | | Grant Green | I Want to Hold Your Hand | 3/31/65 | |
| BLP 4203 | | Andrew Hill | Andrew!!! | 6/25/64 | |
| BLP 4204 | | Dexter Gordon | Gettin' Around | 5/28/65, 5/29/65 | |
| BLP 4205 | | Pete La Roca | Basra | 5/19/65 | |
| BLP 4206 | | Sam Rivers | Contours | 5/21/65 | |
| BLP 4207 | | Freddie Hubbard | The Night of the Cookers, Volume 1 | 4/9/65, 4/10/65 | |
| BLP 4208 | | Freddie Hubbard | The Night of the Cookers, Volume 2 | 4/9/65 | |
| BLP 4209 | | Hank Mobley | Dippin' | 6/18/65 | |
| BLP 4210 | N/A | Ornette Coleman | Town Hall Concert, Volume 1 | 1962-12-21 | live; unreleased |
| BLP 4211 | N/A | Ornette Coleman | Town Hall Concert, Volume 2 | 1962-12-21 | live; unreleased; issued on ESP-Disk as Town Hall, 1962 (1965) without "Taurus" |
| BLP 4212 | | Lee Morgan | The Gigolo | 6/25/65, 7/1/65 | |
| BLP 4213 | | Bobby Hutcherson | Components | 6/10/65 | |
| BLP 4214 | | Blue Mitchell | Down with It! | 7/14/65 | |
| BLP 4215 | | Jackie McLean | Right Now! | 1/29/65 | |
| BLP 4216 | | Anthony Williams | Spring | 8/12/65 | |
| BLP 4217 | | Andrew Hill | Compulsion | 10/8/65 | |
| BLP 4218 | | Jackie McLean | Action Action Action | 9/16/64 | |
| BLP 4219 | | Wayne Shorter | The All Seeing Eye | 10/15/65 | |
| BLP 4220 | | Horace Silver | The Cape Verdean Blues | 10/1/65 | |
| BLP 4221 | | Larry Young | Unity | 11/10/65 | |
| BLP 4222 | | Lee Morgan | Cornbread | 9/18/65 | |
| BLP 4223 | | Jackie McLean | Jacknife | 9/24/65 | |
| BLP 4224 | | Ornette Coleman | At the "Golden Circle", Volume 1 | 12/3/65, 12/4/65 | |
| BLP 4225 | | Ornette Coleman | At the "Golden Circle", Volume 2 | 12/3/65, 12/4/65 | |
| BLP 4226 | | Don Cherry | Complete Communion | 12/24/65 | |
| BLP 4227 | | Joe Henderson | Mode for Joe | 1/27/66 | |
| BLP 4228 | | Blue Mitchell | Bring It Home to Me | 1/6/66 | |
| BLP 4229 | | John Patton | Got a Good Thing Goin' | 4/29/66 | |
| BLP 4230 | | Hank Mobley | A Caddy for Daddy | 12/18/65 | |
| BLP 4231 | | Bobby Hutcherson | Happenings | 2/8/66 | |
| BLP 4232 | | Wayne Shorter | Adam's Apple | 2/3/66, 2/24/66 | |
| BLP 4233 | | Andrew Hill | Change | 3/7/66 | |
| BLP 4234 | | Stanley Turrentine | In Memory Of | 6/3/64, 9/4/64 | |
| BLP 4235 | | Jimmy Smith | Bucket! | 2/1/63 | |
| BLP 4236 | | Jackie McLean | Jacknife | 4/18/66 | |
| BLP 4237 | | Cecil Taylor | Unit Structures | 5/19/66 | |
| BLP 4238 | | Donald Byrd | Mustang! | 6/24/66 | |
| BLP 4239 | | John Patton | Let 'Em Roll | 12/11/65 | |
| BLP 4240 | | Stanley Turrentine | Rough 'n' Tumble | 7/1/66 | |
| BLP 4241 | | Hank Mobley | A Slice of the Top | 3/18/66, 6/17/66 | |
| BLP 4242 | | Larry Young | Of Love and Peace | 7/28/66 | |
| BLP 4243 | | Lee Morgan | Delightfulee | 4/8/66, 5/27/66 | |
| BLP 4244 | | Bobby Hutcherson | Stick-Up! | 7/14/66 | |
| BLP 4245 | | Art Blakey | Like Someone in Love | 8/7/60, 8/14/60 | |
| BLP 4246 | | Ornette Coleman | The Empty Foxhole | 9/9/66 | |
| BLP 4247 | | Don Cherry | Symphony for Improvisers | 9/19/66 | |
| BLP 4248 | | The 3 Sounds | Vibrations | 10/25/66 | |
| BLP 4249 | | Sam Rivers | A New Conception | 10/11/66 | |
| BLP 4250 | | Horace Silver | The Jody Grind | 11/2/66, 11/23/66 | |
| BLP 4251 | | Jack Wilson | Something Personal | 8/9/66, 8/10/66 | |
| BLP 4252 | | Duke Pearson | Sweet Honey Bee | 12/7/66 | |
| BLP 4253 | | Grant Green | Street of Dreams | 11/16/64 | |
| BLP 4254 | | Lou Donaldson | Lush Life | 1/20/67 | |
| BLP 4255 | | Jimmy Smith | I'm Movin' On | 1/31/63 | |
| BLP 4256 | | Stanley Turrentine | The Spoiler | 9/22/66 | |
| BLP 4257 | | Blue Mitchell | Boss Horn | 11/17/66 | |
| BST 84258 | | Art Blakey and the Jazz Messengers | The Witch Doctor | 3/14/61 | |
| BST 84259 | | Donald Byrd | Blackjack | 1/9/67 | |
| BST 84260 | | Cecil Taylor | Conquistador! | 10/6/66 | |
| BST 84261 | | Sam Rivers | Dimensions & Extensions | 3/17/67 | |
| BST 84262 | | Jackie McLean | New and Old Gospel | 3/24/67 | |
| BLP 4263 | | Lou Donaldson | Alligator Bogaloo | 4/7/67 | |
| BLP 4264 | | McCoy Tyner | The Real McCoy | 4/21/67 | |
| BLP 4265 | | The 3 Sounds | Live at the Lighthouse | 6/9/67, 6/10/67 | |
| BST 84266 | | Larry Young | Contrasts | 9/18/67 | |
| BST 84267 | | Duke Pearson | The Right Touch | 9/13/67 | |
| BLP 4268 | | Stanley Turrentine | Easy Walker | 7/8/66 | |
| BST 84269 | | Jimmy Smith | Open House | 3/22/60 | |
| BST 84270 | | Jack Wilson | Easterly Winds | 9/22/67 | |
| BST 84271 | | Lou Donaldson | Mr. Shing-a-Ling | 10/27/67 | |
| BST 84272 | 1968 | Blue Mitchell | Heads Up! | 11/17/67 | |
| BST 84273 | 1968 | Hank Mobley | Hi Voltage | 10/9/67 | |
| BST 84274 | 1968 | Tyrone Washington | Natural Essence | 12/29/67 | |
| BST 84275 | 1968 | McCoy Tyner | Tender Moments | 12/1/67 | |
| BST 84276 | 1968 | Duke Pearson | Introducing Duke Pearson's Big Band | 12/15/67 | |
| BST 84277 | 1968 | Horace Silver | Serenade to a Soul Sister | 2/23/68, 3/29/68 | |
| BST 84278 | 1968 | Frank Foster | Manhattan Fever | 3/21/68 | |
| BST 84279 | 1968 | Herbie Hancock | Speak Like a Child | 3/5/68, 3/6/68 | |
| BST 84280 | 1968 | Lou Donaldson | Midnight Creeper | 3/15/68 | |
| BST 84281 | 1968 | John Patton | That Certain Feeling | 3/8/68 | |
| BST 84282 | 1968 | Elvin Jones | Puttin' It Together | 4/8/68 | |
| BST 84283 | 1968 | Booker Ervin | The In Between | 1/12/68 | |
| BST 84284 | 1968 | Jackie McLean | 'Bout Soul | 9/8/67 | |
| BST 84285 | 1968 | The 3 Sounds | Coldwater Flat | 4/11/68, 4/12/68, 4/15/68 | |
| BST 84286 | 1968 | Stanley Turrentine | The Look of Love | 4/15/68 | |
| BST 84287 | 1968 | Ornette Coleman | New York Is Now! | 4/29/68, 5/7/68 | |
| BST 84288 | 1968 | Hank Mobley | Reach Out! | 1/19/68 | |
| BST 84289 | 1968 | Lee Morgan | Caramba! | 5/3/68 | |
| BST 84290 | 1968 | Lonnie Smith | Think! | 7/23/68 | |
| BST 84291 | 1968 | Bobby Hutcherson | Total Eclipse | 7/12/68 | |
| BST 84292 | 1968 | Donald Byrd | Slow Drag | 5/12/67 | |
| BST 84293 | 1968 | Duke Pearson | The Phantom | 9/11/68 | |
| BST 84294 | 1968 | Eddie Gale | Ghetto Music | 9/20/68 | |
| BST 84295 | 1968 | Reuben Wilson | On Broadway | 10/4/68 | |
| BST 84296 | 1968 | Jimmy Smith | Plain Talk | 3/22/60 | |
| BST 84297 | | Wayne Shorter | Schizophrenia | 3/10/67 | |
| BST 84298 | | Stanley Turrentine | Always Something There | 10/14/68, 10/28/68 | |
| BST 84299 | 1969 | Lou Donaldson | Say It Loud! | 11/6/68 | |
| BST 84300 | 1969 | Blue Mitchell | Collision in Black | 9/11/68, 9/12/68 | |

==== 4300 series ====
| Catalog number | Year | Artist | Title | Date recorded | Notes |
|---|---|---|---|---|---|
| BST 84301 | | The 3 Sounds | Elegant Soul | 9/19/68, 9/20/68 | |
| BST 84302 | | Kenny Cox | Introducing Kenny Cox | 12/9/68 | |
| BST 84303 | | Andrew Hill | Grass Roots | 8/5/68 | |
| BST 84304 | | Larry Young | Heaven on Earth | 2/9/68 | |
| BST 84305 | | Elvin Jones | The Ultimate | 9/6/68 | |
| BST 84306 | | John Patton | Understanding | 10/25/68 | |
| BST 84307 | | McCoy Tyner | Time for Tyner | 5/17/68 | |
| BST 84308 | | Duke Pearson | Now Hear This | 12/2/68, 12/3/68 | |
| BST 84309 | | Horace Silver | You Gotta Take a Little Love | 1/10/69, 1/17/69 | |
| BST 84310 | | Grant Green | Goin' West | 11/30/62 | |
| BST 84311 | | Don Cherry | Where Is Brooklyn? | 11/11/66 | |
| BST 84312 | | Lee Morgan | Charisma | 9/29/66 | |
| BST 84313 | | Lonnie Smith | Turning Point | 1/3/69 | |
| BST 84314 | | Booker Ervin | unissued | 5/24/68 | |
| BST 84315 | | Stanley Turrentine | Common Touch | 8/30/68 | |
| BST 84316 | | Frank Foster | unissued | 1/31/69 | |
| BST 84317 | | Reuben Wilson | Love Bug | 3/21/69 | |
| BST 84318 | | Lou Donaldson | Hot Dog | 4/25/69 | |
| BST 84319 | | Donald Byrd | Fancy Free | 5/9/69, 6/6/69 | |
| BST 84320 | | Eddie Gale | Black Rhythm Happening | 5/2/69 | |
| BST 84321 | | Herbie Hancock | The Prisoner | 4/18/69, 4/21/69, 4/23/69 | |
| BST 84322 | | Brother Jack McDuff | Down Home Style | 6/10/69 | |
| BST 84323 | | Duke Pearson | Merry Ole Soul | 2/25/69, 8/19/69 | |
| BST 84324 | | Blue Mitchell | Bantu Village | 5/22/69, 5/23/69 | |
| BST 84325 | | Horace Silver | The Best of Horace Silver | Various dates | compilation |
| BST 84326 | | Lonnie Smith | Move Your Hand | 8/9/69 | |
| BST 84327 | | Grant Green | Carryin' On | 10/3/69 | |
| BST 84328 | | Jack Wilson | Song for My Daughter | 9/28/68, 12/16/68, 4/23/69 | |
| BST 84329 | | Hank Mobley | The Flip | 7/12/69 | |
| BST 84330 | | Andrew Hill | Lift Every Voice | 5/16/69 | |
| BST 84331 | | Elvin Jones | Poly-Currents | 9/26/69 | |
| BST 84332 | | Wayne Shorter | Super Nova | 8/29/69, 9/2/69 | |
| BST 84333 | | Bobby Hutcherson | Now! | 11/5/69 | |
| BST 84334 | | Brother Jack McDuff | Moon Rappin' | 12/1/69, 12/2/69 | |
| BST 84335 | | Lee Morgan | The Sixth Sense | 11/10/67 | |
| BST 84336 | | Stanley Turrentine | Another Story | 3/3/69 | |
| BST 84337 | | Lou Donaldson | Everything I Play Is Funky | 8/22/69 | |
| BST 84338 | | McCoy Tyner | Expansions | 8/23/68 | |
| BST 84339 | | Kenny Cox | Multidirection | 11/26/69 | |
| BST 84340 | | John Patton | Accent on the Blues | 8/15/69 | |
| BST 84341 | | The 3 Sounds | Soul Symphony | 9/26/69 | |
| BST 84342 | | Grant Green | Green Is Beautiful | 1/30/70 | |
| BST 84343 | | Reuben Wilson | Blue Mode | 12/12/69 | |
| BST 84344 | | Duke Pearson | How Insensitive | 4/11/69, 4/14/69, 5/5/69 | |
| BST 84345 | | Jackie McLean | Demon's Dance | 12/22/67 | |
| BST 84346 | | The Thad Jones/Mel Lewis Orchestra | Consummation | 1/20/70, 1/21/70, 1/28/70, 5/25/70 | |
| BST 84347 | | Art Blakey and the Jazz Messengers | Roots & Herbs | 2/18/61 | |
| BST 84348 | | Brother Jack McDuff | To Seek a New Home | 3/23/70, 3/24/70, 3/26/70 | |
| BST 84349 | | Donald Byrd | Electric Byrd | 5/15/70 | |
| BST 84350 | | Jimmy McGriff | Electric Funk | 9/??/69 | |
| BST 84351 | | Lonnie Smith | Drives | 1/2/70 | |
| BST 84352 | | Horace Silver | That Healin' Feelin' | 4/8/70, 6/18/70 | |
| BST 84353 | | Chick Corea | The Song of Singing | 4/7/70, 4/8/70 | |
| BST 84354 | | Jeremy Steig | Wayfaring Stranger | 2/11/70 | |
| BST 84355 | | Joe Williams | Worth Waiting For | 5/5/70 | |
| BST 84356 | | Ornette Coleman | Love Call | 4/29/68, 5/7/68 | |
| BST 84357 | | Candido Camero | Beautiful | 10/20/70, 10/27/70 | |
| BST 84358 | | Jack McDuff | Who Knows What Tomorrow's Gonna Bring? | 12/1-3/70 | |
| BST 84359 | | Lou Donaldson | Pretty Things | 1/9/70, 6/12/70 | |
| BST 84360 | | Grant Green | Alive! | 8/15/70 | |
| BST 84361 | | Elvin Jones | Coalition | 7/17/70 | |
| BST 84362 | | Bobby Hutcherson | San Francisco | 7/15/70 | |
| BST 84363 | | Wayne Shorter | Odyssey of Iska | 8/26/70 | |
| BST 84364 | | Jimmy McGriff | Something to Listen To | 9/??/70 | |
| BST 84365 | | Reuben Wilson | A Groovy Situation | 9/18/70, 9/25/70 | |
| BST 84366 | | John Patton | unissued | 10/2/70 | |
| BST 84367 | N/A | Hank Mobley | Thinking of Home | 7/31/70 | unreleased; issued as LT 1045 |
| BST 84368 | | Horace Silver | Total Response | 11/15/70, 1/29/71 | |
| BST 84369 | | Elvin Jones | Genesis | 2/12/71 | |
| BST 84370 | | Lou Donaldson | Cosmos | 7/16/71 | |
| BST 84371 | | Lonnie Smith | unissued | 5/21/70 | |
| BST 84372 | | Richard Groove Holmes | Comin' On Home | 5/19/71 | |
| BST 84373 | | Grant Green | Visions | 5/21/71 | |
| BST 84374 | | Jimmy McGriff | Black Pearl | 2/??/71 | |
| BST 84375 | | Ornette Coleman | unissued | | |
| BST 84376 | | Bobby Hutcherson | Head On | 7/1/71, 7/3/71 | |
| BST 84377 | | Reuben Wilson | Set Us Free | 7/23/71 | |
| BST 84378 | | Gene Harris | The 3 Sounds | 7/26-27/71, 8/2-3/71 | |
| BST 84379 | | Bobbi Humphrey | Flute-In | 9/30/71, 10/1/71 | |
| BST 84380 | | Donald Byrd | Ethiopian Knights | 8/25/71, 8/26/71 | |
| BST 84381 | | Lee Morgan | unissued | 9/17/71, 9/18/71 | |
| BST 84382 | | Ronnie Foster | Two Headed Freap | 1/20/72, 1/21/72 | |
| BST 84383–84400 | N/A | Not used | Not used | Not used | |

==== 4400 series ====
| Catalog number | Year | Artist | Title | Date recorded | Notes |
|---|---|---|---|---|---|
| BST 84401–84412 | N/A | Not used | Not used | Not used | |
| BST 84413 | 1972 | Grant Green | Shades of Green | 11/23/71, 11/24/71 | |
| BST 84414 | 1972 | Elvin Jones | Merry-Go-Round | 12/15/71 | |
| BST 84415 | 1972 | Grant Green | The Final Comedown | 12/13/71, 12/14/71 | |
| BST 84416 | 1972 | Bobby Hutcherson | Natural Illusions | 3/2/72, 3/3/72 | |
| BST 84417 | N/A | Hank Mobley | Thinking of Home | 7/31/70 | unreleased; issued as LT 1045 |
| BST 84418 | N/A | John Patton | Memphis to New York Spirit | 10/2/70 | unreleased; issued 1996 |
| BST 84419 | N/A | McCoy Tyner | Extensions | 2/9/70 | unreleased; issued as LA 006-F |
| BST 84420 | 1972 | Horace Silver | All | 1/17/72, 2/14/72 | |
| BST 84421 | 1972 | Bobbi Humphrey | Dig This! | 7/20/72, 7/21/72 | |
| BST 84422 | 1972 | Marlena Shaw | Marlena | 8/10/72, 8/11/72, 8/16/72 | |
| BST 84423 | 1972 | Gene Harris | Gene Harris of the Three Sounds | 6/29/72, 6/30/72 | |

==== Modern Jazz New 4400 series ====
| Catalog number | Year | Artist | Title | Date recorded |
|---|---|---|---|---|
| BST 84424 | 1985 | Stanley Turrentine | ZT's Blues | 9/13/61 |
| BST 84425 | 1985 | Hank Mobley | Far Away Lands | 5/26/67 |
| BST 84426 | 1984 | Lee Morgan | The Rajah | 11/29/66 |
| BST 84427 | 1984 | Jackie McLean | Tippin' the Scales | 9/28/62 |
| BST 84428 | 1984 | Clifford Brown | Alternate Takes | 6/9/53, 6/20/53, 8/28/53 |
| BST2 84429 | 1984 | Various artists | The Best of Blue Note, Volume 1 | Various dates |
| BST 84430 | 1985 | Bud Powell | Alternate Takes | 8/8/49, 8/14/53, 8/3/57, 5/28/58, ... |
| BST 84431 | 1985 | Hank Mobley | Another Workout | 3/26/61, 12/5/61 |
| BST 84432 | 1985 | Grant Green | Born to Be Blue | 3/1/62, 12/23/61 |
| BST2 84433 | 1986 | Various artists | The Best of Blue Note, Volume 2 | Various dates |
| BST 84434 | 1986 | The 3 Sounds | Babe's Blues | 8/13/61 |
| BST 84435 | 1986 | Hank Mobley | Straight No Filter | 3/7/63, 2/5/65, 6/17/66 |

=== Modern Jazz New 89900 series ===
| Catalog number | Year | Artist | Title |
|---|---|---|---|
| BST 89901 | 1967 | Jimmy Smith | Jimmy Smith's Greatest Hits! |
| BST 89902 | 1969 | Various artists | Blue Note's Three Decades of Jazz, Volume 1: 1939–1949 |
| BST 89903 | 1969 | Various artists | Blue Note's Three Decades of Jazz, Volume 2: 1949–1959 |
| BST 89904 | 1969 | Various artists | Blue Note's Three Decades of Jazz, Volume 3: 1959–1969 |
| BST 89905 | 1970 | Various artists | Jazz Wave, Ltd., Volume 1: On Tour |
| BST 89906 | 1971 | Lee Morgan | Live at the Lighthouse |
| BST 89907 | 1973 | Herbie Hancock | The Best of Herbie Hancock |

== BN-LA / LT series ==
=== BN-LA series ===
12" LP's issued during the 1970s using the numbering sequence of parent company United Artists Records with an extra prefix. The suffix is a code for the list price of the album and whether it is a two-disc set. In this series there are many reissues from earlier series, "Best of" albums, live albums and compilations, as well as new studio albums.

| Catalogue number | Year | Artist | Title | Notes |
|---|---|---|---|---|
| BN-LA 006-F | 1972 | McCoy Tyner | Extensions | |
| BN-LA 007-G | 1972 | Moacir Santos | Maestro | |
| BN-LA 014-G | | Wayne Shorter | Moto Grosso Feio | |
| BN-LA 015-G2 | | Elvin Jones | Live at the Lighthouse | |
| BN-LA 024-G | | Lou Donaldson | Sophisticated Lou | |
| BN-LA 037-G2 | | Grant Green | Live at the Lighthouse | |
| BN-LA 047-F | 1973 | Donald Byrd | Black Byrd | |
| BN-LA 054-F | 1973 | Horace Silver | In Pursuit of the 27th Man | |
| BN-LA 059-F | 1973 | Alphonse Mouzon | The Essence of Mystery | |
| BN-LA 098-G | 1973 | Ronnie Foster | Sweet Revival | |
| BN-LA 099-G | 1973 | Mickey Tucker / Roland Hanna | The New Heritage Keyboard Quartet | |
| BN-LA 109-F | 1973 | Lou Donaldson | Sassy Soul Strut | |
| BN-LA 110-F | 1973 | Elvin Jones | Mr. Jones | |
| BN-LA 140-F | 1973 | Donald Byrd | Street Lady | |
| BN-LA 141-G2 | 1973 | Gene Harris | Yesterday, Today & Tomorrow | |
| BN-LA 142-G | 1973 | Bobbi Humphrey | Blacks and Blues | |
| BN-LA 143-F | 1973 | Marlena Shaw | From the Depths of My Soul | |
| BN-LA 152-F | | Herbie Hancock / Willie Bobo | Succotash | |
| BN-LA 158-G2 | | Various artists | Decades of Jazz, Vol. 1 | |
| BN-LA 159-G2 | | Various artists | Decades of Jazz, Vol. 2 | |
| BN-LA 160-G2 | | Various artists | Decades of Jazz, Vol. 3 | |
| BN-LA 169-F | | Cannonball Adderley | Somethin' Else | |
| BN-LA 170-G2 | | The Jazz Crusaders | Tough Talk | |
| BN-LA 171-G2 | | Les McCann | Fish This Week | |
| BN-LA 222-G | 1974 | Alphonse Mouzon | Funky Snakefoot | |
| BN-LA 223-G | 1974 | McCoy Tyner | Asante | |
| BN-LA 224-G | 1974 | Lee Morgan | Memorial Album | |
| BN-LA 237-G2 | 1974 | Grant Green | Grant Green | compilation; The Blue Note Reissue Series |
| BN-LA 249-G | 1974 | Bobby Hutcherson | Live at Montreux | |
| BN-LA 250-G | 1974 | Ronnie Foster | Live at Montreux | |
| BN-LA 251-G | 1974 | Marlena Shaw | Live at Montreux | |
| BN-LA 252-G | 1974 | Bobbi Humphrey | Live at Montreux | |
| BN-LA 257-G | 1974 | Bobby Hutcherson | Cirrus | |
| BN-LA 258-G | 1974 | Don Minasi | When Joanna Loved Me | |
| BN-LA 259-G | 1974 | Lou Donaldson | Sweet Lou | |
| BN-LA 260-G | 1974 | Moacir Santos | Saudade | |
| BN-LA 261-G | 1974 | Ronnie Foster | On the Avenue | |
| BN-LA 267-G | 1974 | Clifford Brown | Brownie Eyes | |
| BN-LA 313-G | 1974 | Gene Harris | Astral Signal | |
| BN-LA 317-G | 1974 | Duke Pearson | It Could Only Happen with You | |
| BN-LA 344-G | 1974 | Bobbi Humphrey | Satin Doll | |
| BN-LA 356-H2 | 1975 | Freddie Hubbard | Freddie Hubbard | compilation; The Blue Note Reissue Series |
| BN-LA 368-G | 1975 | Donald Byrd | Stepping into Tomorrow | |
| BN-LA 369-G | 1975 | Bobby Hutcherson | Linger Lane | |
| BN-LA 370-G | 1975 | The Waters | Waters | |
| BN-LA 392-H2 | 1975 | The Thad Jones / Mel Lewis Orchestra | Thad Jones/Mel Lewis | compilation; The Blue Note Reissue Series |
| BN-LA 393-H2 | 1975 | Dexter Gordon | Dexter Gordon | compilation; The Blue Note Reissue Series |
| BN-LA 394-H2 | 1975 | Stanley Turrentine | Stanley Turrentine | compilation; The Blue Note Reissue Series |
| BN-LA 395-H2 | 1975 | Chick Corea | Chick Corea | compilation; The Blue Note Reissue Series |
| BN-LA 397-G | 1975 | Marlena Shaw | Who Is This Bitch, Anyway? | |
| BN-LA 398-G | 1975 | Alphonse Mouzon | Mind Transplant | |
| BN-LA 399-H2 | 1975 | Herbie Hancock | Herbie Hancock | compilation; The Blue Note Reissue Series |
| BN-LA 400-H2 | 1975 | Jimmy Smith | Jimmy Smith | compilation; The Blue Note Reissue Series |
| BN-LA 401-H2 | 1975 | Sonny Rollins | Sonny Rollins | compilation; The Blue Note Reissue Series |
| BN-LA 402-H2 | 1975 | Horace Silver | Horace Silver | compilation; The Blue Note Reissue Series |
| BN-LA 406-G | 1975 | Horace Silver | Silver 'n Brass | |
| BN-LA 425-G | 1975 | Ronnie Foster | Cheshire Cat | |
| BN-LA 426-G | 1975 | Don Minasi | I Have the Feeling I've Been Here Before | |
| BN-LA 451-H2 | 1975 | Paul Chambers / John Coltrane | High Step | |
| BN-LA 452-G | 1975 | Ronnie Laws | Pressure Sensitive | |
| BN-LA 453-H2 | 1975 | Sam Rivers | Involution | |
| BN-LA 456-H2 | 1975 | Lester Young | The Aladdin Sessions | |
| BN-LA 457-H2 | 1975 | Jackie McLean | Jacknife | |
| BN-LA 458-H2 | 1975 | Cecil Taylor | In Transition | |
| BN-LA 459-H2 | 1975 | Andrew Hill | One for One | |
| BN-LA 460-H2 | 1975 | McCoy Tyner | Cosmos | |
| BN-LA 461-H2 | 1975 | Gil Evans | Pacific Standard Time | compiles New Bottle Old Wine (1958) and Great Jazz Standards (1959), originally released on World Pacific |
| BN-LA 462-G | 1975 | Carmen McRae | I Am Music | |
| BN-LA 463-G | 1975 | Moacir Santos | Carnival of the Spirits | |
| BN-LA 464-G | 1975 | Eddie Henderson | Sunburst | |
| BN-LA 472-H2 | 1975 | Chick Corea | Circling In | |
| BN-LA 473-J2 | | Art Blakey | Live Messengers | |
| BN-LA 474-H2 | | Horace Silver | The Trio Sides | |
| BN-LA 475-H2 | 1975 | Sonny Rollins | More from the Vanguard | |
| BN-LA 483-H2 | | Jackie McLean | Hipnosis | |
| BN-LA 485-H2 | 1975 | Herbie Nichols | The Third World | |
| BN-LA 488-H2 | | Booker Ervin | Back from the Gig | |
| BN-LA 496-H2 | | Freddie Hubbard | Here to Stay | |
| BN-LA 506-H2 | | Elvin Jones | The Prime Element | |
| BN-LA 507-H2 | 1975 | Fats Navarro | Prime Source | |
| BN-LA 519-G | 1975 | Gene Harris | Nexus | |
| BN-LA 520-H2 | 1975 | Chico Hamilton | Peregrinations | |
| BN-LA 521-H2 | 1975 | Johnny Griffin / John Coltrane / Hank Mobley | Blowin' Sessions | |
| BN-LA 529-H2 | 1975 | Paul Horn | Paul Horn in India | |
| BN-LA 530-H2 | 1975 | The Jazz Crusaders | The Young Rabbits | |
| BN-LA 531-H2 | 1975 | Wes Montgomery | Beginnings | |
| BN-LA 532-H2 | 1975 | Gerry Mulligan / Lee Konitz | Revelation | |
| BN-LA 533-H2 | 1975 | T-Bone Walker | Classics of Modern Blues | |
| BN-LA 534-G | 1975 | Jimmy Witherspoon | Spoonful | |
| BN-LA 541-G | 1975 | John Lee / Gerry Brown | Mango Sunrise | |
| BN-LA 549-G | 1975 | Donald Byrd | Places and Spaces | |
| BN-LA 550-G | 1975 | Bobbi Humphrey | Fancy Dancer | |
| BN-LA 551-G | 1975 | Bobby Hutcherson | Montara | |
| BN-LA 579-H2 | 1976 | Thelonious Monk | The Complete Genius | |
| BN-LA 581-G | 1976 | Horace Silver | Silver 'n Wood | |
| BN-LA 582-J2 | | Lee Morgan | The Procrastinator | |
| BN-LA 584-G | 1976 | Alphonse Mouzon | The Man Incognito | |
| BN-LA 590-H2 | 1976 | Milt Jackson | All Star Bags | |
| BN-LA 591-H2 | 1976 | Art Pepper | Early Art | |
| BN-LA 596-G | 1976 | Earl Klugh | Earl Klugh | |
| BN-LA 598-H2 | 1976 | Randy Weston | Little Niles | |
| BN-LA 606-G | 1976 | Marlena Shaw | Just a Matter of Time | |
| BN-LA 615-G | 1976 | Bobby Hutcherson | Waiting | |
| BN-LA 622-G | 1976 | Chico Hamilton | Chico Hamilton and the Prayers | |
| BN-LA 628-H | 1976 | Ronnie Laws | Fever | |
| BN-LA 632-H2 | 1976 | Jean-Luc Ponty | Cantaloupe Island | |
| BN-LA 633-G | 1976 | Donald Byrd | Caricatures | |
| BN-LA 634-G | 1976 | Gene Harris | In a Special Way | |
| BN-LA 635-G | 1976 | Carmen McRae | Can't Hide Love | |
| BN-LA 636-G | 1976 | Eddie Henderson | Heritage | |
| BN-LA 645-G | 1976 | Barbara Carroll | Barbara Carroll | |
| BN-LA 663-J2 | 1976 | Various artists | Blue Note Live at the Roxy | |
| BN-LA 664-G | | Robbie Krieger | Robbie Krieger and Friends | |
| BN-LA 667-G | 1976 | Earl Klugh | Living Inside Your Love | |
| BN-LA 690-J2 | | War | Platinum Jazz | |
| BN-LA 699-G | 1976 | | Bobbi Humphrey's Best | |
| BN-LA 700-G | 1976 | | Donald Byrd's Best | |
| BN-LA 701-G | 1976 | John Lee / Gerry Brown | Still Can't Say Enough | |
| BN-LA 708-G | 1977 | Horace Silver | Silver 'n Voices | |
| BN-LA 709-H2 | 1977 | Carmen McRae | Carmen McRae at the Great American Music Hall | |
| BN-LA 710-G | 1977 | Bobby Hutcherson | The View from the Inside | |
| BN-LA 711-G | 1977 | Willie Bobo | Tomorrow Is Here | |
| BN-LA 730-H | 1977 | Ronnie Laws | Friends & Strangers | |
| BN-LA 736-H | 1977 | Noel Pointer | Phantazia | |
| BN-LA 737-H | 1977 | Earl Klugh | Finger Paintings | |
| BN-LA 738-G | 1977 | Maxi Anderson | Maxi | |
| BN-LA 760-H | 1977 | Gene Harris | Tone Tantrum | |
| BN-LA 789-G | 1977 | Bobby Hutcherson | Knucklebean | |
| BN-LA 819-H | 1977 | Rico Rodriguez | Man from Wareika | |
| BN-LA 853-H | 1978 | Horace Silver | Silver 'n Percussion | |
| BN-LA 870-H | 1978 | Various artists | Blue Note Meet the L.A. Philharmonic | |
| BN-LA 882-J2 | 1978 | Chick Corea | Circulus | |
| BN-LA 883-J2 | 1978 | Stanley Turrentine | Jubilee Shout!!! | |
| BN-LA 945-H | 1979 | Horace Silver | Sterling Silver | |

=== LT series ===
After EMI acquired United Artists Records, Blue Note LPs continued to appear with catalog numbers taken from the main numbering sequence of UA and its successor, the revived Liberty Records. This is effectively a continuation of the BN-LA series without UA's letter codes. Albums in this series appeared in the late 1970s and early 1980s.

| Catalog number | Year | Artist | Title | Date recorded |
|---|---|---|---|---|
| LT-987 | 1979 | Lee Morgan | Sonic Boom | 4/14/67, 4/28/67 |
| LT-988 | 1979 | Wayne Shorter | The Soothsayer | 3/4/65 |
| LT-989 | 1979 | Dexter Gordon | Clubhouse | 5/27/65 |
| LT-990 | 1979 | Grant Green | Solid | 6/12/64 |
| LT-991 | 1979 | Donald Byrd | Chant | 4/17/61 |
| LT-992 | 1979 | Jimmy Smith | Confirmation | 8/25/57, 2/25/58 |
| LT-993 | 1979 | Stanley Turrentine | New Time Shuffle | 2/17/67, 6/23/67 |
| LT-994 | 1979 | Jackie McLean | Consequence | 12/3/65 |
| LT-995 | 1979 | Hank Mobley | A Slice of the Top | 3/18/66 |
| LT-996 | 1979 | Bobby Hutcherson | Spiral | 4/3/65, 11/11/68 |
| LT-1028 | 1980 | Lou Donaldson | Midnight Sun | 7/22/60 |
| LT-1030 | 1980 | Andrew Hill | Dance with Death | LT-10/11/68 |
| LT-1031 | 1980 | Lee Morgan | Taru | 2/15/68 |
| LT-1032 | 1980 | Grant Green | Nigeria | 1/13/62 |
| LWB-1033 | 1980 | Horace Silver | Silver 'n Strings Play the Music of the Spheres | LT-11/3/78, 11/10/78, 10/26/79, 11/2/79 |
| LT-1037 | 1979 | Stanley Turrentine | In Memory Of | 6/3/64 |
| LT-1038 | 1980 | Larry Young | Mother Ship | 2/7/69 |
| LT-1044 | 1980 | Bobby Hutcherson | Patterns | 3/14/68 |
| LT-1045 | 1980 | Hank Mobley | Thinking of Home | 7/31/70 |
| LT-1046 | 1980 | The Jazz Crusaders | Live Sides | |
| LT-1051 | 1980 | Dexter Gordon | Landslide | 5/9/61, 5/5/62, 6/25/62 |
| LT-1052 | 1980 | Ike Quebec | With a Song in My Heart | 2/5/62, 2/13/62 |
| LT-1053 | 1980 | Joe Pass | The Complete "Catch Me!" Sessions | |
| LT-1054 | 1980 | Jimmy Smith | Cool Blues | 4/7/58 |
| LT-1055 | N/A | Vic Dickenson / Bobby Hackett | Mainstreamin' | not released |
| LT-1056 | 1980 | Wayne Shorter | Et Cetera | 6/14/65 |
| LT-1057 | 1980 | Harold Land | Take Aim | 7/25/60 |
| LT-1058 | 1980 | Lee Morgan | Tom Cat | 8/11/64 |
| LT-1064 | 1981 | Art Pepper | Omega Alpha | 4/1/57 |
| LT-1065 | 1981 | Art Blakey and the Jazz Messengers | Once Upon a Groove | 1/14/57, 2/11/57 |
| LT-1075 | 1980 | Stanley Turrentine | Mr. Natural | LT-9/4/64 |
| LT-1076 | 1980 | Leo Parker | Rollin' with Leo | LT-10/12/61, 10/20/61 |
| LT-1081 | 1981 | Hank Mobley | Third Season | 2/24/67 |
| LT-1082 | 1980 | Blue Mitchell | Step Lightly | 8/13/63 |
| LT-1085 | 1980 | Jackie McLean | Vertigo | 5/2/59, 6/14/62, 2/11/63 |
| LT-1086 | 1980 | Bobby Hutcherson | Medina | 8/11/69 |
| LT-1088 | 1981 | Art Blakey and the Jazz Messengers | Africaine | LT-11/10/59 |
| LT-1089 | 1981 | Ike Quebec | Congo Lament | 1/20/62 |
| LT-1091 | 1981 | Lee Morgan | Infinity | LT-11/16/65 |
| LT-1092 | 1981 | Jimmy Smith | On the Sunny Side | 8/25/57, 6/15/58, 6/16/59, 4/25/60 |
| LT-1095 | 1981 | Stanley Turrentine | Ain't No Way | 5/10/68, 6/23/69 |
| LT-1096 | 1981 | Donald Byrd | The Creeper | LT-10/6/61 |
| LT-1100 | 1981 | Bob Brookmeyer / Bill Evans | As Time Goes By | 3/12/59 |
| LT-1101 | 1981 | Gerry Mulligan | Freeway | 6/10/52, 7/9/52, 8/16/52, 10/15/52 |
| LT-1102 | 1981 | Jean-Luc Ponty | Live at Donte's | 3/11/69, 3/12/69 |
| LT-1103 | 1981 | Joe Pass | Joy Spring | 2/6/64 |

== Manhattan 85100 series ==
Series of new studio albums as well as a few reissues released c. 1985–87, following Blue Note's reestablishment.

| Catalog number | Year | Artist | Title |
|---|---|---|---|
| 85101 | 1985 | Stanley Jordan | Magic Touch |
| 85102 | 1985 | McCoy Tyner / Jackie McLean | It's About Time |
| 85103 | 1985 | George Russell | The African Game |
| 85104 | | Charles Lloyd | A Night in Copenhagen |
| 85105 | 1985 | Stanley Turrentine | Straight Ahead |
| 85106 | 1985 | Kenny Burrell / Grover Washington Jr. | Togethering |
| 85107 | 1985 | Bennie Wallace | Twilight Time |
| 85108 | 1985 | Charlie Parker | At Storyville |
| 85109 | 1985 | James Newton | The African Flower |
| 85110 | | Bobby McFerrin | Spontaneous Inventions |
| 85111 | 1985 | Bill Evans | The Alternative Man |
| 85112 | 1985 | Dexter Gordon | Nights at the Keystone |
| 85113 | 1985 | Various artists | One Night with Blue Note, Vol. 1 |
| 85114 | 1985 | Various artists | One Night with Blue Note, Vol. 2 |
| 85115 | 1985 | Various artists | One Night with Blue Note, Vol. 3 |
| 85116 | 1985 | Various artists | One Night with Blue Note, Vol. 4 |
| 85117 | 1985 | Various artists | One Night with Blue Note, Preserved |
| 85118 | 1985 | Out of the Blue | OTB |
| 85119 | 1985 | Tony Williams | Foreign Intrigue |
| 85120 | N/A | Unissued | Unissued |
| 85121 | 1986 | Freddie Hubbard / Woody Shaw | Double Take |
| 85122 | 1986 | Don Pullen / George Adams | Breakthrough |
| 85123 | 1986 | Joe Henderson | The State of the Tenor Live at the Village Vanguard, Vol. 1 |
| 85124 | 1986 | Michel Petrucciani | Pianism |
| 85125 | 1986 | Jimmy Smith | Go for Whatcha Know |
| 85126 | | Joe Henderson | The State of the Tenor Live at the Village Vanguard, Vol. 2 |
| 85127 | 1986 | Blue Note '86 | A New Generation of Jazz |
| 85128 | 1986 | Out of the Blue | Inside Track |
| 85129 | 1986 | Duke Ellington | Money Jungle |
| 85130 | 1986 | Stanley Jordan | Standards, Vol. 1 |
| 85131 | | Eric Dolphy | Other Aspects |
| 85132 | | George Russell | So What |
| 85133 | | Michel Petrucciani | Power of Three |
| 85134 | | James Newton | Romance and Revolution |
| 85135 | | Dexter Gordon | The Other Side of Round Midnight |
| 85136 | 1987 | James "Blood" Ulmer | America – Do You Remember the Love? |
| 85137 | 1987 | Kenny Burrell and the Jazz Guitar Band | Generation |
| 85138 | 1987 | Tony Williams | Civilization |
| 85139 | 1987 | Freddie Hubbard | Life Flight |
| 85140 | 1987 | Stanley Turrentine | Wonderland |
| 85141 | 1987 | Out of the Blue | Live at Mt. Fuji |

== Other series ==
=== 1600 series ===
These CDs make available originally unissued material from the sessions from the 1500 series. They were manufactured by Toshiba-EMI and use 20-bit, 88.2 kHz recording technology.

| Catalog number | Artist | Title | Date recorded |
|---|---|---|---|
| 1601 | Various artists | Blue Trails: The Rare Tracks | |
| 1602 | Art Blakey | A Night in Birdland, Volume 3 | 2/21/54 |
| 1603 | The Jazz Messengers | At the Cafe Bohemia, Volume 3 | 11/23/55 |
| 1604 | Thelonious Monk | Genius of Modern Music, Volume 3 | 10/15/47, 10/24/47, 11/21/47, 7/23/51, 5/30/52 |
| 1605 | Clifford Brown | More Memorable Tracks | 6/9/53, 8/28/53 |
| 1606 | Kenny Dorham | 'Round About Midnight at the Cafe Bohemia Volume 2 | 5/31/56 |
| 1607 | Kenny Dorham | 'Round About Midnight at the Cafe Bohemia Volume 3 | 5/31/56 |
| 1608 | Herbie Nichols | Herbie Nichols Trio, Volume 2 | 8/7/55, 4/19/56 |
| 1609 | Kenny Burrell | Kenny Burrell, Volume 3 | 3/12/56, 5/29/56, 5/31/56 |
| 1610 | Jimmy Smith / Lou Donaldson | Jimmy Smith Trio + LD | 7/4/57 |
| 1611 | Hank Mobley / Sonny Clark | Curtain Call | 8/18/57 |
| 1612 | Jimmy Smith | Cherokee | |
| 1613 | Sonny Rollins | A Night at the Village Vanguard, Volume 2 | 11/3/57 |
| 1614 | Sonny Rollins | A Night at the Village Vanguard, Volume 3 | 11/3/57 |
| 1615 | Jimmy Smith | Lonesome Road | |
| 1616 | Tina Brooks | Minor Move | 3/16/58 |
| 1617 | Sonny Clark Trio | The 45 Sessions | 9/13/57, 11/16/58 |
| 1618 | Sonny Clark | Blues in the Night | 12/7/58 |
| 1619 | Bennie Green | The 45 Session | 11/23/58 |
| 1620 | Hank Mobley | Poppin' | 10/20/57 |

=== 9000 series ===
An experimental and short-lived vocal jazz series; only two albums were released in this series:

| Catalogue number | Year | Artist | Title |
|---|---|---|---|
| BLP 9001 | 1963 | Dodo Greene | My Hour of Need |
| BLP 9002 | 1963 | Sheila Jordan | Portrait of Sheila |

=== King Records ===
==== GXF 3000 series ====
| Catalog number | Year | Artist | Title |
|---|---|---|---|
| GXF-3023 | 1978 | | Lee Morgan All-Star Sextet |
| GXF-3024 | 1978 | | Lee Morgan Sextet |
| GXF-3051 | 1979 | Sonny Clark | Blues in the Night |
| GXF-3052 | 1979 | Kenny Burrell | K.B. Blues |
| GXF-3053 | 1979 | Grant Green | Matador |
| GXF-3054 | 1979 | Wayne Shorter | The Soothsayer |
| GXF-3055 | 1979 | Dexter Gordon | Clubhouse |
| GXF-3056 | 1979 | Sonny Clark | My Conception |
| GXF-3057 | 1979 | Kenny Burrell | Freedom |
| GXF-3058 | 1979 | Grant Green | Gooden's Corner |
| GXF-3059 | 1979 | Wayne Shorter | The Collector |
| GXF-3060 | 1979 | Art Blakey & the Jazz Messengers | Pisces |
| GXF-3061 | 1979 | Bobby Hutcherson | Oblique |
| GXF-3062 | 1979 | Jackie McLean | Tippin' the Scales |
| GXF-3063 | 1980 | Bennie Green | Minor Revelation |
| GXF-3064 | 1980 | Curtis Fuller | Two Bones |
| GXF-3065 | 1980 | Grant Green | Oleo |
| GXF-3066 | 1980 | Hank Mobley | Poppin' |
| GXF-3067 | 1980 | Jackie McLean, Tina Brooks | Street Singer |
| GXF-3068 | 1980 | Lou Donaldson | Sweet Slumber |
| GXF-3069 | 1980 | Sonny Clark | The Art of the Trio |
| GXF-3070 | 1980 | Kenny Burrell | Swingin' |
| GXF-3071 | 1980 | Grant Green | Remembering |
| GXF-3072 | 1980 | Tina Brooks | Minor Move |
| GXF-3073 | 1980 | Bobby Hutcherson | Inner Glow |
| GXF-3074 | not released | Art Blakey & the Jazz Messengers | The Jazz Messengers at the Cafe Bohemia, Volume 3 |
| GXF-3075 | not released | Grant Green | Born to Be Blue |
| GXF-3076 | not released | The 3 Sounds | D.B. Blues |
| GXF-3077 | not released | Kenny Dorham | 'Round About Midnight at the Cafe Bohemia, Vol. 2 |
| GXF-3078 | not released | Jimmy Smith | Lonesome Road |
| GXF-3079 | not released | Hank Mobley | Another Workout |
| GXF-3080 | not released | Andrew Hill | Chained |

==== GP 3100 series ====
| Catalog number | Year | Artist | Title |
|---|---|---|---|
| GP-3186 | 1979 | Tommy Flanagan | Lonely Town |

==== K18P-9200 series ====
| Catalog number | Year | Artist | Title |
|---|---|---|---|
| K18P-9271 | 1983 | | Elmo Hope Trio/Elmo Hope Quintet |
| K18P-9272 | 1983 | | Herbie Nichols Trio |
| K18P-9273 | 1983 | | Julius Watkins Sextet |
| K18P-9274 | 1983 | | Howard McGhee All Stars/Howard McGhee Sextet |
| K18P-9275 | 1983 | | Gil Melle Quintet/Gil Melle Sextet |
| K18P-9276 | 1983 | | George Wallington and His Band/Hank Mobley Quartet |
| K18P-9277 | 1983 | Sonny Rollins | A Night at the Village Vanguard, Volume 2 |
| K18P-9278 | 1983 | Sonny Rollins | A Night at the Village Vanguard, Volume 3 |
| K18P-9279 | 1983 | Sonny Clark | Cool Struttin', Vol. 2 |
| K18P-9280 | 1983 | Jimmy Smith | The Singles |

==== King Records BONUS DY 5800 series ====
| Catalog number | Year | Artist | Title |
|---|---|---|---|
| DY-5801-01 | 1983 | Grant Green | Am I Blue |
| DY-5801-02 | 1983 | Leo Parker | Let Me Tell You 'Bout It |
| DY-5805-01 | 1983 | Art Blakey & the Jazz Messengers | The Jazz Messengers at the Cafe Bohemia, Volume 3 |
| DY-5806-01 | 1983 | Jutta Hipp Quintet | New Faces-New Sounds from Germany |

=== Other ===
| Year | Artist | Title |
|---|---|---|
| 1993 | Us3 | Hand on the Torch |
| 1996 | Various artists | The New Groove: The Blue Note Remix Project |
| 1997 | Us3 | Broadway & 52nd |
| 2003 | Madlib | Shades of Blue: Madlib Invades Blue Note |
| 2003 | Various artists | Untinted: Sources for Madlib's Shades of Blue |
| 2003 | Various artists | Blue Note Trip Series |
| 2004 | Various artists | Blue Note Revisited |
| 2015 | Various artists | Supreme Sonacy, Vol. 1 |
| 2020 | Various artists | Blue Note Re:imagined |
| 2022 | Various artists | Blue Note Re:imagined II |

== Bibliography ==
- Cohen, Frederick. Blue Note Records: A Guide for Identifying Original Pressings. ISBN 978-0-692-00322-0.
- Cook, Richard. Blue Note Records: A Biography. ISBN 1-932112-10-3.
- Cuscuna, Michael & Michel Ruppli. The Blue Note Label: A Discography. ISBN 0-313-31826-3 [2nd ed 2001]
- Marsh, Graham & Glyn Callingham. Blue Note: Album Cover Art. ISBN 0-8118-3688-6.
- Marsh, Graham Blue Note 2: The Album Cover Art: The Finest in Jazz Since 1939. ISBN 0-8118-1853-5 [US edition]
- Wolff, Francis et al. Blue Note Jazz Photography of Francis Wolff. ISBN 0-7893-0493-7.
