= The Amazing Bud Powell, Vols. 1 & 2 =

The Amazing Bud Powell
- Volume 1

Compilation album by the Amazing Bud Powell
- Released: April 1956
- Recorded: August 8, 1949; May 1, 1951; August 14, 1953
- Studio: WOR, NYC
- Genre: Bebop
- Label: Blue Note; BLP 1503 (Vol. 1); BLP 1504 (Vol. 2)
- Producer: Alfred Lion

Bud Powell chronology
The Genius of Bud Powell (1956)	The Amazing Bud Powell (1956)	Bud Powell's Moods (1956)

The Amazing Bud Powell
- Volume 2

The Amazing Bud Powell, Vols. 1 & 2 are a pair of separate but related albums by American jazz pianist Bud Powell, recorded on August 8, 1949, May 1, 1951, and August 14, 1953, and released on Blue Note in 1956, compiling Powell's first three sessions for the label, originally released on ten-inch LPs as The Amazing Bud Powell (1952) and The Amazing Bud Powell, Vol. 2 (1954).

== Background ==
=== Recording ===
Powell recorded his first three session for Blue Note at WOR Studios in New York. In the first session, Powell performed in quintet with Fats Navarro, Sonny Rollins, Tommy Potter and Roy Haynes, and in trio with Potter and Haynes. In the second, Powell performed in trio with Curley Russell and Max Roach, and solo. In the third, Powell is backed by rhythm section George Duvivier and Art Taylor.

=== Release history ===
Volume 1 was initially released in March 1956; Volume 2 was released the following month.

After 10"s became less popular, Blue Note began reissuing its Modern Jazz Series on 12"s. The three sessions were subsequently recompiled across The Amazing Bud Powell, Volume 1 (BLP 1503) and The Amazing Bud Powell, Volume 2 (BLP 1504), the second pair of releases on Blue Note's 1500 series, their first one hundred 12" records after they discontinued their line of 10" records.

The two volumes were recompiled for their CD reissue, ordering the three sessions chronologically, placing the first session and the solo takes from the second session on Volume 1, and three trio takes and the third session on Volume 2. These remasters were also included on The Complete Blue Note and Roost Recordings, a four-disc box set.

When Rudy Van Gelder remastered the pair of the 2001 RVG edition, he placed the first two sessions on Volume 1 and the third session on Volume 2, mirroring the original 10" releases. Prior to this, on all releases bar the first, the album also contained a number of tracks from sessions originally on The Amazing Bud Powell, Vol. 1.

== Reception ==
Professional ratings
Review scores
Source	Rating
AllMusic (Vol. 1)	5/5 stars
AllMusic (Vol. 2)	4/5 stars
The Rolling Stone Jazz Record Guide (Vol. 1)	5/5 stars
The Rolling Stone Jazz Record Guide (Vol. 2)	5/5 stars
The Penguin Guide to Jazz Recordings (Vol. 1)	4/4 stars
The Penguin Guide to Jazz Recordings (Vol. 2)	4/4 stars
Encyclopedia of Popular Music	5/5 stars

The Penguin Guide to Jazz Recordings included both albums in its suggested “core collection” of essential recordings.

The albums are highly rated within Powell's musical library, described by All About Jazz as "among the pianist's most important recordings" and by The Complete Idiot's Guide to Jazz as "a great introduction to this awesome pianist". Jazz critic Scott Yanow characterized them in his book Jazz on Record as "full of essential music".

In Bebop: The Best Musicians and Recordings, Yanow identifies among the highlights of the album "Bouncing with Bud", "52nd Street Theme" and "Dance of the Infidels," performed by the "very exciting quintet" of 1949, and also the 1951 trio's "three stunning versions of 'Un Poco Loco'". In The Blackwell Guide to Recorded Jazz, Barry Kernfeld notes with regards to "Un Poco Loco" that "the three takes [of the song]...enable us to hear the evolution of a masterpiece", a label with which a critic at The New York Times concurred.

While the song "Un Poco Loco" has been identified as musically outstanding, it has also been discussed as culturally significant. According to Race Music: Black Cultures from Bebop to Hip-Hop, although Afro-Cuban jazz had been introduced in the 1940s by such artists as Dizzy Gillespie and Machito, "Un Poco Loco" is a significant marker in the establishment of this musical genre, as it revealed "the Afro-Cuban turn settling into bebop's acceptable field of rhetorical conventions". More than Afro-Cuban, the authors of that book detect what they describe as a "Pan-African" musical influence in the composition's repetition, harmony and cyclic solo that, while not as obviously Afro-international as Gillespie's "A Night in Tunisia', "certainly signaled a 'blackness' that became part of the language of subsequent expressions of modern jazz." The book Jazz 101 indicates that Powell's performances of this material in 1951 was "all the more astonishing" in its "level of creativity, and even authenticity" because little was known at the time of African music or how Latin music (aside from the Cuban influence) could be applied to jazz. According to Yanow, in Afro-Cuban Jazz: The Essential Listening Companion, this composition was Powell's only involvement with Afro-Cuban Jazz.

== Track listing ==
=== The Amazing Bud Powell, Volume 1 (1956, 12", BLP 1503) ===
All tracks are written by Bud Powell, except as noted.

Side 1
No.	Title	Writer(s)	Date recorded	Length
1.	"Un Poco Loco" (alternate take #1)		May 1, 1951	3:46
2.	"Un Poco Loco" (alternate take #2)		May 1, 1951	4:28
3.	"Un Poco Loco"		May 1, 1951	4:42
4.	"Dance of the Infidels"		August 8, 1949	2:50
5.	"52nd Street Theme"	Thelonious Monk	August 8, 1949	2:45
6.	"It Could Happen to You" (alternate take)	Burke; Van Heusen	May 1, 1951	3:12

Side 2
No.	Title	Writer(s)	Date recorded	Length
1.	"A Night in Tunisia" (alternate take)	Gillespie; Paparelli	May 1, 1951	3:49
2.	"A Night in Tunisia"	Gillespie; Paparelli	May 1, 1951	4:12
3.	"Wail"		August 8, 1949	3:02
4.	"Ornithology"	Harris; Parker	August 8, 1949	2:20
5.	"Bouncing with Bud"	Fuller; Powell	August 8, 1949	3:01
6.	"Parisian Thoroughfare"		May 1, 1951	3:23

=== The Amazing Bud Powell, Volume 2 (1956, 12", BLP 1504) ===
All tracks are written by Bud Powell, except as noted.

Side 1
No.	Title	Writer(s)	Date recorded	Length
1.	"Reets and I"	Harris	August 14, 1953	3:18
2.	"Autumn in New York"	Duke	August 14, 1953	2:51
3.	"I Want to Be Happy"	Youmans, Caesar	August 14, 1953	2:50
4.	"It Could Happen to You"	Van Heusen, Burke	May 1, 1951	3:13
5.	"Sure Thing"		August 14, 1953	2:39
6.	"Polka Dots and Moonbeams"	Van Heusen, Burke	August 14, 1953	4:00

Side 2
No.	Title	Writer(s)	Date recorded	Length
1.	"Glass Enclosure"		August 14, 1953	2:21
2.	"Collard Greens and Black-Eyed Peas"	Pettiford	August 14, 1953	3:01
3.	"Over the Rainbow"	Harold Arlen, E.Y. "Yip" Harburg	May 1, 1951	2:57
4.	"Audrey"		August 14, 1953	2:54
5.	"You Go to My Head"	J. Fred Coots, Haven Gillespie	August 8, 1949	3:15
6.	"Ornithology" (alternate take)	Benny Harris, Charlie Parker	August 8, 1949	3:11

=== CD reissues ===
==== 1989 reissue ====
All tracks are written by Bud Powell, except as noted.

The Amazing Bud Powell, Volume 1
No.	Title	Writer(s)	Date recorded	Length
1.	"Bouncing with Bud" (alternate take #1)	Fuller; Powell	August 8, 1949	3:03
2.	"Bouncing with Bud" (alternate take #2)	Fuller; Powell	August 8, 1949	3:12
3.	"Bouncing with Bud"	Fuller; Powell	August 8, 1949	3:01
4.	"Wail" (alternate take)		August 8, 1949	2:38
5.	"Wail"		August 8, 1949	3:02
6.	"Dance of the Infidels" (alternate take)		August 8, 1949	2:52
7.	"Dance of the Infidels"		August 8, 1949	2:50
8.	"52nd Street Theme"	Monk	August 8, 1949	2:45
9.	"You Go to My Head"	Coots; H. Gillespie	August 8, 1949	3:11
10.	"Ornithology"	Harris; Parker	August 8, 1949	2:20
11.	"Ornithology" (alternate take)	Harris; Parker	August 8, 1949	3:07
12.	"Un Poco Loco" (alternate take #1)		May 1, 1951	3:46
13.	"Un Poco Loco" (alternate take #2)		May 1, 1951	4:28
14.	"Un Poco Loco"		May 1, 1951	4:42
15.	"Over the Rainbow"	Arlen; Harburg	May 1, 1951	2:55

All tracks are written by Bud Powell, except as noted.

The Amazing Bud Powell, Volume 2
No.	Title	Writer(s)	Date recorded	Length
1.	"A Night in Tunisia"	Dizzy Gillespie, Frank Paparelli	May 1, 1951	4:16
2.	"A Night in Tunisia" (alternate take)	Gillespie, Paparelli	May 1, 1951	3:52
3.	"It Could Happen to You" (alternate take)	Van Heusen, Burke	May 1, 1951	2:22
4.	"It Could Happen to You"	Van Heusen, Burke	May 1, 1951	3:16
5.	"Parisian Thoroughfare"		May 1, 1951	3:25
6.	"Autumn in New York"	Duke	August 14, 1953	2:51
7.	"Reets and I"	Harris	August 14, 1953	3:18
8.	"Reets and I" (alternate take)		August 14, 1953	2:30
9.	"Sure Thing"		August 14, 1953	2:39
10.	"Collard Greens and Black-Eyed Peas" (alternate take)		August 14, 1953	2:11
11.	"Collard Greens and Black-Eyed Peas"	Pettiford	August 14, 1953	3:01
12.	"Polka Dots and Moonbeams"	Van Heusen, Burke	August 14, 1953	4:00
13.	"I Want to Be Happy"	Youmans, Caesar	August 14, 1953	2:50
14.	"Audrey"		August 14, 1953	2:54
15.	"Glass Enclosure"		August 14, 1953	2:21

==== 2001 RVG edition ====
All tracks are written by Bud Powell, except as noted.

The Amazing Bud Powell, Volume 1
No.	Title	Writer(s)	Date recorded	Length
1.	"Bouncing with Bud"	Fuller; Powell	August 8, 1949	3:04
2.	"Wail"		August 8, 1949	3:06
3.	"Dance of the Infidels"		August 8, 1949	2:54
4.	"52nd Street Theme"	Monk	August 8, 1949	2:50
5.	"You Go to My Head"	Coots; H. Gillespie	August 8, 1949	3:15
6.	"Ornithology"	Harris; Parker	August 8, 1949	2:23
7.	"Bouncing with Bud" (alternate take #1)		August 8, 1949	3:06
8.	"Bouncing with Bud" (alternate take #2)		August 8, 1949	3:16
9.	"Wail" (alternate take)		August 8, 1949	2:42
10.	"Dance of the Infidels" (alternate take)		August 8, 1949	2:51
11.	"Ornithology" (alternate take)		August 8, 1949	3:12
12.	"Un Poco Loco"		May 1, 1951	4:46
13.	"Over the Rainbow"	Arlen; Harburg	May 1, 1951	2:59
14.	"A Night in Tunisia"	Gillespie; Paparelli	May 1, 1951	4:17
15.	"It Could Happen to You"	Burke; Van Heusen	May 1, 1951	3:17
16.	"Parisian Thoroughfare"		May 1, 1951	3:26
17.	"Un Poco Loco" (alternate take #1)		May 1, 1951	3:49
18.	"Un Poco Loco" (alternate take #2)		May 1, 1951	4:32
19.	"A Night in Tunisia" (alternate take)		May 1, 1951	3:53
20.	"It Could Happen to You" (alternate take)		May 1, 1951	2:23

All tracks are written by Bud Powell, except as noted.

The Amazing Bud Powell, Volume 2
No.	Title	Writer(s)	Date recorded	Length
1.	"Autumn in New York"	Duke	August 14, 1953	2:54
2.	"Reets and I"	Harris	August 14, 1953	3:22
3.	"Sure Thing"		August 14, 1953	2:40
4.	"Collard Greens and Black-Eyed Peas"	Pettiford	August 14, 1953	3:04
5.	"Polka Dots and Moonbeams"	Van Heusen, Burke	August 14, 1953	4:04
6.	"I Want to Be Happy"	Youmans, Caesar	August 14, 1953	2:53
7.	"Audrey"		August 14, 1953	2:58
8.	"Glass Enclosure"		August 14, 1953	2:25
9.	"I've Got You Under My Skin"	Cole Porter	August 14, 1953	2:37
10.	"Autumn in New York" (alternate take #1)		August 14, 1953	2:13
11.	"Autumn in New York" (alternate take #2)		August 14, 1953	2:58
12.	"Reets and I" (alternate take #1)		August 14, 1953	2:33
13.	"Reets and I" (alternate take #2)		August 14, 1953	3:13
14.	"Sure Thing" (alternate take)		August 14, 1953	2:45
15.	"Collard Greens and Black-Eyed Peas" (alternate take)		August 14, 1953	2:11

== Personnel ==
=== Musicians ===
==== August 8, 1949 ====
- Bud Powell – piano
- Fats Navarro – trumpet (except "You Go to My Head", "Ornithology")
- Sonny Rollins – tenor saxophone (except "You Go to My Head", "Ornithology")
- Tommy Potter – bass
- Roy Haynes – drums

==== May 1, 1951 ====
- Bud Powell – piano
- Curley Russell – bass (except "Over the Rainbow", "It Could Happen to You")
- Max Roach – drums (except "Over the Rainbow", "It Could Happen to You")

==== August 14, 1953 ====
- Bud Powell – piano
- George Duvivier – bass
- Art Taylor – drums

=== Technical personnel ===
==== Original ====
- Alfred Lion – producer
- Doug Hawkins – recording engineer
- Rudy Van Gelder – mastering
- John Hermansader – design
- Francis Wolff – photography
- Leonard Feather – liner notes

==== Reissue ====
- Michael Cuscuna – producer
- Rudy Van Gelder – disc transfers (1989); disc transfers, digital audio restoration and mastering (2001)
- Ron McMaster (1989) – digital transfers
- Leonard Feather (1989), Bob Blumenthal (2001) – liner notes
