= Vertigo (Jackie McLean album) =

Studio album by Jackie McLean
- Released: 1980; 2000 (CD)
- Recorded: May 2, 1959; June 14, 1962; February 11, 1963
- Studios: Van Gelder, Englewood Cliffs, NJ
- Genre: Jazz
- Length: 40:48 (LP); 76:07 (CD)
- Labels: Blue Note; LT 1085; 7243 5 22669 2 0 (CD)
- Producer: Alfred Lion

Jackie McLean chronology
Tippin' the Scales (1962)	Vertigo (1980)	One Step Beyond (1963)

Alternative cover
- CD release (2000)

Vertigo is an album by American saxophonist Jackie McLean, recorded in 1962 and 1963 but not released on the Blue Note label until 1980. The initial release contained only the five tracks from 1963 (with the additional track "Formidable" from 1959, later released as a bonus track on New Soil), while the later 2000 limited CD edition, released as part of the "Connoisseur Series", added six tracks from a 1962 session originally marked for release as Jackie McLean Quintet (BLP 4116), first issued in 1978 as part of a double LP entitled Hipnosis.

== Reception ==
The AllMusic review by Scott Yanow stated that "the music ranges from catchy funk and hard bop to strong hints of the avant-garde". The JazzTimes review by Bill Shoemaker said: "McLean really doesn't stray far from the winning Blue Note formula of smartly constructed hard bop and blues on the date, which, given the groundswell stemming from One Step Beyond and Destination... Out! explains why the date was withheld."

Professional ratings
Review scores
Source	Rating
AllMusic	4/5 stars
The Penguin Guide to Jazz Recordings	3/4 stars
The Rolling Stone Jazz Record Guide	3/5 stars

== Track listing ==
All compositions by Jackie McLean, except where indicated.

=== Original LP (1980) ===
1. "Marney" (Donald Byrd, Bernard Herrmann) - 6:17
2. "Dusty Foot" (Byrd) - 6:57
3. "Formidable" (Walter Davis, Jr.) - 6:16
4. "Vertigo" - 8:20
5. "Cheers" - 4:56
6. "Yams" (Herbie Hancock) - 8:02

Recorded on May 2, 1959 (3), and February 11, 1963 (all others).

Personnel

Tracks 1,2,4,5 & 6

- Jackie McLean - alto saxophone
- Donald Byrd - trumpet
- Herbie Hancock - piano
- Butch Warren - bass
- Tony Williams - drums

Track 3

- Jackie McLean - alto saxophone
- Donald Byrd - trumpet
- Walter Davis Jr. - piano
- Paul Chambers - bass
- Pete LaRoca - drums

=== CD reissue (2000) ===
1. "Marney" (Byrd, Herrmann) - 6:17
2. "Dusty Foot" (Byrd) - 6:57
3. "Vertigo" - 8:20
4. "Cheers" - 4:56
5. "Yams" (Hancock) - 8:02
6. "The Three Minors" - 6:05
7. "Blues in a Jiff" (Sonny Clark) - 7:12
8. "Blues for Jackie" (Kenny Dorham) - 7:53
9. "Marilyn's Dilemma" (Billy Higgins) - 5:03
10. "Iddy Bitty" - 8:17
11. "The Way I Feel" (Butch Warren) - 7:05

Recorded on June 14, 1962 (6–11), and February 11, 1963 (1–5).

Personnel

Tracks 1–5

- Jackie McLean - alto saxophone
- Donald Byrd - trumpet
- Herbie Hancock - piano
- Butch Warren - bass
- Tony Williams - drums

Tracks 6–11

- Jackie McLean - alto saxophone
- Kenny Dorham - trumpet
- Sonny Clark - piano
- Butch Warren - bass
- Billy Higgins - drums

== Charts ==
=== Weekly charts ===
Weekly chart performance for Vertigo
Chart (2026)	Peak position
Greek Albums (IFPI)	61

=== Monthly charts ===
Monthly chart performance for Vertigo
Chart (2026)	Peak position
German Jazz Albums (Offizielle Top 100)	13
