= Straight Ahead (Stanley Turrentine album) =

Studio album by Stanley Turrentine
- Released: 1985
- Recorded: November 24 & December 7, 1984
- Genre: Jazz
- Label: Blue Note
- Producer: Stanley Turrentine

Stanley Turrentine chronology
Home Again (1982)	Straight Ahead (1985)	Wonderland (1970)

Straight Ahead is an album by jazz saxophonist Stanley Turrentine, released in 1985 on Blue Note Records. This album peaked at No. 10 on the US Billboard Top Jazz Albums chart.

== Background ==
Straight Ahead was Turrentine's first album on Blue Note since 1969's Another Story. Artists such as Jimmy Smith, George Benson, Ron Carter, Jimmy Madison, Les McCann, and Jimmy Ponder appear on this album.

== Critical reception ==
Professional ratings
Review scores
Source	Rating
AllMusic	3/5 stars

Michael Erlewine of AllMusic, in a 3/5 star review, wrote "Great combination of musicians as on earlier cookers, but time has passed — it does not come off. Pleasant enough though, but lacks high spots".

== Track listing ==
All compositions by Stanley Turrentine except as indicated

1. "Plum" (George Benson) - 6:09
2. "A Child Is Born" (Thad Jones) - 8:03
3. "Other Side of Time" - 5:25
4. "Straight Ahead" - 6:25
5. "The Longer You Wait" (Les McCann, Jon Hendricks) - 8:58
6. "Ah Rio" (Ron Carter) - 4:54

- Recorded at Power Play Studios, Long Island City, NY on November 24, 1984 (tracks 5 & 6) and Sigma Sound Studios, NYC on December 7, 1984 (tracks 1–4).

== Personnel ==
- Stanley Turrentine – tenor saxophone
- Jimmy Smith – organ (tracks 1, 2, 4 & 6)
- George Benson – electric guitar (tracks 1, 2, 4 & 6)
- Ron Carter – bass (tracks 1, 2, 4 & 6)
- Jimmy Madison – drums (tracks 1, 2, 4 & 6)
- Les McCann – piano, electric piano (tracks 3 & 5)
- Jimmy Ponder – electric guitar (tracks 3 & 5)
- Peter Brown – electric bass (tracks 3 & 5)
- Gerrick King – drums (tracks 3 & 5)
