= Glass Enclosure =

Song by Bud Powell

from the album The Amazing Bud Powell, Vol. 2
- Released: 1954
- Recorded: August 14, 1953
- Studio: WOR Studios, New York City
- Genre: Jazz
- Length: 2:21
- Label: Blue Note
- Composer(s): Bud Powell
- Producer(s): Alfred Lion

"Glass Enclosure" (occasionally "The Glass Enclosure") is a composition by jazz pianist Bud Powell. The first recording was Powell's version for Blue Note Records in 1953, which was released as part of the album The Amazing Bud Powell, Vol. 2 the following year. It was also released as one side of a single, with "I Want to Be Happy".

== Background ==
Powell had been in a mental institution until six months before the recording session. He was contracted to play at the Birdland jazz club in New York, and its manager was Powell's legal guardian. He kept Powell locked in an apartment to ensure that the pianist would play at the club. According to Blue Note producer Alfred Lion, who went to the apartment one day, "There was a piano there and [Powell] played me some new things. One piece really stood out. I asked him what he called it. He looked around the apartment and said, 'Glass Enclosure'."

Alternative explanations for the title have been proposed by critic Kevin Whitehead: it could have been for the announcer's booth that was beside the stage at Birdland, "or maybe the invisible box that walled Bud off like a trapped mime."

== Composition and performance ==
"Glass Enclosure" is stylistically different from Powell's typical compositions, which were often more conventional bebop numbers. Leonard Feather wrote in the original album liner notes that "'Glass Enclosure' is more or less in four movements: the first somewhat maestoso, the next a swinging format on two 10-bar phrases: then a pensive yet flowing movement with a stirring bowed-bass underline, followed by a reminder of the first movement". Author Francis Davis states that "'Glass Enclosure' juxtaposes to harrowing effect an agitated blues riff and a ten-bar fanfare". It "runs through a sequence of abrupt changes of mood and direction", described by critic Kenny Mathieson as "disturbing, unsettling fantasia".

The musicians for the original performance were Powell (piano), George Duvivier (bass), and Art Taylor (drums). Duvivier had taken over as the bassist in Powell's trio probably around a month before the recording. Davis indicated that the piece was entirely composed, while Mathieson suggested that the composition leaves "little scope for improvisation".

== Reception and legacy ==
Reviewing Powell's original recording in DownBeat, critic Nat Hentoff described it as "the best and most stimulatingly organized Bud original yet recorded and one that shows ... the potential of this musician for significant composition as well as influential interpretation".

Davis suggested that "This piece has to be played Powell's way or not at all, which explains why it's so rarely performed." Powell himself also played the piece in public.

Saxophonist Wayne Shorter was influenced by the more advanced harmonies used in "Glass Enclosure" and other Powell compositions from the 1950s in his own writing of music. A Shorter biographer observed that, although "jazz musicians didn't start playing Lydian augmented chords with any frequency until the 1960s, Bud Powell played a few on 'The Glass Enclosure' in the early fifties" (Powell's 1951 "Un Poco Loco" also used lydian chords).
