= The Amazing Bud Powell, Vol. 2 =

Studio album by Bud Powell
- Released: 1954
- Recorded: August 14, 1953
- Studio: WOR, NYC
- Genre: Bebop
- Length: 24:19; 42:50 (RVG edition)
- Label: Blue Note; BLP 5041
- Producer: Alfred Lion

Bud Powell chronology
Jazz at Massey Hall (1953)	The Amazing Bud Powell, Vol. 2 (1954)	Jazz Original (1955)

The Amazing Bud Powell, Vol. 2 is a ten-inch LP by American jazz pianist Bud Powell recorded at WOR Studios in New York on August 14, 1953 and released on Blue Note the following year. Powell is backed by rhythm section George Duvivier and Art Taylor.

== Releases ==
Half of the original cuts were also released as 78 rpm singles: "I Want to Be Happy" c/w "The Glass Enclosure" (BN 1628), and "Sure Thing" c/w "Collard Greens and Black-Eye Peas (BN 1629).

Blue Note discontinued their 10" Modern Jazz late 1955. The following year, the label recompiled Powell's first three sessions as The Amazing Bud Powell, Volume 1 (1956; BLP 1503) and The Amazing Bud Powell, Volume 2 (1956; BLP 1504). In 1989, the album was digitally remastered and released on CD with the tracks listed in session chronological order, leaving five tracks from the 1951 session on the second volume.

When Rudy Van Gelder remastered the pair of the 2001 RVG edition, he placed the first two sessions on Volume 1 and the third session on Volume 2, mirroring the original 10" release. Prior to this, on all releases bar the first, the album also contained a number of tracks from sessions originally on The Amazing Bud Powell, Vol. 1.

== Reception ==
Professional ratings
Review scores
Source	Rating
AllMusic	4/5 stars
Bebop	10/10 stars
Encyclopedia of Popular Music	5/5 stars
The Rolling Stone Jazz Record Guide	5/5 stars
The Penguin Guide to Jazz Recordings	4/4 stars

The Penguin Guide to Jazz Recordings included the album in its suggested “core collection” of essential recordings.

== Track listing ==
=== Original release ===
All tracks are written by Bud Powell, except as noted.

Side 1
No.	Title	Writer(s)	Length
1.	"Autumn in New York"	Vernon Duke	2:54
2.	"Reets and I"	Benny Harris	3:22
3.	"Sure Thing"		2:39
4.	"Collard Greens and Black-Eyed Peas" (aka "Blues in the Closet")	Oscar Pettiford	3:04

Side 2
No.	Title	Writer(s)	Length
1.	"Polka Dots and Moonbeams"	Jimmy Van Heusen, Johnny Burke	4:04
2.	"I Want to Be Happy"	Vincent Youmans, Irving Caesar	2:53
3.	"Audrey"		2:58
4.	"Glass Enclosure" (aka "The Glass Enclosure")		2:25

All tracks are written by Bud Powell, except as noted.

2001 RVG edition
No.	Title	Writer(s)	Length
1.	"Autumn in New York"	Duke	2:54
2.	"Reets and I"	Harris	3:22
3.	"Sure Thing"		2:40
4.	"Collard Greens and Black-Eyed Peas"	Pettiford	3:04
5.	"Polka Dots and Moonbeams"	Van Heusen, Burke	4:04
6.	"I Want to Be Happy"	Youmans, Caesar	2:53
7.	"Audrey"		2:58
8.	"Glass Enclosure"		2:25
9.	"I've Got You Under My Skin"	Cole Porter	2:37
10.	"Autumn in New York" (alternate take #1)		2:13
11.	"Autumn in New York" (alternate take #2)		2:58
12.	"Reets and I" (alternate take #1)		2:33
13.	"Reets and I" (alternate take #2)		3:13
14.	"Sure Thing" (alternate take)		2:45
15.	"Collard Greens and Black-Eyed Peas" (alternate take)		2:11

== Personnel ==
=== Musicians ===
- Bud Powell – piano
- George Duvivier – bass
- Art Taylor – drums

=== Technical personnel ===
- Alfred Lion – producer
- Doug Hawkins – recording engineer
- John Hermansader – design
- Francis Wolff – photography
- Leonard Feather – liner notes
