= Wonderland (Stanley Turrentine album) =

Studio album by Stanley Turrentine
- Released: 1987
- Recorded: December 10–12, 1986
- Genre: Jazz
- Length: 39:29
- Label: Blue Note
- Producer: Stanley Turrentine

Stanley Turrentine chronology
Straight Ahead (1985)	Wonderland (1987)	La Place (1988)

Wonderland is an album by jazz saxophonist Stanley Turrentine, his second recorded for the Blue Note label following his return to the label in 1984, featuring four performances of tunes associated with Stevie Wonder by Turrentine with Don Grusin, Ronnie Foster, Mike Miller, Abe Laboriel, Harvey Mason, and Paulinho Da Costa with guest appearances by Wonder and Eddie del Barrio.

== Reception ==
The Allmusic review by Vince Ripol awarded the album 2 stars and states "The best results occur when Foster and Turrentine cut loose, taking liberties with familiar hits like "Boogie on Reggae Woman," which features Wonder on harmonica. Other times, Turrentine succumbs to routine tributes which are pleasant but unexceptional... overly familiar songs are given conservative treatments much of the time. There's too much talent assembled on Wonderland for any of these proven compositions to fail, which suggests Turrentine and Foster might have considered taking more risks".

Professional ratings
Review scores
Source	Rating
Allmusic	2/5 stars

== Track listing ==
All compositions by Stevie Wonder

1. "Bird of Beauty" – 5:12
2. "Creepin'" – 5:04
3. "You and I" – 4:52
4. "Living for the City" – 4:54
5. "Boogie on Reggae Woman" – 5:49
6. "Rocket Love" – 4:36
7. "Don't You Worry 'bout a Thing" – 4:37
8. "Sir Duke" – 4:26

- Recorded at Yamaha R&D Studios, Glendale, CA, December 10, 11 & 12, 1986

== Personnel ==
- Stanley Turrentine – tenor saxophone
- Ronnie Foster – piano, electric piano, synthesizer, vibraphone, arranger
- Don Grusin – piano, electric piano (tracks 1, 4–6 & 7)
- Mike Miller – guitar, electric guitar (tracks 1, 5 & 6)
- Abe Laboriel – electric bass (tracks 1–2 & 4–8)
- Harvey Mason – drums (tracks 1–2 & 4–8)
- Paulinho Da Costa – percussion (tracks 1–2 & 5–7)
- Stevie Wonder – harmonica (track 5)
- Eddie del Barrio – keyboards arranger (track 3)
