= Always Something There =

Studio album by Stanley Turrentine
- Released: 1968
- Recorded: October 1, 14 & 28, 1968
- Genre: Jazz
- Label: Blue Note
- Producer: Duke Pearson

Stanley Turrentine chronology
| Common Touch (1968) | Always Something There (1968) | Another Story (1969) |

Always Something There is an album by jazz saxophonist Stanley Turrentine recorded for the Blue Note label in 1968 and performed by Turrentine with orchestra and strings arranged by Thad Jones.

== Reception ==
Professional ratings
Review scores
| Source | Rating |
|---|---|
| Allmusic | 2/5 stars |
| DownBeat | 2/5 stars |

The Allmusic review by Michael Erlewine, awarded the album 2 stars. A review by Harvey Pekar in a contemporary issue of DownBeat panned the album as a commercial date with a dull performance by Turrentine, despite some redeeming work by Thad Jones.

== Track listing ==
1. "(There's) Always Something There to Remind Me" (Burt Bacharach, Hal David) - 2:40
2. "Little Green Apples" (Bobby Russell) - 4:05
3. "When I Look into Your Eyes" (Leslie Bricusse) - 2:30
4. "Light My Fire" (John Densmore, Robbie Krieger, Ray Manzarek, Jim Morrison) - 3:05
5. "Those Were the Days" (Gene Raskin) - 4:10
6. "Stoned Soul Picnic" (Laura Nyro) - 4:00
7. "Home Town" (Thad Jones) - 4:20
8. "Song for Bonnie" (Tommy Turrentine) - 2:30
9. "Hey Jude" (John Lennon, Paul McCartney) - 5:10
10. "The Fool on the Hill" (Lennon, McCartney) - 3:40
  - Recorded at A&R Studios, NYC on October 1, 1968 (tracks 2 & 10), October 14, 1968 (tracks 1, 4 & 9), and October 28, 1968 (tracks 3 & 5–8).

== Personnel ==
- Stanley Turrentine - tenor saxophone
- Burt Collins - flugelhorn
- Jimmy Cleveland - trombone
- Dick Berg, Jim Buffington, Brooks Tillotson - French horn
- Jerry Dodgion - alto saxophone, flute, clarinet
- Jerome Richardson - tenor saxophone, flute clarinet
- Hank Jones (tracks 2, 3, 5–8, 10), Herbie Hancock (tracks 1, 4, 9) - piano
- Barry Galbraith (tracks 2, 10), Kenny Burrell - guitar
- Bob Cranshaw - bass, electric bass
- Mel Lewis (tracks 1, 2, 4, 9 & 10), Mickey Roker (tracks 3, 5–8) - drums
- Thad Jones - trumpet, arranger
- Overdubbed string section
