= Blue Note Revisited =

Remix album by various artists
- Released: 2004
- Genre: Jazz, hip hop
- Label: Blue Note

Blue Note Revisited is a 2004 Blue Note Records remix-compilation, released on that label.

== Track listing ==
1. "Oriental Folk Song" (La Funk Mob Remix of Wayne Shorter)
2. "La Malanga" (Kenny Dope Remix of Bobby Hutcherson)
3. "Kudu" (Kyoto Jazz Massive Remix of Eddie Henderson)
4. "Lansanna's Priestess" (DJ Spinna Remix of Donald Byrd)
5. "Won't You Open Up Your Senses" (4 Hero Remix of Horace Silver)
6. "Los Alamitos Latinfunklovesong" (Bugz In The Attic Remix of Gene Harris)
7. "Young Warrior" (Madlib Remix of Bobbi Humphrey)
8. "Oblighetto" (J Dilla Remix of Brother Jack McDuff)
9. "The Emperor" (DJ Cam Featuring Erik Truffaz Remix of Donald Byrd)
10. "Footprints" (DJ Mehdi Dub Remix of Wayne Shorter)
11. "Song Of Will" (Jazzanova Remix of Eddie Gale)
12. "A Time To Remember" (Osunlade Remix of Grant Green)
13. "Caravan" (Matthew Herbert Remix of Michel Petrucciani )
14. ""The New Folk, Pt. 2"" (Towa Tei remix of Kenny Dorham) (Toshiba version bonus track)
