= Other Aspects =

Studio album by Eric Dolphy
- Released: 1987
- Recorded: 1960 and 1964
- Genre: Jazz
- Length: 41:10
- Label: Blue Note
- Producer: James Newton

Other Aspects is a collection of previously unreleased jazz recordings by Eric Dolphy made in 1960 and 1964, and released first in 1987 by Blue Note Records. The recordings originated with tapes that Dolphy left with composer Hale Smith and his wife Juanita before leaving for Europe in 1964 to tour with Charles Mingus. Years after Dolphy's death, Smith contacted James Newton, who, after reviewing the material, suggested that Smith get in touch with Blue Note. Newton ended up producing the album.

In terms of its instrumentation and style, Other Aspects is unique in Dolphy's recorded catalogue. The two "Inner Flight" tracks are solo flute pieces (David Toop called them "experiments in amalgamating jazz phrasing, expressive tone and free-flowing lines with the tightly 'graphic' abstraction of Varèse's Density 21.5"), while "Improvisations and Tukras" reflects Dolphy's interest in the music of India, and features tamboura and tabla. "Dolphy'n" is a duet with bassist Ron Carter, with Dolphy playing alto saxophone.

The piece titled "Jim Crow" on the track listing and attributed to Dolphy is actually "A Personal Statement", composed by Bob James, and was recorded while Dolphy was in Ann Arbor, Michigan for the 1964 ONCE Festival. James Newton was unsure as to its title or composer at the time of the album's release, and gave it the provisional title "Jim Crow". It features Dolphy and a countertenor vocalist, David Schwartz, of the Bob James Trio, and is illustrative of Dolphy's ongoing involvement with 20th-century classical music. Another version of the piece, with the correct title and attribution, was released as a bonus track on the 2018 album Musical Prophet: The Expanded 1963 New York Studio Sessions.

== Reception ==
Professional ratings
Review scores
Source	Rating
AllMusic	4/5 stars
The Penguin Guide to Jazz Recordings	2.5/4 stars
The Rolling Stone Jazz & Blues Album Guide	4/5 stars

In a review for AllMusic, Al Campbell called the album "fascinating, and in its own way essential" and described "Jim Crow" as "startling," noting that it "shows [Dolphy's] embracing of 20th century classical composition."

The authors of the Penguin Guide to Jazz Recordings wrote: "These are snapshots of a master musician at the point of take-off. Though less than wholly satisfying, they add to a disconcertingly small and compressed discography."

Michael J. West, writing for Jazz Times, praised the flute-oriented tracks, stating that, on "Inner Flight," Dolphy "plays in a clear, flowing style, making wide ballet-like leaps but then lilting back to earth like a leaf in the wind," while "Improvisations and Tukras" is portrayed as "an absolutely mesmerizing moment whose beautiful implications deserved further investigating."

== Track listing ==
All compositions by Dolphy, except as noted

1. "Jim Crow" — 15:22 ("A Personal Statement" renamed, composed by Bob James)
2. "Inner Flight, No. 1" — 4:07
3. "Dolphy'n" — 6:48
4. "Inner Flight, No. 2" — 4:05
5. "Improvisations and Tukras" (Traditional) — 10:53
- Recorded at University of Michigan, March 1 or 2 1964 (1), Esoteric Sound Studios, New York, November 1960 (2-4) and Stereo Sound Studios, New York, July 8, 1960 (5)

== Personnel ==
- Eric Dolphy — flute, bass clarinet, alto saxophone
- Bob James — piano (1)
- Ron Brooks — bass (1)
- Ron Carter — bass (3)
- Robert Pozar — drums (1)
- Gina Lalli — tabla (5)
- Roger Mason — Tamboura, Tambourine (5)
- David Schwartz — vocals (1)
