= One Step Beyond (Jackie McLean album) =

Studio album by Jackie McLean
- Released: January 1964
- Recorded: April 30, 1963
- Studio: Van Gelder, Englewood Cliffs, New Jersey, U.S.
- Genre: Avant-garde jazz
- Length: 37:33
- Label: Blue Note; BST 84137
- Producer: Alfred Lion

Jackie McLean chronology
Vertigo (1962-63)	One Step Beyond (1964)	Destination... Out! (1963)

One Step Beyond is an album by American saxophonist Jackie McLean, recorded in 1963 and released on the Blue Note label. This is the first of two albums where McLean replaced the usual pianist with vibraphone player Bobby Hutcherson. As a result, One Step Beyond features a new sound that, while still rooted in hard bop, was more spacious and adventurous than his earlier work and leaned towards post bop and free jazz. The group is rounded out by trombonist Grachan Moncur III, bassist Eddie Khan and drummer Tony Williams.

The CD release contains one alternate take as a bonus track.

== Reception ==
The AllMusic review by Thom Jurek stated: "One Step Beyond may have been the first volley McLean fired in the direction of the new jazz, and played it safe enough to ride out the hard bop he helped to create, but he cannot be faulted as a bandleader, as this music still sounds fresh, vital, and full of grainy mystery."

Professional ratings
Review scores
Source	Rating
AllMusic	5/5 stars
The Rolling Stone Jazz Record Guide	5/5 stars

== Track listing ==
All compositions by Jackie McLean, except where indicated.

1. "Saturday and Sunday" - 10:30
2. "Frankenstein" (Grachan Moncur III) - 7:32
3. "Blue Rondo" - 4:52
4. "Ghost Town" (Moncur) - 14:39
5. "Saturday and Sunday" [Alternate Take] - 8:32 Bonus track on CD reissue

== Personnel ==
- Jackie McLean – alto saxophone
- Grachan Moncur III – trombone
- Bobby Hutcherson – vibraphone
- Eddie Khan – double bass
- Tony Williams – drums
