= The Amazing Bud Powell =

1952 studio album by Bud Powell

Studio album by Bud Powell
- Released: April 1952
- Recorded: August 8, 1949; May 1, 1951
- Studio: WOR, NYC
- Genre: Jazz
- Length: 27:07
- Label: Blue Note; BLP 5003
- Producer: Alfred Lion

Bud Powell chronology
Jazz Giant (1950)	The Amazing Bud Powell (1952)	Jazz at Massey Hall (1953)

The Amazing Bud Powell is a ten-inch LP by American jazz pianist Bud Powell, recorded on August 8, 1949, and May 1, 1951, and released on Blue Note in April 1952. In the first session, Powell performed in quintet with Fats Navarro, Sonny Rollins, Tommy Potter and Roy Haynes, and in trio with Potter and Haynes. In the second, Powell performed in trio with Curley Russell and Max Roach, and solo.

== Release history ==
All eight original cuts (four from each session) were originally released as 78 rpm singles in 1949 and 1951: "You Go to My Head c/w Ornithology" (BN 1566), "Bouncing with Bud c/w Wail" (BN 1567), "Over the Rainbow c/w A Night in Tunisia" (BN 1576), and "Un Poco Loco c/w It Could Happen to You" (BN 1577).

Blue Note discontinued their 10" Modern Jazz in late 1955. The following year, the label recompiled Powell's first three sessions as The Amazing Bud Powell, Volume 1 (1956; BLP 1503) and The Amazing Bud Powell, Volume 2 (1956; BLP 1504). In 1989, the album was digitally remastered and released on CD with the tracks listed in session chronological order, leaving five tracks from the 1951 session on the second volume.

When Rudy Van Gelder remastered the pair of the 2001 RVG edition, he placed the first two sessions on Volume 1 and the third session on Volume 2, mirroring the original 10" releases. Prior to this, on all releases bar the first, the album also contained a number of tracks from sessions originally on The Amazing Bud Powell, Vol. 1.

== Reception ==
Professional ratings
Review scores
Source	Rating
AllMusic	5/5 stars
The Penguin Guide to Jazz Recordings	4/4 stars
The Rolling Stone Jazz Record Guide	5/5 stars

The album is rated highly within Powell's musical library, described by All About Jazz as "among the pianist's most important recordings" and by The Complete Idiot's Guide to Jazz (in conjunction with volume two) as "a great introduction to this awesome pianist". Jazz critic Scott Yanow characterized it in his book Jazz on Record as "full of essential music". The Penguin Guide to Jazz Recordings included the album in its suggested “core collection” of essential recordings.

In Bebop: The Best Musicians and Recordings, Yanow identifies among the highlights of the album "Bouncing with Bud", "52nd Street Theme" and "Dance of the Infidels," performed by the "very exciting quintet" of 1949, and also the 1951 trio's "three stunning versions of 'Un Poco Loco'". Barry Kernfeld in The Blackwell Guide to Recorded Jazz notes with regards to "Un Poco Loco" that "the three takes [of the song]...enable us to hear the evolution of a masterpiece", a label with which a critic at The New York Times concurred.

The album is critically prized among Powell's releases. Among the more discussed of the album's tracks is the pianist's composition "Un Poco Loco" ("A Little Crazy"), which has been singled out by critics and cultural historians for its musical and cultural significance.

While the song "Un Poco Loco" has been identified as musically outstanding, it has also been discussed as culturally significant. According to Race Music: Black Cultures from Bebop to Hip-Hop, although Afro-Cuban jazz had been introduced in the 1940s by such artists as Dizzy Gillespie and Machito, "Un Poco Loco" is a significant marker in the establishment of this musical genre, as it revealed "the Afro-Cuban turn settling into bebop's acceptable field of rhetorical conventions". More than Afro-Cuban, the authors of that book detect what they describe as a "Pan-African" musical influence in the composition's repetition, harmony and cyclic solo that, while not as obviously Afro-international as Gillespie's "A Night in Tunisia', "certainly signaled a 'blackness' that became part of the language of subsequent expressions of modern jazz." The book Jazz 101 indicates that Powell's performances of this material in 1951 was "all the more astonishing" in its "level of creativity, and even authenticity" because little was known at the time of African music or how Latin music (aside from the Cuban influence) could be applied to jazz. According to Yanow, in Afro-Cuban Jazz: The Essential Listening Companion, this composition was Powell's only involvement with Afro-Cuban Jazz.

== Track listing ==
=== Original release ===
All tracks are written by Bud Powell, except as noted.

Side 1
No.	Title	Writer(s)	Date recorded	Length
1.	"Un Poco Loco"		May 1, 1951	4:42
2.	"Over the Rainbow"	Harold Arlen; E.Y. "Yip" Harburg	May 1, 1951	2:55
3.	"Ornithology"	Benny Harris; Charlie Parker	August 8, 1949	2:20
4.	"Wail"		August 8, 1949	3:02

Side 2
No.	Title	Writer(s)	Date recorded	Length
1.	"A Night in Tunisia"	Dizzy Gillespie; Frank Paparelli	May 1, 1951	4:12
2.	"It Could Happen to You"	Johnny Burke; Jimmy Van Heusen	May 1, 1951	3:12
3.	"You Go to My Head"	J. Fred Coots; Haven Gillespie	August 8, 1949	3:11
4.	"Bouncing with Bud"	Gil Fuller; Powell	August 8, 1949	3:01

=== 2001 RVG edition ===
All tracks are written by Bud Powell, except as noted.

The Amazing Bud Powell, Volume 1
No.	Title	Writer(s)	Date recorded	Length
1.	"Bouncing with Bud"	Fuller; Powell	August 8, 1949	3:04
2.	"Wail"		August 8, 1949	3:06
3.	"Dance of the Infidels"		August 8, 1949	2:54
4.	"52nd Street Theme"	Monk	August 8, 1949	2:50
5.	"You Go to My Head"	Coots; H. Gillespie	August 8, 1949	3:15
6.	"Ornithology"	Harris; Parker	August 8, 1949	2:23
7.	"Bouncing with Bud" (alternate take #1)		August 8, 1949	3:06
8.	"Bouncing with Bud" (alternate take #2)		August 8, 1949	3:16
9.	"Wail" (alternate take)		August 8, 1949	2:42
10.	"Dance of the Infidels" (alternate take)		August 8, 1949	2:51
11.	"Ornithology" (alternate take)		August 8, 1949	3:12
12.	"Un Poco Loco"		May 1, 1951	4:46
13.	"Over the Rainbow"	Arlen; Harburg	May 1, 1951	2:59
14.	"A Night in Tunisia"	Gillespie; Paparelli	May 1, 1951	4:17
15.	"It Could Happen to You"	Burke; Van Heusen	May 1, 1951	3:17
16.	"Parisian Thoroughfare"		May 1, 1951	3:26
17.	"Un Poco Loco" (alternate take #1)		May 1, 1951	3:49
18.	"Un Poco Loco" (alternate take #2)		May 1, 1951	4:32
19.	"A Night in Tunisia" (alternate take)		May 1, 1951	3:53
20.	"It Could Happen to You" (alternate take)		May 1, 1951	2:23

== Personnel ==
=== Musicians ===
==== August 8, 1949 ====
- Bud Powell – piano
- Fats Navarro – trumpet (except "You Go to My Head", "Ornithology")
- Sonny Rollins – tenor saxophone (except "You Go to My Head", "Ornithology")
- Tommy Potter – bass
- Roy Haynes – drums

==== May 1, 1951 ====
- Bud Powell – piano
- Curley Russell – bass (except "Over the Rainbow", "It Could Happen to You")
- Max Roach – drums (except "Over the Rainbow", "It Could Happen to You")

=== Technical personnel ===
- Alfred Lion – producer
- Doug Hawkins – recording engineer
- John Hermansader – design
- Francis Wolff – photography
- Leonard Feather – liner notes
