= Un Poco Loco =

Single by Bud Powell

from the album The Amazing Bud Powell, Volume One
- B-side: "It Could Happen to You"
- Released: 1951
- Genre: Jazz
- Length: 4:42
- Label: Blue Note
- Songwriter(s): Bud Powell
- Producer(s): Alfred Lion

Bud Powell singles chronology
"Hallelujah" (1951)	"Un Poco Loco" (1951)

"Un Poco Loco" is an Afro-Cuban jazz standard composed by American jazz pianist Bud Powell. It was first recorded for Blue Note Records by Powell, Curly Russell, and Max Roach on May 1, 1951.

== Musical characteristics ==
"Un Poco Loco" is in thirty-two bar form. It uses the lydian scale, incorporating chords overlapping chords to imply a polytonality (D major 7 over C major 7: CEGBDF#AC#) with the improvisation based on an alternating polytonality and an altered dominant chord. Particularly remarkable to jazz musicians is the placement of C# against a C major 7 chord; James Weidman attributed this to bitonality, while Tardo Hammer attributed it to an extension of the circle of fifths.

== Legacy ==
In the late 1980s, literary and cultural critic Harold Bloom included "Un Poco Loco" in his list of the most "sublime" works of twentieth-century American art (from his introduction to Modern Critical Interpretations: Thomas Pynchon's Gravity's Rainbow).
