= Another Story (Stanley Turrentine album) =

Studio album by Stanley Turrentine
- Released: 1970
- Recorded: March 3, 1969
- Studio: Van Gelder Studio, Englewood Cliffs, NJ
- Genre: Jazz
- Length: 40:47
- Label: Blue Note; BST 84336
- Producer: Duke Pearson

Stanley Turrentine chronology
Always Something There (1968)	Another Story (1970)	Sugar (1970)

Another Story is an album by jazz saxophonist Stanley Turrentine recorded for the Blue Note label in 1969 and performed by Turrentine with Thad Jones, Cedar Walton, Buster Williams, and Mickey Roker.

== Reception ==
Professional ratings
Review scores
Source	Rating
Allmusic	4/5 stars

The Allmusic review awarded the album 4 stars.

== Track listing ==
All tracks are written by Stanley Turrentine, except where noted.

No.	Title	Writer(s)	Length
1.	"Get It"		7:49
2.	"The Way You Look Tonight"	Dorothy Fields, Jerome Kern	9:13
3.	"Stella by Starlight"	Ned Washington, Victor Young	5:33
4.	"Quittin' Time"	Thad Jones	6:50
5.	"Six and Four"	Oliver Nelson	11:22

== Personnel ==
- Stanley Turrentine - tenor saxophone
- Thad Jones - flugelhorn (tracks 1–2, 4–5)
- Cedar Walton - piano
- Buster Williams - bass
- Mickey Roker - drums
