= Destination... Out! =

Studio album by Jackie McLean
- Released: November 1964
- Recorded: September 20, 1963
- Studio: Van Gelder, Englewood Cliffs, NJ
- Genre: Jazz, avant-garde jazz
- Length: 34:57
- Label: Blue Note; BST 84165
- Producer: Alfred Lion

Jackie McLean chronology
One Step Beyond (1963)	Destination... Out! (1964)	It's Time! (1964)

Destination... Out! is an album by American saxophonist Jackie McLean, recorded in 1963 and released on the Blue Note label. It is the second McLean album to feature Bobby Hutcherson on vibraphone and Grachan Moncur III on trombone. The rhythm section is completed by bassist Larry Ridley and drummer Roy Haynes.

== Reception ==
The AllMusic review by Thom Jurek stated: "Of all of McLean's Blue Note dates, so many of which are classic jazz recordings, Destination Out! stands as the one that reveals the true soulfulness and complexity of his writing, arranging, and 'singing' voice."

Professional ratings
Review scores
Source	Rating
AllMusic	5/5 stars
The Penguin Guide to Jazz Recordings	3.5/4 stars
The Rolling Stone Jazz Record Guide	5/5 stars

== Track listing ==
1. "Love and Hate" (Grachan Moncur III) - 8:25
2. "Esoteric" (Moncur) - 9:02
3. "Kahlil the Prophet" (Jackie McLean) - 10:23
4. "Riff Raff" (Moncur) - 7:07

== Personnel ==
- Jackie McLean - alto saxophone
- Grachan Moncur III - trombone
- Bobby Hutcherson - vibes
- Larry Ridley - bass
- Roy Haynes - drums
