= Grant Green discography =

- Studio albums: 30
- Soundtrack albums: 1
- Live albums: 3

This article presents the discography of the American jazz guitarist Grant Green (1935–1979).

== As leader ==
Year	Title	Peak chart positions			Label	Notes
Year	Title	US	US R&B	US Jazz	Label	Notes
1961	Grant's First Stand	―	―	―	Blue Note	
1961	Green Street	―	―	―	Blue Note	
1962	Sunday Mornin'	―	―	―	Blue Note	
1962	Grantstand	―	―	―	Blue Note	
1963	The Latin Bit	―	―	―	Blue Note	
1963	Feelin' the Spirit	―	―	―	Blue Note	
1964	Am I Blue	―	―	―	Blue Note	
1965	Idle Moments	―	―	―	Blue Note	
1965	Talkin' About!	―	―	―	Blue Note	
1965	His Majesty King Funk	―	―	―	Verve	Reissued on CD in 1995 (Verve/Polygram 527474).
1966	I Want to Hold Your Hand	―	―	―	Blue Note	
1967	Street of Dreams	―	―	―	Blue Note	
1969	Goin' West	―	―	―	Blue Note	
1970	Carryin' On	―	49	―	Blue Note	
1970	Green Is Beautiful	―	24	―	Blue Note	
1970	Alive!	―	―	―	Blue Note	Live album
1971	Visions	151	31	5	Blue Note	
1972	Shades of Green	―	―	9	Blue Note	
1972	The Final Comedown	―	―	―	Blue Note	Soundtrack album of The Final Comedown (1972)
1972	Live at The Lighthouse	―	―	12	Blue Note	Live album. LA series.
1972	Iron City!	―	―	―	Cobblestone	Re-released in 1977 (Muse MR 5120); reissued on CD in 1998 (32 Jazz 32048), and again in 2003 (Savoy 17227).
1976	The Main Attraction	―	―	20	Kudu	Reissued on CD in 2002 (Epic/Legacy 86145).
1978	Easy	―	―	45	Versatile	Reissued on CD in 2001 (Unidisc UBK 4111), and again in 2007 (Essential Media Group 11025).
1979	Matador	―	―	―	Blue Note	Japan only
1979	Solid	―	―	―	Blue Note	LT series
1980	Remembering	―	―	―	Blue Note	Japan only. Reissued on CD as Standards (1998).
1980	Gooden's Corner	―	―	―	Blue Note	Japan only. Included in compilation album The Complete Quartets with Sonny Clark (1997).
1980	Nigeria	―	―	―	Blue Note	LT series. Included in compilation album The Complete Quartets with Sonny Clark (1997).
1980	Oleo	―	―	―	Blue Note	Japan only. Included in compilation album The Complete Quartets with Sonny Clark (1997).
1985	Born to Be Blue	―	―	―	Blue Note	
1989	Reaching Out	―	―	―	Black Lion	Originally released in 1961 as Reaching Out by Dave Bailey Quintet (Jazztime JT 003); reissued in 1973 as Green Blues by Grant Green (Muse MR 5014); reissued on CD in 1989 as Reaching Out by Grant Green (Black Lion BLCD 760129).
1999	Blues for Lou	―	―	19	Blue Note	Connoisseur series
2001	First Session	―	―	―	Blue Note	Connoisseur series
2006	Live at Club Mozambique	―	―	―	Blue Note	Live album
"—" denotes releases that did not chart or were not released in that territory.

== As sideman ==
1959:

- Jimmy Forrest, All the Gin Is Gone (Delmark)
- Jimmy Forrest, Black Forrest (Delmark)

1960:

- Sam Lazar, Space Flight (Argo)
- Willie Dixon, Blues Roots Series, Vol. 12 (Chess)

1961:

- Lou Donaldson, Here 'Tis (Blue Note)
- Baby Face Willette, Face to Face (Blue Note)
- Baby Face Willette, Stop and Listen (Blue Note)
- Brother Jack McDuff, The Honeydripper (Prestige)
- Stanley Turrentine, Up at "Minton's" (Blue Note)
- Dave Bailey, Reaching Out (Jazztime)
- Hank Mobley, Workout (Blue Note)
- Horace Parlan, Up & Down (Blue Note)
- Brother Jack McDuff, Steppin' Out (Prestige)
- Brother Jack McDuff, Goodnight, It's Time to Go (Prestige)
- Stanley Turrentine, ZT's Blues (Blue Note)
- Lou Donaldson, A Man with a Horn (Blue Note)
- Sonny Red, The Mode (Jazzland)
- Sonny Red, Images (Jazzland)
- Ike Quebec, Blue & Sentimental (Blue Note)

1962:

- Joe Carroll, Man with a Happy Sound (Charlie Parker Records)
- Dodo Greene, My Hour of Need (Blue Note)
- Don Wilkerson, Elder Don (Blue Note)
- Don Wilkerson, Preach Brother! (Blue Note)
- Lou Donaldson, The Natural Soul (Blue Note)

1963:

- Lou Donaldson, Good Gracious! (Blue Note)
- Jimmy Smith, I'm Movin' On (Blue Note)
- Jimmy Smith, Special Guests (Blue Note [rel. 1984])
- Booker Ervin, Back from the Gig (Blue Note)
- Herbie Hancock, My Point of View (Blue Note)
- Horace Parlan, Happy Frame of Mind (Blue Note)
- "Big" John Patton, Along Came John (Blue Note)
- Gloria Coleman, Soul Sisters (Impulse!)
- Harold Vick, Steppin' Out! (Blue Note)
- "Big" John Patton, Blue John (Blue Note)
- Don Wilkerson, Shoutin' (Blue Note)
- George Braith, Two Souls in One (Blue Note)
- Mary Lou Williams, Black Christ of the Andes (Saba/MPS)
- George Braith, Soulstream (Blue Note)
- Bobby Hutcherson, The Kicker (Blue Note)

1964:

- Lee Morgan, Search for the New Land (Blue Note)
- George Braith, Extension (Blue Note)
- "Big" John Patton, The Way I Feel (Blue Note)
- Larry Young, Into Somethin' (Blue Note)
- Donald Byrd, I'm Tryin' to Get Home (Blue Note)

1965:

- Johnny Hodges & Wild Bill Davis, Joe's Blues (Verve)
- Johnny Hodges & Wild Bill Davis, Wings & Things (Verve)
- Grassella Oliphant, The Grass is Greener (Atlantic)
- "Big" John Patton, Oh Baby! (Blue Note)
- Art Blakey, Hold On, I'm Coming (Limelight)
- Lou Donaldson, Musty Rusty (Cadet)
- "Big" John Patton, Let 'em Roll (Blue Note)

1966:

- George Braith, Laughing Soul (Prestige)
- "Big" John Patton, Got a Good Thing Goin' (Blue Note)
- Stanley Turrentine, Rough 'n' Tumble (Blue Note)

1969:

- Rusty Bryant, Rusty Bryant Returns (Prestige)
- Charles Kynard, The Soul Brotherhood (Prestige)
- Reuben Wilson, Love Bug (Blue Note)
- Don Patterson, Brothers-4 (Prestige)
- Don Patterson, Donny Brook (Prestige)
- Don Patterson, Tune Up! (Prestige)

1970:

- Charles Kynard, Afro-Disiac (Prestige)
- Fats Theus, Black Out (CTI)
- Houston Person, Person to Person! (Prestige)

1973:

- Houston Person, The Real Thing (Eastbound)
