= Album covers of Blue Note Records =

Logo of Blue Note Records

The album covers of Blue Note Records, an American jazz record label, are recognized for their distinctive designs. Many feature a combination of bold colors, experimental typography, and candid photographs of the album's musicians, and have been described as belonging to the Bauhaus and Swiss Style movements.

In the early 1950s, the LP record format gained popularity, increasing the demand for album covers with graphics and information. During this time, artists like Gil Mellé, Paul Bacon, and John Hermansader began designing covers for Blue Note, often featuring pictures by photographer Francis Wolff. In 1956, Reid Miles, a former assistant to Hermansader, was hired as Blue Note's art director. Miles designed 400 to 500 album covers for the label, which used various typefaces, mixed letter cases, and design principles and techniques such as asymmetry and tinting.

Miles left Blue Note in 1967 following founder Alfred Lion's retirement; after Miles's departure, Forlenza Venosa Associates and other artists, including Mati Klarwein and Bob Venosa, designed many of the label's covers. The early to mid-1970s saw the work of designers such as Norman Seeff and Bob Cato featured on Blue Note covers, while in the late 1970s and early 1980s, the label's records were reissued in Japan with new covers designed by Japanese artists. From the mid-1980s through the early 21st century, a number of artists, including Paula Scher, P. R. Brown, and Adam Pendleton, contributed to the cover designs for the label's releases.

The Blue Note album covers, particularly those designed by Miles, have been highly regarded and considered definitive of jazz's visual identity. Critics have praised the covers' designs as iconic and noted their ability to capture the spirit of the musicians and their music. The style of these covers has inspired several graphic designers and musicians, influencing a wide range of album art and other visual media.

== Background ==
Blue Note Records is an American jazz record label founded in March 1939 in New York City by German immigrant Alfred Lion. The label initially comprised Lion and writer Max Margulis, who provided funding and copywriting services. Blue Note's first releases were Dixieland "hot" and boogie-woogie-style jazz, and featured acts such as Albert Ammons, Frankie Newton, and J. C. Higginbotham. The label's first hit record was a version of George Gershwin's "Summertime" recorded by saxophonist Sidney Bechet.

Lion's friend, photographer Francis Wolff, joined the label in October 1939 and headed the business during Lion's military service in the early 1940s, distributing Blue Note records through the wholesale division at producer Milt Gabler's Commodore Music Shop. Following Lion's return in November 1943, the label began to embrace the increasingly popular bebop style of jazz, releasing records from musicians such as Ike Quebec and Thelonious Monk in the mid-1940s.

== History ==
=== 1951–1956: Early years ===
The cover of Wynton Kelly's Piano Interpretations (1951) features a photograph taken by Francis Wolff, and was designed by Gil Mellé.

At almost every Blue Note recording session, Wolff took candid photographs of the musicians as they played, seeking to capture honest and unrehearsed moments. Though they were taken primarily for personal reasons rather than marketing purposes, the black-and-white photographs were used infrequently in Blue Note advertising material, publicity photos, and on record sleeves. However, with the growing popularity of 10-inch (25 cm) LP records in the late 1940s and early 1950s came an increased demand for detailed album covers with graphics and information, replacing the plain paper sleeves that were previously common. As a result, Wolff's photos were featured on more of Blue Note's covers after the label began issuing 10-inch LPs in 1951.

One of the first appearances of Wolff's photographs on a Blue Note album cover was on Wynton Kelly's album Piano Interpretations (1951), which was designed by saxophonist Gil Mellé. Graphic designers Paul Bacon and John Hermansader also incorporated Wolff's photos in their designs, such as those for Monk's Genius of Modern Music, Vol. 1 (1952) and Bud Powell's The Amazing Bud Powell (1952). While the album covers during this period used Wolff's photography, the textual information and designs featured on the covers were prioritized over the inclusion of images.

Bacon and Hermansader created most of Blue Note's covers throughout the early to mid-1950s, including Dizzy Gillespie's Horn of Plenty (1953), Powell's The Amazing Bud Powell, Vol. 2 (1953), and the Jazz Messengers's At the Cafe Bohemia (1956). Their designs, which balanced fanciful typography with Wolff's pictures, would later serve as inspiration for the work of designer Reid Miles, then an assistant to Hermansader.

=== 1956–1967: The Reid Miles era ===
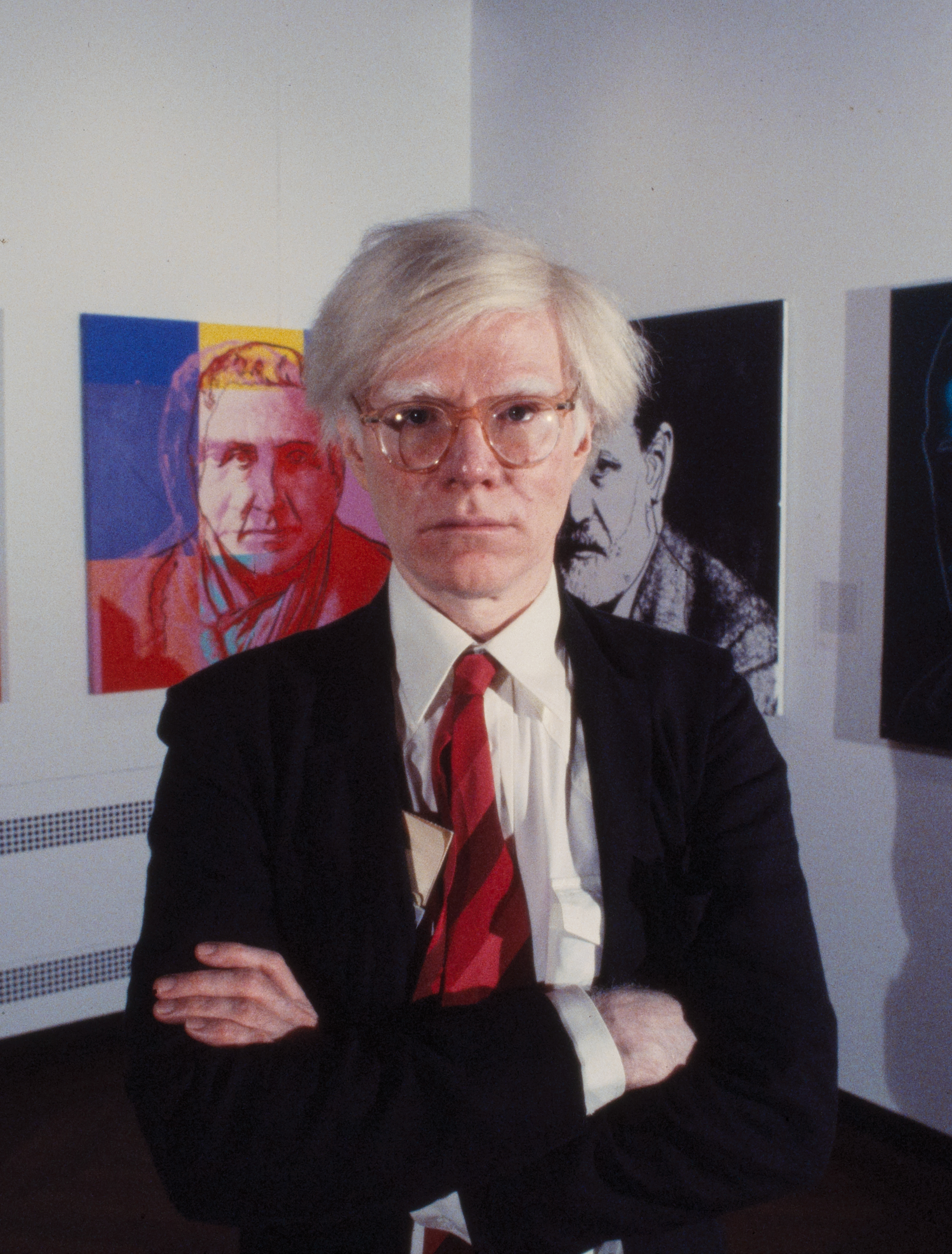
The cover of Johnny Griffin's The Congregation (1958) features an illustration from Andy Warhol (pictured in 1980).

In the mid-1950s, Blue Note began issuing 12-inch (30 cm) LPs after previously being unable to afford to adopt the format. In 1956, Miles, now working in the art department of Esquire magazine after leaving Hermansader's studio in the same year, was hired by Wolff as Blue Note's art director, and was tasked with designing the covers for the early 12-inch releases. (Note: John Hermansader designed the covers of the first eight 12-inch releases.) Wolff and Blue Note founder Alfred Lion had been impressed by Miles's work at the label in the year and a half before his exit, which included co-design credits on the cover of Miles Davis's Volumes 1 & 2 (1956) with Hermansader. Miles, a fan of classical music, was not interested in jazz and relied solely on Lion's descriptions of the music on the albums to design their covers. He was paid $50 (equivalent to $441 in 2024) for each cover he made.

Miles's first 12-inch designs were for reissues of Milt Jackson's Milt Jackson and the Thelonious Monk Quintet (1956) and the two volumes of Monk's Genius of Modern Music (1956). He continued designing for Blue Note throughout the late 1950s and early 1960s, employing a number of techniques across the covers; on some, he made minimal edits to Wolff's portraits, such as on the cover of John Coltrane's Blue Train (1957), while on others he included photographs of objects, as seen on Hank Mobley's Peckin' Time (1958) and Jackie McLean's Jackie's Bag (1961), which depict a red suitcase and a string-tied file folder, respectively. The latter album was nominated for a Grammy Award for Best Album Cover – Other Than Classical at the 4th Grammy Awards. For some designs, he collaborated with then-unknown artist Andy Warhol, whose illustrations appeared on the covers of Johnny Griffin's The Congregation (1958) and Kenny Burrell's Kenny Burrell, Volume 2 (1957) and Blue Lights, Vols. 1 & 2 (1958). Miles also designed the covers for albums such as Baby Face Willette's Face to Face (1961) and Andrew Hill's Smoke Stack (1963) during this time.

In 1963, Miles was hired as the art director of Columbia Records by company president Goddard Lieberson but was still allowed to design for Blue Note. In the following years, he became more experimental with his typography, sometimes omitting photos entirely, such as on the cover of Larry Young's Unity (1966). He would also design covers for Eric Dolphy's Out to Lunch! (1964), Tony Williams's Spring (1965), Horace Silver's The Jody Grind (1966), and Cecil Taylor's Unit Structures (1966). Miles later began to take photographs himself; a picture of a woman, taken by Miles, is shown on the cover of Lou Donaldson's Alligator Bogaloo (1967). Simultaneously, additional designers and artists, including Bob Fuentes and Ornette Coleman, began creating covers for Blue Note. Coleman, a saxophonist for the label who also painted, contributed his artwork to the cover of his album The Empty Foxhole (1966).

Lion sold Blue Note to Liberty Records in 1965 and soon became dissatisfied with the pressures of the corporate system. This frustration, coupled with heart problems, prompted his retirement from the label in 1967. Following Lion's departure, Miles also left, as Liberty's marketing team became more involved in the design process. During his eleven-year tenure as art director at Blue Note, Miles designed 400 to 500 covers. (Note: Sources vary on the number of covers Reid Miles designed for Blue Note. The Los Angeles Times states that Miles created "about 400 album covers for Blue Note". Estelle Caswell of Vox states that "Miles designed well over 500 album covers for Blue Note between the mid-'50s and late '60s". David Hinckley of the New York Daily News states that Miles made "500-plus LPs over... 11 years" for the label. Steven Heller and Greg D'Onofrio state that Miles designed "nearly five hundred covers".)

=== 1967–present: Post-Miles era ===
After Miles left Blue Note in 1967, many of the label's covers were designed by Forlenza Venosa Associates, whose works included McLean's 'Bout Soul (1967), Bobby Hutcherson's Total Eclipse (1967), Donaldson's Midnight Creeper (1968), John Patton's That Certain Feeling (1968), and Silver's Serenade to a Soul Sister (1968). Tony De Stefano was credited with the design of Elvin Jones's The Ultimate (1968). Artist Mati Klarwein designed the cover of Reuben Wilson's Blue Mode (1970), which features artwork from painter Bob Venosa. Venosa also created cover designs, such as those for Mobley's The Flip (1969) and McLean's Demon's Dance (1970).

Blue Note covers in the early 1970s featured designs by Eileen Anderson, whose work appears on the cover of Donald Byrd's Black Byrd (1973), and Norman Seeff, whose cover design on Ronnie Foster's Two Headed Freap (1973) incorporates photography from Al Vandenberg. The mid-1970s saw graphic designer Bob Cato create the covers of Hutcherson's Montara (1975) and Ronnie Laws's Pressure Sensitive (1975). In the late 1970s and early 1980s, the Japanese record company King Records, along with other Japanese labels, began reissuing Blue Note records domestically. These reissues, which included Dexter Gordon's Clubhouse (1979), Art Blakey's Pisces (1980), and Grant Green's Oleo (1980) and Nigeria (1981), featured illustrations, photographs, and designs from Japanese artists such as Toshikazu Tanaka, Akiyoshi Miyashita, K. Abe, and T. Fujiyama.

In the mid-1980s, Richard Mantel and Terry Koppel designed the covers of Hank Mobley's Far Away Lands (1984) and Grant Green's Born to Be Blue (1985), respectively, while Paula Scher created the cover of Bobby McFerrin's Spontaneous Inventions (1986). In the early 1990s, Tommy Steele was credited with the design for Dianne Reeves's I Remember (1992), Mark Larson made the cover of Cassandra Wilson's Blue Light 'til Dawn (1993), and Eric Baker Design Associates worked on the cover art of Joe Lovano's Rush Hour (1994). Patrick Roques created several Blue Note covers in the mid-1990s, including those of Hutcherson's Patterns (1995), Mobley's A Slice of the Top (1995), and Wayne Shorter's Et Cetera (1995). The late 1990s saw Bleu Valdimer of Project Dragon design the cover for Medeski Martin & Wood's Combustication (1998), and P. R. Brown for Jason Moran's Soundtrack to Human Motion (1999).

Designers of Blue Note album covers in the 21st century include Jessica Novod Berenblat, who is credited with art direction and design for the covers of Norah Jones's Come Away with Me (2002) and Feels like Home (2004). Jeff Jank designed the cover of Madlib's Shades of Blue: Madlib Invades Blue Note (2003), while conceptual artist Adam Pendleton worked on the cover of Moran's Ten (2010). Designer J.C. Pagán designed the cover of Robert Glasper's Black Radio 2 (2013), which features photography by Janette Beckman.

== Style and composition ==
The cover of Kenny Dorham's Una Mas (1963) was designed around Dorham's pose in the featured photo.

Miles is credited with developing the style of Blue Note's album covers and shaping the label's overall visual identity. His covers have been described as belonging to the Bauhaus and Swiss Style movements. They are generally characterized by their use of bold colors like ochre, vermilion, and indigo, and visual design techniques and principles such as contrast, negative space, asymmetry, and tinting. Some covers feature abstract artwork with blocks of colors and shapes, as seen on Sonny Clark's Sonny Clark Trio (1959). The typography varies between upper and lower case lettering and employs a wide range of typefaces, including sans-serif and calligraphic fonts, the latter of which are seen on the covers of Lee Morgan's Lee Morgan Indeed! (1956) and Dizzy Reece's Soundin' Off (1960). Some covers from the mid-1960s show a more experimental typographic style, such as those of McLean's It's Time! (1964), which contains multiple exclamation marks in a black type on a white background, and Joe Henderson's In 'n Out (1964), which integrates arrow symbols into the text. At times, personnel or track listings are omitted from Blue Note cover designs.

The covers, especially those from the mid-20th century, are often supplemented by Wolff's photography, which appeared on hundreds of Blue Note album covers. On several covers, Wolff's pictures are cropped for accentuation, such as on the covers of Monk's Genius of Modern Music (1956) and McLean's It's Time! (1964), or are used as canvasses for typography. For the cover of Kenny Dorham's Una Mas (1963), the album's title is positioned to fit in the space between Dorham's index finger and thumb; similar methods of arranging text around the cover image's contents can be seen on the covers of Freddie Roach's Good Move! (1963) and Gordon's Our Man in Paris (1963).

Later covers are mostly distinguished by their use of illustrations, as seen on those of the Japanese Blue Note reissues and the work of Klarwein and Venosa. Some cover designs in the mid-1980s and 1990s continued to feature Wolff's photographs, such as those designed by Roques. Others were directly inspired by the style of past Blue Note artwork; the cover of Moran's Ten (2010) features ten black dots and the label's logo without the title or the artist's name, a creative decision he stated was a tribute to "classic Blue Note". The covers of Madlib's Shades of Blue: Madlib Invades Blue Note (2003) and Van Morrison's What's Wrong with This Picture? (2003) have also been noted as homages to the label's early art style.

== Reception and impact ==
The cover of singer Joe Jackson's Body and Soul (1984, left) was inspired by the cover of Sonny Rollins's Sonny Rollins, Vol. 2 (1957, right).

The Blue Note album covers, particularly those designed by Reid Miles, have been described as being definitive of the visual identity of jazz, serving as a symbol of the genre's imagery. In a 2019 Vox article, Estelle Caswell praised the covers as iconic and considered them to be "the 'look' of jazz", while in 2005 David Hinckley of the New York Daily News called Miles a "visionary" and highlighted his adeptness in capturing the essence of the artists when using Wolff's photography on his covers. Design writers Steven Heller and Greg D'Onofrio stated in their 2017 book The Moderns that Blue Note's covers were consistently innovative, and commended their ability to accurately convey the spirit of the music. Dave Gelly of The Observer wrote in 1999 that the Blue Note covers were classics, and commented:

Every album cover was tantalizing, with its bold, futuristic design and a photo of the artist slotted into the pattern, like an icon. Sometimes the picture was tiny, squeezed up into one of the letters of the title; sometimes it was cropped into a weird shape; sometimes it was a great, big, handsome portrait. Blue Note bathed its artists in glamour. They were heroes. They seemed to inhabit a charmed world and who would not yearn to be part of it?

Several graphic designers and musicians have used the style of Blue Note's album covers as inspiration for their own work. A project by artist Logan Walters featured the album covers of Wu-Tang Clan reimagined in the Blue Note style. Designs featuring portraits of US president Barack Obama have emulated those of the label's covers. In a 2014 interview with the Kennedy Center, Blue Note president Don Was noted that the logo for Late Night with Jimmy Fallon resembled a Blue Note album cover. The album art of other musicians has been influenced by Blue Note's covers, including Elvis Costello's Almost Blue (1981), whose cover is an homage to Burrell's Midnight Blue (1963), Van Morrison's The Skiffle Sessions – Live in Belfast (1998), which has a cover inspired by Blakey's Free for All (1965), and Aesop Rock's Float (2000), whose cover features a design reminiscent of Taylor's Conquistador! (1968).

== See also ==
- Cover art
- Blue Note Records discography
