= The Complete Quartets with Sonny Clark =

Compilation album by Grant Green
- Released: 1997
- Recorded: December 23, 1961 (CD 1, 8–10; CD2 1–3); January 13, 1962 (CD 1, 1–7); January 31, 1962 (CD 2, 4–9)
- Studio: Van Gelder Studio, Englewood Cliffs
- Genre: Jazz
- Length: 134:59
- Label: Blue Note
- Producer: Alfred Lion, Michael Cuscuna

Professional ratings
Review scores
Source	Rating
Allmusic	5/5 stars
The Penguin Guide to Jazz	4/4 stars

The Complete Quartets With Sonny Clark is a 1997 compilation album by jazz guitarist Grant Green, collecting together all the tracks from a series of albums he recorded with pianist Sonny Clark in 1961 and '62.

The original material was shelved until after Clark's death in 1963 and Grant's death in 1979, and was first issued only in Japan as the albums Nigeria, Oleo and Gooden's Corner. The collection also includes one additional tune, "Nancy (With the Laughing Face)", and alternative takes of "Airegin" and "Oleo", all recorded during the same sessions.

It is not to be confused with a 1990 collection from Mosaic Records, The Complete Blue Note Recordings Of Grant Green With Sonny Clark, which features all the quartet sessions plus the quintet session that became the 1985 Born to Be Blue album.

== Reception ==
The Penguin Guide to Jazz selected this album as part of its suggested Core Collection. A review by Stephen Thomas Erlewine of Allmusic.com stated, "this is superb music, showcasing the guitarist and pianist at their very best." Writing for All About Jazz, Reid Thompson described the album as "full of intuition, soul, and swing, and lacking in pretense," going on to say that the album "has me asking myself 'does music get any better than this?'"

== Track listing ==
=== Disc one ===
1. "Airegin" (Sonny Rollins) – 7:32
2. "It Ain't Necessarily So" (George Gershwin, Ira Gershwin) – 10:22
3. "I Concentrate on You" (Cole Porter) – 5:48
4. "The Things We Did Last Summer" (Sammy Cahn, Jule Styne) – 5:56
5. "The Song Is You" (Oscar Hammerstein II, Jerome Kern) – 7:46
6. "Nancy (With the Laughing Face)" (Jimmy Van Heusen, Phil Silvers) – 6:25
7. "Airegin" [Alternative Take] – 7:37
8. "On Green Dolphin Street" (Bronislau Kaper, Ned Washington) – 6:26
9. "Shadrack" (Robert MacGimsey) – 6:23
10. "What Is This Thing Called Love?" (Cole Porter) – 5:50

=== Disc two ===
1. "Moon River" (Henry Mancini, Johnny Mercer) – 5:37
2. "Gooden's Corner" – 8:14
3. "Two for One" – 7:41
4. "Oleo" (Sonny Rollins) – 5:37
5. "Little Girl Blue" (Lorenz Hart, Richard Rodgers) – 7:15
6. "Tune Up" (Eddie Vinson) – 7:19
7. "Hip Funk" (Green) – 8:39
8. "My Favorite Things" (Oscar Hammerstein II, Richard Rodgers) – 8:32
9. "Oleo" [Alternative Take] – 6:00

== Personnel ==
- Grant Green - guitar
- Sonny Clark - piano
- Sam Jones - bass
- Art Blakey - drums (disc one, tracks 1–7)
- Louis Hayes - drums (all other tracks)
