= Gooden's Corner =

Studio album by Grant Green
- Released: 1980
- Recorded: December 23, 1961
- Studio: Van Gelder Studio, Englewood Cliffs
- Genre: Jazz
- Length: 40:11
- Label: Blue Note; GXF 3058
- Producer: Alfred Lion

Grant Green chronology
Remembering (1961)	Gooden's Corner (1980)	Nigeria (1962)

Gooden's Corner is an album by American jazz guitarist Grant Green featuring performances recorded in 1961 and released on the Japanese Blue Note label in 1980. Green is featured in a quartet with pianist Sonny Clark, bassist Sam Jones and drummer Louis Hayes. The tracks were also released in 1997 as part of The Complete Quartets with Sonny Clark.

== Reception ==
Professional ratings
Review scores
Source	Rating
Allmusic	4.5/5 stars

The Allmusic review by Michael Erlewine awarded the album 4½ stars and stated "This is an album of real beauty and synergy between Green and pianist Sonny Clark".

== Track listing ==
All compositions by Grant Green except as indicated.

1. "On Green Dolphin Street" (Bronislau Kaper, Ned Washington) - 6:26
2. "Shadrack" (Robert MacGimsey) - 6:23
3. "What Is This Thing Called Love?" (Cole Porter) - 5:50
4. "Moon River" (Henry Mancini, Johnny Mercer) - 5:37
5. "Gooden's Corner" - 8:14
6. "Two for One" - 7:41

== Personnel ==
- Grant Green - guitar
- Sonny Clark - piano
- Sam Jones - bass
- Louis Hayes - drums
