= Live at The Lighthouse (Grant Green album) =

Live album by Grant Green
- Released: February 1973
- Recorded: April 21, 1972
- Genre: Jazz-funk
- Length: 71:05
- Label: Blue Note

Grant Green chronology
The Final Comedown (1971)	Live at The Lighthouse (1973)	The Main Attraction (1976)

Live at The Lighthouse is a live album by American jazz guitarist Grant Green featuring a performance recorded at the Lighthouse Café in Hermosa Beach, California in 1972 and released on the Blue Note label.

== Reception ==
Professional ratings
Review scores
Source	Rating
Allmusic	4/5 stars
The Penguin Guide to Jazz Recordings	3/4 stars

The Allmusic review by Steve Huey awarded the album 4 stars and stated "Some of Grant Green's hottest moments as a jazz-funk bandleader came on his live records of the era, which were filled with extended, smoking grooves and gritty ensemble interplay. Live at the Lighthouse makes a fine companion piece to the excellent Alive!, though there are some subtle differences which give the album its own distinct flavor".

== Track listing ==
1. Introduction by Hank Stewart - 2:30
2. "Windjammer" (Neal Creque) - 12:15
3. "Betcha by Golly, Wow" (Thom Bell, Linda Creed) - 7:41
4. "Fancy Free" (Donald Byrd) - 14:44
5. "Flood in Franklin Park" (Shelton Laster) - 15:00
6. "Jan Jan" (Mose Davis) - 12:18
7. "Walk in the Night" (Johnny Bristol, Marilyn McLeod) - 6:37

- Recorded at the Lighthouse Café in Hermosa Beach, California on April 21, 1972

== Personnel ==
- Grant Green - guitar
- Claude Bartee - soprano saxophone, tenor saxophone
- Gary Coleman - vibes
- Shelton Laster - organ
- Wilton Felder - electric bass
- Greg Williams - drums
- Bobbye Porter Hall - percussion
- Hank Stewart - announcer
