= Clarence Palmer =

American jazz musician

Clarence M. Palmer (October 6, 1943 Princeton, West Virginia) is an American jazz organist.

After initially learning gospel piano, Palmer switched to jazz organ upon hearing the early 1960s Jimmy Smith approach to the instrument which was then gaining in popularity. Palmer appeared frequently as a sideman with various recording artists in 1960s and 1970s, chiefly Grant Green, George Benson, and Fats Theus. Today he presents various ensembles under his own leadership. His most commercially successful recording was with Benson on the 1971 CTI release, Beyond the Blue Horizon.

== Discography ==
With George Benson

- Beyond the Blue Horizon (CTI, 1971)

With Grant Green

- Carryin' On (Blue Note, 1969)

With Fats Theus

- Blackout (CTI, 1970)
