= Remembering (Grant Green album) =

Studio album by Grant Green
- Released: 1980
- Recorded: August 29, 1961
- Studio: Van Gelder Studio, Englewood Cliffs, NJ
- Genre: Jazz
- Length: 57:11 CD reissue
- Label: Blue Note; GXF 3071
- Producer: Alfred Lion

Grant Green chronology
Grantstand (1961)	Remembering (1980)	Gooden's Corner (1961)

Alternative cover
- CD reissue (1998)

Remembering is an album by American jazz guitarist Grant Green featuring performances recorded in 1961 but not released until 1980 on the Japanese Blue Note label. Green is supported by bassist Wilbur Ware and drummer Al Harewood. The US CD reissue was released in 1998 (renamed Standards) and included an alternate take and an additional track recorded at the same sessions.

== Reception ==
Professional ratings
Review scores
Source	Rating
AllMusic	4/5 stars
The Penguin Guide to Jazz	3.5/4 stars

The AllMusic review (of Standards) by Scott Yanow awarded the album 4 stars and stated, "Grant Green is heard in prime form in a sparse trio... Recommended".

Jazz journalists Richard Cook and Brian Morton rated this album in their "Penguin Guide to Jazz" as an excellent record, with some minor reservations stating: "Green had on occasion expressed a special preference for the uncluttered sound of a guitar, bass, drums trio, rather than one with organ, and one sees what he means here. The pace is light, fat and dancing, and Ware's solos are models of invention. A pity about anomalies in the sound, which seem to have arisen when the tapes were remastered in 1980."

== Track listing ==
1. "You Stepped Out of a Dream" (Nacio Herb Brown, Gus Kahn) – 4:59 [Additional track on CD reissue]
2. "Love Walked In" (George Gershwin, Ira Gershwin) – 6:34
3. "If I Had You" (Irving King) – 7:10
4. "I'll Remember April" (Gene de Paul, Patricia Johnston, Don Raye) – 9:09
5. "You and the Night and the Music" (Howard Dietz, Arthur Schwartz) – 8:16
6. "All the Things You Are" (Oscar Hammerstein II, Jerome Kern) – 8:16
7. "I Remember You" (Johnny Mercer, Victor Schertzinger) – 5:37
8. "If I Had You" [Alternate take] – 7:10 [Bonus track on CD reissue]

== Personnel ==
- Grant Green – guitar
- Wilbur Ware – bass
- Al Harewood – drums
