= William Durkin =

William Durkin may refer to:

- William Durkin (basketball) (1922–2012), American professional basketball player
- William Durkin (footballer) (1921–2000), English professional footballer
- William L. Durkin (1916–2006), American soldier
