= Here 'Tis =

Studio album by Lou Donaldson
- Released: 1961
- Recorded: January 23, 1961
- Studio: Van Gelder Studio, Englewood Cliffs, New Jersey
- Genre: Jazz
- Length: 39:13
- Label: Blue Note BST 84066
- Producer: Alfred Lion

Lou Donaldson chronology
Midnight Sun (1960)	Here 'Tis (1961)	Gravy Train (1961)

Professional ratings
Review scores
Source	Rating
AllMusic	4.5/5 stars
All About Jazz	(favorable)

Here 'Tis is an album by jazz saxophonist Lou Donaldson recorded for the Blue Note label in 1961 and performed by Donaldson with organist Baby Face Willette, guitarist Grant Green and drummer Dave Bailey.

== Reception ==
An AllMusic review by Stephen Thomas Erlewine states: "Here 'Tis is in the front rank of Lou Donaldson records, an exceptionally funky soul-jazz session that finds the saxophonist swinging harder than usual. As he moves from hard bop to soul-jazz, Donaldson reveals a bluesy streak to his playing while keeping the vigorous attack that defined his best bop. Donaldson's playing is among his finest in the soul-jazz vein, but what makes Here 'Tis such an enjoyable session is his interaction with his supporting trio... As support, all three know how to keep a groove gritty and flexible, following Lou's lead and working a swinging beat that keeps flowing, never growing static... Their talent, combined with Donaldson at a peak, results in a terrific record".

== Track listing ==
All compositions by Lou Donaldson except where noted.

1. "A Foggy Day" (George Gershwin, Ira Gershwin) – 6:38
2. "Here 'Tis" – 9:25
3. "Cool Blues" (Charlie Parker) – 6:53
4. "Watusi Jump" – 7:32
5. "Walk Wid Me" – 8:36

- Recorded at the Van Gelder Studio, Englewood Cliffs, New Jersey, on January 23, 1961.

== Personnel ==
- Lou Donaldson – alto saxophone
- Baby Face Willette – organ
- Grant Green – guitar
- Dave Bailey – drums
