= Up at "Minton's" =

- Volume 1

Live album by Stanley Turrentine
- Released: 1961
- Recorded: February 23, 1961
- Venue: Minton's Playhouse, NYC
- Genre: Jazz
- Length: 88:47
- Label: Blue Note; BLP 4069 (Vol. 1); BLP 4070 (Vol. 2)
- Producer: Alfred Lion

Stanley Turrentine chronology
Comin' Your Way (1961)	Up at "Minton's" (1961)	Dearly Beloved (1961)

Up at "Minton's"
- Volume 2

Up at "Minton's", Vols. 1 & 2 are a pair of separate but related live albums by American jazz saxophonist Stanley Turrentine recorded on February 23, 1961 and released on Blue Note later that year. The quintet features rhythm section Grant Green, Horace Parlan, George Tucker, and Al Harewood. The album was later as a double CD set.

== Reception ==
Professional ratings
Review scores
Source	Rating
AllMusic	4.5/5 stars
The Penguin Guide to Jazz Recordings	3.5/4 stars

The AllMusic review by Scott Yanow states, "Standards and a couple of blues make up the repertoire, giving listeners a definitive look at the soulful Mr. T. near the beginning of his productive musical life."

== Track listing ==
=== Up at "Minton's", Volume 1 ===
All tracks are written by Stanley Turrentine, except as noted.

Side 1
No.	Title	Writer(s)	Length
1.	"But Not for Me"	George Gershwin; Ira Gershwin	11:29
2.	"Stanley's Time"		11:03

Side 2
No.	Title	Writer(s)	Length
1.	"Broadway"	Billy Bird; Teddy McRae; Henri Woode	10:38
2.	"Yesterdays"	Otto Harbach; Jerome Kern	11:39

=== Up at "Minton's", Volume 2 ===
All tracks are written by Stanley Turrentine, except as noted.

Side 1
No.	Title	Writer(s)	Length
1.	"Later at Minton's"		13:55
2.	"Come Rain or Come Shine"	Harold Arlen; Johnny Mercer	8:34

Side 2
No.	Title	Writer(s)	Length
1.	"Love for Sale"	Cole Porter	15:11
2.	"Summertime"	Gershwin; Gershwin; DuBose Heyward	7:14

== Personnel ==
- Stanley Turrentine – tenor saxophone
- Grant Green – guitar
- Horace Parlan – piano
- George Tucker – bass
- Al Harewood – drums

=== Technical personnel ===
- Alfred Lion – producer
- Rudy Van Gelder – recording engineer
- Reid Miles – design
- Francis Wolff – photography
