= Goin' West =

Studio album by Grant Green
- Released: May 1969
- Recorded: November 30, 1962
- Studio: Van Gelder Studio, Englewood Cliffs
- Genre: Jazz
- Length: 34:12
- Label: Blue Note; BST 84310
- Producer: Alfred Lion

Grant Green chronology
The Latin Bit (1962)	Goin' West (1969)	Feelin' the Spirit (1962)

Goin' West is an album by American jazz guitarist Grant Green featuring performances recorded in 1962 but not released on the Blue Note label until 1969. It is a loose concept album inspired by Western music. It features pianist Herbie Hancock, bassist Reggie Workman and drummer Billy Higgins.

== Reception ==
Professional ratings
Review scores
Source	Rating
AllMusic	3/5 stars
The Penguin Guide to Jazz Recordings	3/4 stars

The AllMusic review by Michael Erlewine states, "Only Green could carry this off, but he is the man when it comes to standards".

The All About Jazz review by Colin Fleming stated "Goin' West, though nominally a country and western recording, moves us into the realm of folk music—bluegrass folk music and clippity-clappity cowboy tunes... Having said that, it would be hard to imagine Goin' West being a greater delight, a straight forward, unencumbered jazz delight—finesse jazz is a readily applicable moniker... Goin' West is an intriguing release nonetheless".

== Track listing ==
1. "On Top of Old Smokey" (Traditional) – 7:05
2. "I Can't Stop Loving You" (Don Gibson) – 3:29
3. "Wagon Wheels" (Peter DeRose, Billy Hill) – 6:25
4. "Red River Valley" (Traditional) – 6:08
5. "Tumbling Tumbleweeds" (Bob Nolan) – 11:05

== Personnel ==
- Grant Green - guitar
- Herbie Hancock - piano
- Reggie Workman - bass
- Billy Higgins - drums
