= Easy (Grant Green album) =

Studio album by Grant Green
- Released: 1978
- Recorded: April 17–20, 1978
- Genre: Jazz
- Label: Versatile

Grant Green chronology
The Main Attraction (1976)	Easy (1978)

Easy (also released as Last Session) is the final album by American jazz guitarist Grant Green featuring performances recorded in 1978, a few months before his death, and released on the Versatile label.

== Reception ==
Professional ratings
Review scores
Source	Rating
Allmusic	3/5 stars
The Penguin Guide to Jazz Recordings	2/4 stars

The Allmusic review by awarded the album 3 stars.

== Track listing ==
1. "Easy" (Lionel Richie) - 7:57
2. "Just the Way You Are" (Billy Joel) - 7:11
3. "Wave" (Antônio Carlos Jobim) - 6:07
4. "Empanada" (Gene Dunlap, Mario E. Sprouse) - 12:19
5. "Nighttime in the Switching Yard" (Jorge Calderón, David Lindell) - 5:11
6. "Three Times a Lady" (Lionel Richie) - 7:07
  - Recorded in New York City on April 17–20, 1978

== Personnel ==
- Grant Green - guitar
- Jon Faddis, Lew Soloff - trumpet, flugelhorn
- Janice Robinson, Kiane Zawadi - trombone
- Karen Joseph - piccolo, flute, alto flute
- Hank Crawford - alto saxophone, baritone saxophone
- Jorge Dalto - piano, electric piano
- Mario E. Sprouse - electric piano (track 6)
- Wayne Morrison - guitar, electric guitar
- Buster Williams - bass, electric bass
- Dough Wilson - drums
- Shanimba - percussion
- Unidentified strings
