= Preach Brother! =

Studio album by Don Wilkerson
- Released: 1962
- Recorded: June 18, 1962
- Studio: Van Gelder Studio, Englewood Cliffs, NJ
- Genre: Jazz
- Length: 37:06
- Label: Blue Note; BST 84107
- Producer: Alfred Lion

Don Wilkerson chronology
Elder Don (1962)	Preach Brother! (1962)	Shoutin' (1963)

Preach Brother! is an album by American saxophonist Don Wilkerson recorded in 1962 and released on the Blue Note label.

== Reception ==
Professional ratings
Review scores
Source	Rating
Allmusic	4/5 stars

The Allmusic review by Stephen Thomas Erlewine awarded the album 4 stars and stated, "The result is another fine record that proves Wilkerson was one of the best, hardest-hitting soul-jazz saxophonists of the early '60s".

== Track listing ==
All compositions by Don Wilkerson

1. "Jeanie-Weenie" - 5:01
2. "Homesick Blues" - 6:40
3. "Dem Tambourines" - 5:38
4. "Camp Meetin'" - 4:44
5. "The Eldorado Shuffle" - 6:28
6. "Pigeon Peas" - 8:35

== Personnel ==
- Don Wilkerson - tenor saxophone, tambourine
- Sonny Clark - piano
- Grant Green - guitar
- Butch Warren - bass
- Billy Higgins - drums
- Jual Curtis - tambourine (tracks 3–4)
