= Paul Bacon (designer) =

American designer

- Born: December 25, 1923; Ossining, New York, U.S.
- Died: June 8, 2015 (aged 91); Beacon, New York, U.S.

Paul Bacon (December 25, 1923 – June 8, 2015) was an American book and album cover designer and jazz musician. He is known for introducing the "Big Book Look" in book jacket design, and designed about 6,500 jackets and more than 200 jazz record covers.

== Personal life ==
Paul Bacon was born December 25, 1923, in Ossining, New York. Bacon's family lived in many places in the New York City area while he was growing up due to economic hardships caused by the Great Depression. The family settled in Newark, New Jersey, in 1939, where Bacon graduated from Newark Arts High School in 1940. Bacon's introduction to jazz was through the radio. "My brother and I realized we were jazz fans after hearing Benny Goodman on the Camel Caravan show in 1935," Bacon said. In Newark they were members of a "hot club," a group of teens who listened to and talked about jazz.

After high school, Bacon took a design job with Scheck Advertising, a small ad agency in Newark. He was drafted in 1943 and joined the Marine Corps. With the Marines he was sent to Guadalcanal, Guam, and China, never seeing any action.

He was discharged in 1946 and returned to Union Beach, New Jersey, where his family had moved. Shortly afterward he moved to New York City. He later married his roommate's cousin, Maxine Shirey, a dancer in Charles Weidman's house company for the City Center Opera in New York. Bacon died on June 8, 2015, aged 91, in Beacon, New York.

== Design career ==
Bacon's design career got its start with drawings for small magazines such as The Newark Hot Club's Jazz Notes and Bob Thiele's Jazz before he was drafted into the Marines. After the war he worked for Hal Zamboni at his design studio, Zamboni Associates, in Manhattan, for about nine years. In addition to this $30 a week work, Bacon designed 10" album covers for Alfred Lion and Frank Wolff's label, Blue Note Records, and wrote reviews for The Record Changer, a magazine edited by Bill Grauer and Orrin Keepnews.

Bacon became the chief designer for Grauer and Keepnews's label, Riverside Records, in its early and middle years. At the same time he designed covers for the partner's reissues for the RCA Victor subsidiary label, "X". It was also during this time – the late 1940s and early 1950s – in which Bacon began to work in book design.

The cover of Compulsion.

In 1950, Bacon was asked by Bill Westley, a friend's father, to provide illustrations for his book, Chimp on My Shoulder. The art director for E. P. Dutton, the book's publisher, was pleased enough to ask Bacon to provide a dust jacket as well. The book was not anything major, but it gave Bacon his start.

In the early 1950s, Bacon was commissioned by Tom Bevans, the art director of Simon & Schuster, to design a number of titles. Commissions from other houses came in as well, and Bacon opened his own studio in 1955. He continued to have a series of studios with his name on the door for over 50 years.

His first big hit came in 1956 with Compulsion, a novel by Meyer Levin. This cover also marked the inception of the "Big Book Look" that Bacon became known for. This look features a large, bold title, a prominent author's name, and a small conceptual image. Instances of this "look" include Catch-22 by Joseph Heller, Visions of Cody by Jack Kerouac, and Bullet Park by John Cheever, along with countless others.

Throughout his career, Bacon was a member of the American Institute of Graphic Arts (AIGA), the Society of Illustrators, and the president of Graphic Artists for Self Preservation (G.A.S.P.), which was soon absorbed into the Graphic Artists Guild. He also taught at the School of Visual Arts for four years.

Bacon designed covers for about 50 years, from his start in the early 1950s to the early 2000s. Throughout his career he used hand-drawn letters and illustrations. In later years, while Bacon was officially retired from creating book jackets, he continued to work on special projects for the small publishing firm McPherson & Co., and he returned to designing jazz albums.

=== Design style ===
In jacket design, Bacon found a talent for "finding something that would be a synthesis graphically of what the story was about." He would work for about three weeks on a book – the first two reading and making a sketch, and the third to finalize the design once it was approved. He didn't draw thumbnails or multiple sketches, he simply provided one image of his idea. However, he was accommodating, and did multiple versions of jackets if the publisher was not pleased. Bacon completed as many as eleven versions of the cover for Catch-22 before a design was agreed upon.

Though Bacon had his signature style, he was by no means tied to it. His work was individualized, and he is noted to have "subordinated ego to function" in following what the book wanted. He did not, however, like to work directly with authors, so that the author would not influence the cover design.

"When you look at Bacon's jackets en masse, you realize that you're looking at a history of late-20th century commercial book cover design," said Stephen Heller in his article on Bacon for Print magazine in 2002.

== Musicianship ==
Bacon's passion for jazz did not leave off at listening, reviewing, and designing sleeves. He himself took up playing the comb in the late '40s at the urging of Bill Grauer. Bacon joined The Hot Club of Riverside Drive – Grauer (comb), Conrad Janis (trombone), Bob Greene (piano), Bob Thompson (washboard), Bob Sann (banjo), Bob Lee (jug), and Orrin Keepnews (comb) – in Friday night jams. Bacon also played with The Washboard Live and The Hot Damn Jug Band of New York, bands that performed in an around New York City. In 1976 he played at Carnegie Hall with Bob Greene's "World of Jelly Roll Morton" show.

Starting in 1980, Bacon performed on Tuesday nights for twenty-two years as a vocalist and on the comb with the New Orleans-style jazz band, "Stanly's Washboard Kings", at the Cajun, a New Orleans-style restaurant in New York City. He has performed in Japan, Australia, New England, and on many jazz cruises, booked by Hank O'Neil and Shelley Shier's agency, HOSS. He put out two albums, "Swing Me A Song" (1996) and "Things Are Looking Up" (2002), both from Jazzology.

== Works ==
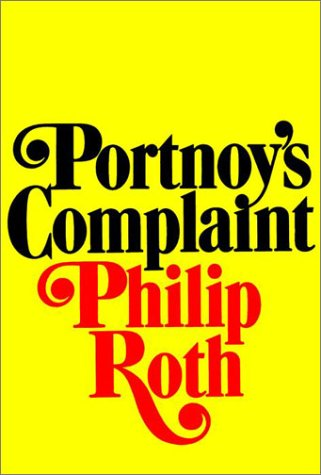
Bacon's design for the first printing of Portnoy's Complaint (1969), by Philip Roth, an example of his "Big Book Look" style.

=== Notable book jackets ===
- Compulsion by Meyer Levin, Simon & Schuster (1956)
- Catch-22 by Joseph Heller, Simon & Schuster (1961)
- One Flew Over the Cuckoo's Nest by Ken Kesey, Viking (1962, 1990)
- Miss MacIntosh, My Darling by Marguerite Young, Scribner's (1965)
- Jaws by Peter Benchley, Doubleday (1974)
- The Confessions of Nat Turner by William Styron, Random House (1966, 1967)
- Rosemary's Baby by Ira Levin, Random House (1967)
- Slaughterhouse-Five by Kurt Vonnegut, Jr., Dell Pub. Co. (1968)
- Portnoy's Complaint by Philip Roth, Random House (1969)
- Harvest Home by Thomas Tryon, Alfred A. Knopf (1973)
- Harlequin (novel) by Morris West, William Morrow & Company, Inc. (1974)
- Ragtime by E. L. Doctorow, Random House, Inc. (1974, 1975)
- Shōgun by James Clavell, Atheneum (1975)
- The Power Broker by Robert A. Caro, Alfred A. Knopf (1974)

=== Notable album covers ===
- Thelonious Monk: Genius of Modern Music: Blue Note (1947)
- The Amazing Bud Powell: Blue Note (1951)
- Fats Navarro: Memorial Album: Blue Note (1947)
- James Moody and His Modernists: Blue Note (1948)
- Milt Jackson: Wizard of the Vibes: Blue Note (1952)

=== Discography ===
- Swing Me A Song: Jazzology (1996)
- Things Are Looking Up: Jazzology (2002)

=== Essays ===
- "The High Priest of Be-bop." In The Thelonious Monk Reader, (New York: Oxford University Press, 2001), 56–62.
