= Street of Dreams (Grant Green album) =

Studio album by Grant Green
- Released: August 1967
- Recorded: November 16, 1964
- Studios: Van Gelder Studio, Englewood Cliffs, NJ
- Genre: Jazz
- Length: 33:34
- Labels: Blue Note; BST 84253
- Producer: Alfred Lion

Grant Green chronology
| Talkin' About! (1964) | Street of Dreams (1967) | I Want to Hold Your Hand (1965) |

Street of Dreams is an album by American jazz guitarist Grant Green featuring performances recorded in 1964 and released on the Blue Note label. The street signs featured on the cover photo are at an actual street corner in the North Beach neighborhood of San Francisco. Green is heard with organist Larry Young, vibraphonist Bobby Hutcherson and drummer Elvin Jones.

== Reception ==
The Allmusic review by Steve Huey awarded the album 3 stars calling it "a mellow, dreamy album that lives up to its title... It's another fine record in a discography filled with them, and yet another underrated Green session".

The All About Jazz review by Chris May said that "Compared to Idle Moments, which was distinguished by pianist Duke Pearson's thoughtful arrangements, Street of Dreams feels more like a blowing session—simple heads serve as jumping off points for solos, served out pretty evenhandedly, from Green, Hutcherson and Young. The choice of material, however, delivers an abundance of structural and harmonic interest... Bittersweet and beautiful, Street of Dreams will be enjoyed by anyone who loves Idle Moments". Green's material on the album includes two pieces not commonly recorded by jazz instrumentalists: Billy May's "Somewhere in the Night", which had been the theme of the popular U.S. television program Naked City from 1960–1962, and "Lazy Afternoon", a song from the 1954 musical The Golden Apple. The latter piece was further distinguished by its arrangement in 5/4 time.

The Penguin Guide to Jazz review by Richard Cook and Brian Morton stated: "Another exceptional record, though this time it is very much the group set-up that makes the difference. Though hooked into that easy overcooked guitar, organ, drums format, the personnel is such that one can reasonably expect a blend of power grooves and subtlety. Young is exceptional, very much on form, and Hutcherson makes an enormous contribution to a slower-paced and more meditative session than he'd normally favour".

Professional ratings
Review scores
| Source | Rating |
|---|---|
| Allmusic | 3/5 stars |
| DownBeat | 3/5 stars |
| The Penguin Guide to Jazz | 4/4 stars |

== Track listing ==
1. "I Wish You Love" (Que reste-t-il de nos amours?) (Léo Chauliac, Charles Trenet) – 8:46
2. "Lazy Afternoon" (John La Latouche, Jerome Moross) – 7:44
3. "Street of Dreams" (Victor Young, Sam M. Lewis) – 9:03
4. "Somewhere in the Night" (theme from Naked City) (Billy May, Milt Raskin) – 8:01

== Personnel ==
- Grant Green - guitar
- Bobby Hutcherson - vibes
- Larry Young - organ
- Elvin Jones - drums
