= Green Street (album) =

1961 studio album by Grant Green

Studio album by Grant Green
- Released: October 1961
- Recorded: April 1, 1961
- Studios: Van Gelder Studio, Englewood Cliffs, NJ
- Genres: Jazz, post-bop
- Length: 39:19
- Labels: Blue Note; BST 84071
- Producer: Alfred Lion

Grant Green chronology
Grant's First Stand (1961)	Green Street (1961)	Sunday Mornin' (1961)

Green Street is an album by American jazz guitarist Grant Green featuring performances recorded and released on the Blue Note label in 1961. Green is backed by bassist Ben Tucker and drummer Dave Bailey. The CD reissue in 1995 features two alternate takes from the same session as bonus tracks.

== Reception ==
Professional ratings
Review scores
Source	Rating
Allmusic	4/5 stars
Encyclopedia of Popular Music	4/5 stars
The Penguin Guide to Jazz Recordings	3/4 stars
DownBeat	4/5 stars

The Allmusic review by Michael G. Nastos awarded the album 4 stars and stated "Green Street stands as one of Grant Green's best recordings of many he produced in the ten prolific years he was with the Blue Note label".

== Track listing ==
All compositions by Grant Green except as indicated

1. "No. 1 Green Street" – 7:20
2. "'Round About Midnight" (Thelonious Monk) – 7:04
3. "Grant's Dimensions" – 7:56
4. "Green with Envy" – 9:46
5. "Alone Together" (Howard Dietz, Arthur Schwartz) – 7:13

Bonus tracks on CD reissue:

6. "Green with Envy" [Alternate take] – 7:55
7. "Alone Together" [Alternate take] – 6:56

== Personnel ==
- Grant Green – guitar
- Ben Tucker – bass
- Dave Bailey – drums
