= Shoutin' =

Studio album by Don Wilkerson
- Released: 1963
- Recorded: July 29, 1963; Van Gelder Studio, Englewood Cliffs
- Genre: Jazz
- Length: 36:52
- Label: Blue Note; BST 84145
- Producer: Alfred Lion

Don Wilkerson chronology
Preach Brother! (1962)	Shoutin' (1963)

Shoutin' is an album by American saxophonist Don Wilkerson recorded in 1963 and released on the Blue Note label.

== Reception ==
The Allmusic review by Stephen Thomas Erlewine awarded the album 4 stars and stated "the high quality of the music on this album, as well as Wilkerson's other three records, will make most soul-jazz fans regret that this was his last record. It will also make them treasure the albums all the more."

Professional ratings
Review scores
Source	Rating
Allmusic	4/5 stars

== Track listing ==
All compositions by Don Wilkerson except as indicated

1. "Movin' Out" - 5:27
2. "Cookin' With Clarence" - 7:30
3. "Easy Living" (Ralph Rainger, Leo Robin) - 6:08
4. "Happy Johnny" - 5:35
5. "Blues for J" - 6:11
6. "Sweet Cake" (Edward Frank) - 6:01

== Personnel ==
- Don Wilkerson - tenor saxophone
- John Patton - organ
- Grant Green - guitar
- Ben Dixon - drums
