= Matador (Grant Green album) =

Studio album by Grant Green
- Released: 1979
- Recorded: May 20, 1964
- Studios: Van Gelder Studio, Englewood Cliffs, NJ
- Genres: Modal jazz, post-bop
- Length: 42:05 Original LP; 51:06 CD reissue
- Labels: Blue Note; GXF-3053
- Producer: Alfred Lion

Grant Green chronology
Idle Moments (1963)	Matador (1979)	Solid (1964)

Alternative cover
- 2010 Music Matters vinyl pressing

Matador is an album by American jazz guitarist Grant Green. It contains performances recorded in 1964 but not released on the Japanese Blue Note label until 1979. It features Green with pianist McCoy Tyner and drummer Elvin Jones (both from John Coltrane’s group), and bassist Bob Cranshaw. The album was finally reissued in the U.S. on CD in 1990 with one bonus track. It was also reissued on vinyl in 2010, with a different cover.

== Reception ==
Professional ratings
Review scores
Source	Rating
AllMusic	5/5 stars
The Encyclopedia of Popular Music	4/5 stars
The Penguin Guide to Jazz Recordings	3/4 stars

The AllMusic review by Steve Huey stated: "it's a classic and easily one of Green's finest albums. In contrast to the soul-jazz and jazz-funk for which Green is chiefly remembered, Matador is a cool-toned, straight-ahead modal workout that features some of Green's most advanced improvisation... The group interplay is consistently strong, but really the spotlight falls chiefly on Green, whose crystal-clear articulation flourishes in this setting. And, for all of Matador's advanced musicality, it ends up being surprisingly accessible. This sound may not be Green's claim to fame, but Matador remains one of his greatest achievements".

== Track listing ==
1. "Matador" (Green) – 10:51
2. "My Favorite Things" (Oscar Hammerstein II, Richard Rodgers) – 10:23
3. "Green Jeans" (Green) – 9:10
4. "Bedouin" (Duke Pearson) – 11:41
5. "Wives and Lovers" (Burt Bacharach, Hal David) – 9:01 Bonus track on CD reissue

Recorded on May 20 (tracks 1–4) & June 12 (track 5), 1964.

== Personnel ==
- Grant Green - guitar
- McCoy Tyner - piano
- Bob Cranshaw - bass
- Elvin Jones - drums
