= Behind the 8 Ball =

Studio album by Baby Face Willette
- Released: 1965
- Recorded: November 30, 1964; Ter Mar Recording Studio, Chicago, Illinois
- Genre: Jazz
- Length: 32:34
- Label: Argo; LP-749
- Producer: Esmond Edwards

Baby Face Willette chronology
Mo' Rock (1964)	Behind the 8 Ball (1965)

Behind the 8 Ball is an album by organist Baby Face Willette recorded in 1964 and released on the Argo label.

== Reception ==
Professional ratings
Review scores
Source	Rating
Allmusic	3/5 stars

Allmusic awarded the album 3 stars stating "Again, it's not quite as good as his Blue Notes (with their stellar supporting casts), but for a look at Willette's roots, Behind the 8-Ball is a solid acquisition, and worth tracking down for devotees". Douglas Payne reviewed the rerelease for All About Jazz stating "Behind the 8 Ball smokes some of the hottest, grooviest organ jazz imaginable - and catches Willette at his very best. This stuff hits heavier than any of the well-rehearsed music Willette recorded for Blue Note".

== Track listing ==
All compositions by Roosevelt "Baby Face" Willette except as indicated

1. "Behind the 8 Ball" - 2:22
2. "Song of the Universe" - 7:08
3. "Amen" (Traditional) - 2:34
4. "Tacos Joe" - 3:14
5. "Roll 'Em Pete" (Pete Johnson, Big Joe Turner) - 3:30
6. "Just a Closer Walk with Thee" (Traditional) - 7:00
7. "St. James Infirmary" (Traditional) - 2:24
8. "Sinnin' Sam" (Stix Hooper) - 4:25

== Personnel ==
- Baby Face Willette - organ
- Ben White - guitar
- Jerold Donavon - drums
