= The Other Side of Abbey Road =

Studio album by George Benson
- Released: June 1970
- Recorded: October 22–23 & November 4–5, 1969
- Studio: Van Gelder Studio, Englewood Cliffs
- Genre: Jazz
- Length: 31:36
- Label: A&M; SP 3028
- Producer: Creed Taylor

George Benson chronology
Tell It Like It Is (1969)	The Other Side of Abbey Road (1970)	Beyond the Blue Horizon (1971)

Professional ratings
Review scores
Source	Rating
AllMusic	4.5/5 stars
The Rolling Stone Jazz Record Guide	3/5 stars

The Other Side of Abbey Road is a 1970 studio album by American guitarist George Benson of songs from the Beatles' 1969 album Abbey Road. It was his last album for A&M Records. The front cover is a photograph of Benson by Eric Meola in E 53rd Street, Midtown East, New York City.

Online music service Rhapsody praised the album, calling it "winning", a "delightful release", and citing it as one of their 20 favorite cover albums.

== Track listing ==
All songs written by Lennon–McCartney, except "Something" and "Here Comes the Sun" by George Harrison, and "Octopus's Garden" by Ringo Starr.

No.	Title	Length
1.	"Golden Slumbers / You Never Give Me Your Money"	4:47
2.	"Because / Come Together"	7:26
3.	"Oh! Darling"	4:01
4.	"Here Comes the Sun / I Want You (She's So Heavy)"	9:00
5.	"Something / Octopus's Garden / The End"	6:22
Total length:		31:36

== Personnel ==
- George Benson – guitar, vocals
- Bob James – acoustic piano, organ, harpsichord
- Herbie Hancock – acoustic piano, organ, harpsichord
- Ernie Hayes – acoustic piano, organ, harpsichord
- Ron Carter, Jerry Jemmott – Bass guitar
- Idris Muhammad, Ed Shaughnessy – drums
- Ray Barretto, Andy Gonzalez – percussion
- Phil Bodner – flute, oboe
- Hubert Laws – flute
- Don Ashworth – baritone saxophone
- Sonny Fortune – alto saxophone
- Jerome Richardson – tenor saxophone, clarinet, flute
- Wayne Andre – trombone, euphonium
- Freddie Hubbard – trumpet
- Mel Davis, Bernie Glow, Marvin Stamm – trumpet, flugelhorn
- Don Sebesky – arrangements

=== Strings ===
- George Ricci – cello
- Emanuel Vardi – viola
- Raoul Poliakin, Max Pollikoff – violin

=== Technical ===
- Creed Taylor – producer
- Rudy Van Gelder – engineer
- Sam Antupit – album design
- Eric Meola – photography

== See also ==
- McLemore Avenue
