= The Latin Bit =

Studio album by Grant Green
- Released: May 1963
- Recorded: April 26 & September 7, 1962
- Studio: Van Gelder Studio, Englewood Cliffs, NJ
- Genre: Latin jazz
- Length: 38:56 original LP; 59:53 CD reissue
- Label: Blue Note; BST 84111
- Producer: Alfred Lion

Grant Green chronology
| Born to Be Blue (1962) | The Latin Bit (1963) | Goin' West (1962) |

The Latin Bit is an album by American jazz guitarist Grant Green featuring performances recorded in 1962 and released on the Blue Note label. It is a loose concept album inspired by Latin American music. It features tenor saxophonist Ike Quebec, pianists Sonny Clark and John Adriano Acea, bassist Wendell Marshall and percussionists Willie Bobo, Garvin Masseaux and “Patato” Valdes.

== Reception ==
Professional ratings
Review scores
| Source | Rating |
|---|---|
| Allmusic | 3.5/5 stars |
| The Penguin Guide to Jazz Recordings | 3/4 stars |

The Allmusic review by Michael G. Nastos awarded the album 3½ stars and stated "This CD always yielded mixed results for staunch fans of Green, but a revisit shows it to be a credible effort, even if slightly flawed in part".

== Track listing ==
All compositions by Grant Green except where noted

1. "Mambo Inn" (Mario Bauzá, Edgar Sampson, Bobby Woodlen) – 5:52
2. "Bésame Mucho" (Consuelo Velázquez) – 7:12
3. "Mama Inez" (L. Wolfe Gilbert, Eliseo Grenet) – 6:42
4. "Brazil" (Ary Barroso) – 5:01
5. "Tico Tico" (Zequinha de Abreu) – 7:46
6. "My Little Suede Shoes" (Charlie Parker) – 6:23

Bonus track on CD reissue:

7. "Blues for Juanita" – 7:06
8. "Granada" (Agustín Lara) – 6:27
9. "Hey There" (Richard Adler, Jerry Ross) – 7:24

Recorded on April 26 (tracks 1–7) and September 7 (tracks 8–9), 1962.

== Personnel ==
- Grant Green – guitar
- Ike Quebec – tenor saxophone (tracks 8–9)
- John Adriano Acea (tracks 1–7), Sonny Clark (tracks 8–9) – piano
- Wendell Marshall – bass
- Willie Bobo – drums
- Carlos "Patato" Valdes – conga (tracks 1–6, 8–9)
- Garvin Masseaux – chekere (tracks 1–6)

== Charts ==
Chart performance for The Latin Bit
| Chart (2022) | Peak position |
|---|---|
| Belgian Albums (Ultratop Wallonia) | 186 |
| German Albums (Offizielle Top 100) | 54 |
