= Carryin' On =

Studio album by Grant Green
- Released: Spring 1970
- Recorded: October 3, 1969
- Studio: Van Gelder Studio, Englewood Cliffs, NJ
- Genre: Jazz-funk
- Length: 37:49
- Label: Blue Note; BST 84327
- Producer: Francis Wolff

Grant Green chronology
Iron City (1967)	Carryin' On (1970)	Green Is Beautiful (1970)

Carryin' On is an album by American jazz guitarist Grant Green featuring performances recorded in 1969 and released on the Blue Note label. The album marked Green's return to the Blue Note label and embracing a jazz-funk style that he would play for the rest of his life.

== Reception ==
Professional ratings
Review scores
Source	Rating
Allmusic	3/5 stars
The Penguin Guide to Jazz Recordings	2/4 stars

The Allmusic review by Steve Huey awarded the album 3 stars and stated "While it won't win over fans of Green's older work, Carryin' On is a solid addition to any acid-jazz/funk/rare-groove library, as are most of Green's albums from this period".

== Track listing ==
1. "Ease Back" (Ziggy Modeliste, Art Neville, Leo Nocentelli, George Porter Jr.) – 5:49
2. "Hurt So Bad" (Bobby Hart, Teddy Randazzo, Bobby Wilding) – 6:51
3. "I Don't Want Nobody to Give Me Nothing (Open Up the Door I'll Get It Myself)" (James Brown) – 6:14
4. "Upshot" (Grant Green) – 10:04
5. "Cease the Bombing" (Neal Creque) – 8:51

== Personnel ==
- Grant Green – guitar
- Claude Bartee – tenor saxophone
- Willie Bivens – vibes
- Earl Neal Creque (track 5), Clarence Palmer (tracks 1–4) – electric piano
- Jimmy Lewis – Fender electric bass
- Idris Muhammad – drums

Technical

- Rudy Van Gelder – recording
- Frank Gauna – art direction
- Bob Venosa, Havona – cover design
