= Live at Club Mozambique (Grant Green album) =

Live album by Grant Green
- Released: July 18, 2006
- Recorded: January 6–7, 1971
- Venue: Club Mozambique, Detroit, Michigan
- Genre: Jazz
- Label: Blue Note
- Producer: Francis Wolff, Bob Belden

Grant Green chronology
Alive! (1970)	Live at Club Mozambique (2006)	Visions (1971)

Live at Club Mozambique is a live album by American jazz guitarist Grant Green featuring performances recorded at the Club Mozambique in Detroit on January 6 and 7, 1971, but not released on the Blue Note label until 2006.

== Reception ==
The Allmusic review by Thom Jurek awarded the album 3½ stars and stated "The horn charts are tight and elaborate in their fashion, and Green pulls out the stops layering blues, jazz, and soulful funkiness into each of his lines. And to hear this rhythm section simmer and pop is glorious. Highly recommended".

The All About Jazz review by Chris May stated "Green plays immaculately, if not adventurously, throughout. His tone is clean, his phrasing is masterful, and his lines cook. He could do this stuff in his sleep—but he didn't. He plays like he means it, and from time to time he touches the spirit. So long as you're not expecting the intricate rhapsodies of his 1963 magnum opus, Idle Moments, you'll enjoy the ride". Another review by Norman Weinstein stated "This recording is evidence that at the end of his life, he did find his truest musical identity. He was a fierce funk improviser, and no studio session caught the fire—but this live session does".

Professional ratings
Review scores
Source	Rating
Allmusic	3.5/5 stars
The Penguin Guide to Jazz Recordings	3.5/4 stars

== Track listing ==
1. "Jan Jan" (Mose Davis) - 9:30
2. "Farid" (Clarence Thomas) - 11:41
3. "Bottom of the Barrel" (Grant Green) - 9:39
4. "Walk On By" (Burt Bacharach, Hal David) - 7:09
5. "More Today Than Yesterday" (Pat Upton) - 12:22
6. "One More Chance" (The Corporation) - 6:07
7. "Patches" (General Norman Johnson, Ronald Dunbar) - 9:28
8. "I Am Somebody" (Arthur Snyder) - 9:09

- Recorded at the Club Mozambique in Detroit, Michigan on January 6 & 7, 1971

== Personnel ==
- Grant Green - guitar
- Clarence Thomas - soprano saxophone, tenor saxophone
- Houston Person - tenor saxophone
- Ronnie Foster - organ
- Idris Muhammad - drums
