= The Texas Twister =

Studio album by Don Wilkerson
- Released: 1960
- Recorded: May 19 & 20, 1960
- Genre: Jazz
- Length: 41:06
- Label: Riverside
- Producer: Cannonball Adderley

Don Wilkerson chronology
The Texas Twister (1960)	Elder Don (1962)

The Texas Twister is the debut album by American saxophonist Don Wilkerson recorded in 1960 and released on the Riverside label.

== Reception ==
Professional ratings
Review scores
Source	Rating
Allmusic	3/5 stars
The Penguin Guide to Jazz Recordings	3/4 stars

The Allmusic review by Alex Henderson awarded the album 3 stars and stated "The Texas Twister is recommended to anyone who admires the Lone Star school of soulful, hard-blowing tenor".

== Track listing ==
All compositions by Don Wilkerson except as indicated

1. "The Twister" (Cannonball Adderley) - 6:32
2. "Morning Coffee" (Barry Harris) - 7:52
3. "Idiom" (Jim Martin) - 5:21
4. "Jelly Roll" - 7:44
5. "Easy to Love" (Cole Porter) - 4:38
6. "Where or When" (Lorenz Hart, Richard Rodgers) - 4:02
7. "Media" (Martin) - 4:57

- Recorded in San Francisco, California on May 19 (tracks 2, 3 & 7) and May 20 (tracks 1 & 4–6), 1960.

== Personnel ==
- Don Wilkerson - tenor saxophone
- Nat Adderley - cornet (tracks 1–4 & 7)
- Barry Harris - piano
- Sam Jones - bass (tracks 1, 4–6)
- Leroy Vinnegar - bass (tracks 2, 3, 7)
- Billy Higgins - drums
