= Solid (Grant Green album) =

Studio album by Grant Green
- Released: 1979
- Recorded: June 12, 1964
- Studios: Van Gelder Studio, Englewood Cliffs, NJ
- Genre: Jazz
- Length: 47:33 CD reissue
- Labels: Blue Note; LT 990
- Producer: Alfred Lion

Grant Green chronology
Matador (1964)	Solid (1979)	Talkin' About! (1964)

Alternative cover
- 1995 CD edition

Alternative cover
- Japanese vinyl (GXK 8187, 1980)

Solid is an album by American jazz guitarist Grant Green, containing performances recorded in 1964 but not released on the Blue Note label until 1979. McCoy Tyner, Elvin Jones and Bob Cranshaw from Green's previous session are joined by alto saxophonist James Spaulding and tenor saxophonist Joe Henderson.

== Reception ==
Professional ratings
Review scores
Source	Rating
AllMusic	4.5/5 stars
The Encyclopedia of Popular Music	4/5 stars
The Penguin Guide to Jazz Recordings	3/4 stars
The Rolling Stone Jazz Record Guide	5/5 stars
DownBeat	4/5 stars

The AllMusic review by Steve Huey stated: "Solid is a bright, hard-charging affair. There's a little modal jazz, but Solid's repertoire is chiefly complex hard bop, full of challenging twists and turns that the players burn through with enthusiasm. Green didn't tackle this kind of material — or play with this kind of group — very often, and it's a treat to hear him do so on both counts... one of Green's strongest jazz outings and a unique standout in his catalog".

== Track listing ==
1. "Minor League" (Duke Pearson) – 7:05
2. "Ezz-Thetic" (George Russell) – 10:41
3. "Grant's Tune" (Grant Green) – 7:01
4. "Solid" (Sonny Rollins) – 7:23
5. "The Kicker" (Joe Henderson) – 6:23
6. "Wives and Lovers"(*) (Burt Bacharach, Hal David) – 9:00

(*)Bonus track on CD reissue, from Matador

== Personnel ==
- Grant Green - guitar
- McCoy Tyner - piano
- Bob Cranshaw - bass
- Elvin Jones - drums
- James Spaulding - alto saxophone (tracks 1–5)
- Joe Henderson - tenor saxophone (1–5)
