= Grant's First Stand =

Studio album by Grant Green
- Released: May 1961
- Recorded: January 28, 1961
- Studio: Van Gelder Studio, Englewood Cliffs
- Genre: Soul jazz
- Length: 40:01
- Label: Blue Note; BST 84064
- Producer: Alfred Lion

Grant Green chronology
First Session (1960-61)	Grant's First Stand (1961)	Green Street (1961)

Grant's First Stand is the debut album by American jazz guitarist Grant Green featuring performances by Green recorded and released on the Blue Note label in 1961. He is featured in a trio with organist Baby Face Willette and drummer Ben Dixon. Earlier recordings made by Green for Blue Note were released as First Session in 2001. Although it was his first album released as a leader on Blue Note, Grant Green had recorded earlier sessions for the label in 1960 that were not issued until decades later. Green was recommended to Blue Note by saxophonist Lou Donaldson, who encouraged him to move to New York after hearing him perform in East St. Louis.

== Reception ==
Professional ratings
Review scores
Source	Rating
Allmusic	4.5/5 stars
Encyclopedia of Popular Music	3/5 stars
The Penguin Guide to Jazz Recordings	3/4 stars

The Allmusic review by Steve Huey awarded the album 4½ stars and stated: "Grant's First Stand still ranks as one of his greatest pure soul-jazz outings, a set of killer grooves laid down by a hard-swinging organ trio."

== Track listing ==
All compositions by Grant Green except as indicated

1. "Miss Ann's Tempo" – 5:38
2. "Lullaby of the Leaves" (Bernice Petkere, Joe Young) – 7:41
3. "Blues for Willarene" – 7:08
4. "Baby's Minor Lope" (Baby Face Willette) – 7:19
5. "'Tain't Nobody's Bizness If I Do" (Porter Grainger) – 4:26
6. "A Wee Bit O'Green" – 7:49

== Personnel ==
- Grant Green – guitar
- Baby Face Willette – organ
- Ben Dixon – drums
