= Stop and Listen =

Studio album by Baby Face Willette
- Released: 1961
- Recorded: May 22, 1961; Van Gelder Studio, Englewood Cliffs
- Genre: Jazz
- Length: 49:32
- Label: Blue Note; BST 84084
- Producer: Alfred Lion

Baby Face Willette chronology
Face to Face (1961)	Stop and Listen (1961)	Mo' Rock (1964)

Stop and Listen is the second album by American jazz organist Baby Face Willette featuring performances recorded and released on the Blue Note label in 1961. It features a version of the 1941 Harry Warren song "At Last," which at the time of the Stop and Listen recording sessions was on the R&B and Billboard Hot 100 record charts through Etta James' hit recording of the song.

== Reception ==
Professional ratings
Review scores
Source	Rating
Allmusic	4.5/5 stars

The Allmusic review by Steve Huey awarded the album 4½ stars and stated "With Blue Note's extraordinary stable of talent, it's a shame that Willette never led another session for the label, which makes Stop and Listen that much more essential for soul-jazz fans".

== Track listing ==
All compositions by Baby Face Willette except as indicated

1. "Willow Weep for Me" (Ann Ronell) - 8:14
2. "Chances Are Few" - 7:41
3. "Jumpin' Jupiter" - 5:11
4. "Stop and Listen" - 4:38
5. "At Last" (Mack Gordon, Harry Warren) - 7:19
6. "Soul Walk" - 5:23
7. "Work Song" (Nat Adderley) - 4:53
8. "They Can't Take That Away from Me" (George Gershwin, Ira Gershwin) - 6:24 Bonus track on CD reissue

== Personnel ==
- Baby Face Willette – organ
- Grant Green – guitar
- Ben Dixon – drums
