= First Session =

Studio album by Grant Green
- Released: 2001
- Recorded: November 16, 1960 & October 27, 1961
- Studio: Van Gelder Studio, Englewood Cliffs, NJ
- Genre: Jazz
- Length: 50:37
- Label: Blue Note
- Producer: Alfred Lion

Grant Green chronology
First Session (2001)	Grant's First Stand (1961)

First Session is an album by American jazz guitarist Grant Green featuring performances recorded in 1960 and 1961 but not released on the Blue Note label until 2001. The album features the first recordings made by Green for Blue Note which were held back from release in favour of a later recording date which appeared as Grant's First Stand (1961). Green is supported by pianist Wynton Kelly, bassist Paul Chambers and drummer ”Philly” Joe Jones. Also included on the album are two takes from a later 1961 session that feature pianist Sonny Clark, bassist Butch Warren and drummer Billy Higgins.

== Reception ==
Professional ratings
Review scores
Source	Rating
Allmusic	4/5 stars

The AllMusic review by Ronnie D. Lankford Jr. awarded the album 4 stars and stated: "Whatever hesitation Green may have felt as a first time leader, the warmth and immediacy of his style arrives in full bloom. First Session is a lively portrait of a jazz great, surrounded by the best musicians in the business, getting his feet wet. Don't miss it."

== Track listing ==
All compositions by Grant Green except where noted.

1. "He's a Real Gone Guy" (Nellie Lutcher) - 5:19
2. "Seepin'" - 11:46
3. "Just Friends" (John Klenner, Sam M. Lewis) - 6:36
4. "Grant's First Stand" - 8:50
5. "Sonnymoon for Two" (Sonny Rollins) - 6:16
6. "Woody 'N You" [Take 4] (Dizzy Gillespie) - 5:55
7. "Woody 'N You" [Take 7] (Gillespie) - 5:55
- Recorded at Rudy Van Gelder Studio, Englewood Cliffs, NJ on November 26, 1960 (tracks 1–5) & October 27, 1961 (tracks 6 & 7).

== Personnel ==
- Grant Green - guitar

Tracks 1–5

- Wynton Kelly - piano
- Paul Chambers - bass
- Philly Joe Jones - drums

Tracks 6–7

- Sonny Clark - piano
- Butch Warren - bass
- Billy Higgins - drums
