= Don Wilkerson =

American saxophonist (c. 1932–1986)

Don Wilkerson (c. 1932 – 18 July 1986) was an American soul jazz / R&B tenor saxophonist born in Moreauville, Louisiana. He was raised in Houston, and it remained his base until he died there in 1986.

He is probably best known for his Blue Note Records recordings in the 1960s as bandleader with guitarist Grant Green. Prior to signing with the label, he worked frequently with Cannonball Adderley. Some of his earliest recordings were done in the 1950s as a sideman for Amos Milburn and Ray Charles. He can be heard on several of Charles's hits from the 1950s, including "I Got a Woman," "This Little Girl of Mine," and "Hallelujah, I Love Her So."

Remaining in Houston from the early 1970s, he played in the Sonny Franklin Big Band with Tom Archia, Arnett Cobb, and his bandmate from the Ray Charles band, Joe Bridgewater, with guest appearances by Eddie "Cleanhead" Vinson and Clarence "Gatemouth" Brown. Many of the band's arrangements were done by Cedric Haywood.

Wilkerson's work is featured in the 2001 Blue Note Records series,The Complete Blue Note Sessions.

== Discography ==
=== As leader ===
- The Texas Twister (Riverside, 1960)
- Preach Brother! (Blue Note, 1962)
- Shoutin' (Blue Note, 1963)
- Elder Don (Blue Note, 1963)

=== As sideman ===
With Ray Charles

- Yes Indeed! (Atlantic, 1958)
- Modern Sounds in Country and Western Music (ABC-Paramount, 1962)
- Jazz at the Philharmonic: Ray Charles - Berlin 1962 (Pablo, 1996)

With others

- B.B. King, Blues 'N' Jazz (MCA, 1983)
- Amos Milburn, Chicken Shack Boogie (United Artists, 1978)
