= That's Where It's At =

Studio album by Stanley Turrentine
- Released: September 1962
- Recorded: January 2, 1962
- Studio: Van Gelder Studio, Englewood Cliffs
- Genre: Soul jazz, hard bop
- Length: 41:28
- Label: Blue Note; BST 84096
- Producer: Alfred Lion

Stanley Turrentine chronology
ZT's Blues (1961)	That's Where It's At (1962)	Jubilee Shout!!! (1962)

Professional ratings
Review scores
Source	Rating
Down Beat (Original Lp release)	3/5 stars
The Penguin Guide to Jazz Recordings	3/4 stars

That's Where It's At is a 1962 jazz album by saxophonist Stanley Turrentine, recorded by Rudy Van Gelder for Blue Note Records, and featuring pianist Les McCann. Turrentine had appeared a week earlier with McCann's group, recording the live date that would be released as Les McCann Ltd. in New York.

== Track listing ==
1. "Smile, Stacey" (Les McCann) – 8:09
2. "Soft Pedal Blues" (Stanley Turrentine) – 7:29
3. "Pia" (McCann) – 5:38
4. "We'll See Yaw'll After While, Ya Heah" (McCann) – 7:24
5. "Dorene Don't Cry, I" (McCann) – 6:16
6. "Light Blue" (Tommy Turrentine) – 6:32
7. "Light Blue" [Alternate Take] – 6:26 Bonus track on CD reissue

== Personnel ==
- Stanley Turrentine – tenor saxophone
- Les McCann – piano
- Herbie Lewis – bass
- Otis Finch – drums

== Design Personnel ==
- Reid Miles – Cover Design
- Francis Wolff – Cover Photo
