= Talkin' About! =

Studio album by Grant Green
- Released: September 1965
- Recorded: September 11, 1964
- Studio: Van Gelder Studio, Englewood Cliffs, NJ
- Genre: Jazz
- Length: 41:05
- Label: Blue Note; BST 84183
- Producer: Alfred Lion

Grant Green chronology
Solid (1964)	Talkin' About! (1965)	Street of Dreams (1964)

Talkin' About! is an American jazz guitarist Grant Green album featuring performances recorded in 1964 and released on the Blue Note label. Green is supported by organist Larry Young and drummer Elvin Jones. It was reissued in Japan on CD with a slightly different cover: same design, but with a blue background.

== Reception ==
Professional ratings
Review scores
Source	Rating
Allmusic	4.5/5 stars
Encyclopedia of Popular Music	4/5 stars
The Penguin Guide to Jazz Recordings	3.5/4 stars
Down Beat	3.5/5 stars

The Allmusic review by Steve Huey awarded the album 4½ stars. It stated, "With just a basic organ trio lineup, the album works a fascinating middle ground between the soul-jazz of Green's early days and the modal flavor of his most recent work... It all makes for a terrific album that ranks in Green's uppermost echelon".

== Track listing ==
1. "Talkin' About J.C." (Larry Young) – 11:45
2. "People" (Bob Merrill, Jule Styne) – 7:28
3. "Luny Tune" (Larry Young) – 7:43
4. "You Don't Know What Love Is" (Gene de Paul, Don Raye) – 7:38
5. "I'm an Old Cowhand (From the Rio Grande)" (Johnny Mercer) – 6:31

== Personnel ==
- Grant Green - guitar
- Larry Young - organ
- Elvin Jones - drums
