= ZT's Blues =

Studio album by Stanley Turrentine
- Released: 1985
- Recorded: September 13, 1961
- Studio: Van Gelder Studio, Englewood Cliffs, NJ
- Genre: Jazz
- Length: 40:13
- Label: Blue Note; BST 84424
- Producer: Alfred Lion

Stanley Turrentine chronology
Dearly Beloved (1961)	ZT's Blues (1985)	That's Where It's At (1962)

Professional ratings
Review scores
Source	Rating
Allmusic	4.5/5 stars

ZT's Blues is the fifth album by jazz saxophonist Stanley Turrentine recorded for the Blue Note label in 1961 but not released until 1985 and performed by Turrentine with Tommy Flanagan, Grant Green, Paul Chambers, and Art Taylor.

== Reception ==
The Allmusic review by Michael Erlewine awarded the album 4½ stars stating "Green and Turrentine made few albums together, but the combination is a natural — the two greatest groove masters, bar none... If you can find a copy of this, it is a keeper".

== Track listing ==
1. "Z.T.'s Blues" (Turrentine) – 6:43
2. "More Than You Know" (Edward Eliscu, Rose, Youmans) – 6:08
3. "The Lamp Is Low" (DeRose, Parish, Ravel, Shefter) – 6:07
4. "The Way You Look Tonight" (Fields, Kern) – 5:44
5. "For Heaven's Sake" (Elise Bretton, Sherman Edwards, Donald Meyer) – 4:44
6. "I Wish I Knew" (Gordon, Warren) – 5:34
7. "Be My Love" (Brodszky, Cahn) – 5:13

== Personnel ==
- Stanley Turrentine – tenor saxophone
- Tommy Flanagan – piano
- Grant Green – guitar
- Paul Chambers – bass
- Art Taylor – drums
