= Beyond the Blue Horizon (album) =

Studio album by George Benson
- Released: May 1971
- Recorded: February 2–3, 1971
- Studio: Van Gelder Studio, Englewood Cliffs
- Genre: Jazz
- Length: 34:04
- Label: CTI
- Producer: Creed Taylor (LP 1971); Didier C. Deutsch (CD 1987)

George Benson chronology
| The Other Side of Abbey Road (1970) | Beyond the Blue Horizon (1971) | White Rabbit (1972) |

Beyond the Blue Horizon is a 1971 studio album by American jazz guitarist George Benson. It was his first album released by CTI and included organist Clarence Palmer, drummer Jack DeJohnette, bassist Ron Carter, and percussionists Michael Cameron and Albert Nicholson.

== Background ==
Beyond the Blue Horizon was the first Benson album released by CTI Records after the label became independent and was no longer a subsidiary of A&M. In an interview by Anthony Brown and Ken Kimery in April 2011, Benson said CTI label head Creed Taylor had to borrow money to make the record, and elaborated that "he didn't have no money to put any sweetening on it, no strings or anything like that....I thought, I'll just get some great cats, pick some great tunes, and play some great guitar....I borrowed Miles Davis's drummer Jack DeJohnette and brought Ron Carter aboard, so I thought it would be appropriate to honor Miles with a funky cover of 'So What', his classic modal tune from Kind of Blue. We also experimented with some Middle Eastern vibes, some bossa nova, and some good old bebop."

The studio band on the album was a slightly enlarged version of the organ trio jazz groups that Benson had played in during the 1960s with organist Jack McDuff and others. The instrumentation was a contrast to his then-recent A&M albums like The Other Side of Abbey Road (1970) and Shape of Things to Come (1969), which featured larger jazz ensembles arranged by Don Sebesky. On Beyond the Blue Horizon, the addition of acoustic bass and two percussion players to the traditional organ trio instruments (organ, guitar, and drums) made the studio group a sextet. Benson returned to the production style of his A&M albums on his next CTI album, White Rabbit (1972), which was arranged once again by Don Sebesky. Not until 1990's Big Boss Band did Benson record another studio album that was focused on the jazz traditions of swing and bebop.

== Artwork ==
The cover of the LP from 1971 was designed by Bob Ciano with photos by Pete Turner. "Flames" was shot in 1964 in Libya as part of a series Turner made for Standard Oil. The picture of Benson in black and white was taken by Chuck Stewart.

== Composition ==
The performance of Miles Davis's "So What" is driven by the rhythm section of bassist Ron Carter and drummer Jack DeJohnette, who provide strong support for solos by Benson and organist Clarence Palmer, according to Dan Bilawsky in All About Jazz as "constantly shifts from funk to up-tempo swing to a half-time feel".

== Critical reception ==
Professional ratings
Review scores
| Source | Rating |
|---|---|
| Allmusic | 5/5 stars |
| Penguin Guide to Jazz on CD | 3/4 stars |
| The Rolling Stone Jazz Record Guide | 3/5 stars |

In the 7th edition of the Penguin Guide to Jazz on CD, critics Richard Cook and Brian Morton wrote Beyond the Blue Horizon "still has the right to be one of Benson's best records". At AllMusic Richard S. Ginell stated "this is a superb jazz session". "The Jazz Messenger" called it "probably the single best document of Benson's technically fluid facility and his musically inventive lyricism at any tempo."

== Track listing ==
All tracks are written by George Benson except where noted.

| No. | Title | Writer(s) | Length |
|---|---|---|---|
| 1. | "So What" | Miles Davis | 9:21 |
| 2. | "The Gentle Rain" | Luiz Bonfá, Matt Dubey | 9:15 |
| 3. | "All Clear" | | 5:29 |
| 4. | "Ode to a Kudu" | | 3:48 |
| 5. | "Somewhere in the East" | | 6:11 |
| Total length: | | | 34:04 |

Bonus tracks on CD reissue in 1997 and 2011:
| No. | Title | Length |
|---|---|---|
| 6. | "All Clear" (alternate take) | 5:45 |
| 7. | "Ode to a Kudu" (alternate take) | 4:39 |
| 8. | "Somewhere in the East" (alternate take) | 9:46 |

== Personnel ==
- George Benson – guitar
- Clarence Palmer – Hammond organ
- Ron Carter – double bass, electric cello
- Jack DeJohnette – drums
- Michael Cameron – percussion
- Albert Nicholson – percussion

Technical

- Rudy Van Gelder – engineering
- Bob Ciano – album design
- Chuck Stewart – photography
- Pete Turner – photography
