= The Final Comedown (soundtrack) =

Soundtrack album by Grant Green
- Released: 1972
- Recorded: December 13–14, 1971
- Genre: Jazz
- Label: Blue Note
- Producer: George Butler

Grant Green chronology
Shades of Green (1971)	The Final Comedown (1972)	Live at The Lighthouse (1972)

The Final Comedown is a soundtrack album for the film The Final Comedown (1972) by American jazz guitarist Grant Green featuring performances recorded in 1971 and released on the Blue Note label. It was the first soundtrack album released on Blue Note.

== Reception ==
Professional ratings
Review scores
Source	Rating
Allmusic	3/5 stars
The Penguin Guide to Jazz Recordings	2/4 stars

The Allmusic review by Brandon Burke awarded the album 3 stars and stated "Recommended for fans of blaxploitation soundtracks and early-'70s jazz-funk".

== Track listing ==
All compositions by Wade Marcus

1. "Past, Present and Future" - 5:16
2. "Fountain Scene" - 3:01
3. "Soul Food, African Shop" - 2:54
4. "Slight Fear and Terror" - 1:16
5. "Luanna's Theme" - 2:29
6. "The Final Comedown" - 3:28
7. "Afro Party" - 4:11
8. "Traveling to Get to Doc" - 1:41
9. "One Second After Death" - 1:40
10. "Father's Lament" - 2:49
11. "Battle Scene" - 6:46
- Recorded at A&R Studios, NYC on December 13 & 14, 1971

== Personnel ==
- Grant Green - guitar
- Irving Markowitz, Marvin Stamm - trumpet, flugelhorn
- Phil Bodner - flute, piccolo, alto saxophone, oboe
- Harold Vick - alto saxophone, tenor saxophone
- Julian Barber, Harry Zaratzian - viola
- Seymour Barab, Charles McCracken - cello
- Eugene Bianco - harp
- Warren Smith - marimba, tambourine
- George Devens - vibes, timpani, percussion
- Richard Tee - piano, organ
- Cornell Dupree - guitar
- Gordon Edwards - electric bass
- Grady Tate - drums
- Ralph MacDonald - conga, bongos
- Wade Marcus - composer, conductor
