= Neal Creque =

American musician

Earl Neal Creque (April 13, 1940 – December 1, 2000) was an American organist and jazz composer, born in the Virgin Islands; he was based in the Cleveland area, was a professor at the Oberlin Conservatory of Music, and played frequently around northern Ohio up until his death.

He also composed music with Mongo Santamaría including the Grammy Award-nominated song "Sofrito" which was sampled by Jennifer Lopez on the album J.Lo. Neal also wrote and played on, Grant Green's "Windjammer."

He was a sought after session musician and his credits include Stanley Turrentine, Teresa Brewer, Leon Thomas, Harold Ousley, Bernard Purdie, and Eddie "Cleanhead" Vinson.

Neal released three solo albums, the first being Creque, in 1972, followed by Contrast! and Neal Creque and the Hands of Time, both in 1974.

He died of kidney cancer in Olmsted Falls at the age of 60.

His daughter Nina Creque was part of Gerald Levert's group 1 of the Girls. She died of an undisclosed illness in 2019.

== Discography ==
=== As leader ===
- 1972: Creque (Cobblestone); re-released in 1981 as Black Velvet Rose (Muse)
- 1972: Contrast! (Cobblestone)
- 1974: Neal Creque & the Hands of Time (Muse)

=== As sideman ===
With Grant Green

- Carryin' On (Blue Note, 1969)
- Green Is Beautiful (Blue Note, 1970) includes "Windjammer"
- Alive! (Blue Note, 1970)

With Eric Kloss

- Doors (Cobblestone, 1972)

With Johnny Lytle

- Good Vibes (Muse, 1981)

With Harold Ousley

- The Kid! (Cobblestone, 1972)
- The People's Groove (Muse, 1977)

Pucho & His Latin Soul Brothers

- Shuckin' And Jivin' (Prestige, 1967)
- Big Stick (Prestige, 1967)
- Heat! (Prestige, 1968)
- Dateline (Prestige, 1969)

With Bernard Purdie

- Shaft (Prestige, 1971 [rel. 1973])

With Mongo Santamaria

- Mongo '70 (Atlantic, 1970)
- Mongo's Way (Atlantic, 1971)

With Melvin Sparks

- Sparkling (Muse, 1981)

With Leon Thomas

- Gold Sunrise on Magic Mountain (Mega/Flying Dutchman, 1971)
- Blues and the Soulful Truth (Flying Dutchman, 1972)
- Full Circle (Flying Dutchman, 1973)

With Eddie "Cleanhead" Vinson

- You Can't Make Love Alone (Mega/Flying Dutchman, 1971)
