= The Main Attraction (album) =

Studio album by Grant Green
- Released: 1976
- Recorded: March 19, 1976
- Studio: Van Gelder Studio, Englewood Cliffs, NJ
- Genre: Soul jazz, jazz-funk
- Length: 37:42
- Label: Kudu
- Producer: Creed Taylor

Grant Green chronology
Live at The Lighthouse (1972)	The Main Attraction (1976)	Easy (1978)

The Main Attraction is an album by American jazz guitarist Grant Green featuring performances recorded in 1976 and released on the Kudu label.

== Reception ==
The AllMusic review by Thom Jurek awarded the album two stars and stated "While it's true that this isn't one of Green's best records, it's not by any means his worst... Contrary to jazz critics' opinions, Green had nothing to be ashamed of on Main Attraction. If funky '70s soul-jazz is your thing, you won't go wrong with this one".

Professional ratings
Review scores
Source	Rating
Allmusic	2/5 stars
The Penguin Guide to Jazz Recordings	2/4 stars

== Track listing ==
1. "The Main Attraction" (Don Grolnick, Steve Khan, Will Lee, David Matthews, Andy Newmark) - 19:35
2. "Future Feature" (Matthews) - 7:47
3. "Creature" (Grant Green) - 10:20

- Recorded at Rudy Van Gelder Studio, Englewood Cliffs, New Jersey in March 1976 with additional recording at A&R Studios, NYC

== Personnel ==
- Grant Green - guitar
- Burt Collins, Jon Faddis - trumpet
- Sam Burtis - trombone
- Hubert Laws - flute
- Michael Brecker, Joe Farrell - tenor saxophone
- Ronnie Cuber - baritone saxophone
- Don Grolnick - electric piano, clavinet
- Steve Khan - rhythm guitar
- Will Lee - electric bass
- Andy Newmark - drums
- Carlos Charles - conga, percussion
- Sue Evans - percussion
- Dave Matthews - arranger, conductor
