= Shades of Green (album) =

Studio album by Grant Green
- Released: 1972
- Recorded: November 23–24, 1971
- Genre: Jazz
- Length: 37:06
- Label: Blue Note
- Producer: George Butler

Grant Green chronology
| Visions (1971) | Shades of Green (1972) | The Final Comedown (1971) |

Shades of Green is an album by American jazz guitarist Grant Green featuring performances recorded in 1971 and released on the Blue Note label.

== Reception ==
Professional ratings
Review scores
| Source | Rating |
|---|---|
| AllMusic | 2/5 stars |

The Allmusic review by Michael Erlewine awarded the album 2 stars and stated "This is not the old Grant Green".

== Track listing ==
1. "Medley: I Don't Want Nobody to Give Me Nothing (Open Up the Door I'll Get It Myself) / Cold Sweat" (James Brown) – 5:52
2. "Sunrise, Sunset" (Jerry Bock, Sheldon Harnick) – 4:40
3. "Never My Love" (Donald Adrissi, Richard Addrisi) – 4:30
4. "Got to Be There" (Elliot Willensky) – 4:24
5. "California Green" (Grant Green) – 6:24
6. "If You Really Love Me" (Stevie Wonder, Syreeta Wright) – 4:25
7. "Cast Your Fate to the Wind" (Vince Guaraldi) – 4:50
8. "In the Middle" (Alfred Ellis, Buddy Hobgood) – 5:02

- Recorded at United Artists Studios, West Hollywood, CA on November 23 (tracks 1, 5 & 8), & November 24 (tracks 2–4, 6 & 7), 1971 with horn overdubs recorded at Rudy Van Gelder Studio, Englewood Cliffs, New Jersey on December 16 & 17, 1971

== Personnel ==
=== Musicians ===
- Grant Green – guitar
- Billy Wooten – vibraphone
- Emmanuel Riggins – electric piano, clavinet
- Wilton Felder – electric bass
- Nesbert "Stix" Hooper – drums
- King Errisson – conga
- Harold Cardwell – percussion
- Orchestra arranged by Wade Marcus

=== Additional musicians ===
- Joe Newman, Joe Wilder, Victor Paz, James Sedlar – trumpet
- Harry DiVito – trombone
- Dick Hickson – bass trombone
- Jim Buffington – French horn
- Phil Bodner, Romeo Penque, George Marge, John Leone – woodwinds

=== Technical personnel ===
- Christina Hersch – engineer
- Rudy Van Gelder – remixing
- Norman Seeff – art direction
