= Oleo (Grant Green album) =

Studio album by Grant Green
- Released: 1980
- Recorded: January 31, 1962
- Studio: Van Gelder Studio, Englewood Cliffs
- Genre: Jazz
- Length: 37:22
- Label: Blue Note; GXF 3065
- Producer: Alfred Lion

Grant Green chronology
Nigeria (1962)	Oleo (1980)	Born to Be Blue (1962)

Oleo is an album by American jazz guitarist Grant Green featuring performances recorded in 1962 and released on the Blue Note label in Japan in 1980. It features Green with pianist Sonny Clark, bassist Sam Jones and drummer Louis Hayes. The tracks were later re-issued in 1997 as part of The Complete Quartets with Sonny Clark.

== Reception ==
Professional ratings
Review scores
Source	Rating
AllMusic	4.5/5 stars
The Encyclopedia of Popular Music	4/5 stars

The AllMusic review by Michael Erlewine called Oleo "another excellent album with Green and pianist Sonny Clark".

== Track listing ==
1. "Oleo" (Sonny Rollins) – 5:37
2. "Little Girl Blue" (Lorenz Hart, Richard Rodgers) – 7:15
3. "Tune-Up" (Eddie Vinson) – 7:19
4. "Hip Funk" (Grant Green) – 8:39
5. "My Favorite Things" (Oscar Hammerstein II, Richard Rodgers) – 8:32

== Personnel ==
- Grant Green - guitar
- Sonny Clark - piano
- Sam Jones - bass
- Louis Hayes - drums
