= Elder Don =

Studio album by Don Wilkerson
- Released: 1962
- Recorded: May 3, 1962
- Studio: Van Gelder Studio, Englewood Cliffs, NJ
- Genre: Jazz
- Length: 34:45
- Label: Blue Note; BST 84121
- Producer: Alfred Lion

Don Wilkerson chronology
The Texas Twister (1960)	Elder Don (1962)	Preach Brother! (1962)

Elder Don is an album by American saxophonist Don Wilkerson recorded in 1962 and released on the Blue Note label. It was recorded a month before Preach Brother!, but released later.

== Reception ==
Professional ratings
Review scores
Source	Rating
Down Beat	3.5/5 stars
Allmusic	4.5/5 stars

Jazz critic Harvey Pekar had this to say in his May 23, 1963 review for Down Beat magazine: "Though not an innovator, the leader is a respectable musician. His style is an amalgam of many sources..."

The Allmusic review by Stephen Thomas Erlewine awarded the album 4½ stars and stated "records like this go a long way in proving that Wilkerson was one of the great underrated saxophonists of his time".

== Track listing ==
All compositions by Don Wilkerson except as indicated

1. "Señorita Eula" - 4:52
2. "San Antonio Rose" (Bob Wills) - 7:45
3. "Scrappy" - 4:51
4. "Lone Star Shuffle" - 6:52
5. "Drawin' a Tip" - 4:44
6. "Poor Butterfly" (John Golden, Raymond Hubbell) - 5:41

== Personnel ==
- Don Wilkerson - tenor saxophone
- John Acea - piano
- Grant Green - guitar
- Lloyd Trotman - bass
- Willie Bobo - drums
