= Dearly Beloved (Stanley Turrentine album) =

Studio album by Stanley Turrentine
- Released: February 1962
- Recorded: June 8, 1961; Van Gelder Studio, Englewood Cliffs
- Genre: Jazz
- Length: 44:44
- Label: Blue Note; BST 84081
- Producer: Alfred Lion

Stanley Turrentine chronology
Up at "Minton's" (1961)	Dearly Beloved (1962)	ZT's Blues (1961)

Professional ratings
Review scores
Source	Rating
Allmusic	4/5 stars

Dearly Beloved is an album by jazz saxophonist Stanley Turrentine recorded for the Blue Note label and performed by Turrentine with Shirley Scott and Roy Brooks.

== Reception ==
The Allmusic review by Steve Leggett awarded the album 4 stars stating "it remains one of Turrentine's finest Blue Note outings".

== Track listing ==
1. "Baia" (Ary Barroso) - 5:32
2. "Wee Hour Theme" (Turrentine) - 4:42
3. "My Shining Hour" (Arlen, Mercer) - 6:52
4. "Troubles of the World" (Traditional) - 5:15
5. "Yesterdays" (Otto Harbach, Jerome Kern) - 8:50
6. "Dearly Beloved" (Kern, Mercer) - 7:13
7. "Nothing Ever Changes My Love for You" (Marvin Fisher, Jack Segal) - 6:20

== Personnel ==
- Stanley Turrentine - tenor saxophone
- Shirley Scott - organ
- Roy Brooks - drums

=== Production ===
- Alfred Lion - producer
- Reid Miles - design
- Rudy Van Gelder - engineer
- Francis Wolff - photography
