= Visions (Grant Green album) =

Studio album by Grant Green
- Released: September 1971
- Recorded: May 21, 1971
- Studio: Van Gelder Studio, Englewood Cliffs, NJ
- Genre: Jazz
- Length: 37:06
- Label: Blue Note
- Producer: George Butler

Grant Green chronology
Live at Club Mozambique (1971)	Visions (1971)	Shades of Green (1971)

Visions is an album by American jazz guitarist Grant Green featuring performances recorded in 1971 and released on the Blue Note label.

== Recording and music ==
The album contains renditions of several contemporary pop and classical tunes. As well as an interpretation of the 1st Movement of Mozart's Symphony No. 40, "Maybe Tomorrow" incorporates a melodic motif from Maurice Ravel's Pavane pour une infante défunte. "Maybe Tomorrow" was in turn sampled by American hip-hop artist Kendrick Lamar on his 2012 song "Sing About Me, I'm Dying of Thirst".

== Reception ==
Professional ratings
Review scores
Source	Rating
Allmusic	3/5 stars
DownBeat	3/5 stars

The Allmusic review by Stephen Thomas Erlewine awarded the album 3 stars and stated "Visions is a bit laid-back, and the electric piano-heavy arrangements are a little dated, but Grant Green never made a commercial pop-jazz album as appealing and satisfying".

== Track listing ==
1. "Does Anybody Really Know What Time It Is?" (Robert Lamm) - 5:10
2. "Maybe Tomorrow" (Marilyn Bergman, Alan Bergman, Quincy Jones) - 4:54
3. "Mozart Symphony #40 in G Minor, K550, 1st Movement" (Wolfgang Amadeus Mozart) - 4:06
4. "Love on a Two-Way Street" (Bert Keyes, Sylvia Robinson) - 4:43
5. "Cantaloupe Woman" (Ben Dixon) - 5:29
6. "We've Only Just Begun" (Roger Nichols, Paul Williams) - 5:09
7. "Never Can Say Goodbye" (Clifton Davis) - 5:04
8. "Blues for Abraham" (Eloise Riggins) - 2:31

- Recorded at Rudy Van Gelder Studio, Englewood Cliffs, New Jersey on May 21, 1971

== Personnel ==
- Grant Green - guitar
- Billy Wooten - vibes
- Emmanuel Riggins - electric piano
- Chuck Rainey - electric bass
- Idris Muhammad - drums
- Ray Armando - conga
- Harold Caldwell - drums, percussion
