= Piano (Wynton Kelly album) =

Studio album by Wynton Kelly
- Released: 1958
- Recorded: January 31, 1958
- Studio: Metropolitan Studios, New York City
- Genre: Jazz
- Length: 46:28
- Label: Riverside
- Producer: Orrin Keepnews

Wynton Kelly chronology
Piano Interpretations (1951)	Piano (1958)	Kelly Blue (1959)

Professional ratings
Review scores
Source	Rating
Allmusic	4.5/5 stars
The Penguin Guide to Jazz	3/4 stars

Piano, also released as Whisper Not, is an album by jazz pianist Wynton Kelly that was released by Riverside in 1958. Kelly recorded the album with Kenny Burrell, Paul Chambers, and Philly Joe Jones.

== Reception ==
AllMusic gave the album four and a half stars and called it "an important recording" that displays Kelly's "distinctive drive and buoyant swing feel".

== Track listing ==
All compositions by Wynton Kelly except as indicated

1. "Whisper Not" (Benny Golson) – 7:12
2. "Action" – 7:12
3. "Dark Eyes" (Traditional) – 5:59
4. "Strong Man" (Oscar Brown, Jr.) – 5:17
5. "Ill Wind" (Harold Arlen, Ted Koehler) – 4:25
6. "Don't Explain" (Billie Holiday, Arthur Herzog Jr.) – 5:36
7. "You Can't Get Away" – 6:24
8. "Dark Eyes" [Take 2] (Traditional) – 5:19

== Personnel ==
- Wynton Kelly – piano
- Kenny Burrell – guitar
- Paul Chambers – double bass
- Philly Joe Jones – drums (1–3, 8)
