= Pucho & His Latin Soul Brothers =

Latin jazz, soul jazz and R&B group

- Genres: Latin jazz; soul jazz; R&B
- Years active: 1959–1973
- Labels: Prestige, Right On, Milestone, Timeless, Cannonball
- Past members: Henry "Pucho" Brown

Pucho & His Latin Soul Brothers was a Latin jazz, soul jazz and R&B group formed in 1959 by timbales player Henry "Pucho" Brown. Chick Corea is among the many musicians who performed with him (albeit prior to Pucho's recording career).

Henry "Pucho" Brown was born on November 1, 1938 in Harlem, New York City. In his youth he was exposed to the Latin music, jazz and rhythm and blues genres. He began playing timbales at age 15. His early professional experience was with Los Lobos Diablos and with Joe Panama.

Following the breakup of Panama's band, Pucho formed 'Pucho and the Cha Cha Boys.' That band would go onto become the core of his band: Pucho Brown on percussion, Eddie Pazant on reeds, Al Pazant on trumpet, William Bivens, Jr., on vibraphone, and Neal Creque on piano and organ. The early 1960s version of the band included Steve Berrios, Chick Corea and Bobby Capers. However, Mongo Santamaria hired many of his players away.

Pucho reorganized the band and named it, the 'Latin Soul Brothers.' He signed with Prestige Records in 1966 and recorded seven albums that would become definitive in the new boogaloo musical genre.

In 1973 he disbanded the group and focused more on traditional Latin music.

In the 1990s his music received contemporary interest from the British Acid Jazz scene. The re-formed Latin Soul Brothers continue to perform into the 21st century.

In 2003, Pucho was inducted into the International Latin Music Hall of Fame, only the second African-American, after Dizzy Gillespie. He died on September 21, 2022.

== Discography ==
- Tough! (Prestige, 1966)
- Saffron And Soul (Prestige, 1966; reissued on BGP/Ace in 2012)
- Shuckin' And Jivin' (Prestige, 1967; reissued on BGP/Ace in 2012)
- Big Stick (Prestige, 1967; reissued on BGP/Ace in 2012)
- Heat! (Prestige, 1968; reissued on BGP/Ace in 1992)
- Dateline (Prestige, 1969; reissued on BGP/Ace in 2012)
- Jungle Fire! (Prestige, 1970; reissued on BGP/Ace in 1992)
- Yaina (Right-On Records, 1971; reissued on CuBop/Ubiquity in 1996)
- Super Freak (Zanzee Records, 1972; reissued on CuBop/Ubiquity in 1996)
- Jungle Strut (Lexington/West 47th, 1993; reissued as Pucho's Descarga on ¡Andale! in 2014) - with Bernard Purdie, Melvin Sparks
- Rip A Dip (Milestone, 1995)
- Mucho Pucho (Timeless, 1997)
- Groovin' High (Cannonball, 1997)
- Caliente Con Soul! (CuBop/Ubiquity, 1999)
- How'M I Doin'? (Cannonball, 2000)
- The Hideout (Milestone, 2004)

=== Compilations ===
- The Best Of Pucho & The Latin Soul Brothers With Jackie "Soul" Thompson (Prestige PR-7679, 1969) (compilation of three albums: Shuckin' And Jivin' , Big Stick, Heat!)
- The Best Of Pucho & The Latin Soul Brothers (BGP/Ace, 1993) (compilation drawn from all 7 Pucho albums on Prestige)
- Tough! (Prestige, 1994) (compilation of Tough! + Saffron And Soul)
- The Best Of Pucho & His Latin Soul Brothers (Prestige, 1996) (compilation drawn from 5 different Pucho albums)
- Cold Shoulder (Prestige, 2000) (compilation drawn from 4 different Pucho albums)
