= Sunday Mornin' (album) =

Studio album by Grant Green
- Released: End of November 1962
- Recorded: June 4, 1961
- Studio: Van Gelder Studio; Englewood Cliffs, New Jersey
- Genre: Jazz
- Length: 47:04 (CD)
- Label: Blue Note; BLP 4099
- Producer: Alfred Lion

Grant Green chronology
Green Street (1961)	Sunday Mornin' (1962)	Grantstand (1961)

Sunday Mornin' is an album by American jazz guitarist Grant Green recorded for Blue Note on June 4, 1961 and released the following year. Bassist Ben Tucker returned from Green’s previous album, joined by pianist Kenny Drew and Ben Dixon.

== Reception ==
Professional ratings
Review scores
Source	Rating
AllMusic	3/5 stars
All About Jazz	4.5/5 stars
Encyclopedia of Popular Music	4/5 stars
The Penguin Guide to Jazz Recordings	3/4 stars

The AllMusic review by Steve Huey states, "Green is tasteful and elegant as always, and the results make for an enjoyable addition to his discography, even if there are more distinctive Green albums available."

The All About Jazz review by Norman Weinstein awarded the album 4.5, stating, "There's not a bad tune on this peerless set, and whatever your feelings about Green's place in jazz history, it's highly recommended."

== Track listing ==
All compositions by Grant Green except as indicated

=== Side 1 ===
1. "Freedom March" – 8:42
2. "Sunday Mornin'" – 4:01
3. "Exodus" (Ernest Gold) – 7:01

=== Side 2 ===
1. "God Bless the Child" (Arthur Herzog, Jr. Billie Holiday) – 7:21
2. "Come Sunrise" – 4:32
3. "So What" (Miles Davis) – 9:48

=== CD reissue bonus track ===
7. "Tracin' Tracy" – 5:39

== Personnel ==
=== Musicians ===
- Grant Green – guitar
- Kenny Drew – piano
- Ben Tucker – bass
- Ben Dixon – drums

=== Technical personnel ===
- Alfred Lion – producer
- Rudy Van Gelder – recording engineer
- Reid Miles – design
- Francis Wolff – photography
- Joe Goldberg – liner notes
