= Mo' Rock =

Studio album by Baby Face Willette
- Released: 1964
- Recorded: February 4 and March 17, 1964
- Studio: Ter Mar Recording Studio, Chicago, Illinois
- Genre: Jazz
- Length: 38:15
- Label: Argo; LP-739
- Producer: Esmond Edwards

Baby Face Willette chronology
Stop and Listen (1961)	Mo' Rock (1964)	Behind the 8 Ball (1964)

Mo' Rock is an album by organist Baby Face Willette recorded in 1964 and released on the Argo label.

== Reception ==
Professional ratings
Review scores
Source	Rating
Allmusic	3/5 stars

Allmusic awarded the album 3 stars stating "Overall, Mo' Rock isn't quite up to the level of Willette's Blue Note sessions, but it's still a very respectable outing, and given the unfortunate skimpiness of his discography, his fans should find it rewarding enough to seek out".

== Track listing ==
All compositions by Roosevelt "Baby Face" Willette except where noted

1. "Mo-Roc" - 4:51
2. "Bantu Penda" - 5:19
3. "Dad's Theme" - 5:30
4. "But Not for Me" (George Gershwin, Ira Gershwin) - 4:12
5. "Misty" (Johnny Burke, Erroll Garner) - 3:58
6. "Unseen and Unknown" - 4:19
7. "Zip Five" - 5:19
8. "Sight in Darkness" - 5:09

== Personnel ==
- Baby Face Willette - organ
- Ben White - guitar
- Eugene Bass - drums
