= Baby Face Willette =

American jazz organist

- Born: Roosevelt James Willett; September 11, 1933; Little Rock, Arkansas, United States
- Died: April 1, 1971 (aged 37) Chicago, Illinois, U.S.
- Genres: Rhythm and blues, jazz
- Instruments: Piano, organ
- Years active: c. 1950–1970
- Labels: Vee-Jay, Blue Note, Argo

Roosevelt "Baby Face" Willette (September 11, 1933 – April 1, 1971) was an American hard bop and soul-jazz musician who played the Hammond organ.

== Life and career ==
He was born Roosevelt James Willett (no "e"), in Little Rock, Arkansas, in 1933 according to researchers Bob Eagle and Eric LeBlanc, though other sources state 1934 or 1937. According to the liner notes on his first Blue Note album, Grant’s First Stand, Willette was born in New Orleans.

His mother was a missionary who played the piano in the church where his father was a minister. As a result, his musical roots were in gospel. Willette became involved in music by playing the piano for various gospel groups, and accompanied his sisters Dorothy and Georgia, who toured and recorded as the Willett Sisters. He spent his early career travelling across the United States, Canada and Cuba, as pianist with the bands of King Kolax, Joe Houston, Johnny Otis and Big Jay McNeely, among others.

He made his first recording as Baby Face Willette ("Wake Up, Get Out" b/w "Cool Blues") in Los Angeles in 1952, but soon moved to Chicago and married in September 1955. Shortly thereafter he recorded four tracks for Vee-Jay Records, from which "Can't Keep From Lovin' You" and "Why" were released as a single in February 1956. He played in both rhythm and blues and jazz bands, playing piano before switching to organ around 1958. His organ playing was inspired by Jimmy Smith's work, though Willette's style is more heavily influenced by gospel, blues and soul jazz than Smith's. Willette was also a professional hairdresser. Before his time in New York City, he was based out of Milwaukee, playing with his vocalist wife Jo Gibson at clubs such as The Flame Club, The Pelican Club, The Moonglow and Max's among others.

In late 1960, after splitting from his wife and addicted to heroin, he arrived in New York City where he met Lou Donaldson and Grant Green, and played on a few Blue Note sessions with them. This led to Willette being signed to Blue Note, which recorded his debut album Face to Face in 1961. In New York, he spent some two years in prison for robbery and assault, between late 1961 and 1963.

After his release, he returned to Chicago and formed his own trio in 1963. He recorded two more albums for Argo. The first was named in honor of the Moroccan Village, where the trio that made this album had been performing since the previous autumn. Later, he regularly played piano and organ at a neighborhood lounge on the west side of Chicago, the Squeeze Club on 16th and Homan.

After some time in California, failing health forced a return to Chicago, where his family resided. He died in 1971, from bronchial pneumonia.

== Discography ==
=== As leader ===
- Face to Face (Blue Note, 1961)
- Stop and Listen (Blue Note, 1961)
- Mo' Rock (Argo, 1964)
- Behind the 8 Ball (Argo, 1964 [rel. 1965])

=== As sideman ===
- Lou Donaldson - Here 'Tis (Blue Note, 1961)
- Grant Green - Grant's First Stand (Blue Note, 1961)
