= Shadrack (Robert MacGimsey song) =

1930s song written by Robert MacGimsey

"Shadrack" (aka "Shadrach" or "Shadrach, Meshach and Abednego") is a popular song written by Robert MacGimsey in the 1930s and performed by Louis Armstrong and others.

== Background ==
The lyrics refer to the biblical account of Shadrach, Meshach, and Abednego and the fiery furnace.

== Brook Benton version ==
"Shadrack"

Single by Brook Benton

from the album Golden Hits, Volume 2
- B-side: "The Lost Penny"
- Released: January 1962
- Recorded: 1961
- Genre: R&B
- Length: 2:20
- Label: Mercury Records
- Songwriter: Robert MacGimsey

Brook Benton singles chronology
"Revenge" (1961)	"Shadrack" (1962)	"The Lost Penny" (1962)

In 1962 the song was a hit single for Brook Benton, peaking at No. 19 on the Billboard Hot 100 chart the week of February 17, 1962.

=== Charts ===
Chart (1962)	Peak position
Canada CHUM Chart	4
US Billboard Hot 100	19

== Other cover versions ==
The song is featured on pop, soul, gospel and jazz recordings by others, among them:

- Toshiko Akiyoshi
- The Ames Brothers
- The Golden Gate Quartet
- The Fairfield Four
- Benny Goodman
- Grant Green
- Phil Harris
- Bill Holman
- The Larks
- Louis Prima
- Sonny Rollins
- Bobby Scott
- Kay Starr
- Sister Rosetta Tharpe

== Popular culture ==
- In the 1951 film The Strip, the song is performed by a band featuring Louis Armstrong and Jack Teagarden, among others.
