= Green Is Beautiful =

Studio album by Grant Green
- Released: July 1970
- Recorded: January 30, 1970
- Studio: Van Gelder Studio, Englewood Cliffs, NJ
- Genre: Jazz
- Length: 37:33
- Label: Blue Note
- Producer: Francis Wolff

Grant Green chronology
Carryin' On (1969)	Green Is Beautiful (1970)	Alive! (1970)

Professional ratings
Review scores
Source	Rating
Allmusic	3/5 stars
The Penguin Guide to Jazz Recordings	2/4 stars

Green Is Beautiful is an album by American jazz guitarist Grant Green featuring performances recorded in 1970 and released on the Blue Note label.

== Reception ==
The Allmusic review by Steve Huey awarded the album 3 stars and stated "Green Is Beautiful finds the guitarist growing more comfortable with harder, funkier R&B than he seemed on the softer-hued Carryin' On... Green Is Beautiful proves that Green's reinvention as a jazz-funk artist wasn't the misguided disaster it was initially made out to be".

== Track listing ==
No.	Title	Writer(s)	Length
1.	"Ain't It Funky Now"	James Brown	9:58
2.	"A Day in the Life"	John Lennon, Paul McCartney	9:02
3.	"The Windjammer"	Neal Creque	5:42
4.	"I'll Never Fall in Love Again"	Burt Bacharach, Hal David	6:46
5.	"Dracula"	Creque	6:05

Recorded at Rudy Van Gelder Studio, Englewood Cliffs, New Jersey on January 30, 1970

== Personnel ==
- Grant Green - guitar
- Blue Mitchell - trumpet
- Claude Bartee - tenor saxophone
- Neal Creque (track 3), Emmanuel Riggins (tracks 1, 2, 4 & 5) - organ
- Jimmy Lewis - electric bass
- Idris Muhammad - drums
- Candido Camero - conga
- Richie "Pablo" Landrum - bongos
