= Alive! (Grant Green album) =

Live album by Grant Green
- Released: 1970
- Recorded: August 15, 1970
- Venue: Cliche Lounge, Newark, New Jersey
- Genre: Jazz-funk
- Length: 36:45
- Label: Blue Note
- Producer: Francis Wolff

Grant Green chronology
Green Is Beautiful (1970)	Alive! (1970)	Live at Club Mozambique (1971)

Alive! is an album by American jazz guitarist Grant Green featuring a performance recorded at the Cliche Lounge in Newark, New Jersey in 1970 and released on the Blue Note label. The album was Green's first official live recording. The CD reissue in 1993 added three bonus tracks.

== Reception ==
Professional ratings
Review scores
Source	Rating
Allmusic	4/5 stars
The Penguin Guide to Jazz	3.5/4 stars

The Allmusic review by Steve Huey awarded the album 4 stars and stated "Alive! is the hardest funk LP Grant Green recorded during the later phase of his career... this is the most convincing and consistent Green had been as a funkster and, while nearly all of his albums from the early '70s feature at least some worthwhile material for acid jazz and beat-sampling junkies, Alive! is probably the best place to start".

"The Penguin Guide to Jazz" review by Richard Cook and Brian Morton stated: "It seems remarkable that Blue Note weren't more enthusiastic sooner about recording Green in his natural setting. This, from the Cliché Lounge in Newark, is almost his best recording for the label, a burning, sweaty club that might rely a bit on the very commodity it was named for, but none the worse of that."

== Track listing ==
1. "Let the Music Take Your Mind" (Kool & the Gang, Gene Redd) - 8:42
2. "Time To Remember" (Neal Creque) - 11:19
3. Band introduction by Buddy Green - 0:32
4. "Sookie, Sookie" (Don Covay, Steve Cropper) - 11:10
5. "Down Here on the Ground" (Gale Garnett, Lalo Schifrin) - 6:45

Bonus tracks on CD reissue:

6. "Hey, Western Union Man" (Jerry Butler, Kenny Gamble, Leon Huff) - 7:46
7. "It's Your Thing" (Ronald Isley, O'Kelly Isley, Jr., Rudolph Isley) - 9:17
8. "Maiden Voyage" (Herbie Hancock) - 10:58

== Personnel ==
- Grant Green - guitar
- Claude Bartee - tenor saxophone
- Willie Bivens - vibes
- Neal Creque (tracks 2 & 5), Ronnie Foster (tracks 1, 4 & 6–8) - organ
- Idris Muhammad - drums
- Joseph Armstrong - congas
- Buddy Green - announcer
