= Grantstand =

Studio album by Grant Green
- Released: April 1962
- Recorded: August 1, 1961
- Studios: Van Gelder Studio, Englewood Cliffs
- Genres: Soul jazz, jazz blues
- Length: 42:30
- Labels: Blue Note; BST 84086
- Producer: Alfred Lion

Grant Green chronology
Sunday Mornin' (1961)	Grantstand (1962)	Remembering (1961)

Grantstand is an album by American jazz guitarist Grant Green featuring performances recorded in 1961 and released on the Blue Note label in 1962. Green is heard in a quartet with saxophonist Yusef Lateef, organist Jack McDuff, and drummer Al Harewood. The CD reissue released in 1987 features one bonus track from the same session.

== Reception ==
Professional ratings
Review scores
Source	Rating
Allmusic	4/5 stars
Encyclopedia of Popular Music	5/5 stars
The Penguin Guide to Jazz Recordings	3/4 stars

The Allmusic review by Steve Huey awarded the album 4 stars and stated "if you're looking for Green the soul-jazz groovemaster, Grantstand is an excellent place to find him".

== Track listing ==
All compositions by Grant Green except as indicated

1. "Grantstand" – 9:03
2. "My Funny Valentine" (Lorenz Hart, Richard Rodgers) – 9:06
3. "Blues in Maude's Flat" – 15:00
4. "Old Folks" (Dedette Lee Hill, Willard Robison) – 4:11
5. "Green's Greenery" – 5:10 [Bonus track on CD reissue]

== Personnel ==
- Grant Green – guitar
- Yusef Lateef – tenor saxophone (except track 4), flute (track 2)
- Brother Jack McDuff – organ
- Al Harewood – drums
