= The Final Comedown =

1972 film by Oscar Williams

- Theatrical release poster
- Directed by: Oscar Williams
- Written by: Oscar Williams
- Produced by: Edgar Charles; Roger Corman; Mel Taylor; Oscar Williams
- Starring: Billy Dee Williams; D'Urville Martin; Celia Kaye; Billy Durkin; Raymond St. Jacques
- Cinematography: William B. Kaplan
- Edited by: Dick Van Enger Jr.
- Music by: Grant Green; Wade Marcus
- Distributed by: New World Pictures
- Release date: May 31, 1972
- Running time: 83 minutes
- Country: United States
- Language: English
- Budget: $26,500

The Final Comedown is a 1972 blaxploitation drama film written, produced and directed by Oscar Williams and starring Billy Dee Williams and D'Urville Martin. The film is an examination of racism in the United States and depicts a shootout between a radical black nationalist group and the police, with the backstory leading up to the shootout told through flashbacks. The radical group is not identified by name in the film but closely resembles the Black Panther Party.

The film was recut and re-released in 1976 under the title Blast! The new version featured additional footage directed by Allan Arkush, credited under the pseudonym "Frank Arthur Wilson."

The original version has had several releases on DVD from various budget-line DVD manufacturers.

== Cast ==
- Billy Dee Williams
- D'Urville Martin
- Celia Kaye
- Billy Durkin
- Raymond St. Jacques

== Production ==
Roger Corman put up $15,000 of the film's budget.
