= Piano Interpretations =

Studio album by Wynton Kelly
- Released: 1951
- Recorded: July 25 & August 1, 1951
- Studio: WOR Studios, New York City
- Genre: Jazz
- Length: 58:10
- Label: Blue Note
- Producer: Alfred Lion

Wynton Kelly chronology
Piano Interpretations (1951)	Piano (1958)

Piano Interpretations is the début album by jazz pianist Wynton Kelly released on the Blue Note label featuring performances by Kelly with Oscar Pettiford/Franklin Skeete, and Lee Abrams recorded in 1951. The CD reissue features 11 additional tracks.

== Reception ==
The Allmusic review by Scott Yanow states: "Kelly in 1951 was already long on his way to achieving his own sound. Influenced most by Bud Powell but also displaying some of the joy of Teddy Wilson's style along with his own chord voicings, Kelly gives listeners no hints on this enjoyable CD (which has two complete sessions plus three alternate takes) that he was still a teenager".

Professional ratings
Review scores
Source	Rating
Allmusic	4/5 stars

== Track listing ==
1. "Blue Moon" (Lorenz Hart, Richard Rodgers) - 3:09
2. "Fine and Dandy" (Paul James, Kay Swift) - 2:50
3. "I Found a New Baby" (Jack Palmer, Spencer Williams) - 2:53
4. "Cherokee" (Ray Noble) - 3:08
5. "Born to Be Blue" (Mel Torme, Robert Wells) - 3:26
6. "Where or When" (Hart, Rodgers) - 2:52
7. "Moonglow" (Eddie DeLange, Will Hudson, Irving Mills) - 3:29
8. "Moonglow" [alternate take] (DeLange, Hudson, Mills) - 3:11
9. "If I Should Lose You" (Ralph Rainger, Leo Robin) - 3:04
10. "Born to Be Blue" [alternate take] (Torme, Wells) - 3:00
11. "Goodbye" [1st Take] (Gordon Jenkins) - 2:23
12. "Goodbye" [2nd Take] (Jenkins) - 2:47
13. "Foolin' Myself" (Jack Lawrence, Peter Tinturin) - 3:03
14. "There Will Never Be Another You" (Mack Gordon, Harry Warren) - 3:03
15. "Do Nothin' Till You Hear from Me" (Duke Ellington, Bob Russell) - 3:04
16. "Summertime" (George Gershwin, Ira Gershwin, Dubose Heyward) - 3:11
17. "Moonlight in Vermont" (John Blackburn, Karl Suessdorf) - 3:26
18. "Crazy He Calls Me" (Bob Russell, Carl Sigman) - 3:18
19. "Rhythm-a-Ning" (Thelonious Monk, Charlie Christian) / "Opus Caprice" (Al Haig) - 2:53

- Recorded at WOR Studios in New York City on July 25, 1951 (tracks 1–10) and August 1, 1951 (tracks 11–19).

== Personnel ==
=== Musicians ===
- Wynton Kelly – piano (all tracks), celeste (track 17)
- Oscar Pettiford (tracks 1 & 5–10), Franklin Skeete (tracks 2–4 & 11–19) – bass
- Lee Abrams – drums, congas

=== Production ===
- Gil Mellé – design
- Francis Wolff – photography
