= Nigeria (Grant Green album) =

Studio album by Grant Green
- Released: 1980
- Recorded: January 13, 1962
- Studio: Van Gelder Studio, Englewood Cliffs, NJ
- Genre: Jazz
- Length: 37:24
- Label: Blue Note; LT 1032
- Producer: Alfred Lion

Grant Green chronology
Gooden's Corner (1961)	Nigeria (1980)	Oleo (1962)

Alternative cover
- Japanese issue

Nigeria is an album by American jazz guitarist Grant Green featuring performances recorded for the Blue Note label on January 13, 1962 but not released until 1980. Pianist Sonny Clark and bassist Sam Jones return from Green’s previous session, Gooden's Corner, and are joined by legendary drummer, Art Blakey. The tracks were also released in 1997 as part of The Complete Quartets with Sonny Clark.

== Reception ==
Professional ratings
Review scores
Source	Rating
Allmusic	4.5/5 stars
Encyclopedia of Popular Music	3/5 stars

The Allmusic review by Michael Erlewine awarded the album 4½ stars and stated "Just classic Green".

== Track listing ==
1. "Airegin" (Sonny Rollins) - 7:32
2. "It Ain't Necessarily So" (George Gershwin, Ira Gershwin) - 10:22
3. "I Concentrate on You" (Cole Porter) - 5:48
4. "The Things We Did Last Summer" (Sammy Cahn, Jule Styne) - 5:56
5. "The Song Is You" (Oscar Hammerstein II, Jerome Kern) - 7:46

== Personnel ==
- Grant Green - guitar
- Sonny Clark - piano
- Sam Jones - bass
- Art Blakey - drums
