= Face to Face (Baby Face Willette album) =

Studio album by Baby Face Willette
- Released: 1961
- Recorded: January 30, 1961
- Studio: Van Gelder Studio, Englewood Cliffs
- Genre: Jazz
- Length: 54:46
- Label: Blue Note; BST 84068
- Producer: Alfred Lion

Baby Face Willette chronology
Face to Face (1961)	Stop and Listen (1961)

Face to Face is the debut album by jazz organist Baby Face Willette featuring performances recorded and released on the Blue Note label in 1961.

== Reception ==
Professional ratings
Review scores
Source	Rating
AllMusic	4/5 stars
DownBeat	3/5 stars
The Penguin Guide to Jazz Recordings	3/4 stars

The contemporaneous DownBeat reviewer stated: "If it is warm and appealing visceral music, it is also wholly predictable. There's not a single surprise on either side". The AllMusic review by Thom Jurek awarded the album 4 stars and stated "Face to Face boasts a mighty meat and potatoes soul-jazz lineup... Highly recommended".

== Track listing ==
All compositions by Baby Face Willette except as indicated

1. "Swingin' at Sugar Ray's" - 6:35
2. "Goin' Down" - 7:24
3. "Whatever Lola Wants" (Richard Adler, Jerry Ross) - 7:21
4. "Face to Face" - 6:17
5. "Somethin' Strange" - 6:42
6. "High 'N' Low" - 7:07
7. "Face to Face" [Alternate take] - 6:52 Bonus track on CD reissue
8. "Somethin' Strange" [Alternate take] - 6:41 Bonus track on CD reissue

== Personnel ==
- Baby Face Willette – organ
- Grant Green – guitar
- Ben Dixon – drums
- Fred Jackson – tenor saxophone
