= Born to Be Blue (Grant Green album) =

Studio album by Grant Green
- Released: 1985
- Recorded: March 1, 1962, December 23, 1961 ("Count Every Star")
- Studio: Van Gelder Studio, Englewood Cliffs, NJ
- Genre: Hard bop
- Length: LP 37:42; CD 58:22
- Label: Blue Note
- Producer: Alfred Lion

Grant Green chronology
Oleo (1962)	Born to Be Blue (1985)	The Latin Bit (1962)

Born to Be Blue is an album by American jazz guitarist Grant Green featuring performances recorded for Blue Note on March 1, 1962 but not released until 1985. Green is accompanied by tenor saxophonist Ike Quebec, pianist Sonny Clark, bassist Sam Jones and drummer Louis Hayes.

== Critical reception ==
Professional ratings
Review scores
Source	Rating
Allmusic	4.5/5 stars
Encyclopedia of Popular Music	5/5 stars
The Penguin Guide to Jazz Recordings	4/4 stars

The AllMusic review by Alex Henderson awarded the album 4½ stars and stated "Although Grant Green provided his share of groove-oriented soul-jazz and modal post-bop, his roots were hard bop, and it is in a bop-oriented setting that the guitarist excels on Born to Be Blue".

== Track listing ==
No.	Title	Writer(s)	Length
1.	"Someday My Prince Will Come"	Frank Churchill, Larry Morey	6:26
2.	"Born to Be Blue"	Mel Tormé, Robert Wells	4:52
3.	"Born to Be Blue" (Alternate take; Bonus track on CD reissue)	Tormé, Wells	4:33
4.	"If I Should Lose You"	Ralph Rainger, Leo Robin	6:02
5.	"Back in Your Own Backyard"	Dave Dreyer, Al Jolson, Billy Rose	8:02
6.	"My One and Only Love"	Robert Mellin, Guy Wood	5:47
7.	"Count Every Star"	Bruno Coquatrix, Sammy Gallop	6:18
8.	"Cool Blues" (Bonus track on CD reissue)	Charlie Parker	7:42
9.	"Outer Space" (Bonus track on CD reissue)	Grant Green	8:40

- Recorded at Rudy Van Gelder Studio, Englewood Cliffs, NJ on March 1, 1962 except "Count Every Star", which was recorded at Rudy Van Gelder Studio on December 23, 1961.

== Personnel ==
- Grant Green – guitar
- Ike Quebec – tenor saxophone
- Sonny Clark – piano
- Sam Jones – bass
- Louis Hayes – drums
