= Robert MacGimsey =

American composer (1898–1979)

Robert Hunter MacGimsey (1898–1979) was an American composer. His most famous song was "Sweet Little Jesus Boy" (1934), a well-known Christmas carol written in the style of an African-American spiritual.

== Early life ==
Robert Hunter MacGimsey was born in Pineville, Louisiana to white parents. He is one of six children and his father was a Professor of Mathematics. MacGimsey spent most of his formative years in the company of African-Americans who lived with, and worked for and with his family. Due to their influence he wrote in an "African American" style. He was often mistakenly assumed to be a black composer.

MacGimsey was a whistler as a boy, teaching himself at age 5. His mother, a church choir teacher, taught him singing, violin, and the piano soon after. MacGimsey sang in the church choir that his mother directed. She ensured that he received training in music, eventually studying under Frank Damrosch at the Institute of Musical Art in New York.

=== Law and politics ===
Before he became known for his musical accomplishments, MacGimsey was an attorney in Lake Providence, Louisiana, in addition to being an adviser to United States Senator Joseph E. Ransdell from Louisiana. In 1960, MacGimsey said that he was giving up music to dedicate the remainder of his life to good government.

=== Composing ===
MacGimsey is also known for the song "How Do You Do?" which was originally written for the Walt Disney live-action musical drama Song of the South. The song is also featured in the theme-park attraction Splash Mountain located in Disneyland, Walt Disney World, and Tokyo Disneyland. MacGimsey also composed "Shadrack," which was a 1962 hit for Brook Benton that was also recorded by Louis Armstrong and many others. In 1947, Robert Merrill recorded a disc (Victor 10-1303) with MacGimsey's songs ("Sweet Little Jesus Boy" and "To My Mother") on both sides.

MacGimsey worked with singer John Gary, beginning with their first meeting after Gary had left the Marines. Gary made a demonstration record with four new songs by MacGimsey, and a friendship developed thereafter. MacGimsey was also famous for double whistling, or whistling duets.

== Legacy ==
MacGimsey's library, letters and works can be found in the library archives at Louisiana College, Pineville, Louisiana.
