= Billy Durkin =

English footballer

Personal information
- Date of birth: 29 September 1921
- Place of birth: Bradford, England
- Date of death: August 2000 (aged 78)
- Place of death: Dorset, England
- Position: Inside forward

Senior career*
Years	Team	Apps	(Gls)
1946–1948	Bradford City	28	(1)
1948–1949	Rotherham United	2	(0)
1949–1954	Aldershot	129	(17)
- Weymouth
Total		159	(18)
- * Club domestic league appearances and goals

Billy Durkin (29 September 1921 – August 2000) was an English professional footballer who played as an inside forward.

== Career ==
Born in Bradford, Durkin played for Bradford City, Rotherham United, Aldershot and Weymouth.

He died in Dorset in August 2000.
