= Gibson ES-330 =

Electric Spanish thinline guitar by Gibson

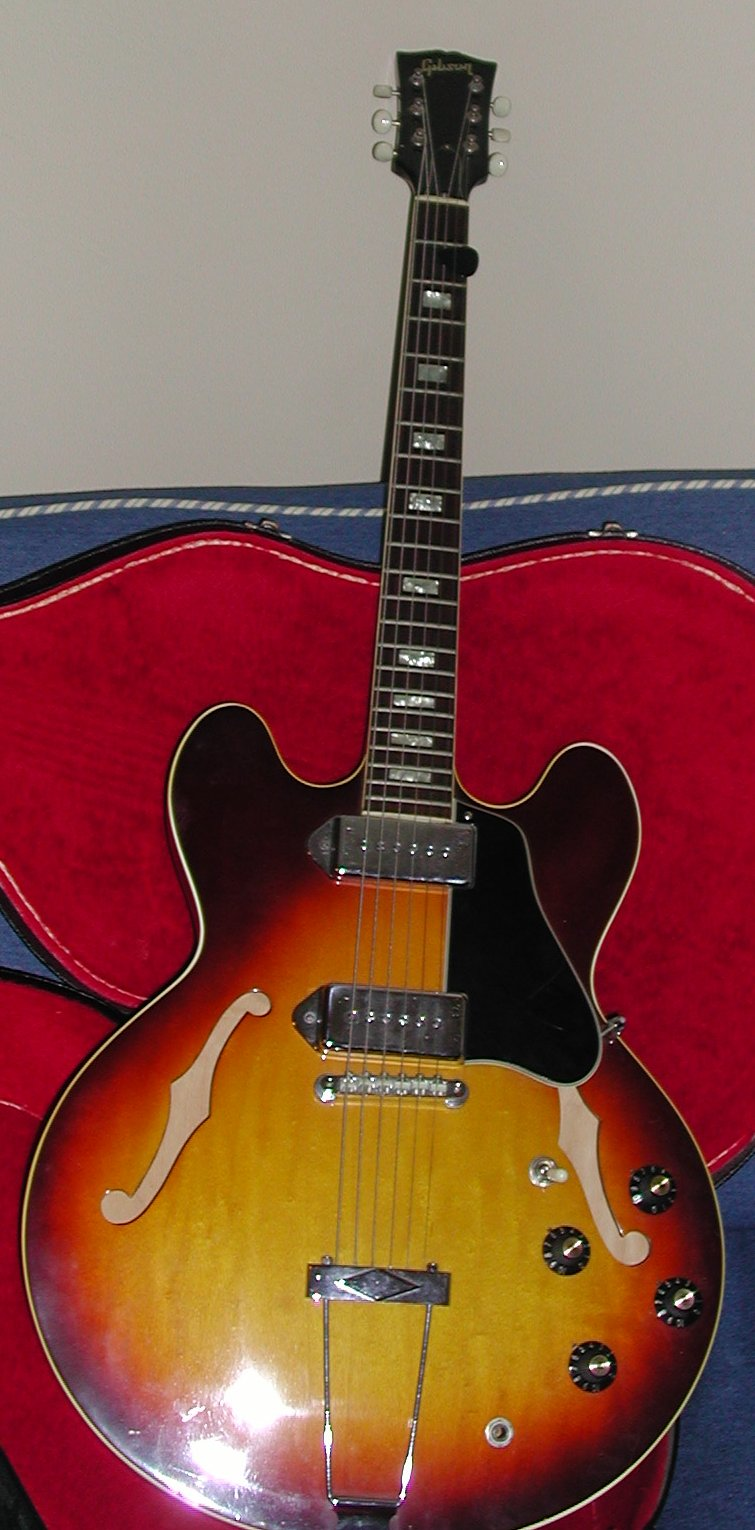
- Manufacturer: Gibson
- Period: 1959–1972

Construction
- Body type: hollow
- Neck joint: Set
- Scale: 24.75"

Woods
- Body: maple (laminated)
- Neck: mahogany on most models in most periods; sometimes maple
- Fretboard: rosewood

Hardware
- Bridge: Fixed
- Pickup: 1 or 2 P-90s

Colors available
- Sunburst, Cherry, Black, Natural

The Gibson ES-330 is a thinline hollow-body electric guitar model produced by the Gibson Guitar Corporation. It was first introduced in 1959, and had the same dimensions as the ES-335.

== History ==
Sales of Gibson’s Electric Spanish (ES) series guitars (ES-100 through ES-350) in the 1930s and 1940s encouraged the company to continue to produce more electric guitars. In 1955, Gibson released the ES-225T and the Gibson ES-350T thinline models. In 1958, Gibson released a new model, the ES-335, featuring a double-cutaway body. The ES-330 was released in 1959, for a retail price of $275. The 330 was offered as a one P-90 pickup model called the ES-330T, and a two pickup model called the ES-330TD.

== Specifications ==
The 330 had a maple top, back and sides, with two F Holes in the top. The body was 19 in (48 cm) long, 16 in (41 cm) wide and 1.75 in (4.4 cm) deep. Initially the neck met the body at the 16th fret, rather than the 19th-fret as on the ES-335. In 1968 Gibson changed the 330 neck to meet the body at the 19th fret. The 330 was hollow, whereas the 335 had a center block to prevent feedback. The 330 had P-90 pickups, while the 335 had humbuckers. The 330 had a mahogany neck with dot inlays and a 22-fret Brazilian Rosewood fretboard. The guitar also had a nickel-plated trapeze-style tailpiece. It was released in cherry, sunburst and natural finishes. In 1970 a walnut finish was added.

== Reception ==
The guitar was prone to feedback because of its hollow design. By the time it was released in 1959, the trend was for loud music, which did not favor the 330. The model was discontinued in 1972.

== See also ==
- Epiphone Casino
