= Grant Green =

American jazz guitarist and composer (1935–1979)

- Green at the Van Gelder Studio, 1962; by Francis Wolff

Background information
- Born: June 6, 1935; St. Louis, Missouri, U.S.
- Died: January 31, 1979 (aged 43) New York City, U.S.
- Genres: Jazz; bebop; hard bop; soul jazz; jazz-funk
- Occupations: Musician; composer
- Instrument: Guitar
- Works: Discography
- Years active: 1959–1978
- Labels: Blue Note; Verve; Kudu

Grant Green (June 6, 1935 – January 31, 1979) was an American jazz guitarist and composer.

Green has been called one of the "most sampled guitarists."

== Biography ==
Grant Green was born on June 6, 1935, in St. Louis, Missouri, United States, to John and Martha Green. At various times, his father was a laborer and a Saint Louis policeman. Grant began studying guitar while he was in primary school. He received early instruction in guitar playing from his father, who played blues and folk music. Grant studied for a year with Forrest Alcorn, but he was mostly self-taught, learning from listening to records.

Green first performed in a professional setting at the age of 13 as a member of a gospel music ensemble. Through his 20s, he was a member of jazz and R&B bands. His influences were Charlie Christian, Charlie Parker, Lester Young, and Jimmy Raney. Green's style mimicked that of a saxophonist, playing single notes rather than chords. His first recordings were at the age of 24, in St. Louis with tenor saxophonist Jimmy Forrest for the United label, where Green played alongside drummer Elvin Jones. Green recorded with Jones for several albums in the mid-1960s. In 1959, Lou Donaldson discovered Green playing at a bar in St. Louis (the Tick Tock or the Pink Elephant) and hired him for his touring band. Green moved to New York City during 1959–60.

Donaldson introduced Green to Alfred Lion of Blue Note Records. From 1961–1965, he was Blue Note's house guitarist. Rather than using Green as a sideman, as was the Blue Note practice, Lion arranged for him to record as a group leader. However, due to Green's lack of confidence, the initial recording session was not released until 2001 as First Session.

Despite his first session being shelved, Green's recording relationship with Blue Note lasted, with a few exceptions, throughout the 1960s. From 1961 to 1965, Green made more appearances on Blue Note albums as leader or sideman than anyone else. His first album as a leader was Grant's First Stand followed in the same year by Green Street and Grantstand. He was named Best New Star in the DownBeat Critics' Poll in 1962. He often provided support to others musicians on Blue Note, including saxophonists Hank Mobley, Ike Quebec, Stanley Turrentine, and organist Larry Young.

Sunday Mornin', The Latin Bit, and Feelin' the Spirit are all concept albums, each taking a musical theme or style: gospel, Latin, and spirituals, respectively. Grant carried off his more commercial dates with artistic success during this period: Idle Moments (1963), featuring Joe Henderson and Bobby Hutcherson, and Solid (1964) are described by jazz critics as two of Green's best recordings.

Many of Green's recordings were not released during his lifetime. These include several albums with pianist Sonny Clark recorded in 1961–1962 included in The Complete Grant Green & Sonny Clark released by Mosaic in 1997, and two albums from 1964 (Matador and Solid) that featured McCoy Tyner and Elvin Jones from the John Coltrane Quartet. In 1966, Green left Blue Note and recorded for other labels, including Verve. From 1967 to 1969, he was inactive due to personal problems and the effects of heroin addiction. In 1969, he returned to Blue Note but played mostly in R&B settings. His recordings from that period include the commercially successful Green Is Beautiful and the soundtrack to the 1972 film The Final Comedown.

For most of 1978, Green was in the hospital, and against the advice of doctors, went back on the road to earn money. While in New York City to play an engagement at George Benson's Breezin' Lounge, he collapsed in his car after a heart attack and died on January 31, 1979. He was buried in Greenwood Cemetery in his hometown of St. Louis and was survived by six children, including his son Grant Green Jr., who is also a guitarist. In 2017, the Killer Blues Headstone Project placed a headstone for Grant Green.

== Artistry and equipment ==
Recording prolifically for Blue Note Records as both leader and sideman, Green performed in the hard bop, soul jazz, bebop, and Latin-tinged idioms throughout his career. Critic Michael Erlewine wrote, "A severely underrated player during his lifetime, Grant Green is one of the great unsung heroes of jazz guitar ... Green's playing is immediately recognizable – perhaps more than any other guitarist." Critic Dave Hunter described his sound as "lithe, loose, slightly bluesy and righteously groovy". The simplicity and immediacy of Green's playing, which tended to avoid chromaticism, derived from his early work playing rhythm and blues and, although he achieved a synthesis of this style with bop, he was a skilled blues and funk guitarist and returned to this style in his later career. According to jazz educator Wolf Marshall, "Grant Green's unique mixture of bebop, blues and funk distinguished him as one of the quintessential soul jazz/hard bop guitarists from the get-go."

He often performed in an organ trio, a small group featuring a Hammond organ and drummer. Apart from fellow guitarist Charlie Christian, Green's primary influences were saxophonists, particularly Charlie Parker, and his approach was almost exclusively melodic rather than chordal.

Green used a Gibson ES-330, then a Gibson L7 with a Gibson McCarty pickguard/pickup, an Epiphone Emperor (with the same pickup), and finally had a custom-built D'Aquisto. According to his protégé and fellow guitarist George Benson, Green achieved his tone by turning down the bass and treble settings of his amplifier to maximize the midrange. That way he could get his signature punchy, biting tone.
