= Hank Mobley discography =

American jazz musician discography

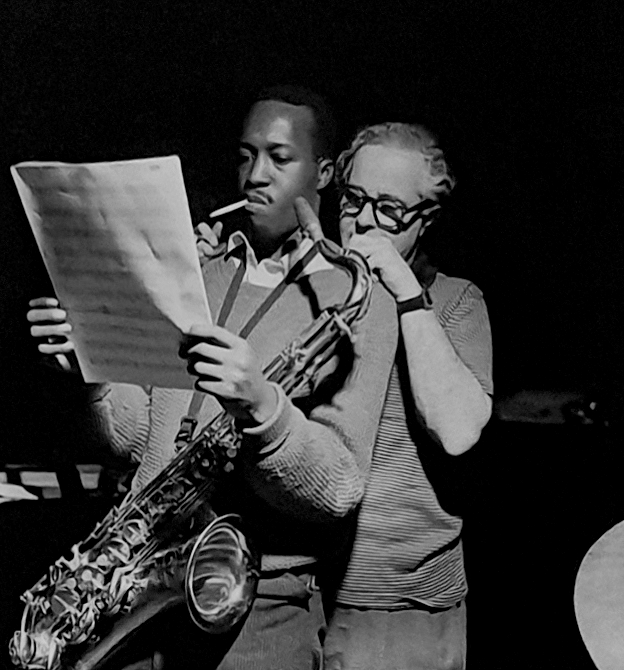
- Mobley and Alfred Lion, 1960
- Studio albums: 30
- Live albums: 3
- Compilation albums: 2

This article presents the discography of the American jazz saxophonist and composer Hank Mobley (1930–1986).

== As leader/co-leader ==
| Year released | Label | Catalog number | Title | Recording date | Credited to | Notes |
|---|---|---|---|---|---|---|
| 1955 | Blue Note | BLP 5066 | Hank Mobley Quartet | 1955-03-27 | | 10" |
| 1956 | Savoy | | The Jazz Message of Hank Mobley | 1956-01, 1956-02 | | |
| 1957 | Prestige | | Mobley's Message | 1956-07 | | |
| 1957 | Prestige | | Mobley's 2nd Message | 1956-07 | | |
| 1957 | Savoy | | Jazz Message No. 2 | 1956-07, 1956-11 | | |
| 1957 | Blue Note | BLP 1540 | Hank Mobley with Donald Byrd and Lee Morgan | 1956-11-25 | Hank Mobley Sextet | AKA Hank Mobley Sextet |
| 1957 | Blue Note | BLP 1544 | Hank Mobley and His All Stars | 1957-01-13 | | |
| 1957 | Blue Note | BLP 1550 | Hank Mobley with Farmer, Silver, Watkins, Blakey | 1957-03-08 | Hank Mobley Quintet | AKA Hank Mobley Quintet |
| 1957 | Blue Note | BLP 1560 | Hank | 1957-04-21 | Hank Mobley Sextet | |
| 1958 | Blue Note | BLP 1568 | Hank Mobley | 1957-06-23 | | |
| 1959 | Blue Note | BLP 1574 | Peckin' Time | 1958-02 | Hank Mobley–Lee Morgan | |
| 1960 | Blue Note | BLP 4031 | Soul Station | 1960-02-07 | | |
| 1961 | Blue Note | BLP 4058 | Roll Call | 1960-11 | | |
| 1962 | Blue Note | BLP 4080 | Workout | 1961-03 | | |
| 1964 | Blue Note | BLP 4149 | No Room for Squares | 1963-03, 1963-10 | | |
| 1965 | Blue Note | BLP 4186 | The Turnaround! | 1963-03, 1965-02 | | |
| 1966 | Blue Note | BLP 4209 | Dippin' | 1965-06 | | |
| 1967 | Blue Note | BLP 4230 | A Caddy for Daddy | 1965-12 | | |
| 1968 | Blue Note | BST 84273 | Hi Voltage | 1967-10 | | |
| 1968 | Blue Note | BST 84288 | Reach Out! | 1968-01 | | |
| 1970 | Blue Note | BST 84329 | The Flip | 1969-01 | | |
| 1972 | Muse | | Breakthrough! | 1972-02 | with Cedar Walton | |
| 1979 | Blue Note | 995 | A Slice of the Top | 1963-10, 1965-02, 1966-06 | | (2001)[CD] version includes rec. 1963-03 |
| 1980 | Blue Note | 1045 | Thinking of Home | 1970-07 | | |
| 1980 | Blue Note | 1081 | Third Season | 1967-02 | | LT series |
| 1980 | Blue Note | 1620 | Poppin' | 1957-10 | | |
| 1984 | Blue Note | 1611 | Curtain Call | 1957-08 | Hank Mobley / Sonny Clark | |
| 1984 | Blue Note | BST 84425 | Far Away Lands | 1967-05 | | |
| 1985 | Blue Note | BST 84431 | Another Workout | 1961-03, 1961-12 | | |
| 1986 | Blue Note | BST 84435 | Straight No Filter | 1963-10, 1965-02, 1965-02 | | (2000)[CD] version includes rec. 1963-03 |

=== Live albums ===
| Year released | Label | Title | Recording date | Co-leaders | Notes |
|---|---|---|---|---|---|
| 1958 | Roulette | Monday Night at Birdland | 1958-04 | with Curtis Fuller, Lee Morgan and Billy Root | |
| 1959 | Roulette | Another Monday Night at Birdland | 1958-04 | with Curtis Fuller, Lee Morgan and Billy Root | |
| 2012 | Uptown | Newark 1953 | 1953-09 | | |

=== Compilations ===
- The Complete Blue Note Hank Mobley Fifties Sessions (Mosaic, 1998) – rec. 1955–58
- The Feelin's Good (Blue Note, 2013) – rec. 1963

== As sideman ==
=== With Art Blakey's Jazz Messengers ===
- At the Cafe Bohemia, Vol. 1 (Blue Note, 1956) – rec. 1955
- At the Cafe Bohemia, Vol. 2 (Blue Note, 1956) – rec. 1955
- The Jazz Messengers (Columbia, 1956)
- Originally (Columbia, 1982) – rec. 1956
- Just Coolin' (Blue Note, 2020) – rec. 1959
- At the Jazz Corner of the World (Blue Note, 1959)

=== With Kenny Burrell ===
- All Night Long (Prestige, 1957) – rec. 1956
- K. B. Blues (Blue Note, 1979) – rec. 1957

=== With Donald Byrd ===
- Byrd's Eye View (Transition, 1955)
- Byrd in Flight (Blue Note, 1960)
- A New Perspective (Blue Note, 1963)
- Mustang! (Blue Note, 1966)
- Blackjack (Blue Note, 1967)

=== With Sonny Clark ===
- Dial "S" for Sonny (Blue Note, 1957)
- My Conception (Blue Note, 1959)

=== With Miles Davis ===
- Someday My Prince Will Come (Columbia, 1961)
- Miles Davis at Carnegie Hall (Columbia, 1962) – rec. 1961
- The Complete Blackhawk (Sony, 2003) – rec. 1961

=== With Kenny Dorham ===
- Afro-Cuban (Blue Note, 1957) – rec. 1955
- Whistle Stop (Blue Note, 1961)

=== With Kenny Drew ===
- This Is New (Riverside, 1957)
- Undercurrent (Blue Note, 1961) – rec. 1960

=== With Curtis Fuller ===
- The Opener (Blue Note, 1957)
- Sliding Easy (United Artists, 1959)

=== With Dizzy Gillespie ===
- Afro (Norgran, 1954)
- Diz and Getz (Verve, 1955) – rec. 1953
- Dizzy and Strings (Norgran, 1955) – rec. 1954
- Jazz Recital (Norgran, 1956) – rec. 1954–55

=== With Freddie Hubbard ===
- Goin' Up (Blue Note, 1961) – rec. 1960
- Blue Spirits (Blue Note, 1967) – rec. 1965–66

=== With Elvin Jones ===
- Together! (Atlantic, 1961) also with Philly Joe Jones
- Midnight Walk (Atlantic, 1966)

=== With Lee Morgan ===
- Introducing Lee Morgan (Savoy, 1956)
- Lee Morgan Sextet (Blue Note, 1957) – rec. 1956
- Cornbread (Blue Note, 1967) – rec. 1965
- Charisma (Blue Note, 1969) – rec. 1966
- The Rajah (Blue Note, 1985) – rec. 1966

=== With Max Roach ===
- The Max Roach Quartet featuring Hank Mobley (Debut, 1954) – rec. 1953
- MAX (Argo, 1958)
- The Max Roach 4 Plays Charlie Parker (EmArcy, 1959) – rec. 1957–58

=== With Archie Shepp ===
- Yasmina, a Black Woman (BYG Actuel, 1969)
- Poem for Malcolm (BYG, 1969)

=== With Horace Silver ===
- Horace Silver and the Jazz Messengers (Blue Note, 1956) – rec. 1954–55
- Silver's Blue (Epic, 1957) – rec. 1956
- 6 Pieces of Silver (Blue Note, 1957) – rec. 1956
- The Stylings of Silver (Blue Note, 1957)

=== With Jimmy Smith ===
- A Date with Jimmy Smith Volume One (Blue Note, 1957)
- A Date with Jimmy Smith Volume Two (Blue Note, 1957)

=== With others ===
- John Coltrane, Zoot Sims & Al Cohn, Tenor Conclave (Prestige, 1957) – rec. 1956
- Art Farmer, Farmer's Market (New Jazz, 1958) – rec. 1956
- Grant Green, I Want to Hold Your Hand (Blue Note, 1966) – rec. 1965
- Johnny Griffin, A Blowin' Session (Blue Note, 1957)
- Herbie Hancock, My Point of View (Blue Note, 1963)
- Elmo Hope, Informal Jazz (Prestige, 1956)
- J. J. Johnson, The Eminent Jay Jay Johnson Volume 2 (Blue Note, 1954)[10"]
- Wynton Kelly, Interpretations (Vee-Jay, 1977)
- Jackie McLean, 4, 5 and 6 (Prestige, 1956)
- Tete Montoliu, I Wanna Talk About You (SteepleChase, 1980)
- Dizzy Reece, Star Bright (Blue Note, 1959)
- Rita Reys, The Cool Voice of Rita Reys (Colombia, 1956) – rec. 1955–56
- Freddie Roach, Good Move! (Blue Note, 1963)
- Doug Watkins, Watkins at Large (Transition, 1956)
- Julius Watkins, Julius Watkins Sextet (Blue Note, 1995) – rec. 1954–55
