= 1950s in jazz =

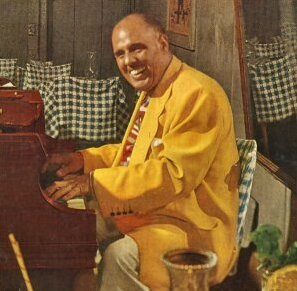
Fats Pichon on an LP cover in the 1950s

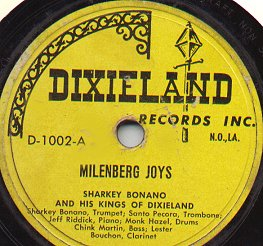
Dixieland Records 78

By the end of the 1940s, the nervous energy and tension of bebop was replaced with a tendency towards calm and smoothness, with the sounds of cool jazz, which favoured long, linear melodic lines. It emerged in New York City, as a result of the mixture of the styles of predominantly white swing jazz musicians and predominantly black bebop musicians, and it dominated jazz in the first half of the 1950s. The starting point were a series of singles on Capitol Records in 1949 and 1950 of a nonet led by trumpeter Miles Davis, collected and released first on a ten-inch and later on a twelve-inch as the Birth of the Cool. Cool jazz recordings by Chet Baker, Dave Brubeck, Bill Evans, Gil Evans, Stan Getz and the Modern Jazz Quartet usually have a "lighter" sound which avoided the aggressive tempos and harmonic abstraction of bebop. Cool jazz later became strongly identified with the West Coast jazz scene, but also had a particular resonance in Europe, especially Scandinavia, with emergence of such major figures as baritone saxophonist Lars Gullin and pianist Bengt Hallberg. The theoretical underpinnings of cool jazz were set out by the blind Chicago pianist Lennie Tristano, and its influence stretches into such later developments as Bossa nova, modal jazz, and even free jazz. See also the list of cool jazz and West Coast musicians for further detail.

Hard bop, an extension of bebop (or "bop") music that incorporates influences from rhythm and blues, gospel music, and blues, especially in the saxophone and piano playing, developed in the mid-1950s, partly in response to the vogue for cool jazz in the early 1950s. The hard bop style coalesced in 1953 and 1954, paralleling the rise of rhythm and blues. Miles Davis' performance of "Walkin'" the title track of his album of the same year, at the first Newport Jazz Festival in 1954, announced the style to the jazz world. The quintet Art Blakey and the Jazz Messengers, fronted by Blakey and featuring pianist Horace Silver and trumpeter Clifford Brown, were leaders in the hard bop movement along with Davis. (See also List of Hard bop musicians)

Modal jazz recordings, such as Miles Davis's Kind of Blue, became popular in the late 1950s. Popular modal standards include Davis's "All Blues" and "So What" (both 1959), John Coltrane's "Impressions" (1963) and Herbie Hancock's "Maiden Voyage" (1965). Later, Davis's "second great quintet", which included saxophonist Wayne Shorter and pianist Herbie Hancock, recorded a series of highly acclaimed albums in the mid-to-late 1960s. Standards from these sessions include Shorter's "Footprints" (1966) and Eddie Harris's "Freedom Jazz Dance" (1966).

In Brazil, a new style of music called bossa nova evolved in the late 1950s. The free jazz movement, coming to prominence in the late 1950s, spawned very few standards. Free jazz's unorthodox structures and performance techniques are not as amenable to transcription as other jazz styles. However, "Lonely Woman" (1959) a blues by saxophonist Ornette Coleman, is perhaps the closest thing to a standard in free jazz, having been recorded by dozens of notable performers.

== 1950s jazz standards ==
=== 1950–1954 ===
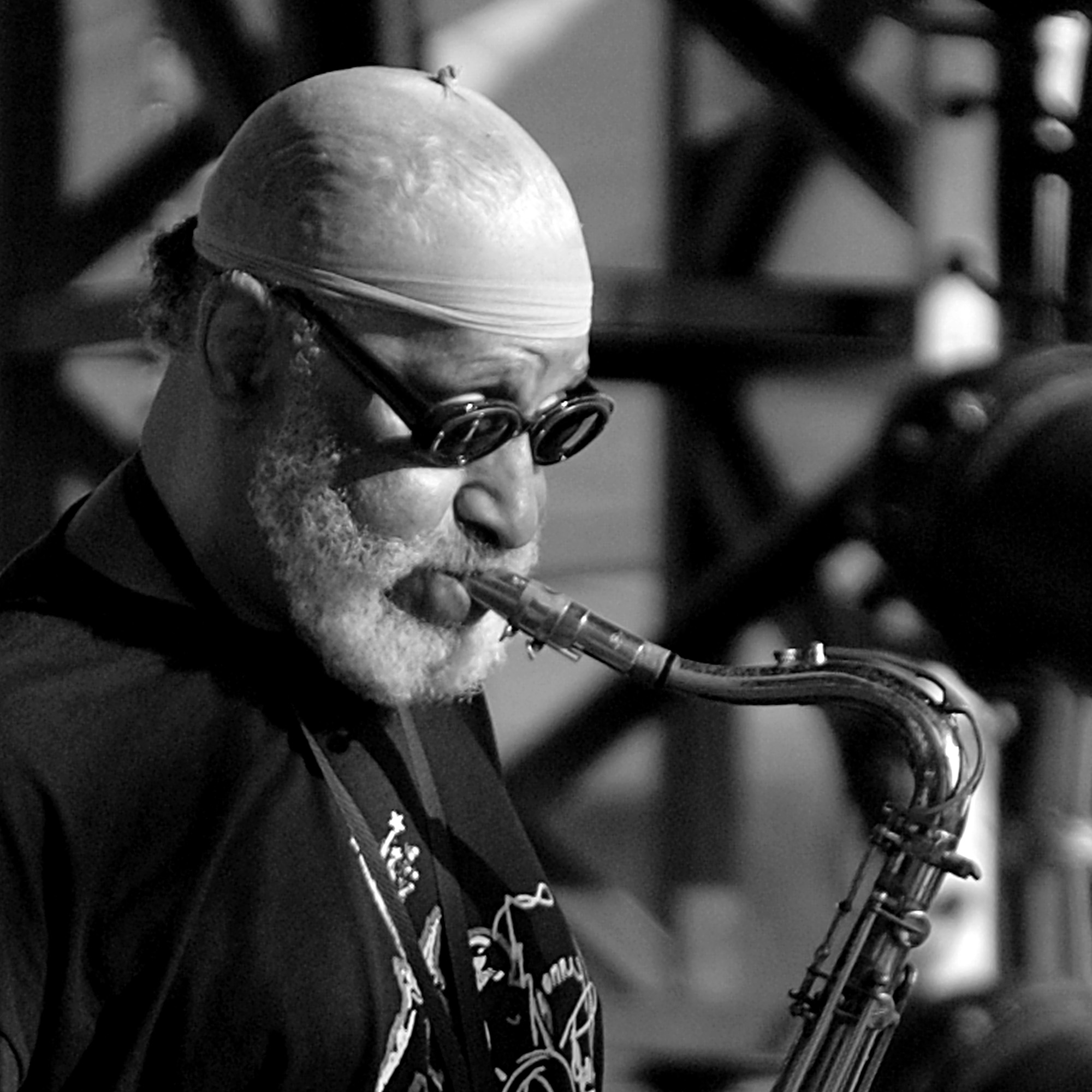
Sonny Rollins played in Thelonious Monk's and Miles Davis's bands in the 1950s before starting a successful solo career. With Davis, he composed the standards "Airegin", "Doxy" and "Oleo".

- 1950 – "If I Were a Bell". Written by Frank Loesser.
- 1951 – "Au Privave". – Bebop composition by Charlie Parker.
- 1951 – "Night Train" Composed by Jimmy Forrest, Lewis P. Simpkins and Oscar Washington.
- 1951 – "Straight, No Chaser". Composed by Thelonious Monk
- 1952 – "Lullaby of Birdland". Composed by George Shearing with lyrics by George David Weiss.
- 1952 – "My One and Only Love" Composed by Guy Wood with lyrics by Robert Mellin.
- 1952 – "That's All". Written by Bob Haymes and Alan Brandt.
- 1952 – "When I Fall in Love". Composed by Victor Young with lyrics by Edward Heyman.
- 1953 – "Here's That Rainy Day". Composed by Jimmy Van Heusen with lyrics by Johnny Burke.
- 1953 – "Jordu". Composed by Duke Jordan.
- 1953 – "Satin Doll". Composed by Duke Ellington and Billy Strayhorn with lyrics by Johnny Mercer.
- 1954 – "Airegin". Composed by Sonny Rollins.
- 1954 – "All of You". Written by Cole Porter.
- 1954 – "Blue Monk". Composed by Thelonious Monk.
- 1954 – "Django". Composed by John Lewis.
- 1954 – "Doxy". Composed by Sonny Rollins.
- 1954 – "Fly Me to the Moon" (a.k.a. "In Other Words"). Written by Bart Howard.
- 1954 – "Joy Spring". Composed by Clifford Brown with lyrics by Jon Hendricks.
- 1954 – "Misty". Composed by Erroll Garner with lyrics by Johnny Burke.
- 1954 – "Oleo". Composed by Sonny Rollins.
- 1954 – "Solar". Composed by Miles Davis.

=== 1955–1959 ===
- 1956 – "Blues for Alice". Composed by Charlie Parker.
- 1956 – "Canadian Sunset". Composed by Eddie Heywood with lyrics by Norman Gimbel.
- 1956 – "Con Alma". Composed by Dizzy Gillespie.
- 1956 – "Nica's Dream". Composed by Horace Silver.
- 1956 – "Waltz for Debby". Composed by Bill Evans with lyrics by Gene Lees.
- 1957 – "I Remember Clifford". Composed by Benny Golson with lyrics by Jon Hendricks.
- 1958 – "Bags' Groove". Composed by Milt Jackson.
- 1958 – "Blue Train". – Jazz blues composition by John Coltrane from his album Blue Train.
- 1958 – "Chega de Saudade" (a.k.a. "No More Blues"). Composed by Antonio Carlos Jobim with lyrics by Vinicius de Moraes (Portuguese) and Jon Hendricks and Jessie Cavanaugh (English).
- 1958 – "Milestones". Composed by Miles Davis.
- 1959 – "Afro Blue". Composed by Mongo Santamaría.
- 1959 – "All Blues". Composed by Miles Davis.
- 1959 – "The Best Is Yet to Come". Composed by Cy Coleman with lyrics by Carolyn Leigh.
- 1959 – "Blue in Green". – Modal jazz composition from Miles Davis's album Kind of Blue. Credited solely to Davis on Kind of Blue and to Davis and Bill Evans on Evans's Portrait in Jazz, the song's authorship is disputed; Evans and Earl Zindars claim that Evans alone composed the tune.
- 1959 – "Desafinado" (a.k.a. "Slightly Out of Tune", also "Off Key"). Composed by Antonio Carlos Jobim with lyrics by Newton Mendonça (Portuguese), and Jon Hendricks and Jessie Cavanaugh (English).
- 1959 – "Freddie Freeloader". Composed by Miles Davis.
- 1959 – "Giant Steps". Composed by John Coltrane.
- 1959 – "Goodbye Pork Pie Hat". Composed by Charles Mingus.
- 1959 – "Goodbye Tristesse" (a.k.a. "A Felicidade"). Composed by Antonio Carlos Jobim with lyrics by Vinicius de Moraes (Portuguese) and Hal Shaper (English).
- 1959 – "Killer Joe". Composed by Benny Golson.
- 1959 – "Manhã de Carnaval" (a.k.a. "A Day in the Life of a Fool", also "Black Orpheus"). Written by Luiz Bonfá and Antônio Maria with English lyrics by Carl Sigman.
- 1959 – "Mr. P.C.". Composed by John Coltrane.
- 1959 – "My Favorite Things". Composed by Richard Rodgers with lyrics by Oscar Hammerstein II.
- 1959 – "Naima" (a.k.a. "Niema"). Composed by John Coltrane.
- 1959 – "Nostalgia in Times Square". Written by Charles Mingus.
- 1959 – "Sidewinder". Composed by Lee Morgan.
- 1959 – "So What". Composed by Miles Davis.
- 1959 – "Take Five". Composed by Paul Desmond.

== 1950 ==
=== Album releases ===
- Miles Davis: Birth of the Cool
- Stan Kenton: Presents
- Ralph Sutton: Ralph Sutton
- Lennie Tristano: Wow
- Stan Getz: Quartets

=== Deaths ===
- Fats Navarro (September 24, 1923 – July 7)

== 1951 ==
=== Album releases ===
- Stan Kenton: City of Glass
- Oscar Peterson: 1951
- Shorty Rogers: Modern Sounds

== 1952 ==
=== Album releases ===
- Gerry Mulligan: Mulligan Quartet
- Johnny Smith: Moonlight in Vermont

=== Deaths ===
- Midge Williams (May 27, 1915 – January 9)
- John Kirby (December 31, 1908 – June 14)
- Fletcher Henderson (December 18, 1897 – December 28)

== 1953 ==
=== Album releases ===
- Duke Ellington: Piano Reflections
- Ben Webster: King of the Tenors
- Shorty Rogers: Cool and Crazy
- Jay Jay Johnson: Four Trombones

=== Deaths ===
- Django Reinhardt (January 23, 1910 – May 16)

== 1954 ==
=== Album releases ===
- Frank Sinatra: Songs for Young Lovers
- Sarah Vaughan: Sarah Vaughan
- Chet Baker: Sextet
- Tal Farlow: The Tal Farlow Quartet
- Tal Farlow: The Tal Farlow Album
- John Serry Sr.: RCA Thesaurus featuring John Serry & his ensemble The Bel-cordions

=== Births ===
- Donald Brown (March 28), pianist
- Al Di Meola (July 22), guitarist.

== 1955 ==
=== Album releases ===
- Herbie Nichols: The Third World
- Ahmad Jamal: Poinciana
- Erroll Garner: Concert by the Sea
- George Shearing: Spell
- Horace Silver: Horace Silver and the Jazz Messengers
- Lennie Tristano: Lennie Tristano
- Oscar Peterson: Al Zardis
- Frank Morgan: Frank Morgan
- Herbie Nichols: Herbie Nichols Trio

=== Deaths ===
- Charlie Parker (August 29, 1920 – March 12), saxophonist
- James P. Johnson (February 1, 1894 – November 17), stride pianist
- Wardell Gray (February 13, 1921 – May 25), saxophonist

== 1956 ==
=== Album releases ===
- Charles Mingus: Pithecanthropus Erectus
- Modern Jazz Quartet: Django
- Modern Jazz Quartet: Fontessa
- Thelonious Monk: Brilliant Corners
- Sonny Rollins: Saxophone Colossus
- George Russell:The Jazz Workshop
- Lennie Tristano: Manhattan Studio/ New York Improvisations
- Max Roach: Max Roach + 4
- John Lewis: Grand Encounter
- Horace Silver: Six Pieces of Silver
- Kenny Burrell: All Night Long
- Lucky Thompson: Tricotism
- Phineas Newborn: Piano Artistry
- Miles Davis: Round About Midnight
- Zoot Sims: Tonite's Music Today
- Mel Torme: Touch
- Quincy Jones: This Is How I Feel About Jazz
- Stan Kenton: Cuban Fire
- Jimmy Giuffre: The Jimmy Giuffre Clarinet
- Jimmy Smith: A New Star A New Sound
- Cecil Taylor: Jazz Advance
- John Serry Sr.: Squeeze Play featuring The Bel-cordions

=== Deaths ===
- Clifford Brown (October 30, 1930 – June 26)
- Richie Powell (September 5, 1931 – June 26)
- Art Tatum (October 13, 1909 – November 5)
- Tommy Dorsey (November 19, 1905 – November 26)

=== Births ===
- Wayne Krantz (July 26)
- Wolfgang Puschnig (May 21)

== 1957 ==
=== Album releases ===
- Miles Davis: Birth of the Cool
- Charles Mingus: Tijuana Moods
- Art Blakey: Orgy In Rhythm
- Yusef Lateef: Jazz Mood
- John Coltrane: Blue Train
- John Lewis: Piano
- Milt Jackson: Soul Brothers
- Miles Davis: Miles Ahead
- Kenny Burrell: All Day Long
- Ben Webster: Soulville
- Sonny Rollins: Way Out West
- Ben Webster: Tenor Giants
- Art Pepper: Meets the Rhythm Section
- Art Taylor: Wailers
- Max Roach: Jazz in 3/4 time
- Jay Jay Johnson: Blue Trombone
- Hank Mobley: Hank Mobley Quintet
- Herbie Mann: Flute Souffle
- Tito Puente: Top Percussion

=== Deaths ===
- Sonny Parker (May 5, 1925 – February 7), singer-dancer-drummer
- Joe Shulman (September 12, 1923 – August 2), bass
- Walter Page (February 9, 1900 – December 20), bass
- Jimmy Dorsey (February 25, 1904 – June 12), saxophone

=== Births ===
- George Letellier (October 11), American pianist and composer

== 1958 ==
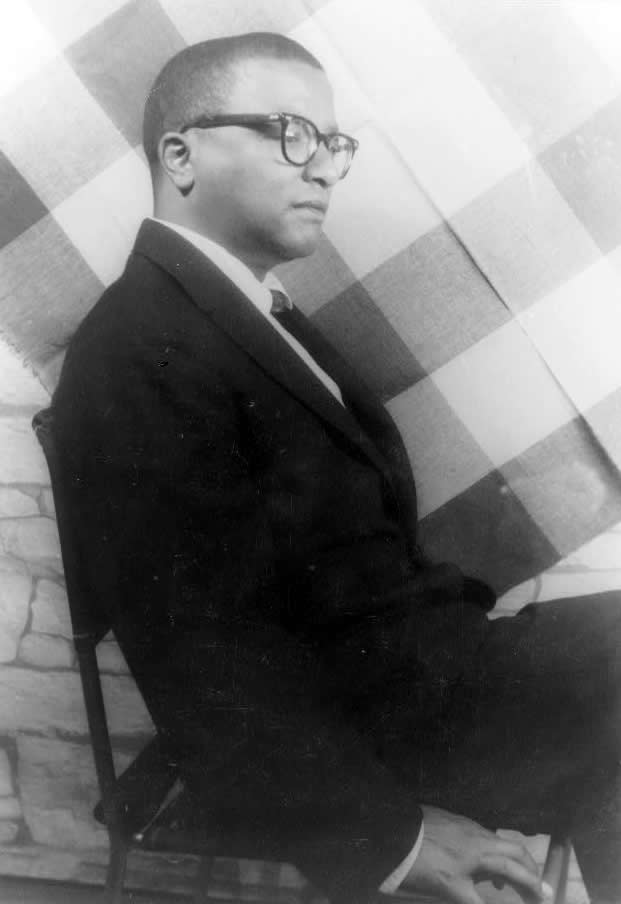
Jazz pianist Billy Strayhorn in 1958

=== Album releases ===
- Miles Davis: Milestones
- Sonny Rollins: Freedom Suite
- Dizzy Gillespie, Sonny Stitt, Sonny Rollins: Sonny Side Up
- Jimmy Giuffre: Western Suite
- Sun Ra: Jazz in Silhouette
- Art Blakey: Moanin'
- Cecil Taylor: Looking Ahead!
- Jimmy Smith: The Sermon!
- Blue Mitchell: Big Six
- Max Roach: Deeds, Not Words
- Clark Terry: In Orbit
- Cannonball Adderley: Somethin' Else
- Chico Hamilton: Gongs East
- Hank Mobley: Peckin' Time
- Mongo Santamaria: Yambu
- Cal Tjader: Latin Concert
- Toots Thielemans: Man Bites Harmonica!
- Thelonious Monk: Misterioso
- Jimmy Giuffre: The Four Brothers Sound
- John Serry Sr. Chicago Musette - John Serry et son Accordéon (in French)
- Billie Holiday: Lady in Satin

=== Deaths ===
- Tiny Bradshaw (September 23, 1905 – November 26)

=== Births ===
- Ulf Wakenius (April 16), Swedish guitarist

== 1959 ==
=== Events ===
- August 25: Between sets at Birdland in New York City, Miles Davis is beaten by police and jailed.

=== Album releases ===
- Dave Brubeck – Time Out (Columbia)
- Ornette Coleman – The Shape of Jazz to Come (Atlantic)
- John Coltrane – Giant Steps (Atlantic)
- Miles Davis – Kind of Blue (Columbia)
- Johnny Hodges and Duke Ellington – Back to Back: Duke Ellington and Johnny Hodges Play the Blues (Verve)
- Milt Jackson and John Coltrane – Bags & Trane (Atlantic)
- Charles Mingus – Mingus Ah Um (Columbia)
- Art Pepper – Art Pepper + Eleven – Modern Jazz Classics (Contemporary/OJC)
- Ella Fitzgerald – Ella Fitzgerald Sings the George and Ira Gershwin Songbook (Verve)

=== Deaths ===
- Lester Young (August 27, 1909 – March 15)
- Sidney Bechet (May 14, 1897 – May 14)
- Boris Vian (March 10, 1920 – June 23)
- Billie Holiday (April 7, 1915 – July 17)

=== Births ===
- Stanley Jordan (July 31), guitarist
- Marcus Miller (June 14), bassist and composer
- Torsten Zwingenberger (Januar12), German drummer

=== Awards ===
- Grammy Awards of 1959
  - Best Jazz Performance Solo or Small Group
  - Best Jazz Performance Large Group
  - Best Jazz Composition of More Than Five Minutes Duration

== Bibliography ==
- The New Real Book, Volume I. Sher Music. 1988. ISBN 0-9614701-4-3.
- The New Real Book, Volume II. Sher Music. 1991. ISBN 0-9614701-7-8.
- The New Real Book, Volume III. Sher Music. 1995. ISBN 1-883217-30-X.
- The Real Book, Volume I (6th ed.). Hal Leonard. 2004. ISBN 0-634-06038-4.
- The Real Book, Volume II (2nd ed.). Hal Leonard. 2007. ISBN 978-1-4234-2452-9.
- The Real Book, Volume III (2nd ed.). Hal Leonard. 2006. ISBN 0-634-06136-4.
- The Real Jazz Book. Warner Bros. ISBN 978-91-85041-36-7.
- The Real Vocal Book, Volume I. Hal Leonard. 2006. ISBN 0-634-06080-5.
