= The Feelin's Good =

Compilation album by Hank Mobley
- Released: 2013
- Recorded: March 7, 1963
- Studio: Van Gelder Studio, Englewood Cliffs, New Jersey
- Genre: Jazz
- Length: 42:12
- Label: Blue Note; ST 84401
- Producer: Alfred Lion

Hank Mobley chronology
No Room for Squares (1985)	The Feelin's Good (2013)	Straight No Filter (1963)

The Feelin's Good is a compilation album of tracks recorded by jazz tenor saxophonist Hank Mobley for Blue Note Records on March 7, 1963. It was released in 2013 on the Music Matters label. It features performances by Mobley, Donald Byrd, Herbie Hancock, Butch Warren and Philly Joe Jones.

The songs from the session were originally split up and released on several Blue Note albums, as follows: "Old World, New Imports" and "Up A Step", appeared on No Room for Squares (1964). "East Of The Village" and "The Good Life", appeared on The Turnaround! (1965). The remaining two tracks, "The Feelin's Good" and "Yes Indeed", were not released until 1985 as part of the compilation album Straight No Filter.

== Reception ==
Greg Simmons of All About Jazz praised the album as one of Mobley's best.

== Track listing ==
All compositions by Hank Mobley, except as noted

1. "The Feelin's Good"
2. "Up A Step"
3. "The Good Life" (Sacha Distel, Jack Reardon)
4. "East of the Village"
5. "Yes Indeed" (Sy Oliver)
6. "Old World, New Imports"

== Personnel ==
- Hank Mobley – tenor saxophone
- Donald Byrd – trumpet
- Herbie Hancock – piano
- Butch Warren – bass
- Philly Joe Jones – drums
