= Señor Blues (song) =

Composition by Horace Silver

from the album 6 Pieces of Silver
- Language: English
- Recorded: November 10, 1956; Hackensack, New Jersey, U.S.
- Genre: Jazz; hard bop
- Label: Blue Note
- Songwriter: Horace Silver
- Producer: Alfred Lion

"Señor Blues" is a composition by jazz pianist Horace Silver. The original version, an instrumental by Silver's quintet, was recorded on November 10, 1956. It has become a jazz standard. Silver later wrote lyrics, which were first recorded by Silver's band with Bill Henderson singing in 1958. Mark Murphy recorded another vocal version on his 1962 Riverside album That's How I Love the Blues!

== Composition ==
"'Señor Blues' is a 12/8 Latin piece with a dark, exotic flavor that recalls no other jazz composer as much as Duke Ellington. The first two chords are E♭ minor and B7, resembling (whether consciously intended or not) one of Ellington's favorite harmonic gestures." Silver stated that the words he wrote for "Señor Blues" were his first song lyrics.

== Original recording ==
The piece was first recorded on November 10, 1956, by the Horace Silver Quintet, comprising Silver (piano), Hank Mobley (tenor saxophone), Donald Byrd (trumpet), Doug Watkins (bass), and Louis Hayes (drums). Scott Yanow commented that "'Señor Blues' officially put Horace Silver on the map". It was released as part of the Blue Note Records album 6 Pieces of Silver. The track was a minor hit and was released as a 45-rpm single by Blue Note.

== Notable cover versions ==
In 1977, jazz trombonist Urbie Green recorded "Señor Blues" on his album of the same name, released that same year. Blues musician Taj Mahal also covered the song on his own Señor Blues album, released in 1997.
