= The Flip (album) =

Studio album by Hank Mobley
- Released: June 1970
- Recorded: July 12, 1969
- Studio: Studio Barclay, Paris
- Genre: Jazz
- Length: 37:38
- Label: Blue Note; BST 84329
- Producer: Francis Wolff

Hank Mobley chronology
Reach Out! (1968)	The Flip (1970)	Thinking of Home (1970)

The Flip is an album by the jazz saxophonist Hank Mobley recorded on July 12, 1969 in Paris, France, and released on the Blue Note label. It features performances by Mobley with four European-based musicians: trumpeter Dizzy Reece, trombonist Slide Hampton, pianist Vince Benedetti, bassist Alby Cullaz, and drummer Philly Joe Jones.

== Reception ==
Professional ratings
Review scores
Source	Rating
Allmusic	4/5 stars
DownBeat	3/5 stars
The Guardian	3/5 stars
The Penguin Guide to Jazz Recordings	3/4 stars

Allmusic awarded the album 4 stars with review by Thom Jurek saying, "While not as groundbreaking as A Caddy for Daddy, Dippin' or Soul Station, Flip is nonetheless a solid hard groove date for Mobley ... Flip is a very worthwhile side to add to the Mobley shelf".

The Guardian's John Fordham called it "Pretty standard Blue Note hard bop, but from an original who doesn't make an exhibition of how original he is" observing "The music has something of a Blue Note usual-suspects quality and Vince Benedetti's metronomic piano comping under the horns can get on your nerves, but the lineup is otherwise strong and the music pretty lively".

On All About Jazz Germien Linares stated "An exquisite soul messenger, Mobley was criticized for not being as aggressive, voluminous, or trailblazing as his contemporaries. Indeed, he was not. Instead, his music was steeped in care, precision and nuances. In Mobley's hands, such treatment often dazzled, as on his latest Blue Note reissue, The Flip ... He's supported by an excellent crew of international musicians, ... All the tunes on The Flip were composed by Mobley and are built around his strengths of soul, swing, and subtlety ... True, this album and its composer will never be within the ranks of the most influential, the most revered, or even the most downloaded. Fine. Besides, as a provocateur of beauty, Mobley is in a class all his own".

Flophouse magazine noted "In the late sixties Hank Mobley’s round tone had become a bit rougher around the edges and his style was more hard-driving. This is evident on 1969’s The Flip, which boasts hi-voltage blowing but is short on finesse. Mobley, always the prolific songwriter, wrote all five tunes on The Flip. The compositions that turn out best are the ones that resemble Mobley’s songwriting of the late fifties and early sixties. ... The Flip swings hard and is sure to enliven a party. But unfortunately, it also swings wild and uncontrolled, favouring a strained, hi-octane tension over a sophisticated build-up".

== Track listing ==
All compositions by Hank Mobley.

1. "The Flip" - 9:02
2. "Feelin' Folksy" - 8:29
3. "Snappin' Out" - 7:14
4. "18th Hole" - 6:00
5. "Early Morning Stroll" - 6:53

== Personnel ==
- Hank Mobley — tenor saxophone
- Dizzy Reece — trumpet
- Slide Hampton — trombone
- Vince Benedetti — piano
- Alby Cullaz — double bass
- Philly Joe Jones — drums
