= Third Season =

Third Season may refer to:

- Third Season (album), by Hank Mobley, 1967
- "Third Season", a song from the 1997 album Shut Your Mouth and Open Your Eyes by AFI
