= Monday Night at Birdland =

Live album by Hank Mobley, Curtis Fuller, Lee Morgan and Billy Root
- Released: November 1958
- Recorded: April 21, 1958
- Venue: Birdland, New York City
- Genre: Jazz
- Length: 46:00
- Label: Roulette; R/SR-52015
- Producer: Rudy Traylor

Hank Mobley chronology
Peckin' Time (1958)	Monday Night at Birdland (1958)	Another Monday Night at Birdland (1959)

Curtis Fuller chronology
Two Bones (1958)	Monday Night at Birdland (1958)	Another Monday Night at Birdland (1959)

Lee Morgan chronology
Peckin' Time (1958)	Monday Night at Birdland (1958)	Another Monday Night at Birdland (1959)

Monday Night at Birdland is a live album which was recorded at Birdland in 1958 by tenor saxophonists Hank Mobley and Billy Root, trombonists Kai Winding and Curtis Fuller, and trumpeter Lee Morgan. It was first released by the Roulette label. Symphony Sid wrote the liner notes.

== Reception ==
Professional ratings
Review scores
Source	Rating
AllMusic	3.5/5 stars
Billboard	4/4 stars

Billboard mentioned that Monday nights at Birdland were "when the regular bill is off and the young musicians get a chance to show their stuff". The reviewer concluded that the album was "A good jazz set."

John S. Wilson referred to Fuller's contributions as "positive evidence of outgoing vitality", Morgan's as "set[ting] a rip-roaring, challenging pace", and described the recording overall as "a really bright, swinging session".

AllMusic reviewer Michael G. Nastos wrote: "Birdland was the focal point of the scene, and Blue Note Records provided the recording studio forum for the rising stars of the music, especially a teenage trumpeter named Lee Morgan, fresh from Philadelphia and ready to take on the world ... Emerging from the new music, trombonist Curtis Fuller, tenor saxophonist Hank Mobley, and pianist Ray Bryant are the principals on this date, with lesser-known but equally potent tenor man Billy Root ... Where the value lies in this session is the developing sound provided by Mobley, while Billy Root is the missing link between peer tenor saxophonists from Philly and the emerging John Coltrane. These Monday night sessions -- originally issued on the Roulette label -- are interesting to listen to especially if you are a fan of any of these legendary musicians. Because of the loosely associated nature of thrown-together bands, it's not an essential item, but good to refer to for perspective".

== Track listing ==
1. Introduction by "Symphony Sid" – 0:09
2. "Walkin'" (Richard Carpenter) – 12:26
3. "All the Things You Are" (Jerome Kern, Oscar Hammerstein II) – 11:27
4. "Bags' Groove" (Milt Jackson) – 12:29
5. "There Will Never Be Another You" (Harry Warren, Mack Gordon) – 9:29

== Personnel ==
- Hank Mobley, Billy Root – tenor saxophone
- Lee Morgan – trumpet
- Curtis Fuller – trombone
- Ray Bryant – piano
- Tommy Bryant – bass
- Specs Wright – drums
