= The Turnaround! =

Studio album by Hank Mobley
- Released: July 1965
- Recorded: March 7, 1963 (#2–3, 9–10); February 4, 1965 (#1, 4–8)
- Studio: Van Gelder Studio, Englewood Cliffs, NJ
- Genre: Jazz
- Length: 40:30
- Label: Blue Note; BST 84186
- Producer: Alfred Lion

Hank Mobley chronology
No Room for Squares (1963)	The Turnaround! (1965)	Dippin' (1965)

The Turnaround! is an album by jazz tenor saxophonist Hank Mobley recorded on March 7, 1963 and on February 4, 1965. It was released in 1965 by Blue Note Records. It features performances by Mobley with trumpeter Donald Byrd, pianist Herbie Hancock, bassist Butch Warren and drummer Philly Joe Jones from the earlier session and trumpeter Freddie Hubbard, pianist Barry Harris, bassist Paul Chambers and drummer Billy Higgins from the latter.

The 1989 CD edition did not correspond to the original LP, instead omitting the 1963 session and collecting the February 5, 1965 session for the first time. The 2000 CD edition restored the sequence of the original LP.

It was released in November 2014 in Japan on a limited SHM-CD that consisted of the original LP sequence, two tracks from the 1963 session that had been included in the CD edition of Straight No Filter, and the remaining tracks from the 1965 session.

== Reception ==
The AllMusic review by Thom Jurek awarded the album 4 stars, stating: "In all this is a solid date, despite its time lapse, and one that gives us a solid picture of the two Mobleys."

Professional ratings
Review scores
Source	Rating
Allmusic	4/5 stars
The Penguin Guide to Jazz Recordings	3/4 stars

== Track listing ==
All compositions by Hank Mobley except where noted

=== 1965 LP / 2000 CD ===
1. "The Turnaround" - 8:15
2. "East of the Village" - 6:44
3. "The Good Life" (Sacha Distel, Jack Reardon) - 5:09
4. "Straight Ahead" - 7:02
5. "My Sin" - 6:53
6. "Pat 'n' Chat" - 6:27

=== 1989 CD ===
1. "Pat 'n' Chat" - 6:27
2. "Third Time Around" – 6:24
3. "Hank's Waltz" – 7:42
4. "The Turnaround" - 8:15
5. "Straight Ahead" - 7:02
6. "My Sin" - 6:53

=== 2014 Limited Japanese SHM-CD ===
1. "The Turnaround" - 8:18
2. "East of the Village" - 6:48
3. "The Good Life" - 5:10
4. "Straight Ahead" - 7:04
5. "My Sin" - 6:54
6. "Pat 'n' Chat" - 6:30
7. "Third Time Around" – 6:24
8. "Hank's Waltz" – 7:42
9. "The Feelin's Good" – 5:38
10. "Yes Indeed" - 5:32

== Recording Session Details ==
March 7, 1963 session: Donald Byrd, trumpet; Hank Mobley, tenor saxophone; Herbie Hancock, piano; Butch Warren, bass; Philly Joe Jones, drums.

- Old World, New Imports (originally released on No Room for Squares)
- Up A Step (originally released on No Room for Squares)
- The Feelin's Good
- East Of The Village
- Yes Indeed
- The Good Life

February 4, 1965 session: Freddie Hubbard, trumpet; Hank Mobley, tenor saxophone; Barry Harris, piano; Paul Chambers, bass; Billy Higgins, drums.

- Pat 'N Chat
- Third Time Around
- Hank's Waltz
- The Turnaround
- Straight Ahead
- My Sin
