= K. B. Blues =

Studio album by Kenny Burrell
- Released: 1979
- Recorded: February 10, 1957
- Studio: Van Gelder Studio, Hackensack, New Jersey
- Genre: Jazz
- Length: 36:21
- Label: Blue Note (Japan); GXF 3052
- Producer: Alfred Lion

Kenny Burrell chronology
Kenny Burrell (1957)	K. B. Blues (1979)	2 Guitars (1957)

K. B. Blues is an album by guitarist Kenny Burrell recorded in 1957 and originally released on the Japanese Blue Note label in 1979. The tracks were reissued on CD as part of Introducing Kenny Burrell: The First Blue Note Sessions but incorrectly identified as being recorded in 1956.

== Reception ==
Professional ratings
Review scores
Source	Rating
Allmusic	3/5 stars

Allmusic awarded the album 3 stars and reviewer Michael Erlewine says it is "worth searching for".

== Track listing ==
All compositions by Kenny Burrell except as indicated

1. "Nica's Dream" (Horace Silver) - 9:37
2. "Out for Blood" - 9:06
3. "K.B. Blues" - 6:24
4. "D.B. Blues" (Lester Young) - 5:50
5. "K.B. Blues" [Alternate Take] - 6:16

== Personnel ==
- Kenny Burrell - guitar
- Horace Silver - piano
- Hank Mobley - tenor saxophone
- Doug Watkins - bass
- Louis Hayes - drums
