= 2 Guitars =

Studio album by Kenny Burrell and Jimmy Raney
- Released: 1957
- Recorded: March 5, 1957
- Studio: Van Gelder Studio, Hackensack, New Jersey
- Genre: Jazz
- Length: 48:07
- Label: Prestige; PRLP 7119
- Producer: Teddy Charles

Kenny Burrell chronology
K. B. Blues (1957)	2 Guitars (1957)	John Jenkins with Kenny Burrell (1957)

2 Guitars is an album by guitarists Kenny Burrell and Jimmy Raney recorded in 1957 and released on the Prestige label.

== Reception ==
Professional ratings
Review scores
Source	Rating
Allmusic	3/5 stars

Allmusic awarded the album 3 stars with Scott Yanow stating: "This is a well-rounded set that may not contain any real surprises, but will be enjoyed by collectors of hard bop".

== Track listing ==
All compositions by Mal Waldron except where noted.

1. "Blue Duke" – 8:50
2. "Dead Heat" – 4:07
3. "Pivot" – 5:13
4. "Close Your Eyes" (Bernice Petkere) – 4:50
5. "Little Melonae" (Jackie McLean) – 9:29
6. "This Way" (Doug Watkins) – 12:25
7. "Out of Nowhere" (Johnny Green, Edward Heyman) – 4:31

== Personnel ==
- Kenny Burrell – guitar (tracks 1–6; KB with just rhythm section on 4)
- Jimmy Raney – guitar (tracks 1–3, 5–7; JR with just rhythm section on 7)
- Donald Byrd – trumpet (tracks 1–3, 5 & 6)
- Jackie McLean – alto saxophone (tracks 1–3, 5 & 6)
- Mal Waldron – piano
- Doug Watkins – bass
- Art Taylor – drums
