= Kenny Burrell (Prestige album) =

Studio album by Kenny Burrell
- Released: 1957
- Recorded: February 1, 1957; Van Gelder Studio, Hackensack, New Jersey
- Genre: Jazz
- Length: 36:21
- Label: Prestige; PRLP 7088
- Producer: Bob Weinstock

Kenny Burrell chronology
Earthy (1957)	Kenny Burrell (1957)	K. B. Blues (1957)

Kenny Burrell (also reissued as Blue Moods) is an album by guitarist Kenny Burrell recorded in 1957 and released on the Prestige label.

== Reception ==
Professional ratings
Review scores
Source	Rating
AllMusic	3.5/5 stars
Jazzwise	4/5 stars
The Rolling Stone Jazz Record Guide	4/5 stars

In the AllMusic review by Scott Yanow, he stated: "Guitarist Kenny Burrell, 25 at the time, is heard during one of his earlier sessions playing in his already recognizable straight-ahead style with a quintet... It's enjoyable music". A Jazzwise reviewer in 2025 wrote that the album was "Muscular and swinging when it needs to be ('Drum Boogie'), laid back when required ('All of You' and the smooth, skipping 'Don't Cry Baby') and possessed of an easy, almost conversational swing (especially on 'Strictly Confidential')".

== Track listing ==
1. "Don't Cry Baby" (Saul Bernie, James P. Johnson, Stella Unger) - 8:20
2. "Drum Boogie" (Roy Eldridge, Gene Krupa) - 9:14
3. "Strictly Confidential" (Bud Powell) - 6:25
4. "All of You" (Cole Porter) - 6:17
5. "Perception" (Kenny Burrell) - 6:05

== Personnel ==
- Kenny Burrell - guitar
- Cecil Payne - baritone saxophone (except track 4)
- Tommy Flanagan - piano
- Doug Watkins - bass
- Elvin Jones - drums

The album was reissued in 1964 as Blue Moods (Prestige 7308).
