= Curtain Call (Hank Mobley album) =

Studio album by Hank Mobley
- Released: 1984
- Recorded: August 18, 1957
- Studio: Van Gelder Studio, Hackensack, NJ
- Genre: Jazz, hard bop
- Length: 41:37
- Label: Blue Note; BNJ 61006
- Producer: Alfred Lion

Hank Mobley chronology
Hank Mobley (1957)	Curtain Call (1984)	Poppin' (1957)

Curtain Call (also titled Hank Mobley Quintet Featuring Sonny Clark) is an album by jazz saxophonist Hank Mobley, released on the Japanese Blue Note label in 1984. It was recorded on August 18, 1957 and features Mobley, trumpeter Kenny Dorham, bassist Jimmy Rowser, pianist Sonny Clark, and drummer Art Taylor.

== Reception ==
The Allmusic review by Lee Bloom awarded the album 3 stars stating "Despite an occasional tendency for Mobley's relaxed articulation to sound a bit languorous, his playing is generally enjoyable, and his writing exhibits character, maturity, and a uniquely rhythmic approach to crafting memorable melodies.".

Professional ratings
Review scores
Source	Rating
Allmusic	3/5 stars

== Track listing ==
All compositions by Hank Mobley except as indicated

1. "Don't Get Too Hip" - 10:59
2. "Curtain Call" - 5:27
3. "Deep in a Dream" (Jimmy Van Heusen, Eddie DeLange) - 6:01
4. "The Mobe" - 6:22
5. "My Reverie" (Claude Debussy, Larry Clinton) - 5:34
6. "On the Bright Side" - 7:14

== Personnel ==
- Hank Mobley - tenor saxophone
- Kenny Dorham - trumpet
- Sonny Clark - piano
- Jimmy Rowser - bass
- Art Taylor - drums

== Charts ==
Chart performance for "Curtain Call"
Chart (2022)	Peak position
German Albums (Offizielle Top 100)	32
