= Far Away Lands =

Studio album by Hank Mobley
- Released: 1984
- Recorded: May 26, 1967
- Studio: Van Gelder Studio, Englewood Cliffs
- Genre: Jazz
- Length: 35:55
- Label: Blue Note; BST 84425
- Producer: Alfred Lion

Hank Mobley chronology
Third Season (1967)	Far Away Lands (1984)	Hi Voltage (1968)

Far Away Lands is an album by jazz saxophonist Hank Mobley, recorded on May 26, 1967, but not released on the Blue Note label until 1984. It features performances by Mobley with trumpeter Donald Byrd, pianist Cedar Walton, bassist Ron Carter, and drummer Billy Higgins.

== Reception ==
The AllMusic review by Scott Yanow stated: "For this lesser-known outing, Mobley teams up with trumpeter Donald Byrd, pianist Cedar Walton, bassist Ron Carter, and drummer Billy Higgins for four of his songs (given such colorful titles as 'A Dab of This and That,' 'No Argument,' 'The Hippity Hop,' and 'Bossa for Baby'), along with a song apiece from Byrd and Jimmy Heath. An excellent outing, fairly late in the productive career of Hank Mobley.

Professional ratings
Review scores
Source	Rating
AllMusic	4/5 stars

== Track listing ==
All compositions by Hank Mobley except where noted.

1. "A Dab of This and That" - 5:10
2. "Far Away Lands" (Heath) - 5:36
3. "No Argument" - 6:33
4. "The Hippity Hop" - 5:41
5. "Bossa for Baby" - 6:08
6. "Soul Time" (Byrd) - 6:47

== Personnel ==
- Hank Mobley — tenor saxophone
- Donald Byrd — trumpet
- Cedar Walton — piano
- Ron Carter — bass
- Billy Higgins — drums
