= Mobley's Message =

Studio album by Hank Mobley
- Released: Early January 1957
- Recorded: July 20, 1956; Van Gelder Studio, Hackensack
- Genre: Jazz
- Length: 41:51
- Label: Prestige; PRLP 7061
- Producer: Bob Weinstock

Hank Mobley chronology
The Jazz Message of Hank Mobley (1956)	Mobley's Message (1957)	Mobley's 2nd Message (1956)

Professional ratings
Review scores
Source	Rating
Allmusic	4/5 stars
The Rolling Stone Jazz Record Guide	3/5 stars

Mobley's Message is an album by jazz saxophonist Hank Mobley, released on the Prestige label in 1957. It was recorded on July 20, 1956, and features performances by Mobley, Donald Byrd, Barry Harris, Doug Watkins and Art Taylor, with Jackie McLean guesting on one track.

== Track listing ==
All compositions by Hank Mobley except as indicated

1. "Bouncing with Bud" (Powell) - 7:00
2. "52nd Street Theme" (Monk) - 5:43
3. "Minor Disturbance" - 6:16
4. "Au Privave" (Parker) - 7:34
5. "Little Girl Blue" (Hart, Rodgers) - 8:44
6. "Alternating Current" - 6:34

== Personnel ==
- Hank Mobley - tenor saxophone
- Donald Byrd - trumpet - except track 5
- Barry Harris - piano
- Doug Watkins - bass
- Art Taylor - drums
- Jackie McLean - alto saxophone (#4 only)
