= The Jazz Message =

The Jazz Message of Hank Mobley

Studio album by Hank Mobley
- Released: 1956
- Recorded: January 30 & February 8, 1956; Van Gelder Studio, Hackensack
- Genre: Jazz
- Length: 41:30
- Label: Savoy; Savoy MG 12064
- Producer: Ozzie Cadena

Hank Mobley chronology
Hank Mobley Quartet (1956)	The Jazz Message of Hank Mobley (1956)	Mobley's Message (1956)

Professional ratings
Review scores
Source	Rating
Allmusic	3.5/5 stars

The Jazz Message is an album by jazz saxophonist Hank Mobley released on the Savoy label in 1956. It was recorded on February 8, 1956, and features performances by Mobley, Donald Byrd, Ronnie Ball, Horace Silver, Doug Watkins, Wendell Marshall, John LaPorta and Kenny Clarke. It was not issued as a Hank Mobley leader album until the CD era.

== Track listing ==
All compositions by Hank Mobley except as indicated.

1. "There Will Never Be Another You" (Gordon, Warren) – 5:51
2. "Cattin'" – 4:38
3. "Madeline" – 4:42
4. "When I Fall in Love" (Heyman, Young) – 3:47
5. "Budo" (Davis, Powell) – 7:32
6. "I Married an Angel" (Hart, Rodgers) – 7:00
7. "The Jazz Message (Freedom for All)" (Cadena) – 8:00

Recorded on January 30 (tracks 5–7) & February 8 (tracks 1–4), 1956.

== Personnel ==
- Hank Mobley – tenor saxophone (1–4)
- John LaPorta – alto saxophone (5–7)
- Donald Byrd – trumpet except track 3
- Ronnie Ball (1–4), Horace Silver (5–7) – piano
- Doug Watkins (1–4), Wendell Marshall (5–7) – bass
- Kenny Clarke – drums
