= Earthy (Kenny Burrell album) =

Studio album by Kenny Burrell
- Released: 1957
- Recorded: January 25, 1957
- Studio: Van Gelder Studio, Hackensack, New Jersey
- Genre: Jazz
- Length: 43:31
- Label: Prestige; PRLP 7102
- Producer: Bob Weinstock

Kenny Burrell chronology
All Day Long (1957)	Earthy (1957)	Kenny Burrell (1957)

Professional ratings
Review scores
Source	Rating
Allmusic	4.5/5 stars

Earthy is an album by the Prestige All Stars nominally led by guitarist Kenny Burrell recorded in 1957 and released on the Prestige label.

== Reception ==
The Allmusic site awarded the album 4½ stars stating "Dazzling stints by Kenny Burrell (g), Art Farmer (tpt), and Mal Waldron (p) on otherwise standard cuts".

== Track listing ==
All compositions by Mal Waldron except where noted

1. "Earthy" - 9:24
2. "What's Not" - 7:10
3. "I Wouldn't" (Hal McKusick) - 6:13
4. "The Front Line" (McKusick) - 6:11
5. "Dayee" (Kenny Burrell) - 14:33

== Personnel ==
- Kenny Burrell - guitar
- Al Cohn - tenor saxophone
- Art Farmer - trumpet
- Hal McKusick - alto saxophone
- Mal Waldron - piano
- Teddy Kotick - bass
- Ed Thigpen - drums
