= Hank Mobley Sextet =

Hank Mobley with Donald Byrd and Lee Morgan

Studio album by the Hank Mobley Sextet
- Released: Mid March 1957
- Recorded: November 25, 1956
- Studio: Van Gelder Studio; Hackensack, New Jersey
- Genre: Jazz
- Length: 37:18
- Label: Blue Note; BLP 1540
- Producer: Alfred Lion

The Hank Mobley Sextet chronology
Jazz Message No. 2 (1956)	Hank Mobley with Donald Byrd and Lee Morgan (1957)	Hank Mobley and His All Stars (1957)

Hank Mobley with Donald Byrd and Lee Morgan, also known as Hank Mobley Sextet, is an album by American jazz saxophonist Hank Mobley, recorded on November 25, 1956, and released on Blue Note the following year. The sextet features trumpeters Donald Byrd and Lee Morgan, backed by rhythm section Horace Silver, Paul Chambers, and Charli Persip.

== Reception ==
AllMusic awarded the album 4 stars.

Professional ratings
Review scores
Source	Rating
AllMusic	4/5 stars
DownBeat	4.5 stars

== Track listing ==
All compositions by Hank Mobley

=== Side 1 ===
1. "Touch and Go" – 9:18
2. "Double Whammy" – 8:12

=== Side 2 ===
1. "Barrel of Funk" – 11:21
2. "Mobleymania" – 8:27

=== CD reissue bonus track ===
5. "Barrel of Funk" (alternate take) – 11:16

== Personnel ==
=== Hank Mobley Sextet ===
- Hank Mobley – tenor saxophone
- Donald Byrd – trumpet
- Lee Morgan – trumpet
- Horace Silver – piano
- Paul Chambers – bass
- Charlie Persip – drums

=== Technical personnel ===
- Alfred Lion – producer
- Rudy Van Gelder – recording engineer
- Reid Miles – design
- Francis Wolff – photography
- Leonard Feather – liner notes
