= Red Rodney Returns =

Studio album by Red Rodney Quintet featuring Billy Root
- Released: May 1959
- Recorded: February 16 & 17, 1959
- Studio: Reco-Art Studios, Philadelphia, PA
- Genre: Jazz
- Length: 45:04
- Label: Argo; LP-643
- Producer: Dave Usher

Red Rodney chronology
Red Rodney: 1957 (1957)	Red Rodney Returns (1959)	Bird Lives! (1973)

Red Rodney Returns is an album by trumpeter Red Rodney which was recorded in 1959 and released on the Argo label.

Professional ratings
Review scores
Source	Rating
AllMusic	3/5 stars

== Track listing ==
All compositions by Danny Kent except where noted.

1. "Shaw 'Nuff" (Ray Brown, Gil Fuller, Dizzy Gillespie) – 6:36
2. "Red, Hot and Blue" – 6:05
3. "I Remember You" (Victor Schertzinger, Johnny Mercer) – 6:07
4. "5709" (Kent) – 4:23
5. "Whirlwind" – 5:43
6. "Jordu" (Duke Jordan) – 6:12
7. "Shelley" – 5:30
8. "Two by Two" (Jay Cave) – 4:28

== Personnel ==
- Red Rodney - trumpet
- Billy Root – tenor saxophone
- Danny Kent – piano
- Jay Cave – double bass
- Frank Young – drums
