= Mobley's 2nd Message =

Studio album by Hank Mobley
- Released: Early May 1957
- Recorded: July 27, 1956; Van Gelder Studio, Hackensack, New Jersey
- Genre: Jazz
- Length: 41:18
- Label: Prestige; PRLP 7082
- Producer: Bob Weinstock

Hank Mobley chronology
Mobley's Message (1956)	Mobley's 2nd Message (1957)	Jazz Message #2 (1956)

Mobley's 2nd Message is an album by jazz saxophonist Hank Mobley, released on the Prestige label in 1957. It was recorded on July 27, 1956, one week after Mobley's Message (1957), and features performances by Mobley, Kenny Dorham, Walter Bishop, Doug Watkins and Art Taylor.

== Track listing ==
All compositions by Hank Mobley except as indicated

1. "These Are the Things I Love" (Barlow, Harris) - 6:40
2. "Message from the Border" - 6:07
3. "Xlento" - 5:39
4. "The Latest" - 5:52
5. "I Should Care" (Cahn, Stordahl, Weston) - 10:04
6. "Crazeology" (Harris) - 6:56

== Personnel ==
- Hank Mobley - tenor saxophone
- Kenny Dorham - trumpet
- Walter Bishop - piano
- Doug Watkins - bass
- Art Taylor - drums
