= The Complete Blue Note Hank Mobley Fifties Sessions =

Box set by Hank Mobley
- Released: 1998
- Recorded: March 27, 1955 – February 9, 1958
- Genre: Jazz
- Length: 401:18
- Label: Mosaic Records
- Producer: Alfred Lion, Michael Cuscuna

The Complete Blue Note Hank Mobley Fifties Sessions is limited edition box set that was released by Mosaic Records in 1998. Included are Mobley's recordings for Blue Note in the late 1950s from the albums The Hank Mobley Quartet, Hank Mobley Sextet, Hank Mobley & His All-Stars, Hank Mobley Quintet, Hank, Hank Mobley, Curtain Call, Peckin' Time and Poppin' . The albums were recorded with Art Blakey, Donald Byrd, Paul Chambers, Sonny Clark, Kenny Dorham, Art Farmer, Bill Hardman, Milt Jackson, Philly Joe Jones, Wynton Kelly, Lee Morgan, Charlie Persip, Jimmy Rowser, Horace Silver, Art Taylor, Bobby Timmons, Wilbur Ware, and Doug Watkins.
