= The Beginning and the End (Clifford Brown album) =

Compilation album by Clifford Brown
- Released: 1973
- Recorded: March 21, 1952 & June 25, 1956
- Venue: Music City Club
- Genre: Hard bop Bebop
- Length: 34:22
- Label: Columbia
- Producer: Don Schlitten

Professional ratings
Review scores
| Source | Rating |
|---|---|
| AllMusic | 5/5 stars |
| The Penguin Guide to Jazz Recordings | 3/4 stars |

The Beginning and the End (Columbia Records, 1973) is a Clifford Brown compilation album. The album opens with two tracks that Clifford Brown recorded with Chris Powell's Blue Flames in 1952, and ends with recordings of a session held at Music City Club in Philadelphia in 1956. According to the liner notes, they are "The first and last recorded performances of one of the greatest soloists in the history of Jazz." According to Nick Catalano's biography of Clifford Brown, the Music City Club session could have taken place on May 31, 1955.

== Reception and legacy ==
The AllMusic reviewer concluded that "Clifford Brown's playing on this date is so memorable that the LP is essential for all jazz collections." Fellow trumpeter Christian Scott said that as a child he heard the album and thought that Brown "had a lot of heart and was compassionate". Returning to the album much later, he realised that Brown "was playing some pretty impossible things on the instrument [...] There's stuff that this guy did with the instrument that many fifty year old trumpet players would never attempt".

== Track listing ==
1. "I Come from Jamaica" (Chris Powell) – 2:39
2. "Ida Red" (Chris Powell) – 2:00
3. "Walkin'" (Richard Carpenter) – 11:38
4. "A Night in Tunisia" (Dizzy Gillespie) – 11:04
5. "Donna Lee" (Charlie Parker) – 7:11

== Personnel ==
- Clifford Brown – trumpet (all tracks)

Tracks 1–2

- Chris Powell – vocals, percussion
- Vance Wilson – alto saxophone, tenor saxophone
- Eddie Lambert – guitar
- Duke Wells – piano
- James Johnson – bass
- Osie Johnson – drums

Tracks 3–5

- Billy Root – tenor saxophone
- Ziggy Vines – tenor saxophone
- Sam Dockery – piano
- Adolph "Ace" Tisone – bass
- Ellis Tollin – drums
