= Jazz Message No. 2 =

Jazz Message #2

Studio album by Hank Mobley
- Released: Early May 1957
- Recorded: July 23 & November 7, 1956; Van Gelder Studio, Hackensack
- Genre: Jazz
- Length: 32:14
- Label: Savoy; Savoy MG 12092

Hank Mobley chronology
Mobley's 2nd Message (1956)	Jazz Message #2 (1957)	Hank Mobley with Donald Byrd and Lee Morgan (1957)

Professional ratings
Review scores
Source	Rating
Allmusic	3.5/5 stars

Jazz Message #2 (also released as Hard Bop and The Jazz Message of Hank Mobley Volume 2) is an album by jazz saxophonist Hank Mobley released on the Savoy label in 1957. It was recorded on July 23 & November 7, 1956 and features performances by Mobley, Donald Byrd, Lee Morgan, Hank Jones, Doug Watkins Barry Harris, Kenny Clarke and Art Taylor. Lee Morgan was very young in this recording (18 years old).

== Track listing ==
All compositions by Hank Mobley except as indicated

1. "Thad's Blues" (Thad Jones) - 9:48
2. "Doug's Minor B' Ok" (Watkins) - 6:40
3. "B. for B.B." - 6:31
4. "Blues Number Two" - 5:00
5. "Space Flight" - 4:15

Recorded on July 23 (3–5) and November 7, 1956 (1–2).

== Personnel ==
Tracks 1, 2

- Hank Mobley - tenor saxophone
- Lee Morgan - trumpet
- Hank Jones - piano
- Doug Watkins - bass
- Art Taylor - drums

Tracks 3–5

- Hank Mobley - tenor saxophone
- Donald Byrd - trumpet
- Barry Harris - piano
- Doug Watkins - bass
- Kenny Clarke - drums
