= Billy Root (saxophonist) =

American jazz saxophonist (1934–2013)

- Born: William Root; March 6, 1934; Philadelphia, Pennsylvania
- Died: July 30, 2013 (aged 79)
- Genres: Jazz; hard bop; bebop
- Occupation: Musician
- Instruments: Tenor saxophone; Baritone saxophone
- Years active: 1950-1999

William Root (March 6, 1934 – July 30, 2013) was an American jazz tenor and baritone saxophonist.

== Early life ==
Root was raised in a musical family; his father played drums in Philadelphia ensembles.

== Career ==
Root began playing professionally in the early 1950s, with Roy Eldridge, Hal McIntyre, Red Rodney, Bennie Green, and Buddy Rich. Later in the decade he worked extensively with Stan Kenton, Dizzy Gillespie, Hank Mobley, Lee Morgan, and Curtis Fuller. As a member of a Philadelphia-based sextet, Root's live recordings with trumpeter Clifford Brown ultimately became the second half of Brown's album The Beginning and the End.

He led his own ensembles from the late 1950s. In the 1960s he performed with Al Grey and Dakota Staton, and in 1968 settled in Las Vegas, where he played live in casinos for the next two decades. He recorded one album as leader, Live at Capozzoli's with trumpeter Vinnie Tanno, in 1999. Critic Steve Leowy noted that, "[w]hether lobbing shells or just playing it straight, Root and Tanno show the vibrancy and verve reminiscent of an earlier, innocent era, when joyous passion permeated every note."

== Discography ==
- Clifford Brown, The Beginning and the End (Columbia, 1956 [1973])
- Stan Kenton, Cuban Fire! (Capitol, 1956)
- Dizzy Gillespie, Dizzy in Greece (Verve, 1957)
- Al Grey, Dizzy Atmosphere (Speciality, 1957)
- Dizzy Gillespie, Birk's Works (Verve, 1958)
- Bennie Green, Soul Stirrin' (Blue Note, 1958)
- Hank Mobley, Monday Night at Birdland (Roulette, 1958[1959])
- Hank Mobley, Another Monday Night at Birdland (Roulette, 1959)
- Red Rodney, Red Rodney Returns (Argo, 1959)
- Stan Kenton, Kenton Live from the Las Vegas Tropicana (Capitol, 1961)
- Jack Sheldon, Jack's Groove (GNP, 1961)
- Billy Root, Live at Capozzoli's (Woofy, 1999)
