= Reach Out! (Hank Mobley album) =

Studio album by Hank Mobley
- Released: November 1968
- Recorded: January 19, 1968
- Studio: Van Gelder Studio, Englewood Cliffs
- Genre: Jazz
- Length: 37:56
- Label: Blue Note; BST 84288
- Producer: Francis Wolff

Hank Mobley chronology
| Hi Voltage (1968) | Reach Out! (1968) | The Flip (1970) |

Reach Out! is an album by jazz saxophonist Hank Mobley, recorded and released by the Blue Note label in 1968. It features performances by Mobley with trumpeter Woody Shaw, guitarist George Benson, pianist LaMont Johnson, bassist Bob Cranshaw, and drummer Billy Higgins.

== Reception ==
Professional ratings
Review scores
| Source | Rating |
|---|---|
| AllMusic | 2/5 stars |
| DownBeat | 4.5/5 stars |
| The Penguin Guide to Jazz Recordings | 3/4 stars |

AllMusic reviewer Stephen Thomas Erlewine stated, "Reach Out was one of the few times Hank Mobley left behind driving, aggressive hard bop, choosing to concentrate on lightly grooving bop and soul-jazz instead. Essentially, the session resulted in the most commercially oriented record he made, complete with two pop covers and a laidback, swinging vibe. That wouldn't necessarily be a bad thing, but the band sounds constrained by the material and their desire to make the music appeal to a wide audience ... no one sounds particularly enthusiastic, including Mobley. In fact, Mobley's presence on the record feels strangely minimal. Only during "Good Pickin's"—a laidback bop original that's easily the best thing here—does he come alive, weaving a spell with long, liquid lines, but its subtle grace just illustrates the problems with this curiously bland record".

In JazzTimes, Bill Shomaker called it a "severely blemished date" and wrote "only the truly clinical Hank Mobley fanatic is going to buy this ’68 anomaly. ... The real torture for the garden variety Mobley freak, however, is the knowledge that there are four real-deal tracks on this sextet date. Three are penned by Mobley, and all reflect his ability to spice basic blues and hard bop structures with a deft turn of phrase".

On All About Jazz, Robert Spencer noted, "By 1968, when this sextet date was recorded, the sweet mainstream jazz Hank Mobley loved and championed was on the defensive. This post-Lion Blue Note recording goes even farther than the gutbucket r & b that Lee Morgan was purveying in kowtowing to the rock and roll emperor: Mobley includes two pallid covers of contemporary soul hits ... Neither capture the burning dynamism of the originals ... Discs like this failed in their intention - to recapture an audience for jazz in its worst crisis - and are poignant in their documentation of fine artists searching for a viable direction. This disc is the tragedy of Hank Mobley in miniature".

== Track listing ==
All compositions by Hank Mobley except where noted.

1. "Reach Out (I'll Be There)" (Lamont Dozier, Eddie Holland) - 6:49
2. "Up, Over and Out" - 5:52
3. "Lookin' East" - 5:19
4. "Goin' Out of My Head" (Teddy Randazzo, Bob Weinstein) - 7:25
5. "Good Pickin's" - 5:30
6. "Beverly" (LaMont Johnson) - 7:01

== Personnel ==
- Hank Mobley – tenor saxophone
- Woody Shaw – trumpet, flugelhorn
- LaMont Johnson – piano
- George Benson – guitar
- Bob Cranshaw – bass
- Billy Higgins – drums
