= All Night Long (Kenny Burrell album) =

Studio album by Kenny Burrell
- Released: 1957
- Recorded: December 28, 1956
- Studio: Van Gelder Studio, Hackensack, New Jersey
- Genre: Jazz
- Length: 54:20
- Label: Prestige; PR 7073
- Producer: Bob Weinstock

Kenny Burrell chronology
Swingin' (1956)	All Night Long (1957)	All Day Long (1957)

All Night Long is an album by the Prestige All Stars, later credited to guitarist Kenny Burrell, recorded in 1956 and released on the Prestige label.

== Reception ==
Professional ratings
Review scores
Source	Rating
Allmusic	4/5 stars
The Penguin Guide to Jazz Recordings	3/4 stars

Scott Yanow of Allmusic reviewed the album, stating: "Two of guitarist Kenny Burrell's best sessions from the 1950s were this release and its companion, All Day Long. Burrell is teamed with an impressive group of young all-stars... fortunately, all of the musicians sound quite inspired, making this an easily recommended set."

== Track listing ==
1. "All Night Long" (Kenny Burrell) – 17:10
2. "Boo-Lu" (Hank Mobley) – 6:44
3. "Flickers" (Mal Waldron) – 6:10
4. "Li'l Hankie" (Hank Mobley) – 8:20

Bonus tracks on CD reissue in 1990:

5. "Body and Soul" (Frank Eyton, Johnny Green, Edward Heyman, Robert Sour) – 10:20
6. "Tune Up" (Miles Davis) – 5:36

== Personnel ==
- Kenny Burrell – guitar
- Donald Byrd – trumpet
- Hank Mobley – tenor saxophone
- Jerome Richardson – flute, tenor saxophone
- Mal Waldron – piano
- Doug Watkins – bass
- Art Taylor – drums

=== Production ===
- Bob Weinstock – supervisor
- Rudy Van Gelder – engineer
