= Workout (album) =

Studio album by Hank Mobley
- Released: March 1962
- Recorded: March 26, 1961
- Studio: Van Gelder Studio, Englewood Cliffs, NJ
- Genre: Jazz
- Length: 51:48 (2014 SHM-CD)
- Label: Blue Note; BST 84080
- Producer: Alfred Lion

Hank Mobley chronology
Roll Call (1960)	Workout (1962)	Another Workout (1961)

Professional ratings
Review scores
Source	Rating
Allmusic	4.5/5 stars
The Penguin Guide to Jazz Recordings	3.5/4 stars

Workout is an album by jazz tenor saxophonist Hank Mobley released on the Blue Note label in 1962. It features performances by Mobley, pianist Wynton Kelly, bassist Paul Chambers, guitarist Grant Green, and drummer Philly Joe Jones. The album was identified by Scott Yanow in his Allmusic essay "Hard Bop" as one of 17 Essential Hard Bop Recordings. In October 2014, it was released in Japan on SHM-CD, featuring a previously unissued take of "Three Coins in the Fountain".

== Track listing ==
All compositions by Hank Mobley except as indicated

1. "Workout" - 10:00
2. "Uh Huh" - 10:43
3. "Smokin'" - 7:30
4. "The Best Things in Life Are Free" (Brown, DeSylva, Henderson) - 5:18
5. "Greasin' Easy" - 6:58
6. "Three Coins in the Fountain" (Cahn, Styne) - 5:31 Bonus track on CD
7. "Three Coins in the Fountain" (Cahn, Styne) - 4:48 Bonus track on 2014 SHM-CD

== Personnel ==
- Hank Mobley — tenor saxophone
- Grant Green — guitar
- Wynton Kelly — piano
- Paul Chambers — bass
- Philly Joe Jones — drums
