= Third Season (album) =

Studio album by Hank Mobley
- Released: 1980
- Recorded: February 24, 1967
- Studio: Van Gelder Studio, Englewood Cliffs, NJ
- Genre: Jazz
- Length: 38:13
- Label: Blue Note; LT 1081
- Producer: Alfred Lion

Hank Mobley chronology
A Slice of the Top (1979)	Third Season (1980)	Far Away Lands (1984)

Alternative cover
- 1998 CD reissue

Third Season is an album by the jazz tenor saxophonist Hank Mobley recorded on February 24, 1967, but not released on the Blue Note label until 1980 as LT 1081. It contains performances by Mobley with trumpeter Lee Morgan, alto saxophonist James Spaulding, pianist Cedar Walton, bassist Walter Booker, drummer Billy Higgins, and guitarist Sonny Greenwich.

== Reception ==
The AllMusic review by Scott Yanow stated: "The music is mostly in the hard bop vein, with hints of modality and the gospel-ish piece "Give Me That Feelin'," but Greenwich's three solos are a bonus and the performances of five Mobley originals and one by Morgan are up to the usual caliber of Blue Note's releases. Pity that this one has been lost in the shuffle."

Professional ratings
Review scores
Source	Rating
AllMusic	4/5 stars
DownBeat	4.5/5 stars
The Rolling Stone Jazz Record Guide	3/5 stars
The Virgin Encyclopedia of Jazz	3/5 stars

== Track listing ==
All compositions by Hank Mobley except as indicated

1. "An Aperitif" - 6:57
2. "Don't Cry, Just Sigh" - 6:56
3. "The Steppin' Stone" (Lee Morgan) - 5:40
4. "Third Season" - 6:49
5. "Boss Bossa" - 5:15
6. "Give Me That Feelin'" - 6:36

== Personnel ==
- Hank Mobley – tenor saxophone
- James Spaulding – alto saxophone
- Lee Morgan – trumpet
- Cedar Walton – piano
- Sonny Greenwich – guitar
- Walter Booker – double bass
- Billy Higgins – drums
