= No Room for Squares =

Studio album by Hank Mobley
- Released: May 1964
- Recorded: March 7, 1963 (#3, 6); October 2, 1963 (all others)
- Studio: Van Gelder Studio, Englewood Cliffs, NJ
- Genre: Jazz
- Length: 42:12
- Label: Blue Note; BST 84149
- Producer: Alfred Lion

Hank Mobley chronology
Another Workout (1985)	No Room for Squares (1964)	The Turnaround! (1965)

No Room for Squares is an album by jazz tenor saxophonist Hank Mobley recorded on March 7 & October 2, 1963 and released on the Blue Note label. It features performances by Mobley, trumpeters Lee Morgan and Donald Byrd, pianists Andrew Hill and Herbie Hancock, bassists John Ore and Butch Warren, and drummer Philly Joe Jones. Material recorded at the March 7 session was also included on The Turnaround! with the entire session collected for the first time on the 1989 CD edition of Straight No Filter. The 1989 CD issue of No Room for Squares collects the entire October 2 session save an alternate take of "Carolyn" that was first issued in 2019 as part of The Complete Hank Mobley Blue Note Sessions 1963-70.

== Reception ==
The AllMusic review by Thom Jurek awarded the album 4 stars, stating: "All eight cuts here move with similar fluidity and offer a very gritty and realist approach to the roots of hard bop. Highly recommended." The Jazz Journal praised the album, described as "often inspired".

Professional ratings
Review scores
Source	Rating
Allmusic	4/5 stars
The Penguin Guide to Jazz Recordings	3.5/4 stars

== Track listing ==
All compositions by Hank Mobley except where noted

No.	Title	Length
1.	"Three Way Split"	7:49
2.	"Carolyn" (Lee Morgan)	5:30
3.	"Up a Step"	8:31
4.	"No Room for Squares"	6:57
5.	"Me 'N You" (Lee Morgan)	7:17
6.	"Old World, New Imports"	6:08

CD bonus tracks
No.	Title	Length
7.	"Carolyn" (Alternate take)	5:35
8.	"No Room for Squares" (Alternate take)	6:45

== Personnel ==
- Hank Mobley – tenor saxophone
- Lee Morgan – trumpet (tracks 1, 2, 4, 5, 7, 8)
- Donald Byrd – trumpet (3, 6)
- Andrew Hill – piano (1, 2, 4, 5, 7, 8)
- Herbie Hancock – piano (3, 6)
- John Ore – bass (1, 2, 4, 5, 7, 8)
- Butch Warren – bass (3, 6)
- Philly Joe Jones – drums

== Charts ==
Chart performance for No Room for Squares
Chart (2023)	Peak position
Croatian International Albums (HDU)	18
