= At the Cafe Bohemia =

- Volume 1

Live album by The Jazz Messengers
- Released: Early April 1956
- Recorded: November 23, 1955
- Venue: Café Bohemia; New York City
- Genre: Hard bop
- Length: 41:54 (Vol. 1); 64:48 (Vol. 1 CD reissue); 62:15 (Vol. 2 CD reissue)
- Label: Blue Note; BLP 1507; BLP 1508
- Producer: Alfred Lion

The Jazz Messengers chronology
Horace Silver and the Jazz Messengers (1956)	At the Cafe Bohemia (1956)	The Jazz Messengers (1956)

At the Cafe Bohemia
- Volume 2

At the Cafe Bohemia, Vols. 1 & 2 are a pair of separate but related live albums by the Jazz Messengers recorded at the Café Bohemia jazz club in Greenwich Village on November 23, 1955, and released on Blue Note in April 1956.

== Background ==
=== Release history ===
With the July 31, 2001 CD reissues, three additional tracks where added to each volume: "Lady Bird", "Deciphering the Message", and "What's New?" to the first, and "Just One for Those Things", "Hank´s Symphony" and "Gone with the Wind" to the second.

== Reception ==
Professional ratings
Review scores
Source	Rating
AllMusic (Vol. 1)	4/5 stars
AllMusic (Vol. 2)	4/5 stars
The Penguin Guide to Jazz (Vol. 1)	3.5/4 stars
The Penguin Guide to Jazz (Vol. 2)	3.5/4 stars

The AllMusic reviews called the albums "still timeless music" that have "influenced jazz up to present time".

The Penguin Guide to Jazz noted, while At the Cafe Bohemia didn't "match the intensity which the quintet secured at Birdland", the playing in general "is just as absorbing", calling saxophonist Hank Mobley "a somewhat unfocused stylist" while praising trumpeter Kenny Dorham as an "elusive brilliance [that] was seldom so extensively captured".

== Track listing ==
=== CD Reissues ===
At the Cafe Bohemia, Volume 1
No.	Title	Writer(s)	Length
1.	"Announcement by Art Blakey"		1:32
2.	"Soft Winds"	Benny Goodman	12:34
3.	"The Theme"	Kenny Dorham	6:11
4.	"Minor's Holiday"	Kenny Dorham	9:11
5.	"Alone Together"	Howard Dietz; Arthur Schwartz	4:15
6.	"Prince Albert (All the Things You Are)"	Kenny Dorham; Jerome Kern	8:51
7.	"Lady Bird" (reissue bonus track)	Tadd Dameron	7:30
8.	"What's New?" (reissue bonus track)	Johnny Burke; Bob Haggart	4:31
9.	"Deciphering the Message" (reissue bonus track)	Hank Mobley	10:13
Total length:			1:04:48

At the Cafe Bohemia, Volume 2
No.	Title	Writer(s)	Length
1.	"Announcement by Art Blakey"		0:38
2.	"Sportin' Crowd"	Hank Mobley	6:53
3.	"Like Someone in Love"	Johnny Burke; Jimmy Van Heusen	9:18
4.	"Yesterdays"	Otto Harbach; Jerome Kern	4:20
5.	"Avila and Tequila"	Hank Mobley	12:47
6.	"I Waited for You"	Gil Fuller; Dizzy Gillespie	9:47
7.	"Just One of Those Things"	Cole Porter	9:28
8.	"Hank's Symphony"	Hank Mobley	4:44
9.	"Gone with the Wind"	Herb Magidson; Allie Wrubel	7:27
Total length:			1:02:15

== Personnel ==
=== The Jazz Messengers ===
- Kenny Dorham – trumpet
- Hank Mobley – tenor saxophone
- Horace Silver – piano
- Doug Watkins – bass
- Art Blakey – drums

=== Technical personnel ===
==== Original ====
- Alfred Lion – producer
- Leonard Feather – liner notes
- John Hermansader – cover design
- Francis Wolff – photography

==== Reissue ====
- Michael Cuscuna – reissue producer
- Rudy Van Gelder – digital remastering
- Bob Bluementhal – liner notes
