= Roll Call (album) =

Studio album by Hank Mobley
- Released: Late June/early July 1961
- Recorded: November 13, 1960
- Studios: Van Gelder Studio, Englewood Cliffs
- Genre: Jazz
- Length: 42:48
- Labels: Blue Note; BST 84058
- Producer: Alfred Lion

Hank Mobley chronology
Soul Station (1960)	Roll Call (1961)	Workout (1961)

Professional ratings
Review scores
Source	Rating
Allmusic	4.5/5 stars
The Rolling Stone Jazz Record Guide	3/5 stars
The Penguin Guide to Jazz Recordings	3.5/4 stars

Roll Call is an album by jazz tenor saxophonist Hank Mobley. It features trumpeter Freddie Hubbard, pianist Wynton Kelly, bassist Paul Chambers, and drummer Art Blakey.

== Track listing ==
All compositions by Hank Mobley except as indicated.

1. "Roll Call" - 10:33
2. "My Groove Your Move" - 6:07
3. "Take Your Pick" - 5:27
4. "A Baptist Beat" - 8:54
5. "The More I See You" (Warren, Gordon) - 6:47
6. "The Breakdown" - 4:57
7. "A Baptist Beat" [alternate take] - 9:42 Bonus track on CD

== Personnel ==
- Hank Mobley - tenor saxophone
- Freddie Hubbard - trumpet
- Wynton Kelly - piano
- Paul Chambers - bass
- Art Blakey - drums

== Charts ==
Chart performance for Roll Call
Chart (2025)	Peak position
US Top Jazz Albums (Billboard)	21
