= All Day Long (album) =

Studio album by Kenny Burrell
- Released: April 1957
- Recorded: January 4, 1957
- Studio: Van Gelder Studio, Hackensack
- Length: 45:35
- Label: Prestige; PRLP 7081
- Producer: Bob Weinstock

Kenny Burrell chronology
All Night Long (1956)	All Day Long (1957)	Earthy (1957)

Professional ratings
Review scores
Source	Rating
AllMusic	3/5 stars
The Penguin Guide to Jazz	3/5 stars

All Day Long is a jazz album by the Prestige All Stars, later credited to trumpeter Donald Byrd and guitarist Kenny Burrell, released in 1957 on the Prestige label. All tracks were composed by the members of the band.

Side A of the LP only included the blues "All Day Long" described by Dan Morgenstern as "A simple but effective structure" that "controls the performance and keeps it solidly together: each soloist enters with a break, plays 12 bars, and then breaks again before extemporizing at great length". Ira Gitler in the original liner notes points out that the theme "A.T." is dedicated by Frank Foster to Art Taylor (hence the initials); "Say Listen" "derives its name from the attention calling phrase that (Byrd) often verbally employed".

== Album design ==
The cover of the original album in 1957 and of the CD reissue in 1990 show two photographs of the George Washington Bridge in New York connecting Manhattan to New Jersey, taken in the daytime and by night.

== Track listing ==
No.	Title	Writer(s)	Length
1.	"All Day Long"	Burrell	18:18
2.	"Slim Jim"	Byrd	7:28
3.	"Say Listen"	Byrd	6:41
4.	"A.T."	Foster	6:40
5.	"C.P.W." (*)	Foster	5:54

(*)Note: Track 5 was not part of original vinyl and was initially issued on the LP compilation The Best of Kenny Burrell (Prestige 1966). This is an additional track included in the CD version of 1990, digitally remastered by the engineer Phil De Lancie at Fantasy Studios in Berkeley (California).

== Personnel ==
- Kenny Burrell – guitar
- Donald Byrd – trumpet
- Frank Foster – tenor sax
- Tommy Flanagan – piano
- Doug Watkins – bass
- Art Taylor – drums
