= Hi Voltage =

Studio album by Hank Mobley
- Released: Early March 1968
- Recorded: October 9, 1967
- Studio: Van Gelder Studio, Englewood Cliffs, NJ
- Genre: Hard bop, soul jazz
- Length: 40:37
- Label: Blue Note; BST 84273
- Producer: Francis Wolff

Hank Mobley chronology
Far Away Lands (1967)	Hi Voltage (1968)	Reach Out! (1968)

Hi Voltage is an album by jazz tenor saxophonist Hank Mobley, recorded on October 9, 1967, and released on the Blue Note label the following year. It features performances by Mobley with alto saxophonist Jackie McLean, trumpeter Blue Mitchell, pianist John Hicks, drummer Billy Higgins, and bassist Bob Cranshaw.

== Reception ==
The AllMusic review by Thom Jurek stated, "In all, this date is solid, ranking with the very best of Mobley's offerings for Blue Note."

Professional ratings
Review scores
Source	Rating
AllMusic	4/5 stars
DownBeat	4/5 stars
Tom Hull	B+

== Track listing ==
All compositions by Hank Mobley

1. "High Voltage" - 8:11
2. "Two and One" - 6:11
3. "No More Goodbyes" - 5:43
4. "Advance Notice" - 5:59
5. "Bossa De Luxe" - 7:33
6. "Flirty Gerty" - 7:00

== Personnel ==
- Hank Mobley — tenor saxophone
- Jackie McLean — alto saxophone
- Blue Mitchell — trumpet
- John Hicks — piano
- Bob Cranshaw — bass
- Billy Higgins — drums
