= Another Workout =

Studio album by Hank Mobley
- Released: 1985
- Recorded: March 26, 1961 (track 6) and December 5, 1961 (tracks 1–5)
- Studio: Van Gelder Studio, Englewood Cliffs, NJ
- Genre: Jazz
- Length: 42:33
- Label: Blue Note; BST 84431
- Producer: Alfred Lion

Hank Mobley chronology
Workout (1961)	Another Workout (1985)	No Room for Squares (1963)

Alternative cover
- 1985 LP

Professional ratings
Review scores
Source	Rating
Allmusic	4/5 stars

Another Workout is an album by jazz tenor saxophonist Hank Mobley recorded during two sessions in 1961. Most of the album was recorded during a session on December 5, 1961, while the final track, "Three Coins in a Fountain," was recorded on March 26, 1961 (during the sessions for Mobley's Workout album). The album was not released until 1985 on the Blue Note. The musicians on Another Workout are the same as those on Workout, with the exception of guitarist Grant Green, who does not appear. The musicians are: Mobley is accompanied by pianist Wynton Kelly, bassist Paul Chambers and drummer Philly Joe Jones. According to writer Bob Blumenthal, producer Michael Cuscuna called the delay of this album's release "incomprehensible".

== Track listing ==
All compositions by Hank Mobley, except where noted.

1. "Out of Joe's Bag" - 5:07
2. "I Should Care" (Cahn, Stordahl, Weston) - 7:41
3. "Gettin' and Jettin'" - 7:43
4. "Hank's Other Soul" - 8:42
5. "Hello Young Lovers" (Hammerstein, Rodgers) - 8:03
6. "Three Coins in a Fountain" (Styne, Cahn) - 5:33 Not featured on the 2006 RVG edition, but included on Workout

== Personnel ==
- Hank Mobley - tenor saxophone
- Wynton Kelly - piano
- Paul Chambers - bass
- Philly Joe Jones - drums
