= Silver's Blue =

Studio album by Horace Silver
- Released: August 1957
- Recorded: July 2, 17–18, 1956
- Genre: Jazz
- Length: 44:23
- Label: Epic
- Producer: Cal Lampley

Horace Silver chronology
| Horace Silver and the Jazz Messengers (1955) | Silver's Blue (1957) | 6 Pieces of Silver (1956) |

Reissue cover

Professional ratings
Review scores
| Source | Rating |
|---|---|
| Allmusic | 3/5 stars |
| The Rolling Stone Jazz Record Guide | 3/5 stars |
| DownBeat | 3.5/5 stars |

Silver's Blue is a studio album by American jazz pianist Horace Silver recorded for the Epic label in 1956 featuring performances by Silver with Joe Gordon, Hank Mobley, Doug Watkins, and Kenny Clarke and another session with Donald Byrd and Art Taylor replacing Gordon and Clarke. Silver, Mobley, Watkins, and Byrd all had recently left The Jazz Messengers. These were Silver's first sessions as a leader after leaving the Messengers.

== Reception ==
The Allmusic review by Eugene Chadbourne awarded the album 3 stars and states "Two sessions in the mid-'50s produced the material for this album, which despite or perhaps because of being one of the historical early recordings of the Horace Silver Quintet, was later treated to a confusing mess of reissues, some of which never really mentioned what was so historic about the material in the first place. Maybe there was no reason to, since by the new millennium the type of groovy, funky jazz Silver was famous for had become so in demand that any recording of the authentic item was considered coated with golden fairy dust".

According to Nat Hentoff, Byrd had lip problems during one of the recording sessions. Hentoff considered Silver to be the most original soloist on the album; he awarded the album 3.5 stars.

== Track listing ==
All compositions by Horace Silver except as indicated

1. "Silver's Blue" - 7:44
2. "To Beat or Not to Beat" - 4:03
3. "How Long Has This Been Going On?" (George Gershwin, Ira Gershwin) - 4:17
4. "I'll Know" (Frank Loesser) - 7:24
5. "Shoutin' Out" - 6:33
6. "Hank's Tune" (Hank Mobley) - 5:26
7. "The Night Has a Thousand Eyes" (Buddy Bernier, Jerry Brainin) - 8:56

- Recorded in NYC on July 2 (tracks 2, 3 & 5), July 17 (tracks 1 & 4), and July 18 (tracks 6 & 7), 1956.

== Personnel ==
- Horace Silver - piano
- Donald Byrd - trumpet (tracks 1, 4, 6 & 7)
- Joe Gordon - trumpet (tracks 2, 3 & 5)
- Hank Mobley - tenor saxophone
- Doug Watkins - bass
- Art Taylor - drums (tracks 1, 4, 6 & 7)
- Kenny Clarke - drums (tracks 2, 3 & 5)
