= Poppin' (album) =

Studio album by Hank Mobley
- Released: 1980
- Recorded: October 20, 1957
- Studio: Van Gelder Studio, Hackensack
- Genre: Jazz
- Length: 40:18
- Label: Blue Note; BLP 1620; GXF 3066
- Producer: Alfred Lion

Hank Mobley chronology
Curtain Call (1957)	Poppin' (1980)	Peckin' Time (1959)

Alternative Cover
- TOCJ-1620 (Japanese edition)

Alternative Cover
- TOCJ-1620 (European edition)

Poppin' is an album by jazz saxophonist Hank Mobley first released on Blue Note Japan in 1980 as GXF 3066 (the BN catalogue number is 1620). It was recorded on October 20, 1957, and features Mobley, trumpeter Art Farmer, baritone saxophonist Pepper Adams, pianist Sonny Clark, bassist Paul Chambers, and drummer “Philly” Joe Jones.

== Reception ==
The Allmusic review by Stephen Thomas Erlewine awarded the album 4 stars stating "All of the musicians turn in fine performances (Clark in particular stands out with his lithe solos and tasteful accompaniment), and the result is a winning collection of straight-ahead hard bop that ranks as another solid addition to Mobley's strong catalog.".

Professional ratings
Review scores
Source	Rating
Allmusic	4/5 stars

== Track listing ==
All compositions by Hank Mobley except as indicated

1. "Poppin'" - 6:33
2. "Darn That Dream" (DeLange, VanHeusen) - 6:10
3. "Gettin' into Something" - 6:33
4. "Tune-Up" (Davis) - 10:53
5. "East of Brooklyn" - 10:09

== Personnel ==
- Hank Mobley - tenor saxophone
- Art Farmer - trumpet
- Pepper Adams - baritone saxophone
- Sonny Clark - piano
- Paul Chambers - bass
- Philly Joe Jones - drums
