= Hank Mobley and His All Stars =

Studio album by Hank Mobley
- Released: Mid-April 1957
- Recorded: January 13, 1957
- Studio: Van Gelder Studio; Hackensack, New Jersey
- Genre: Jazz
- Length: 38:06
- Label: Blue Note; BLP 1544
- Producer: Alfred Lion

Hank Mobley chronology
Hank Mobley Sextet (1957)	Hank Mobley and His All Stars (1957)	Hank Mobley Quintet (1957)

Hank Mobley and His All Stars is an album by American jazz saxophonist Hank Mobley, recorded on January 13, 1957, and released on Blue Note later that year. The quintet features vibraphonist Milt Jackson and Jazz Messengers rhythm section Horace Silver, Doug Watkins and Art Blakey.

== Reception ==
Professional ratings
Review scores
Source	Rating
AllMusic	4/5 stars

The AllMusic review by Scott Yanow calls the album "an above-average effort from some of the best."

== Track listing ==
All compositions by Hank Mobley

=== Side 1 ===
1. "Reunion" – 6:55
2. "Ultra Marine" – 10:36

=== Side 2 ===
1. "Don't Walk" – 7:50
2. "Lower Stratosphere" – 6:37
3. "Mobley's Musings" – 6:04

== Personnel ==
=== Hank Mobley and His All Stars ===
- Hank Mobley – tenor saxophone
- Milt Jackson – vibraphone
- Horace Silver – piano
- Doug Watkins – bass
- Art Blakey – drums

=== Technical personnel ===
- Alfred Lion – producer
- Rudy Van Gelder – recording engineer, mastering
- Reid Miles – design
- Francis Wolff – photography
- Leonard Feather – liner notes
