= Hank Mobley Quartet =

Studio album by the Hank Mobley Quartet
- Released: October 1955
- Recorded: March 27, 1955
- Studio: Van Gelder Studio; Hackensack, New Jersey
- Genre: Jazz
- Length: 25:11
- Label: Blue Note; BLP 5066
- Producer: Alfred Lion

Hank Mobley chronology
Hank Mobley Quartet (1955)	The Jazz Message of Hank Mobley (1956)

Hank Mobley Quartet is the debut ten-inch LP by American jazz saxophonist Hank Mobley, recorded on March 27, 1955 and released on Blue Note later that year. The quartet features rhythm section Horace Silver, Doug Watkins and Art Blakey.

== Release history ==
The album was released on CD only in Japan, as a limited edition.

== Reception ==
The AllMusic review by Ron Wynn states, "This debut of Mobley on Blue Note includes Horace Silver on piano and Doug Watkins on bass, plus someone named Art Blakey on drums."

Professional ratings
Review scores
Source	Rating
AllMusic	4/5 stars

== Track listing ==
All compositions by Hank Mobley, except as indicated.

=== Side 1 ===
1. "Hank's Prank" – 4:31
2. "My Sin" – 3:50
3. "Avila and Tequila" – 4:31

=== Side 2 ===
1. "Walkin' the Fence" – 3:38
2. "Love for Sale" (Porter) – 4:31
3. "Just Coolin'" – 4:10

== Personnel ==
=== Hank Mobley Quartet ===
- Hank Mobley – tenor saxophone
- Horace Silver – piano
- Doug Watkins – bass
- Art Blakey – drums

=== Technical personnel ===
- Alfred Lion – producer (uncredited)
- Rudy Van Gelder – recording engineer
- John Hermansader, Reid Miles – design
- Francis Wolff – photography
- Eugene St. Jean – liner notes
