= A Slice of the Top =

Studio album by Hank Mobley
- Released: 1979
- Recorded: March 18, 1966
- Studios: Van Gelder Studio, Englewood Cliffs, NJ
- Genre: Jazz
- Length: 38:39
- Labels: Blue Note; LT 995
- Producer: Alfred Lion

Hank Mobley chronology
Straight No Filter (1966)	A Slice of the Top (1979)	Third Season (1967)

Alternative cover
- 1995 limited CD reissue

A Slice of the Top is an album by jazz saxophonist Hank Mobley, recorded in early 1966. The album was not released on the Blue Note label until 1979. It features performances by Mobley with a larger than usual ensemble of trumpeter Lee Morgan, euphonium player Kiane Zawadi, tuba player Howard Johnson, alto saxophonist James Spaulding, pianist McCoy Tyner, bassist Bob Cranshaw, and drummer Billy Higgins. The arrangements were written by Duke Pearson. On the original LP, Reggie Workman was mistakenly identified on the sleeve as the bassist.

== Composition and Release ==
Mobley composed the music for the album in 1964 while imprisoned for a narcotics offence. The sheet music was given to Duke Pearson to arrange while Mobley was incarcerated.

Mobley was bitter about Blue Note delaying the release of the album until over a decade after it was recorded. In an interview, Mobley complained:

I have about five records on the shelf - Blue Note had half the black musicians around New York City, and now the records are just lying around. What they do is just hold it and wait for you to die.

== Reception ==
The AllMusic review by Scott Yanow stated: "Mobley, who continued to evolve into a more advanced player throughout the 1960s, fits right in with such adventurous players as altoist James Spaulding, trumpeter Lee Morgan (with whom Mobley recorded frequently), pianist McCoy Tyner, bassist Reggie Workman and drummer Billy Higgins. The inclusion of Kiane Zawadi on euphonium and Howard Johnson on tuba adds a lot of color to this memorable outing."

Professional ratings
Review scores
Source	Rating
AllMusic	4.5/5 stars
The Rolling Stone Jazz Record Guide	4/5 stars
DownBeat	4.5/5 stars

== Track listing ==
All compositions by Hank Mobley except as noted

1. "Hank's Other Bag" – 7:12
2. "There's a Lull In My Life" (Mack Gordon, Harry Revel) – 5:25
3. "Cute 'N Pretty" – 7:36
4. "A Touch of the Blues" – 8:46
5. "A Slice of the Top" - 9:40

== Personnel ==
- Hank Mobley - tenor saxophone
- James Spaulding - alto saxophone
- Lee Morgan - trumpet
- Kiane Zawadi - euphonium
- Howard Johnson - tuba
- McCoy Tyner - piano
- Bob Cranshaw - bass
- Billy Higgins - drums

== Charts ==
Chart performance for A Slice of the Top
Chart (2025)	Peak position
Croatian International Albums (HDU)	29
