= 6 Pieces of Silver =

Studio album by the Horace Silver Quintet
- Released: late 1956
- Recorded: November 10, 1956 (#1–8); June 15, 1958 (#9–10)
- Studio: Van Gelder; Hackensack, New Jersey
- Genre: Jazz
- Length: 38:56
- Label: Blue Note; BLP 1539
- Producer: Alfred Lion

Horace Silver chronology
Silver's Blue (1956)	6 Pieces of Silver (1956)	The Stylings of Silver (1957)

6 Pieces of Silver is an album by the Horace Silver Quintet, recorded on November 10, 1956, and released on Blue Note Records later that year. The quintet features brass section Donald Byrd and Hank Mobley and rhythm section Doug Watkins and Louis Hayes.

== Background ==
The front cover photograph was taken at Central Park West, Upper West Side.

== Reception ==
Professional ratings
Review scores
Source	Rating
AllMusic	4.5/5 stars
The Penguin Guide to Jazz	3.5/4 stars

The AllMusic review by Scott Yanow states, "The early Silver quintet was essentially The Jazz Messengers of the year before but already the band was starting to develop a sound of its own. 'Señor Blues' officially put Horace Silver on the map."

== Track listing ==
All tracks are written by Horace Silver, except as noted.

Side 1
No.	Title	Date recorded	Length
1.	"Cool Eyes"	November 10, 1956	5:55
2.	"Shirl"	November 10, 1956	4:16
3.	"Camouflage"	November 10, 1956	4:25
4.	"Enchantment"	November 10, 1956	6:22

Side 2
No.	Title	Writer(s)	Date recorded	Length
1.	"Señor Blues"		November 10, 1956	7:01
2.	"Virgo"		November 10, 1956	5:49
3.	"For Heaven's Sake"	Elise Bretton; Sherman Edwards; Donald Meyer	November 10, 1956	5:09

CD reissue bonus tracks
No.	Title	Date recorded	Length
8.	"Señor Blues" (alternative take)	November 10, 1956	6:38
9.	"Tippin'"	June 15, 1958	6:12
10.	"Señor Blues" (vocal version)	June 15, 1958	6:14

== Personnel ==
=== Horace Silver Quintet ===
==== November 10, 1956 ====
- Donald Byrd – trumpet (except "Shirl", "For Heaven's Sake")
- Hank Mobley – tenor saxophone (except "Shirl", "For Heaven's Sake")
- Horace Silver – piano
- Doug Watkins – bass
- Louis Hayes – drums

==== June 15, 1958 ====
- Donald Byrd – trumpet
- Junior Cook – tenor saxophone
- Horace Silver – piano
- Gene Taylor – bass
- Louis Hayes – drums
- Bill Henderson – vocals (except "Tippin'")

=== Technical personnel ===
- Alfred Lion – producer
- Rudy Van Gelder – recording engineer, mastering
- Reid Miles – design
- Francis Wolff – photography
- Leonard Feather – liner notes
