= Dippin' =

Studio album by Hank Mobley
- Released: Mid August 1966
- Recorded: June 18, 1965
- Studios: Van Gelder Studio, Englewood Cliffs, NJ
- Genre: Jazz
- Length: 42:40
- Labels: Blue Note; BST 84209
- Producer: Alfred Lion

Hank Mobley chronology
The Turnaround (1965)	Dippin' (1966)	A Caddy for Daddy (1966)

Dippin' is an album by jazz saxophonist Hank Mobley released on the Blue Note label in 1966. It is the second of nine Blue Note sessions to feature Mobley alongside Lee Morgan during the trumpeter's second stint with the label. It is also the second of nine consecutive Hank Mobley recording sessions to feature Billy Higgins.

== Reception ==
Professional ratings
Review scores
Source	Rating
AllMusic	4.5/5 stars
DownBeat	3.5/5 stars
The Penguin Guide to Jazz Recordings	3/4 stars

The AllMusic review by Thom Jurek awarded the album 4.5 stars, calling it "one of Hank Mobley's finer moments" and "a fine document of Mobley's abilities as a bandleader and composer".

== Track listing ==
All compositions by Hank Mobley except as noted

1. "The Dip" – 7:57
2. "Recado Bossa Nova" (Luiz Antonio, Djalma Ferreira) – 8:13
3. "The Break Through" – 5:51
4. "The Vamp" – 8:21
5. "I See Your Face Before Me" (Arthur Schwartz, Howard Dietz) – 5:29
6. "Ballin'" – 6:49

== Personnel ==
- Hank Mobley – tenor saxophone
- Lee Morgan – trumpet
- Harold Mabern, Jr. – piano
- Larry Ridley – bass
- Billy Higgins – drums

== Album production ==
- Rudy Van Gelder – recording and mixing
- Alfred Lion – producer
- Francis Wolff – cover photo
- Reid Miles – cover design

== Charts ==
Chart performance for Dippin'
Chart (2026)	Peak position
UK Jazz & Blues Albums (Official Charts)	30
