= Horace Silver and the Jazz Messengers =

1956 jazz album by Horace Silver and the Jazz Messengers

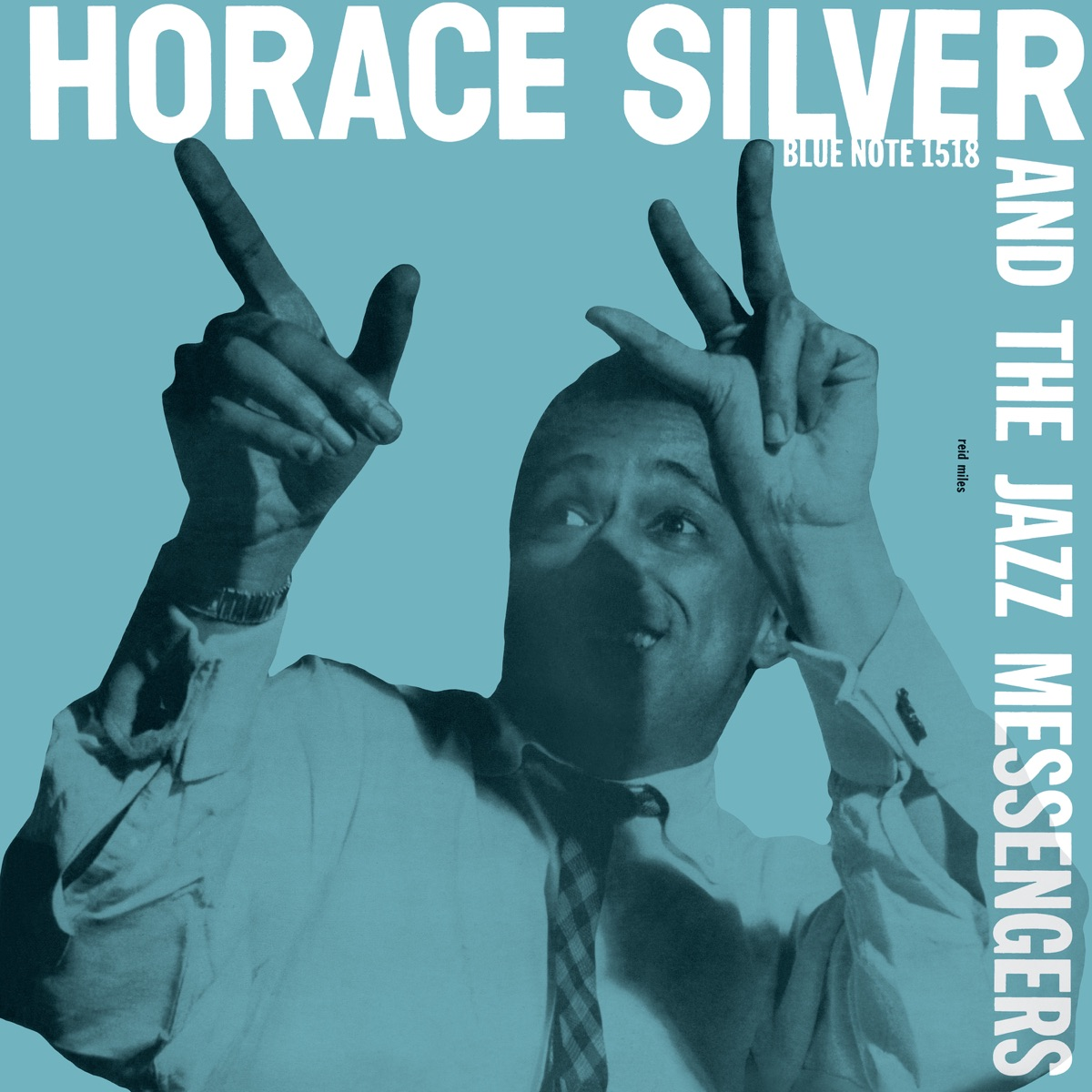

Compilation album by Horace Silver and the Jazz Messengers
- Released: October 1956
- Recorded: November 13, 1954; February 6, 1955
- Studio: Van Gelder; Hackensack, New Jersey
- Genre: Hard bop
- Length: 43:50
- Label: Blue Note; BLP 1518
- Producer: Alfred Lion

Horace Silver chronology
Horace Silver Trio and Art Blakey-Sabu (1955)	Horace Silver and the Jazz Messengers (1956)	Silver's Blue (1956)

Jazz Messengers chronology
Horace Silver and the Jazz Messengers (1956)	At the Cafe Bohemia, Vol. 1 (1956)

Horace Silver Quintet, Vol. 3

Studio album by the Horace Silver Quintet
- Released: 1955
- Recorded: November 13, 1954
- Studio: Van Gelder Studio; Hackensack, NJ
- Label: Blue Note; BLP 5058

Horace Silver Quintet, Vol. 4

Studio album by the Horace Silver Quintet
- Released: 1955
- Recorded: February 6, 1955
- Studio: Van Gelder Studio; Hackensack, NJ
- Label: Blue Note; BLP 5062

Horace Silver and the Jazz Messengers is an album by Horace Silver and the Jazz Messengers compiling two 1955 10" LPs—Horace Silver Quintet, Vol. 3 (BLP 5058) and Horace Silver Quintet, Vol. 4 (BLP 5062)—recorded on November 13, 1954, and February 6, 1955, respectively, and released on Blue Note in October 1956—Silver’s debut 12". The quintet features horn section Hank Mobley and Kenny Dorham and rhythm section Doug Watkins and Art Blakey.

== Background ==
=== Recording ===
One of the most successful tunes from the album, "The Preacher", was almost rejected for recording by producer Alfred Lion, who thought it was "too old-timey", but reinstated at the insistence of Blakey and Silver, who threatened to cancel the session until he had written another tune to record in its place if it wasn’t included. According to Silver, the track showed that the band could "reach way back and get that old time, gutbucket barroom feeling with just a taste of the back-beat".

=== Release ===
Originally released as an LP, the album has subsequently been reissued on CD several times.

=== Style and legacy ===
The music on the album mixes bebop influences with blues and gospel feels.

These recordings helped establish the hard bop style.

These were the first sessions in which he used the quintet format which he would largely use for the rest of his career.

== Reception ==
Professional ratings
Review scores
Source	Rating
AllMusic	5/5 stars
The Penguin Guide to Jazz	3.5/4 stars
The Rolling Stone Jazz Record Guide	5/5 stars

AllMusic critic Scott Yanow called it "a true classic".

== Track listing ==
=== Horace Silver and the Jazz Messengers – BLP 1518 ===
All tracks are written by Horace Silver, except as noted.

Side 1
No.	Title	Date recorded	Length
1.	"Room 608"	November 13, 1954	5:22
2.	"Creepin' In"	November 13, 1954	7:26
3.	"Stop Time"	November 13, 1954	4:07
4.	"To Whom It May Concern"	February 6, 1955	5:11

Side 2
No.	Title	Writer(s)	Date recorded	Length
5.	"Hippy"		February 6, 1955	5:23
6.	"The Preacher"		February 6, 1955	4:18
7.	"Hankerin'"	Hank Mobley	February 6, 1955	5:18
8.	"Doodlin'"		November 13, 1954	6:45

=== Horace Silver Quintet, Vol. 3 – BLP 5058 ===
All tracks are written by Horace Silver.

Side 1
No.	Title	Date recorded	Length
1.	"Room 608"	November 13, 1954
2.	"Creepin' In"	November 13, 1954

Side 2
No.	Title	Date recorded	Length
1.	"Doodlin'"	November 13, 1954
2.	"Stop Time"	November 13, 1954

=== Horace Silver Quintet, Vol. 4 – BLP 5062 ===
All tracks are written by Horace Silver, except as noted.

Side 1
No.	Title	Date recorded	Length
1.	"Hippy"	February 6, 1955
2.	"The Preacher"	February 6, 1955

Side 2
No.	Title	Writer(s)	Date recorded	Length
1.	"Hankerin'"	Mobley	February 6, 1955
2.	"To Whom It May Concern"		February 6, 1955

== Personnel ==
=== Horace Silver Quintet ===
- Horace Silver – piano
- Kenny Dorham – trumpet
- Hank Mobley – tenor saxophone
- Doug Watkins – bass
- Art Blakey – drums

=== Technical personnel ===
- Alfred Lion – production
- Rudy Van Gelder – recording engineer
- Reid Miles – design
- Francis Wolff – photography
