= Hank Mobley Quintet =

Studio album by the Hank Mobley Quintet
- Released: Early August 1957
- Recorded: March 8, 1957
- Studio: Van Gelder Studio; Hackensack, New Jersey
- Genre: Jazz
- Length: 57:22
- Label: Blue Note; BLP 1550
- Producer: Alfred Lion

Hank Mobley chronology
Hank Mobley and His All Stars (1957)	Hank Mobley Quintet (1957)	Hank (1957)

Hank Mobley Quintet, also known as Hank Mobley with Farmer, Silver, Watkins, Blakey, is an album by American jazz saxophonist Hank Mobley recorded on March 8, 1957 and released on Blue Note later that year. The quintet features trumpeter Art Farmer and rhythm section Horace Silver, Doug Watkins and Art Blakey.

== Background ==
These musicians were the first lineup of The Jazz Messengers, with Farmer instead of Kenny Dorham.

=== Release history ===
The album was remastered in 2008 by Rudy Van Gelder and issued on CD.

== Reception ==
Professional ratings
Review scores
Source	Rating
AllMusic	4.5/5 stars

The AllMusic review by Steve Leggett states, "Mobley might not have been out there pushing the envelope with his instrument, but here he plays with confidence and lyrical economy, making this easily one of his best outings."

== Track listing ==
All compositions by Hank Mobley

=== Side 1 ===
1. "Funk in Deep Freeze" – 6:50
2. "Wham and They're Off" – 7:42
3. "Fin de l'affaire" – 6:39

=== Side 2 ===
1. "Startin' from Scratch" – 6:43
2. "Stella-Wise" – 7:18
3. "Base on Balls" – 7:33

=== CD reissue bonus tracks ===
7. "Funk in Deep Freeze" (Alternate Take) – 6:57
8. "Wham and They're Off" (Alternate Take) – 7:37

== Personnel ==
=== Hank Mobley Quintet ===
- Hank Mobley – tenor saxophone
- Art Farmer – trumpet
- Horace Silver – piano
- Doug Watkins – bass
- Art Blakey – drums

=== Technical personnel ===
- Alfred Lion – producer
- Rudy Van Gelder – recording engineer
- Ralph Eck – mastering
- Harold Feinstein – design
- Francis Wolff – photography
- Robert Levin – liner notes
