= A Caddy for Daddy =

Studio album by Hank Mobley
- Released: Mid-September 1967
- Recorded: December 18, 1965
- Studio: Van Gelder Studio, Englewood Cliffs, NJ
- Genre: Jazz
- Length: 39:50
- Label: Blue Note; BST 84230
- Producer: Alfred Lion

Hank Mobley chronology
Dippin' (1965)	A Caddy for Daddy (1967)	Straight No Filter (1966)

A Caddy for Daddy is an album by jazz saxophonist Hank Mobley, recorded on December 18, 1965, and released on the Blue Note label in 1967. It features performances by Mobley with trumpeter Lee Morgan, trombonist Curtis Fuller, pianist McCoy Tyner, bassist Bob Cranshaw, and drummer Billy Higgins.

== Reception ==
Professional ratings
Review scores
Source	Rating
AllMusic	4.5/5 stars
The Penguin Guide to Jazz Recordings	3/4 stars

The AllMusic review by Scott Yanow awarded the album 4½ stars, stating, "For this CD, which is a straight reissue of a 1965 session, Mobley is joined by trumpeter Lee Morgan, trombonist Curtis Fuller, pianist McCoy Tyner, bassist Bob Cranshaw, and drummer Billy Higgins (a typically remarkable Blue Note lineup) for the infectious title cut, three other lesser-known but superior originals, plus Wayne Shorter's 'Venus Di Mildew.' Recommended."

== Track listing ==
All tracks are written by Hank Mobley except where noted.

No.	Title	Writer(s)	Length
1.	"A Caddy for Daddy"		9:23
2.	"The Morning After"		9:45
3.	"Venus Di Mildew"	Wayne Shorter	7:13
4.	"Ace Deuce Trey"		7:15
5.	"3rd Time Around"		6:14
Total length:			39:50

== Personnel ==
- Hank Mobley – tenor saxophone
- Curtis Fuller – trombone
- Lee Morgan – trumpet
- McCoy Tyner – piano
- Bob Cranshaw – double bass
- Billy Higgins – drums
