= Soul Station =

1960 studio album by Hank Mobley

Studio album by Hank Mobley
- Released: Early October 1960
- Recorded: February 7, 1960
- Studios: Van Gelder; Englewood Cliffs, New Jersey
- Genre: Hard bop
- Length: 37:23
- Labels: Blue Note; BLP 4031
- Producer: Alfred Lion

Hank Mobley chronology
Another Monday Night at Birdland (1959)	Soul Station (1960)	Roll Call (1960)

Soul Station is an album by American jazz saxophonist Hank Mobley recorded on February 7, 1960, and released on Blue Note later that year. Mobley's quartet features rhythm section Wynton Kelly, Paul Chambers and Art Blakey.

== Background ==
=== Recording ===
Recorded at the Van Gelder Studio and rooted in the hard bop style, Mobley's quartet features Art Blakey (his past bandleader in the Jazz Messengers), and Wynton Kelly and Paul Chambers, who Mobley would join in the Miles Davis Quintet by year's end.

=== Composition ===
The album's bookends are two standards, "Remember" by Irving Berlin and "If I Should Lose You" by Ralph Rainger and Leo Robin. Between these standards are four new Mobley compositions, featuring the bluesy title track and the uptempo "This I Dig of You".

=== Liner notes ===
In the liner notes to the Rudy Van Gelder CD edition, jazz critic Bob Blumenthal explains how the album is understood to be, for Mobley, what Saxophone Colossus or Giant Steps were for Sonny Rollins or John Coltrane respectively. Blumenthal goes on to describe the recording as "one of the finest programs of music on Blue Note or any other label."

== Reception ==
Professional ratings
Review scores
Source	Rating
AllMusic	5/5 stars
DownBeat	4/5 stars
The Penguin Guide to Jazz Recordings	4/4 stars
The Rolling Stone Jazz Record Guide	4/5 stars

AllMusic reviewer Stacia Proefrock concluded: "Overall, this is a stellar set from one of the more underrated musicians of the bop era."

Pete Welding of DownBeat praised the album, calling it "a well-balanced and tasty blowing session that benefits from thoughtful preparation, [and which] finds the tenor saxophonist fronting a quartet composed of three of the finest rhythm men in the business."

== Track listing ==
All compositions by Hank Mobley, except where noted.

Side 1
No.	Title	Writer(s)	Length
1.	"Remember"	Irving Berlin	5:41
2.	"This I Dig of You"		6:25
3.	"Dig Dis"		6:08

Side 2
No.	Title	Writer(s)	Length
1.	"Split Feelin's"		4:55
2.	"Soul Station"		9:06
3.	"If I Should Lose You"	Ralph Rainger; Leo Robin	5:08

== Personnel ==
=== Musicians ===
- Hank Mobley – tenor saxophone
- Wynton Kelly – piano
- Paul Chambers – bass
- Art Blakey – drums

=== Technical personnel ===
- Alfred Lion – producer
- Rudy Van Gelder – recording engineer, mastering
- Reid Miles – cover design
- Francis Wolff – photography
- Joe Goldberg – liner notes

== Charts ==
Chart performance for Soul Station
Chart (2021)	Peak position
Swedish Vinyl Albums (Sverigetopplistan)	5
