= Peckin' Time =

Studio album by Hank Mobley and Lee Morgan
- Released: late 1959
- Recorded: February 9, 1958
- Studio: Van Gelder Studio; Hackensack, NJ
- Genre: Jazz
- Length: 41:42 (LP); 62:16 (CD)
- Label: Blue Note; BLP 1574
- Producer: Alfred Lion

Hank Mobley chronology
Poppin' (1957)	Peckin' Time (1959)	Monday Night at Birdland (1958)

Lee Morgan chronology
Candy (1957)	Peckin' Time (1959)	Monday Night at Birdland (1958)

Peckin' Time is an album credited to American jazz saxophonist Hank Mobley and trumpeter Lee Morgan recorded on February 9, 1958 and released on Blue Note the following year. The two are backed by rhythm section Wynton Kelly, Paul Chambers, and Charlie Persip.

== Reception ==
Professional ratings
Review scores
Source	Rating
AllMusic	4.5/5 stars
DownBeat	3.5/5 stars
The Penguin Guide to Jazz Recordings	3.5/4 stars

The AllMusic review by Steve Leggett states, "It all adds up to a fine program, and if Mobley didn't push the envelope a whole lot, his lyrical and economical playing was always appropriate and graceful, and that's certainly the case here."

== Track listing ==
All tracks are written by Hank Mobley, except as noted.

Side 1
No.	Title	Writer(s)	Length
1.	"High and Flighty"		6:09
2.	"Speak Low"	Kurt Weill; Ogden Nash	7:12
3.	"Peckin' Time"		6:54

Side 2
No.	Title	Length
1.	"Stretchin' Out"	9:04
2.	"Git-Go Blues"	12:25

CD bonus tracks
No.	Title	Length
6.	"High and Flighty" (alternate take)	6:35
7.	"Speak Low" (alternate take)	7:13
8.	"Stretchin' Out" (alternate take)	6:46

== Personnel ==
=== Musicians ===
- Hank Mobley – tenor saxophone
- Lee Morgan – trumpet
- Wynton Kelly – piano
- Paul Chambers – bass
- Charlie Persip – drums

=== Technical personnel ===
- Alfred Lion – producer
- Rudy Van Gelder – recording engineer, mastering
- Francis Wolff – photography
- Ira Gitler – liner notes
