= Doug Watkins =

American jazz double bassist (1934–1962)

- Doug Watkins [date unknown]

Background information
- Born: March 2, 1934; Detroit, Michigan, United States
- Died: February 5, 1962 (aged 27) near Holbrook, Arizona
- Genres: Jazz
- Occupations: Musician; composer
- Instruments: Double bass; cello
- Years active: 1950–1962
- Labels: Blue Note; Prestige; Atlantic

Douglas Watkins (March 2, 1934 – February 5, 1962) was an American jazz double bassist. He was best known for being an accompanist to various hard bop artists in the Detroit area, including Donald Byrd and Jackie McLean.

== Biography ==
Watkins was born in Detroit, Michigan, United States. An original member of the Jazz Messengers, he later played in Horace Silver's quintet and freelanced with Gene Ammons, Kenny Burrell, Donald Byrd, Art Farmer, Jackie McLean, Hank Mobley, Lee Morgan, Sonny Rollins, and Phil Woods among others.

Some of Watkins' best-known work can be heard, when as a 22-year-old, he appeared on the 1956 album Saxophone Colossus by tenor saxophonist Sonny Rollins, with Max Roach and Tommy Flanagan.

According to Horace Silver's autobiography, Let's Get to the Nitty Gritty, Watkins, along with Silver, later left Art Blakey's Jazz Messengers because the other members of the band at the time (Kenny Dorham, Hank Mobley and Blakey) had serious drug problems, whereas Watkins and Silver were tired of being harassed and searched by the police every time they went to a gig in a new city and club.

When Charles Mingus briefly ventured over to the piano stool in 1961, he hired Watkins to take over the bass part; Oh Yeah and Tonight at Noon were the results.

Watkins recorded only two albums as leader: Watkins at Large for Transition; and Soulnik for New Jazz. The latter, recorded in 1960, with Yusef Lateef, features Watkins on cello with Herman Wright backing him on bass. The cello was an instrument he had started to play only a few days before the recording session.

Watkins died in an automobile accident near Holbrook, Arizona, on February 5, 1962, while traveling from Arizona to San Francisco to meet drummer Philly Joe Jones for a gig.

== Discography ==
=== As leader ===
- 1956: Watkins at Large (Transition)
- 1960: Soulnik (New Jazz)

=== As sideman ===
With Pepper Adams

- Baritones and French Horns (Prestige, 1957)
- Critic's Choice (World Pacific, 1957)
- The Pepper-Knepper Quintet (MetroJazz, 1958) with Jimmy Knepper
- 10 to 4 at the 5 Spot (Riverside, 1958)

With Gene Ammons

- Jammin' with Gene (Prestige, 1956)
- Funky (Prestige, 1957)
- Blue Gene (Prestige, 1958)
- Boss Tenor (Prestige, 1960)
- Velvet Soul (Prestige, 1960 [1964])
- Angel Eyes (Prestige, 1960 [1965])
- Nice an' Cool (Moodsville, 1961)
- Jug (Prestige, 1961)

With Art Blakey

- At the Cafe Bohemia, Vol. 1 (Blue Note, 1955)
- At the Cafe Bohemia, Vol. 2 (Blue Note, 1955)
- Originally (Columbia, 1956 [1982])

With Tina Brooks

- Minor Move (Blue Note, 1958)

With Kenny Burrell

- All Night Long (Prestige, 1956)
- All Day Long (Prestige, 1957)
- Kenny Burrell (Prestige, 1957)
- K. B. Blues (Blue Note, 1957 [1979])
- 2 Guitars - with Jimmy Raney (Prestige, 1957)

With Donald Byrd

- Byrd's Eye View (Transition, 1955)
- Byrd Blows on Beacon Hill (Transition, 1956)
- 2 Trumpets (Prestige, 1956) - with Art Farmer
- Jazz Eyes (Regent, 1957) - with John Jenkins
- Byrd in Paris (Brunswick, 1958)
- Parisian Thoroughfare (Brunswick, 1958)
- Fuego (Blue Note, 1959)
- Byrd in Flight (Blue Note, 1960)
- Chant (Blue Note, 1961)

With John Coltrane

- Dakar (Prestige, 1957 [1963])

With Tommy Flanagan

- The Cats (Prestige, 1957)

With Curtis Fuller

- New Trombone (Prestige, 1957)

With Red Garland

- Coleman Hawkins with the Red Garland Trio (Swingville, 1959)
- Satin Doll (Prestige, 1959 [1971])
- Rediscovered Masters (Prestige, 1959 [1977])

With Benny Golson

- Gettin' with It (New Jazz, 1959)

With Bill Hardman

- Saying Something (Savoy 1961)

With Wilbur Harden

- Mainstream 1958 (Savoy, 1958)

With Thad Jones

- Mad Thad (Period, 1957)
- Olio (Prestige, 1957)

With Yusef Lateef

- Jazz for the Thinker (Savoy, 1957)
- Jazz Mood (Savoy, 1957)

With Jackie McLean

- Presenting... Jackie McLean (Ad Lib, 1955)
- Lights Out! (Prestige, 1956)
- 4, 5 and 6 (Prestige, 1956)
- Jackie McLean & Co. (Prestige, 1957)
- Alto Madness (Prestige, 1957) - with John Jenkins
- Bluesnik (Blue Note, 1961)

With Charles Mingus

- Oh Yeah (Atlantic, 1961)
- Tonight at Noon (Atlantic, 1961)

With Hank Mobley

- Hank Mobley Quartet (Blue Note, 1955)
- The Jazz Message of Hank Mobley (Savoy, 1956)
- Mobley's Message (Prestige, 1956)
- Mobley's 2nd Message (Prestige, 1956)
- Jazz Message No. 2 (Savoy, 1956)
- Hank Mobley and his All Stars (Blue Note, 1957)
- Hank Mobley Quintet (Blue Note, 1957)

With Lee Morgan

- Introducing Lee Morgan (Savoy, 1956)
- Candy (Blue Note, 1957)

With The Prestige All Stars

- Wheelin' & Dealin' (Prestige, 1957)

With Paul Quinichette

- On the Sunny Side (Prestige, 1957)

With Dizzy Reece

- Soundin' Off (Blue Note, 1960)

With Rita Reys

- The Cool Voice of Rita Reys (Columbia, 1956)

With Sonny Rollins

- Saxophone Colossus (Prestige, 1956)
- Newk's Time (Blue Note, 1957)

With Horace Silver

- Horace Silver and the Jazz Messengers (Blue Note, 1955)
- Silver's Blue (Epic, 1956)
- 6 Pieces of Silver (Blue Note, 1956)

With Louis Smith

- Here Comes Louis Smith (Blue Note, 1957)

With Idrees Sulieman

- Roots (New Jazz, 1958) with the Prestige All Stars

With Billy Taylor

- Interlude (Moodsville, 1961)

With Phil Woods

- Pairing Off (Prestige, 1956)
