= Straight No Filter =

Studio album by Hank Mobley
- Released: 1986
- Recorded: March 7, 1963 (#8–9); October 2, 1963 (#6–7); February 4, 1965 (#4–5); June 17, 1966 (#1–3)
- Studio: Van Gelder Studio, Englewood Cliffs, NJ
- Genre: Jazz, post-bop
- Length: 41:36 original LP; 59:12 CD reissue
- Label: Blue Note; BST 84435
- Producer: Alfred Lion

Hank Mobley chronology
A Caddy for Daddy (1965)	Straight No Filter (1986)	A Slice of the Top (1966)

Straight No Filter is an album by jazz saxophonist Hank Mobley, recorded mostly in 1963 but not released on the Blue Note label until 1985. The CD edition compiles performances recorded at four different sessions from 1963 to 1966.

== Reception ==
The Allmusic review by Ronnie D. Lankford Jr. awarded the album 4½ stars stating "Straight No Filter will be welcomed by Mobley's fans and lovers of hard bop. It shouldn't be missed.".

Professional ratings
Review scores
Source	Rating
Allmusic	4.5/5 stars

== Track listing ==
All compositions by Hank Mobley, except where noted.

1985 LP

1. "Straight No Filter" – 5:58
2. "Chain Reaction" – 11:02
3. "Soft Impressions" – 4:48
4. "Third Time Around" – 6:25
5. "Hank's Waltz" – 7:43
6. "The Feelin's Good" – 5:40

2001 CD reissue

1. "Straight No Filter" – 5:58
2. "Chain Reaction" – 11:02
3. "Soft Impressions" – 4:48
4. "Third Time Around" – 6:25
5. "Hank's Waltz" – 7:43
6. "Syrup and Biscuits" – 5:36
7. "Comin' Back" – 6:26
8. "The Feelin's Good" – 5:40
9. "Yes Indeed" (Sy Oliver) – 5:34

== Personnel ==
Tracks 1–3

- Hank Mobley – tenor saxophone
- Lee Morgan – trumpet
- McCoy Tyner – piano
- Bob Cranshaw – bass
- Billy Higgins – drums

Tracks 4–5

- Hank Mobley – tenor saxophone
- Freddie Hubbard – trumpet
- Barry Harris – piano
- Paul Chambers – bass
- Billy Higgins – drums

Tracks 6–7

- Hank Mobley – tenor saxophone
- Lee Morgan – trumpet
- Andrew Hill – piano
- John Ore – bass
- Philly Joe Jones – drums

Tracks 8–9

- Hank Mobley – tenor saxophone
- Donald Byrd – trumpet
- Herbie Hancock – piano
- Butch Warren – bass
- Philly Joe Jones – drums
