= Hank Mobley =

American jazz saxophonist and composer (1930–1986)

- Mobley, c. 1956

Background information
- Born: Henry Mobley; July 7, 1930; Eastman, Georgia, U.S.
- Died: May 30, 1986 (aged 55) Philadelphia, Pennsylvania, U.S.
- Genres: Jazz; hard bop; soul jazz
- Occupations: Musician; composer
- Instrument: Tenor saxophone
- Works: Hank Mobley discography
- Years active: 1949–1986
- Labels: Blue Note; Prestige; Savoy

Henry Mobley (July 7, 1930 – May 30, 1986) was an American jazz tenor saxophonist and composer. Mobley was described by Leonard Feather as the "middleweight champion of the tenor saxophone", a metaphor used to describe his tone, that was neither as aggressive as John Coltrane nor as mellow as Lester Young, and his style that was laid-back, subtle and melodic, especially in contrast with players such as Coltrane and Sonny Rollins. The critic Stacia Proefrock claimed him "one of the most underrated musicians of the bop era." Mobley's compositions include "Double Exposure", "Soul Station", and "Dig Dis".

== Early life and education ==
Mobley was born in Eastman, Georgia, but was raised in Elizabeth, New Jersey, near Newark. He described himself as coming from a musical family and spoke of his uncle playing in a jazz band. As a child, Mobley played piano.

When he was 16, an illness kept him in the house for several months. In response, his grandmother bought him a saxophone to help him occupy his time. He tried to enter a music school in Newark but was not accepted as he was not a resident, so he taught himself theory and harmony from books that his grandmother bought for him, while also teaching himself to play the tenor saxophone.

== Career ==
=== 1949–1956: Early career and Jazz Messengers years ===
At 19, he started to play with local bands and, months later, worked for the first time with such musicians as Dizzy Gillespie and Max Roach. Roach introduced Mobley to the New York jazz scene in 1951, and over the next two years the latter began composing and recording tunes of his own. He played with multiple R&B bands during this period, and played for two weeks in 1953 with the Duke Ellington Orchestra when saxophonist Jimmy Hamilton was recovering from dental work. When Charlie Parker heard Mobley's playing, he advised the young musician to take more influence from blues music.

In April 1953, he was hired by Max Roach to play on the album released as The Max Roach Quartet featuring Hank Mobley. He later appeared on two Roach sessions recorded in 1957 and 1958 for EmArcy Records.

Shortly after working with Roach, he began working regularly with another drummer and bandleader, Art Blakey. He and Blakey took part in one of the earliest hard bop sessions, alongside pianist Horace Silver, bassist Doug Watkins and trumpeter Kenny Dorham. The results of these sessions were released as Horace Silver and the Jazz Messengers. At this point, the band was a collective, sometimes appearing and recording under the names of either Silver or Blakey. Mobley was also in the Jazz Messengers for the recording of the live album At the Cafe Bohemia, and he appeared on the Columbia Records studio album The Jazz Messengers. Mobley used the Jazz Messengers' rhythm section as his backing band for his 1955 Blue Note Records debut, Hank Mobley Quartet. When the Silver/Watkins/Blakey version of the Jazz Messengers split up in 1956, Mobley continued working with Silver for a short time, appearing on Silver's Blue, 6 Pieces of Silver, and The Stylings of Silver. Mobley worked for brief periods with Blakey a few years later, rejoining the drummer's band (which was called "Art Blakey and the Jazz Messengers" and was no longer a collective) in the spring and summer of 1959. He also hired Blakey to play on two of his Blue Note solo albums recorded in 1960.

=== 1956–1970: Blue Note years ===
Mobley recorded steadily during the second half of the 1950s for Blue Note Records, a series of albums which featured him with Lee Morgan, Donald Byrd, Art Farmer, Kenny Dorham, Jackie McLean, Pepper Adams, Milt Jackson, Sonny Clark, Bobby Timmons, Herbie Hancock, Wynton Kelly, Paul Chambers, and Philly Joe Jones, among others. Mobley's former Messengers rhythm section of Silver, Watkins, and Blakey backed him on Hank Mobley and His All Stars and Hank Mobley Quintet. In 1958, Mobley was a sideman on Max Roach's album The Max Roach 4 Plays Charlie Parker, playing on three tracks. Dorham, saxophone player George Coleman, and bassists George Morrow and Nelson Boyd also recorded on the album, which consisted entirely of Parker compositions. In March 1959, Mobley rejoined the Jazz Messengers; with this edition of the band, he recorded At the Jazz Corner of the World and the studio album first released in 2020 as Just Coolin'. During this same period, Mobley and Blakey appeared together on a Sonny Clark recording session that was first released in 1979 as My Conception. Mobley was with the Jazz Messengers during the Newport Jazz Festival that summer, but soon after left the band and was replaced by Wayne Shorter.

During the 1960s, he worked chiefly as a leader, and continued to record for Blue Note until 1970. Notable records from this period include Soul Station (1960), generally considered to be his finest recording, and Roll Call (1960). Both of these albums featured Blakey on drums, and they were the final recordings Mobley made with the drummer. In a 2020 review of Soul Station, the Recording Academy's Grammy Awards website called the album Mobley's "most rewarding listen despite not breaking the mold". Grammy has also referred to the album as "effortlessly elegant". The Guardian gave Mobley's four "classic" albums (Peckin' Time, Soul Station, Roll Call, and Workout) five stars, noting that "[f]or once, the word 'classic' is justified." The article referred to his "infinite subtlety" and ability as "an ingenious composer" as justification for this rating.

During this period of his career, he performed with bop and hard bop musicians including Grant Green, Freddie Hubbard, Sonny Clark, Wynton Kelly, and Philly Joe Jones, and formed a particularly productive partnership with trumpeter Lee Morgan, having appeared on each other's albums and Johnny Griffin's A Blowin' Session. Mobley was briefly a member of the Miles Davis band in 1961 during the period when Davis was searching for a tenor saxophone player to permanently replace John Coltrane. Mobley is heard on the album Someday My Prince Will Come (on two tracks, playing alongside Coltrane), and the live recordings In Person: Live at the Blackhawk and At Carnegie Hall. JazzTimes noted that around the time he played with Davis, Mobley "retooled his sound" from a lighter to a harder-edged tone.

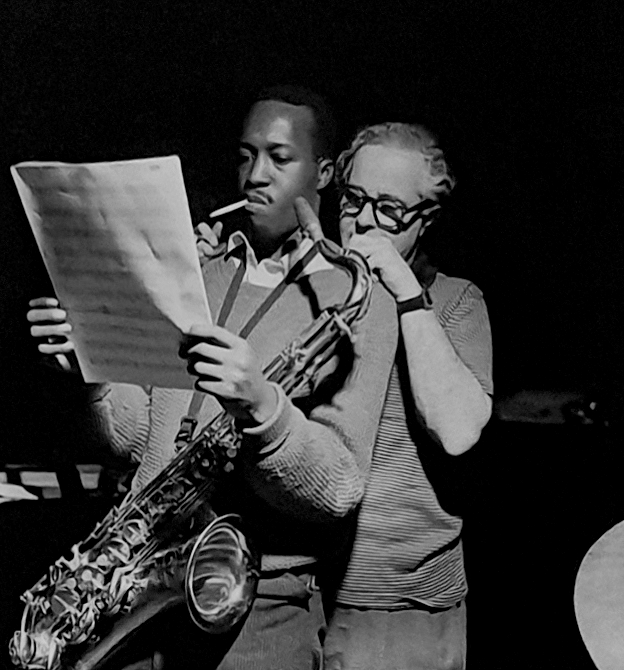
Mobley and Alfred Lion, 1960

In 1961, Mobley recorded two of his own albums, Workout and Another Workout, although Another Workout was not released until 1985. Both featured a rhythm section of Wynton Kelly, Paul Chambers, and Philly Joe Jones, all of whom were in Davis's bands during the late 1950s. Producer Michael Cuscuna called the delay of the latter album's release "incomprehensible" and "astonishing", according to writer Bob Blumenthal. The personnel on Workout included guitarist Grant Green, Wynton Kelly, Paul Chambers, and Philly Joe Jones, while Another Workout featured the same personnel, excluding Green. Mobley rehearsed extensively before his 1960s Blue Note recordings, typically twice during the week preceding a Saturday studio session, with Blue Note paying for the rehearsals and recordings. Alfred Lion, co-producer of the label, would frequently direct the band's tempo or critique studio takes until he was pleased with them.

Mobley recorded No Room for Squares in 1964, featuring trumpeters Donald Byrd and Lee Morgan, with DownBeat remarking that on the album Mobley "conveyed quiet authority", and followed a year later with A Caddy for Daddy. Mobley, Lee Morgan, and soul jazz pianist Harold Mabern recorded another mid-1960s album, Dippin', in one day. According to Samuel Chell, No Room for Squares was "the first session on which [Mobley] would begin to sacrifice lyric inspiration and subtlety of phrasing to a harder sound and stiffer rhythmic approach".

In 1964, while serving a prison sentence for narcotics possession, Mobley wrote songs that were later recorded for the album A Slice of the Top. The album was recorded in 1966 but was not released until 1979. The popularity of Mobley's albums decreased during the mid-1960s, though he continued to record regularly this period. Three critically acclaimed albums recorded during the mid- to late-1960s include A Caddy for Daddy, Hi Voltage, and The Flip. Apart from his album Reach Out!, also recorded in the late 1960s, Mobley avoided progressive jazz and the electric sound popular with jazz musicians during this period.

=== 1970–1986: retirement ===
One of Mobley's final albums, titled Breakthrough!, was recorded in 1972 with baritone saxophonist Charles Davis, pianist Cedar Walton, bassist Sam Jones, and drummer Billy Higgins. Scott Yanow noted that Mobley's career was soon to "eclipse" following this record date.

In 1973, shortly before the end of his career, he began a musical collaboration with Muhal Richard Abrams, although the two never recorded together. Following Mobley's semi-retirement, pianist Tete Montoliu and Mobley recorded one track together on the 1980 album I Wanna Talk About You, the jazz standard "Autumn Leaves".

In 1979, in an interview with John Litweiler, Mobley commented, "It's hard for me to think of what could be and what should have been."

Mobley gave a speech at the Blue Note Town Hall concert in 1985.

== Personal life ==
Mobley became addicted to heroin in the late 1950s, and in 1958 was imprisoned. He continued to struggle with his drug addiction during the 1960s.

A longtime smoker, Mobley was forced to retire in the mid-1970s, due to lung problems. He also had problems with homelessness in his later years and struggled to stay in touch with his fellow musicians. He worked two engagements at the Angry Squire in New York City – November 22 and 23, 1985, and January 11, 1986 – in a quartet with Duke Jordan and guest singer Lodi Carr, a few months before his death.

He died of pneumonia in 1986, aged 55, having also suffered from lung cancer.

== Legacy ==
Jazz radio host Bob Perkins described Mobley's style as "round, throaty, and distinctive", noting that despite "lukewarm appraisals of his artistry by critics, Hank Mobley overcame some major stumbling blocks to acquire a place in the history of jazz music."

Mosaic Records released two multidisc compilations of Mobley's Blue Note recordings. The Complete Blue Note Hank Mobley Fifties Sessions was released by the label in 1998, and The Complete Hank Mobley Blue Note Sessions 1963–70 was released in 2019. GQ noted that seven of Mobley's 12 Blue Note albums recorded in the 1963 to 1970 period were quickly slated for release, with the others "chopped up and mixed and matched—which denied Mobley his proper place in the music of the time and left him deeply frustrated." Mobley himself was dismayed by the record label's tendency to pressure him into studio sessions, only to decide not to release the recorded music. For instance, Mobley's album Poppin' was recorded in 1957 and released 23 years later.

The Spectator lamented that "an unfortunate side effect of 20th century Modernism is that [listenability] doesn't put you in the history books", referencing Mobley's style and the lack of attention paid to his work, as compared to John Coltrane and Sonny Rollins. According to fellow saxophonist Gary Bartz, the fact his compositions were not organized with one publishing company made profiting from them difficult.

In November 2020, the Van Gelder Studio's first livestream video was a tribute to Mobley. In 2022, saxophonist Art Themen purchased a saxophone that had previously been owned by Ronnie Scott and, before him, by Mobley. The Grammy's article "Let Me Play The Answers: 8 Jazz Artists Honoring Black Geniuses" cited Mobley as an influence on jazz trumpeter Bruce Harris, and Art Blakey's contribution to Soul Station as, metaphorically, the "hottest part of the flame" according to former Jazz Messengers drummer Ralph Peterson Jr.
