= Joe Henderson discography =

This is the discography for American jazz musician Joe Henderson.

Year indicates (latest) recording date; releases were usually in the same year or at least the following, otherwise noted. Albums without available recording dates are placed at the end of presumed year of recording.

== As leader/co-leader ==
Recording date	Title	Label	Year released	Notes / Personnel
1963-06	Page One	Blue Note	1963	Quintet with Kenny Dorham, McCoy Tyner, Butch Warren and Pete La Roca
1963-09	Our Thing	Blue Note	1964	Quintet with Kenny Dorham, Andrew Hill, Eddie Khan and Pete La Roca
1964-04	In 'n Out	Blue Note	1965	Quintet with Kenny Dorham, McCoy Tyner, Richard Davis and Elvin Jones
1964-11	Inner Urge	Blue Note	1966	Quartet with McCoy Tyner, Bob Cranshaw and Elvin Jones
1966-01	Mode for Joe	Blue Note	1966	Septet with Lee Morgan, Curtis Fuller, Bobby Hutcherson, Cedar Walton, Ron Carter and Joe Chambers
1966	Forces of Nature: Live at Slugs'	Blue Note	2024	Live – Quartet with McCoy Tyner (co-leader), Henry Grimes and Jack DeJohnette
1967-08	The Kicker	Milestone	1968	Sextet with Mike Lawrence, Grachan Moncur III, Kenny Barron, Ron Carter and Louis Hayes
1968-04	Four	Verve	1994	Live – Quartet with Wynton Kelly, Paul Chambers and Jimmy Cobb
1968-04	Straight, No Chaser	Verve	1996	Live – Quartet with Wynton Kelly, Paul Chambers and Jimmy Cobb
1967-09, 1968-05	Tetragon	Milestone	1968	Quartets with Kenny Barron/Don Friedman, Ron Carter and Louis Hayes/Jack DeJohnette
1969-05	Power to the People	Milestone	1969	Quartet/Quintet with Herbie Hancock, Ron Carter, Jack DeJohnette and Mike Lawrence
1970-09	If You're Not Part of the Solution, You're Part of the Problem	Milestone	1970	Live – Quintet/Sextet with Woody Shaw, George Cables, Ron McClure, Lenny White and Tony Waters. Expanded re-release in 2004 as At the Lighthouse.
1970-09	Jazz Patterns	Everest	1982	Live – Quintet/Sextet with Woody Shaw, George Cables, Ron McClure, Lenny White and Tony Waters.
1970-09, 1971-05	In Pursuit of Blackness	Milestone	1971	Live – Sextet with Woody Shaw, George Cables, Ron McClure, Lenny White and Tony Waters; Studio – Sextet with Curtis Fuller, Pete Yellin, George Cables, Stanley Clarke and Lenny White
1971-08	Joe Henderson in Japan	Milestone	1973	Live – Quartet with Hideo Ichikawa, Kunimitsu Inaba and Motohiko Hino
1972-03 or 1972-04	Black Is the Color	Milestone	1972	Quintet/Octet with George Cables, David Horowitz, Georg Wadenius, Dave Holland, Ron Carter, Jack DeJohnette, Airto Moreira, and Ralph MacDonald
1973-01, 1973-02, 1973-04	Multiple	Milestone	1973	Quintet/Sextet with Larry Willis, James Ulmer, John Thomas, Dave Holland, Jack DeJohnette and Arthur Jenkins
1973-10	Canyon Lady	Milestone	1975	Sextet + Brass Section with Mark Levine, John Heard, Eric Gravatt, Carmelo Garcia, Victor Pantoja, Julian Priester, Luis Gasca, George Duke, Oscar Brashear, John Hunt, Hadley Caliman, Ray Pizzi, Vincent Denham, Nicholas Tenbroek, and Francisco Aguabella
1973-10	The Elements	Milestone	1974	Quintet/Septet with Alice Coltrane, Charlie Haden, Leon "Ndugu" Chancler, Kenneth Nash, Baba Duru Oshun and Michael White
1975-02	Black Miracle	Milestone	1976	Ensemble with Oscar Brashear, Snooky Young, George Bohanon, Don Waldrop, Hadley Caliman, Dawilli Gonga (George Duke), Lee Ritenour, Ron Carter, Harvey Mason and Bill Summers
1974-10, 1975-04	Black Narcissus	Milestone	1977	Quintets with Joachim Kühn, Patrick Gleeson, David Friesen/Jean-François Jenny-Clark, Daniel Humair/Jack DeJohnette and Bill Summers
1977-06, 1978-11	Barcelona	Enja	1979	Trio with Wayne Darling and Ed Soph
1979-08, 1979-12	Relaxin' at Camarillo	Contemporary	1981	Quartets with Chick Corea, Richard Davis/Tony Dumas and Peter Erskine/Tony Williams
1980-01	Mirror Mirror	MPS	1980	Quartet with Chick Corea, Ron Carter and Billy Higgins
1985-11	The State of the Tenor, Vols. 1 & 2	Blue Note	1986, 1987	Live – Trio with Ron Carter and Al Foster
1987-07	An Evening with Joe Henderson	Red	1987	Live – Trio with Charlie Haden and Al Foster
1987-07	More from an Evening with Joe Henderson	Red	2009	Live – Trio with Charlie Haden and Al Foster
1991-03	The Standard Joe	Red	1992	Trio with Rufus Reid and Al Foster
1991-09	Lush Life: The Music of Billy Strayhorn	Verve	1992	Quintet with Wynton Marsalis, Stephen Scott, Christian McBride and Gregory Hutchinson
1993-10	So Near, So Far (Musings for Miles)	Verve	1993	Quartet with John Scofield, Dave Holland and Al Foster
1994-09, 1994-11	Double Rainbow: The Music of Antonio Carlos Jobim	Verve	1995	Quartet/Quintet with Eliane Elias/Herbie Hancock, Oscar Castro-Neves, Nico Assumpção/Christian McBride and Paulo Braga/Jack DeJohnette
1992-03, 1996-06	Big Band	Verve	1997	Big Band with Dick Oatts, Pete Yellin, Steve Wilson, Bobby Porcelli, Craig Handy, Rich Perry, Tim Ries, Charles Pillow, Joe Temperley, Gary Smulyan, Freddie Hubbard, Raymond Vega, Idrees Sulieman, Jimmy Owens, Jon Faddis, Lew Soloff, Marcus Belgrave, Nicholas Payton, Tony Kadleck, Michael Mossman, Virgil Jones, Earl Gardner, Byron Stripling, Conrad Herwig, Jimmy Knepper, Robin Eubanks, Keith O'Quinn, Larry Farrell, Kiane Zawadi, David Taylor, Douglas Purviance, Chick Corea, Helio Alves, Ronnie Mathews, Christian McBride, Joe Chambers, Al Foster, Lewis Nash and Paulinho Braga
1997-05	Porgy & Bess	Verve	1997	Septet with Conrad Herwig, John Scofield, Stefon Harris, Tommy Flanagan, Dave Holland, Jack DeJohnette, Chaka Khan and Sting

Collaborations
With Stanley Clarke, Chick Corea, Freddie Hubbard and Lenny White

- The Griffith Park Collection (Elektra Musician, 1982) – rec. 1981

With Arnett Cobb and Jimmy Heath

- Tenor Tribute (Soul Note, 1990) – rec. 1988

== As a member ==
- V.A.(All-Star Band), Aurex Jazz Festival '80 - Battle of the Horns (Eastworld, 1980) – Live
- The Paris Reunion Band, For Klook (Sonet, 1987) – Live rec. 1986
- The Paris Reunion Band, Hot Licks (Sonet, 1988) – Live rec. 1987
- The Paris Reunion Band, Jazzbühne Berlin '88 (Amiga, 1989) – Live rec. 1988
- The Carnegie Hall Jazz Band, The Carnegie Hall Salutes The Jazz Masters (Verve, 1994)

== As sideman ==
Sortable table
Recording date	Leading artist	Album	Label	Year released	Notes
1963–01	Kenny Dorham	The Flamboyan, Queens, NY, 1963	Uptown	2009	Live
1963–01	Kenny Dorham	Una Mas	Blue Note	1964	
1963–05	Grant Green	Am I Blue	Blue Note	1964	
1963?	Antonio Diaz "Chocolaté" Mena	Eso Es Latin Jazz...Man!	Audio Fidelity	1963	1 track solo
1963–07, 1963–08	Johnny Coles	Little Johnny C	Blue Note	1964	
1963–08	Blue Mitchell	Step Lightly	Blue Note	1980	
1963–11	Andrew Hill	Black Fire	Blue Note	1964	
1963–11	Grant Green	Idle Moments	Blue Note	1965	
1963–12	Lee Morgan	The Sidewinder	Blue Note	1964	
1963–12	Bobby Hutcherson	The Kicker	Blue Note	1999	
1964–03	Freddie Roach	Brown Sugar	Blue Note	1964	
1964–03	Andrew Hill	Point of Departure	Blue Note	1965	
1964–06	Horace Silver	Live 1964	Emerald	1984	Live
1964–06	Grant Green	Solid	Blue Note	1979	
1964–08	Kenny Dorham	Trompeta Toccata	Blue Note	1965	
1963–10, 1964–01, 1964–10	Horace Silver	Song for My Father	Blue Note	1965	
1964–11	Duke Pearson	Wahoo!	Blue Note	1965	
1965–02	Andrew Hill	Pax	Blue Note	1975	released in part 1975, as a whole 2006
1965–04	Lee Morgan	The Rumproller	Blue Note	1966	
1965–05	Pete La Roca	Basra	Blue Note	1965	
1965–10	Horace Silver	The Cape Verdean Blues	Blue Note	1966	
1965–11	Larry Young	Unity	Blue Note	1966	
1965–12	Woody Shaw	In the Beginning	Muse	1983	expanded re-issue in 1989 as Cassandranite
1966–02	Joe Zawinul	Money in the Pocket	Atlantic	1966	
1966–02	Nat Adderley	Sayin' Somethin'	Atlantic	1966	
1965–02, 1966–03	Freddie Hubbard	Blue Spirits	Blue Note	1967	
1966–04, 1966–05	Lee Morgan	Delightfulee	Blue Note	1967	
1966–07	Bobby Hutcherson	Stick-Up!	Blue Note	1968	
1966–10	Nat Adderley	Live at Memory Lane	Atlantic	1967	Live
1966	Herbie Hancock	Blow-Up (soundtrack)	MGM	1967	
1966–12	Duke Pearson	Sweet Honey Bee	Blue Note	1967	
1967–01, 1967–03	Roy Ayers	Virgo Vibes	Atlantic	1967	
1967–04	McCoy Tyner	The Real McCoy	Blue Note	1967	
1968–01	Nat Adderley	The Scavenger	Milestone	1968	
1969–04	Herbie Hancock	The Prisoner	Blue Note	1970	
1969–04, 1969–05	George Benson	Tell It Like It Is	A&M/CTI	1969	
1969–10	Miroslav Vitouš	Infinite Search	Embryo	1970	aka Mountain in the Clouds 1972
1969–10, 1969–11, 1969–12	Herbie Hancock	Fat Albert Rotunda	Warner	1969	
1969?	Luis Gasca	The Little Giant	Atlantic	1969	
1969–12, 1970–01	Mose Allison	Hello There, Universe	Atlantic	1970	
1970–01	Alice Coltrane	Ptah, the El Daoud	Impulse!	1970	
1970–01	Freddie Hubbard	Red Clay	CTI	1970	
1970–11	Freddie Hubbard	Straight Life	CTI	1971	
1971–06	Blue Mitchell	Vital Blue	Mainstream	1971	
1971–08	Luis Gasca	For Those Who Chant	Blue Thumb	1972	
1971?	Bill Cosby	Bill Cosby Presents Badfoot Brown and the Bunions Bradford Funeral Marching Band	Uni	1971	
1972–05	Bill Evans / George Russell Orchestra	Living Time	Columbia	1972	
1973?	David Amram	Subway Night	RCA Victor	1973	
1973	Babatunde Olatunji	Soul Makossa	Paramount	1973	
1973–10	Ron Carter	All Blues	CTI	1974	
1973–10, 1973–11	Johnny Hammond	Higher Ground	Kudu	1974	
1973–12	Flora Purim	Butterfly Dreams	Milestone	1973?	
1973	Charles Earland	Leaving This Planet	Prestige	1974	
1973, 1974	Patrice Rushen	Prelusion	Prestige	1974	
1974–04	Luis Gasca	Born to Love You	Fantasy	1974	
1975–02	Kenny Burrell	Ellington Is Forever	Fantasy	1975	
1975–11, 1975–12	Kenny Burrell	Ellington Is Forever Volume Two	Fantasy	1977	
1976?	Coke Escovedo	Comin' at Ya!	Mercury	1976	
1976–03	Roy Ayers	Daddy Bug & Friends	Atlantic	1976	
1975–08– 1976–09	Flora Purim	Encounter	Milestone	1977	
1976–12	Rick Laird	Soft Focus	Timeless	1977	in Netherlands. also from Timeless Muse in U.S..
1977–06, 1977–07	Richard Davis	Fancy Free	Galaxy	1977	
1977–06, 1977–07	Richard Davis	Way Out West	Muse	1980	from the same 2-day session as Fancy Free
1977–07	Roy Haynes	Vistalite	Galaxy	1979	
1977–12	Woody Shaw	Rosewood	Columbia	1978	
1978–03, 1978–04	Freddie Hubbard	Super Blue	Columbia	1978	
1979–03	Ron Carter	Parade	Milestone	1980	
1979–04	Art Farmer	Yama	CTI	1979	
1979?	Jerry Rusch	Rush Hour	Jeru/Inner City	1979	
1979–09	J. J. Johnson	Pinnacles	Milestone	1980	
1979	Joanne Brackeen	Ancient Dynasty	Tappan Zee	1980	
1980	George Gruntz Concert Jazz Band	Live at the "Quartier Latin" Berlin	MPS	1981	Live
1980–09	James Leary	Legacy	Blue Collar	1981	
1981	Chick Corea	Live in Montreux	Stretch	1994	Live
1981	Freddie Hubbard	A Little Night Music	Fantasy	1983	
1981, 1982	Lenny White	Echoes of an Era	Elektra Musician	1982	
1982–01	Mal Waldron	One Entrance, Many Exits	Palo Alto	1983	
1982–04	Lenny White	The Griffith Park Collection 2: In Concert	Elektra Musician	1983	Live
1982–04	Lenny White	Echoes of an Era 2: The Concert	Elektra Musician	1982	Live
1983–01, 1983–04	Dave Friesen	Amber Skies	Palo Alto	1984	
1986–10	Randy Brecker	In the Idiom	Denon	1987	
1987–05	Wynton Marsalis	Thick in the South: Soul Gestures in Southern Blue, Vol. 1	Columbia	1991	
1987–05	Neil Swainson	49th Parallel	Concord	1989	
1987–05	Akio Sasajima	Akio with Joe Henderson	Muse	1988	
1987–10	George Gruntz Concert Jazz Band '87	Happening Now!	HatART	1988	Live
1987–08, 1987–12	Cindy Blackman	Arcane	Muse	1988	
1988–01	Frank Morgan	Reflections	Contemporary	1989	
1988–08	Mulgrew Miller	The Countdown	Landmark	1989	
1988–08	Akio Sasajima	Humpty Dumpty	BRC Jam	1990	
1988–12	Jon Ballantyne	Sky Dance	Justin Time	1989	
1989–06	Charlie Haden	The Montreal Tapes: Tribute to Joe Henderson	Verve	2004	Live
1989–10	Donald Byrd	Getting Down to Business	Landmark	1990	
1989	Rickie Lee Jones	Pop Pop	Geffen	1991	2 tracks
1989, 1990	Bruce Hornsby	A Night on the Town	BMG	1990	2 tracks
1990–02	Renee Rosnes	For the Moment	Blue Note	1990	
1990–05	Ernie Wilkins	Kaleido Duke	Birdology	1994	Live
1990	Kevin Hays	El matador	Evidence	1991	
1991–01	Donald Byrd	A City Called Heaven	Landmark	1991	
1991–02	Rebecca Coupe Franks	Suite of Armor	Justice	1991	
1991–03	Valery Ponomarev	Profile	Reservoir	1991	
1991–04	McCoy Tyner	New York Reunion	Chesky	1991	
1991–08	Walter Norris	Sunburst	Concord	1991	
1991–08	Donald Brown	Cause and Effect	Muse	1992	
1991–09	Todd Coolman	Lexicon	Double-Time	1995	
1991–09	James Williams	James Williams Meets the Saxophone Masters	DIW/Columbia	1992	
1991–09	James Williams	Up to the Minute Blues	DIW	1994	4 tracks
1991–11, 1991–12	Joe Gilman	Treasure Chest	Timeless	1992	
1992?	Kenny Garrett	Black Hope	Warner Bros.	1992	
1992?	Bruce Forman	Forman on the Job	Kamei	1992	4 tracks
1992–12	Mulgrew Miller	Hand in Hand	Novus	1993	
1993–08, 1993–09	Bheki Mseleku	Timelessness	Verve	1994	1 track
1994–01	Roy Hargrove	With the Tenors of Our Time	Verve	1994	2 tracks
1994?	Kitty Margolis	Evolution	Mad-Kat	1994	5 tracks
1995–05	Shirley Horn	The Main Ingredient	Verve	1996	2 tracks
1997–08	Mal Waldron	Soul Eyes	BMG	1997	1 track
1998–03	Terence Blanchard	Jazz in Film	Sony	1999	5 tracks
