= Peace (Horace Silver song) =

Composition by Horace Silver

from the album Blowin' the Blues Away
- Recorded: August 29, 1959
- Studio: Englewood Cliffs, New Jersey, U.S.
- Genre: Jazz
- Label: Blue Note
- Songwriter: Horace Silver
- Producer: Alfred Lion

"Peace" is a composition by jazz pianist Horace Silver which was first recorded on August 29, 1959. It has become a jazz standard. Silver also wrote lyrics for the tune.

== Composition ==
According to Silver, "I was doodlin' around on the piano, and it just came to me, but I also had the impression that there was an angel standing over me, impressing my mind with this beautiful melody and harmony." Unusually for popular Silver compositions, "Peace" is a slow ballad. It has a ten-bar structure. Ted Gioia observed that "You won't find a single catchy melodic motif here, no surprising interlude, no harmonic shift that takes the piece in an unexpected direction. Instead the soloist cycles through a series of gentle resolving chords, mostly following a familiar ii-V formula, before settling unobtrusively into the tonic key of B flat."

== Recordings ==
The piece was first recorded on August 29, 1959, by the Horace Silver Quintet consisting of Silver (piano), Junior Cook (tenor saxophone), Blue Mitchell (trumpet), Gene Taylor (bass), and Louis Hayes (drums). It was released on the Blue Note album Blowin' the Blues Away.

"'Peace' has regularly attracted younger musicians". Silver recorded a version with vocals by Andy Bey on That Healin' Feelin' a decade after the original recording.

== Bibliography ==
- Silver, Horace (2006). Let's Get to the Nitty Gritty: The Autobiography of Horace Silver. University of California Press. ISBN 978-0-520-25392-6.
