= The Thing to Do (album) =

Studio album by Blue Mitchell
- Released: June 1965
- Recorded: July 30, 1964
- Studio: Van Gelder Studio, Englewood Cliffs
- Genre: Jazz
- Length: 40:18
- Label: Blue Note; BST 84178
- Producer: Alfred Lion

Blue Mitchell chronology
Step Lightly (1963)	The Thing to Do (1965)	Down with It! (1965)

The Thing to Do is an album by American trumpeter Blue Mitchell recorded in 1964 and released on the Blue Note label. Chick Corea plays piano on this album, one of his first recordings. This album also features Al Foster's recording debut.

== Reception ==
Professional ratings
Review scores
Source	Rating
Allmusic	5/5 stars

The AllMusic review by Scott Yanow awarded the album 5 stars and stated "The record is prime Blue Note hard bop, containing inventive tunes, meaningful solos, and an enthusiastic but tight feel. Highly recommended".

== Track listing ==
1. "Fungii Mama" (Mitchell) - 7:49
2. "Mona's Mood" (Heath) - 5:18
3. "The Thing to Do" (Heath) - 7:08
4. "Step Lightly" (Henderson) - 10:27
5. "Chick's Tune" (Corea) - 9:36

== Personnel ==
- Blue Mitchell - trumpet
- Junior Cook - tenor saxophone
- Chick Corea - piano
- Gene Taylor - bass
- Al Foster - drums
