= Oh! (ScoLoHoFo album) =

Studio album by ScoLoHoFo
- Released: January 27, 2003 (US) (CD)
- Recorded: July 30–31, 2002
- Studio: Sear Sound (New York City, New York)
- Genre: Jazz
- Label: Blue Note Records
- Producer: Joe Lovano; John Scofield; Dave Holland; Al Foster

Oh! is a studio album by jazz ”super group” ScoLoHoFo, recorded in 2002 & released in 2003 by Blue Note Records. It features electric guitarist John Scofield, tenor saxophonist Joe Lovano, bassist Dave Holland and drummer Al Foster. Lovano had recorded three albums for Blue Note under Scofield's leadership between 1990 and 1993. Scofield, Holland and Foster (who had all worked extensively with Miles Davis) appeared together on Joe Henderson’s album So Near, So Far (Musings for Miles) in 1993. The Oh! album includes original compositions by all four members.

== Reception ==
Professional ratings
Review scores
| Source | Rating |
|---|---|
| AllMusic | 4/5 stars |
| The Penguin Guide to Jazz Recordings | 3.5/4 stars |
| The Guardian | 3/5 stars |

In a review for AllMusic, Matt Collar wrote, "while everyone gets their featured solo spot, the overall effect is one of intensely soft and layered patches of sound... Musically, the goal is resolutely post-bop, but with an acoustic, folky underpining that allows for some interestingly arranged melodic moments."

Jazz Times writer Aaron Steinberg called the album "a well-balanced program of attractive themes-some Latin bits, a few ballads, a few smokers and the requisite blues closer-which give the musicians plenty of harmonic meat to chew on. And what they have they certainly chew up." He concluded: "this unpretentious, intelligent, semicasual throwdown will certainly please anyone who's enjoyed the modern postbop sound that these guys have worked so hard to create."

Michael Pronko, writing for The Japan Times, commented: "The feel of the quartet is one of great intimacy, each member intuitively anticipating each other's every move but also responding to unexpected surprises. Though it’s a studio recording, this sense of being 'live' creates an overall coherence that raises the standards higher for future all-star groups."

In an article for All About Jazz, Terrell Kent Holmes wrote: "Not just a random act of assonance - this disc explores various styles of jazz with brilliant results. From the opening theme of the first cut to Lovano's closing wail at the end, this quartet hits the mark. It may be still very early in 2003, but I'm putting this one on my 'Best Of The Year' list now."

== Track listing ==
1. "Oh!" (Lovano) - 6:23
2. "Right About Now" (Scofield) - 7:31
3. "The Winding Way" (Holland) - 10:38
4. "Bittersweet" (Foster) - 5:29
5. "Shorter Form" (Scofield) - 5:52
6. "New Amsterdam" (Lovano) - 12:22
7. "In Your Arms" (Holland) - 5:49
8. "The Dawn Of Time" (Lovano) - 5:26
9. "Brandyn" (Foster) - 4:34
10. "Faces" (Holland) - 6:49
11. "Oh I See" (Scofield) - 5:54

== Personnel ==
- Joe Lovano – soprano saxophone, tenor saxophone
- John Scofield – guitars
- Dave Holland – bass
- Al Foster – drums

=== Production ===
- Eli Wolf – A&R direction, co-producer
- ScoLoHoFo – producers
- James Farber – engineer, mixing
- Steve Mazur – assistant engineer
- Greg Calbi – mastering at Sterling Sound (New York, NY)
- Mantis Evar – product manager
- Gordon H. Jee – creative direction
- Burton Yount – package design
- Jimmy Katz – photography
- Michael Bourne – liner notes
