= El Barrio =

El Barrio may refer to:

- The Spanish Harlem neighborhood of Manhattan, New York City
- Parts of East Los Angeles
- Wynwood neighborhood of Miami
- Gulfton neighborhood of Houston
- El Barrio (singer), a Spanish flamenco singer
- "El Barrio", a 2016 synthpop song by Eden xo
- A composition by Joe Henderson from the album Inner Urge
- El Barrio FC, a Kings League team
