= Yardbird Suite (disambiguation) =

Yardbird Suite is a composition by jazz saxophonist Charlie Parker

Yardbird Suite may also refer to:

- Yardbird Suite (Herbie Mann album), 1957
- Yardbird Suite (Frank Morgan album), 1998
- Yardbird Suite (jazz club), a jazz club located in Alberta, Canada
