= Mirror Mirror (Joe Henderson album) =

Studio album by Joe Henderson
- Released: 1980
- Recorded: January 1980
- Studio: Studio-Masters in Los Angeles, CA
- Genre: Jazz
- Length: 42:23
- Label: MPS 15541/ Pausa PR7075
- Producer: Joe Henderson

Joe Henderson chronology
Relaxin' at Camarillo (1979)	Mirror Mirror (1980)	The State of the Tenor (1985)

Mirror Mirror is an album by the American jazz saxophonist Joe Henderson, recorded in 1980 and released on the German MPS label. It features pianist Chick Corea, bassist Ron Carter and drummer Billy Higgins.

== Reception ==
The AllMusic review states: "This lesser-known album finds Henderson in typically fine form in an acoustic quartet".

Professional ratings
Review scores
Source	Rating
AllMusic	4/5 stars
The Penguin Guide to Jazz Recordings	3.5/4 stars
The Rolling Stone Jazz Record Guide	3/5 stars

== Track listing ==
1. "Mirror Mirror" (Chick Corea) - 5:53
2. "Candlelight" (Ron Carter) - 6:13
3. "Keystone" (Carter) - 9:40
4. "Joe's Bolero" (Joe Henderson) - 9:43
5. "What's New?" (Johnny Burke, Bob Haggart) - 3:58
6. "Blues for Liebestraum" (Corea) - 7:56

== Personnel ==
- Joe Henderson - tenor saxophone
- Chick Corea - piano
- Ron Carter - bass
- Billy Higgins - drums
