= Silver's Serenade =

Studio album by Horace Silver
- Released: August 1963
- Recorded: May 7–8, 1963
- Studio: Van Gelder, Englewood Cliffs, NJ
- Genre: Jazz
- Length: 37:44
- Label: Blue Note; BST 84131
- Producer: Alfred Lion

Horace Silver chronology
| The Tokyo Blues (1962) | Silver's Serenade (1963) | Song for My Father (1963) |

Silver's Serenade is an album by jazz pianist Horace Silver, released on the Blue Note label in 1963 and featuring performances by Silver with Blue Mitchell, Junior Cook, Gene Taylor, and Roy Brooks.

== Reception ==
Professional ratings
Review scores
| Source | Rating |
|---|---|
| AllMusic | 4/5 stars |
| The Penguin Guide to Jazz | 3/4 stars |
| The Rolling Stone Jazz Record Guide | 3/5 stars |

The AllMusic review awarded the album 4 stars.

== Track listing ==
All compositions by Horace Silver

1. "Silver's Serenade" - 9:21
2. "Let's Get to the Nitty Gritty" - 7:24
3. "Sweet Sweetie Dee" - 7:34
4. "The Dragon Lady" - 7:04
5. "Nineteen Bars" - 6:21

Recorded on May 7 (1, 5) and 8 (2-4), 1963.

== Personnel ==
- Horace Silver - piano
- Blue Mitchell - trumpet
- Junior Cook - tenor saxophone
- Gene Taylor - bass
- Roy Brooks - drums

=== Production ===
- Alfred Lion - production
- Rudy Van Gelder - engineering
- Reid Miles - design
- Francis Wolff - photography
