= Doin' the Thing =

Live album by the Horace Silver Quintet
- Released: 1961
- Recorded: May 19 & May 20, 1961
- Venue: Village Gate, New York City
- Genre: Jazz, hard bop
- Length: 43:39 original LP; 53:56 CD reissue
- Label: Blue Note; BST 84076
- Producer: Alfred Lion

Horace Silver chronology
Horace-Scope (1960)	Doin' the Thing (1961)	The Tokyo Blues (1962)

Doin' the Thing is a live album by jazz pianist Horace Silver, released on the Blue Note label in 1961. It was the only live album released featuring the "classic" Horace Silver Quintet.

The album was recorded at the Village Gate nightclub in New York City and features performances by Silver with Blue Mitchell, Junior Cook, Gene Taylor, and Roy Brooks.

== Reception ==
Professional ratings
Review scores
Source	Rating
AllMusic	4.5/5 stars
The Rolling Stone Jazz Record Guide	4/5 stars

The AllMusic review by Scott Yanow states: "This live set finds pianist/composer Horace Silver and his most acclaimed quintet stretching out". The All About Jazz review of the CD rerelease by Hrayr Attarian called the album "especially unique, not only because of its quality, but because it is the only live recording of his most famous quintet. Recorded in 1961, this CD has the power to transport one back in time to the smoky room at Village Gate where one feels the raw energy of the live performance".

== Track listing ==
All compositions by Horace Silver.

1. "Filthy McNasty" – 11:02
2. "Doin' the Thing" – 11:16
3. "Kiss Me Right" – 9:18
4. "The Gringo/Cool Eyes (The Theme)" – 12:03

Bonus tracks not included on original LP

5. "It Ain't S'posed to Be Like That" – 6:21
6. "Cool Eyes" (complete version) – 3:56

All tracks recorded at the Village Gate, NYC, on May 19 & 20, 1961.

== Personnel ==
- Horace Silver – piano
- Blue Mitchell – trumpet
- Junior Cook – tenor saxophone
- Gene Taylor – bass
- Roy Brooks - drums

Production

- Alfred Lion – production
- Reid Miles – design
- Rudy Van Gelder – engineering
- Jim Marshall – photography
