= Jazz Patterns =

1982 live album by Joe Henderson & Woody Shaw

Live album by Joe Henderson & Woody Shaw
- Released: 1982
- Recorded: September 24–26, 1970
- Venue: Lighthouse Café, Hermosa Beach, California
- Genre: Jazz; modal jazz; post-bop
- Length: 41:45
- Label: Everest; FS 363; Real Gone Music; RGM 1946

Joe Henderson chronology
| Relaxin' at Camarillo (1981) | Jazz Patterns (1982) | The State of the Tenor, Vols. 1 & 2 (1986) |

Woody Shaw chronology
| Master of the Art (1982) | Jazz Patterns (1982) | The Time Is Right (1983) |

Jazz Patterns is an album by saxophonist Joe Henderson and trumpeter Woody Shaw, assembled from previously unreleased tracks of Henderson's Quintet's live recordings for If You're Not Part of the Solution, You're Part of the Problem in September 1970. These outtakes were sold by Milestone Records owner Orrin Keepnews to Everest Records, who released it on their Archive Of Folk & Jazz Music label in 1982. In 2025, the album was remastered and rereleased by Real Gone Music.

== Track listing ==
All tracks are written by Joe Henderson except where noted.

| No. | Title | Writer(s) | Length |
|---|---|---|---|
| 1. | "Invitation" | Bronisław Kaper; Paul Francis Webster | 15:18 |
| 2. | "Punjab" (mislabeled as "Lofty" on 1982 release) | | 9:05 |
| 3. | "Power to the People" (mislabeled as "What's Mine Is Yours" on 1982 release) | | 17:22 |
| Total length: | | | 41:45 |

== Personnel ==
Music

- Joe Henderson – tenor saxophone
- Woody Shaw – trumpet, flugelhorn
- George Cables – electric piano
- Ron McClure – double bass, electric bass
- Lenny White – drums

Technical

- Bernie Grundman – recording
- Kevin Chubirka – remastering (2025)
- Skip Heller – liner notes (2025)

== See also ==
- If You're Not Part of the Solution, You're Part of the Problem
