= Smooth as the Wind =

Studio album by Blue Mitchell
- Released: 1961
- Recorded: December 27, 1960 and March 29 & 30, 1961
- Genre: Jazz
- Length: 40:27
- Label: Riverside
- Producer: Orrin Keepnews

Blue Mitchell chronology
Blue's Moods (1960)	Smooth as the Wind (1961)	A Sure Thing (1962)

Smooth as the Wind is an album by American trumpeter Blue Mitchell with strings and brass recorded in late 1960 and early 1961 and released on the Riverside label.

== Reception ==
Professional ratings
Review scores
Source	Rating
Allmusic	4/5 stars
The Penguin Guide to Jazz Recordings	3/4 stars

The Allmusic review by Scott Yanow awarded the album 4 stars and stated "Trumpeter Blue Mitchell is in excellent form on this very interesting session... The arrangements (seven by Tadd Dameron and three from Benny Golson) are generally quite stimulating, inspiring the trumpeter to come up with many fresh melodic solos... By varying tempos and moods, Dameron and Golson helped create one of the better soloist-with-strings jazz dates".

== Track listing ==
1. "Smooth as the Wind" (Tadd Dameron) - 5:10
2. "But Beautiful" (Johnny Burke, Jimmy Van Heusen) - 3:35
3. "The Best Things in Life Are Free" (Brown, DeSylva, Henderson) 3:18
4. "Peace" (Horace Silver) - 3:53
5. "For Heaven's Sake" (Elise Bretton, Sherman Edwards, Donald Meyer) - 3:32
6. "The Nearness of You" (Hoagy Carmichael, Ned Washington) - 3:22
7. "A Blue Time" (Dameron) - 4:52
8. "Strollin'" (Silver) - 3:16
9. "For All We Know" (J. Fred Coots, Sam M. Lewis) - 3:21
10. "I'm a Fool to Want You" (Joel Herron, Frank Sinatra, Jack Wolf) - 3:37

- Recorded in New York City on December 27, 1960 (tracks 4–6 & 8), and March 29 & 30, 1961 (tracks 1–3, 7, 9 & 10).

== Personnel ==
- Blue Mitchell, Burt Collins, Bernie Glow, Clark Terry - trumpet
- Jimmy Cleveland (tracks 1–3, 7, 9 & 10), Urbie Green (tracks 1–3, 7, 9 & 10), Julian Priester (tracks 4–6 & 8), Britt Woodman (tracks 4–6 & 8) - trombone
- Willie Ruff - French horn
- Tommy Flanagan - piano
- Tommy Williams - bass
- Philly Joe Jones (tracks 1–3, 7, 9 & 10), Charlie Persip (tracks 4–6 & 8) - drums
- Tadd Dameron (tracks 1–3 & 5–8), Benny Golson (tracks 4, 9, & 10) - arrangement
- Unidentified strings: Harry Lookofsky - concertmaster
