= Pressure Cooker (album) =

Studio album by Junior Cook
- Released: 1977
- Recorded: November 1 & 2, 1977
- Studio: Blank Studios, NYC
- Genre: Jazz
- Length: 40:29
- Label: Catalyst; CAT-7628
- Producer: Cedar Walton

Junior Cook chronology
Ichi-Ban (1976)	Pressure Cooker (1977)	Good Cookin' (1979)

Pressure Cooker is an album by saxophonist Junior Cook recorded in 1977 and released on the Catalyst label.

Professional ratings
Review scores
Source	Rating
Allmusic	3/5 stars

== Track listing ==
1. "Sweet Lotus Lips" (Mickey Tucker) – 5:27
2. "The Crucifier" (Tucker) – 4:43
3. "The 8th Cat" (Tex Allen) – 4:54
4. "Not Quite That" (Garnett Brown) – 4:30
5. "Yardbird Suite" (Charlie Parker) – 8:52
6. "Moment to Moment (Part One)" (Henry Mancini) – 3:15
7. "Moment to Moment (Part Two)" (Mancini) – 8:48

== Personnel ==
- Junior Cook – tenor saxophone
- Mickey Tucker – piano
- Juini Booth (tracks 2 & 3), Cecil McBee (tracks 1 & 4–7) – bass
- Leroy Williams – drums
