= In 'n Out =

Studio album by Joe Henderson
- Released: End of January 1965
- Recorded: April 10, 1964
- Studio: Van Gelder Studio, Englewood Cliffs, New Jersey
- Genre: Jazz
- Length: 39:19
- Label: Blue Note; BST 84166
- Producer: Alfred Lion

Joe Henderson chronology
Our Thing (1963)	In 'n Out (1965)	Inner Urge (1966)

Professional ratings
Review scores
Source	Rating
All About Jazz	(favorable)
AllMusic	4.5/5 stars
Down Beat	3/5 stars
The Penguin Guide to Jazz Recordings	3.54 stars
The Rolling Stone Jazz Record Guide	4/5 stars

In 'n Out is the third album by the jazz saxophonist Joe Henderson, released on the Blue Note label. It was recorded on April 10, 1964, and features performances by Henderson with trumpeter Kenny Dorham, pianist McCoy Tyner, bassist Richard Davis and drummer Elvin Jones.

== Reception ==
The AllMusic review by Scott Yanow states that Henderson "has always had the ability to make a routine bop piece sound complex and the most complicated free improvisation seem logical... the music still seems fresh after three decades." The Penguin Guide to Jazz states that "while in general the temperature seems rather lower than on Henderson's other Blue Notes, it's fascinating, profound music."

== Track listing ==
All compositions by Joe Henderson except where noted.

1. "In 'N Out" – 10:23
2. "Punjab" – 9:07
3. "Serenity" – 6:16
4. "Short Story" (Dorham) – 7:10
5. "Brown's Town" (Dorham) – 6:23
6. "In 'N Out" [Alternate Take] – 9:15 Bonus track on CD reissue

== Personnel ==
- Joe Henderson — tenor saxophone
- Kenny Dorham — trumpet
- McCoy Tyner — piano
- Richard Davis — bass
- Elvin Jones — drums
