= Junior's Cookin' =

Studio album by Junior Cook
- Released: 1962
- Recorded: April 10 and December 4, 1961
- Studio: Gold Star (Hollywood, California); Long Beach, California; New York City
- Genre: Jazz
- Length: 38:51
- Label: Jazzland; JLP 58
- Producer: Orrin Keepnews

Junior Cook chronology
| Junior's Cookin' (1962) | Ichi-Ban (1976) |

Junior's Cookin' is the debut album led by American jazz saxophonist Junior Cook which was recorded in 1961 for the Jazzland label.

== Reception ==
Professional ratings
Review scores
| Source | Rating |
|---|---|
| AllMusic | 3.5/5 stars |

The AllMusic review by Jim Todd stated: "The result, while not essential listening, is a satisfying and honest set that provides an appealing portrait of both Cook and Mitchell, two central, although not seminal, figures in the development of hard bop."

== Track listing ==
1. "Myzar" (Roland Alexander) – 7:12
2. "Turbo Village" (Charles Davis) – 5:43
3. "Easy Living" (Ralph Rainger, Leo Robin) – 6:11
4. "Blue Farouq" (Blue Mitchell) – 3:53
5. "Sweet Cakes" (Mitchell) – 5:26
6. "Field Day" (Dolo Coker) – 3:55
7. "Pleasure Bent" (Alexander) – 6:26
- Recorded at Gold Star Studios in Long Beach, California on April 10, 1961 (tracks 4–6) and New York City on December 4, 1961 (tracks 1–3 & 7)

== Personnel ==
- Junior Cook – tenor saxophone
- Blue Mitchell – trumpet
- Ronnie Mathews – piano (tracks 1–3, 7)
- Dolo Coker – piano (tracks 4–6)
- Gene Taylor – bass
- Roy Brooks – drums
