= Boss Horn =

Studio album by Blue Mitchell
- Released: End of October/early November 1967
- Recorded: November 17, 1966
- Studio: Van Gelder Studio, Englewood Cliffs, NJ
- Genre: Jazz
- Length: 38:57
- Label: Blue Note; BST 84257
- Producer: Alfred Lion

Blue Mitchell chronology
Bring It Home to Me (1966)	Boss Horn (1967)	Heads Up! (1967)

Boss Horn is an album by American trumpeter Blue Mitchell recorded in 1966 and released on the Blue Note label.

== Reception ==
Professional ratings
Review scores
Source	Rating
Allmusic	4/5 stars
The Penguin Guide to Jazz Recordings	3/4 stars

The Allmusic review by Matt Collar awarded the album 4 stars and stated "Trumpeter Blue Mitchell delivers a solid hard bop date with his 1966 Blue Note release Boss Horn".

== Track listing ==
1. "Millie" (Pearson) - 6:18
2. "O Mama Enit" (Mitchell) - 5:34
3. "I Should Care" (Sammy Cahn, Axel Stordahl, Paul Weston) - 7:31
4. "Rigor Mortez" (Dave Burns) - 6:21
5. "Tones for Joan's Bones" (Chick Corea) - 6:37
6. "Straight Up and Down" (Chick Corea) - 6:36

== Personnel ==
- Blue Mitchell – trumpet
- Jerry Dodgion – flute, alto saxophone
- Junior Cook – tenor saxophone
- Pepper Adams – baritone saxophone
- Julian Priester – trombone
- Chick Corea (5–6), Cedar Walton (1–4) – piano
- Gene Taylor – bass
- Mickey Roker – drums
- Duke Pearson – arrangement
