= Our Thing (album) =

Studio album by Joe Henderson
- Released: End of May 1964
- Recorded: September 9, 1963
- Studio: Van Gelder Studio, Englewood Cliffs
- Genre: Jazz
- Length: 45:49
- Label: Blue Note; BST 84152
- Producer: Alfred Lion

Joe Henderson chronology
Page One (1963)	Our Thing (1964)	In 'n Out (1964)

Our Thing is the second album by American jazz tenor saxophonist Joe Henderson on Blue Note. It features performances by Henderson, trumpeter Kenny Dorham, pianist Andrew Hill, drummer Pete La Roca and bassist Eddie Khan of originals by Henderson and Dorham. The CD reissue added a bonus take of "Teeter Totter".

== Reception ==
The Allmusic review by Scott Yanow awarded the album 4.5 stars stating "Even at this relatively early stage, Joe Henderson showed his potential as a great tenorman.".

Professional ratings
Review scores
Source	Rating
Allmusic	4.5/5 stars
The Penguin Guide to Jazz Recordings	4/4 stars

== Track listing ==
1. "Teeter Totter" – 8:33 (Henderson)
2. "Pedro's Time" – 10:04 (Dorham)
3. "Our Thing" – 5:36 (Henderson)
4. "Back Road" – 6:19 (Dorham)
5. "Escapade" – 8:05 (Dorham)
6. "Teeter Totter" [alternate take] – 7:10 Bonus track on CD

== Personnel ==
=== Musicians ===
- Joe Henderson – tenor saxophone
- Kenny Dorham – trumpet
- Andrew Hill – piano
- Eddie Khan – bass
- Pete La Roca – drums

=== Production ===
- Bob Blumenthal – liner notes
- Michael Cuscuna – reissue
- Kenny Dorham – liner notes
- Alfred Lion – producer
- Reid Miles – design, cover design
- Rudy Van Gelder – engineer, remastering, digital remastering
- Francis Wolff – photography, cover photo
