= Down with It! =

Studio album by The Blue Mitchell Quintet
- Released: April 1966
- Recorded: July 14, 1965
- Studio: Van Gelder Studio, Englewood Cliffs, NJ
- Genre: Jazz
- Length: 41:34
- Label: Blue Note; BST 84214
- Producer: Alfred Lion

Blue Mitchell chronology
The Thing to Do (1964)	Down with It! (1966)	Bring It Home to Me (1966)

Down with It! is an album by American trumpeter Blue Mitchell, recorded in 1965 and released on the Blue Note label.

== Reception ==
Professional ratings
Review scores
Source	Rating
Allmusic	4/5 stars
The Penguin Guide to Jazz Recordings	3/4 stars

The Allmusic review by Stephen Thomas Erlewine awarded the album 4 stars and stated "the record is so relaxed that it fails to generate much spark, but each the soloists have fine moments that makes the session worthwhile for jazz purists".

== Track listing ==
1. "Hi-Heel Sneakers" (Robert Higginbotham) – 8:23
2. "Perception" (Chick Corea, Blue Mitchell) – 5:41
3. "Alone, Alone, and Alone" (Terumasa Hino) – 7:45
4. "March on Selma" (Mitchell) – 6:16
5. "One Shirt" (William Boone) – 7:30
6. "Samba de Stacy" (Boone) – 5:59

== Personnel ==
- Blue Mitchell – trumpet
- Junior Cook – tenor saxophone
- Chick Corea – piano
- Gene Taylor – bass
- Al Foster – drums
