= Step Lightly =

Studio album by Blue Mitchell
- Released: 1980
- Recorded: August 13, 1963
- Studio: Van Gelder Studio, Englewood Cliffs, NJ
- Genre: Jazz
- Length: 38:14
- Label: Blue Note; LT 1082/BST 84142
- Producer: Alfred Lion

Blue Mitchell chronology
The Cup Bearers (1962)	Step Lightly (1980)	The Thing to Do (1964)

Step Lightly is an album by American trumpeter Blue Mitchell featuring his first session recorded for the Blue Note label in 1963 but not released until 1980.

== Reception ==
Professional ratings
Review scores
Source	Rating
Allmusic	4/5 stars

The Allmusic review by Scott Yanow awarded the album 4 stars and stated "music is consistently excellent... Worth searching for".

== Track listing ==
1. "Mamacita" (Joe Henderson) - 5:49
2. "Sweet and Lovely" (Gus Arnheim, Jules Lemare, Harry Tobias) - 7:45
3. "Andrea" (Roger Boykin) - 5:16
4. "Step Lightly" (Joe Henderson) - 8:32
5. "Cry Me a River" (Arthur Hamilton) - 6:46
6. "Bluesville" (Sonny Red) - 4:07

== Personnel ==
- Blue Mitchell - trumpet
- Leo Wright - alto saxophone
- Joe Henderson - tenor saxophone
- Herbie Hancock - piano
- Gene Taylor - bass
- Roy Brooks - drums
