= Blowin' the Blues Away =

Studio album by the Horace Silver Quintet & Trio
- Released: Early November 1959
- Recorded: August 29–30, 1959; September 13, 1959
- Studios: Van Gelder; Englewood Cliffs, New Jersey
- Genre: Jazz
- Length: 38:13
- Labels: Blue Note; BLP 4017
- Producer: Alfred Lion

Horace Silver chronology
| Finger Poppin' (1959) | Blowin' the Blues Away (1959) | Horace-Scope (1960) |

Blowin' the Blues Away is an album by the Horace Silver Quintet & Trio, recorded at Van Gelder Studio in Englewood Cliffs, New Jersey, on August 29–30 and September 13, 1959, and released on Blue Note later that year. The quintet features horn section Blue Mitchell and Junior Cook and rhythm section Eugene Taylor and Louis Hayes.

== Reception ==
Professional ratings
Review scores
| Source | Rating |
|---|---|
| AllMusic | 4.5/5 stars |
| DownBeat | 5/5 stars |
| The Penguin Guide to Jazz | 4/4 stars |
| The Rolling Stone Jazz Record Guide | 5/5 stars |

In a contemporary review, Ralph J. Gleason called Blowin' the Blue Away a "lovely album" full of "fire and brimstone.... There is an esprit de combo here which is great to find.... We’re going to be playing this one for a long time, I suspect."

The ninth edition of The Penguin Guide to Jazz Recordings places the album among its suggested "Core Collection" of essential recordings, saying that it exemplifies Silver's "virtues as pianist, composer and leader".

The AllMusic review by Steve Huey states, "Blowin' the Blues Away is one of Horace Silver's all-time Blue Note classics... one of Silver's finest albums, and it's virtually impossible to dislike."

== Track listing ==
All tracks are written by Horace Silver, except as noted.

Side 1
| No. | Title | Date recorded | Length |
|---|---|---|---|
| 1. | "Blowin' the Blues Away" | August 29, 1959 | 4:44 |
| 2. | "The St. Vitus Dance" | September 13, 1959 | 4:09 |
| 3. | "Break City" | August 30, 1959 | 4:57 |
| 4. | "Peace" | August 30, 1959 | 6:02 |

Side 2
| No. | Title | Date recorded | Length |
|---|---|---|---|
| 1. | "Sister Sadie" | August 30, 1959 | 6:19 |
| 2. | "The Baghdad Blues" | August 29, 1959 | 4:52 |
| 3. | "Melancholy Mood" | September 13, 1959 | 7:10 |

1999 reissue bonus track
| No. | Title | Writer(s) | Date recorded | Length |
|---|---|---|---|---|
| 8. | "How Did It Happen" | Don Newey | August 30, 1959 | 4:41 |

== Personnel ==
=== August 29–30, 1959 ===
==== The Horace Silver Quintet ====
- Blue Mitchell – trumpet
- Junior Cook – tenor saxophone
- Horace Silver – piano
- Eugene Taylor – bass
- Louis Hayes – drums

=== September 13, 1959 ===
==== The Horace Silver Trio ====
- Horace Silver – piano
- Eugene Taylor – bass
- Louis Hayes – drums

=== Technical personnel ===
- Alfred Lion – production
- Rudy Van Gelder – recording engineer
- Reid Miles – design
- Francis Wolff – photography
- Paula Donohue – cover art
