= The Cup Bearers =

Studio album by Blue Mitchell
- Released: 1962
- Recorded: August 28 & 30, 1962
- Genre: Jazz
- Length: 43:28
- Label: Riverside
- Producer: Orrin Keepnews

Blue Mitchell chronology
A Sure Thing (1962)	The Cup Bearers (1962)	Step Lightly (1963)

The Cup Bearers is an album by American trumpeter Blue Mitchell recorded in 1962 and released on the Riverside label.

Mitchell's group is the Horace Silver Quintet with Cedar Walton on piano in place of Silver.

== Reception ==
Professional ratings
Review scores
Source	Rating
Down Beat	3.5/5 stars
Allmusic	4/5 stars
The Penguin Guide to Jazz Recordings	3/4 stars

The Allmusic review by Scott Yanow awarded the album 4 stars and stated "The music swings hard, mostly avoids sounding like a Horace Silver group, and has particularly strong solos... excellent hard bop".

== Track listing ==
1. "Turquoise" (Cedar Walton) - 5:03
2. "Why Do I Love You?" (Oscar Hammerstein II, Jerome Kern) - 5:28
3. "Dingbat Blues" (Charles Davis) - 5:41
4. "Capers" (Tom McIntosh) - 6:04
5. "The Cup Bearers" (McIntosh) - 6:15
6. "How Deep Is the Ocean?" (Irving Berlin) - 6:43
7. "Tiger Lily" (Thad Jones) - 8:31

- Recorded at Plaza Sound Studios in New York City on August 28 & 30, 1962

== Personnel ==
- Blue Mitchell - trumpet
- Junior Cook - tenor saxophone
- Cedar Walton - piano
- Gene Taylor - bass
- Roy Brooks - drums
