= Somethin's Cookin' =

Studio album by Junior Cook
- Released: 1982
- Recorded: June 12, 1981
- Studio: Van Gelder Studio, Englewood Cliffs, NJ
- Genre: Jazz
- Length: 71:58 CD reissue with bonus tracks
- Label: Muse; MR 5218
- Producer: Cedar Walton

Junior Cook chronology
Good Cookin' (1979)	Somethin's Cookin' (1982)	The Place to Be (1988)

Somethin's Cookin' is an album by saxophonist Junior Cook recorded in 1981 and released on the Muse label.

== Reception ==
Professional ratings
Review scores
Source	Rating
Allmusic	4.5/5 stars

The Allmusic review stated: "The muscular but smooth saxophonist is heard at his best on this Muse quartet release which really showcases his playing".

== Track listing ==
1. "Fiesta Español" (Cedar Walton) – 4:58
2. "Detour Ahead" (Herb Ellis, John Frigo, Lou Carter) – 4:58
3. "Illusion of Grandeur" (Larry Willis) – 9:44
4. "Heavy Blue" (Willis) – 4:10
5. "Hindsight" (Walton) – 5:40
6. "Chi-Chi" (Charlie Parker) – 5:24
7. "Fiesta Español" [alternate take] (Walton) – 4:16 Bonus track on CD reissue
8. "Detour Ahead" [alternate take] (Ellis, Frigo, Carter) – 7:16 Bonus track on CD reissue
9. "Hindsight" [alternate take] (Walton) – 5:52 Bonus track on CD reissue
10. "Chi-Chi" [alternate take] (Parker) – 5:00 Bonus track on CD reissue

== Personnel ==
- Junior Cook – tenor saxophone
- Cedar Walton – piano
- Buster Williams – bass
- Billy Higgins – drums
