= The Tokyo Blues =

Studio album by Horace Silver
- Released: Early November 1962
- Recorded: July 13–14, 1962
- Studio: Van Gelder, Englewood Cliffs
- Genre: Jazz
- Length: 39:52
- Label: Blue Note; BST 84110
- Producer: Alfred Lion

Horace Silver chronology
Doin' the Thing (1961)	The Tokyo Blues (1962)	Silver's Serenade (1963)

Professional ratings
Review scores
Source	Rating
AllMusic	4/5 stars
DownBeat	4/5 stars
The Penguin Guide to Jazz	3.5/4 stars

The Tokyo Blues is an album by jazz pianist Horace Silver, released on the Blue Note label in 1962 and featuring performances by Silver with Blue Mitchell, Junior Cook, Gene Taylor, and Joe Harris (filling in for Roy Brooks). The AllMusic review awarded the album 4 stars.

== Track listing ==
All compositions by Horace Silver except as indicated

1. "Too Much Sake" – 6:45
2. "Sayonara Blues" – 12:12
3. "The Tokyo Blues" – 7:39
4. "Cherry Blossom" (Ronnell Bright) – 6:11
5. "Ah! So" – 7:05

Recorded on July 13 (tracks 2–3) & July 14 (tracks 1 & 4–5), 1962.

== Personnel ==
- Horace Silver – piano
- Blue Mitchell – trumpet (tracks 1–3 & 5)
- Junior Cook – tenor saxophone (tracks 1–3 & 5)
- Gene Taylor – bass
- Joe Harris (credited as "John Harris, Jr.") – drums

Production

- Alfred Lion – production
- Reid Miles – design
- Rudy Van Gelder – engineering
- Francis Wolff – photography
