= You Leave Me Breathless =

Studio album by Junior Cook Quintet
- Released: 1992
- Recorded: December 1991
- Studio: Klampenborg, Denmark
- Genre: Jazz
- Length: 66:11
- Label: SteepleChase; SCCD 31304
- Producer: Nils Winther

Junior Cook chronology
On a Misty Night (1989)	You Leave Me Breathless (1992)

You Leave Me Breathless is the final album led by saxophonist Junior Cook which was recorded in 1991 and released on the SteepleChase label.

== Reception ==
Professional ratings
Review scores
Source	Rating
Allmusic	4.5/5 stars
The Penguin Guide to Jazz Recordings	3/4 stars

The Allmusic review called it a "one of Junior Cook's finest sessions as a leader" stating "Tenor saxophonist Junior Cook's final recording, cut less than two months before his death, finds the veteran hard bop stylist in surprisingly prime form, taking upbeat solos and swinging hard".

== Track listing ==
1. "Junior's Cook" (Junior Cook) – 6:34
2. "Envoy" (Valery Ponomarev) – 8:14
3. "Warm Valley" (Duke Ellington) – 8:59
4. "Sweet Lotus Lips" (Mickey Tucker) – 7:19
5. "Vierd Blues" (Miles Davis) – 9:58
6. "You Leave Me Breathless" (Frederick Hollander) – 12:07
7. "Fiesta Español" (Cedar Walton) – 6:50
8. "Mr. P.C." (John Coltrane) – 5:48

== Personnel ==
- Junior Cook – tenor saxophone
- Valery Ponomarev – trumpet
- Mickey Tucker – piano
- John Webber – bass
- Joe Farnsworth – drums
