= The Kicker (Joe Henderson album) =

Studio album by Joe Henderson
- Released: End of January 1968
- Recorded: August 10, 1967
- Studio: Plaza Sound Studios, New York City
- Genre: Jazz
- Length: 37:54
- Label: Milestone
- Producer: Orrin Keepnews

Joe Henderson chronology
Mode for Joe (1966)	The Kicker (1968)	Tetragon (1968)

Professional ratings
Review scores
Source	Rating
AllMusic	4.5/5 stars
DownBeat	4/5 stars
The Penguin Guide to Jazz Recordings	2.5/4 stars
The Rolling Stone Jazz Record Guide	3/5 stars

The Kicker is the sixth album by jazz tenor saxophonist Joe Henderson, and his first to be released on the Milestone label. It was recorded on August 10, 1967, with one track originating from a later session on September 27, and contains performances by Henderson with trumpeter Mike Lawrence, trombonist Grachan Moncur III, pianist Kenny Barron, bassist Ron Carter and drummer Louis Hayes. The AllMusic review by Scott Yanow states: "Joe Henderson's first recording for Milestone was very much a continuation of the adventurous acoustic music he had recorded previously for Blue Note".

== Track listing ==
All compositions by Joe Henderson except where noted.

1. "Mamacita" – 3:24
2. "The Kicker" – 4:09
3. "Chelsea Bridge" (Strayhorn) – 4:40
4. "If" – 5:37
5. "Nardis" (Davis) – 4:44
6. "Without a Song" (Eliscu, Rose, Youmans) – 6:03
7. "O Amor Em Paz (Once I Loved)" (de Moraes, Gilbert, Jobim) – 5:35
8. "Mo' Joe" – 4:09

- Recorded on August 10 (tracks 1–6 & 8) & September 27 (track 7), 1967

== Personnel ==
- Joe Henderson - tenor saxophone
- Mike Lawrence - trumpet (except track 7)
- Grachan Moncur III - trombone (except track 7)
- Kenny Barron - piano
- Ron Carter - bass
- Louis Hayes - drums
