= On a Misty Night =

Studio album by Junior Cook Quartet
- Released: 1990
- Recorded: June 1989
- Studio: New York City
- Genre: Jazz
- Length: 64:47
- Label: SteepleChase; SCCD 31266
- Producer: Nils Winther

Junior Cook chronology
The Place to Be (1988)	On a Misty Night (1990)	You Leave Me Breathless (1991)

On a Misty Night is an album by saxophonist Junior Cook recorded in 1989 and released on the SteepleChase label.

Professional ratings
Review scores
Source	Rating
AllMusic	4/5 stars
The Penguin Guide to Jazz Recordings	3/4 stars

== Track listing ==
1. "On a Misty Night" (Tadd Dameron) – 6:09
2. "Innocent One" (Mickey Tucker) – 5:53
3. "Wabash" (Cannonball Adderley) – 7:25
4. "You Know Who" (Bertha Hope) – 9:03
5. "Make the Girl Love Me" (Arthur Schwartz, Dorothy Fields) – 10:14
6. "My Sweet Pumpkin" (Ronnell Bright) – 10:15
7. "Nothing Ever Changes" (Jack Segal, Marvin Fisher) – 8:15
8. "I'll Go My Way by Myself" (Schwartz, Howard Dietz) – 7:27

== Personnel ==
- Junior Cook – tenor saxophone
- Mickey Tucker – piano
- Walter Booker – bass
- Leroy Williams – drums
