= Reflections (1989 Frank Morgan album) =

Studio album by Frank Morgan Allstars
- Released: 1989
- Recorded: January 11–12, 1988
- Studio: Fantasy Studios, Berkeley, CA
- Genre: Jazz
- Length: 52:10
- Label: Contemporary; C-14052
- Producer: Orrin Keepnews

Frank Morgan chronology
Yardbird Suite (1988)	Reflections (1989)	Central Avenue Reunion (1989)

Reflections is an album by saxophonist Frank Morgan which was recorded in 1988 and released on the Contemporary label the following year.

== Reception ==
Professional ratings
Review scores
Source	Rating
AllMusic	4/5 stars
The Penguin Guide to Jazz Recordings	3.5/4 stars

The review by AllMusic's Scott Yanow said: "Altoist Frank Morgan leads an all-star group on this excellent hard bop set. ... it is not surprising that Morgan sounds a bit inspired. The musicians all play up to their usual level ... Recommended".

== Track listing ==
1. "Old Bowl, New Grits" (Mulgrew Miller) – 7:37
2. "Reflections" (Thelonious Monk) – 7:16
3. "Starting Over" (Bobby Hutcherson) – 6:09
4. "Black Narcissus" (Joe Henderson) – 6:49
5. "Sonnymoon for Two" (Sonny Rollins) – 9:06
6. "O.K." (Ron Carter) – 6:11
7. "Caravan" (Juan Tizol, Duke Ellington, Irving Mills) – 9:12 Additional track on CD release

== Personnel ==
=== Performance ===
- Frank Morgan – alto saxophone
- Joe Henderson – tenor saxophone
- Bobby Hutcherson – vibes
- Mulgrew Miller – piano
- Ron Carter – bass
- Al Foster – drums

=== Production ===
- Orrin Keepnews – producer
- Danny Kopelson – engineer
