= New York Reunion =

- Artwork shows The Pond and Hallett Nature Sanctuary and the Midtown Manhattan as seen from the Gapstow Bridge

Studio album by McCoy Tyner Quartet
- Released: 1991
- Recorded: April 3–4, 1991
- Studios: RCA Studio A, New York
- Genre: Jazz
- Length: 74:13
- Label: Chesky
- Producer: David Chesky

McCoy Tyner Quartet chronology
Remembering John (1991)	New York Reunion (1991)	44th Street Suite (1991)

Alternative cover
- Advertising the hybrid SACD audiophile quadraphonic DSD mastering released in 2007. The stereo only SACD DSD was released in 2000.

Professional ratings
Review scores
Source	Rating
Allmusic	4.5/5 stars

New York Reunion is a 1991 album by McCoy Tyner released on the Chesky label. It was recorded in April 1991 and features performances by Tyner with tenor saxophonist Joe Henderson, bassist Ron Carter and drummer Al Foster. The AllMusic review by Scott Yanow states that "The advanced hard bop music is as rewarding as one would expect".

== Track listing ==
1. "Recorda Me" (Henderson) - 9:47
2. "Miss Bea (Dedicated to Mother)" (Tyner) - 7:09
3. "What Is This Thing Called Love?" (Porter) - 8:03
4. "My Romance" (Hart, Rodgers) - 6:37
5. "Ask Me Now" (Monk) - 12:11
6. "Beautiful Love" (Gillespie, King, Van Alstyne, Young) - 9:13
7. "A Quick Sketch" (Carter) - 10:36
8. "Home" (Tyner) - 10:58

== Personnel ==
- McCoy Tyner - piano
- Joe Henderson - tenor saxophone
- Ron Carter - bass
- Al Foster - drums
