= Bring It Home to Me =

Studio album by Blue Mitchell
- Released: March 15, 1967
- Recorded: January 6, 1966
- Studio: Van Gelder Studio, Englewood Cliffs, NJ
- Genre: Jazz
- Length: 38:14
- Label: Blue Note; BST 84228
- Producer: Alfred Lion

Blue Mitchell chronology
Down with It! (1965)	Bring It Home to Me (1967)	Boss Horn (1966)

Bring It Home to Me is an album by American trumpeter Blue Mitchell recorded in 1966 and released on the Blue Note label. The albums features mainly blues. An exception is "Portrait of Jennie" (incorrectly titled "Portrait of Jenny" on the album), a ballad originally written for the movie Portrait of Jennie (1948).

== Reception ==
Professional ratings
Review scores
Source	Rating
Allmusic	4/5 stars

The Allmusic review awarded the album 4 stars.

== Track listing ==
All compositions by Blue Mitchell except where noted

1. "Bring It Home to Me" (Jimmy Heath) - 7:58
2. "Blues 3 for 1" - 6:04
3. "Port Rico Rock" (Tom McIntosh) - 6:34
4. "Gingerbread Boy" (Heath) - 6:36
5. "Portrait of Jenny" (Gordon Burdge, J. Russell Robinson) - 5:39
6. "Blue's Theme" - 5:23

== Personnel ==
- Blue Mitchell - trumpet
- Junior Cook - tenor saxophone
- Harold Mabern - piano
- Gene Taylor - bass
- Billy Higgins - drums
