= Heads Up! (Blue Mitchell album) =

Studio album by Blue Mitchell
- Released: December 8, 1968
- Recorded: November 17, 1967
- Studio: Van Gelder Studio, Englewood Cliffs, NJ
- Genre: Jazz
- Length: 36:57
- Label: Blue Note; BST 84272
- Producer: Duke Pearson or Francis Wolff

Blue Mitchell chronology
Boss Horn (1966)	Heads Up! (1968)	Collision in Black (1968)

Heads Up! is an album by American trumpeter Blue Mitchell recorded in 1967 and released on the Blue Note label.

== Reception ==
Professional ratings
Review scores
Source	Rating
Allmusic	3/5 stars

The Allmusic review awarded the album 3 stars.

== Track listing ==
1. "Heads Up! Feet Down!" (Jimmy Heath) - 5:59
2. "Togetherness" (Jimmy Heath) - 6:48
3. "The Folks Who Live On the Hill" (Jerome Kern, Oscar Hammerstein II) - 5:32
4. "Good Humour Man" (Don Pickett) - 5:39
5. "Len Sirrah" (Melba Liston) - 7:19
6. "The People in Nassau" (Blue Mitchell) - 5:40

== Personnel ==
- Blue Mitchell, Burt Collins - trumpet
- Jerry Dodgion - flute, alto saxophone
- Junior Cook - tenor saxophone
- Pepper Adams - baritone saxophone
- Julian Priester - trombone
- McCoy Tyner - piano
- Gene Taylor - bass
- Al Foster - drums
- Jimmy Heath (1–2), Melba Liston (5), Duke Pearson (4, 6), Don Pickett (4) - arrangement
