= Good Cookin' =

Studio album by Junior Cook
- Released: 1980
- Recorded: June 7, 1979
- Studio: Van Gelder Studio, Englewood Cliffs, NJ
- Genre: Jazz
- Length: 37:04
- Label: Muse; MR 5159
- Producer: Fred Seibert

Junior Cook chronology
| Pressure Cooker (1977) | Good Cookin' (1980) | Somethin's Cookin' (1981) |

Good Cookin' is an album by saxophonist Junior Cook recorded in 1979 and released on the Muse label.

== Reception ==
Professional ratings
Review scores
| Source | Rating |
|---|---|
| Allmusic | 4/5 stars |

The Allmusic review called it a "all-star hard-bop cast".

== Track listing ==
All compositions by Slide Hampton except where noted.

1. "J.C." – 7:07
2. "I'm Getting Sentimental Over You" (George Bassman, Ned Washington) – 4:58
3. "Play Together Again" – 5:12
4. "Waltz for Junior" – 7:45
5. "I Waited for You" (Dizzy Gillespie, Gil Fuller) – 4:39
6. "Mood" – 7:23

== Personnel ==
- Junior Cook – tenor saxophone
- Bill Hardman – trumpet, flugelhorn
- Slide Hampton – trombone, arranger
- Mario Rivera – baritone saxophone
- Albert Dailey – piano
- Walter Booker – bass
- Leroy Williams – drums
