= The Place to Be (Junior Cook album) =

Studio album by Junior Cook Quartet
- Released: 1989
- Recorded: November 23, 1988
- Genre: Jazz
- Length: 60:58 CD release with bonus tracks
- Label: SteepleChase; SCS-1240
- Producer: Nils Winther

Junior Cook chronology
Somethin's Cookin' (1981)	The Place to Be (1989)	On a Misty Night (1989)

The Place to Be is an album by saxophonist Junior Cook recorded in 1988 and released on the SteepleChase label.

Professional ratings
Review scores
Source	Rating
AllMusic	3/5 stars
The Penguin Guide to Jazz Recordings	3/4 stars

== Track listing ==
1. "Cedar's Blues" (Cedar Walton) – 5:03
2. "I Should Have Known" (Mickey Tucker) – 11:33
3. "Are You Real" (Benny Golson) – 5:36
4. "She Rote" (Charlie Parker) – 4:32 Bonus track on CD release
5. "Gnid" (Tadd Dameron) – 9:03 Bonus track on CD release
6. "This Is the Place to Be" (Tucker) – 7:50
7. "Over the Rainbow" (Harold Arlen, Yip Harburg) – 8:54
8. "Cup Bearer" (Tom McIntosh) – 8:05

== Personnel ==
- Junior Cook – tenor saxophone
- Mickey Tucker – piano
- Wayne Dockery – bass
- Leroy Williams – drums
