= Mode for Joe =

Studio album by Joe Henderson
- Released: September 1966
- Recorded: January 27, 1966
- Studio: Van Gelder Studio, Englewood Cliffs
- Genre: Jazz, post-bop, modal jazz
- Length: 49:27 (2003 release)
- Label: Blue Note
- Producer: Alfred Lion

Joe Henderson chronology
| Inner Urge (1965) | Mode for Joe (1966) | The Kicker (1967) |

Mode for Joe is the fifth studio album by American jazz saxophonist Joe Henderson, recorded and released in 1966. Featuring Henderson with a larger than usual ensemble consisting of trumpeter Lee Morgan, trombonist Curtis Fuller, vibraphonist Bobby Hutcherson, pianist Cedar Walton, bassist Ron Carter and drummer Joe Chambers, it was Henderson’s last Blue Note recording as leader until the live albums The State of the Tenor, Vols. 1 & 2 almost 20 years later.

== Reception ==
Professional ratings
Review scores
| Source | Rating |
|---|---|
| AllMusic | 4.5/5 stars |
| The Rolling Stone Jazz Record Guide | 4/5 stars |
| The Penguin Guide to Jazz Recordings | 3.5/4 stars |
| DownBeat | 4/5 stars |

AllMusic reviewer Eric Starr awarded the album 4.5 stars, calling it "a great example of modern jazz at its best" and "one of the sax legend's most intriguing albums."

== Track listing ==
All compositions by Joe Henderson, except where indicated.

1. "A Shade of Jade" – 7:08
2. "Mode for Joe" (Cedar Walton) – 8:00
3. "Black" (Walton) – 6:51
4. "Caribbean Fire Dance" – 6:41
5. "Granted" – 7:20
6. "Free Wheelin'" (Lee Morgan) – 6:39
7. "Black" (Walton) (alternate take) – 6:48 Bonus track on CD

== Personnel ==
- Joe Henderson – tenor saxophone
- Lee Morgan – trumpet
- Curtis Fuller – trombone
- Bobby Hutcherson – vibraphone
- Cedar Walton – piano
- Ron Carter – double bass
- Joe Chambers – drums

== Charts ==
Chart performance for Mode for Joe
| Chart (2024) | Peak position |
|---|---|
| Belgian Albums (Ultratop Flanders) | 128 |
