= Forces of Nature: Live at Slugs' =

2024 live album by McCoy Tyner & Joe Henderson

Live album by McCoy Tyner & Joe Henderson
- Released: November 22, 2024
- Recorded: 1966
- Venue: Slugs' Saloon, New York City
- Genre: Jazz; hard bop; modal jazz; avant-garde jazz
- Length: 86:25
- Label: Blue Note
- Producer: Don Was; Jack DeJohnette; Lydia DeJohnette; Zev Feldman

McCoy Tyner chronology
Solo: Live from San Francisco (2009)	Forces of Nature: Live at Slugs' (2024)

Joe Henderson chronology
More from an Evening with Joe Henderson (2009)	Forces of Nature: Live at Slugs' (2024)

Forces of Nature: Live at Slugs' is a live album by pianist McCoy Tyner and saxophonist Joe Henderson, featuring bassist Henry Grimes and drummer Jack DeJohnette. Originally recorded at Slugs' Saloon in New York City in 1966, it was released on November 22, 2024, as an album by Blue Note Records.

== Reception ==
Professional ratings
Review scores
Source	Rating
All About Jazz	4/5 stars
AllMusic	4.5/5 stars

Matt Collar of AllMusic stated: "While this quartet would remain a one-off alliance, their sound has the unified cohesion of a road-tested ensemble, and Forces of Nature is the kind of sonically overwhelming album that leaves you grappling with what you just experienced in the best way." Mike Jurkovic, writing for All About Jazz, complimented the album, which "rewards all expectations and then some", continuing: "It is a crazed charge that the duo mashes with a contagious, barely contained joy and exuberance." In an article for NPR Music, Nate Chinen wrote that the album "captures a moment when post-bop articulacy and avant-garde fervor were in molten dialogue. If it hasn't already, it will cement Joe Henderson's stature as a first-tier tenor saxophone titan, and deepen reverence for McCoy Tyner's genius at the piano."

== Track listing ==
Disc one
No.	Title	Writer(s)	Length
1.	"In 'N Out"	Henderson	26:44
2.	"We'll Be Together Again"	Carl Fischer; Frankie Laine	14:15
Total length:			40:59

Disc two
No.	Title	Writer(s)	Length
3.	"Taking Off"	DeJohnette; Grimes; Henderson; Tyner	28:18
4.	"The Believer"	Tyner	10:05
5.	"Isotope"	Henderson	7:03
Total length:			45:26 86:25

== Personnel ==
Music

- McCoy Tyner – piano
- Joe Henderson – tenor saxophone
- Henry Grimes – double bass
- Jack DeJohnette – drums

Production

- Don Was – executive production
- Francis Wolff (front & back covers), Jan Persson (back cover) – photography
- John Koenig – editing
- Lydia Dejohnette – production
- Matthew Lutthans – mastering (at The Mastering Lab, Salina, KS), liner notes
- Orville O'Brien – engineer
- Todd Gallopo, Tory Davis – package design
- Zak Shelby-Szyszko – associate production, photo research
- Zev Feldman – production, liner notes, photo research
