= Nica's Dream =

Composition by Horace Silver
- Written: 1954
- Recorded: 1956
- Genre: Jazz
- Composer: Horace Silver

"Nica's Dream" is a jazz standard written by pianist Horace Silver in 1954. It is one of many songs written in tribute to jazz patroness Pannonica de Koenigswarter. The song was first recorded by the Jazz Messengers in 1956, and has since been recorded by many other artists. It features jazz melodic minor harmony with prominent minor-major 7th chords. Its first studio recording by Silver was on the album Horace-Scope.

Thomas Owens describes the composition – "The trumpet melody, one of the great themes in jazz literature, is a 64-measure song in AABA form. The accompaniment for the A sections is in a Latin style based on [...] one of Silver's favorite patterns. In the bridge the accompaniment alternates between backbeat chordal punctuations and four-beat swing. During the solos the rhythm section maintains the same accompanimental textures, which both clarify the form and maintain the theme's original moods and textures."

A vocal version was first recorded by Feather in 1983, and released the following year on the album Zanzibar.
