= An Evening with Joe Henderson =

1987 live album by Joe Henderson, Charlie Haden & Al Foster

Live album by Joe Henderson, Charlie Haden & Al Foster
- Released: 1987
- Recorded: July 7, 1987
- Venue: Genova Jazz Festival Villa Imperiale, Italy
- Genre: Jazz
- Length: 47:11
- Label: Red; RR 215
- Producer: Alberto Alberti and Sergio Veschi

Joe Henderson chronology
Akio with Joe Henderson (1987)	An Evening with Joe Henderson (1987)	The Standard Joe (1991)

An Evening with Joe Henderson is a live album by American jazz saxophonist Joe Henderson recorded in Italy in 1987 and released on the Red label. It features Henderson in a trio with bassist Charlie Haden and drummer Al Foster.

== Reception ==
Professional ratings
Review scores
Source	Rating
AllMusic	4/5 stars
The Penguin Guide to Jazz Recordings	3/4 stars

The AllMusic review by Scott Yanow states: "Although Joe Henderson's pianoless trio recordings for Blue Note in 1985 received a fair amount of publicity, this similar date for the Italian Red label has been almost completely overlooked."

== Track listing ==
1. "Ask Me Now" (Thelonious Monk) – 14:23
2. "Serenity" (Joe Henderson) – 8:44
3. "Beatrice" (Sam Rivers) – 10:44
4. "Invitation" (Bronisław Kaper) – 13:20

Three additional tracks from the concert were made available for purchase as digital downloads in 2009 under the title More From An Evening With Joe Henderson. They are as follows:

5. "Visa" (Charlie Parker) – 9:58
6. "Rue Chaptal" (also known as "Royal Roost" and "Tenor Madness"; Fats Navarro, Kenny Clarke) – 7:58
7. "All the Things You Are" (Jerome Kern, Oscar Hammerstein II) – 13:44

== Personnel ==
- Joe Henderson – tenor saxophone
- Charlie Haden – bass
- Al Foster – drums
