= A Sure Thing =

Studio album by Blue Mitchell
- Released: 1962
- Recorded: March 7, 8 & 28, 1962
- Genre: Jazz
- Length: 34:52
- Label: Riverside
- Producer: Orrin Keepnews

Blue Mitchell chronology
Smooth as the Wind (1961)	A Sure Thing (1962)	The Cup Bearers (1962)

A Sure Thing is an album by American trumpeter Blue Mitchell with orchestra recorded in 1962 and released on the Riverside label.

== Reception ==
Professional ratings
Review scores
Source	Rating
Allmusic	4/5 stars
Down Beat	4/5 stars
The Penguin Guide to Jazz Recordings	3.5/4 stars

The Allmusic review by Scott Yanow awarded the album 4 stars and stated "Trumpeter Blue Mitchell is well featured on this CD reissue with a nonet arranged by Jimmy Heath. The music is straightahead but, thanks to Heath's arrangements, sometimes unpredictable".

== Track listing ==
1. "West Coast Blues" (Wes Montgomery) – 5:40
2. "I Can't Get Started" (Vernon Duke, Ira Gershwin) – 3:48
3. "Blue on Blue" (Jimmy Heath) – 4:48
4. "A Sure Thing" (Jerome Kern, Ira Gershwin) – 4:34
5. "Hootie Blues" (Jay McShann) – 5:24
6. "Hip to It" (Blue Mitchell) – 5:00
7. "Gone With the Wind" (Herb Magidson, Allie Wrubel) – 5:57
- Recorded at Plaza Sound Studios in New York City on March 7 (tracks 2 & 5), March 8 (tracks 3 & 4), and March 28 (tracks 1, 6 & 7), 1962

== Personnel ==
- Blue Mitchell, Clark Terry (tracks 1–6) – trumpet
- Jimmy Heath – tenor saxophone, arrangement
- Jerome Richardson (tracks 1–6) – flute, alto saxophone
- Pepper Adams (tracks 2–5), Pat Patrick (tracks 1 & 6) – baritone saxophone
- Julius Watkins (tracks 1–6) – French horn
- Wynton Kelly – piano
- Sam Jones – bass
- Albert Heath – drums
