= Finger Poppin' with the Horace Silver Quintet =

Studio album by the Horace Silver Quintet
- Released: Mid-April 1959
- Recorded: January 31, 1959
- Studio: Van Gelder; Hackensack, New Jersey
- Genre: Hard bop
- Length: 42:52
- Label: Blue Note; BLP 4008
- Producer: Alfred Lion

Horace Silver chronology
Further Explorations (1958)	Finger Poppin' with the Horace Silver Quintet (1959)	Blowin' the Blues Away (1959)

Finger Poppin' with the Horace Silver Quintet is an album by jazz pianist Horace Silver, recorded on January 31, 1959, and released on Blue Note later that year. The quintet features horn section Blue Mitchell and Junior Cook and rhythm section Gene Taylor and Louis Hayes.

== Reception ==
Professional ratings
Review scores
Source	Rating
AllMusic	5/5 stars
The Rolling Stone Jazz Record Guide	5/5 stars

The AllMusic review by Steve Huey states, "Finger Poppin' was the first album Horace Silver recorded with the most celebrated version of his quintet... It's also one of Silver's all-time classics, perfectly blending the pianist's advanced, groundbreaking hard bop style with the winning, gregarious personality conveyed in his eight original tunes. Silver always kept his harmonically sophisticated music firmly grounded in the emotional directness and effortless swing of the blues, and Finger Poppin' is one of the greatest peaks of that approach. A big part of the reason is the chemistry between the group – it's electrifying and tightly knit, with a palpable sense of discovery and excitement at how well the music is turning out... Finger Poppin' is everything small-group hard bop should be, and it's a terrific example of what made the Blue Note label's mainstream sound so infectious."

== Track listing ==
All compositions by Horace Silver

Side 1

1. "Finger Poppin'" – 4:47
2. "Juicy Lucy" – 5:46
3. "Swingin' the Samba" – 5:17
4. "Sweet Stuff" – 5:32

Side 2

1. "Cookin' at the Continental" – 4:54
2. "Come on Home" – 5:30
3. "You Happened My Way" – 5:29
4. "Mellow D" – 5:37

== Personnel ==
The Horace Silver Quintet

- Horace Silver – piano
- Blue Mitchell – trumpet (except "Sweet Stuff")
- Junior Cook – tenor saxophone (except "Sweet Stuff")
- Gene Taylor – bass
- Louis Hayes – drums

Technical personnel

- Alfred Lion – production
- Rudy Van Gelder – recording engineer, mastering
- Reid Miles – design
- Francis Wolff – photography
- Leonard Feather – liner notes
