= Horace-Scope =

Album by Horace Silver

Studio album by Horace Silver
- Released: November 1960
- Recorded: July 8–9, 1960
- Studio: Van Gelder, Englewood Cliffs, NJ
- Genre: Jazz
- Length: 39:13
- Label: Blue Note; BST 84042
- Producer: Alfred Lion

Horace Silver chronology
Blowin' the Blues Away (1959)	Horace-Scope (1960)	Doin' the Thing (1961)

Horace-Scope is an album by jazz pianist Horace Silver, released on the Blue Note label in 1960 and featuring performances by Silver with Blue Mitchell, Junior Cook, Gene Taylor, and Roy Brooks.

== Reception ==
Professional ratings
Review scores
Source	Rating
AllMusic	4/5 stars
The Penguin Guide to Jazz	3/4 stars

Steve Huey, reviewing for AllMusic, described the album as "full of soulful grooves and well-honed group interplay" and ultimately an "eminently satisfying effort".

== Track listing ==
All compositions by Horace Silver except as indicated

1. "Strollin'" - 4:59
2. "Where You At?" - 5:37
3. "Without You" (Don Newey) - 4:50
4. "Horace-Scope" - 4:43
5. "Yeah!" - 6:28
6. "Me and My Baby" - 5:58
7. "Nica's Dream" - 6:48

Recorded July 8 (tracks 1–3) & July 9 (tracks 4–7), 1960.

== Personnel ==
- Horace Silver - piano
- Blue Mitchell - trumpet
- Junior Cook - tenor saxophone
- Gene Taylor - bass
- Roy Brooks - drums

Production

- Alfred Lion - production
- Reid Miles - design
- Rudy Van Gelder - engineering
- Francis Wolff - photography
