= Lush Life: The Music of Billy Strayhorn =

Studio album by Joe Henderson
- Released: 1992
- Recorded: September 3, 6 & 8, 1991
- Studios: Van Gelder Studio, Englewood Cliffs, NJ
- Genre: Jazz
- Length: 61:50
- Label: Verve
- Producers: Richard Seidel, Don Sickler

Joe Henderson chronology
The Standard Joe (1991)	Lush Life: The Music of Billy Strayhorn (1992)	So Near, So Far (Musings for Miles) (1993)

Professional ratings
Review scores
Source	Rating
AllMusic	5/5 stars
The Penguin Guide to Jazz Recordings	3.5/4 stars

Lush Life: The Music of Billy Strayhorn is an album by the jazz saxophonist Joe Henderson. Composed of songs written by Billy Strayhorn, the album was a critical and commercial success, leading to the first of three Grammy Awards Henderson would receive while under contract with Verve Records. The album had sold nearly 90,000 copies at the time of Henderson's death in 2001 and has been re-released by Verve, Polygram, and in hybrid SACD format by Universal. Musicians on the album are trumpeter Wynton Marsalis, pianist Stephen Scott, bassist Christian McBride and drummer Gregory Hutchinson.

== Background ==
Before this record, in March 1991, Henderson had recorded The Standard Joe, with Rufus Reid and Al Foster, produced by Italian label Red Records. Henderson had been featured throughout the late 80s and early 90s on recordings by a number of modern jazz musicians, including Wynton Marsalis, when producer Richard Seidel proposed to him the idea of the tribute album to be released under his own name. The album separated the songwriter from his usual material, which according to The New York Times suited Henderson, highlighting his evolution into "one of jazz's most detailed improvisers". Like The New York Times—which credits the album's producers for understanding jazz culture of 1992, "where challenging acoustic music is both an artistic necessity and a play for a market"—Ink Blot Magazine describes the album's success as largely due to its instrumental combinations; rather than performing with a band, Henderson is featured in solo performance, in duet, in trio, in quartet and quintet. Entertainment Weekly agrees that the idea of highlighting the material by dramatically changing personnel "works without getting gimmicky".

== Critical reception ==
The album was praised on its release by The New York Times as being "as close to artistic genius as jazz gets nowadays". In another article in 2002, the same reviewer described the album as "perfectly produced", "thoughtful, carefully experimental and cross generational". Entertainment Weekly declared Henderson's "originality and sheer strangeness" a match for Strayhorn's compositions, stating that Henderson's "fierce muscularity" counterbalanced "Strayhorn's angst—as exquisitely, in a new way, as Duke Ellington and his orchestra used to". The album comes "highly recommended" by AllMusic, which notes that "it does deserve all of the hype". The Penguin Guide to Jazz Recordings calls the album “a splendid record, which won wide acclaim and sales and brought Joe back to the forefront of jazz attention.”

== Commercial performance and accolades ==
The album went to #1 on the Billboard Top Jazz Albums chart, holding its position at top of the charts for two months. With the track "Lush Life", Henderson received the 1992 Grammy Award for "Best Jazz Instrumental Performance, Soloist".

== Track listing ==
All tracks by Billy Strayhorn except where noted.

1. "Isfahan" (Duke Ellington, Billy Strayhorn) – 5:59
2. "Johnny Come Lately" – 6:30
3. "Blood Count" – 7:19
4. "Rain Check" – 5:54
5. "Lotus Blossom" – 4:31
6. "A Flower is a Lovesome Thing" – 6:58
7. "Take the 'A' Train" – 7:11
8. "Drawing Room Blues" – 7:33
9. "U.M.M.G. (Upper Manhattan Medical Group)" – 5:02
10. "Lush Life" – 5:03

== Personnel ==
=== Performers ===
- Joe Henderson – tenor saxophone
- Wynton Marsalis – trumpet
- Stephen Scott – piano
- Christian McBride – bass
- Gregory Hutchinson – drums

=== Production ===
- William Claxton – photography
- Stanley Crouch – liner notes
- Larry Offsey – design
- Dean Pratt – liner notes
- Susan Ragan – photography
- Richard Seidel – production
- Don Sickler – arranging, production, transcription
- Maureen Sickler – assistant engineering
- Camille Tominaro – production assistance
- Rudy Van Gelder – engineering, digital mastering, mixing, surround mixing, compilation mastering
