= The Montreal Tapes: Tribute to Joe Henderson =

Live album by Charlie Haden

Live album by Charlie Haden
- Released: December 2003
- Recorded: June 30, 1989
- Venue: Quebec, Canada
- Genre: Jazz
- Length: 58:21
- Label: Verve
- Producer: Daniel Vachon and Ruth Cameron

Charlie Haden chronology
In Angel City (1988)	The Montreal Tapes: Tribute to Joe Henderson (2003)	The Montreal Tapes: with Geri Allen and Paul Motian (1990)

The Montreal Tapes: Tribute to Joe Henderson is a live album by the American jazz bassist Charlie Haden with saxophonist Joe Henderson and drummer Al Foster recorded at the Montreal International Jazz Festival in 1989 and released on the Verve label.

== Reception ==
The AllMusic review by Thom Jurek awarded the album 4 stars, stating, "This set is a powerful testament to the inherent musical communication of swing between three fine principals, and one of the best live trio dates issued in years".

Professional ratings
Review scores
Source	Rating
AllMusic	4/5 stars
The Penguin Guide to Jazz Recordings	4/4 stars

== Track listing ==
1. "'Round Midnight" (Thelonious Monk) - 12:00
2. "All the Things You Are (Oscar Hammerstein II, Jerome Kern) - 19:19
3. "In the Moment" (Charlie Haden) - 14:41
4. "Passport" (Charlie Parker) - 20:56
- Recorded at the Festival de Jazz de Montreal in Canada on June 30, 1989

== Personnel ==
- Charlie Haden – bass
- Joe Henderson - tenor saxophone
- Al Foster - drums
