= Power to the People (Joe Henderson album) =

Studio album by Joe Henderson
- Released: 1969
- Recorded: May 23 & 29, 1969
- Studios: Plaza Sound Studios, New York City
- Genres: Jazz, hard bop, post-bop
- Length: 42:27
- Labels: Milestone; MSP 9024
- Producer: Orrin Keepnews

Joe Henderson chronology
Tetragon (1968)	Power to the People (1969)	If You're Not Part of the Solution, You're Part of the Problem (1970)

Professional ratings
Review scores
Source	Rating
AllMusic	4.5/5 stars
All About Jazz	(favorable)
All About Jazz	(favorable)
Pitchfork	9.1/10
The Rolling Stone Jazz Record Guide	3/5 stars

Power to the People is an album by jazz saxophonist Joe Henderson, released on Milestone in 1969. Featuring Henderson with trumpeter Mike Lawrence (on two tracks), pianist Herbie Hancock, bassist Ron Carter and drummer Jack DeJohnette. Hancock's electric piano and Carter's bass guitar are the first electric instruments to appear on a Henderson album.

== Track listing ==
All compositions by Joe Henderson, except where noted.

1. "Black Narcissus" – 4:50
2. "Afro-Centric" – 7:00
3. "Opus One-Point-Five" (Ron Carter) – 4:56
4. "Isotope" – 4:53
5. "Power to the People" – 8:42
6. "Lazy Afternoon" (Moross, Latouche) – 4:33
7. "Foresight and Afterthought (An Impromptu Suite in Three Movements)" – 7:33

Recorded on May 23 (tracks 2, 5) and May 29 (all others), 1969.

== Personnel ==
- Joe Henderson – tenor saxophone
- Mike Lawrence – trumpet (2, 5)
- Herbie Hancock – piano (3, 4, 6), Fender Rhodes (1, 2, 5)
- Ron Carter – double bass (1, 3, 4, 6, 7), electric bass (2, 5)
- Jack DeJohnette – drums
