= The State of the Tenor, Vols. 1 & 2 =

Live album by Joe Henderson
- Released: 1986 (Vol.1), 1987 (Vol.2)
- Recorded: November 14–16, 1985
- Genre: Jazz
- Length: 105:53
- Label: Blue Note
- Producer: Stanley Crouch, Michael Cuscuna

Joe Henderson chronology
Jazz Patterns (1982)	The State of the Tenor, Vols. 1 & 2 (1986)	An Evening with Joe Henderson (1987)

Professional ratings
Review scores
Source	Rating
Allmusic	4.5/5 stars
The Penguin Guide to Jazz Recordings	4/4 stars

The State of the Tenor, Vols. 1 & 2 is a live double album by the American saxophonist Joe Henderson, that was released on Blue Note records in 1986 and 1987. The album features Henderson in a trio with bassist Ron Carter and drummer Al Foster, recorded live at the Village Vanguard. The recording was originally issued on two separate LPs, which did not have the tracks "Stella By Starlight" and "All the Things You Are" included in later releases.

== Reception ==
Allmusic awarded the album with 4.5 stars and its review by Steve Huey states: "It is not only a fine trio outing, but a series of performances in which Henderson strips songs to their essence, turning them into his own vision." The Penguin Guide to Jazz Recordings awarded the album a maximum four stars, and included the album in its suggested “core collection”.

== Track listing ==
1. "Beatrice" (Sam Rivers) – 5:48
2. "Friday the 13th" (Thelonious Monk) – 8:25
3. "Happy Reunion" (Duke Ellington) – 8:39
4. "Loose Change" (Ron Carter) – 7:04
5. "Ask Me Now" (Monk) – 6:06
6. "Isotope" (Joe Henderson) – 10:01
7. "Stella by Starlight" (Victor Young, Ned Washington) – 10:18
8. "Boo Boo's Birthday" (Monk) – 7:19
9. "Cheryl" (Charlie Parker) – 7:41
10. "Y Ya la Quiero" (Henderson) – 6:43
11. "Soulville" (Horace Silver) – 5:38
12. "Portrait" (Charles Mingus, Silver) – 7:05
13. "The Bead Game" (Henderson, Lee Konitz) – 9:45
14. "All the Things You Are" (Oscar Hammerstein II, Jerome Kern) – 9:00

== Personnel ==
- Joe Henderson – tenor saxophone
- Ron Carter – bass
- Al Foster – drums
