= So Near, So Far (Musings for Miles) =

Studio album by Joe Henderson
- Released: February 1993
- Recorded: October 12–14, 1992
- Studio: Power Station, New York City
- Genre: Jazz
- Label: Verve
- Producer: Richard Seidel, Don Sickler

Joe Henderson chronology
| Lush Life: The Music of Billy Strayhorn (1992) | So Near, So Far (Musings for Miles) (1993) | Double Rainbow: The Music of Antonio Carlos Jobim (1995) |

Professional ratings
Review scores
| Source | Rating |
|---|---|
| AllMusic | 4.5/5 stars |
| The Penguin Guide to Jazz Recordings | 4/4 stars |

So Near, So Far (Musings for Miles) is a 1993 album by jazz saxophonist Joe Henderson and is the second of five albums he recorded with Verve Records near the end of his career. The album is a tribute to Miles Davis, who Henderson greatly admired (and with whom he performed for a few weekends in 1967). The songs were written by (or associated with) Davis, and the featured musicians (guitarist John Scofield, bassist Dave Holland and drummer Al Foster) played with Davis earlier in their careers.

== Track listing ==
All compositions by Miles Davis except where noted.

1. "Miles Ahead" (Davis, Gil Evans) – 4:31
2. "Joshua" (Davis, Victor Feldman) – 6:18
3. "Pfrancing (No Blues)" – 8:18
4. "Flamenco Sketches" (Davis, Bill Evans) – 9:37
5. "Milestones" – 5:57
6. "Teo" – 8:56
7. "Swing Spring" – 8:10
8. "Circle" – 6:07
9. "Side Car" – 10:26
10. "So Near, So Far" (Tony Crombie, Bennie Green) – 4:30
- Digitally recorded at Power Station, NYC, October 12–14, 1992.

== Personnel ==
- Joe Henderson – tenor saxophone
- John Scofield – guitar
- Dave Holland – bass
- Al Foster – drums
- Don Sickler, Richard Seidel – producers
- Joe Henderson – co-producer

== Charts ==
| Chart (1993) | Peak position |
|---|---|
| US Top Jazz Albums (Billboard) | 1 |
