= Relaxin' at Camarillo (album) =

Studio album by Joe Henderson
- Released: 1981
- Recorded: August 20 & December 29, 1979 in Los Angeles, CA
- Genre: Jazz
- Length: 45:12
- Label: Contemporary; C 14006
- Producer: John Koenig

Joe Henderson chronology
Mirror Mirror (1980)	Relaxin' at Camarillo (1981)	Jazz Patterns (1982)

Relaxin' at Camarillo is an album by American jazz saxophonist Joe Henderson, recorded in 1979 and released on the Contemporary label. It features Henderson with keyboardist Chick Corea, and two different rhythm sections: bassist Richard Davis and drummer Tony Williams on two tracks, and bassist Tony Dumas and drummer Peter Erskine on the remaining three.

== Reception ==
The AllMusic review states: "This informal session has plenty of fine solos from the two principals and is recommended to fans of advanced hard bop".

Professional ratings
Review scores
Source	Rating
AllMusic	3/5 stars
The Penguin Guide to Jazz Recordings	3.5/4 stars
The Rolling Stone Jazz Record Guide	3/5 stars

== Track listing ==
1. "Y Todavia la Quiero" (Joe Henderson) – 11:42
2. "My One and Only Love" (Robert Mellin, Guy Wood) – 9:59
3. "Crimson Lake" (Chick Corea) – 5:26
4. "Yes, My Dear" (Corea) – 8:44
5. "Relaxin' at Camarillo" (Charlie Parker) – 9:21

== Personnel ==
- Joe Henderson – tenor saxophone
- Chick Corea – piano
- Richard Davis (tracks 3 & 4), Tony Dumas (tracks 1, 2 & 5) – bass
- Peter Erskine (tracks 1, 2 & 5), Tony Williams (Tracks 3 & 4) – drums
