= If You're Not Part of the Solution, You're Part of the Problem =

1970 live album by Joe Henderson

- Photograph by Philip Melnick

Live album by Joe Henderson Quintet
- Released: November 1970
- Recorded: September 24–26, 1970
- Venue: Lighthouse Café, Hermosa Beach
- Genre: Jazz
- Length: 45:15
- Label: Milestone Records
- Producer: Orrin Keepnews

Joe Henderson chronology
Power to the People (1969)	If You're Not Part of the Solution, You're Part of the Problem (1970)	In Pursuit of Blackness (1971)

Professional ratings
Review scores
Source	Rating
AllMusic	Original Release
AllMusic	2004 Reissue
DownBeat	3.5/5 stars
The Penguin Guide to Jazz	2004 Reissue
The Rolling Stone Jazz Record Guide	2/5 stars

If You're Not Part of the Solution, You're Part of the Problem is the eleventh album by American jazz tenor saxophonist Joe Henderson. It was rereleased in 2004 as At the Lighthouse, with an alternative album cover listing the personnel in place of the original title and several extra tracks. Henderson’s live band includes trumpeter Woody Shaw, keyboardist George Cables, bassist Ron McClure, tumbador Tony Waters and drummer Lenny White.

== Reception ==
The AllMusic review by Scott Yanow states that "this live session from the legendary Lighthouse features a particularly strong version of the Joe Henderson Quintet" and contains "excellent remakes of 'Mode for Joe' and 'Blue Bossa' ... and a fine rendition of ''Round Midnight'." The Penguin Guide to Jazz commented that "Henderson and Shaw play some of the leader's choicest compositions in a steaming live showcase, one of the most fondly remembered Henderson albums of the period."

== Track listing ==
=== Original ===
Side A
No.	Title	Writer(s)	Length
1.	"Caribbean Fire Dance"	Joe Henderson	5:38
2.	"'Round Midnight"	Thelonious Monk	9:02
3.	"Mode for Joe"	Cedar Walton	8:34

Side B
No.	Title	Writer(s)	Length
1.	"If You're Not Part of the Solution, You're Part of the Problem"	Henderson	11:29
2.	"Blue Bossa"	Kenny Dorham	9:15
3.	"Closing Theme"	Henderson	0:47

=== Reissue ===
No.	Title	Writer(s)	Length
1.	"Caribbean Fire Dance"	Henderson	5:39
2.	"Recorda-Me" (Bonus track)	Henderson	8:21
3.	"A Shade of Jade" (Bonus track)	Henderson	10:32
4.	"Isotope" (Bonus track)	Henderson	4:32
5.	"'Round Midnight"	Monk	9:03
6.	"Mode for Joe"	Walton	8:34
7.	"Invitation" (Bonus track)	Bronisław Kaper	7:34
8.	"If You're Not Part of the Solution, You're Part of the Problem"	Henderson	11:32
9.	"Blue Bossa"	Dorham	9:47
10.	"Closing Theme"	Henderson	0:46
Total length:			1:16:20

== Personnel ==
- George Cables – electronic piano
- Joe Henderson – tenor saxophone
- Ron McClure – double bass, electric bass
- Woody Shaw – flugelhorn, trumpet
- Tony Waters – congas
- Lenny White – drums
