= Yardbird Suite (Frank Morgan album) =

Studio album by Frank Morgan Quartet
- Released: 1988
- Recorded: January 10 & 11, 1988
- Studio: Fantasy Studios, Berkeley, CA
- Genre: Jazz
- Length: 49:03
- Label: Contemporary; C-14045
- Producer: Orrin Keepnews

Frank Morgan chronology
Major Changes (1987)	Yardbird Suite (1988)	Reflections (1989)

Yardbird Suite is an album by saxophonist Frank Morgan which was recorded in 1988 and released on the Contemporary label.

== Reception ==
Professional ratings
Review scores
Source	Rating
Allmusic	4.5/5 stars
The Penguin Guide to Jazz Recordings	3/4 stars

The review by Allmusic's Scott Yanow said: "Altoist Frank Morgan explores his bebop roots on this infectious set ... Morgan pays tribute to Bird, yet does not copy him (although he has the ability to sometimes sound very similar to Parker). This spontaneous session has its subtle surprises and is often hard-swinging. Recommended".

== Track listing ==
All compositions by Charlie Parker except where noted

1. "Yardbird Suite – 7:55
2. "A Night in Tunisia" (Dizzy Gillespie, Frank Paparelli) – 6:23
3. "Billie's Bounce" – 7:21
4. "Star Eyes" (Gene de Paul, Don Raye) – 7:14
5. "Scrapple from the Apple" – 6:03
6. "Skylark" (Hoagy Carmichael, Johnny Mercer) – 6:43
7. "Cheryl" – 7:49 Additional track on CD release

== Personnel ==
=== Performance ===
- Frank Morgan – alto saxophone
- Mulgrew Miller – piano
- Ron Carter – bass
- Al Foster – drums

=== Production ===
- Orrin Keepnews – producer
- Danny Kopelson – engineer
