= The Standard Joe =

Studio album by Joe Henderson
- Released: 1992
- Recorded: March 26, 1991
- Studio: Sear Sound, New York City
- Genre: Jazz
- Length: 67:52
- Label: Red; RR 123248-2
- Producer: Joe Henderson

Joe Henderson chronology
More from an Evening with Joe Henderson (1974–75)	The Standard Joe (1992)	Lush Life: The Music of Billy Strayhorn (1991)

The Standard Joe is an album by American jazz saxophonist Joe Henderson, recorded in 1991 and released on the Red label. It features Henderson in a trio with bassist Rufus Reid and drummer Al Foster.

== Reception ==
Professional ratings
Review scores
Source	Rating
AllMusic	4/5 stars
The Penguin Guide to Jazz Recordings	3.5/4 stars

The Gazette noted that Henderson "often plays at barely a whisper, his lines eddying off into odd nooks, his phrases ending in little wails or muted honks."

The AllMusic review stated: "This Italian import is particularly recommended to listeners not that familiar with Henderson's playing, for he brings new life to these often overplayed compositions".

== Track listing ==
1. "Blue Bossa" (Kenny Dorham) – 9:16
2. "Inner Urge" (Joe Henderson) – 9:35
3. "Body and Soul" [take 1] (Johnny Green, Frank Eyton, Edward Heyman, Robert Sour) – 12:45
4. "Take the "A" Train" (Billy Strayhorn) – 8:48
5. "'Round Midnight" (Thelonious Monk, Cootie Williams, Bernie Hanighen) – 8:42
6. "Blues in F (In 'n Out)" (Henderson) – 5:20
7. "Body and Soul" [take 2] (Green, Eyton, Heyman, Sour) – 13:26

== Personnel ==
- Joe Henderson – tenor saxophone
- Rufus Reid – bass
- Al Foster – drums
