= Inner Urge (Joe Henderson album) =

Studio album by Joe Henderson
- Released: End of March 1966
- Recorded: November 30, 1964
- Studios: Van Gelder Studio, Englewood Cliffs
- Genres: Post-bop; hard bop; modal jazz
- Length: 43:14
- Labels: Blue Note; BST 84189
- Producer: Alfred Lion

Joe Henderson chronology
In 'n Out (1964)	Inner Urge (1966)	Mode for Joe (1966)

Professional ratings
Review scores
Source	Rating
All About Jazz	(very favorable)
AllMusic	4.5/5 stars
DownBeat	4/5 stars
The Penguin Guide to Jazz	4/4 stars
The Rolling Stone Jazz Record Guide	4/5 stars

Inner Urge is an album by the jazz saxophonist Joe Henderson, released in 1966 via Blue Note Records, his fourth recorded as a leader. It was recorded at the Van Gelder Studio, Englewood Cliffs, New Jersey, on November 30, 1964. Featuring Henderson along with pianist McCoy Tyner and drummer Elvin Jones (both members of the John Coltrane quartet at this time), and bassist Bob Cranshaw (a member of Sonny Rollins' band).

== Compositions ==
Jazz critic Nat Hentoff interviewed Henderson for the album's original liner notes essay, and Henderson described the creative impulses behind several of the songs to Hentoff. The title track, "Inner Urge," which has since become a jazz standard, was a reflection of a time in his life when Henderson was "coping with the anger and frustration that can come of trying to find your way in the maze of New York, and of trying to adjust the pace you have to set in hacking your way in that city in order to just exist." Henderson also told Hentoff that "Isotope" is a tribute to Thelonious Monk and Monk's use of musical humor. Hentoff writes elsewhere in the liner notes that "El Barrio" represents Henderson's attachment to the "Spanish musical ethos", and that the piece was inspired by Henderson reflecting on his childhood in Lima, Ohio. Henderson is quoted as saying that he gave the other musicians "two simple chords, B minor and C major 7 (B phrygian)", and asked them "to play something with a Spanish feeling" while he improvised a melody for the piece.

== Reception ==
In a review on All About Jazz, Norman Weinstein calls Inner Urge Henderson's, "most emotionally urgent album" and the "ultimate showcase of his distinguished career . . . . The album seems like an apotheosis of hard bop, a ruthlessly probing amplification of a typical, hard-blowing, Blue Note bop session, pushing bop formulas as far as they could be pushed. As such, I consider it not only one of the best dozen Blue Note sessions ever released, I hear it as one of the major statements of jazz in the '60s, actually recreating the political, economic, and social realities of the turbulent times more precisely than most recorded music of the '60s in any style. An absolutely essential listen and a major masterpiece."

The Penguin Guide to Jazz described the music as "dark and intense". Heavy metal guitarist Alex Skolnick described Inner Urge as one of his favorite albums.

== Track listing ==
All compositions by Joe Henderson, except where noted.

1. "Inner Urge" – 11:58
2. "Isotope" – 9:15
3. "El Barrio" – 7:15
4. "You Know I Care" (Duke Pearson) – 7:22
5. "Night and Day" (Cole Porter) – 7:24

== Personnel ==
=== Musicians ===
- Joe Henderson – tenor saxophone
- McCoy Tyner – piano
- Bob Cranshaw – bass
- Elvin Jones – drums

=== Recording personnel ===
- Alfred Lion – producer
- Francis Wolff – cover photograph
- Rudy Van Gelder – engineer

== Charts ==
Chart performance for Inner Urge
Chart (2022)	Peak position
Belgian Albums (Ultratop Flanders)	194
Belgian Albums (Ultratop Wallonia)	189
Scottish Albums (Official Charts)	73
