= Blue Mitchell =

American trumpeter and composer (1930–1979)

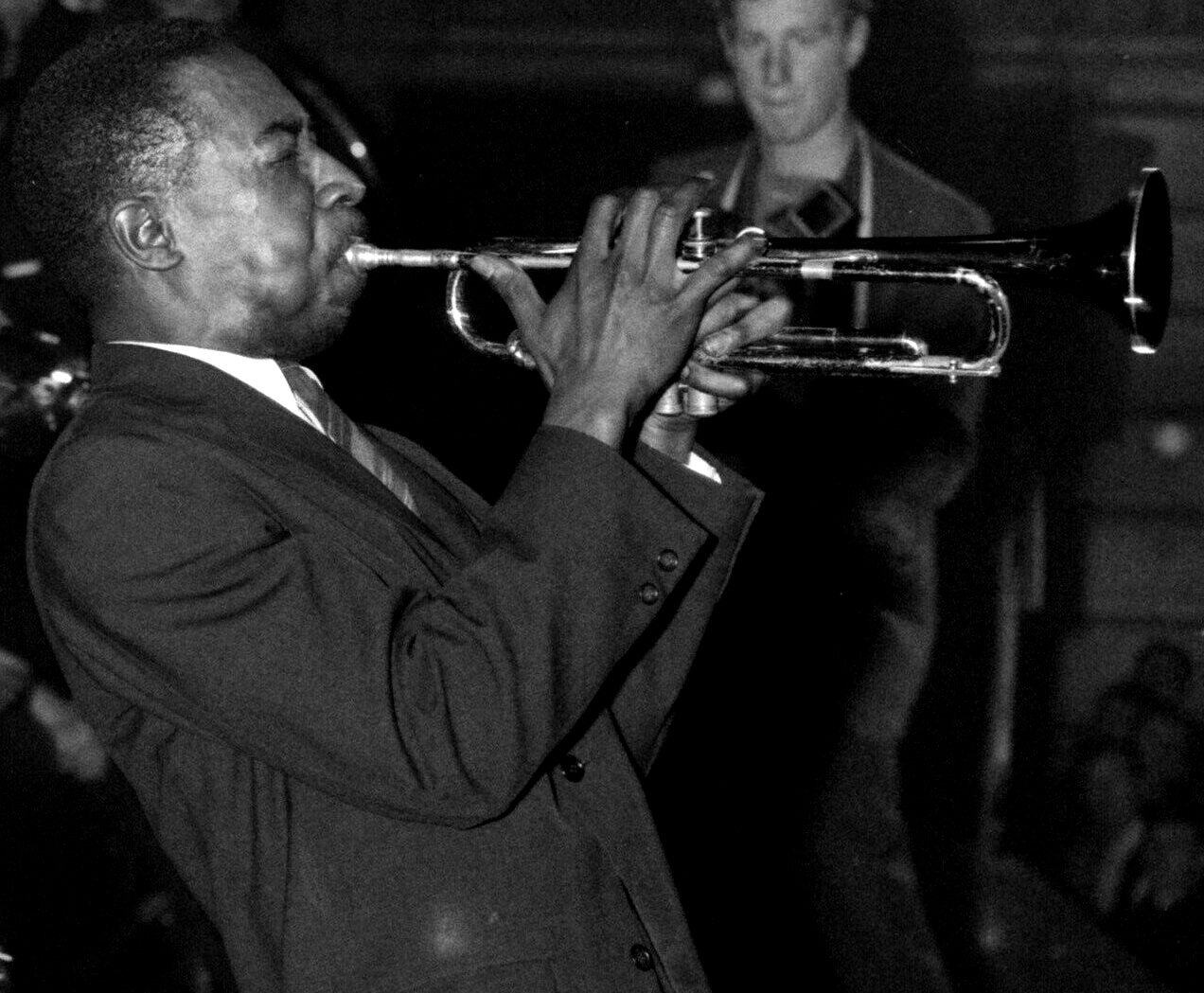
- Mitchell performing at the Concertgebouw, Amsterdam, 1959

Background information
- Born: Richard Allen Mitchell; March 13, 1930; Miami, Florida, U.S.
- Died: May 21, 1979 (aged 49) Los Angeles, California, U.S.
- Genres: Jazz; soul jazz; R&Bsoul; rock; funk
- Occupations: Musician; composer
- Instrument: Trumpet
- Years active: 1951–1979
- Labels: Riverside; Blue Note; Mainstream; RCA; Impulse
- Formerly of: Paul Williams Orchestra; Earl Bostic; Horace Silver Quintet; Ray Charles; John Mayall

Richard Allen "Blue" Mitchell (March 13, 1930 – May 21, 1979) was an American trumpeter and composer who worked in jazz, rhythm and blues, soul, rock, and funk. He recorded albums as leader and sideman for Riverside, Mainstream Records, and Blue Note. He is also credited as the most recorded trumpeter with jazz organ, accumulating 27 sideman recordings in the genre.

== Early life ==
Mitchell was born and raised in Miami, Florida, United States. He began playing the trumpet in high school, aged 17, with the nickname "Blue". His early influences included Dizzy Gillespie, Fatts Navarro, Miles Davis, Kenny Dorham, and Clifford Brown.

== Career ==
After high school, Blue Mitchell began playing with local musicians in Miami. By Sam Jones's telegram request, Mitchell joined the touring Paul Williams Orchestra in Detroit. He later called this his first tour with a professional band. While on tour in 1952, Mitchell passed through New York, where he made his first recordings. These were later released on the compilation album Quartet/Quintet/Sextet by Lou Donaldson. Mitchell remained in New York following the conclusion of the tour and was hired to join Earl Bostic's touring band from 1952 to 1955.

Following his stint with Earl Bostic, in 1955, Blue Mitchell returned to Miami and was heard by saxophonist Cannonball Adderley, a fellow Floridian. Adderley recommended Mitchell to Riverside Records' producer, Orrin Keepnews, who flew to Miami to hear Mitchell perform. Keepnews, impressed, signed Mitchell to record a string of his own albums for Riverside.

Mitchell joined the Horace Silver Quintet in 1958, playing with tenor saxophonist Junior Cook, bassist Gene Taylor, and drummer Louis Hayes, who was later replaced by Roy Brooks. Mitchell stayed with Silver's group until the band's break-up in 1964, after which Mitchell formed a group with members from the Silver quintet, substituting the young pianist Chick Corea for Silver and replacing Brooks with drummer Al Foster. This group produced a number of records for Blue Note Records with some variation in personnel, disbanding in 1969. Mitchell then toured with Ray Charles until 1971.

From 1971 to 1973, Mitchell performed with John Mayall, appearing on Jazz Blues Fusion and subsequent albums. In 1974, he moved to Los Angeles, California. During this period, he recorded and worked as a studio musician in the genres jazz, R&B, soul, rock, and funk, and performed with the big band leaders Louie Bellson, Bill Holman, and Bill Berry, and was the principal soloist for Tony Bennett and Lena Horne.

== Death ==
Mitchell co-led a quintet with saxophonist Harold Land, while in California, until his death from cancer on May 21, 1979, aged 49.

== Discography ==
=== As leader/co-leader ===
| Recording date | Title | Label | Year released | Notes |
|---|---|---|---|---|
| 1958-07 | Big 6 | Riverside | 1958 | |
| 1958-10 | Get Those Elephants Out'a Here | MetroJazz | 1959 | with Red Mitchell, Whitey Mitchell, and André Previn |
| 1959-01 | Out of the Blue | Riverside | 1959 | |
| 1959-09 | Blue Soul | Riverside | 1959 | |
| 1960-08 | Blue's Moods | Riverside | 1960 | |
| 1960-12, 1961-03 | Smooth as the Wind | Riverside | 1961 | |
| 1962-03 | A Sure Thing | Riverside | 1962 | |
| 1962-08 | The Cup Bearers | Riverside | 1962 | |
| 1963-08 | Step Lightly | Blue Note | 1980 | |
| 1964-07 | The Thing to Do | Blue Note | 1965 | |
| 1965-07 | Down with It! | Blue Note | 1966 | |
| 1966-01 | Bring It Home to Me | Blue Note | 1967 | |
| 1966-11 | Boss Horn | Blue Note | 1967 | |
| 1967-11 | Heads Up! | Blue Note | 1968 | |
| 1968-09 | Collision in Black | Blue Note | 1969 | |
| 1969-05 | Bantu Village | Blue Note | 1969 | |
| 1971-03 | Blue Mitchell (a.k.a. Soul Village) | Mainstream | 1971 | |
| 1971-06 | Vital Blue | Mainstream | 1971 | |
| 1972 | Blues' Blues | Mainstream | 1972 | |
| 1972 | The Last Tango = Blues | Mainstream | 1973 | |
| 1973-03-01 | Graffiti Blues | Mainstream | 1973 | |
| 1974 | Many Shades of Blue | Mainstream | 1974 | |
| 1975 | Stratosonic Nuances | RCA | 1975 | |
| 1976 | Funktion Junction | RCA | 1976 | |
| 1977-04-14 | Mapenzi | Concord Jazz | 1977 | with Harold Land |
| 1977-04-28, -29 | Stablemates | Candid | 1977 | |
| 1977 | African Violet | Impulse! | 1978 | |
| 1977 | Summer Soft | Impulse! | 1978 | |

=== As sideman ===
| Year recorded | Leader | Title | Label | Year released |
|---|---|---|---|---|
| 1952–54 | Lou Donaldson | Quartet/Quintet/Sextet | Blue Note | 1957 |
| 1958 | Cannonball Adderley | Portrait of Cannonball | Riverside | 1958 |
| 1959 | Horace Silver | Finger Poppin' | Blue Note | 1959 |
| 1959 | Philly Joe Jones | Drums Around the World | Riverside | 1959 |
| 1959 | Horace Silver | Blowin' the Blues Away | Blue Note | 1959 |
| 1959 | Philly Joe Jones | Showcase | Riverside | 1959 |
| 1959 | Lou Donaldson | The Time Is Right | Blue Note | 1960 |
| 1959–60 | Jackie McLean | Jackie's Bag | Blue Note | 1961 |
| 1960 | Sam Jones | The Soul Society | Riverside | 1960 |
| 1960 | Jimmy Smith | Open House | Blue Note | 1968 |
| 1960 | Jimmy Smith | Plain Talk | Blue Note | 1968 |
| 1960 | Jackie McLean | Capuchin Swing | Blue Note | 1960 |
| 1960 | Charlie Rouse | Takin' Care of Business | Jazzland | 1960 |
| 1960 | Horace Silver | Horace-Scope | Blue Note | 1960 |
| 1960 | Bobby Timmons | Soul Time | Riverside | 1960 |
| 1960 | Jackie McLean & Tina Brooks | Street Singer | Blue Note | 1980 |
| 1960 | Tina Brooks | Back to the Tracks | Blue Note | 1998 |
| 1960 | Sonny Red | Breezing | Jazzland | 1961 |
| 1961 | Sam Jones | The Chant | Riverside | 1961 |
| 1961 | Philly Joe Jones and Elvin Jones | Together! | Atlantic | 1961 |
| 1961 | Horace Silver | Doin' the Thing | Blue Note | 1961 |
| 1961 | Elmo Hope | Homecoming! | Riverside | 1961 |
| 1961 | Junior Cook | Junior's Cookin' | Jazzland | 1961 |
| 1961 | Sonny Red | Images | Jazzland | 1962 |
| 1961 | Les McCann | Les McCann Ltd. in New York | Pacific Jazz | 1962 |
| 1962 | Red Garland | Red's Good Groove | Jazzland | 1962 |
| 1962 | Horace Silver | The Tokyo Blues | Blue Note | 1962 |
| 1962 | Sonny Stitt | Sonny Stitt & the Top Brass | Atlantic | 1963 |
| 1962 | Sam Jones | Down Home | Riverside | 1962 |
| 1963 | Harold Vick | Steppin' Out! | Blue Note | 1963 |
| 1963 | Horace Silver | Silver's Serenade | Blue Note | 1963 |
| 1963 | Stanley Turrentine | A Chip Off the Old Block | Blue Note | 1964 |
| 1963 | Freddie Roach | Good Move! | Blue Note | 1963 |
| 1963–64 | Horace Silver | Song for My Father | Blue Note | 1965 |
| 1964 | Stanley Turrentine | In Memory Of | Blue Note | 1979 |
| 1965 | Big John Patton | Oh Baby! | Blue Note | 1965 |
| 1965 | George Benson | Benson Burner | Columbia | 1967 |
| 1966 | Joe Zawinul | Money in the Pocket | Atlantic | 1966 |
| 1966 | Harold Vick | The Caribbean Suite | RCA Victor | 1967 |
| 1966 | Stanley Turrentine | Rough 'n' Tumble | Blue Note | 1966 |
| 1966 | Richard "Groove" Holmes | Soul Mist! | Prestige | 1970 |
| 1966 | Stanley Turrentine | The Spoiler | Blue Note | 1967 |
| 1967 | Stanley Turrentine | A Bluish Bag | Blue Note | 2007 |
| 1967 | Stanley Turrentine | The Return of the Prodigal Son | Blue Note | 2008 |
| 1967 | Hank Mobley | Hi Voltage | Blue Note | 1968 |
| 1967 | Lou Donaldson | Mr. Shing-A-Ling | Blue Note | 1968 |
| 1968 | Lou Donaldson | Midnight Creeper | Blue Note | 1968 |
| 1968 | Yusef Lateef | The Blue Yusef Lateef | Atlantic | 1968 |
| 1968 | Cedar Walton | Spectrum | Prestige | 1968 |
| 1968 | Don Patterson | Opus De Don | Prestige | 1968 |
| 1968 | Jimmy McGriff | The Worm | Solid State | 1968 |
| 1968 | Lou Donaldson | Say It Loud! | Blue Note | 1969 |
| 1968 | Jimmy McGriff | Step 1 | Solid State | 1969 |
| 1968 | Harold Mabern | Rakin' and Scrapin' | Prestige | 1969 |
| 1969 | Cedar Walton | The Electric Boogaloo Song | Prestige | 1969 |
| 1969 | Charles Kynard | The Soul Brotherhood | Prestige | 1969 |
| 1969 | Jimmy McGriff | A Thing to Come By | Solid State | 1969 |
| 1969 | Jimmy McGriff | Electric Funk | Blue Note | 1970 |
| 1969–70 | Lou Donaldson | Everything I Play Is Funky | Blue Note | 1970 |
| 1970 | Ray Charles | My Kind of Jazz | Tangerine | 1970 |
| 1970 | Grant Green | Green Is Beautiful | Blue Note | 1970 |
| 1970 | Lou Donaldson | Pretty Things | Blue Note | 1970 |
| 1970 | David "Fathead" Newman | Captain Buckles | Cotillion | 1971 |
| 1971 | Stanley Turrentine | The Sugar Man | CTI | 1975 |
| 1971 | John Mayall | Jazz Blues Fusion | Polydor | 1972 |
| 1972 | Papa John Creach | Filthy! | Grunt | 1972 |
| 1972 | John Mayall | Moving On | Polydor | 1972 |
| 1973? | John Mayall | Ten Years Are Gone | Polydor | 1973 |
| 1974 | Louie Bellson | Louie Rides Again! | Percussion Power | 1974 |
| 1975 | Louis Bellson | The Louis Bellson Explosion | Pablo | 1975 |
| 1975 | Bobby Hutcherson | Montara | Blue Note | 1975 |
| 1976 | Carmen McRae | Can't Hide Love | Blue Note | 1976 |
| 1976 | Cedar Walton | Beyond Mobius | RCA | 1976 |
| 1976 | Al Cohn, Dexter Gordon | True Blue | Xanadu | 1976 |
| 1976 | Al Cohn, Dexter Gordon | Silver Blue | Xanadu | 1976 |
| 1976 | Dolo Coker | Dolo! | Xanadu | 1977 |
| 1976 | Dolo Coker | California Hard | Xanadu | 1977 |
| 1974–77 | Sam Jones | Something in Common | Muse | 1977 |
| 1977 | Sam Jones | Changes & Things | Xanadu | 1978 |
| 1978 | Philly Joe Jones | Advance! | Galaxy | 1979 |
| 1978 | Philly Joe Jones | Drum Song | Galaxy | 1985 |
