= Al Foster =

American jazz drummer (1943–2025)

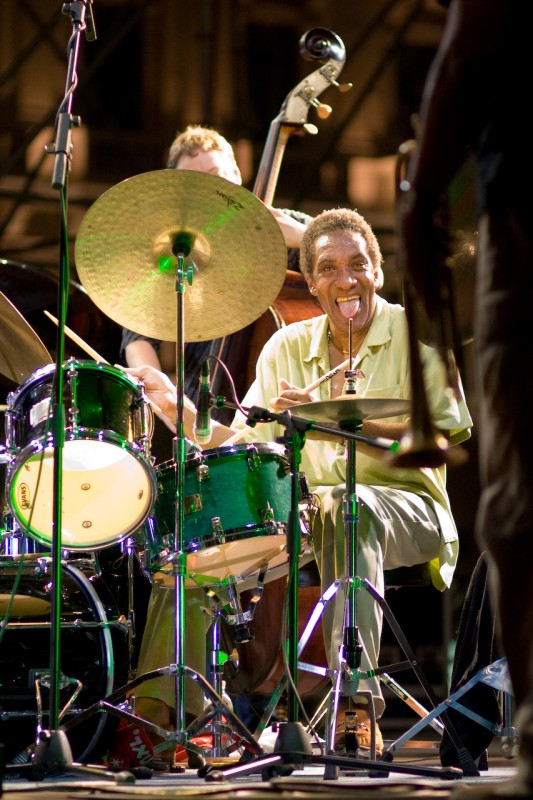
- Al Foster Quintet performing in 2007

Background information
- Born: Aloysius Tyrone Foster; January 18, 1943; Richmond, Virginia, U.S.
- Died: May 28, 2025 (aged 82) New York City, U.S.
- Genre: Jazz
- Occupation: Musician
- Instrument: Drums
- Years active: 1960s–2025
- Website: aloysiusfoster.com

Aloysius Tyrone Foster (January 18, 1943 – May 28, 2025) was an American jazz drummer. Foster's professional career began in the mid-1960s, when he played and recorded with hard bop and swing musicians including Blue Mitchell and Illinois Jacquet. Foster played jazz fusion with Miles Davis during the 70s and was one of the few people to have contact with Davis during his retirement from 1975 to 1980. During Davis's retirement, Foster continued to play and record acoustic jazz with Sonny Rollins, Dexter Gordon, McCoy Tyner, Horace Silver, and other band leaders. Foster played on Miles Davis's 1981 comeback album The Man with the Horn, and was the only musician to play in Davis's band both before, and after, his retirement. After leaving Davis's band in the mid-1980s, Foster toured and recorded with Herbie Hancock, Sonny Rollins, Joe Henderson, and many other band leaders, primarily working in acoustic jazz settings. Foster also released several solo albums under his own name, starting with Mixed Roots in 1978.

== Life and career ==
Foster was born in Richmond, Virginia, United States, and grew up in New York. He began playing drums at the age of 13 and made his recording debut on Blue Mitchell's 1964 album, The Thing to Do, at the age of 20.

He joined Miles Davis's group when Jack DeJohnette left in 1972, and played with Davis until 1985. In his 1989 autobiography, Davis described the first time he heard Foster play live in 1972 at the Cellar Club in Manhattan: "He [Foster] knocked me out because he had such a groove and he would just lay it right in there. That was the kind of thing I was looking for. Al could set it up for everybody else to play off and just keep the groove going forever."

Foster began composing in the 1970s, and toured with his own band, including musicians such as bassist Doug Weiss, saxophonist Dayna Stephens, and pianist Adam Birnbaum. The last decade of his life Foster was frequently at the New York club Smoke whose Smoke Sessions label released his final two albums.

Foster died after an illness on May 28, 2025, at the age of 82.

== Discography ==
=== As leader ===
- Mixed Roots (CBS/Sony, 1978)
- Mr. Foster (Better Days, 1979)
- Brandyn (Laika, 1997)
- Oh! (ScoLoHoFo), with Joe Lovano, John Scofield, Dave Holland (Blue Note, 2003) – recorded in 2002
- Love, Peace and Jazz! Live at the Village Vanguard, with Eli Degibri, Kevin Hays, Doug Weiss (JazzEyes, 2008)
- The Paris Concert (Inakustic, 2008) [DVD-Video]
- Inspirations and Dedications (Smoke Sessions, 2019)
- Reflections (Smoke Sessions, 2022)
- Live at Smoke (Smoke Sessions, 2025)

=== As sideman ===
With Kenny Barron

- Landscape (Baystate, 1985) – recorded in 1984
- Super Standard (Venus, 2004)

With Joanne Brackeen

- Havin' Fun (Concord Jazz, 1985)
- Fi-Fi Goes to Heaven (Concord Jazz, 1987) – recorded in 1986

With Miles Davis

- In Concert: Live at Philharmonic Hall (Columbia, 1973)
- Big Fun (Columbia, 1974)
- Get Up with It (Columbia, 1974)
- Dark Magus (Columbia, 1974)
- Agharta (Columbia, 1975)
- Pangaea (Columbia, 1976)
- The Man with the Horn (Columbia, 1981)
- We Want Miles (Columbia, 1981)
- Star People (Columbia, 1983)
- Decoy (Columbia, 1984)
- You're Under Arrest (Columbia, 1985)
- Amandla (Warner Bros., 1989)
- Miles Davis at Newport 1955–1975: The Bootleg Series Vol. 4 (Columbia Legacy, 2015)

With Tommy Flanagan

- The Magnificent Tommy Flanagan (Progressive, 1981)
- Giant Steps (Enja, 1982)
- Nights at the Vanguard (Uptown, 1986)

With Great Jazz Trio

- Chapter II (East Wind, 1980)

With Joe Henderson

- The State of the Tenor, Vols. 1 & 2 (Blue Note, 1986) – recorded in 1985
- An Evening with Joe Henderson (Red, 1987)
- So Near, So Far (Verve, 1993)

With Duke Jordan

- Duke's Delight (SteepleChase, 1976) – recorded in 1975
- Lover Man (SteepleChase, 1979) – recorded in 1975

With Dave Liebman

- Light'n Up, Please! (Horizon, 1976)
- Pendulum (Artists House, 1978)

With Blue Mitchell

- The Thing to Do (Blue Note, 1964)
- Down with It! (Blue Note, 1965)
- Heads Up! (Blue Note, 1967)

With Frank Morgan

- Yardbird Suite (Contemporary, 1988)
- Reflections (Contemporary, 1989)
- Mood Indigo (Antilles, 1989)

With Art Pepper

- New York Album (Galaxy, 1985) – recorded in 1979
- So in Love (Artists House, 1979)

With Cecil Payne

- Brooklyn Brothers (Muse, 1973) – also with Duke Jordan
- Bird Gets the Worm (Muse, 1976)

With Chris Potter

- Pure (Concord, 1995) – recorded in 1994
- Sundiata (Criss Cross Jazz, 1995) – recorded in 1993

With Sonny Rollins

- Don't Ask (Milestone, 1979)
- Love at First Sight (Milestone, 1980)
- Here's to the People (Milestone, 1991)
- Sonny Rollins + 3 (Milestone, 1995)

With McCoy Tyner

- Horizon (Milestone, 1980) – recorded in 1979
- Quartets 4 X 4 (Milestone, 1980)
- It's About Time with Jackie McLean (Blue Note, 1985)
- New York Reunion (Chesky, 1991)
- McCoy Tyner with Stanley Clarke and Al Foster (Telarc, 2000) – recorded in 1999
- McCoy Tyner Plays John Coltrane (Impulse!, 2001) – recorded in 1997

With Cedar Walton

- Animation (Columbia, 1978) – recorded in 1977-78
- Soundscapes (Columbia, 1980)
- Seasoned Wood (HighNote, 2008)

With Larry Willis

- A New Kind of Soul (LLP, 1970)
- Inner Crisis (Groove Merchant, 1973)
- My Funny Valentine (Jazz City, 1988)
- The Big Push (HighNote, 2006)

With Steve Kuhn

- The Vanguard Date with Ron Carter (Sunnyside/E1, 1986)
- Life's Magic with Ron Carter (Sunnyside/E1, 1986)
- Seasons of Romance (Postcards, 1995)
- Live at Birdland with Ron Carter (Blue Note, 2006)

With others

- George Adams, Paradise Space Shuttle (Timeless, 1979)
- Richie Beirach, Elegie For Bill Evans (Trio, 1981)
- Peter Bernstein, Better Angels (Smoke Sessions, 2024)
- Walter Bishop Jr., Hot House (Muse, 1979) – recorded in 1977-78
- Donald Byrd, Getting Down to Business (Landmark, 1989)
- Eli Degibri, Israeli Song (Anzic, 2010)
- Eliane Elias, Illusions (Denon, 1986)
- Eric Le Lann 4tet with Doug Weiss, David Kikoski (Nocturne, 2007)
- Red Garland, Feelin' Red (Muse, 1978)
- Dexter Gordon, Biting the Apple (SteepleChase, 1976)
- Charlie Haden and Joe Henderson, The Montreal Tapes: Tribute to Joe Henderson (Verve, 2004) – recorded in 1989
- Sadik Hakim, Witches, Goblins, Etc. (1978)
- Roy Hargrove, Diamond in the Rough (Novus/RCA, 1990)
- Jimmy Heath, New Picture (Landmark, 1985)
- Shirley Horn, I Remember Miles (Verve, 1998)
- Bobby Hutcherson, In the Vanguard (Landmark, 1987)
- Illinois Jacquet, The Soul Explosion (Prestige, 1969)
- Sam Jones, Visitation (SteepleChase, 1978)
- Steve Khan, Let's Call This (1991)
- Yusef Lateef, The Doctor is In... and Out (Atlantic, 1976)
- Andy LaVerne and George Mraz, Time Well Spent (1994)
- Abbey Lincoln, People in Me (Philips, 1973)
- Fred Lipsius, Larry Willis and George Mraz, Dreaming of Your Love (MJA, 1995)
- Lonnie Liston Smith, Make Someone Happy (Doctor Jazz, 1986)
- Joe Lovano, Celebrating Sinatra (1996)
- Johnny Lytle, Everything Must Change (1978)
- Phil Markowitz, Sno' Peas (Ken Music, 1991)
- Hugh Masekela, Reconstruction (Uni, 1970)
- Ronnie Mathews, Roots, Branches & Dances (Bee Hive, 1978)
- Tete Montoliu, I Wanna Talk About You (SteepleChase, 1980)
- Sam Morrison, Dune (1976)
- George Mraz, Bottom Lines (1997)
- Mike Nock, In, Out And Around (Timeless, 1978)
- Quest, Quest (Trio [Japan], 1982; Palo Alto 1983) – recorded in 1981
- Bud Shank, This Bud's for You... (Muse, 1985) – recorded in 1984
- Horace Silver, Silver 'n Brass (Blue Note, 1975)
- Reggie Workman, Cerebral Caverns (Postcards, 1995)
- Peter Zak, Paul Gill, Peter Zak Trio (Steeple Chase, 2004) – recorded in 2004
