= Junior Cook =

American saxophonist (1934–1992)

Background information
- Born: Herman Cook; July 22, 1934
- Origin: Pensacola, Florida, U.S.
- Died: February 3, 1992 (aged 57) New York City, U.S.
- Genres: Jazz, hard bop
- Occupation: Musician
- Instruments: Saxophone, flute
- Years active: 1958–1992

Herman "Junior" Cook (July 22, 1934 – February 3, 1992) was an American hard bop tenor saxophone player.

== Biography ==
Cook was born in Pensacola, Florida. A member of a musical family, he started on alto saxophone before switching to tenor during his high school years.

After playing with Dizzy Gillespie in 1958, Cook was a member of the Horace Silver Quintet (1958–1964); when Silver left the group in the hands of Blue Mitchell Cook stayed in the quintet for five more years (1964–1969). Later associations included Freddie Hubbard, Elvin Jones, George Coleman, Louis Hayes (1975–1976), Bill Hardman (1979–1989), and the McCoy Tyner big band.

In addition to many appearances as a sideman, Junior Cook recorded as a leader for Jazzland (1961), Catalyst (1977), Muse, and SteepleChase.

He also taught at Berklee School of Music for a year during the 1970s.

In the early 1990s, Cook was playing with Clifford Jordan, and also leading his own group. His health deteriorated in the late 1980s as a result of cirrhosis and he died in February 1992 in his apartment in New York City, aged 57.

Saxophonist Courtney M. Nero authored Have Horn, Will Travel: The Life and Music of Herman "Junior" Cook, the first full-length biography of Cook's life and career. The book was published in November 2025 by the University of North Texas Press and shed additional light on Cook's beginnings in Pensacola, his pre-Horace Silver career, and his impact on a generation of young jazz musicians in New York City, especially in the 1980s New York City jam session scene.

== Discography ==
=== As leader/co-leader ===
- Junior's Cookin' (Jazzland, 1961)
- Ichi-Ban (Timeless, 1976) with Louis Hayes
- Pressure Cooker (Catalyst, 1977)
- Good Cookin' (Muse, 1979)
- Somethin's Cookin' (Muse, 1981)
- The Place to Be (Steeplechase, 1988)
- On a Misty Night (Steeplechase, 1989)
- You Leave Me Breathless (Steeplechase, 1991)

=== As sideman ===
With Horace Silver

- Live at Newport '58 (Blue Note, 1958 [2008])
- 6 Pieces of Silver (Blue Note, 1956–58)
- Finger Poppin' (Blue Note, 1959)
- Blowin' the Blues Away (Blue Note, 1959)
- Horace-Scope (Blue Note, 1960)
- Doin' the Thing (Blue Note, 1961)
- Paris Blues (Pablo, 1962, [2002])
- The Tokyo Blues (Blue Note, 1962)
- Silver's Serenade (Blue Note, 1963)
- Song for My Father (Blue Note, 1964)
- Music to Ease Your Disease (Silverto, 1988)

With Barry Harris

- Luminescence! (Prestige, 1967)

With Bill Hardman

- Home (Muse, 1978)
- Politely (Muse, 1981 [1982])
- Focus (Muse, 1982)
- What's Up (SteepleChase, 1989)

With Freddie Hubbard

- Sing Me a Song of Songmy (Atlantic, 1971) – co-led with İlhan Mimaroğlu
- Keep Your Soul Together (CTI Records, 1973)
- High Energy (Columbia, 1974)
- Polar AC (CTI Records, 1974)
- Live at Carnegie Hall 1972 (Stepper Music, 2007)

With Clifford Jordan

- Two Tenor Winner (Criss Cross, 1984)
- Play What You Feel (Mapleshade, 1990 [1997])

With Blue Mitchell

- The Cup Bearers (Riverside, 1962)
- The Thing to Do (Blue Note, 1964)
- Down with It! (Blue Note, 1965)
- Bring It Home to Me (Blue Note, 1966)
- Boss Horn (Blue Note, 1966)
- Heads Up! (Blue Note, 1967)

With others

- Kenny Burrell: Swingin' (Blue Note, 1956 [rel. 1980])
- Kenny Burrell: Blue Lights (Blue Note, 1958)
- Dave Bailey Sextet: One Foot in the Gutter (Epic, 1960)
- Roy Brooks: Beat (Jazz Workshop, 1964)
- Cedar Walton: Cedar! (Prestige, 1967)
- John Patton: That Certain Feeling (Blue Note, 1968; Mosaic Select, 2003)
- Don Patterson: Opus De Don (Prestige, 1968)
- Louis Smith: Prancin' (SteepleChase, 1979)
- Mickey Tucker: Sojourn (Xanadu, 1977)
- McCoy Tyner: Uptown/Downtown (Milestone, 1988)
- Walter Bishop Jr.: Hot House (Muse, 1979)
- Louis Hayes: Ichi-Ban (Timeless, 1979)
- Vibration Society Hilton Ruiz Steve Turre: The Music of Rahsaan Roland Kirk (Stash, 1986)
- Larry Gales Sextet: A Message from Monk (Candid, 1990)
- Bertha Hope: Elmo's Fire (Steeplechase, 1991)
