= Gene Taylor (bassist) =

American jazz bassist (1929–2001)

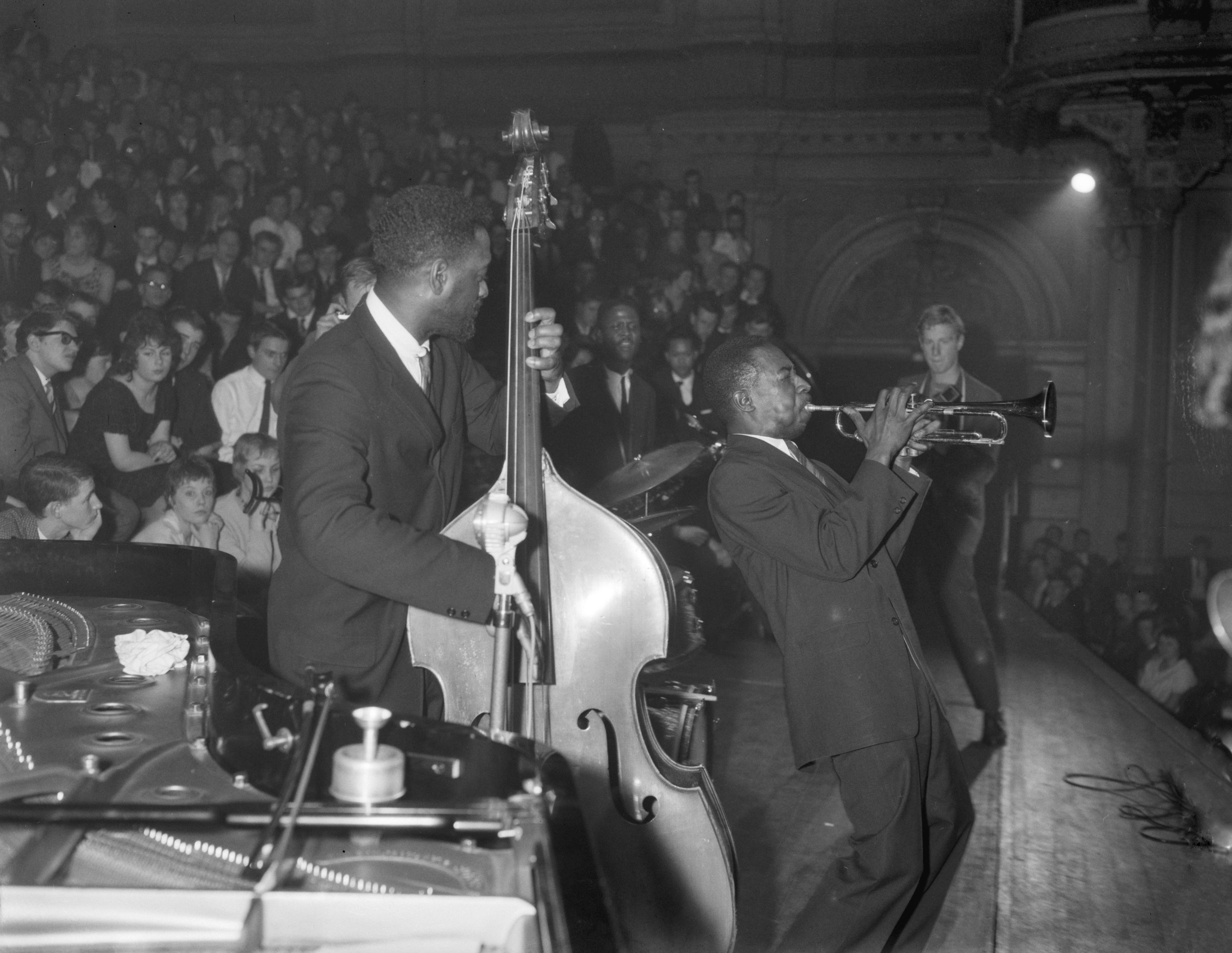
- Gene Taylor and Blue Mitchell at the Concertgebouw, Amsterdam, 1959

Background information
- Born: Calvin Eugene Taylor; March 19, 1929; Toledo, Ohio, U.S.
- Origin: Detroit, Michigan, U.S.
- Died: December 22, 2001 (aged 72) Sarasota, Florida, U.S.
- Genres: Jazz
- Occupations: Musician; songwriter
- Instrument: Double bass
- Years active: 1950s–1970s
- Formerly of: Horace Silver Quintet; Nina Simone; Judy Collins

Calvin Eugene Taylor (March 19, 1929 – December 22, 2001), was an American jazz double bassist. He was born in Toledo, Ohio, United States, and began his career in Detroit, Michigan. Taylor worked with pianist Horace Silver from 1958 until 1963. He then joined trumpeter Blue Mitchell's quintet, with whom he recorded and performed until 1965. From 1966 until 1968, he toured and recorded with Nina Simone. Simone recorded the song "Why? (The King of Love Is Dead)", which Taylor wrote following the assassination of Martin Luther King Jr. Taylor began teaching music in New York public schools. He worked with Judy Collins from 1968 until 1976 and made numerous television appearances accompanying Simone and Collins. He died on December 22, 2001, in Sarasota, Florida, where he had been living since 1990.

== Discography ==
=== As sideman ===
- Roland Alexander, Pleasure Bent (New Jazz, 1961)
- Junior Cook, Junior's Cookin' (Jazzland, 1961)
- Barry Harris, Barry Harris Plays Tadd Dameron (Xanadu, 1975)
- Coleman Hawkins, Supreme (Enja, 1966)
- Eddie Jefferson, Coming Along with Me (OJC, 1969)
- Eric Kloss, Doors (Cobblestone, 1972)
- Junior Mance, Harlem Lullaby (Atlantic, 1967)
- John Wright, The Last Amen (New Jazz, 1961 [1965])

With Blue Mitchell

- The Cup Bearers (Riverside, 1963)
- Step Lightly (Blue Note, 1963)
- Down with It! (Blue Note, 1965)
- Bring It Home to Me (Blue Note, 1966)
- Boss Horn (Blue Note, 1966)
- Heads Up! (Blue Note, 1967)

With Duke Pearson

- Profile (Blue Note, 1959)
- Tender Feelin's (Blue Note, 1959)
- The Right Touch (Blue Note, 1967)

With Horace Silver

- Finger Poppin' (Blue Note, 1959)
- Blowin' the Blues Away (Blue Note, 1959)
- Horace-Scope (Blue Note, 1960)
- The Tokyo Blues (Blue Note, 1962)
- Song for My Father (Blue Note, 1964)
