= Joe Henderson =

American jazz saxophonist (1937–2001)

- Henderson at the Pompei Jazz Festival, 1987

Background information
- Born: April 24, 1937; Lima, Ohio, U.S.
- Died: June 30, 2001 (aged 64) San Francisco, California, U.S.
- Genres: Jazz; jazz fusion; soul jazz
- Occupation: Musician
- Instruments: Tenor saxophone; flute
- Works: Discography
- Years active: 1955–1998
- Labels: Blue Note; Verve; Milestone

Joe Henderson (April 24, 1937 – June 30, 2001) was an American jazz tenor saxophonist and occasional flautist. In a career spanning more than four decades, Henderson played with many of the leading American players of his day and recorded for several prominent labels, including Blue Note, Milestone, Contemporary Records, and Verve.

== Biography ==
=== Early life ===
Born in Lima, Ohio, Henderson was one of 14 children. He was encouraged by his parents, Dennis and Irene (née Farley), and older brother James T. to study music. He dedicated his first album to them "for being so understanding and tolerant" during his formative years. Early musical interests included drums, piano, saxophone and composition. According to the trumpeter Kenny Dorham, two local piano teachers who went to school with Henderson's brothers and sisters, Richard Patterson and Don Hurless, gave him a knowledge of the piano. He was particularly enamored of his brother's record collection.

A hometown drummer, John Jarette, advised Henderson to listen to musicians like Lester Young, Stan Getz, Dexter Gordon and Charlie Parker. He also liked Flip Phillips, Lee Konitz, and the Jazz at the Philharmonic recordings. However, Parker became his greatest inspiration. Henderson's first approach to the saxophone was under the tutelage of Herbert Murphy in high school. During this time, he wrote several scores for the school band.

By age 18, Henderson was active on the Detroit jazz scene of the mid-'50s, playing in jam sessions with visiting New York City stars. While attending classes for flute and bass at Wayne State University, he further developed his saxophone and compositional skills under the guidance of renowned teacher Larry Teal at the Teal School of Music. In late 1959, he formed his first group. By the time he arrived at Wayne State University, he had transcribed and memorized so many Lester Young solos that his professors believed he had perfect pitch. Henderson's college classmates included Yusef Lateef, Barry Harris, and Donald Byrd. He also studied music at Kentucky State College.

Shortly prior to his army induction in 1960, Henderson was commissioned by the United Nations Association in Canada (UNAC) to write some arrangements for the suite Swings and Strings, which was later performed by a ten-member orchestra and the local dance band of Jimmy Wilkins.

=== Early career ===
Henderson spent two years (1960–62) in the U.S. Army: first in Fort Benning, where he competed in an Army talent show and won first place, then in Fort Belvoir, where he was chosen for a world tour, with a show to entertain soldiers. While in Paris, he met Kenny Drew and Kenny Clarke. Then he was sent to Maryland to conclude his enlistment. In 1962, he was finally discharged and promptly moved to New York. He first met trumpeter Kenny Dorham, who provided invaluable guidance, at saxophonist Junior Cook's place. That evening, they went to hear Dexter Gordon at Birdland. Henderson was asked by Gordon to play something with his rhythm section and happily accepted.

Although Henderson's earliest recordings were marked by a strong hard-bop influence, his playing encompassed not only the bebop tradition, but R&B, Latin, and avant-garde as well. He soon joined Horace Silver's band and provided a seminal solo on the jukebox hit "Song for My Father". After leaving Silver's band in 1966, Henderson resumed freelancing and also co-led a big band with Dorham. His arrangements for the band went unrecorded until the release of Big Band (Verve) in 1997.

=== Blue Note recordings ===
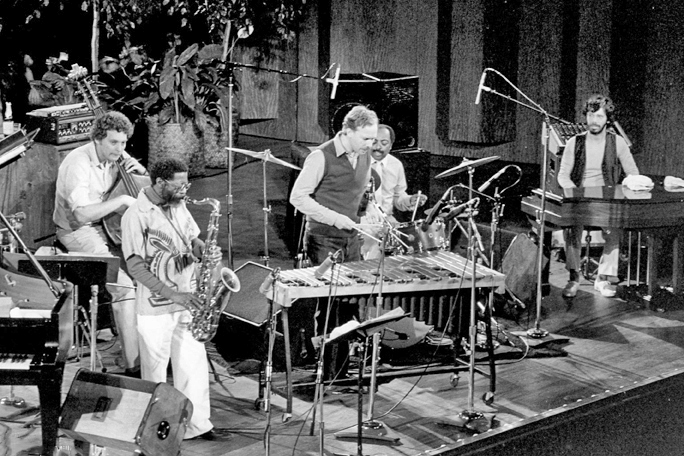
The Roy Haynes Quintet at radio KJAZ Festival, Davies Symphony Hall, San Francisco, 1981. From left: Miroslav Vitouš, Henderson, Gary Burton, Roy Haynes, Chick Corea.

From 1963 to 1968, Henderson appeared on nearly 30 albums for Blue Note, including five released under his name. The recordings ranged from relatively conservative hard-bop sessions (Page One, 1963) to more explorative sessions (Inner Urge and Mode for Joe, 1966). He played a prominent role in many landmark albums under other leaders for the label, including most of Horace Silver's Song for My Father and The Cape Verdean Blues, Grant Green's Idle Moments, Herbie Hancock's The Prisoner, Lee Morgan's The Sidewinder, and "out" albums with pianist Andrew Hill (Black Fire, 1963 and Point of Departure, 1964) and drummer Pete La Roca (Basra, 1965).

In 1967, there was a brief association with Miles Davis's quintet featuring Herbie Hancock, Wayne Shorter, Ron Carter and Tony Williams, although the band was never recorded. Henderson's adaptability and eclecticism would become even more apparent in the years to follow.

=== Milestone Records recordings ===
Signing with Orrin Keepnews's fledgling Milestone label in 1967 marked a new phase in Henderson's career. He co-led the Jazz Communicators with Freddie Hubbard from 1967 to 1968. Henderson was also featured on Hancock's Fat Albert Rotunda for Warner Bros. It was during this time that Henderson began to experiment with jazz-funk fusion, studio overdubbing, and other electronic effects. Song and album titles such as Power to the People, In Pursuit of Blackness, and Black Narcissus reflected his growing political awareness and social consciousness, although Black Narcissus was named after the 1947 Powell and Pressburger film of the same title.

After a brief association with Blood, Sweat & Tears in 1971, Henderson moved to San Francisco. He was still signed to Milestone Records, which had recently moved to San Francisco after being acquired by Fantasy Records. Henderson wanted to be near his label and get out of New York City. Henderson lived in San Francisco for the rest of his life and taught at the San Francisco Conservatory of Music from 1978 to 1982, according to musicologist Joel Geoffrey Harris. The "Joe Henderson Lab" performance space at the San Francisco Jazz Center is named for him.

=== Later career and death ===
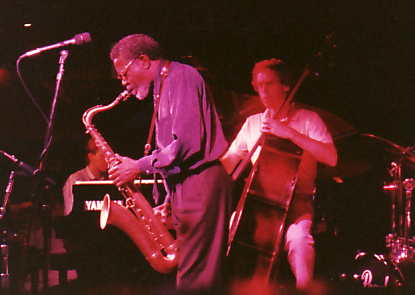
Henderson with Neil Swainson and Jon Ballantyne in 2000

Though he occasionally worked with Echoes of an Era, the Griffith Park Band, and Chick Corea, Henderson remained primarily a leader throughout the 1980s. An accomplished and prolific composer, he began to focus more on reinterpreting standards and his own earlier compositions. Blue Note attempted to position him at the forefront of a resurgent jazz scene in 1986 with the release of the two-volume State of the Tenor, recorded at the Village Vanguard in New York City. The albums (with Ron Carter on bass and Al Foster on drums) revisited the tenor trio form used by Sonny Rollins in 1957 on his own live Vanguard albums for the same label. Henderson established his basic repertoire for the next seven or eight years, with Thelonious Monk's "Ask Me Now" becoming a signature ballad feature. Following his brief return to Blue Note Records, Henderson was signed by the Italian label Red Records, for which he recorded two more albums in the piano-less trio format.

In 1991, Verve records signed Henderson to the label. That January, Henderson made a guest appearance on Stephen Scott's Verve album Something to Consider and worked with Verve producer and vice president Richard Seidel during the session. Henderson and Seidel had first worked together in 1979 while making Henderson's Relaxin' at Camarillo album, which was produced by John Koenig on Contemporary Records. After Verve expressed interest in signing Henderson, the saxophonist had to quickly complete his existing contract with Red Records, which he did by recording The Standard Joe in March 1991. Seidel said in a 2016 interview with musicologist Joel Geoffrey Harris that he decided to offer Henderson a record deal after hearing him perform live at Fat Tuesdays in New York. Seidel served as producer on all five of Henderson's 1990s Verve studio albums. Verve adopted a 'songbook' approach to recording him, coupling it with a considerable marketing and publicity campaign, which more successfully positioned Henderson at the forefront of the contemporary jazz scene. His 1992 'comeback' album, Lush Life: The Music of Billy Strayhorn, was a commercial and critical success, and was followed by tribute albums to Miles Davis, Antônio Carlos Jobim, a big band album, and a jazz adaptation of Porgy and Bess. On March 17th and 18th, 1998, Henderson played tenor saxophone on five tracks recorded for Terence Blanchard's album Jazz in Film, a collection of film scores, including the theme for Taxi Driver and Blanchard's own composition for the Spike Lee film Clockers.

A chain smoker, Henderson died in San Francisco, California, on June 30, 2001, after a long battle with emphysema.
