= Horace Silver discography =

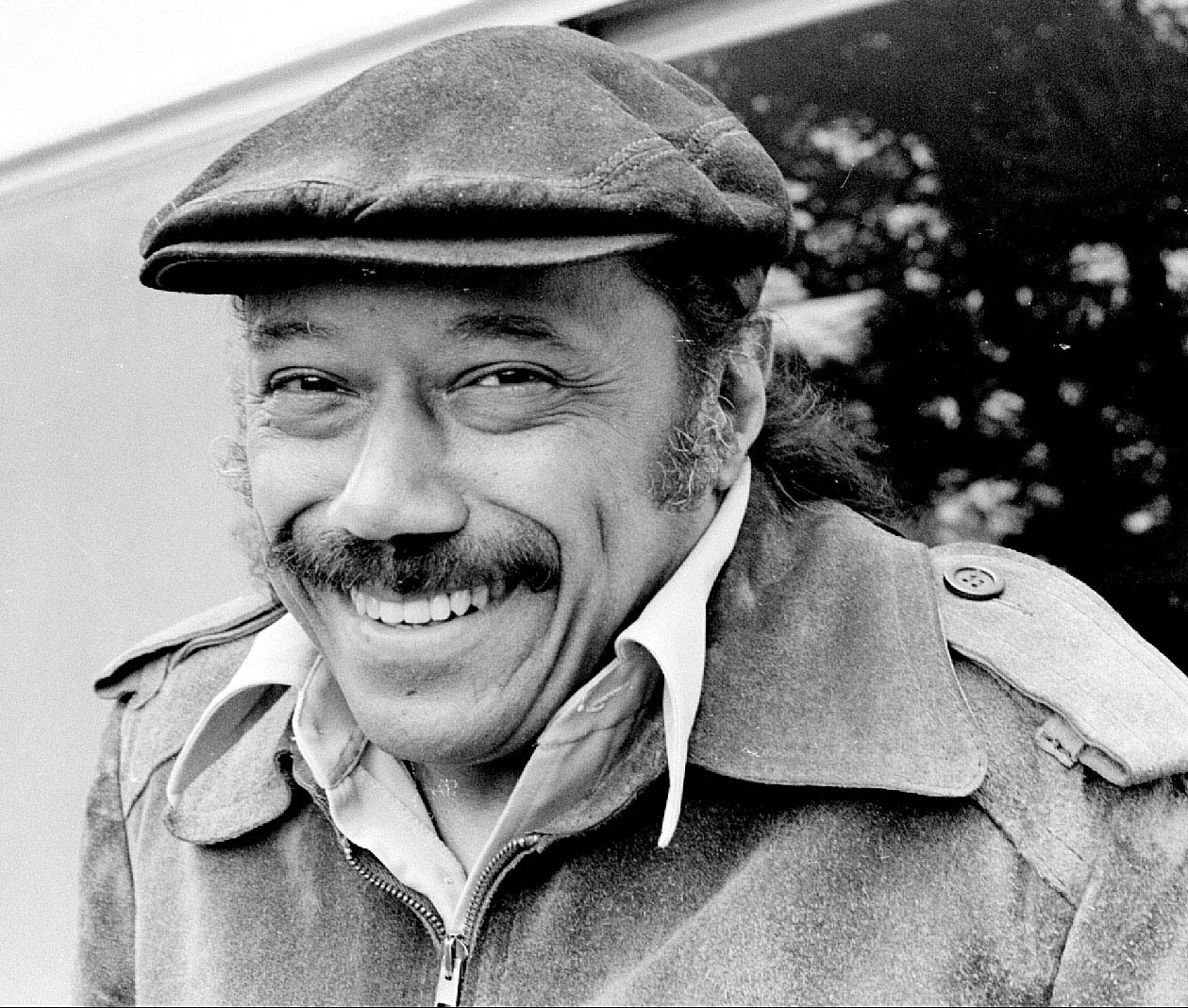
- Silver in 1989
- Studio albums: 36
- Live albums: 3
- Compilation albums: 7

This is a discography of the recordings of Horace Silver (1928–2014), an American hard bop jazz pianist. His major discography consists of 36 studio albums, 3 live albums, and 7 compilations.

Silver was initially a sideman, first recording in 1950, then a leader of mainly small groups. He was a founding member of the Jazz Messengers, originally run cooperatively, later by drummer Art Blakey alone. After leaving the Messengers, Silver led a five-piece combo into the 1980s. The vast majority of Silver's recordings as a leader were for the Blue Note label.

== Studio albums ==
| Album | Album Details | Peak chart positions | | |
| Album | Album Details | US | Top Jazz Albums | Top R&B Albums |
|---|---|---|---|---|
| New Faces New Sounds (Introducing the Horace Silver Trio) | New Faces New Sounds was a common title used by Blue Note for the first albums of Lou Donaldson, Kenny Drew, Elmo Hope, Wynton Kelly, and six others; Released: December 1952; Recorded: October 9 and 20, 1952; Label: Blue Note (BLP 5018); Format: 10-inch LP | — | — | — |
| Horace Silver Quintet | Released: March 1955; Recorded: November 13, 1954; Label: Blue Note (BLP 5058); Format: 10-inch LP | — | — | — |
| Horace Silver Quintet, Vol. 2 | Released: September 1955; Recorded: February 6, 1955; Label: Blue Note (BLP 5062); Format: 10-inch LP | — | — | — |
| Silver's Blue | Released: 1956; Recorded: July 2, 17 and 18, 1956; Label: Epic (LN 3326); Format: LP | — | — | — |
| 6 Pieces of Silver | Released: December 1956; Recorded: November 10, 1956; Label: Blue Note (BLP 1539); Format: LP | — | — | — |
| The Stylings of Silver | Released: July 1957; Recorded: May 8, 1957; Label: Blue Note (BLP 1562); Format: LP | — | — | — |
| Further Explorations | Released: May 1958; Recorded: January 13, 1958; Label: Blue Note (BLP 1589); Format: LP | — | — | — |
| Finger Poppin' with the Horace Silver Quintet | Released: April 1959; Recorded: January 31, 1959; Label: Blue Note (BLP 4008 [Mono], BST 4008 [Stereo]); Format: LP | — | — | — |
| Blowin' the Blues Away | Released: November 1959; Recorded: August 29, 30 and September 13, 1959; Label: Blue Note (BLP 4017 [Mono], BST 84017 [Stereo]); Format: LP | — | — | — |
| Horace-Scope | Released: November 1960; Recorded: July 8 and 9, 1960; Label: Blue Note (BLP 4042 [Mono], BST 84042 [Stereo]); Format: LP | — | — | — |
| The Tokyo Blues | Released: November 1962; Recorded: July 13 and 14, 1962; Label: Blue Note (BLP 4110 [Mono], BST 84110 [Stereo]); Format: LP | — | — | — |
| Silver's Serenade | Released: August 1963; Recorded: May 7 and 8, 1963; Label: Blue Note (BLP 4131 [Mono], BST 84131 [Stereo]); Format: LP | — | — | — |
| Song for My Father | Released: January 1965; Recorded: October 31, 1963; January 28 and October 26, 1964; Label: Blue Note (BLP 4185 [Mono], BST 84185 [Stereo]); Format: LP | 95 | — | 8 |
| The Cape Verdean Blues | Released: January 1966; Recorded: October 1 and 22, 1965; Label: Blue Note (BLP 4220 [Mono], BST 84220 [Stereo]); Format: LP | 130 | — | — |
| The Jody Grind | Released: March 1967; Recorded: November 2 and 23, 1966; Label: Blue Note (BLP 4250 [Mono], BST 84250 [Stereo]); Format: LP | — | 8 | — |
| Serenade to a Soul Sister | Released: June 1968; Recorded: February 23 and March 29, 1968; Label: Blue Note (BLP 4277 [Mono], BST 84277 [Stereo]); Format: LP, 4 Track Cartridge | — | 8 | 41 |
| You Gotta Take a Little Love | Released: June 1969; Recorded: January 10 and 17, 1969; Label: Blue Note (BST 84309); Format: LP | — | — | — |
| That Healin' Feelin'; The United States of Mind Phase 1 | Released: October 1970; Recorded: April 8 and June 18, 1970; Label: Blue Note (BST 84342); Format: LP | — | — | — |
| Total Response; The United States of Mind Phase 2 | Released: April 1972; Recorded: November 15, 1970, and January 29, 1971; Label: Blue Note (BST 84368); Format: LP | — | — | — |
| All; The United States of Mind Phase 3 | Released: September 1972; Recorded: January 17 and February 14, 1972; Label: Blue Note (BST 84420); Format: LP | — | — | — |
| In Pursuit of the 27th Man | Released: March 1973; Recorded: October 6 and November 10, 1972; Label: Blue Note (BN-LA054-F); Format: LP | — | 36 | — |
| Silver 'n Brass | Released: 1975; Recorded: January 10 and 17, 1975; Label: Blue Note (BN-LA406-G); Format: LP, 8 Track Cartridge | — | 15 | — |
| Silver 'n Wood | Released: 1976; Recorded: November 7 and 14, 1975 and January 2 and 3, 1976; Label: Blue Note (BN-LA581-G); Format: LP | — | 35 | — |
| Silver 'n Voices | Released: 1977; Recorded: September 24, October 1, 19 and 22, 1976; Label: Blue Note (BN-LA708-G); Format: LP | — | 39 | — |
| Silver 'n Percussion | Released: 1978; Recorded: November 12, 17, 25 and 30, 1977; Label: Blue Note (BN-LA853-H); Format: LP | — | — | — |
| Silver 'n Strings Play the Music of the Spheres | Released: 1980; Recorded: November 3 and 10, 1978; October 26, November 2 and December 10, 1979; Label: Blue Note (LBW-1033); Format: LP | — | — | — |
| Guides to Growing Up | Released: 1982; Recorded: September 18 and 19, 1981; Label: Silveto (SPR 101); Format: LP | — | — | — |
| Spiritualizing the Senses | Released: 1983; Recorded: January 19, 1983; Label: Silveto (SPR 102); Format: LP | — | — | — |
| There's No Need to Struggle | Released: 1984; Recorded: September 1, 1983; Label: Silveto (SPR 103); Format: LP | — | — | — |
| The Continuity of Spirit | Released: 1985; Recorded: March 25, 1985; Label: Silveto (SPR 104); Format: LP | — | — | — |
| Music to Ease Your Disease | Released: 1988; Recorded: March 31, 1988; Label: Silveto (SPR 105); Format: LP | — | — | — |
| It's Got to Be Funky | Released: 1993; Recorded: February 8 and 9, 1993; Label: Columbia (CK 53812); Format: CD | — | 2 | — |
| Pencil Packin' Papa | Released: 1994; Recorded: January 10 and 11, 1994; Label: Columbia (CK 64210); Format: CD | — | — | — |
| The Hardbop Grandpop | Released: 1996; Recorded: February 29 and March 1, 1996; Label: Impulse! (IMPD 192); Format: CD | — | — | — |
| A Prescription for the Blues | Released: October 1997; Recorded: May 29 and 30, 1997; Label: Impulse! (IMPD 238); Format: CD | — | 25 | — |
| Jazz Has a Sense of Humor | Released: August 1999; Recorded: December 17 and 18, 1998; Label: Verve/Impulse! (IMPD 293); Format: CD | — | 22 | — |
| Rockin' with Rachmaninoff | Released: October 2003; Recorded: June 10, 11, 1991 and August 14, 15, 1991; Label: Bop City/DH1 Studios/Image Entertainment (DHS 1640); Format: CD | — | — | — |
"—" denotes a recording that did not chart.

== Live albums ==
| Album | Album Details | Peak chart positions | | |
| Album | Album Details | US | Top Jazz Albums | Top R&B Albums |
|---|---|---|---|---|
| Doin' the Thing | Released: August 1961; Recorded: May 19 and 20, 1961; Label: Blue Note (BLP 4076 [Mono], BST 84076 [Stereo]); Format: LP | — | — | — |
| Live 1964 | Released: 1984; Recorded: June 6, 1964; Label: Emerald (EMR 1001); Format: LP | — | — | — |
| The Natives are Restless Tonight | Released: 1990; Recorded: April 16, 1965; February 11, 1966; February 18, 1966; Label: Emerald (EMR 1003); Format: CD | — | — | — |
| Paris Blues | Released: 2002; Recorded: October 6, 1962; Label: Pablo (PACD 5316); Format: CD | — | — | — |
| Live at Newport '58 | Released: 2008; Recorded: July 6, 1958; Label: Blue Note/EMI (09463 98070 24); Format: CD | — | 9 | — |
| June 1977 (Bremen, Germany) | Released: 2014; Recorded: June 28, 1977; Label: Promising Music (441212); Format: CD | — | — | — |
| Live in Paris (14 Février 1959) | Released: 2016; Recorded: February 14, 1959; Label: Frémeaux & Associés (FA 5641); Format: CD | — | — | — |
| Silver in Seattle: Live at the Penthouse | Released: October 24, 2025; Recorded: August 12, 1965; August 19, 1965; Label: Blue Note/UMe (602478715679); Format: CD | — | — | — |
"—" denotes a recording that did not chart.

== Compilation albums ==
| Album | Album Details | Peak chart positions | | |
| Album | Album Details | US | Top Jazz Albums | Top R&B Albums |
|---|---|---|---|---|
| Horace Silver and the Jazz Messengers | Released: July 1956; Recorded: November 12, 1954, and February 6, 1955; Label: Blue Note (BLP 1518)); Format: LP | — | — | — |
| Horace Silver Trio and Art Blakey-Sabu | Released: October 1956; Recorded: October 9 and 20, 1952 and November 23, 1953; Label: Blue Note (BLP 1520)); Format: LP | — | — | — |
| The Trio Sides | Released: 1974; Recorded: Between 1953 and 1968; Label: Blue Note (BN-LA474-H2)); Format: LP | — | — | — |
| Sterling Silver | Released: 1979; Recorded: Between 1956 and 1964; Label: Blue Note (BN-LA945-H); Format: LP | — | — | — |
| The United States of Mind | Released: October 5, 2004; Recorded: Between 1970 and 1972; Label: Blue Note/EMI (72438 66745 24); Format: CD | — | — | — |
"—" denotes a recording that did not chart.

== Singles (78s and 45s) ==
| Year | Format | A-side | B-side | Catalog number | Label |
|---|---|---|---|---|---|
| 1952 | 10-inch 78 rpm | "Safari" | "Thou Swell" | 1608 | Blue Note |
| 1953 | 10-inch 78 rpm | "Opus de Funk" | "Day In, Day Out" | 1625 | Blue Note |
| 1955 | 7-inch 45 rpm | "The Preacher" | "Doodlin'" | 1630 | Blue Note |
| 1955 | 7-inch 45 rpm | "Room 608" | "Creepin' In" | 1631 | Blue Note |
| 1956 | 7-inch 45 rpm | "Enchantment" | "Camouflage" | 1654 | Blue Note |
| 1956 | 7-inch 45 rpm | "Señor Blues" | "Cool Eyes" | 1655 | Blue Note |
| 1957 | 7-inch 45 rpm | "Home Cookin'" | "The Back Beat" | 1672 | Blue Note |
| 1957 | 7-inch 45 rpm | "Soulville" | "No Smokin'" | 1673 | Blue Note |
| 1958 | 7-inch 45 rpm | "Safari" | "The Outlaw" | 1705 | Blue Note |
| 1958 | 7-inch 45 rpm | "Señor Blues" (vocal version) | "Tippin'" | 1710 | Blue Note |
| 1959 | 7-inch 45 rpm | "Come on Home" | "Finger Poppin'" | 1740 | Blue Note |
| 1959 | 7-inch 45 rpm | "Juicy Lucy" | "Cookin' at the Continental" | 1741 | Blue Note |
| 1959 | 7-inch 45 rpm | "Swinging the Samba" | "Mellow D" | 1742 | Blue Note |
| 1959 | 7-inch 45 rpm | "Sister Sadie" | "Break City" | 1750 | Blue Note |
| 1959 | 7-inch 45 rpm | "Blowin' the Blues Away" | "The Baghdad Blues" | 1751 | Blue Note |
| 1960 | 7-inch 45 rpm | "Strollin'" | "Nica's Dream" | 1784 | Blue Note |
| 1960 | 7-inch 45 rpm | "Me and My Baby" | "Where You At" | 1785 | Blue Note |
| 1961 | 7-inch 45 rpm | "Filthy McNasty, Part 1" | "Filthy McNasty, Part 2" | 1817 | Blue Note |
| 1961 | 7-inch 45 rpm | "Doin' the Thing, Part 1" | "Doin' the Thing, Part 2" | 1818 | Blue Note |
| 1962 | 7-inch 45 rpm | "Tokyo Blues, Part 1" | "Tokyo Blues, Part 2" | 1871 | Blue Note |
| 1962 | 7-inch 45 rpm | "Sayonara Blues, Part 1" | "Sayonara Blues, Part 2" | 1872 | Blue Note |
| 1962 | 7-inch 45 rpm | "Too Much Sake, Part 1" | "Too Much Sake, Part 2" | 1873 | Blue Note |
| 1963 | 7-inch 45 rpm | "Silver's Serenade" | "Let's Get to the Nitty Gritty" | 1902 | Blue Note |
| 1963 | 7-inch 45 rpm | "Sweet Sweetie Dee" | "The Dragon Lady" | 1903 | Blue Note |
| 1964 | 7-inch 45 rpm | "Song for My Father, Part 1" | "Song for My Father, Part 2" | 1912 | Blue Note |
| 1964 | 7-inch 45 rpm | "Que Pasa, Part 1" | "Que Pasa, Part 2" | 1913 | Blue Note |
| 1965 | 7-inch 45 rpm | "The Cape Verdean Blues" | "Pretty Eyes" | 1923 | Blue Note |
| 1965 | 7-inch 45 rpm | "The African Queen, Part 1" | "The African Queen, Part 2" | 1924 | Blue Note |
| 1966 | 7-inch 45 rpm | "The Jody Grind, Part 1" | "The Jody Grind, Part 2" | 1932 | Blue Note |
| 1968 | 7-inch 45 rpm | "Psychedelic Sally" | "Serenade to a Soul Sister" | 1939 | Blue Note |
| 1969 | 7-inch 45 rpm | "You Gotta Take a Little Love" | "Down and Out" | 1946 | Blue Note |
| 1970 | 7-inch 45 rpm | "The Show Has Begun" | "There's Much to be Done" | 1964 | Blue Note |
| 1970 | 7-inch 45 rpm | "I've Had a Little Talk" | "Acid, Pot or Pills" | 1975 | Blue Note |
| 1972 | 7-inch 45 rpm | "Horn of Life" | "The Cause and Effect" | 1978 | Blue Note |
| 1972 | 7-inch 45 rpm | "Nothing Can Stop Me Now" | "The Liberated Brother" | BN-XW325-W | Blue Note |
| 1976 | 7-inch 45 rpm | "Slow Down" | "Time and Effort" | BN-XW905-Y | Blue Note |
| 1976 | 7-inch 45 rpm | "Togetherness" | "Out of the Night Came You" | BN-XW1032 | Blue Note |

== Albums recorded with the Jazz Messengers ==
In addition to Horace Silver and the Jazz Messengers listed above, Silver recorded two live albums, a studio album, and portions of two more compilation albums as co-leader of the original Jazz Messengers with Art Blakey.

| Year | Title |
|---|---|
| 1955 | At the Cafe Bohemia, Vol. 1 |
| 1955 | At the Cafe Bohemia, Vol. 2 |
| 1956 | The Jazz Messengers |
| 1956 | The Cool Voice of Rita Reys |
| 1956 | Originally |

== Albums recorded as a sideman ==
| Year | Title | Leader | Label |
|---|---|---|---|
| 1950 | Stan Getz, Vol. 1 | Stan Getz | Roost (RLP 402) |
| 1951 | Chamber Music | Stan Getz | Roost (RLP 417) |
| 1951 | Split Kick | Stan Getz | Roost (RLP 423) |
Above albums are on The Complete Roost Recordings (Blue Note, 1950–54 [1997])
| 1952 | New Faces New Sounds | Lou Donaldson | Blue Note (BLP 5021) |
| 1952 | Disorder at the Border | Coleman Hawkins | Spotlite (SPJ 121) [1973] |
| 1953 | Sonny Stitt Playing Arrangements from the Pen of Johnny Richards | Sonny Stitt | Roost (RLP 415) |
| 1953 | Howard McGhee, Vol. 2 | Howard McGhee | Blue Note (BLP 5024) |
| 1953 | Al Cohn's Tones | Al Cohn | Savoy (MG 120488) |
| 1954 | Early Art | Art Farmer | Prestige (PRLP 177) |
| 1954 | A Night at Birdland, Vol. 1 | Art Blakey | Blue Note (BLP 5037) |
| 1954 | A Night at Birdland, Vol. 2 | Art Blakey | Blue Note (BLP 5038) |
| 1954 | A Night at Birdland, Vol. 3 | Art Blakey | Blue Note (BLP 5039) |
| 1954 | Miles Davis, Vol. 3 | Miles Davis | Blue Note (BLP 5040) |
| 1954 | Miles Davis Quartet | Miles Davis | Prestige (PRLP 161) |
| 1954 | Miles Davis Quintet | Miles Davis | Prestige (PRLP 185) |
| 1954 | Miles Davis All Star Sextet | Miles Davis | Prestige (PRLP 182) |
| 1954 | The Philosophy of Urso | Phil Urso | Savoy (MG 12056) |
| 1954 | When Farmer Met Gryce | Art Farmer | Prestige (PRLP 181) |
| 1954 | Cats vs. Chicks | Clark Terry and Terry Pollard | MGM (E 255) |
| 1954 | The Art Farmer Septet | Art Farmer | Prestige (PRLP 7031) |
| 1954 | Milt Jackson Quartet | Milt Jackson | Prestige (PRLP 183) |
| 1954 | Miles Davis with Sonny Rollins | Miles Davis | Prestige (PRLP 187) |
| 1955 | Clark Terry | Clark Terry | EmArcy (MG 36007) |
| 1955 | Afro-Cuban | Kenny Dorham | Blue Note (BLP 1535) |
| 1955 | Hank Mobley Quartet | Hank Mobley | Blue Note (BLP 5066) |
| 1955 | Milt Jackson Quartet | Milt Jackson | Prestige (PRLP 7003) |
| 1955 | The Eminent Jay Jay Johnson, Vol. 3 | J. J. Johnson | Blue Note (BLP 5070) |
| 1955 | Bohemia After Dark | Kenny Clarke | Savoy (MG 12017) |
| 1955 | Introducing Nat Adderley | Nat Adderley | Wing (MGW 60000) |
| 1955 | Nica's Tempo | Gigi Gryce | Savoy (MG 12137) |
| 1955 | Byrd's Eye View | Donald Byrd | Transition (TRLP J-4) |
| 1956 | Whims of Chambers | Paul Chambers | Blue Note (BLP 1534) |
| 1956 | J. R. Monterose | J. R. Monterose | Blue Note (BLP 1536) |
| 1956 | Lee Morgan Indeed! | Lee Morgan | Blue Note (BLP 1538) |
| 1956 | Hank Mobley with Donald Byrd and Lee Morgan | Hank Mobley | Blue Note (BLP 1540) |
| 1956 | Lee Morgan Vol. 2 | Lee Morgan | Blue Note (BLP 1541) |
| 1957 | Plenty, Plenty Soul | Milt Jackson | Atlantic (LP 1269) |
| 1957 | Hank Mobley and His All Stars | Hank Mobley | Blue Note (BLP 1544) |
| 1957 | Blowing In from Chicago | Cliff Jordan and John Gilmore | Blue Note (BLP 1549) |
| 1957 | Hank Mobley Quintet | Hank Mobley | Blue Note (BLP 1550) |
| 1957 | Sonny Rollins, Vol. 2 | Sonny Rollins | Blue Note (BLP 1558) |
| 1994 | Love and Peace: A Tribute to Horace Silver | Dee Dee Bridgewater | Verve (314 527 470-2) |
