= June 1977 (album) =

Live album by the Horace Silver Quintet
- Released: 2014
- Recorded: June 28, 1977
- Venues: Bremer Marktplatz, Bremen, Germany
- Genre: Jazz
- Length: 69:38
- Labels: Promising Music; 441212 CD
- Producer: Peter Schulze

Horace Silver chronology
Live at Newport '58 (2008)	June 1977 (2014)	Live in Paris (14 Février 1959) (2016)

June 1977 (The Livelove Series, Vol. 2) is a live album by the Horace Silver Quintet, recorded from an open-air concert in the Market Square of Bremen (Bremer Marktplatz), Germany, and broadcast live by Radio Bremen, on June 28, 1977. It was released by Promising Music in 2014.

Featuring music drawn from Silver's In Pursuit of the 27th Man (1973), Silver 'n Brass (1975), and Silver 'n Voices (1976), plus his well-known standard "Song for My Father", the album's line-up consists of trumpeter Tom Harrell, tenor saxophonist Larry Schneider, bassist Chip Jackson, and drummer Eddie Gladden.

== Reception ==
Professional ratings
Review scores
Source	Rating
All About Jazz	4.5/5 stars
The Guardian	3/5 stars
Jazzwise	3/5 stars

All About Jazz wrote, "With most of the song lengths topping the ten-minute mark the band gets plenty of space to stretch out, which they take full advantage of. [...] Probably the most striking thing about this recording is how vibrant it sounds. Silver's music was full of life, and he makes 1977 sound like it could be tomorrow."

Brian Zimmerman of DownBeat magazine stated, "The soulful post-bop pianist’s melodic phrases permeate the album, both in his tastefully rendered background comping and in his sparse, vocal-like solo motifs. [...] Silver’s accompanying musicians match his intensity".

The Observer's Dave Gelly commented, "They are all very good but, with the exception of trumpeter Tom Harrell, every phrase they play has 1977 stamped on it, whereas the themes and the piano-playing bear the Silver hallmark of true originality. A mixture of yearning romantic and slightly hyperactive joker, his musical personality was all his own and fashion had nothing to do with it."

Roy Carr for Jazzwise wrote, " though this was Silver's cosmic era, his compositions still followed the curvature of his much earlier trend-setting Blue Note recordings as did the retention of a trumpet / tenor sax front line."

== Track listing ==
All tracks are written by Horace Silver.

No.	Title	Length
1.	"Out of the Night Came You"	14:11
2.	"Sophisticated Hippie"	13:17
3.	"Barbara"	7:29
4.	"Incentive"	9:10
5.	"In Pursuit of the 27th Man"	11:56
6.	"Song for My Father"	13:35
Total length:		69:38

- Recorded live at The Market Place (Bremer Marktplatz), Bremen, Germany, on June 28, 1977

== Personnel ==
Musicians

- Horace Silver – piano, poetry
- Tom Harrell – trumpet, flugelhorn
- Larry Schneider – tenor saxophone
- Chip Jackson – double bass, bass guitar
- Eddie Gladden – drums

Technical

- Peter Schulze (Radio Bremen) – producer, recording engineer, liner notes
- Volker Steppat – concert producer
- Dietram Köster – recording engineer
- Jürgen Kuntze, Klaus Schumann – recording technician
- Eberhard Schnellen – mastering
- Michael Summ – remastering engineer
- Consul Bodo Jacoby – liner notes
- Nobuhisa Nakanishi – text transcription
- Jürgen Schwab – cover design
