= Paris Blues (disambiguation) =

Paris Blues is a 1961 film and its soundtrack album.

Paris Blues may also refer to:

- Paris Blues (Gil Evans and Steve Lacy album), recorded in 1987, released in 1988
- Paris Blues (Horace Silver album), recorded in 1962, released in 2002
- "Azure-Te" (Paris Blues), a 1952 blues ballad

== See also ==
- Prussian blue, or Paris blue, a dark blue pigment
- Paris Blue (album), a 2004 album by Kyle Eastwood
