= Total Response =

Studio album by Horace Silver Quintet/Sextet With Vocals
- Released: April 1972
- Recorded: November 15, 1970 (#1, 2, 6, 9); January 29, 1971 (#3–5, 7, 8)
- Studio: Van Gelder, Englewood Cliffs, NJ
- Genre: Jazz
- Length: 40:47
- Label: Blue Note; BST 84368
- Producer: Francis Wolff, George Butler

Horace Silver chronology
That Healin' Feelin' (1970)	Total Response (1972)	All (1972)

Total Response (subtitled The United States of Mind Phase 2) is an album by jazz pianist Horace Silver, released on the Blue Note label in 1972 and featuring performances by Silver with Cecil Bridgewater, Harold Vick, Richie Resnicoff, Bob Cranshaw and Mickey Roker, with vocals by Salome Bey and Andy Bey. In 2004, it was included as the second of a trilogy of albums compiled on CD as The United States of Mind.

== Reception ==
Professional ratings
Review scores
Source	Rating
AllMusic	2.5/5 stars

The AllMusic review by Stephen Thomas Erlewine called the album a "sprawling, incoherent, and just plain weird mess of funk, fusion, soul-jazz, African spirituality, and hippie mysticism".

== Track listing ==
All compositions by Horace Silver

1. "Acid, Pot or Pills" - 4:26
2. "What Kind of Animal Am I" - 3:38
3. "Won't You Open up Your Senses" - 3:56
4. "I've Had a Little Talk" - 3:46
5. "Soul Searching" - 4:15
6. "Big Business" - 5:22
7. "I'm Aware of the Animals Within Me" - 3:45
8. "Old Mother Nature Calls" - 6:17
9. "Total Response" - 5:22

== Personnel ==
- Horace Silver - electric piano
- Cecil Bridgewater - trumpet, flugelhorn
- Harold Vick - tenor saxophone
- Richie Resnicoff - guitar
- Bob Cranshaw - electric bass
- Mickey Roker - drums
- Salome Bey (1, 2, 5–7, 9), Andy Bey (3, 4, 8) - vocals
