= The Continuity of Spirit =

Studio album by Horace Silver
- Released: 1985
- Recorded: March 25, 1985
- Genre: Jazz
- Label: Silveto
- Producer: Horace Silver

Horace Silver chronology
Live 1964 (1984)	The Continuity of Spirit (1985)	Music to Ease Your Disease (1988)

The Continuity of Spirit is an album by jazz pianist Horace Silver, his fourth released on the Silveto label, featuring performances by Silver with Carl Saunders, Buddy Collette, Ray Pizzi, Ernie Watts, Don Menza, Bob Maize and Carl Burnett with the Los Angeles Modern String Orchestra conducted by William Henderson and vocals by Andy Bey, Maxine Waters, Julia Waters, and Chuck Niles.

== Reception ==
Professional ratings
Review scores
Source	Rating
Allmusic	2/5 stars

The Allmusic review by Scott Yanow awarded the album 2 stars and states: "The Continuity of Spirit finds Silver paying tribute to Duke Ellington, W.C. Handy and Scott Joplin. The idea of using disc jockey Chuck Niles as 'the spirit of Duke Ellington' is pretty hokey and the original music owes little to Ellington, Handy or Joplin; everything is in Horace Silver's own style. But there are some swinging moments on this well-intentioned set."

== Track listing ==
All compositions and lyrics by Horace Silver

1. "Message from the Maestro Part 1"
2. "Message from the Maestro Part 2"
3. "Message from the Maestro Part 3"
4. "In Tribute Part 1"
5. "In Tribute Part 2"
6. "In Tribute Part 3"

- Recorded in New York City on March 25, 1985.

== Personnel ==
- Horace Silver – piano
- Carl Saunders – flugelhorn
- Buddy Collette, Ray Pizzi, Ernie Watts, Don Menza – flute
- Bob Maize – bass
- Carl Burnette – drums
- Andy Bey, Maxine Waters, Julia Waters – vocals
- Chuck Niles – narration
- Los Angeles Modern String Orchestra, William Henderson – conductor
