= All (Horace Silver album) =

Studio album by Horace Silver Quintet/Sextet
- Released: September 1972
- Recorded: January 17 & February 14, 1972
- Studio: Van Gelder Studio, Englewood Cliffs, NJ
- Genre: Jazz
- Length: 42:09
- Label: Blue Note; BST 84420
- Producer: Francis Wolff, George Butler

Horace Silver chronology
| Total Response (1971) | All (1972) | In Pursuit of the 27th Man (1972) |

Professional ratings
Review scores
| Source | Rating |
|---|---|
| Allmusic | 3/5 stars |

All (subtitled The United States of Mind Phase 3) is an album by jazz pianist Horace Silver released on the Blue Note label in 1972, featuring performances by Silver with Cecil Bridgewater, Harold Vick, Richie Resnicoff, Bob Cranshaw and Mickey Roker, with vocals by Andy Bey, Salome Bey and Gail Nelson. It is the third of a trilogy of albums later compiled on CD as The United States of Mind.

The Allmusic review awarded the album 3 stars.

== Track listing ==
All compositions by Horace Silver

1. "The Merger of the Minds" - 4:47
2. "Cause and Effect" - 4:14
3. "Forever Is a Long Long Time" - 3:50
4. "My Soul Is My Computer" - 4:38
5. "How Much Does Matter Really Matter" - 3:09
6. "Horn of Life" - 6:27
7. "Who Has the Answer" - 3:42
8. "From the Heart Through the Mind" - 3:28
9. "All" - 5:39
10. "Summary" - 2:35

Recorded on January 17 (2, 3, 5, 7 & 8), and February 14 (1, 4, 6, 9 & 10), 1972.

== Personnel ==
- Horace Silver - electric piano, vocals
- Cecil Bridgewater - trumpet, flugelhorn (1, 4, 6, 10)
- Harold Vick - tenor saxophone (1, 4, 6 & 10)
- Richie Resnicoff - guitar (1, 10)
- Bob Cranshaw - electric bass (1–4, 6–10)
- Mickey Roker - drums (1–4, 6–10)
- Salome Bey - vocals (1, 3, 4, 9–10), Andy Bey (1, 2, 7–10), Gail Nelson (1, 5, 9–10) - vocals
