= Paris Blues (Horace Silver album) =

Live album by Horace Silver
- Released: November 12, 2002
- Recorded: October 6, 1962
- Venues: Olympia Theater, Paris
- Genres: Jazz; hard bop
- Length: 63:59
- Labels: Pablo; PACD 5316-2

Horace Silver chronology
Jazz Has a Sense of Humor (1999)	Paris Blues (2002)	Rockin' with Rachmaninoff (2003)

Paris Blues is a live album by American jazz pianist and composer Horace Silver, recorded on October 6, 1962, and released by Pablo Records on November 12, 2002. It contains previously unreleased performances by Silver's quintet—saxophonist Junior Cook, trumpeter Blue Mitchell, bassist Gene Taylor, and drummer Roy Brooks—from an appearance at the Olympia Theater in Paris.

== Reception ==
Professional ratings
Review scores
Source	Rating
All About Jazz	5/5 stars
AllMusic	3/5 stars

All About Jazz wrote, "this is hard bop reaching perfection, neither al dente nor over-cooked. All of the songs are lengthy Silver compositions. [...] Blue Mitchell and Junior Cook are in top form, blowing their potent mixture of smoky blues and pungent funk."

Alex Henderson of AllMusic stated, "Silver's quintet is in good form during an hourlong set that boasts extended performances [...]. All of the tunes last at least ten minutes, and "Sayonara Blues" lasts no less than 16 minutes − no one can claim that Silver and his sidemen don't have enough room to stretch out. Paris Blues isn't quite essential, but it's still an enjoyable hard bop CD that Silver's more devoted fans will welcome with open arms."

== Track listing ==
All tracks are written by Horace Silver.

No.	Title	Length
1.	"Introductions by Norman Granz and Horace Silver" (in French)	1:50
2.	"Where You At?"	10:42
3.	"The Tokyo Blues"	12:42
4.	"Filthy McNasty"	10:12
5.	"Sayonara Blues"	16:28
6.	"Doin' the Thing"	12:05
Total length:		63:59

- Recorded at the Olympia Theater, Paris, France, on October 6, 1962

== Personnel ==
Musicians

- Horace Silver − piano
- Junior Cook − tenor saxophone
- Blue Mitchell − trumpet
- Gene Taylor − bass
- Roy Brooks − drums

Technical

- Norman Granz − producer
- Joe Tarantino − digital editing, mastering, transfers
- Bob Bernotas − liner notes
- Jamie Putnam − art direction
- Deb Sibony − design
- Jan Persson − photography
