= Horace Silver Trio & Art Blakey–Sabu =

Album by Horace Silver

Compilation album by Horace Silver
- Released: October 1956
- Recorded: October 9 and 20, 1952, and November 23, 1953
- Studio: WOR Studios, NYC
- Genre: Jazz, hard bop
- Length: 40:26
- Label: Blue Note; BLP 1520
- Producer: Alfred Lion

Horace Silver chronology
New Faces New Sounds (1952)	Horace Silver Trio & Art Blakey–Sabu (1956)	Horace Silver and the Jazz Messengers (1955)

Professional ratings
Review scores
Source	Rating
The Penguin Guide to Jazz Recordings	3.5/4 stars
The Rolling Stone Jazz Record Guide	4/5 stars

Introducing the Horace Silver Trio

Studio album by Horace Silver
- Released: 1952
- Recorded: October 9 and 20, 1952
- Studio: WOR Studios, NYC
- Label: Blue Note; BLP 5018

Horace Silver Trio and Art Blakey, Vol. 2

Compilation album by Horace Silver Trio & Art Blakey
- Released: 1953
- Recorded: November 23, 1953
- Studio: WOR Studios, NYC
- Label: Blue Note; BLP 5034

Horace Silver Trio & Art Blakey–Sabu is an album by the Horace Silver Trio featuring drummer Art Blakey and conga player Sabu, recorded on October 9 & 20, 1952, and November 23, 1953, respectively, and released on Blue Note in 1956.

== Background ==
The sessions were previously issued on two 10"s, Introducing the Horace Silver Trio (1952) and Horace Silver Trio and Art Blakey, Vol. 2 (1953), respectively. While the original 12" LP omitted four tracks from these earlier 10" LPs, the CD reissue includes all 16 tracks from the original sessions.

== Track listing ==
=== Original release ===
All tracks are written by Horace Silver except where noted.

Side 1
No.	Title	Lyrics	Music	Date recorded	Length
1.	"Safari"			October 9, 1952	2:47
2.	"Ecaroh"			October 20, 1952	3:10
3.	"Prelude to a Kiss"	Irving Gordon, Irving Mills	Duke Ellington	October 20, 1952	2:47
4.	"Message from Kenya"		Art Blakey	November 23, 1953	2:47
5.	"Horoscope"			October 9, 1952	3:47
6.	"Yeah"			October 20, 1952	2:45

Side 2
No.	Title	Lyrics	Music	Date recorded	Length
1.	"How About You?"	Ralph Freed	Burton Lane	November 23, 1953	3:40
2.	"I Remember You"	Johnny Mercer	Victor Schertzinger	November 23, 1953	3:52
3.	"Opus de Funk"			November 23, 1953	3:26
4.	"Nothing but the Soul"		Art Blakey	November 23, 1953	4:07
5.	"Silverware"			November 23, 1953	2:34
6.	"Day In, Day Out"	Johnny Mercer	Rube Bloom	November 23, 1953	3:00

=== CD reissue ===
All tracks are written by Horace Silver except where noted.

No.	Title	Lyrics	Music	Date recorded	Length
1.	"Horace-Scope"			October 9, 1952	3:47
2.	"Safari"			October 9, 1952	2:47
3.	"Thou Swell"	Lorenz Hart	Richard Rodgers	October 9, 1952	2:52
4.	"Quicksilver"			October 20, 1952	3:00
5.	"Ecaroh"			October 20, 1952	3:10
6.	"Yeah"			October 20, 1952	2:45
7.	"Knowledge Box"			October 20, 1952	2:46
8.	"Prelude to a Kiss"	Irving Gordon, Irving Mills	Duke Ellington	October 20, 1952	2:47
9.	"I Remember You"	Johnny Mercer	Victor Schertzinger	November 23, 1953	3:52
10.	"Opus de Funk"			November 23, 1953	3:26
11.	"Day In, Day Out"	Johnny Mercer	Rube Bloom	November 23, 1953	3:00
12.	"Silverware"			November 23, 1953	2:34
13.	"How About You?"	Ralph Freed	Burton Lane	November 23, 1953	3:40
14.	"Buhaina"			November 23, 1953	3:04
15.	"Message from Kenya"		Art Blakey	November 23, 1953	4:30
16.	"Nothing but the Soul"		Art Blakey	November 23, 1953	4:07
Total length:					50:08

=== Introducing the Horace Silver Trio – BLP 5018 ===
Side 1
No.	Title	Date recorded	Length
1.	"Safari"	October 9, 1952
2.	"Ecaroh"	October 20, 1952
3.	"Prelude to a Kiss"	October 20, 1952
4.	"Thou Swell"	October 9, 1952

Side 2
No.	Title	Date recorded	Length
1.	"Quicksilver"	October 20, 1952
2.	"Horoscope"	October 9, 1952
3.	"Yeah"	October 20, 1952
4.	"Knowledge Box"	October 20, 1952

=== Horace Silver Trio and Art Blakey, Vol. 2 – BLP 5034 ===
Side 1
No.	Title	Writer(s)	Date recorded	Length
1.	"How About You"	Lane; Freed	November 23, 1953
2.	"I Remember You"	Mercer; Schertzinger	November 23, 1953
3.	"Silverware"	Silver	November 23, 1953
4.	"Message from Kenya"	Blakey	November 23, 1953

Side 2
No.	Title	Writer(s)	Date recorded	Length
1.	"Opus de Funk"	Silver	November 23, 1953
2.	"Nothing but the Soul"	Blakey	November 23, 1953
3.	"Buhaina"	Silver	November 23, 1953
4.	"Day In, Day Out"	Mercer; Bloom	November 23, 1953

== Personnel ==
=== Horace Silver Trio ===
==== October 9, 1952 ====
- Horace Silver – piano
- Gene Ramey – bass
- Art Blakey – drums

==== October 20, 1952 ====
- Horace Silver – piano
- Curley Russell – bass
- Art Blakey – drums

==== November 23, 1953 ====
- Horace Silver – piano (except "Message from Kenya", "Nothing but the Soul")
- Percy Heath – bass (except "Message from Kenya", "Nothing but the Soul")
- Art Blakey – drums
- Sabu – conga ("Message from Kenya")

=== Technical personnel ===
- Alfred Lion – production
- Reid Miles, John Hermansader (BLP 5018), Jerome Kuhl (BLP 5034) – design
- Francis Wolff – photography
- Rudy Van Gelder – remastering
- Leonard Feather – liner notes
