= Live 1964 =

Live album by Horace Silver
- Released: 1984
- Recorded: June 6, 1964
- Venue: "The Cork & Bib" nightclub, Long Island
- Genre: Jazz
- Label: Emerald Records

Horace Silver chronology
| There's No Need to Struggle (1983) | Live 1964 (1984) | The Continuity of Spirit (1985) |

Professional ratings
Review scores
| Source | Rating |
|---|---|
| Allmusic | 4/5 stars |

Live 1964 is a live album by jazz pianist Horace Silver recorded on June 6, 1964, in "The Cork & Bib" nightclub in Westbury, Long Island, New York, on June 6, 1964 but released only in 1984 on the Emerald Records label.

== Track listing ==
All tracks are written by Horace Silver.

| No. | Title | Length |
|---|---|---|
| 1. | "Introduction by Horace Silver" | 0:27 |
| 2. | "Filthy McNasty" | 8:44 |
| 3. | "Skinney Minnie" | 14:32 |
| 4. | "The Tokyo Blues" | 14:56 |
| 5. | "Señor Blues" | 6:36 |

== Personnel ==
The Horace Silver Quintet

- Horace Silver – piano, liner notes
- Teddy Smith – bass
- Roger Humphries – drums
- Joe Henderson – tenor sax
- Carmell Jones – trumpet

Production

- Sylvester Brown – cover design
- Jim Mooney – engineer
- Hans Horzheim – photography
- William Glaser – recording
