= Silver 'n Wood =

Studio album by Horace Silver
- Released: 1976
- Recorded: November 7, 1975, January 2 & 3, 1976
- Genre: Jazz
- Label: Blue Note
- Producer: George Butler

Horace Silver chronology
Silver 'n Brass (1975)	Silver 'n Wood (1976)	Silver 'n Voices (1976)

Professional ratings
Review scores
Source	Rating
Allmusic	3/5 stars
The Rolling Stone Jazz Record Guide	2/5 stars

Silver 'n Wood is an album by jazz pianist Horace Silver released on the Blue Note label in 1975 featuring performances by Silver with Tom Harrell, Bob Berg, Ron Carter and Al Foster, with an overdubbed horn section conducted by Wade Marcus featuring Buddy Collette, Fred Jackson, Jr., Jerome Richardson, Lanny Morgan, Jack Nimitz, Bill Green, Garnett Brown, and Frank Rosolino.

== Reception ==
The Allmusic review by Scott Yanow awarded the album 3 stars and states: "The two sidelong works ('The Tranquilizer Suite' and 'The Process of Creation Suite') are not all that memorable but the music overall (helped out by strong solos) is typical Silver hard bop".

== Track listing ==
All compositions by Horace Silver

1. "The Tranquilizer Suite Part 1: Keep On Gettin' Up" -
2. "The Tranquilizer Suite Part 2: Slow Down" -
3. "The Tranquilizer Suite Part 3: Time And Effort" -
4. "The Tranquilizer Suite, Part 4: Perseverance And Endurance" -
5. "The Process Of Creation Suite Part 1: Motivation" -
6. "The Process Of Creation Suite Part 2: Activation" -
7. "The Process Of Creation Suite Part 3: Assimilation" -
8. "The Process Of Creation Suite Part 4: Creation" -

- Recorded at A&R Studios, NYC on November 7, 1975 & overdubs at Wally Heider Sound Studio III, Los Angeles, CA on January 2 & 3, 1976.

== Personnel ==
- Horace Silver - piano, arrangements
- Tom Harrell - trumpet
- Bob Berg - tenor saxophone
- Ron Carter - bass
- Al Foster - drums
- Buddy Collette, Fred Jackson, Jr. - flute, piccolo
- Jerome Richardson - soprano saxophone
- Lanny Morgan - alto saxophone
- Jack Nimitz - baritone saxophone, flute
- Bill Green - bass saxophone, flute
- Garnett Brown - trombone (tracks 1–4)
- Frank Rosolino - trombone (tracks 5–8)
- Wade Marcus - conducting
