= The United States of Mind =

Compilation album by Horace Silver
- Released: October 5, 2004
- Recorded: April 8 & June 18, 1970, November 15, 1970 & January 29, 1971, January 17 & February 14, 1972
- Genre: Jazz
- Length: 119:19
- Label: Blue Note
- Producer: Francis Wolff & George Butler

Professional ratings
Review scores
Source	Rating
Allmusic	4/5 stars
The Penguin Guide to Jazz	3/4 stars
Tom Hull	B+

The United States of Mind is a compilation album by jazz pianist Horace Silver, released on the Blue Note label in 2004 compiling the three separate 'Phases' previously released as That Healin' Feelin' (1970), Total Response (1971) and All (1972). It features performances by Silver with Randy Brecker, George Coleman, Houston Person, Cecil Bridgewater, Harold Vick, Richie Resnicoff, Bob Cranshaw, Jimmy Lewis, Mickey Roker and Idris Muhammad, with vocals by Andy Bey, Salome Bey, Gail Nelson and Jackie Verdell.

In a 1974 radio interview published in 2009, Silver stated "I got interested in writing lyrics about that time and, well, became interested in Metaphysics and Indian philosophies, and Yoga philosophies. I have always been interested in health foods, vitamins; you know, the health thing. So, I was trying to get the physical thing, the mental thing, and the spiritual thing altogether. I was doing a lot of reading, a lot of soul-searching, a lot of meditation; and I put it altogether and came up with The United States of Mind, which deals with all of that which I just mentioned; dealing with the physical, the mental and the spiritual things".

== Reception ==
The Allmusic review by Thom Jurek awarded the album 4 stars (a higher rating than any of the individual albums received) and states "To say that these albums were misunderstood is to understate the case. Silver had been one of Blue Note's most reliable and steady hard- and post-bop artists since the late 1950s. There was nothing in his catalog that prepared listeners for this adventurous undertaking that linked spiritual concepts and social consciousness to modern jazz as it encountered soul, funk, and pop at the dawn of a new decade... Ultimately, these records deserve a new hearing. Perhaps Silver's traditional fans who worship the hard bop material still won't get them, and that's fine. But those investigating jazz funk, '70s soul, or seeking out lost grooves from back in the day would do well to listen hard because the reward is bountiful. The quality and vision of the music here is unquestionable, and the bigger message found on these albums is as timely and eternal".

== Track listing ==
All compositions by Horace Silver

Disc One:

1. "That Healin' Feelin" - 3:54
2. "The Happy Medium" - 4:58
3. "The Show Has Begun" - 4:11
4. "Love Vibrations" - 4:03
5. "Peace" - 3:26
6. "Permit Me to Introduce You to Yourself" - 3:13
7. "Wipe Away the Evil" - 4:15
8. "Nobody Knows" - 4:12
9. "There's Too Much to Be Done" - 4:11
10. "Acid, Pot or Pills" - 4:26
11. "What Kind of Animal Am I" - 3:38
12. "Won't You Open up Your Senses" - 3:56
13. "I've Had a Little Talk" - 3:46
14. "Soul Searching" - 4:15

Disc Two:

1. "Big Business" - 5:22
2. "I'm Aware of the Animals Within Me" - 3:45
3. "Old Mother Nature Calls" - 6:17
4. "Total Response" - 5:22
5. "The Merger of the Minds" - 4:47
6. "Cause and Effect" - 4:14
7. "Forever Is a Long Long Time" - 3:50
8. "My Soul Is My Computer" - 4:38
9. "How Much Does Matter Really Matter" - 3:09
10. "Horn of Life" - 6:27
11. "Who Has the Answer" - 3:42
12. "From the Heart Through the Mind" - 3:28
13. "All" - 5:39
14. "Summary" - 2:35

Recorded at Van Gelder Studio, Englewood Cliffs, NJ on April 8, 1970 (Disc One tracks 1–5), June 18, 1970 (Disc One tracks 6–9), November 15, 1970 (Disc One tracks 10 & 11, Disc Two tracks 1 & 4), January 29, 1971 (Disc One tracks 12–14, Disc Two track 2 & 3), January 17, 1972 (Disc Two tracks 6, 7, 9, 11 & 12) and February 14, 1972 (Disc Two tracks 5, 9, 10, 13 & 14).

== Personnel ==
- Horace Silver - piano, electric piano, vocals
- Randy Brecker - trumpet, flugelhorn (Disc One tracks 1–9)
- Cecil Bridgewater - trumpet, flugelhorn (Disc One tracks 10–14, Disc Two tracks 1–5, 8, 10 & 14)
- George Coleman - tenor saxophone (Disc One tracks 1–5)
- Houston Person - tenor saxophone (Disc One tracks 6–9)
- Harold Vick - tenor saxophone (Disc One tracks 10–14, Disc Two tracks 1–5, 8, 10 & 14)
- Richie Resnicoff - guitar (Disc One tracks 10–14, Disc Two tracks 1–5 & 14)
- Bob Cranshaw - electric bass (Disc One tracks 1–5 & 10–14, Disc Two tracks 1–8 & 10–14)
- Jimmy Lewis - electric bass (Disc One tracks 6–9)
- Mickey Roker - drums (Disc One tracks 1–5 & 10–14, Disc Two tracks 1–8 & 10–14)
- Idris Muhammad - drums (Disc One tracks 6–9)
- Andy Bey - vocals (Disc One tracks 1, 3–5, 12 & 13, Disc Two tracks 4–6 & 11–14)
- Gail Nelson - vocals (Disc One track 6, Disc Two tracks 5, 9, 13 & 14)
- Jackie Verdell - vocals (Disc One tracks 7–9)
- Salome Bey - vocals (Disc One tracks 10, 11 & 14, Disc Two tracks 1, 2, 4, 5, 7, 13 & 14)
