= Silver 'n Percussion =

Studio album by Horace Silver
- Released: 1977
- Recorded: November 12, 17, 25 & 30, 1977
- Studio: Van Gelder Studio, Englewood Cliffs, NJ
- Genre: Jazz
- Label: Blue Note
- Producer: Horace Silver

Horace Silver chronology
Silver 'n Voices (1976)	Silver 'n Percussion (1977)	Silver 'n Strings Play the Music of the Spheres (1979)

Professional ratings
Review scores
Source	Rating
AllMusic	3/5 stars
DownBeat	4/5 stars
The Rolling Stone Jazz Record Guide	3/5 stars

Silver 'n Percussion is an album by jazz pianist Horace Silver. It was released on the Blue Note label in 1977.

== Reception ==
The AllMusic review by Michael G. Nastos stated: "Silver's best work came prior to this recording, but this may be his best work of the 1970s. Even though it's a little short, at under 40 minutes, it's nonetheless recommended and, perhaps for the leader, worth a revisit."

== Track listing ==
All compositions by Horace Silver

1. "African Ascension Part 1: The Gods of Yoruba" –
2. "African Ascension Part 2: The Sun God of the Masai" –
3. "African Ascension Part 3: The Spirit of the Zulu" –
4. "The Great American Indian Uprising Part 1: The Idols of the Incas" –
5. "The Great American Indian Uprising Part 2: The Aztec Sun God" –
6. "The Great American Indian Uprising Part 3: The Mohican and the Great Spirit" –

- Recorded at Rudy Van Gelder Studio, Englewood Cliffs, NJ, November 12 (tracks 1–3) & 17 (tracks 4–6),1977 with vocal overdubs recorded on November 25 & 30, 1977.

== Personnel ==
- Horace Silver – piano, arrangements
- Tom Harrell – trumpet
- Larry Schneider – tenor saxophone
- Ron Carter – bass
- Al Foster – drums
- Babatunde Olatunji – percussion
- Ladji Camara – percussion (tracks 1–3)
- Omar Clay – percussion (tracks 4–6)
- Fred Hardy, Lee C. Thomas, Fred Gripper, Bob Barnes, Bobby Clay, Peter Oliver Norman – vocals
- Chapman Roberts – musical direction, vocals
