= Larry Schneider (musician) =

American jazz saxophonist (born 1949)

- Born: July 26, 1949 (age 77); Long Island, New York, U.S.
- Genre: Jazz
- Occupation: Musician
- Instrument: Saxophone
- Years active: 1970s–present
- Labels: Label Bleu; SteepleChase; Splasc(h)
- Education: Brandeis University

Larry Schneider (born July 26, 1949) is an American jazz saxophonist.

== Early life ==
Schneider was born on Long Island in 1949. He attended Brandeis University, where he studied biology, but in 1970, he decided to become a professional musician instead.

== Later life and career ==
After relocating to New York City, Schneider played as a sideman in the 1970s with Billy Cobham, the Thad Jones/Mel Lewis Orchestra, Horace Silver, Jim McNeely, Mike Richmond, and Bill Evans. Around 1980, he moved again, to San Francisco, where he worked with Hein van de Geyn and John Abercrombie, though he increasingly performed in Europe in the later 1980s and 1990s, with François Jeanneau, the Orchestre National de Jazz, Marc Ducret, François Méchali, Alain Soler, André Jaume, Éric Barret, and others.

After music, his second passion is tennis.

== Discography ==
=== As leader ===
- So easy (Label Bleu, 1988)
- Just Cole Porter (SteepleChase, 1991)
- Blind Date (SteepleChase, 1992)
- Bill Evans... Person We Knew (SteepleChase, 1992)
- Mohawk (SteepleChase, 1994?)
- "Freedom Jazz Dance" (Steeplechase, 1996)
- Ali Girl (SteepleChase, 1997)
- Summertime in San Remo (Splasc(h), 1997)
- Ornettology (SteepleChase, 1998)
- Lemon Lips (Splasc(h), 2000)
- It Might as Well Be Spring (SteepleChase, 2000)
- Jazz (SteepleChase, 2001)
- "It Might as Well Be Spring" (Steeplechase, 2003)

=== As sideman ===
With Ray Anderson

- Big Band Record (Gramavision, 1994)

With Billy Cobham

- A Funky Thide of Sings (Atlantic, 1975)

With Miles Davis and Quincy Jones

- Miles & Quincy Live at Montreux (Warner Bros., 1991 [1993])

With Marc Ducret

- Le Kodo (Label Bleu, 1989)

With Bill Evans

- Affinity (Warner Bros., 1979) with Toots Thielemans
- We Will Meet Again (Warner Bros.,1979)

With George Gruntz

- First Prize (Enja, 1989)

With the Thad Jones/Mel Lewis Orchestra

- Thad Jones/Mel Lewis Orchestra with Rhoda Scott (Barklay, 1976)
- Live in Munich (Horizon, 1976)

With Horace Silver

- Silver 'n Percussion (Blue Note, 1977)
- Silver 'n Strings Play the Music of the Spheres (Blue Note, 1979)

With Jody Watley

- Jody Watley (MCA, 1987)

With Diederik Wissels Quartet

- Malinka (Timeless, 1987)

With Chris Potter and Rick Margitza

- Jam Session Vol. 1 (SteepleChase, 2002)
