= New Faces New Sounds (Introducing the Horace Silver Trio) =

Studio album by Horace Silver
- Released: December 1952
- Recorded: October 9, 1952 and October 20, 1952
- Studio: WOR Studios, New York City
- Genre: Jazz, hard bop
- Label: Blue Note; BLP 5018

Horace Silver chronology
| New Faces New Sounds (Introducing the Horace Silver Trio) (1952) | Horace Silver Trio and Art Blakey-Sabu (1955) |

New Faces New Sounds (Introducing the Horace Silver Trio) is the first studio album by American jazz pianist Horace Silver. "New Faces New Sounds" was a common name used by Blue Note label for the first albums of Lou Donaldson and Kenny Drew, among others.

== Track listing ==
A1. "Safari" (Silver)
A2. "Ecaroh" (Silver)
A3. "Prelude to a Kiss" (Duke Ellington, Irving Gordon, Irving Mills)
A4. "Thou Swell" (Lorenz Hart, Richard Rodgers)
B1. "Quicksilver" (Silver)
B2. "Horoscope" (Silver)
B3. "Yeah" (Silver)
B4. "Knowledge Box" (Silver)

== Personnel ==
Band

- Horace Silver – piano
- Art Blakey – drums
- Curly Russell – bass (tracks: A2, A3, B1, B3, B4)
- Gene Ramey – bass (tracks: A1, A4, B2)

Production

- Leonard Feather – liner notes
- John Hermansader – cover
