= Bob McChesney =

American musician and educator

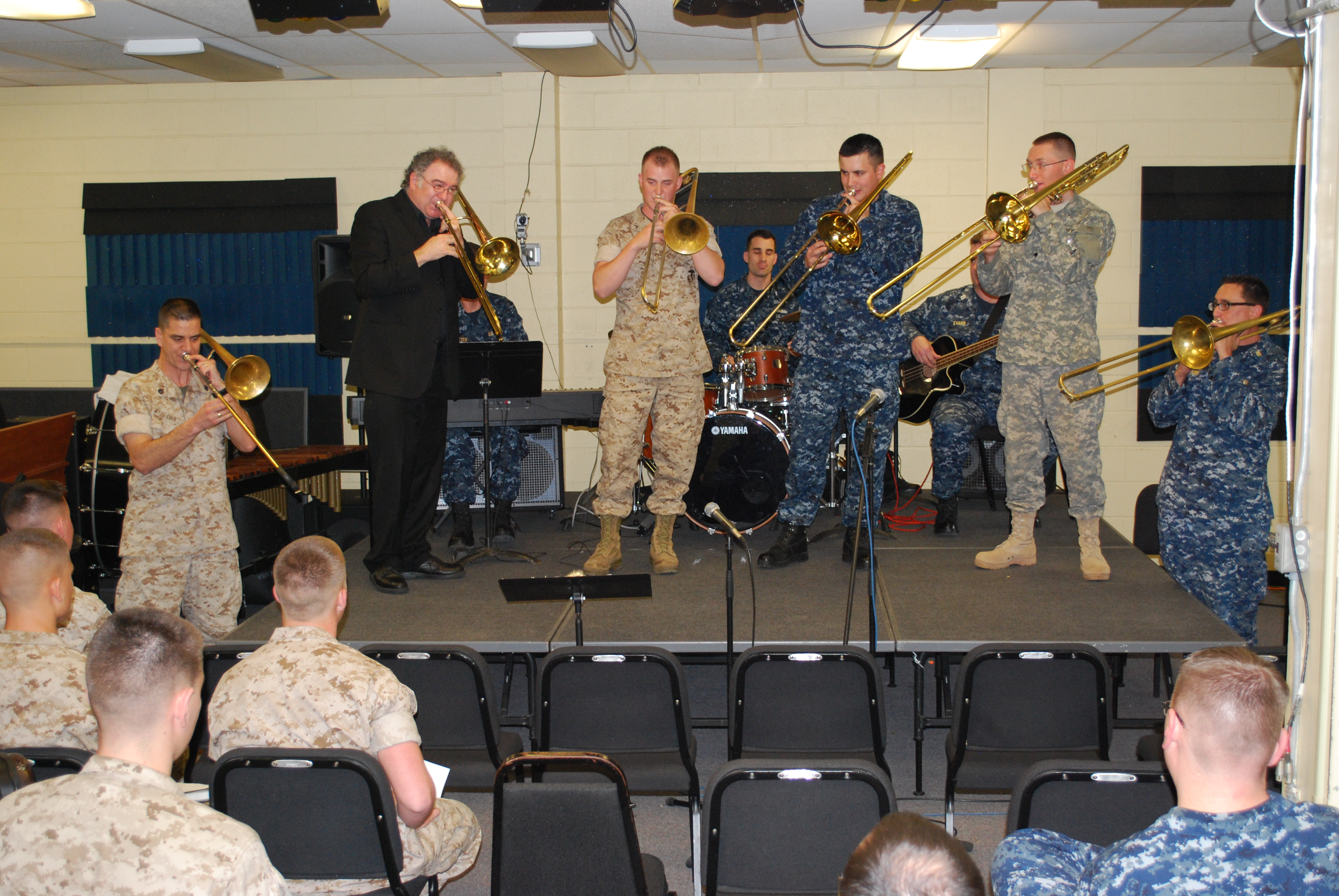
Bob McChesney performs at the U.S. Navy School of Music in 2011.

Bob McChesney is an LA based jazz and studio trombonist, famous for his use and mastery of the 'doodle - tongue,' a method of articulation on the trombone as well as his ultra fast and melodic solos. He currently teaches in the music department at California State University, Northridge.

== Biography ==
McChesney is a trombonist born in Baltimore, Maryland. He began studying trombone at the age of nine and holds a bachelor's degree from State University of New York at Fredonia. He moved to Los Angeles in 1979, and is married to jazz violinist and vocalist Calabria Foti.

His film credits include Rocky Balboa, The Pursuit of Happyness, Everyone's Hero, The Good Shepherd, Mystic River, Rush Hour 2, Bringing Down the House, The Cooler, and Space Jam. TV shows featuring his work include The Simpsons, Family Guy, American Dad!, Happy Hour, Looney Tunes, JAG, King of the Hill, Futurama.

== Discography ==
He can be heard on albums for Barbra Streisand, Shakira, Michael Buble, Natalie Cole, Rod Stewart, Chicago, and Michael Bolton.

He can be heard as a jazz soloist on his own album No Laughing Matter - The Bob McChesney Quartet Plays Steve Allen, as a jazz soloist on his own album CHEZ SEZ, Horace Silver's It's Got to Be Funky (1993), and on Bob Florence's Grammy-winning album Serendipity 18.
