= Rockin' with Rachmaninoff =

Studio album by Horace Silver
- Released: October 28, 2003
- Recorded: June 10–11 & August 14–15, 1991
- Genre: Jazz
- Label: Bop City
- Producer: Horace Silver

Horace Silver chronology
Jazz Has a Sense of Humor (1999)	Rockin' with Rachmaninoff (2003)	Live at Newport '58 (2007)

Professional ratings
Review scores
Source	Rating
Allmusic	4/5 stars

Rockin' with Rachmaninoff is an album by jazz pianist Horace Silver, recorded in 1991 and released on the Bop City label in 2003, featuring performances by Silver with Michael Mossman, Bob Summers, Ricky Woodard, Ralph Bowen, Doug Webb, Andy Martin, Bob McChesney, Bob Maize, and Carl Burnett, with vocals by Andy Bey. The Allmusic review by Ken Dryden awarded the album 4 stars and states "Horace Silver's Rockin' With Rachmaninoff was originally conceived as a stage musical, complete with singers, dancers, musicians, and a narrator to tell the story of the composer's idea of Duke Ellington introducing Sergei Rachmaninoff to all the jazz greats in heaven... If this CD is any indication as to the quality of Horace Silver's short-lived musical, it must have been one hell of a show".

== Track listing ==
All compositions and lyrics by Horace Silver

1. "Rocky's Overture" – 5:39
2. "Rocky Meets the Duke" – 6:09
3. "Satchmo's Song" – 7:16
4. "Monkeyin' Around With Monk" – 5:42
5. "A Ballad for Hawk" – 5:51
6. "The Skunky Funky Blues" – 6:51
7. "Sunday Mornin' Prayer Meetin'" – 5:03
8. "Hallelujah to Ya" – 5:11
9. "The Righteous Rumba" – 6:23
10. "Lavender Love" – 5:29
11. "Rockin' with Rachmaninoff" – 4:31

== Personnel ==
- Horace Silver – piano
- Michael Mossman, Bob Summers – trumpet
- Ricky Woodard, Ralph Bowen, Doug Webb – tenor saxophone
- Andy Martin, Bob McChesney – trombone
- Bob Maize – bass
- Carl Burnett – drums
- Andy Bey – vocals
- Dawn Burnett – vocals
