= Pencil Packin' Papa =

Studio album by Horace Silver
- Released: 1994
- Recorded: January 10 & 11, 1994
- Genre: Jazz
- Label: Columbia
- Producer: Horace Silver

Horace Silver chronology
It's Got to Be Funky (1993)	Pencil Packin' Papa (1994)	The Hardbop Grandpop (1996)

Professional ratings
Review scores
Source	Rating
Allmusic	4/5 stars

Pencil Packin' Papa is an album by jazz pianist Horace Silver released on the Columbia label in 1994 featuring performances by Silver with Oscar Brashear, Ron Stout, Jeff Bernell, George Bohanon, Maurice Spears, Suzette Moriarty, Red Holloway, James Moody, Eddie Harris, Rickey Woodard, Bob Maize, and Carl Burnett, with vocals by O.C. Smith.

The Allmusic review by Scott Yanow awarded the album 4 stars and states: "This CD's main assets are the many new compositions by Horace Silver and his colorful arrangements for the six-piece brass section... In addition, O.C. Smith does a fine job on his four vocals although Silver's abilities as a lyricist are still open to question. However his piano solos are typically exciting and inventive and Silver has obviously lost none of his enthusiasm even after four decades of music making."

== Track listing ==
All compositions and lyrics by Horace Silver

1. "Pencil Packin' Papa" – 5:48
2. "I Got the Dancin' Blues" – 7:08
3. "Soul Mates" – 6:50
4. "I Need My Baby" – 7:02
5. "My Mother's Waltz" – 6:11
6. "Red Beans and Rice" – 7:21
7. "Blues for Brother Blue" – 8:13
8. "Let It All Hang Out" – 4:56
9. "Señor Blues" – 6:58
10. "Viva Amour" – 5:59

- Ocean Way Recording Studios, Los Angeles, CA – January 10 & 11, 1994

== Personnel ==
- Horace Silver – piano
- Oscar Brashear, Ron Stout, Jeff Bernell – trumpet, flugelhorn
- George Bohanon – trombone
- Maurice Spears – bass trombone
- Suzette Moriarty – French horn
- Red Holloway, James Moody, Eddie Harris, Rickey Woodard – tenor saxophone
- Bob Maize – bass
- Carl Burnett – drums
- O.C. Smith – vocals
