= Rhoda Scott =

American jazz musician

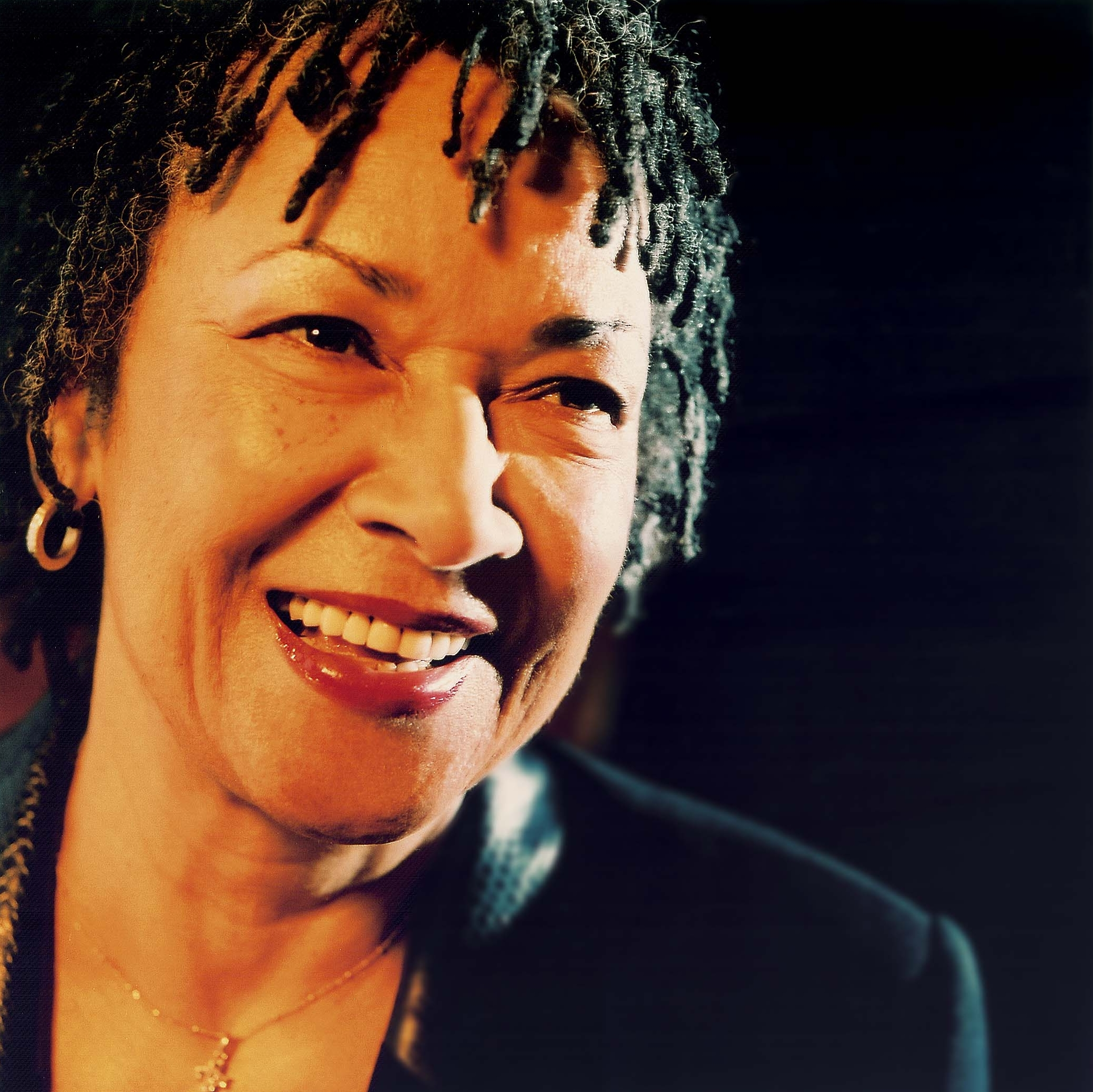
- Rhoda Scott in 2006

Background information
- Also known as: The Barefoot Lady
- Born: Rhoda Scott; 3 July 1938 (age 88); Dorothy neighborhood of Weymouth Township, New Jersey
- Genre: soul jazz
- Occupations: Musician; Organist; Singer
- Instruments: Organ
- Years active: 1955 - Present

Rhoda Scott (born July 3, 1938) is an American soul jazz organist and singer. She is nicknamed "The Barefoot Lady".

== Biography and musical career ==
Scott was born and raised in the Dorothy neighborhood of Weymouth Township, New Jersey, the first child to a Black travelling minister father and a white mother. She has six siblings.

Her parents were themselves musicians, playing piano and organ, and singing as well. As a minister, her father moved frequently to different small churches and he would take her along with him to where he worked, where she heard her first gospels and spirituals.

Scott was first attracted to the organ in her father's church at age seven. "It's really the most beautiful instrument in the world", she stated in a 2002 interview. "The first thing I did was take my shoes off and work the pedals." From then on she always played her church organ in her bare feet, a practice she continued for decades. As a nine-year-old, she took over as the church organist when her predecessor called in sick.

Around 12 or 13, Scott served as a piano tutor at her boarding school, work she continued into high school at the New Jersey Manual Training School in Bordentown, New Jersey. She enrolled at Westminster Choir College at age 16, and there discovered Bach. She remained at Westminster for two years, before financial concerns led to her leaving for a job as a bookkeeper at a fashion designer. She later studied music theory at the Manhattan School of Music.

At 20 years old, Scott began to play the organ in an R&B group. She soon founded her own groups, gigging around metro New York, eventually opening for Count Basie in Newark, where he invited her to play his Harlem club. In 1963, she recorded her first album, Live! at the Key Club (Tru-Sound/Prestige TSLP-15014). She also met Eddie Barclay, who paid $75 to acquire one of her songs, Hey Hey Hey that became a big hit.

Little by little, Scott toured in every state in America, but tired of her group:

In general, my 2 bandmates were very attracted to sequins . . . and the longer we went on, the more they wanted me to dress sexier, with slit dresses, high heels, makeup, and I felt less and less comfortable in the situation, as if I didn't belong to myself.

— Rhoda Scott

In 1967, Scott moved to France, where she has since spent most of her career.

As well as making a career in jazz, Scott has also continued playing the organ in church: For forty years, she was the organist at her parish church in Perche, France.

== Personal life ==
Scott married a Frenchman, actor-singer Raoul Saint-Yves, in 1968, after which he became her manager. They had two children, both adopted, who were born in Haiti.

== Discography ==
- Hey! Hey! Hey! (Tru-Sound/Prestige TSLP-15013, 1962)
- Live! at the Key Club (Tru-Sound/Prestige TSLP-15014, 1963)
- A L'Orgue Hammond: Take a Ladder (RSB [Scott's label] 331, 1969; reissues: Barclay 920.168 in 1970, Barclay 200.425 in 1982 as Moanin')
- A L'Orgue Hammond, Vol. 2 (Barclay 920.126, 1970)
- A L'Orgue Hammond, Vol. 3: Come Bach To Me (Barclay 920.240, 1971)
- Live at the Olympia (Barclay 920.379/80 [2LP], 1971; CD reissue: Gitanes Jazz 549879 in 2001)
- A L'Orgue Hammond: Ballades No. 1 (Barclay 920.430, 1973; reissue: Barclay 80.574 in 1975)
- A L'Orgue Hammond, Vol. 4: Mach 2 (Barclay 920.350, 1974)
- Live at the Club Saint-Germain (Barclay 80.535/36 [2LP], 1974; CD reissue: Universal 0600753021682 in 2007)
- A L'Orgue Hammond: Ballades No. 2 (Barclay 80.575, 1975)
- A L'Orgue Hammond: Ballades No. 3 (Barclay 80.576, 1975)
- Rhoda Scott Budapesten (Pepita [Hungary] SLPX-17487, 1975)
- Rhoda Scott in New York (Barclay 90.068, 1976; reissue: Barclay 200.424 in 1982; CD reissue: Barclay 813590 in 1983)
- Rhoda Scott + Kenny Clarke (Barclay 90.138, 1977; CD reissue: Gitanes Jazz 549287 in 2000)
- Les Orgues de Noël (Barclay 90.147, 1977)
- Molybdenum (Barclay 91.027, 1979)
- Rhoda Scott Live (Barclay 91.063, 1980)
- Stay (A L'Orgue Hammond) (Barclay 200.273, 1981)
- Negro Spirituals (Chantés et Interprétés à L'Orgue Hammond par Rhoda Scott) (Barclay 817102, 1983)
- Classiques & Jazz (à l'Orgue Hammond) (Barclay 823804, 1984)
- Frame For the Blues (Verve 513294, 1992)
- Feelin' the Groove (Verve 521304, 1993)
- Alone (Verve 537635, 1997)
- The Hammond Organ of Christmas [rec. 1977/1993] (Sunnyside SSC-3017, 2003)
- Encore, Encore, Encore ... (Sunnyside SSC-3027, 2003)
- Very Saxy: Live Au Meridien (Ahead AH-820.2 [2CD], 2005)
- Live in Concert! Christian Röver Group Live with Rhoda Scott at the Organ! (Organic Music ORGM-9704, 2006)
- From C to Shining C (Doodlin' DR-001, 2006)
- Rhoda Scott Lady Quartet: Live at the Sunset, Paris (Must Record MR-6204 [3660341 237496], 2008)
- Soul Sisters Come Together in Paris (w/La Velle) (Must Record MR-6205 [3660341 350638], 2009)
- The Look of Love: A Tribute to Burt Bacharach (with Patrick Saussois) (Djaz [Saussois' label] DJ-577, 2009)
- Beyond the Sea (Doodlin' DR-013, 2010)
- Organ Masters: Rhoda Scott Invites Emmanuel Bex, Thierry Eliez, Stefan Patry, Benoît Sourisse (Must Record MR-6213-3, 2010)
- Rock My Boat (with David Linx) (Naive NJ-621311, 2011)
- On the Road Again: Live at Jazz Club Etoile (Ahead AH 830.2, 2016)
- Rhoda Scott Lady Quartet: We Free Queens (Sunset SUN-023, 2017)
- Blanc Cassé (with Christophe Monniot and Jeff Boudreaux) (Sergent Major Company, 2017)
- Time For Love (with Sophie Alour) (Music From Source, 2017)
- Movin' Blues (Sunset SUN-027, 2020)
- Lady All Stars (Sunset SUN-038, 2022)
- Fly Me To The Moon (Live In Eaubonne) (Black and Blue BB-1096, 2024)

== Compilations ==
- Succès de L'Orgue (Barclay 950.065, 1974)
- 16 Grands Succès (Barclay 200.388, 1975)
- Le Disque D'or: Rhoda Scott (Barclay 90.326, 1979)
- Take Five / In the Mood / Summertime... (Barclay 96.083 [2LP], 1980) - note: LP1= previously unreleased material; LP2= compilation of material from 1975-1977.
- Summertime (Verve 847862, 1991) - CD compilation
- Rhoda Scott Live (Verve 847863, 1991) - CD compilation; different from Barclay 91.063
- Rhoda Scott and Guests (Verve 847864, 1991) - CD compilation
- Negro Spirituals (Verve 511477, 1991) - CD compilation; different from Barclay 817102
- Stardust (Verve 511478, 1991) - CD compilation
- Take Five (Verve 511479, 1991) - CD compilation
- Les Orgues de Noël (Verve 527035, 1994) - CD compilation; different from Barclay 90.147
- Paris-New York (Universal 0602527976587 [2CD], 2012) - CD compilation/reissue of Barclay 920.168, 920.350, 90.068
