= There's No Need to Struggle =

Studio album by Horace Silver
- Released: 1983
- Recorded: August 25 & September 1, 1983
- Genre: Jazz
- Label: Silveto
- Producer: Horace Silver

Horace Silver chronology
Spiritualizing the Senses (1983)	There's No Need to Struggle (1983)	Live 1964 (1984)

Professional ratings
Review scores
Source	Rating
Allmusic	3/5 stars

There's No Need to Struggle is an album by jazz pianist Horace Silver, his third released on the Silveto label, featuring performances by Silver with Eddie Harris, Bobby Shew, Ralph Moore, Bob Maize, and Carl Burnett with vocals by Weaver Copeland and Mahmu Pearl. The Allmusic review awarded the album 3 stars.

== Track listing ==
All compositions and lyrics by Horace Silver

1. "I Don't Know What I'm Gonna Do"
2. "Don't Dwell On Your Problems"
3. "Everything Gonna Be Alright"
4. "There's No Need to Struggle"
5. "Seeking the Plan"
6. "Discovering the Plan"
7. "Fulfilling the Plan"
8. "Happiness and Contentment"

- Recorded in New York City on August 25 & September 1, 1983.

== Personnel ==
- Horace Silver – piano
- Eddie Harris – tenor saxophone
- Bobby Shew – trumpet
- Ralph Moore – tenor saxophone
- Bob Maize – bass
- Carl Burnette – drums
- Weaver Copeland, Mahmu Pearl – vocals
