= Chuck Niles =

American DJ (1927–2004)

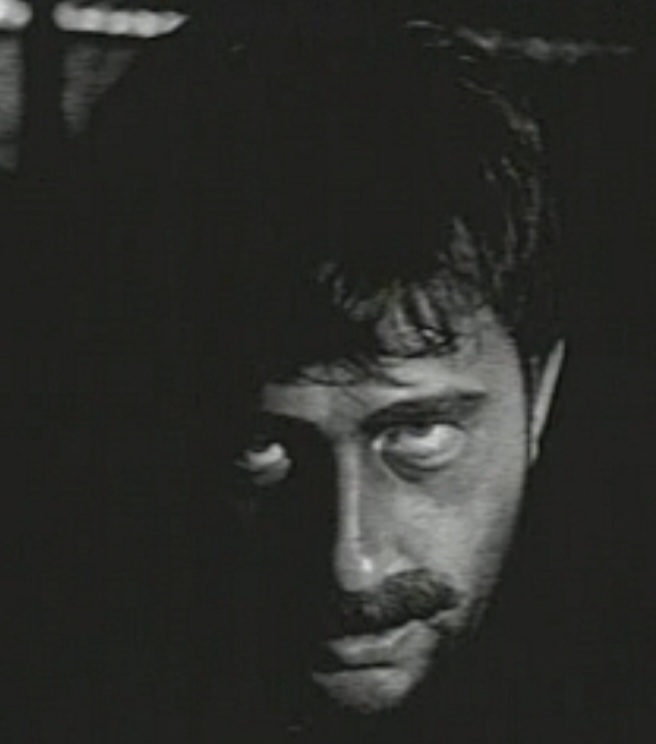
- Niles in Teenage Zombies (1960)
- Born: Charles Neidel; June 24, 1927; Springfield, Massachusetts, U.S.
- Died: March 15, 2004 (aged 76); Santa Monica, California, U.S.
- Education: American International College
- Occupation: Disc jockey
- Years active: 1951–2004
- Spouse: Nancy Neidel (m. 1964)
- Children: 1 Tracy Neidel

Chuck Niles (born Charles Neidel; June 24, 1927 – March 15, 2004) was a well-known jazz disc jockey who became the only jazz DJ to be on the Hollywood Walk of Fame.

== Biography ==
Niles was born in Springfield, Massachusetts, and first gained notoriety on Los Angeles commercial jazz station KNOB-FM in 1957. In 1965, he moved to KBCA-FM (later KKGO). After that station switched formats, he took over the afternoon drive slot at the non-commercial, publicly supported KLON-FM (now KKJZ) on the campus of Cal State Long Beach. Chuck Niles was a DJ for KKJZ from 1990 until his death in Santa Monica in 2004.

Horace Silver ("The Hippest Cat in Hollywood'), Louie Bellson ("Niles Blues"), and Bob Florence ("Bebop Charlie", "Nilestones"), and others have written tunes for "Carlitos Niles".

He also appeared in small parts in several films. In 1958, he appeared as Ivan the Zombie in the Jerry Warren cult film Teenage Zombies. He later said of the film, "I was just walking around like Frankenstein, that's all, no lines, just 'gluergugluergu,' and I'm pretty good at that... the movie was just terrible".

In 2004, at the age of 76, Niles died of complications from a stroke.
