= Thad Jones/Mel Lewis Orchestra with Rhoda Scott =

Thad Jones & Mel Lewis Orchestra with Rhoda Scott

Studio album by Rhoda Scott, Thad Jones/Mel Lewis Jazz Orchestra
- Recorded: 1976 June, New York City
- Genre: Jazz
- Length: 35:12 (original release)
- Label: Barclay (France)

Rhoda Scott chronology
Ballades No.3 (1975)	Rhoda Scott in New York (1976)	Rhoda Scott + Kenny Clarke (1977)

Thad Jones/Mel Lewis Jazz Orchestra chronology
New Life (1976)	Thad Jones/Mel Lewis Orchestra With Rhoda Scott (1976)	Live in Munich (1976)

Alternative cover/title

Thad Jones/Mel Lewis Orchestra With Rhoda Scott (a.k.a. Rhoda Scott in New York with the Thad Jones/Mel Lewis Orchestra) is a 1976 big band jazz album recorded by jazz organist Rhoda Scott with the Thad Jones/Mel Lewis Jazz Orchestra and released on the Barclay (France) record label.

== Track listing ==
LP side A:

1. "Mach 2" – 4:30
2. "Tanikka" – 4:29
3. "Rhoda Map" (Thad Jones) – 5:00
4. "R And R" – 4:14

LP side B:

1. "Charlotte's Waltz" – 4:30
2. "Walkin About" – 5:07
3. "Take A Ladder" – 7:22

Bonus tracks on later CD release:

8. "La La Solitude" (Pierre Delanoë) – 4:22
9. "Quand Je Monte Chez Toi" (Jean Broussolle) – 3:58

All songs composed by Rhoda Scott except as noted

== Personnel ==
- Rhoda Scott – Hammond organ
- Thad Jones – flugelhorn (except track A1)
- Mel Lewis – drums
- Harold Danko – piano
- Bob Bowman – bass
- Jerry Dodgion – alto saxophone, flute
- Larry Schneider – tenor saxophone, clarinet
- Greg Herbert – tenor saxophone, flute, clarinet
- Ed Xiques – alto saxophone, flute
- Pepper Adams – baritone saxophone
- Al Porcino – trumpet
- Cecil Bridgewater – trumpet
- Earl Gardner – trumpet
- Lynn Nicholson – trumpet
- Billy Campbell – trombone
- Clifford Adams – trombone
- Earl McIntyre – trombone
- John Mosca – trombone

== References and external links ==
- Barclay 90068
- Barclay 813590-2
- Universal Jazz 0 602498 112069
- discogs.com
- RhodaScott.com
- Classics and Jazz.co.uk
