= That Healin' Feelin' (Horace Silver album) =

Studio album by Horace Silver Quintet
- Released: End of October 1970
- Recorded: April 8 & June 18, 1970
- Studios: Van Gelder, Englewood Cliffs, NJ
- Genre: Jazz
- Length: 36:23
- Labels: Blue Note; BST 84352
- Producers: Francis Wolff, George Butler

Horace Silver chronology
You Gotta Take a Little Love (1969)	That Healin' Feelin' (1970)	Total Response (1971)

That Healin' Feelin' (subtitled The United States of Mind Phase 1) is an album by jazz pianist Horace Silver, released on the Blue Note label in 1970 and featuring performances by Silver with Randy Brecker, George Coleman, Houston Person, Bob Cranshaw, Jimmy Lewis, Mickey Roker and Idris Muhammad with vocals by Andy Bey, Gail Nelson and Jackie Verdell. It is the first of a trilogy of albums later compiled on CD as The United States of Mind.

== Reception ==
Professional ratings
Review scores
Source	Rating
AllMusic	4/5 stars

The AllMusic review by Ron Wynn states: "Lyrics a bit to the pretentious side; music overcomes it".

== Track listing ==
All compositions by Horace Silver

1. "That Healin' Feelin" - 3:54
2. "The Happy Medium" - 4:58
3. "The Show Has Begun" - 4:11
4. "Love Vibrations" - 4:03
5. "Peace" - 3:26
6. "Permit Me to Introduce You to Yourself" - 3:13
7. "Wipe Away the Evil" - 4:15
8. "Nobody Knows" - 4:12
9. "There's Too Much to Be Done" - 4:11

Recorded on April 8 (1–5) and June 18 (6–9), 1970.

== Personnel ==
Tracks 1–5

- Horace Silver - piano, electric piano
- Randy Brecker - trumpet, flugelhorn
- George Coleman - tenor saxophone
- Bob Cranshaw - electric bass
- Mickey Roker - drums
- Andy Bey - vocals (2–5)

Tracks 6–9

- Horace Silver - piano, electric piano
- Randy Brecker - trumpet, flugelhorn
- Houston Person - tenor saxophone
- Jimmy Lewis - electric bass
- Idris Muhammad - drums
- Gail Nelson (8), Jackie Verdell (6,7,9) - vocals
