= Silver 'n Voices =

Studio album by Horace Silver
- Released: 1976
- Recorded: September 24, October 1, 19 & 22, 1976
- Genre: Jazz
- Label: Blue Note
- Producer: George Butler

Horace Silver chronology
Silver 'n Wood (1976)	Silver 'n Voices (1976)	Silver 'n Percussion (1977)

Professional ratings
Review scores
Source	Rating
Allmusic	2/5 stars
The Rolling Stone Jazz Record Guide	2/5 stars

Silver 'n Voices is an album by jazz pianist Horace Silver released on the Blue Note label in 1976, featuring performances by Silver with Tom Harrell, Bob Berg, Ron Carter, and Al Foster, with an overdubbed choir directed by Alan Copeland featuring Monica Mancini, Avery Sommers, Joyce Copeland, Richard Page, and Dale Verdugo. The Allmusic review by Scott Yanow awarded the album 2 stars and states: "The self-help lyrics get a bit cloying and the voices simply weigh down the music but there are some good solos along the way".

== Track listing ==
All compositions and lyrics by Horace Silver

1. "Out of the Night (Came You)" – 5:50
2. "Togetherness" – 5:46
3. "I Will Always Love You" – 3:37
4. "Mood for Maude" – 5:27
5. "Incentive" – 5:19
6. "New York Lament" – 4:35
7. "All in Time" – 6:05
8. "Freeing My Mind" – 4:28

- Recorded at A&R Studios, NYC on September 24 (tracks 4–7) and October 1 (tracks 1–3 & 8), 1976 with choir recorded at Hollywood Sound Recorders, Los Angeles, CA, on October 19 & 22, 1976.

== Personnel ==
- Horace Silver – piano, arrangements
- Tom Harrell – trumpet
- Bob Berg – tenor saxophone
- Ron Carter – bass
- Al Foster – drums
- Monica Mancini, Avery Sommers, Joyce Copeland, Richard Page, Dale Verdugo – vocals
- Alan Copeland – vocals, musical director
