= Opus de Funk (composition) =

Composition by Horace Silver

from the album Horace Silver Trio, Vol. 2 and Art Blakey – Sabu
- Recorded: November 23, 1953
- Studio: WOR Studios, New York, U.S.
- Genre: Jazz
- Label: Blue Note
- Composer: Horace Silver
- Producer: Alfred Lion

"Opus de Funk" (sometimes "Opus De Funk") is a composition by jazz pianist Horace Silver. The original version, by Silver's trio, was recorded on November 23, 1953.

== Composition ==
It is "a typical Silver creation: advanced in its harmonic structure and general approach but with a catchy tune and finger-snapping beat." This was an early use of the word "funk" in a song title. In 2004, Silver reported that "Opus de Funk" was one of only three of his compositions that he did not own the rights to.

== Original recording and release ==
The piece was first recorded on November 23, 1953, by the Horace Silver Trio, of Silver (piano), Percy Heath (bass), and Art Blakey (drums). It was released with other Silver and Blakey recordings as part of the Blue Note Records 10-inch Horace Silver Trio, Vol. 2 and Art Blakey – Sabu, then on the 12-inch Horace Silver Trio and Art Blakey–Sabu. The track was also released as a single around 1954.

== Later versions ==
As of 2014, more than 60 versions of the song have been recorded.
