= The Hardbop Grandpop =

Studio album by Horace Silver
- Released: 1996
- Recorded: February 29–March 1, 1996
- Genre: Jazz
- Label: Impulse!
- Producer: Horace Silver

Horace Silver chronology
Pencil Packin' Papa (1994)	The Hardbop Grandpop (1996)	A Prescription for the Blues (1997)

Professional ratings
Review scores
Source	Rating
Allmusic	4.5/5 stars

The Hardbop Grandpop is an album by jazz pianist Horace Silver released on the Impulse! label in 1996 featuring performances by Silver with Claudio Roditi, Steve Turre, Michael Brecker, Ronnie Cuber, Ron Carter, and Lewis Nash. The Allmusic review by Scott Yanow awarded the album 4½ stars and calls the album "One of Horace Silver's finest recordings in his post-Blue Note era".

== Track listing ==
All compositions by Horace Silver

1. "I Want You" - 5:15
2. "The Hippest Cat in Hollywood" - 6:43
3. "Gratitude" - 5:38
4. "Hawkin'" - 6:17
5. "I Got the Blues in Santa Cruz" - 8:05
6. "We've Got Silver at Six" - 7:05
7. "The Hardbop Grandpop" - 5:20
8. "The Lady from Johannesburg" - 6:02
9. "Serenade to a Teakettle" - 6:24
10. "Diggin' on Dexter" - 5:40

- Recorded in NYC on February 29-March 1, 1996.

== Personnel ==
- Horace Silver - piano
- Claudio Roditi - trumpet, flugelhorn
- Steve Turre - trombone
- Michael Brecker - tenor saxophone
- Ronnie Cuber - baritone saxophone
- Ron Carter - bass
- Lewis Nash - drums
