= Spiritualizing the Senses =

Studio album by Horace Silver
- Released: 1983
- Recorded: January 19, 1983
- Genre: Jazz
- Label: Silveto
- Producer: Horace Silver

Horace Silver chronology
Guides to Growing Up (1981)	Spiritualizing the Senses (1983)	There's No Need to Struggle (1983)

Professional ratings
Review scores
Source	Rating
Allmusic	2.5/5 stars
The Rolling Stone Jazz Record Guide	5/5 stars

Spiritualizing the Senses is an album by jazz pianist Horace Silver, his second released on the Silveto label, featuring performances by Silver with Eddie Harris, Bobby Shew, Ralph Moore, Bob Maize, and Carl Burnett.

== Reception ==
The Allmusic review by Ron Wynn awarded the album 2½ stars and simply states: "Nice, characteristic hard bop on his own label".

== Track listing ==
All compositions and lyrics by Horace Silver

1. "Smelling Our Attitude"
2. "Seeing with Perception"
3. "The Sensitive Touch"
4. "Exercising Taste and Good Judgement"
5. "Hearing and Understanding"
6. "Moving Forward with Confidence"

- Recorded in New York City on January 19, 1983.

== Personnel ==
- Horace Silver - piano
- Eddie Harris - tenor saxophone
- Bobby Shew - trumpet
- Ralph Moore - tenor saxophone
- Bob Maize - bass
- Carl Burnette - drums
