= Guides to Growing Up =

Studio album by Horace Silver
- Released: 1981
- Recorded: September 18 & 29, 1981
- Genre: Jazz
- Label: Silveto
- Producer: Horace Silver

Horace Silver chronology
Silver 'n Strings Play the Music of the Spheres (1979)	Guides to Growing Up (1981)	Spiritualizing the Senses (1983)

Professional ratings
Review scores
Source	Rating
The Rolling Stone Jazz Record Guide	4/5 stars

Guides to Growing Up is an album by jazz pianist Horace Silver, his first released on the Silveto label, featuring performances by Silver with Eddie Harris, Joe Diorio, Bob Magnusson, and Roy McCurdy, with recitations by Bill Cosby and vocals by Weaver Copeland, and Mahmu Pearl.

In a 1981 interview Silver stated: "This is jazz, and actually it's adult music. But it's music for everybody. And adults can listen to it and enjoy it as well as the kids! But the titles of the tunes and the lyrics and recitation is dedicated to the kids, so they can listen to and learn good principles of life."

== Track listing ==
All compositions and lyrics by Horace Silver

1. "Accepting Responsibility"
2. "Reaching Our Goals in Life"
3. "Learning to Be Unselfish"
4. "Helping Others"
5. "Finding Good Rules to Live By"
6. "Honesty and Self Control"
7. "Managing Your Money"
8. "The Things That Really Matter"

- Recorded in NYC on September 18 & 29, 1981.

== Personnel ==
- Horace Silver – piano
- Eddie Harris – tenor saxophone
- Joe Diorio – guitar
- Bob Magnusson – bass
- Roy McCurdy – drums
- Bill Cosby – recitation
- Weaver Copeland, Mahmu Pearl – vocals
