= A Prescription for the Blues =

Studio album by Horace Silver
- Released: October 1997
- Recorded: May 29–30, 1997
- Genre: Jazz
- Label: Impulse!
- Producer: Horace Silver

Horace Silver chronology
| The Hardbop Grandpop (1996) | A Prescription for the Blues (1997) | Jazz Has a Sense of Humor (1998) |

A Prescription for the Blues is an album by jazz pianist Horace Silver released on the Impulse! label in 1997 featuring performances by Silver with Randy Brecker, Michael Brecker, Ron Carter, and Louis Hayes.

== Reception ==
Professional ratings
Review scores
| Source | Rating |
|---|---|
| Allmusic | 4/5 stars |

The Allmusic review by Scott Yanow awarded the album 4 stars and states: "The funny part about Silver's music is that, no matter who he is paying tribute to (this set includes a song for Lester Young), the style always ends up sounding like Horace Silver, with no real reference to the subject matter... But it is a joy to hear Horace Silver still playing in his prime at the age of 68."

== Track listing ==
All compositions by Horace Silver

1. "A Prescription for the Blues" – 5:12
2. "Whenever Lester Plays the Blues" – 6:35
3. "You Gotta Shake That Thing" – 5:16
4. "Yodel Lady Blues" – 6:42
5. "Brother John and Brother Gene" – 4:43
6. "Free at Last" – 6:27
7. "Walk On" – 6:26
8. "Sunrise in Malibu" – 5:01
9. "Doctor Jazz" – 5:31
  - Recorded in NYC on May 29 & 30, 1997.

== Personnel ==
- Horace Silver – piano
- Randy Brecker – trumpet
- Michael Brecker – tenor saxophone
- Ron Carter – bass
- Louis Hayes – drums
