= Live at Newport '58 =

Live album by Horace Silver
- Released: February 5, 2008
- Recorded: July 6, 1958
- Genre: Hard bop
- Length: 44:44
- Label: Blue Note
- Producer: Michael Cuscuna

Horace Silver chronology
Rockin' with Rachmaninoff (2003)	Live at Newport '58 (2008)	June 1977 (2014)

Live at Newport '58 is a live album by jazz pianist Horace Silver. The album was recorded on July 6, 1958 at the Newport Jazz Festival. Blue Note Records released the album in 2008. It is one of the few officially released live albums with Silver as bandleader.

Producer Michael Cuscuna discovered Silver's Newport performance while auditioning tapes at the Library of Congress. He was able to locate a three-track master recording in Columbia Records' archives, as Columbia producer George Avakian had supervised the recording of the entire 1958 Newport Festival.

== Performance and reception ==
The personnel lineup that appears on this album was relatively short-lived. Junior Cook and Louis Hayes were the only two sidemen remaining from the previous edition of the Quintet. Trumpeter Louis Smith, who replaced Donald Byrd, was with the group for only a short time before Blue Mitchell replaced him, and this album presents Smith's only full performance with the group. However, critic Jeff Tamarkin writes that "[Smith's] playing on this date is monstrous", and The Penguin Guide to Jazz notes that "any thought that Smith was a stop-gap is blown away at once." On the final track, "'Senor Blues', he pushes the leader into one of his best, and most forceful, recorded solos

Professional ratings
Review scores
Source	Rating
Allmusic	4/5 stars
Penguin Guide to Jazz	3/3 stars 1/1 star

The Penguin Guide to Jazz noted that "a lot of archive rediscoveries are just ticks in collectors' boxes. This one has real musical value and high excitement: iconic hard bop."

== Track listing ==
All music is composed by Horace Silver.

No.	Title	Length
1.	"Introduction by Willis Conover"	00:44
2.	"Tippin'"	13:10
3.	"The Outlaw"	11:47
4.	"Señor Blues"	08:42
5.	"Cool Eyes"	10:21

== Personnel ==
- Louis Smith – trumpet
- Junior Cook – tenor saxophone
- Horace Silver – piano
- Gene Taylor – bass
- Louis Hayes – drums
