= In Pursuit of the 27th Man =

Studio album by Horace Silver
- Released: Mid-March 1973
- Recorded: October 6 & November 10, 1972
- Studios: Van Gelder Studio, Englewood Cliffs, NJ
- Genre: Jazz
- Length: 40:43
- Labels: Blue Note; BN-LA054-F
- Producer: George Butler

Horace Silver chronology
All (1972)	In Pursuit of the 27th Man (1973)	Silver 'n Brass (1975)

In Pursuit of the 27th Man is a studio album by jazz pianist Horace Silver, released by Blue Note Records in 1973, featuring performances by Silver with David Friedman, Randy Brecker, Michael Brecker, Bob Cranshaw, and Mickey Roker.

== Reception ==
Professional ratings
Review scores
Source	Rating
AllMusic	4/5 stars
The Penguin Guide to Jazz	3/4 stars
The Rolling Stone Jazz Record Guide	3/5 stars

The AllMusic review by Scott Yanow awarded the album four stars, describing it as "a very unusual sound for a Horace Silver set. But no matter what the instrumentation, the style is pure Silver, hard-driving and melodic hard bop with a strong dose of funky soul".

== Track listing ==
All tracks are written by Horace Silver except where noted.

No.	Title	Writer(s)	Length
1.	"Liberated Brother"	Weldon Irvine	5:23
2.	"Kathy"	Ray Evans; Jay Livingston; Moacir Santos	4:17
3.	"Gregory Is Here"		6:21
4.	"Summer in Central Park"		4:41
5.	"Nothin' Can Stop Me Now"		5:15
6.	"In Pursuit of the 27th Man"		9:44
7.	"Strange Vibes"		5:02
Total length:			40:43

- Recorded on October 6 (tracks 2, 4, 6 & 7) and November 10 (tracks 1, 3 & 5), 1972

== Personnel ==
- Horace Silver – piano
- Randy Brecker – trumpet, flugelhorn (1, 3 & 5)
- Michael Brecker – tenor saxophone (1, 3 & 5)
- David Friedman – vibraphone (2, 4, 6 & 7)
- Bob Cranshaw – electric bass
- Mickey Roker – drums
