= It's Got to Be Funky =

Studio album by Horace Silver
- Released: 1993
- Recorded: February 8 & 9, 1993
- Genre: Jazz
- Label: Columbia
- Producer: Horace Silver

Horace Silver chronology
Music to Ease Your Disease (1988)	It's Got to Be Funky (1993)	Pencil Packin' Papa (1994)

Professional ratings
Review scores
Source	Rating
Allmusic	4/5 stars

It's Got to Be Funky is an album by jazz pianist Horace Silver, his first release on the Columbia label since Silver's Blue (1956), featuring performances by Silver with Oscar Brashear, Ron Stout, Bob Summers, Bob McChesney, Maurice Spears, Suzette Moriarty, Eddie Harris, Branford Marsalis, Red Holloway, Bob Maize, and Carl Burnett, with vocals by Andy Bey. The Allmusic review by Scott Yanow awarded the album 4 stars and states: "After a 13-year period in which he mostly recorded for his private Silveto label, pianist/composer Horace Silver was rediscovered by Columbia for this session... All of the music (except for a remake of "Song for My Father") was new and served as proof that the master of jazz-funk had not lost his stuff".

== Track listing ==
All compositions and lyrics by Horace Silver

1. "Funky Bunky" – 7:31
2. "Dufus Rufus" – 5:34
3. "The Lunceford Legacy" – 7:03
4. "The Hillbilly Bebopper" – 5:28
5. "The Walk Around – Look up and Down Song" – 5:55
6. "It's Got to Be Funky" – 6:45
7. "Basically Blue" – 6:27
8. "Song for My Father" – 8:33
9. "When You're in Love" – 4:30
10. "Put Me in the Basement" – 7:19
11. "Little Mama" – 7:04
12. "Yo' Mama's Mambo" – 3:37

- Recorded in NYC on February 8 & 9, 1993.

== Personnel ==
- Horace Silver – piano
- Oscar Brashear, Ron Stout, Bob Summers – trumpet, flugelhorn
- Bob McChesney – trombone
- Maurice Spears – bass trombone
- Suzette Moriarty – French horn
- Eddie Harris, Branford Marsalis – tenor saxophone
- Red Holloway – tenor saxophone alto saxophone
- Bob Maize – bass
- Carl Burnett – drums
- Andy Bey – vocals
