= Silver 'n Strings Play the Music of the Spheres =

Studio album by Horace Silver
- Released: 1980
- Recorded: November 3 & 10, 1978, October 26 & November 2, 1979
- Studios: Van Gelder Studio, Englewood Cliffs, NJ
- Genre: Jazz
- Label: Blue Note
- Producer: Horace Silver

Horace Silver chronology
Silver 'n Percussion (1977)	Silver 'n Strings Play the Music of the Spheres (1980)	Guides to Growing Up (1981)

Silver 'n Strings Play the Music of the Spheres is an album by jazz pianist Horace Silver, his final released on the Blue Note label. It features performances by Silver with Tom Harrell, Larry Schneider, Ron Carter, and Al Foster, with vocals by Gregory Hines, Brenda Alford, Carol Lynn Maillard, and Chapman Roberts, and an overdubbed string section conducted by Wade Marcus.

== Reception ==
Professional ratings
Review scores
Source	Rating
AllMusic	2/5 stars
The Rolling Stone Jazz Record Guide	4/5 stars
DownBeat	5/5 stars

The AllMusic review by Scott Yanow stated: "He was never as strong a lyricist as he was a composer and pianist so the vocals weigh down the music a bit. The songtitles probably kept a few of these pieces from becoming better-known".

== Track listing ==
All compositions and lyrics by Horace Silver

Side One:

1. "(The Physical Sphere) The Soul and Its Expression Part One: The Search for Direction" –
2. "(The Physical Sphere) The Soul and Its Expression Part Two: Direction Discovered" –
3. "(The Physical Sphere) The Soul and Its Expression Part Three: We All Have a Part to Play" –

Side Two:

1. "(The Physical Sphere – continued) The Soul and Its Progress Throughout the Spheres Part One: Self Portrait No. 1 (Written 1973)" –
2. "(The Physical Sphere – continued) The Soul and Its Progress Throughout the Spheres Part Two: Self Portrait No. 2 (Written 1978)" –
3. "(The Physical Sphere – continued) The Soul and Its Progress Throughout the Spheres Part Three: Self Portrait of the Aspiring Self (Written 1978)" –
4. "(The Mental Sphere – Conscious Mind) The Soul's Awareness of Its Character Part One: Character Analysis" –
5. "(The Mental Sphere – Conscious Mind) The Soul's Awareness of Its Character Part Two: Negative Patterns of the Subconscious" –
6. "(The Mental Sphere – Conscious Mind) The Soul's Awareness of Its Character Part Three: The Conscious and Its Desire for Change" –

Side Three:

1. "(The Mental Sphere – Sub-Conscious Mind) The Pygmalion Process Part One: Inner Feelings" –
2. "(The Mental Sphere – Sub-Conscious Mind) The Pygmalion Process Part Two: Friends" –
3. "(The Mental Sphere – Sub-Conscious Mind) The Pygmalion Process Part Three: Empathy" –
4. "(The Mental Sphere – Sub-Conscious Mind) The Pygmalion Process Part Four: Optimism" –
5. "(The Mental Sphere – Sub-Conscious Mind) The Pygmalion Process Part Five: Expansion" –

Side Four:

1. "(The Spiritual Sphere) The Soul in Communion with the Creator Part One: Communion with the Creator" –
2. "(The Spiritual Sphere) The Soul in Communion with the Creator Part Two: The Creator Guides Us" –
3. "(The Spiritual Sphere) The Soul in Communion with the Creator Part Three: Progress, Through Dedication and Discipline" –
4. "(The Spiritual Sphere) The Soul in Communion with the Creator Part Four: We Expect Positive Results" –

- Recorded at Rudy Van Gelder Studio, Englewood Cliffs, NJ, November 3, 1978 (Side One), November 10, 1978 (Side Four), October 26, 1979 (Side Three), November 2, 1979 (Side Two) with strings recorded on December 10, 1979.

== Personnel ==
- Horace Silver – piano, arranger
- Wade Marcus – arranger, conductor
- Dale Oehler – arranger
- Tom Harrell – trumpet
- Larry Schneider – tenor saxophone
- Ron Carter – bass
- Al Foster – drums
- Gregory Hines – vocals (Side One)
- Brenda Alford, Carol Lynn Maillard, Chapman Roberts – vocals (Side Three)
- Guy Lumia – concertmaster
- Aaron Rosand, Marvin Morganstern, Paul Winter, Lewis Eley, Peter Dimitriades, Louann Montesi, Harry Glickman – violin
- Harold Coletta, Harry Zaratzian, Seymour Berman, Theodore Israel – viola
- Seymour Barab, Jonathan Abramowitz – cello
- Gene Bianco – harp
