= Music to Ease Your Disease =

Studio album by Horace Silver
- Released: 1988
- Recorded: March 31, 1988
- Genre: Jazz
- Label: Silveto
- Producer: Horace Silver

Horace Silver chronology
The Continuity of Spirit (1985)	Music to Ease Your Disease (1988)	It's Got to Be Funky (1993)

Professional ratings
Review scores
Source	Rating
Allmusic	3/5 stars

Music to Ease Your Disease is an album by jazz pianist Horace Silver, his fifth and final release on the Silveto label, featuring performances by Silver with Clark Terry, Junior Cook, Ray Drummond, and Billy Hart, with vocals by Andy Bey.

== Reception ==
The Allmusic review by Scott Yanow awarded the album 3 stars and states: "Horace Silver has long been a believer in the self-help holistic movement and this has been reflected in the lyrics he has written during the past decade... However there are plenty of strong instrumental moments from an all-star quintet that includes pianist Silver, flugelhornist Clark Terry, tenor-saxophonist Junior Cook, bassist Ray Drummond and drummer Billy Hart, and for that reason this is the strongest release on Silveto to date."

== Track listing ==
All compositions and lyrics by Horace Silver

1. "Prologue"
2. "Hangin' Loose"
3. "The Respiratory Story"
4. "Tie Your Dreams to a Star"
5. "Music to Ease Your Disease"
6. "The Philanthropic View"
7. "What is the Sinus Minus"
8. "Epilogue"

- Recorded in New York City on March 31, 1988.

== Personnel ==
- Horace Silver – piano
- Clark Terry – trumpet, flugelhorn
- Junior Cook – tenor saxophone
- Ray Drummond – bass
- Billy Hart – drums
- Andy Bey – vocals
