= Silver 'n Brass =

Studio album by Horace Silver
- Released: 1975
- Recorded: January 10 & January 17, 1975
- Genre: Jazz
- Label: Blue Note
- Producer: George Butler

Horace Silver chronology
In Pursuit of the 27th Man (1972)	Silver 'n Brass (1975)	Silver 'n Wood (1976)

Professional ratings
Review scores
Source	Rating
Allmusic	3/5 stars

Silver 'n Brass is an album by jazz pianist Horace Silver released on the Blue Note label in 1975, featuring performances by Silver with Tom Harrell, Bob Berg, Ron Carter, Al Foster, Bob Cranshaw, and Bernard Purdie with an overdubbed brass section arranged by Wade Marcus featuring Oscar Brashear, Bobby Bryant, Vincent DeRosa, Frank Rosolino, Maurice Spears, Jerome Richardson, and Buddy Collette.

The Allmusic review by Scott Yanow awarded the album 3 stars and states: "Although there are tributes to Tadd Dameron ('Dameron's Dance') and Duke Ellington ('The Sophisticated Hippie'), the music is recognizably Silver – funky hard bop."

== Track listing ==
All compositions by Horace Silver

1. "Barbara" -
2. "Dameron's Dance" -
3. "Adjustment" -
4. "Mysticism" -
5. "Kissin' Cousins" -
6. "The Sophisticated Hippie" -

- Recorded at A&R Studios, New York City, on January 10 (tracks 2, 3, 5 & 6) & 17 ("Kissin' Cousins", "The Sophisticated Hippie"), 1975, with overdubs recorded at Wally Heider Sound Studio III, Los Angeles, CA, in 1975.

== Personnel ==
- Horace Silver - piano
- Tom Harrell - trumpet
- Bob Berg - tenor saxophone
- Ron Carter - bass (tracks 1–4)
- Bob Cranshaw - bass (tracks 5 & 6)
- Al Foster - drums (tracks 1–4)
- Bernard Purdie - drums (tracks 5 & 6)
- Oscar Brashear, Bobby Bryant - trumpet, flugelhorn
- Vincent DeRosa - french horn
- Frank Rosolino - trombone
- Maurice Spears - bass trombone
- Jerome Richardson - alto saxophone, soprano saxophone, flute
- Buddy Collette - alto saxophone, flute
- Wade Marcus - arranger
