= Salome Bey =

American-born Canadian singer-songwriter (1933–2020)

Background information
- Born: October 10, 1933; Newark, New Jersey, U.S.
- Died: August 8, 2020 (aged 86); Toronto, Ontario, Canada
- Genres: Soul, Jazz, Gospel
- Occupation(s): Musician, songwriter, record producer
- Instrument: Vocalist
- Years active: 1964–2011
- Formerly of: Horace Silver, Andy Bey

Salome Bey CM (October 10, 1933 – August 8, 2020) (Note: While The Canadian Encyclopedia gives her year of birth as 1939, other sources say she was born in 1933 or 1944.) was a U.S.-born Canadian singer-songwriter, composer, and actress who lived in Toronto, Ontario, from 1966.

In 2005, she was made an honorary Member of the Order of Canada. In 2022 she was honoured by Canada Post with a commemorative postage stamp for her contributions to Canadian music and theatre.

== Biography ==
Born to a middle-class black family in New Jersey, Bey formed a vocal group with her brother Andy Bey and sister Geraldine Bey (de Haas), known as Andy and the Bey Sisters, performing in local clubs and touring North America and Europe. After moving to Toronto in 1964 and playing the jazz club circuit, she became known as "Canada's First Lady of Blues". Bey appeared on Broadway in Your Arms Too Short to Box with God, for which she was nominated for a Grammy Award for her work on the cast album. She put together a blues & jazz cabaret show on the history of black music, Indigo – which earned her the Dora Mavor Moore Award for outstanding performance. The show was later taped for TV networks.

Bey recorded two albums with Horace Silver, and released live albums of her performances with the Montreal Jubilation Gospel Choir and at the Montreux Jazz Festival.

She was part of the Canadian supergroup Northern Lights which performed the charity single "Tears Are Not Enough" in 1985. Bey can be seen in the music video for the song singing the line "Every woman, child and man" with Mark Holmes of Platinum Blonde and Lorraine Segato of The Parachute Club.

She received the Toronto Arts Award for her contributions to the performing arts in 1992, and the Martin Luther King Jr. Award for lifetime achievement from the Black Theatre Workshop of Montreal in 1996.

Beginning in her early sixties, Bey began showing signs of dementia. As of 2011, her illness had progressed to the point that she could no longer perform.

Bey was a member of the Canadian charity Artists Against Racism.

== Personal life and death ==
She married Howard Berkeley Matthews on April 7, 1964; he was most noted for partnering with Dave Mann, Archie Alleyne and John Henry Jackson in The Underground Railroad, a soul food restaurant in Toronto.

They had three children, including the singer SATE, formerly known as Saidah Baba Talibah, and singer/performance artist Jacintha Tuku Matthews (tUkU). Matthews died in August 2016 at the age of 80, and Bey died August 8, 2020, at the age of 86.
