= Jazz Has a Sense of Humor =

Album by Horace Silver

Studio album by Horace Silver
- Released: August 1999
- Recorded: December 17–18, 1998
- Genre: Jazz
- Length: 47:30
- Label: Verve
- Producer: Horace Silver

Horace Silver chronology
A Prescription for the Blues (1997)	Jazz Has a Sense of Humor (1999)	Rockin' with Rachmaninoff (2003)

Professional ratings
Review scores
Source	Rating
Allmusic	4/5 stars

Jazz Has a Sense of Humor is the last-recorded studio album by jazz pianist Horace Silver, released on the Verve label in 1998. The album features performances by Silver with Ryan Kisor, Jimmy Greene, John Webber, and Willie Jones III.

== Reception ==
The Allmusic review by Michael G. Nastos awarded the album 4 stars and states: "In this set of nine originals, the Horace Silver touch is clearly evident: happy, strong melodies; groovin' beats; Silver's deft, deliberate, bluesy piano comping and boppin' leads... His tunefully familiar, head-noddin' original funk is as vital as ever and sounds pretty fresh compared to some of the trite neo-bop being reprocessed this past decade. Silver's light, spare, and soulful style is a sound for sore ears, one that has a universal, timeless appeal, crossing generational and commercial barriers. This is well-played music, a specialty Silver has envisioned and realized through the bulk of his career. Highly recommended."

== Track listing ==
All compositions by Horace Silver

1. "Satisfaction Guaranteed" – 5:47
2. "The Mama Suite Part 1: Not Enough Mama" – 5:36
3. "The Mama Suite Part 2: Too Much Mama" – 4:52
4. "The Mama Suite Part 3: Just Right Mama" – 4:07
5. "Philley Millie" – 4:45
6. "Ah-Ma-Tell" – 6:00
7. "I Love Annie's Fanny" – 4:48
8. "Gloria" – 7:34
9. "Where Do I Go from Here?" – 4:01

== Personnel ==
- Horace Silver – piano
- Ryan Kisor – trumpet
- Jimmy Greene – tenor saxophone, soprano saxophone
- John Webber – bass
- Willie Jones III – drums
