= Bob Maize =

American jazz musician (1945–2004)

Bob Maize (January 15, 1945 – November 20, 2004) was an American jazz double bassist born and raised in Ontario California.

Maize played piano from age seven and switched to bass at 13. After moving to San Francisco in 1963, Maize worked in the house bands of many jazz clubs in the city, including Soulville and Bop City. He played with Sonny Stitt, Philly Joe Jones, Vince Guaraldi, Mose Allison, Herb Ellis, Monty Alexander, Anita O'Day, Emily Remler, and Jon Hendricks; he also did a stint in a rock band as a bass guitarist.

He moved to Los Angeles with his family in 1980, where he worked with Concord Jazz All Stars, Scott Hamilton, Dave McKenna, Rosemary Clooney, Mel Tormé and Tal Farlow. Maize also worked with Horace Silver in 1983–84, 1993 (It's Got to Be Funky) and 1995–96. He did a tour of Japan and Europe with Sarah Vaughan in 1985. He continued to play as a sideman in West Coast clubs into the 2000s.

Maize died on November 20, 2004, at Providence St. Joseph Medical Center in Burbank, Los Angeles, after suffering a heart attack at home, according to bassist Putter Smith.

== Discography (as sideman) ==
Year recorded	Leader	Title	Label
1969	Vince Guaraldi	The Eclectic Vince Guaraldi	Contemporary Jazz
1976	Anita O'Day	Live At Mingo's	Trio Records
1979	Dick Johnson	Dick Johnson Plays	Concord Jazz
1979	Monty Alexander	Just In Time	Live At EJ's
1981	Barney Kessel	Jellybeans	Concord Jazz
1981	Emily Remler	Firefly	Concord Records
1981	Dave McKenna	Piano Mover	Concord Jazz
1981	Scott Hamilton	Scott's Budy	Concord Jazz
1982	Al Cohn	Tour De Force	Concord Jazz
1982	Anli Sugano	Love Sketch	Concord Jazz
1982	Herb Ellis	Herb Mix	Concord Jazz
1982	Woody James	Hardcore Jazz	Sea Breeze Jazz
1983	Horace Silver	Spiritualizing the Senses	Silverto
1983	Eiji Kitamura	Seven Stars	Concord Jazz
1985	Tal Farlow	The Legendary Tal Farlow	Concord Jazz
1991	Gildo Mahones	Gildo Mahones Trio	Interplay Records
1994	Lanny Morgan	The Lanny Morgan Quartet	V.O.S.P. Records
1996	Jon Mayer	Do It Like It Is	A-Records
1998	Jon Mayer	Live At The Jazz Bakery	Fresh Sound Records
2001	Wally Leask	Serving Time	LKW Records
