= Horace Silver =

American jazz pianist and composer (1928–2014)

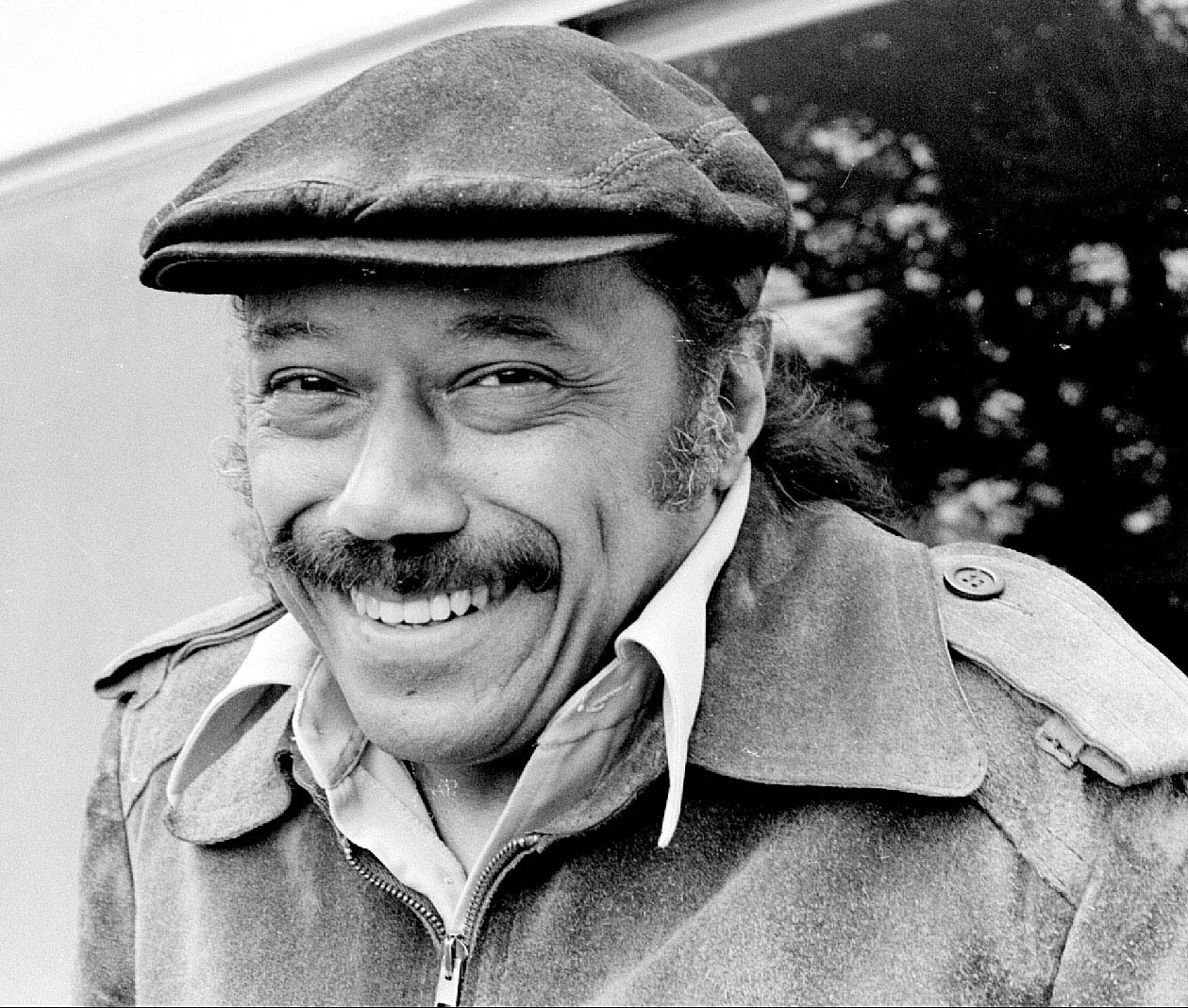
- Silver in 1989; portrait by Dmitri Savitski

Background information
- Born: September 2, 1928; Norwalk, Connecticut, U.S.
- Died: June 18, 2014 (aged 85) New Rochelle, New York, U.S.
- Genres: Jazz; hard bop; mainstream jazz; soul jazz; jazz fusion
- Occupations: Musician; composer; arranger
- Instrument: Piano
- Works: Horace Silver discography
- Years active: 1946–2004
- Labels: Blue Note; Silveto; Emerald; Columbia; Impulse!; Verve

Horace Ward Martin Tavares Silver (Note: According to Silver, his father's surname was originally "Silva", but was changed upon marriage to "Silver", while his own baptismal name was "Horace Ward Silver", which then had his father's middle name added, as well as "Martin" upon his Catholic confirmation, making him Horace Ward Martin Tavares Silver.) (September 2, 1928 – June 18, 2014) was an American jazz pianist, composer, and arranger, particularly in the hard bop style that he helped pioneer in the 1950s.

After playing tenor saxophone and piano at school in Connecticut, Silver got his break on piano when his trio was recruited by Stan Getz in 1950. Silver soon moved to New York City, where he developed a reputation as a composer and for his bluesy playing. Frequent sideman recordings in the mid-1950s helped further, but it was his work with the Jazz Messengers, co-led by Art Blakey, that brought both his writing and playing the most attention. Their album Horace Silver and the Jazz Messengers contained Silver's first hit, "The Preacher". After leaving Blakey in 1956, Silver formed his own quintet, with what became the standard small group line-up of tenor saxophone, trumpet, piano, bass, and drums. Their public performances and frequent recordings for Blue Note Records increased Silver's popularity, even through changes of personnel. His most successful album was Song for My Father, made with two iterations of the quintet in 1963 and 1964.

Several changes occurred in the early 1970s: Silver disbanded his group to spend more time with his wife and to concentrate on composing; he included lyrics in his recordings; and his interest in spiritualism developed. The last two of these were often combined, resulting in commercially unsuccessful releases such as The United States of Mind series. Silver left Blue Note after 28 years, founded his own record label, and scaled back his touring in the 1980s, relying in part on royalties from his compositions for income. In 1993, he returned to major record labels, releasing five albums before gradually withdrawing from public view due to health problems.

As a player, Silver transitioned from bebop to hard bop by stressing melody rather than complex harmony, and combined clean and often humorous right-hand lines with darker notes and chords in a near-perpetual left-hand rumble. His compositions similarly emphasized catchy melodies, but often also contained dissonant harmonies. Many of his varied repertoire of songs, including "Doodlin'", "Peace", and "Sister Sadie", became jazz standards that continue to be played widely. His considerable legacy encompasses his influence on other pianists and composers, and the development of young jazz talents who appeared in his bands over the course of four decades.

== Early life ==
Horace Silver was born on September 2, 1928, in Norwalk, Connecticut, United States. His mother, Gertrude, was from Connecticut; his father, John Tavares Silver, was born on the island of Maio, Cape Verde, and emigrated to the United States as a young man. (Note: This account of his father's early life is widely reported. The U.S. census of 1930 gives his name as "John M. Silva" and his birthplace as "Porto [Puerto] Rico".) She was a maid and sang in a church choir; he worked for a tire company. Horace had a much older half-brother, Eugene Fletcher, from his mother's first marriage, and was the third child for his parents, after John, who lived to six months, and Maria, who was stillborn.

Silver began playing the piano in his childhood and had classical music lessons. His father taught him the folk music of Cape Verde. At the age of 11, Silver became interested in becoming a musician, after hearing the Jimmie Lunceford orchestra. His early piano influences included the styles of boogie-woogie and the blues, the pianists Nat King Cole, Thelonious Monk, Bud Powell, Art Tatum, and Teddy Wilson, as well as some jazz horn players.

Silver graduated from St. Mary's Grammar School in 1943. From ninth grade, he played Lester Young-influenced tenor saxophone in the Norwalk High School band and orchestra. Silver played gigs locally on both piano and tenor saxophone while still at school. He was rejected for military service by a draft board examination that concluded that he had an excessively curved spine, which also interfered with his saxophone playing. Around 1946, he moved to Hartford, Connecticut, to take up a regular job as pianist in a nightclub.

== Later life and career ==
=== 1950–55 ===
Silver's break came in 1950, when his trio backed saxophonist Stan Getz at a club in Hartford – Getz liked Silver's band and recruited them to tour with him. The saxophonist also gave Silver his recording debut, in December 1950, for a quartet date. After about a year, Silver was replaced as pianist in Getz's band and he moved to New York City. There, working as a freelance, he quickly built a reputation, based on his compositions and bluesy playing. He worked for short periods with tenor saxophonists Lester Young and Coleman Hawkins, before meeting altoist Lou Donaldson, with whom he developed his bebop understanding. Donaldson made his first recording on Blue Note Records in 1952, with Silver on piano, Gene Ramey on bass, and Art Taylor on drums. Later that year, another Blue Note quartet session was booked for Donaldson, with Art Blakey replacing Taylor, but the saxophonist withdrew and producer–owner Alfred Lion offered Silver the studio time for a trio recording. Most of the tracks recorded at it were Silver originals, and he went on to stay with Blue Note as a leader for the following 28 years.

Silver was also busy recording as a sideman. In 1953, he was pianist on sessions led by Sonny Stitt, Howard McGhee, and Al Cohn, and, the following year, he played on albums by Art Farmer, Miles Davis, Milt Jackson, and others. Silver won the DownBeat critics' New Star award for piano players in 1954 and appeared at the first Newport Jazz Festival, substituting for John Lewis in the Modern Jazz Quartet. Silver's early 1950s recordings demonstrate that Bud Powell was a major pianistic influence, but this had waned by the middle of the decade.

In New York, Silver and Blakey co-founded the Jazz Messengers, a cooperatively-run group that initially recorded under various leaders and names. Their first two studio recordings, with tenor saxophonist Hank Mobley, trumpeter Kenny Dorham, and bassist Doug Watkins, were made in late 1954 and early 1955 and were released as two 10-inch albums under Silver's name, then soon thereafter as the 12-inch Horace Silver and the Jazz Messengers. This album contained Silver's first hit, "The Preacher". Unusually in Silver's career, recordings of concert performances were also released at this time, involving quintets at Birdland (1954) and the Café Bohemia (1955). This set of studio and concert recordings was pivotal in the development and defining of hard bop, which combined elements of blues, gospel, and R&B, with bebop-based harmony and rhythm. The new, funky hard bop was commercially popular and helped to establish Blue Note as a successful business.

=== 1956–69 ===
Silver's final recordings with the Jazz Messengers were in May 1956. Later that year, he left Blakey after one and a half years, in part because of the heroin use prevalent in the band, which Silver did not want to be involved in. Soon after leaving, Silver formed his own long-term quintet after receiving offers of work from club owners who had heard his albums. The first line-up was Hank Mobley (tenor saxophone), Art Farmer (trumpet), Doug Watkins (bass), and Louis Hayes (drums). The quintet, with various line-ups, continued to record, helping Silver to build his reputation. He wrote almost all of the material the band played; one of these, "Señor Blues", "officially put Horace Silver on the map", in the view of critic Scott Yanow. In concert, Silver "won over the crowds through his affable personality and all-action approach. He crouched over the piano as the sweat poured out, with his forelock brushing the keys and his feet pounding."

After more than a dozen sideman recording sessions in 1955 and a similar number in 1956–57, Silver's appearance on Sonny Rollins, Vol. 2 in April 1957 was his last for another leader, as he opted to concentrate on his own band. For several years from the late 1950s, this band contained Junior Cook (tenor saxophone), Blue Mitchell (trumpet), Gene Taylor (bass), and either Hayes or Roy Brooks (drums). Their first album was Finger Poppin', in 1959. Silver's tour of Japan early in 1962 led to the album The Tokyo Blues, recorded later that year. By the early 1960s, Silver's quintet had influenced numerous bandleaders and was among the most popular performers at jazz clubs. They also released singles, including "Blowin' the Blues Away", "Juicy Lucy", and "Sister Sadie", for jukebox and radio play. This quintet's sixth and final album was Silver's Serenade, in 1963.

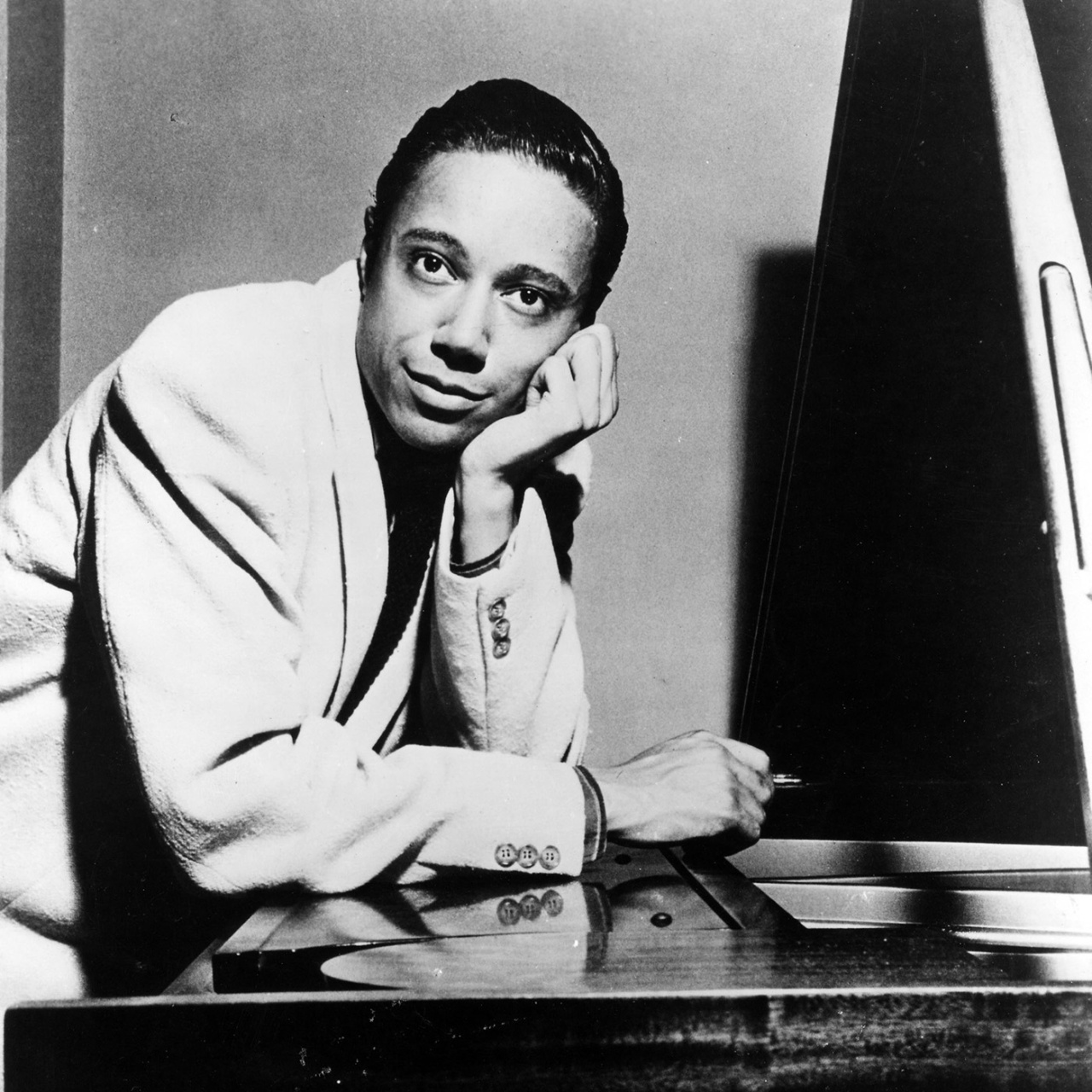
Silver c. 1965

Around this time, Silver composed music for a television commercial for the drink Tab. Early in 1964, Silver visited Brazil for three weeks, an experience he credited with increasing his interest in his heritage. In the same year, he created a new quintet, featuring Joe Henderson on tenor saxophone and Carmell Jones on trumpet. This band recorded most of Silver's best-known album, Song for My Father, which reached No. 95 on the Billboard 200 in 1965 and was added to the Grammy Hall of Fame in 1999. Recordings and personnel changes – sometimes expanding the band to a sextet – continued in the mid-1960s. In 1966, The Cape Verdean Blues charted at No. 130. The liner notes to the album Serenade to a Soul Sister (1968) included lyrics (written but not sung), indicating a new interest for Silver. His quintet, by then including saxophonist Bennie Maupin, trumpeter Randy Brecker, bassist John Williams, and drummer Billy Cobham, toured parts of Europe in October and November 1968, sponsored by the U.S. government. They also recorded one of Silver's last quintet albums for Blue Note, You Gotta Take a Little Love. The Penguin Guide to Jazz's retrospective summary of Silver's main Blue Note recordings was that they were of a consistently high standard: "each album yields one or two themes that haunt the mind, each usually has a particularly pretty ballad, and they all lay back on a deep pile of solid riffs and workmanlike solos."

=== 1970–80 ===
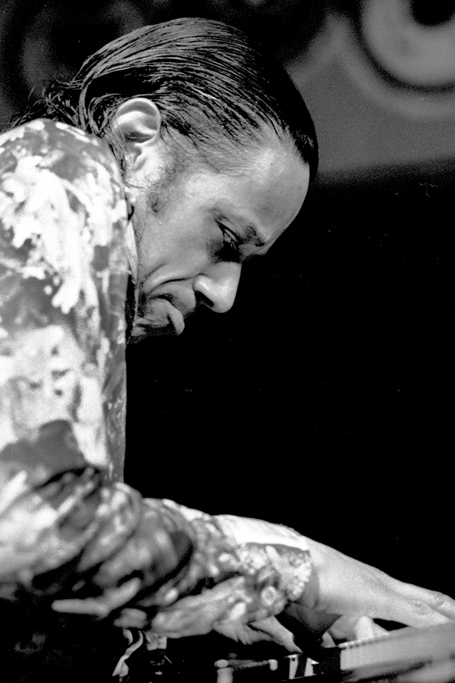
Silver at Keystone Korner, San Francisco, in 1978

At the end of 1970, Silver broke up his regular band to concentrate on composing and to spend more time with his wife. He had met Barbara Jean Dove in 1968 and married her two years later. They had a son, Gregory. Silver also became increasingly interested in spiritualism from the early 1970s.

Silver included lyrics in more of his compositions at this point, although these were sometimes regarded as doggerel or proselytizing. The first album to contain vocals, That Healin' Feelin' (1970), was commercially unsuccessful and Silver had to insist on the support of Blue Note executives to continue releasing music of the same, new style. They agreed to a further two albums that contained vocals and Silver on an RMI electric keyboard; the three were later compiled as The United States of Mind, but were soon dropped from the catalog.

Silver reformed a touring band in 1973. This contained brothers Michael and Randy Brecker. Around this time, according to saxophonist Dave Liebman, Silver's reputation among aspiring young jazz musicians was that he was "a little – not commercial, but not quite the real deal [in jazz]". Silver and his family decided to move to California around 1974 after a burglary at their New York City apartment while they were in Europe. The couple divorced in the mid-1970s.

In 1975, he recorded Silver 'n Brass, the first of five "Silver 'n" albums, which had other instruments added to the quintet. The personnel in his band continued to change and continued to contain young musicians who made telling contributions. One of these was trumpeter Tom Harrell, who stayed from 1973 to 1977. Silver's pattern in the late 1970s was to tour for six months a year. His final Blue Note album was Silver 'n Strings, recorded in 1978 and 1979. His stay was the longest in the label's history. By Silver's account, he left Blue Note after its parent company was sold and the new owners were not interested in promoting jazz. In 1980, he formed the record label Silveto, "dedicated to the spiritual, holistic, self-help elements in music", he commented. Silver also formed Emerald at the same time, a label for straight-ahead jazz; however, it was short-lived.

=== 1981–98 ===
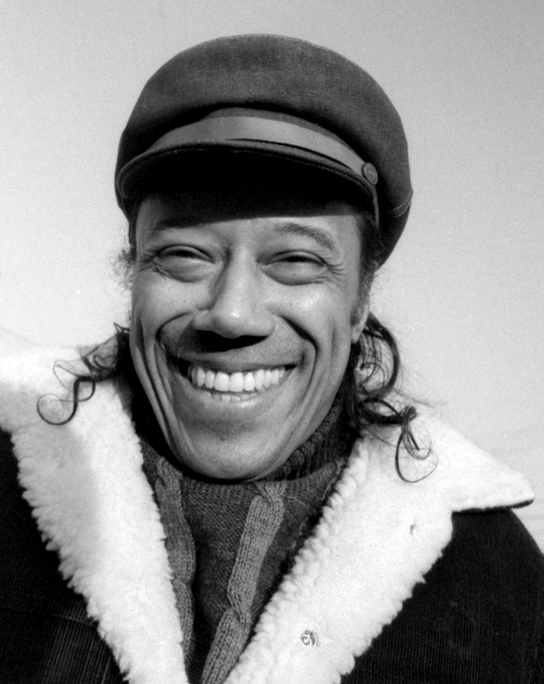
Silver in Berkeley, California, 1983

The first Silveto release was Guides to Growing Up in 1981, which contained recitations from actor and comedian Bill Cosby. Silver stated in the same year that he had reduced his touring to four months a year so that he could spend more time with his son. This also meant that he had to audition for new band members on an annual basis. He continued to write lyrics for his new albums, although these were not always included on the recordings themselves. The song titles reflected his spiritual, self-help thinking; for example, Spiritualizing the Senses from 1983 included "Seeing with Perception" and "Moving Forward with Confidence". The next albums were There's No Need to Struggle (1983) and The Continuity of Spirit (1985). His band for performances in the UK and elsewhere in 1987 included trumpeter Dave Douglas and saxophonist Vincent Herring. Douglas reported that Silver seldom gave direct verbal guidelines about the music, preferring to lead through playing. A revival of interest in more traditional forms of jazz in the 1980s largely passed Silver by, and his albums on Silveto were not critical successes. Its last release was Music to Ease Your Disease, in 1988. By the early-1990s, Silver did not often play at jazz festivals and his need to tour was limited, as he received steady royalties from his songbook.

Rockin' with Rachmaninoff, a musical work featuring dancers and narration, written by Silver and choreographed and directed by Donald McKayle, was staged in Los Angeles in 1991. A recording of the work was released on Bop City Records in 2003. After a decade of trying to make his independent label work, Silver abandoned them in 1993 and signed to Columbia Records. This also signaled a return to mostly instrumental releases. The first of these, It's Got to Be Funky, was a rare big band album. Silver came close to dying soon after its release: he was hospitalized with a previously undiagnosed blood clot problem but went on to record Pencil Packin' Papa, containing a six-piece brass section, in 1994. That year, he also played as a guest on Dee Dee Bridgewater's album Love and Peace: A Tribute to Horace Silver.

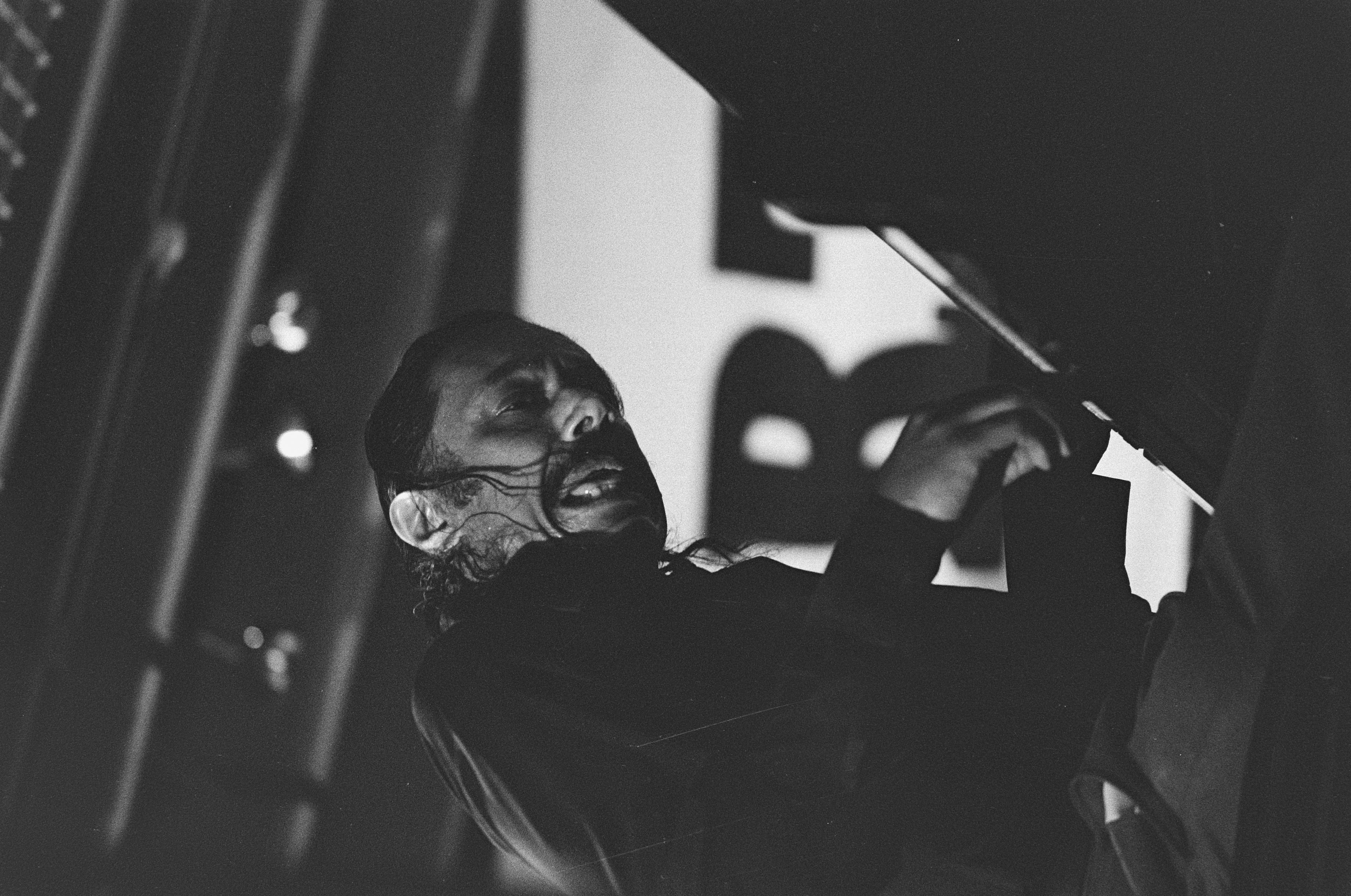
At the North Sea Jazz Festival in The Hague, 1985

Silver received a National Endowment for the Arts Jazz Masters award in 1995, and in the following year, was added to DownBeat's Jazz Hall of Fame and received an Honorary Doctorate of Music from Berklee College of Music. He switched from Columbia to Impulse! Records, where he made the septet album The Hardbop Grandpop (1996) and the quintet A Prescription for the Blues (1997). The former was nominated for two Grammy Awards: as an album for Best Instrumental Performance, Individual or Group, and for Silver's solo on "Diggin' on Dexter". He was again unwell in 1997, so was unable to tour to promote his records. His final studio recording was made in the following year – Jazz Has a Sense of Humor, for Verve Records. One continuation from his early career was that Silver recorded his own compositions for his later albums and they were typically new, rather than re-workings of previous releases.

=== 1999–2014 ===
Silver performed in public for the first time in four years in 2004, appearing with an octet at the Blue Note Jazz Club in New York. He was rarely seen in public after this. In 2005, the Recording Academy awarded him its President's Merit Award. In 2006, Let's Get to the Nitty Gritty: The Autobiography of Horace Silver, was published by the University of California Press. A 2008 release, Live at Newport '58, from a Silver concert fifty years earlier, reached the top ten of Billboard's jazz chart.

In 2007, it was revealed that Silver had Alzheimer's disease. He died of natural causes in New Rochelle, New York, on June 18, 2014, aged 85. He was survived by his son.

== Playing style ==
Silver's early recordings displayed "a crisp, chipper but slightly wayward style, idiosyncratic enough to take him out of the increasingly stratified realms of bebop". In contrast to the more elaborate bebop piano, he stressed straightforward melodies rather than complex harmonies and included short riffs and motifs that came and went over the course of a solo. While his right hand provided cleanly played lines, his left added bouncy, darker notes and chords in a near-perpetual rumble. Silver "always played percussively, rarely suggesting excessive force on the keys but mustering a crisp [...] sound." His fingering was idiosyncratic, but this added to the individuality of his pianism, particularly to the authenticity of the blues facets of his playing. The Penguin Guide to Jazz gave the overall assessment that "Blues and gospel-tinged devices and percussive attacks give his methods a more colourful style, and a generous good humour gives all his records an upbeat feel." Part of the humor was Silver's predilection for quoting other pieces of music in his own playing.

Writer and academic Thomas Owens stated that characteristics of Silver's solos were "the short, simple phrases that all derive from the three-beat figure | , or a variant of it; the pianist's 'blue fifth' (those rapid slurs up to [... a flattened fifth]); and the low tone cluster used strictly as a rhythmic punctuation". He also employed blues and minor pentatonic scales. Music journalist Marc Myers observed that "Silver's advantage was pianistic grace and a keen awareness that by resolving dark, minor-passages in airy, ascending and descending major-key chord configurations, the result could produce an exciting and uplifting feeling." In his accompanying of a soloing saxophonist or trumpeter, Silver was also distinctive: "Rather than reacting to the soloist's melody and waiting for melodic holes to fill, he typically plays background patterns similar to the background riffs that saxes or brasses play behind soloists in big bands."

== Compositions ==
Early in his career, Silver composed contrafacts and blues-based melodies, including "Doodlin'" and "Opus de Funk". The latter was "a typical Silver creation: advanced in its harmonic structure and general approach but with a catchy tune and finger-snapping beat." His innovative incorporation of gospel and blues sounds into jazz compositions took place while they were also being added to rock 'n' roll and R&B pieces.

Silver soon expanded the range and style of his writing, which grew to include "funky groove tunes, gentle mood pieces, vamp songs, outings in 3/4 and 6/8 time, Latin workouts of various stripes, up-tempo jam numbers, and examples of almost any and every other kind of approach congruent with the hard bop aesthetic." An unusual case is "Peace", a ballad that prioritizes a calm mood over melodic or harmonic effects. Owens observed that "Many of his compositions contain no folk blues or gospel music elements, but instead have highly chromatic melodies supported by richly dissonant harmonies". The compositions and arrangements were also designed to make Silver's typical line-up sound larger than a quintet.

Silver himself commented that inspiration came from multiple sources: "I'm inspired by nature and by some of the people I meet and some of the events that take place in my life. I'm inspired by my mentors. I'm inspired by various religious doctrines. [...] Many of my songs are impressed on my mind just before I wake up. Others I get from just doodlin' around on the piano". He also wrote that, "when I wake up with a melody in my head, I jump right out of bed before I forget it and run to the piano and my tape recorder. I play the melody with my right hand and then harmonize it with my left. I put it down on my tape recorder, and then I work on getting a bridge or eight-bar release for the tune."

== Influence and legacy ==
Silver was among the most influential jazz musicians of his lifetime. Grove Music Online describes his legacy as at least fourfold: as a pioneer of hard bop; as a user of what became the archetypal quintet instrumentation of tenor saxophone, trumpet, piano, bass, and drums; as a developer of young musicians who went on to become important players and bandleaders; and for his skill as a composer and arranger.

Silver was also an influence as a pianist: his first Blue Note recording as leader "redefined the jazz piano, which up until then was largely modeled on the dexterity and relentless attack of Bud Powell", in Myers's words. As early as 1956, Silver's piano playing was described by DownBeat as "a key influence on a large segment of modern jazz pianists." This went on to include Ramsey Lewis, Les McCann, Bobby Timmons, and Cecil Taylor, who was impressed by Silver's aggressive style.

Silver's legacy as a composer may be greater than as a pianist, because his works, many of which are jazz standards, continue to be performed and recorded worldwide. As a composer, he led a return to an emphasis on melody, observed critic John S. Wilson: for a long time, jazz musicians had written contrafacts of great technical complexity, but "Silver wrote originals that were not only actually original but memorably melodic, presaging a gradual return to melodic creativity among writing jazzmen."
