= Woody Shaw: The Complete Columbia Albums Collection =

The Complete Columbia Album Collection

Box set by Woody Shaw
- Released: September 13, 2011
- Genre: Jazz
- Length: 5:07:16
- Label: Columbia/Legacy
- Producers: Michael Cuscuna, Woody Shaw III

Woody Shaw chronology
Woody Shaw Live, Vol 4. (2005)	The Complete Columbia Album Collection (2011)	Woody Plays Woody (2012)

Professional ratings
Review scores
Source	Rating
AllMusic	5/5 stars

Woody Shaw: The Complete Columbia Albums Collection is a 6-CD box set compilation of recordings by jazz trumpeter, composer and bandleader Woody Shaw, released in 2011.

The box set includes Shaw's original five Columbia albums plus a CD of previously unreleased recordings taken from the original master tapes of Shaw's Stepping Stones: Live at the Village Vanguard session.

== CD and Track Listing ==
Disc 1: Rosewood
No.	Title	Composer	Length
1.	"Rosewood"	Woody Shaw	7:14
2.	"Every Time I see You"	Onaje Allan Gumbs	7:16
3.	"The Legend of Cheops"	Victor Lewis	6:06
4.	"Rahsaan's Run"	Woody Shaw	5:12
5.	"Sun Showers"	Clint Houston	7:50
6.	"Theme For Maxine"	Woody Shaw	7:15

Disc 2: Stepping Stones: Live at the Village Vanguard
No.	Title	Composer	Length
1.	"Stepping Stone"	Woody Shaw	9:12
2.	"In A Capricornian Way"	Woody Shaw	11:16
3.	"Seventh Avenue"	Victor Lewis	8:35
4.	"All Things Being Equal Are Not"	Onaje Allan Gumbs	12:04
5.	"Escape Velocity"	Clint Houston	11:14
6.	"Blue For Ball"	McCoy Tyner	17:12
7.	"Theme for Maxine"	Woody Shaw	1:00

Disc 3: Stepping Stones Bonus Tracks
No.	Title	Composer	Length
1.	"It All Comes Back to You"	Onaje Allan Gumbs	10:15
2.	"Watership Down"	Clint Houston	13:49
3.	"Solar"	Miles Davis	16:21
4.	"On Green Dolphin Street"	Bronislaw Kaper, Ned Washington	16:02
5.	"Days of Wine and Roses"	Henry Mancini, Johnny Mercer	13:38

Disc 4: Woody III
No.	Title	Composer	Length
1.	"Woody I: On the New Ark"	Woody Shaw	7:20
2.	"Woody II: Other Paths"	Woody Shaw	6:54
3.	"Woody III: New Offerings"	Woody Shaw	8:31
4.	"To Kill A Brick"	Woody Shaw	7:43
5.	"Organ Grinder"	Woody Shaw	5:31

Disc 5: For Sure!
No.	Title	Composer	Length
1.	"We'll Be Together Again" (arr. by Marty Sheller)	Carl T. Fischer	7:20
2.	"OPEC"	Woody Shaw	5:22
3.	"Time is Right"	Judi Singh	4:28
4.	"Ginseng People"	Woody Shaw	5:31
5.	"Why?"	Victor Lewis	4:53
6.	"Joshua C."	Woody Shaw	7:13
7.	"Isabel the Liberator"	Larry Willis	8:29
8.	"Teotihuacan"	Stafford James	7:19

Disc 6: United
No.	Title	Composer	Length
1.	"United"	Wayne Shorter	5:23
2.	"The Greene Street Caper"	Woody Shaw	5:30
3.	"What Is This Thing Called Love?"	Cole Porter	9:42
4.	"Pressing the Issue"	Mulgrew Miller	7:05
5.	"Katrina Ballerina"	Woody Shaw	5:42
6.	"Blues for Wood"	Ronnie Mathews	7:17
