= Woody Shaw: The Complete Muse Sessions =

The Complete Muse Sessions

Box set by Woody Shaw
- Released: 2013
- Genre: Jazz
- Length: 6:33:37
- Label: Mosaic Records
- Producers: Michael Cuscuna, Woody Shaw III

Woody Shaw chronology
Woody Plays Woody (2012)	The Complete Muse Sessions (2013)

Professional ratings
Review scores
Source	Rating
Allmusic	5/5 stars

Woody Shaw: The Complete Muse Sessions is a 7-CD box set compilation of recordings by jazz trumpeter, composer and bandleader Woody Shaw, released in 2013 by Mosaic Records.

The box set includes all nine of Woody Shaw's albums for Muse Records that were originally released during the periods between 1974–1977 and 1983–1987. The collection features an accompanying booklet written by Shaw's son, Woody Louis Armstrong Shaw III, who co-produced the set. Includes new photographs and remastered sound by Malcolm Addey.

== Reception ==
Matt Collar of AllMusic stated that the Muse albums "represent not only some of the most important recordings of Shaw's career, but some of the most influential and individualistic artistic statements by a jazz artist in the 20th century."

== CD and Track Listing ==
Disc 1 : The Moontrane
No.	Title	Writer(s)	Length
1.	"The Moontrane"	Woody Shaw	6:54
2.	"Are They Only Dreams"	Onaje Allan Gumbs	9:12
3.	"Tapscott’s Blues"	Azar Lawrence	6:41
4.	"Sanyas"	Steve Turre	13:05
5.	"Katrina Ballerina"	Woody Shaw	7:36
6.	"Tapscott’s Blues (alt tk)"	Azar Lawrence	6:50
7.	"Katrina Ballerina (alt tk)"	Woody Shaw	8:01

Disc 2 : Love Dance
No.	Title	Writer(s)	Length
1.	"Love Dance"	Joe Bonner	12:36
2.	"Obsequious"	Larry Young	9:28
3.	"Sun Bath"	Peggy Stern	6:33
4.	"Zoltan"	Woody Shaw	6:45
5.	"Soulfully I Love You (Black Spiritual Of Love)"	Billy Harper	8:13

Disc 3 : The Woody Shaw Concert Ensemble at the Berliner Jazztage
No.	Title	Writer(s)	Length
1.	"Hello To The Wind"	Joe Chambers	16:36
2.	"Obsequious"	Larry Young	9:29
3.	"Sanyas"	Steve Turre	9:55
4.	"Jean Marie"	Ronnie Mathews	9:34
5.	"Bilad As Sudan (Land Of The Blacks)"	Rene McLean	12:34

Disc 4: Tracks 1–5 from In the Beginning / Cassandranite and Tracks 6–7 from Little Red's Fantasy
No.	Title	Writer(s)	Length
1.	"Cassandranite"	Woody Shaw	6:47
2.	"Obsequious"	Larry Young	7:39
3.	"Baloo, Baloo"	Hank Johnson	6:00
4.	"Three Muses"	Woody Shaw	6:22
5.	"Tetragon"	Joe Henderson	6:37
6.	"Jean Marie"	Ronnie Mathews	7:39
7.	"Sashianova"	Stafford James	9:58

Disc 5 : Tracks 1–3 from Little Red's Fantasy and Tracks 4–9 from The Iron Men
No.	Title	Writer(s)	Length
1.	"In Case You Haven’t Heard"	Woody Shaw	6:25
2.	"Little Red’s Fantasy"	Woody Shaw	7:05
3.	"Tomorrow’s Destiny"	Woody Shaw	7:45
4.	"Iron Man"	Eric Dolphy	6:20
5.	"Jitterbug Waltz"	Fats Waller	8:26
6.	"Symmetry"	Andrew Hill	8:17
7.	"Diversion One"	Woody Shaw	2:55
8.	"Song Of Songs"	Woody Shaw	12:45
9.	"Diversion Two"	Woody Shaw	2:52

Disc 6 : Tracks 1–6 from Setting Standards and Tracks 7–10 from Solid
No.	Title	Writer(s)	Length
1.	"There Is No Greater Love"	Isham Jones	6:58
2.	"All The Way"	Sammy Cahn and Jimmy Van Heusen	7:50
3.	"Spiderman Blues"	Woody Shaw	4:45
4.	"The Touch of Your Lips"	Ray Noble	6:44
5.	"What's New?"	Bob Haggart and Johnny Burke	7:43
6.	"When Love Is New"	Cedar Walton	4:30
7.	"There Will Never Be Another You"	Mack Gordon and Harry Warren	6:55
8.	"You Stepped Out Of A Dream"	Nacio Brown and Gus Kahn	5:29
9.	"Speak Low"	Kurt Weill and Ogden Nash	8:55
10.	"Solid"	Sonny Rollins	4:38

Disc 7 : Tracks 1–2 from Solid and Tracks 3–8 from Imagination
No.	Title	Writer(s)	Length
1.	"It Might As Well Be Spring"	Richard Rodgers and Oscar Hammerstein	10:00
2.	"The Woody Woodpecker Song"	Ramey Idriss and George Tibbles	3:42
3.	"If I Were A Bell"	Frank Loesser	5:21
4.	"Imagination"	Johnny Burke and Jimmy Van Heusen	7:24
5.	"Dat Dere"	Bobby Timmons	8:08
6.	"You And The Night And The Music"	Howard Dietz and Arthur Schwartz	5:59
7.	"Stormy Weather"	Harold Arlen and Ted Koehler	7:55
8.	"Steve’s Blues"	Steve Turre	4:46
