= Timeless Muse =

Jazz record label

Timeless Muse was a jazz record label, a partnership between the Dutch label Timeless Records and the American label Muse Records. Most albums are c. 1979.

== Discography ==
- TI 301: Art Blakey – In My Prime Vol. 1
- TI 302: Joanne Brackeen – AFT
- TI 303: Lionel Hampton – Live in Emmen/Holland
- TI 304: Tete Montoliu – Catalonian Folksongs
- TI 305: Rein De Graaff – Dick Vennik Quartet – Modal Soul
- TI 306: Cedar Walton, Billy Higgins, George Coleman, Sam Jones – Eastern Rebellion
- TI 307: Louis Hayes, Junior Mance featuring Woody Shaw (with Ronnie Mathews, Stafford James, Guilherme Franco) – Ichi–Ban
- TI 308: Rick Laird – Soft Focus
- TI 309: Carter Jefferson – The Rise of Atlantis
- TI 310: Free Fair – Free Fair
- TI 311: Johnny Griffin / Art Taylor Quartet – The JAMFs are Coming!
- TI 312: George Coleman / Tete Montoliu – Duo
- TI 313: Mike Nock – In Out & Around
- TI 314: Marion Brown – La Placita – Live in Willisau
- TI 315: Eddie Marshall – Dance of the Sun
- TI 317: Art Blakey & The Jazz Messengers – Reflections in Blue
- TI 318: Cedar Walton, Billy Higgins, Bob Berg, Sam Jones – Eastern Rebellion 2
- TI 321: Rein De Graaff Quintet – New York Jazz
- TI 322: George Adams – Paradise Space Shuttle
- TI 323: Rodney Jones– Articulation
