= Tyrone Washington (musician) =

American saxophonist (born 1944)

- Born: 1944 (age 81–82)
- Genres: Jazz
- Instrument: Tenor saxophone
- Years active: 1967–1974
- Labels: Blue Note, Perception

Tyrone Washington (born 1944) is an American jazz tenor saxophonist.

== Biography ==
=== Early life ===
Washington was born to Robert Benjamin Washington and Eunice Washington, a head teacher and supervisor at a neighborhood center in Newark, New Jersey. He was one of three children. From his early years, Washington was a close friend of trumpet player Woody Shaw. He briefly attended Howard University School of Music before joining Horace Silver's hard bop sextet.

=== Career ===
Prior to recording albums as leader, Washington recorded on Silver's album The Jody Grind and recorded a soul jazz album with organist Larry Young. His first album as leader, for which he is best known, was Natural Essence, recorded for Blue Note in 1967. Natural Essence was followed by two more albums, Roots and Do Right. Roots featured a range of influences including soul jazz and free jazz, and included Hubert Eaves on piano. His final album as leader, Do Right, included Eaves along with guitarist Billy Nichols, alto saxophone player and son of Jackie McLean René McLean, and drummer Idris Muhammad, with funk influences. The album, first issued on the label Blue Labor, was later remastered and released on CD for the label P-Vine. Jason Ankeny, writing for AllMusic, Do Right as "fascinating listening, exploring both the extreme and the mainstream." Hrayr Attarian, writing for All About Jazz, described the musicians as "extremely talented" and "masters of their respective instruments," but considered the funky style of the album "dated."

Washington did not record after 1974, leaving his music career for religious reasons. According to an obituary for his mother, he was still alive in 2022. He had changed his name to Mohammad Bilal Abdullah and had become a Sunni Muslim minister.

== Discography ==
=== As leader ===
- 1967: Natural Essence with Woody Shaw, James Spaulding, Kenny Barron, Reggie Workman, Joe Chambers (Blue Note)
- 1968: Unreleased Session with Herbie Hancock, Herbie Lewis, Jack DeJohnette (Blue Note)
- 1973: Roots with Stafford James, Clifford Barbaro Barconadhi, Hubert Eaves III (Perception)
- 1974: Do Right with Hubert Eaves III, Billy Nichols, René McLean, Idris Muhammad) (Blue Labor)

=== As sideman ===
With Stanley Cowell

- Brilliant Circles (Freedom, 1969)

With Roswell Rudd

- Blown Bone (Philips, 1976)

With Horace Silver

- The Jody Grind (Blue Note, 1966)

With Heiner Stadler

- Brains on Fire (Labor, 1973)

With Larry Young

- Contrasts (Blue Note, 1967)
