= Woody Plays Woody =

Compilation album by Woody Shaw
- Released: 2012
- Recorded: 1977–81
- Venue: Keystone Korner, San Francisco, CA
- Genre: Jazz
- Length: 67:05
- Label: High Note
- Producer: Woody Shaw III

Woody Shaw chronology
| Woody Shaw: The Complete Columbia Albums Collection (2011) | Woody Plays Woody (2012) | Woody Shaw: The Complete Muse Sessions (2013) |

Woody Plays Woody (2012) is a compilation of live performances by trumpeter-composer Woody Shaw taken from the Woody Shaw Live Vol. 1-4 series originally released by HighNote Records between 2000 and 2005. Four of the six tracks are dedicated to influences and fellow musicians and it is the first and only CD to ever include Woody Shaw's original compositions exclusively.

Woody Plays Woody was produced by Shaw's son and musical heir, Woody Shaw III, who details the background and history of the music in his extended liner notes.

== Reception ==
Jeff Krow of Audiophile Audition said of the CD: "What stands out in listening to this CD approximately 35 years after these songs were recorded is the vibrancy of Shaw’s imagination, and his intensity in playing his horn."

== Track listing ==
All compositions by Woody Shaw

1. "Little Red's Fantasy" - 10:44 Originally released on Live Volume Three
2. "Rahsaan's Run" - 11:50 Originally released on Live Volume Two
3. "Stepping Stone" - 11:03 Originally released on Live Volume One
4. "Organ Grinder" - 10:04 Originally released on Live Volume Three
5. "OPEC" - 11:44 Originally released on Live Volume Four
6. "Ginseng People" - 11:40 Originally released on Live Volume Three

== Personnel ==
- Woody Shaw - trumpet, flugelhorn
- Carter Jefferson - tenor saxophone, soprano saxophone
- Steve Turre - trombone, bass trombone
- Mulgrew Miller - piano
- Larry Willis - piano
- Stafford James - bass
- Victor Lewis - drums
