= The Time Is Right (Woody Shaw album) =

Live album by Woody Shaw
- Released: 1983
- Recorded: January 1, 1983
- Venue: Osteria Delle Dame, Bologna
- Genre: Jazz
- Length: 46:59
- Label: Red; VPA 1682
- Producer: Alberto Alberti

Woody Shaw chronology
Night Music (1982)	The Time Is Right (1983)	Setting Standards (1983)

The Time Is Right is a live album led by trumpter Woody Shaw which was recorded in Italy in 1983 and released on the Red label.

== Reception ==
Professional ratings
Review scores
Source	Rating
Allmusic	4/5 stars

Scott Yanow of Allmusic stated, "Although the quintet featured on this CD reissue from the Italian Red label was one of trumpeter Woody Shaw's finest, it failed to make much of an impact before breaking up... High-quality advanced hard bop".

== Track listing ==
1. "(From) Moment to Moment" (Henry Mancini) - 12:16
2. "Time Is Right" (Judi Singh) - 12:05
3. "You and the Night and the Music" (Howard Dietz, Arthur Schwartz) - 12:17
4. "We'll Be Together Again" (Carl T. Fischer, Frankie Laine) - 10:21

== Personnel ==
- Woody Shaw - trumpet, flugelhorn
- Steve Turre - trombone
- Mulgrew Miller - piano
- Stafford James - bass
- Tony Reedus - drums
