= In the Beginning (Woody Shaw album) =

Studio album by Woody Shaw
- Released: 1983
- Recorded: December 1965
- Studio: Van Gelder Studio, Englewood Cliffs, New Jersey
- Genre: Jazz
- Length: 32:57
- Label: Muse; MR 5298

Woody Shaw chronology
In the Beginning (1983)	Blackstone Legacy (1970)

In the Beginning (also released as Cassandranite) is an album featuring the demo tapes recorded in 1965 by trumpeter Woody Shaw in his original quest for a recording contract of Blue Note Records which was eventually released on the Muse label in 1983. Cassandranite was released as part of Woody Shaw: The Complete Muse Sessions by Mosaic Records in 2013.

== Reception ==
Professional ratings
Review scores
Source	Rating
Allmusic	4/5 stars

Ron Wynn of Allmusic stated, "Some interesting, uneven, but worthwhile '65 material from trumpeter Woody Shaw... His potential certainly emerges, as does the fact he was a tentative, unsure soloist at this juncture".

== Track listing ==
All compositions by Woody Shaw except as indicated

1. "Cassandranite" - 7:00
2. "Obsequious" (Larry Young) - 8:00
3. "Baloo Baloo" (Hank Johnson) - 6:00
4. "Three Muses" - 6:22
5. "Tetragon" (Joe Henderson) - 6:35

== Personnel ==
- Woody Shaw - trumpet
- Joe Henderson - tenor saxophone
- Herbie Hancock (tracks 3–5), Larry Young (tracks 1 & 2) - piano
- Paul Chambers (tracks 3–5), Ron Carter (tracks 1 & 2) - bass
- Joe Chambers - drums
