= The Time Is Right =

The Time Is Right may refer to:

- The Time Is Right (Lou Donaldson album)
- The Time Is Right (Woody Shaw album)
