= Roger Humphries =

American jazz drummer (born 1944)

Roger Humphries, Sr.
- Born: January 30, 1944 (age 81); Pittsburgh, Pennsylvania, U.S.
- Genres: Jazz
- Occupation: Musician
- Instrument: Drums
- Website: http://www.rogerhumphriesband.com/

Roger Humphries (born January 30, 1944) is an American jazz drummer.

Born into a family of ten children in Pittsburgh, Pennsylvania, Humphries began playing drums at age four, and went professional at age 14. He led an ensemble at Carnegie Hall at age 16. Early in the 1960s, he began touring with jazz musicians; one of his more prominent gigs was in a trio with Stanley Turrentine and Shirley Scott in 1962. In 1964, he worked with Horace Silver, appearing on the album Song for My Father, where he played on four tracks, including the title tune (on which album Roy Brooks played on two tracks from a session recorded a year earlier) and in 1965, Humphries performed on the Horace Silver album The Cape Verdean Blues with Silver, tenor saxophonist Joe Henderson, trumpeter Woody Shaw, trombonist J.J. Johnson and bassist Bob Cranshaw. Following this Humphries drummed for Ray Charles.

Humphries's list of credits in jazz, R&B, and pop is extensive. Musicians he has played with, in addition to the above, include Lee Morgan, Grant Green, Billy Taylor, Bill Doggett, Benny Green, Lionel Hampton, Coleman Hawkins, Barry Harris, Clark Terry, J. J. Johnson, Billy Preston, Joe Henderson, Freddie Hubbard, Dizzy Gillespie, Jack McDuff, Gene Harris, George Harris, George Benson, Jon Faddis, Slide Hampton, Johnny Griffin, Herbie Mann, Randy Brecker, Joe Williams, Milt Jackson, Jimmy Witherspoon, Hubert Laws, Dwayne Dolphin, Isley Brothers, and Illinois Jacquet.

Humphries led his own band in the early 1970s, R.H. Factor, and led ensembles under other names into the 1990s. He has also held teaching positions at the University of Pittsburgh and the Pittsburgh High School for the Creative and Performing Arts. He released albums under his own name in 1993, 2003, and 2011.

For the majority of his career, Humphries played Gretsch Drums -- which contributed to the forceful sound of his work with Horace Silver. Later, he switched to Yamaha kits, especially when leading his own bands.

== Discography ==
- Horace Silver Song for My Father (Blue Note, 1964)
- Carmell Jones Jay Hawk Talk (Prestige, 1965)
- Horace Silver The Cape Verdean Blues (Blue Note, 1965)
- Horace Silver The Jody Grind (Blue Note, 1966)
- Frank Cunimondo Trio Introducing Lynn Marino (Mondo, 1969)
- Nathan Davis Makatuka (Segue, 1971)
- Horace Silver Live 1964 (Emerald, 1984)
- Roger Humphries and the RH Factor "This 'n' That" (Corona 1992)
- Dwayne Dolphin Portrait of Adrian (Minor Music, 1993)
- Jimmy Ponder Something to Ponder (Muse, 1994)
- Steve Rudolph Everything I Love (R&L Jazz, 1995)
- Al Dowe & Etta Cox Sunday Jam (1996)
- Nancy Wilson A Nancy Wilson Christmas (MCG Jazz 2001)
- Roger Humphries Big Band Don't Give Up (2003)
- Bill Heid Air Mobile (Doodlin', 2006)
- Roger Humphries and the RH Factor "Keep the Faith" (Corona 2011)
- Horace Silver featuring Woody Shaw "Live at The Half-Note" (2015)
