= Love Dance =

Studio album by Woody Shaw
- Released: 1976
- Recorded: November 1975; Blue Rock Studios, New York City
- Genre: Jazz
- Length: 58:19
- Label: Muse; MR 5074
- Producer: Michael Cuscuna

Woody Shaw chronology
The Moontrane (1974)	Love Dance (1976)	Little Red's Fantasy (1976)

Love Dance is the fourth album led by trumpeter Woody Shaw which was recorded in 1975 and released on the Muse label. Love Dance was reissued by Mosaic Records as part of Woody Shaw: The Complete Muse Sessions in 2013.

== Reception ==
Professional ratings
Review scores
Source	Rating
Allmusic	4.5/5 stars
The Rolling Stone Jazz Record Guide	3/5 stars

The Allmusic site awarded this album 4 stars.

== Track listing ==
All compositions by Woody Shaw except as indicated

1. "Love Dance" (Joe Bonner) - 12:37
2. "Obsequious" (Larry Young) - 9:28
3. "Sunbath" (Peggy Stern) - 6:33
4. "Zoltan" - 6:48
5. "Soulfully I Love You (Black Spiritual of Love)" (Billy Harper) - 8:13

== Personnel ==
- Woody Shaw - trumpet
- Steve Turre - trombone, bass trombone
- René McLean - alto saxophone, soprano saxophone
- Billy Harper - tenor saxophone
- Joe Bonner - piano, electric piano
- Cecil McBee - bass
- Victor Lewis - drums
- Guilherme Franco - percussion
- Tony Waters - congas
