= Setting Standards =

Studio album by Woody Shaw
- Released: 1984
- Recorded: December 1, 1983; Van Gelder Studio, Englewood Cliffs, New Jersey
- Genre: Jazz
- Length: 38:56
- Label: Muse; MR 5318
- Producer: Michael Cuscuna

Woody Shaw chronology
The Time Is Right (1983)	Setting Standards (1984)	Woody Shaw with the Tone Jansa Quartet (1985)

Setting Standards is an album led by trumpeter Woody Shaw which was recorded in 1983 and released on the Muse label. Setting Standards was released as part of Woody Shaw: The Complete Muse Sessions by Mosaic Records in 2013.

== Reception ==
Professional ratings
Review scores
Source	Rating
Allmusic	4/5 stars

Scott Yanow of Allmusic stated, "This Muse release finds the brilliant trumpeter Woody Shaw in fine form... The music is reasonably accessible and swinging yet imaginative in a subtle way. Recommended".

== Track listing ==
All compositions by Woody Shaw except as indicated

1. "There Is No Greater Love" (Isham Jones, Marty Symes) - 7:02
2. "All the Way" (Sammy Cahn, Jimmy Van Heusen) - 7:53
3. "Spiderman Blues" - 4:51
4. "The Touch of Your Lips" (Ray Noble) - 6:47
5. "What's New?" (Johnny Burke, Bob Haggart) - 7:48
6. "When Love Is New" (Cedar Walton) - 4:35

== Personnel ==
- Woody Shaw - trumpet, flugelhorn
- Cedar Walton - piano
- Buster Williams - bass
- Victor Jones - drums
