= Dr. Chi =

Studio album by Tone Janša Quartet featuring Woody Shaw
- Released: 1989
- Recorded: July 1986; Radio Ljubljana Musical Center 26, Slovenia
- Genre: Jazz
- Length: 57:04
- Label: Timeless; SJP 241

Woody Shaw chronology
Solid (1986)	Dr. Chi (1989)	In My Own Sweet Way (1987)

Dr. Chi is an album by trumpeter Woody Shaw and the Tone Janša Quartet which was recorded in Slovenia in 1986 and released on the Timeless label.

== Reception ==
Professional ratings
Review scores
Source	Rating
Allmusic	4.5/5 stars

Steve Loewy of Allmusic stated, "this delightful collaboration between American trumpeter Woody Shaw and the Tone Janša Quartet works on nearly every level... Janša's fluid, driving lines fit beautifully with Shaw's concepts. Even more importantly, Shaw is in great form, and there is an electricity in the air that infuses each track... A strong addition to Shaw's and Janša's discographies, and a good introduction to the saxophonist's work".

== Track listing ==
All compositions by Tone Janša except as indicated

1. "Dr. Chi" (Woody Shaw) - 15:19
2. "Odra" - 8:04
3. "Stroll and Flight" - 12:33
4. "Nostalgia" - 3:48
5. "Chain" - 8:48
6. "Zoltan" (Shaw) - 8:32

== Personnel ==
- Woody Shaw - trumpet, flugelhorn
- Tone Janša - tenor saxophone, soprano saxophone
- Renato Chicco - piano
- Peter Herbert - bass
- Alexander Deutsch - drums
