= Tone Janša =

Slovenian jazz musician and music teacher

- Born: 1943; Ormož, Slovenia
- Occupation(s): saxophone, flute
- Style: Jazz

Anton "Tone" Janša (May 5, 1943 in Ormož) is a Slovenian jazz musician (saxophone, flute, composition) and music teacher.

== Carriere ==
Janša graduated from the University of Music and Performing Arts in Graz with the master's degree of classical and jazz saxophone. After continuing his study at Berklee College of Music in the United States, he came back to Yugoslavia during hs education, he formed his own quartet in 1972 along with André Jeanquartier, Ewald Oberleitner and John Preininger. In 1974, he became a member of RTV Ljubliana Big Band. he was active in the band until 1984 and was involved in its various productions. With his band, he made several tours through Europe as well as to India and Soviet Union. Since 1988, he has worked as a docent at the University of Music and Performing Arts. Also, he collaborated with Aladár Pege, Gustav Brom, Mladi Levi and the Swing & Musical Orchester Graz.

== Discography ==
- Tone Janša Jazz Kvartet (1977; with Ewald Oberleitner, John Preininger, Harald Neuwirth, André Jeanquartier
- Beogradski Jazz Festival '78 (1978; with Ewald Oberleitner, Johann Preininger, Miroslav Karlović, André Jeanquartier)
- Pattern (1979; with Ewald Oberleitner, Miroslav Karlović, André Jeanquartier
- Goa (1983; mit Dejan Pečenko, Andy Lumpp, Bernd Dietrich, Slavko Avsenik Jr., Gerhard Wennemuth, Adelhard Roidinger, Karel Novak, Ratko Divjak)
- Woody Shaw with the Tone Jansa Quartet (1985)
- Dr. Chi (1986)
- Plays Original Music (1998; with Lado Rebrek; Primož Grašič, Aleš Rendla, Dejan Pečenko, Dominik Krajnčan)
- Long Way (2016; with Renato Chicco, Philipp Zarfl, Drago Gajo)
