= Onaje =

Studio album by Onaje Allan Gumbs
- Released: 1977
- Recorded: August 10, 1976
- Genre: Jazz
- Length: 44:01
- Label: SteepleChase; SCS 1069
- Producer: Nils Winther

Onaje Allan Gumbs chronology
Onaje (1977)	That Special Part of Me (1988)

Onaje is the debut album by American pianist Onaje Allan Gumbs, released on the Danish-based SteepleChase label in 1977.

== Critical reception ==
Professional ratings
Review scores
Source	Rating
AllMusic	4/5 stars
The Penguin Guide to Jazz Recordings	3/4 stars

The Allmusic review by Ken Dryden states, "Gumbs displays surprisingly maturity for a composer only in his mid-20s at the time of the recording, performing a series of thought-provoking originals ... When Gumbs is playing works by others, he does not take the predictable path ... In the decades which have followed this debut, Onaje Allan Gumbs may not have earned the accolades which he has merited, but this CD is well-worth acquiring".

== Track listing ==
All compositions by Onaje Allan Gumbs unless noted.

1. "Waiting... in Love" – 4:29
2. "Street Life" – 9:53
3. "Timeless" – 3:18
4. "It Sho' Do Feel Good, Did Ya Here Me?" – 4:30
5. "Giant Steps" (John Coltrane) – 3:06
6. "Eye of a Shadow" – 6:44
7. "Mousetrap" – 2:50
8. "Con Alma" (Dizzy Gillespie) – 5:24
9. "A Penny for Your Thoughts" – 3:42

== Personnel ==
- Onaje Allan Gumbs – piano
