= Stepping Stones: Live at the Village Vanguard =

Live album by Woody Shaw
- Released: 1979, 2005
- Recorded: August 5 & 6, 1978; Village Vanguard, New York City
- Genre: Jazz
- Length: 70:33
- Label: Columbia; JC 35560
- Producer: Michael Cuscuna, Woody Shaw III

Woody Shaw chronology
Rosewood (1977)	Stepping Stones: Live at the Village Vanguard (1979)	Woody III (1979)

Stepping Stones: Live at the Village Vanguard is a live album led by trumpeter Woody Shaw which was recorded at the Village Vanguard in 1978 and released on the Columbia label in 1979.

Stepping Stones: Live at the Village Vanguard was reissued by Legacy Recordings in 2005. The re-release was produced by Shaw's producer Michael Cuscuna and Shaw's son Woody Louis Armstrong Shaw III, both of whom contributed new liner notes along with Shaw's long-time trombonist Steve Turre. The reissue was remastered by engineer Mark Wilder.

== Reception ==
Professional ratings
Review scores
Source	Rating
Allmusic	4.5/5 stars

Scott Yanow of Allmusic stated "the band sounds technically and creatively inspired... Shaw pushed those innovations as far as they could go. Few have come close to approaching his artistry and cerebral architecture and none have gone past it. Stepping Stones: Live at the Village Vanguard captures that artistry in motion".

== Track listing ==
All compositions by Woody Shaw except as indicated

1. "Stepping Stone" - 9:12
2. "In a Capricornian Way" - 11:16
3. "Seventh Avenue" (Victor Lewis) - 8:35
4. "All Things Being Equal Are Not" (Onaje Allan Gumbs) - 12:04 *
5. "Escape Velocity" (Clint Houston) - 11:14 **
6. "Blues for Ball" (McCoy Tyner) - 17:12 *
7. "Theme for Maxine" - 1:00
- Released on the 2005 reissue by Sony Legacy and in 2011 on Woody Shaw: The Complete Columbia Albums Collection .
  - Originally released on Shaw's 1979 Columbia album Woody III.

== Reissue Bonus Tracks ==
- Stepping Stones: Live at the Village Vanguard was reissued on Woody Shaw: The Complete Columbia Albums Collection in 2011. An additional CD titled "Stepping Stones Bonus Tracks" was included:
1. "It All Comes Back to You" (Onaje Allen Gumbs) - 10:14
2. "Watership Down" (Clint Houston) - 13:48
3. "Solar" (Miles Davis) - 16:20
4. "On Green Dolphin Street" (Bronisław Kaper, Ned Washington) - 16:01
5. "Days of Wine and Roses" (Henry Mancini, Johnny Mercer) - 13:40

== Personnel ==
- Woody Shaw - cornet, flugelhorn
- Carter Jefferson - tenor saxophone, soprano saxophone
- Onaje Allan Gumbs - piano
- Clint Houston - bass
- Victor Lewis - drums
