= Have You Heard Judi Singh? =

- Directed by: Baljit Sangra
- Written by: Baljit Sangra
- Produced by: Brishkay Ahmed; Baljit Sangra
- Starring: Judi Singh
- Cinematography: Eva Brownstein; Cliff Hokanson
- Edited by: John Adams
- Music by: Genevieve Vincent
- Distributed by: Knowledge Network
- Release date: May 4, 2025 (DOXA)
- Running time: 79 minutes
- Country: Canada
- Language: English

Have You Heard Judi Singh? is a Canadian documentary film, directed by Baljit Sangra and released in 2025. The film is a portrait of Judi Singh, a Canadian jazz singer of mixed Black Canadian and Punjabi Canadian heritage who was a significant figure in Canadian music in the 1960s but later went on to become relatively forgotten.

The film was made with the participation of Singh's daughter, filmmaker Emily Hughes.

The film premiered on May 4, 2025, at the DOXA Documentary Film Festival.

== Critical response ==
Liam Lacey of Original Cin wrote that "Have You Heard Judi Singh? features many men — musicians, producers, and family members — offering commentary, but scenes with women are more interactive, involving reunions and hugs. In one of those arranged encounters, Hughes meets actor Tantoo Cardinal, who lived at Singh’s house in the seventies. In another sequence, Hughes travels to Los Angeles to meet with her childhood friend, actor Rae Dawn Chong, whose biological mother, Abigail Toulson, was a friend [of] Singh’s, and who talks about the frustrations of an artist and woman of colour and the power of what Chong calls 'Canadian Black women’s magic'."
