= Little Red's Fantasy =

Studio album by Woody Shaw
- Released: 1978
- Recorded: June 29, 1976
- Studios: Blue Rock, New York City
- Genre: Jazz
- Length: 39:02
- Labels: Muse; MR 5103
- Producer: Michael Cuscuna

Woody Shaw chronology
Love Dance (1975)	Little Red's Fantasy (1978)	The Woody Shaw Concert Ensemble at the Berliner Jazztage (1976)

Little Red's Fantasy is an album led by trumpet player Woody Shaw. It was recorded in 1976 and released on the Muse label. Little Red's Fantasy was reissued by Mosaic Records as part of Woody Shaw: The Complete Muse Sessions in 2013.

== Reception ==
Professional ratings
Review scores
Source	Rating
AllMusic	4/5 stars
DownBeat	4.5/5 stars
The Rolling Stone Jazz Record Guide	4/5 stars

Reviewing a reissue, the Detroit Free Press wrote: "Shaw applied the lessons of John Coltrane to a conception rooted in hard bop. The result was an angular, saxophone-like style and a complex harmonic language spiced by dissonance and unusually wide intervals—his serpentine improvisations weave in and out of chords like a taxi through New York traffic." DownBeat reviewer Chuck Berg wrote, "Shaw was at the top of his game for the '76 Muse date... This is the real Woody Shaw ... the ensembles and solos here crackle with emotion, drama and virtuosity".

Scott Yanow of AllMusic stated that "the varied originals give the musicians strong foundations for their freewheeling and spontaneous solos, making this one of Woody Shaw's better recordings."

== Track listing ==
All compositions by Woody Shaw except as indicated

1. "Jean Marie" (Ronnie Mathews) - 7:42
2. "Sashianova" (Stafford James) - 10:00
3. "In Case You Haven't Heard" - 6:26
4. "Little Red's Fantasy" - 7:05
5. "Tomorrow's Destiny" - 7:46

== Personnel ==
- Woody Shaw – trumpet
- Frank Strozier – alto saxophone
- Ronnie Mathews – piano
- Stafford James – bass
- Eddie Moore – drums
