= For Sure! (Woody Shaw album) =

Studio album by Woody Shaw
- Released: 1980
- Recorded: December 17, 18, 20 & 27, 1979; CBS 52nd Street Studio B, New York City
- Genre: Jazz
- Length: 41:34
- Label: Columbia; JC 35977
- Producer: Michael Cuscuna

Woody Shaw chronology
Woody III (1979)	For Sure! (1980)	United (1981)

For Sure is an album led by trumpeter Woody Shaw which was recorded in 1979 and released on the Columbia label.

== Reception ==
Professional ratings
Review scores
Source	Rating
Allmusic	4/5 stars
The Rolling Stone Jazz Record Guide	3/5 stars

Scott Yanow of Allmusic stated, "There are originals performed by Shaw, Singh, Willis, and Lewis, but it is the trumpeter's feature on "We'll Be Together Again" with the strings that ends up being most memorable".

== Track listing ==
All compositions by Woody Shaw except as indicated

1. "We'll Be Together Again" (Carl T. Fischer, Frankie Laine) – 5:44
2. "OPEC" – 5:24
3. "Time Is Right" (Judi Singh) – 4:27
4. "Ginseng People" – 5:30
5. "Why?" (Victor Lewis) – 4:51
6. "Joshua C." – 7:11
7. "Isabel the Liberator" (Larry Willis) – 8:27
8. "Teotihuacan" (Stafford James) – 7:15 (on Woody Shaw: The Complete Columbia Albums Collection only)
- Recorded at the CBS 52nd Street Studio B in New York City on December 17 (tracks 3 & 5), December 18 (track 7), December 20 (track 4), and December 27 (tracks 1 & 2), 1979 with overdubbed strings recorded on January 4, 1980
- For Sure! was reissued on Woody Shaw: The Complete Columbia Albums Collection in 2011.

== Personnel ==
- Woody Shaw – trumpet, flugelhorn
- James Spaulding – flute (tracks 3, 5 & 7)
- Gary Bartz – alto saxophone (tracks 2, 3, & 5–7)
- Carter Jefferson – soprano saxophone, tenor saxophone (tracks 3–8)
- Curtis Fuller – trombone (tracks 3–7)
- Steve Turre – trombone, bass trombone (tracks 2, 3, 5 & 7)
- Larry Willis – piano
- Stafford James – bass
- Victor Lewis – drums
- Naná Vasconcelos – percussion (tracks 3, 5 & 7)
- Judi Singh – vocals (tracks 3 & 5)
- Gayle Dixon, Winterton Garvey – violin (tracks 1 & 3)
- Maxine Roach, Veronica Salas – viola (tracks 1 & 3)
- Akua Dixon, Richard Locker – cello (tracks 1 & 3)
