= Song for My Father (album) =

1965 studio album by the Horace Silver Quintet

Studio album by the Horace Silver Quintet
- Released: End of January 1965
- Recorded: October 31, 1963; January 28 and October 26, 1964
- Studio: Van Gelder, Englewood Cliffs
- Genre: Hard bop
- Length: 42:12 original LP; 59:59 CD
- Label: Blue Note; BST 84185
- Producer: Alfred Lion

The Horace Silver Quintet chronology
Silver's Serenade (1963)	Song for My Father (1965)	The Cape Verdean Blues (1965)

Alternative cover
- RVG edition

Song for My Father is a 1965 album by the Horace Silver Quintet, released on the Blue Note label in 1965. The album was inspired by a trip that Silver had made to Brazil. The cover artwork features a photograph of Silver's father, John Tavares Silver, to whom the title composition was dedicated. "My mother was of Irish and Negro descent, my father of Portuguese origin," Silver recalls in the liner notes: "He was born on the island of Maio, one of the Cape Verde Islands."

== Music and reception ==
Professional ratings
Review scores
Source	Rating
AllMusic	5/5 stars
DownBeat	4/5 stars
The Encyclopedia of Popular Music	5/5 stars
The Penguin Guide to Jazz	4/4 stars
The Rolling Stone Jazz Record Guide	4/5 stars

The composition "Song for My Father" is probably Silver's best known. As described in the liner notes, this album features the leader's quintet in transition as it features a mix of tracks featuring his old group and his new line-up after Blue Mitchell had left.

AllMusic reviewer Steve Huey praised the album: "One of Blue Note's greatest mainstream hard bop dates, Song for My Father is Horace Silver's signature LP and the peak of a discography already studded with classics ... it hangs together remarkably well, and Silver's writing is at his tightest and catchiest." It was identified by Scott Yanow in his AllMusic essay "Hard Bop" as one of the 17 Essential Hard Bop recordings.

== Track listing ==
All compositions by Horace Silver, except where noted.

1. "Song for My Father" – 7:17
2. "The Natives Are Restless Tonight" – 6:09
3. "Calcutta Cutie" – 8:31
4. "Que Pasa" – 7:47
5. "The Kicker" (Joe Henderson) – 5:26
6. "Lonely Woman" – 7:02

Bonus tracks on CD reissue:

7. "Sanctimonious Sam" (Musa Kaleem) – 3:52
8. "Que Pasa (Trio Version)" – 5:38
9. "Sighin' and Cryin'" – 5:27
10. "Silver Treads Among My Soul" – 3:50

Recorded on October 31, 1963 (#3, 6, 7, 8); January 28, 1964 (#9–10); October 26, 1964 (#1, 2, 4, 5).

== Personnel ==
Tracks 1, 2, 4, 5

- Horace Silver – piano
- Carmell Jones – trumpet (solo 2 and 5, ensemble 1 and 4)
- Joe Henderson – tenor saxophone
- Teddy Smith – bass
- Roger Humphries – drums

Tracks 3, 7, 9, 10

- Horace Silver – piano
- Blue Mitchell – trumpet (ensemble)
- Junior Cook – tenor saxophone (ensemble)
- Gene Taylor – bass
- Roy Brooks – drums

Tracks 6, 8

- Horace Silver – piano
- Gene Taylor – bass
- Roy Brooks – drums
