= Master of the Art =

Live album by Woody Shaw
- Released: May 1982
- Recorded: February 25, 1982
- Venues: Jazz Forum, New York City
- Genre: Jazz
- Labels: Elektra/Musician; 60131
- Producer: Michael Cuscuna

Woody Shaw chronology
Lotus Flower (1982)	Master of the Art (1982)	Night Music (1982)

Master of the Art is a live album led by trumpeter Woody Shaw which was recorded in New York City on 25 February 1982 at the Jazz Forum and released on the Elektra/Musician label. Shaw's subsequent album, Night Music, was recorded at the same appearance and date.

== Reception ==
Professional ratings
Review scores
Source	Rating
Allmusic	4/5 stars
The Rolling Stone Jazz Record Guide	3/5 stars
The Virgin Encyclopedia of Jazz	3/5 stars

Michael G. Nastos of Allmusic stated, "Master of the Art is another example of how Woody Shaw was at the top of his game before he died... and why he was revered as a force to be reckoned with".

== Track listing ==
All compositions by Woody Shaw except as indicated

1. "400 Years Ago Tomorrow" (Walter Davis, Jr.) - 10:22
2. "Diane" (Lew Pollack, Erno Rapee) - 10:27
3. "Misterioso" (Thelonious Monk) - 17:16
4. "Sweet Love of Mine" - 9:41
5. The Woody Shaw Interview - 2:40

== Personnel ==
- Woody Shaw - trumpet, flugelhorn
- Bobby Hutcherson - vibraphone
- Steve Turre - trombone
- Mulgrew Miller - piano
- Stafford James - bass
- Tony Reedus - drums

== Chart performance ==
Year	Chart	Position
1982	Billboard Jazz Albums	42
