= Night Music (Woody Shaw album) =

Live album by Woody Shaw
- Released: 1983
- Recorded: February 25, 1982
- Venue: Jazz Forum, New York City
- Genre: Jazz
- Length: 46:51
- Label: Elektra/Musician; 60299
- Producer: Michael Cuscuna

Woody Shaw chronology
Master of the Art (1982)	Night Music (1983)	The Time Is Right (1983)

Night Music is a live album led by trumpeter Woody Shaw which was recorded in New York City in 1982 and released on the Elektra/Musician label. Master of the Art was recorded at the same appearance and date.

== Reception ==
Professional ratings
Review scores
Source	Rating
Allmusic	4/5 stars

Michael G. Nastos of Allmusic called it, "one of his strongest efforts in the latter days of the fiery, iconic trumpeter's brilliant career".

== Track listing ==
1. "Orange Crescent" (Steve Turre) - 11:54
2. "To Kill a Brick"(Woody Shaw) - 12:15
3. "Apex" (Mulgrew Miller) - 10:51
4. "All the Things You Are" (Oscar Hammerstein II, Jerome Kern) - 12:57

== Personnel ==
- Woody Shaw - trumpet, flugelhorn
- Bobby Hutcherson - vibraphone
- Steve Turre - trombone
- Mulgrew Miller - piano
- Stafford James - bass
- Tony Reedus - drums
