= Ichi-Ban =

Studio album by Louis Hayes – Junior Cook Quintet featuring Woody Shaw
- Released: 1976
- Recorded: May 5, 1976
- Studio: Generation Sound Studios, NYC
- Genre: Jazz
- Length: 35:45
- Label: Timeless; SJP 102
- Producer: Wim Wigt

Junior Cook chronology
Junior's Cookin' (1961)	Ichi-Ban (1976)	Pressure Cooker (1977)

Louis Hayes chronology
Breath of Life (1974)	Ichi-Ban (1976)	The Real Thing (1977)

Timeless Muse Cover

Ichi-Ban is an album by the Louis Hayes – Junior Cook Quintet featuring Woody Shaw recorded in 1976 and released on the Dutch Timeless label and on Timeless Muse in the U.S.

== Reception ==
Professional ratings
Review scores
Source	Rating
Allmusic	4.5/5 stars
The Penguin Guide to Jazz Recordings	3/4 stars

The Allmusic review stated "The limited recording time (under forty minutes) is a shame since the group is such a pleasure to hear. The music retains its excitement years after it was recorded, a tribute to both the choice of tunes and the quality of playing".

== Track listing ==
1. "Ichi-Ban" (Ronnie Matthews) – 5:56
2. "Pannonica" (Thelonious Monk) – 4:48
3. "Brothers and Sisters" (Tex Allen) – 7:21
4. "The Moontrane" (Woody Shaw) – 7:06
5. "Book's Bossa" (Walter Booker) – 12:26

== Personnel ==
- Louis Hayes – drums
- Junior Cook – tenor saxophone
- Woody Shaw – trumpet (tracks 1 & 3–5)
- Ronnie Mathews – piano
- Stafford James – bass
- Guilherme Franco – percussion
