= Woody Shaw with the Tone Jansa Quartet =

Studio album by Woody Shaw
- Released: 1985
- Recorded: April 3, 1985
- Studio: Studio 44, Monster, the Netherlands
- Genre: Jazz
- Length: 40:52
- Label: Timeless; SJP 221
- Producer: Alberto Alberti

Woody Shaw chronology
Setting Standards (1983)	Woody Shaw with the Tone Jansa Quartet (1985)	Double Take (1985)

Woody Shaw with the Tone Jansa Quartet is an album led by trumpeter Woody Shaw and the Tone Janša Quartet which was recorded in the Netherlands in 1985 and released on the Timeless label.

== Reception ==
Professional ratings
Review scores
Source	Rating
Allmusic	4/5 stars

Steve Loewy of Allmusic stated, "Shaw recorded a series of outstanding hard bop albums with American musicians but there is less available of him performing with Europeans. This album is, therefore, a welcome addition to his discography... The results are strikingly enjoyable, and all in all this should please admirers of the trumpeter".

== Track listing ==
All compositions by Tone Janša

1. "Midi" - 5:55
2. "Boland" - 5:52
3. "Call Mobility" - 7:40
4. "River" - 8:19
5. "Folk Song" - 4:48
6. "May" - 8:18

== Personnel ==
- Woody Shaw - trumpet, flugelhorn
- Tone Janša - tenor saxophone, soprano saxophone, flute
- Renato Chicco - piano
- Peter Herbert - bass
- Dragan Gajić - drums
