= The Cape Verdean Blues =

Studio album by The Horace Silver Quintet Plus J.J. Johnson
- Released: Early January 1966
- Recorded: October 1 & 22, 1965
- Studio: Van Gelder, Englewood Cliffs, NJ
- Genre: Jazz
- Length: 43:43
- Label: Blue Note; BST 84220
- Producer: Alfred Lion

Horace Silver chronology
Song for My Father (1964)	The Cape Verdean Blues (1966)	The Jody Grind (1966)

Professional ratings
Review scores
Source	Rating
The Penguin Guide to Jazz	3.5/4 stars
The Rolling Stone Jazz Record Guide	4/5 stars

The Cape Verdean Blues is a 1966 album by American jazz pianist Horace Silver. The album features the quintet of Silver, trumpeter Woody Shaw, saxophonist Joe Henderson, bassist Bob Cranshaw, and drummer Roger Humphries; trombonist J. J. Johnson also appears on three tracks. The album was inspired by Silver's father, John Tavares Silva, who was born in Cape Verde.

== Track listing ==
All tracks by Horace Silver, except "Mo' Joe" by Joe Henderson.

1. "The Cape Verdean Blues" - 4:59
2. "The African Queen" - 9:36
3. "Pretty Eyes" - 7:30
4. "Nutville" - 7:15
5. "Bonita" - 8:37
6. "Mo' Joe" - 5:46

Recorded on October 1 (#1-3) and 22 (#4-6), 1965.

== Personnel ==
- Horace Silver – piano
- Woody Shaw – trumpet
- Joe Henderson – tenor saxophone
- J. J. Johnson – trombone (4–6)
- Bob Cranshaw – double bass
- Roger Humphries – drums
