= United (Woody Shaw album) =

Studio album by Woody Shaw
- Released: 1981
- Recorded: March 7, 9 & 17, 1981; Right Track Studios, New York City
- Genre: Jazz
- Length: 40:29
- Label: Columbia; FC 37390
- Producer: Michael Cuscuna

Woody Shaw chronology
| For Sure! (1980) | United (1981) | Lotus Flower (1982) |

United is an album led by trumpeter Woody Shaw which was recorded in 1981 and released on the Columbia label.

== Reception ==
Professional ratings
Review scores
| Source | Rating |
|---|---|
| Allmusic | 4/5 stars |
| The Rolling Stone Jazz Record Guide | 3/5 stars |

Scott Yanow of Allmusic stated, "Of Woody Shaw's five Columbia albums, United is the one that sounds most like a blowing session... this fairly straight-ahead and accessible yet adventurous date. Worth searching for".

== Track listing ==
All compositions by Woody Shaw except as indicated

1. "United" (Wayne Shorter) - 5:20
2. "The Greene Street Caper" - 5:29
3. "What Is This Thing Called Love?" (Cole Porter) - 9:40
4. "Pressing the Issue" (Mulgrew Miller) - 7:04
5. "Katrina Ballerina" - 5:39
6. "Blues for Wood" (Ronnie Mathews, Woody Shaw) - 7:17
- Recorded at Right Track Studios in New York City on March 7 (tracks 1, 4 & 5), March 9 (track 2) and March 17 (tracks 3 & 6), 1981
- United was reissued on Woody Shaw: The Complete Columbia Albums Collection in 2011.

== Personnel ==
- Woody Shaw - trumpet, flugelhorn
- Steve Turre - trombone
- Mulgrew Miller - piano
- Stafford James - bass
- Tony Reedus - drums
- Gary Bartz - alto saxophone (tracks 3 & 6)
