= Song of Songs (album) =

Studio album by Woody Shaw
- Released: 1973
- Recorded: September 15 & 18, 1972
- Studio: Contemporary Studios, Los Angeles
- Genre: Jazz
- Length: 37:57
- Label: Contemporary; S 7632
- Producer: Lester Koenig and John Koenig

Woody Shaw chronology
| Blackstone Legacy (1970) | Song of Songs (1973) | The Moontrane (1974) |

Song of Songs is the second album led by trumpeter Woody Shaw which was recorded in 1972 and released on the Contemporary label.

== Reception ==
Professional ratings
Review scores
| Source | Rating |
|---|---|
| Allmusic | 4/5 stars |
| The Rolling Stone Jazz Record Guide | 3/5 stars |
| The Penguin Guide to Jazz Recordings | 3.5/4 stars |

Scott Yanow of Allmusic stated, "The music falls between hard bop, modal musings and the avant-garde. Although possessing a tone similar to Freddie Hubbard's, Woody Shaw was a more advanced player and his solos throughout the date are both original and consistently exciting".

== Track listing ==
All compositions by Woody Shaw

1. "Song of Songs" - 11:37
2. "The Goat and the Archer" - 7:33
3. "Love: For the One You Can't Have" - 10:03
4. "The Awakening" - 8:44

== Personnel ==
- Woody Shaw - trumpet
- Bennie Maupin (track 2), Ramon Morris (tracks 1 & 3) - tenor saxophone
- Emanuel Boyd - flute, tenor saxophone
- George Cables - piano, electric piano
- Henry Franklin - bass
- Woody Theus - drums
