= Rosewood (album) =

Studio album by Woody Shaw
- Released: 1978
- Recorded: December 15–19, 1977
- Studio: CBS 30th Street Studio, New York City
- Genre: Hard bop, modal jazz, post-bop
- Length: 61:07
- Label: Columbia; JC 35309
- Producer: Michael Cuscuna

Woody Shaw chronology
The Iron Men (1977)	Rosewood (1978)	Stepping Stones: Live at the Village Vanguard (1978)

Rosewood is an album led by trumpter Woody Shaw, recorded in 1977 and released on the Columbia label in 1978.

== Reception ==
Professional ratings
Review scores
Source	Rating
AllMusic	5/5 stars
The Penguin Guide to Jazz Recordings	4/4 stars

Scott Yanow of AllMusic stated, "Woody Shaw's first album for a major label, Rosewood features the trumpeter with a sextet... Rosewood was a consensus Jazz Album Of The Year in 1977. This modal music ranks with his best work".

The album resulted in Shaw receiving many accolades including nominations as Talent Deserving Wider Recognition in DownBeat's International Jazz Critics Poll (1977), as well as Jazz Album of the Year and Best Trumpeter in DownBeat's Readers Poll (1978). Rosewood also received two Grammy Award Nominations for Best Jazz Instrumental Performance (Soloist) and Best Jazz Instrumental Performance (Group) (1979).

== Track listing ==
All compositions by Woody Shaw except as indicated

1. "Rosewood" - 7:11
2. "Everytime I See You" (Onaje Allan Gumbs) - 7:14
3. "The Legend of the Cheops" (Victor Lewis) - 6:03
4. "Rahsaan's Run" - 5:10
5. "Sunshowers" (Clint Houston) - 7:48
6. "Theme for Maxine" - 7:15
7. "Isabel, the Liberator" (Larry Willis) - 8:27 Bonus track on CD reissue
8. "Joshua C." - 7:09 Bonus track on CD reissue
9. "Why?" (Lewis) - 4:50 Bonus track on CD reissue
- Rosewood was reissued on Woody Shaw: The Complete Columbia Albums Collection in 2011.

== Personnel ==
- Woody Shaw - trumpet (track 1–5 & 7–9) Flugelhorn (track 6)
- Carter Jefferson - tenor saxophone, soprano saxophone (tracks 1–5 & 7–9)
- Joe Henderson - tenor saxophone (tracks 1–3 & 5–6)
- Frank Wess - flute, piccolo flute (tracks 1–3 & 5)
- Art Webb - flute (tracks 1–3 & 5)
- James Vass - soprano saxophone, alto saxophone (tracks 1–3 & 5)
- Steve Turre - trombone, bass trombone (tracks 1–3 & 5)
- Janice Robinson - trombone (tracks 1–3 & 5)
- Onaje Allan Gumbs - piano, electric piano
- Clint Houston - bass
- Victor Lewis - drums
- Sammy Figueroa - congas (tracks 1 & 3)
- Armen Halburian - percussion (tracks 1–3 & 5)
- Lois Colin - harp (track 1 & 3)
