= The Iron Men (album) =

Studio album by Woody Shaw and Anthony Braxton
- Released: 1980
- Recorded: April 6 & 13, 1977; Blue Rock Studio, New York City
- Genre: Jazz
- Length: 42:42
- Label: Muse; MR 5160
- Producer: Michael Cuscuna

Woody Shaw chronology
The Woody Shaw Concert Ensemble at the Berliner Jazztage (1976)	The Iron Men (1980)	Rosewood (1977)

The Iron Men is an album led by trumpeter Woody Shaw which was recorded in 1977 but not released on the Muse label until 1980. The Iron Men was reissued by Mosaic Records as part of Woody Shaw: The Complete Muse Sessions in 2013.

== Reception ==
Professional ratings
Review scores
Source	Rating
Allmusic	4/5 stars
The Rolling Stone Jazz Record Guide	5/5 stars

Scott Yanow of Allmusic stated, "This is a particularly interesting set by Woody Shaw (not yet reissued on CD) because it teams the trumpeter with the great saxophonist Anthony Braxton and such forward-thinking players as altoist Arthur Blythe, pianist Muhal Richard Abrams, bassist Cecil McBee and drummer Joe Chambers".

== Track listing ==
All compositions by Woody Shaw, Muhal Richard Abrams and Cecil McBee except as indicated

1. "Iron Man" (Eric Dolphy) - 6:30
2. "Jitterbug Waltz" (Fats Waller) - 8:26
3. "Symmetry" (Andrew Hill) - 8:24
4. "Diversion One" - 2:55
5. "Song of Songs" (Shaw) - 13:35
6. "Diversion Two" - 2:52

== Personnel ==
- Woody Shaw - trumpet, cornet (track 2), flugelhorn (track 4 & 6)
- Anthony Braxton - clarinet (track 2), alto saxophone (track 3), soprano saxophone (track 5)
- Arthur Blythe - alto saxophone (track 1 & 5)
- Muhal Richard Abrams - piano
- Cecil McBee - bass
- Joe Chambers (tracks 1 & 3), Victor Lewis (tracks 2 & 5) - drums
