= Watch Out (René McLean album) =

Studio album by René McLean Sextet
- Released: 1975
- Recorded: July 9, 1975
- Studio: C.I. Recording Studios, NYC
- Genre: Jazz
- Length: 45:10
- Label: SteepleChase; SCS-1037
- Producer: Nils Winther

René McLean chronology
Watch Out (1975)	In African Eyes (1993)

Watch Out is the debut album by saxophonist René McLean recorded in 1975 and released on the SteepleChase label.

== Reception ==
Professional ratings
Review scores
Source	Rating
AllMusic	4/5 stars

AllMusic reviewer Scott Yanow stated "The son of Jackie McLean, Rene did not yet have a distinctive voice, but he showed much potential for the future. His sextet hints at the innovations of the avant-garde while remaining closer to the style of Art Blakey's Jazz Messengers. It's a worthwhile if not overly memorable effort".

== Track listing ==
All compositions by René McLean except where noted.

1. "Bilad as Sudan (Land of the Blacks)" – 7:02
2. "Aida" – 5:30
3. "What It Is" – 9:05
4. "Watch Out" (Nathan Page) – 6:18
5. "Jack's Tune" (Jackie McLean) – 5:53
6. "Jihad" – 5:36
7. "Uptown Downtown" (Hubert Eaves) – 5:46

== Personnel ==
- René McLean – alto saxophone, soprano saxophone, tenor saxophone, flute
- Danny Coleman – trumpet, flugelhorn
- Nathan Page – guitar
- Hubert Eaves III – piano
- Buster Williams – bass
- Freddie Waits – drums
