= Buhaina =

Studio album by Art Blakey and the Jazz Messengers
- Released: July or August 1973
- Recorded: March 26–29, 1973
- Studio: Fantasy Studios, Berkeley, California
- Genre: Jazz
- Length: 42:00
- Label: Prestige; PR 10067
- Producer: Orrin Keepnews

Art Blakey and the Jazz Messengers chronology
Child's Dance (1972)	Buhaina (1973)	Anthenagin (1973)

Professional ratings
Review scores
Source	Rating
Allmusic	3/5 stars
DownBeat	5/5 stars
The Rolling Stone Jazz Record Guide	3/5 stars

Buhaina is an album by drummer Art Blakey and The Jazz Messengers recorded in 1973 and released on the Prestige label. The name comes from the name Blakey took for himself after conversion to Islam.

== Reception ==
Allmusic awarded the album 3 stars.

== Track listing ==
1. "Moanin'" (Bobby Timmons) – 5:31
2. "Chant for Bu" (Mickey Bass) – 8:36
3. "One for Trane" (Mickey Bass) – 6:08
4. "Mission Eternal" (Cedar Walton) – 12:10
5. "Along Came Betty" (Benny Golson) – 4:52
6. "Gertrude's Bounce" (Richie Powell) – 4:43

== Personnel ==
- Art Blakey – drums
- Woody Shaw – trumpet
- Carter Jefferson – tenor saxophone, soprano saxophone
- Cedar Walton – piano, electric piano
- Michael Howell – guitar (tracks 2–4)
- Mickey Bass – bass
- Tony Waters – congas
- Jon Hendricks – vocals (tracks 1 & 5)
