= The Woody Shaw Concert Ensemble at the Berliner Jazztage =

Live album by Woody Shaw
- Released: 1977
- Recorded: November 6, 1976; Berlin Jazz Days, Berlin
- Genre: Jazz
- Label: Muse; MR 5139
- Producer: Michael Cuscuna

Woody Shaw chronology
Little Red's Fantasy (1976)	The Woody Shaw Concert Ensemble at the Berliner Jazztage (1977)	The Iron Men (1977)

The Woody Shaw Concert Ensemble at the Berliner Jazztage is a live album led by trumpeter Woody Shaw which was recorded at the JazzFest Berlin in 1976 and released on the Muse label. The Woody Shaw Concert Ensemble at the Berliner Jazztage was reissued by Mosaic Records as part of Woody Shaw: The Complete Muse Sessions in 2013.

== Reception ==
Professional ratings
Review scores
Source	Rating
Allmusic	4.5/5 stars
The Rolling Stone Jazz Record Guide	3/5 stars

Scott Yanow of Allmusic called it a "frequently exciting and often quite advanced Berlin concert".

== Track listing ==
1. "Hello to the Wind" (Joe Chambers, Gene McDaniels) - 17:27
2. "Obsequioius" (Larry Young) - 9:10
3. "Jean Marie" (Ronnie Mathews) - 9:20
4. "In The Land of the Blacks (Bilad as Sudan)" (René McLean) - 12:24

== Personnel ==
- Woody Shaw - trumpet, percussion
- René McLean - alto saxophone, flute, percussion
- Frank Foster - tenor saxophone, soprano saxophone, percussion
- Slide Hampton - trombone, percussion
- Ronnie Mathews - piano
- Stafford James - bass
- Louis Hayes - drums
