= Teddy Smith =

American jazz musician

Theodore Smith (January 22, 1932, in Washington, D.C.—August 24, 1979, in Washington, D.C.) was an American jazz double-bassist.

Smith played with Betty Carter in 1960, and with Clifford Jordan (with whom he recorded the LP Bearcat in 1962) and Kenny Dorham in 1961-62. In 1962-63 he played with Jackie McLean and Slide Hampton. Following this he played with Horace Silver, including at the 1964 Montreux, Antibes, and Paris jazz festivals and on the album Song for My Father. Following this Smith played with Sonny Rollins (1964–65) and Sonny Simmons (1966).

Smith's performance on the title track of Song for My Father, beginning with the opening unison figure between Smith's bass and Silver's piano, has been one of the most widely heard pieces of jazz music in the world for nearly a half-century and an influence on such artists as Stevie Wonder and Steely Dan.

== Discography ==
With Kenny Dorham

- Matador (United Artists, 1962)

With Rufus Jones

- Five on Eight (Cameo, 1964)

With Clifford Jordan

- Bearcat (Jazzland, 1962)

With Sonny Rollins

- The Standard Sonny Rollins (RCA Victor, 1964)

With Horace Silver

- Song for My Father (Blue Note, 1964)
- Live 1964 (Emerald, 1984)
