= Anthenagin =

Studio album by Art Blakey and the Jazz Messengers
- Released: 1973
- Recorded: March 26–29, 1973
- Studios: Fantasy Studios, Berkeley, California
- Genre: Jazz
- Labels: Prestige; PR 10076
- Producer: Orrin Keepnews

Art Blakey and the Jazz Messengers chronology
Buhaina (1973)	Anthenagin (1973)	In Walked Sonny (1975)

Anthenagin is an album by drummer Art Blakey and The Jazz Messengers recorded in 1973 and released on the Prestige label.

== Reception ==
Professional ratings
Review scores
Source	Rating
Allmusic	4.5/5 stars
The Rolling Stone Jazz Record Guide	3/5 stars

Allmusic awarded the album 4½ stars stating "Despite Walton's occasional electric keyboards, this date returns to the feel of the earlier Jazz Messengers recordings".

== Track listing ==
All compositions by Cedar Walton except where noted.

1. "I'm Not So Sure" – 7:07
2. "Love: For the One You Can't Have" (Woody Shaw) – 6:23
3. "Fantasy in D" – 8:38
4. "Anthenagin" – 11:56
5. "Without a Song" (Vincent Youmans, Billy Rose, Edward Eliscu) – 5:35
6. "Along Came Betty" (Benny Golson) – 6:06

== Personnel ==
- Art Blakey – drums
- Woody Shaw – trumpet
- Steve Turre – trombone (tracks 2 & 3)
- Carter Jefferson – tenor saxophone, soprano saxophone
- Cedar Walton – piano, electric piano
- Michael Howell – guitar (track 6)
- Mickey Bass – bass
- Tony Waters – congas
