= Child's Dance =

Studio album by Art Blakey and the Jazz Messengers
- Released: March 1973
- Recorded: May 23 and July 8, 1972
- Studio: Van Gelder Studio, Englewood Cliffs, New Jersey
- Genre: Jazz
- Label: Prestige; PR 10076
- Producer: Ozzie Cadena

Art Blakey chronology
The Giants of Jazz (1971)	Child's Dance (1973)	Buhaina (1973)

The Jazz Messengers chronology
Jazz Messengers '70 (1970)	Child's Dance (1972)	Buhaina (1973)

Child's Dance is an album by drummer Art Blakey and The Jazz Messengers recorded in 1972 and released on the Prestige label.

== Reception ==
Professional ratings
Review scores
Source	Rating
Allmusic	3/5 stars
The Rolling Stone Jazz Record Guide	2/5 stars

Scott Yanow of Allmusic stated, "After several years of few recordings, Art Blakey's Jazz Messengers re-emerged with totally new personnel on this Prestige LP... An interesting set".

== Track listing ==
All compositions by Stanley Clarke except where noted.

1. "C.C." – 12:18
2. "Child's Dance (Christian's Song)" (Ramon Morris) – 7:40
3. "Song for a Lonely Woman" – 9:40
4. "I Can't Get Started" (Vernon Duke, Ira Gershwin) – 7:30
- Recorded at Van Gelder Studios in Englewood Cliffs New Jersey on May 23 (track 3) and July 8 (tracks 1, 2 & 4), 1972

== Personnel ==
- Art Blakey – drums
- Woody Shaw – trumpet (tracks 1, 2 & 4)
- Buddy Terry – soprano saxophone (track 3)
- Ramon Morris – tenor saxophone (tracks 1 & 2), flute (track 3)
- Manny Boyd – flute (track 2)
- George Cables – piano, electric piano (tracks 1, 2 & 4)
- John Hicks – electric piano (track 3)
- Mickey Bass (track 3), Stanley Clarke (tracks 1, 2 & 4) – bass
- Ray Mantilla (tracks 1, 2 & 4), Emanuel Rahim (track 3) – congas
- Nathaniel Bettis, Richie "Pablo" Landrum, Sonny Morgan – percussion (track 3)
