= In My Own Sweet Way =

Live album by Woody Shaw
- Released: 1989
- Recorded: February 7 & 8, 1987; Bazillus, Zurich, Switzerland
- Genre: Jazz
- Length: 62:02
- Label: In + Out; 7003

Woody Shaw chronology
Dr. Chi (1986)	In My Own Sweet Way (1989)	The Eternal Triangle (1987)

In My Own Sweet Way is a live album led by trumpeter Woody Shaw which was recorded in Switzerland in 1987 and released on the German In + Out label.

== Reception ==
Professional ratings
Review scores
Source	Rating
Allmusic	4/5 stars

Scott Yanow of Allmusic stated, "Although trumpeter Woody Shaw never really broke through to gain the recognition he deserved, he also never recorded an unworthy album... Excellent advanced hard bop".

== Track listing ==
All compositions by Woody Shaw except as indicated

1. "The Organ Grinder" - 8:33
2. "In Your Own Sweet Way" (Dave Brubeck) - 8:33
3. "The Dragon" (Fred Henke) - 8:41
4. "Just a Ballad for Woody" - 10:03
5. "Sippin' at Bells" (Miles Davis) - 7:21
6. "Estaté" (Bruno Martino) - 5:19
7. "Joshua C." - 13:32

== Personnel ==
- Woody Shaw - trumpet
- Fred Henke - piano
- Neil Swainson - bass
- Alexander Deutsch - drums
