= Natural Essence =

Studio album by Tyrone Washington
- Released: May 1968
- Recorded: December 29, 1967
- Studio: Van Gelder Studio, Englewood Cliffs, NJ
- Genre: Jazz
- Length: 38:37
- Label: Blue Note
- Producer: Duke Pearson, Francis Wolff

Tyrone Washington chronology
Natural Essence (1968)	Roots (1973)

Natural Essence is the debut album by American saxophonist Tyrone Washington featuring performances recorded in 1967 and released on the Blue Note label.

== Reception ==
The Allmusic review by Ken Dryden awarded the album 4½ stars stating "Only 23 at the time of the recording, the tenor saxophonist composed six originals and is joined by other promising young lions who went onto great careers... Washington shows the influence of John Coltrane during his rapid-fire runs, while his playing during his more straight-ahead works proves to be more memorable".

Professional ratings
Review scores
Source	Rating
Allmusic	4.5/5 stars

== Track listing ==
All compositions by Tyrone Washington

1. "Natural Essence" - 5:01
2. "Yearning for Love" - 6:27
3. "Positive Path" - 8:06
4. "Soul Dance" - 8:02
5. "Ethos" - 6:14
6. "Song of Peace" - 5:11

- Recorded at Rudy Van Gelder Studio in Englewood Cliffs, New Jersey on December 29, 1967

== Personnel ==
- Tyrone Washington - tenor saxophone
- Woody Shaw - trumpet (tracks 1–5)
- James Spaulding - alto saxophone, flute (tracks 1–5)
- Kenny Barron - piano (tracks 1–5)
- Reggie Workman - bass
- Joe Chambers - drums
