= Mickey Bass =

American bassist (1943–2022)

- Born: Lee Oddis Bass III; May 2, 1943; Pittsburgh, Pennsylvania, U.S.
- Died: February 3, 2022 (aged 78) New York City, New York, U.S.
- Genres: Jazz
- Occupation: Musician
- Instrument: Bass
- Years active: 1960s–2022
- Website: www.rainbowjazz.com

Lee Odiss Bass III (May 2, 1943 – February 3, 2022), better known as Mickey Bass, was an American bassist, composer, arranger, and music educator. He played with Chico Freeman, John Hicks, and Kiane Zawadi.

Known for having a exceptional ear for music, Bass was a Pittsburgh bassist who worked with hard bop bandleaders and combos from the 1960s; he did not record often as a leader. His maternal grandmother, who performed in minstrel shows, taught him and his cousins Barbershop music. He played and recorded with Sonny Rollins, Bennie Green, and Charles Mingus. The New York Times declared: "When Mickey Bass and the Co-operation get in the right groove...it is doubtful if there is another jazz group in town that swings as hard as this one."

He taught students at Duke Ellington School of the Arts and Hartt College of Music from 1975 to 1985. His students at Ellington included Wallace Roney, Gregory Charles Royal, Clarence Seay, and drummer Eric Allen. In 1980, he was given a National Endowment for the Arts Composers' Grant.

Bass died in New York City on February 3, 2022, at the age of 78.

== Discography ==
=== As leader ===
- Sentimental Mood (Chiaroscuro, 1982)
- The Co-operation (Early Bird, 1991)
- Another Way Out (Early Bird, 1991)

=== As sideman ===
With Art Blakey

- Child's Dance (Prestige, 1972)
- Buhaina (Prestige, 1973)
- Anthenagin (Prestige, 1973)

With Curtis Fuller

- Smokin' (Mainstream, 1972)

With Philly Joe Jones

- Mean What You Say (Sonet, 1977)

With Jimmy McGriff

- Concert: Friday the 13th - Cook County Jail (Groove Merchant. 1972 [1973])

With Hank Mobley

- Thinking of Home (Blue Note, 1973)

With Ramon Morris

- Sweet Sister Funk (Groove Merchant, 1973)

With Lee Morgan

- The Sixth Sense (Blue Note, 1968 [1999])

With Bobby Timmons

- Chicken & Dumplin's (Prestige, 1965)
- Soul Food (Prestige, 1966)

With Reuben Wilson

- The Sweet Life (Groove Merchant, 1973)
