= The Moontrane =

Studio album by Woody Shaw
- Released: 1975
- Recorded: December 11 & 18, 1974
- Studios: Blue Rock Studios, New York City
- Genre: Jazz
- Length: 58:19
- Label: Muse
- Producer: Michael Cuscuna

Woody Shaw chronology
Song of Songs (1972)	The Moontrane (1975)	Love Dance (1975)

The Moontrane is the third album led by trumpeter Woody Shaw which was recorded in 1974 and released on the Muse label. The Moontrane was released as part of Woody Shaw: The Complete Muse Sessions by Mosaic Records in 2013.

== Reception ==
Professional ratings
Review scores
Source	Rating
Allmusic	4.5/5 stars
The Rolling Stone Jazz Record Guide	4/5 stars

Scott Yanow of Allmusic stated, "the adventurous music still sounds stimulating more than two decades later. Recommended".

== Track listing ==
All compositions by Woody Shaw except as indicated

1. "The Moontrane" – 6:54
2. "Sanyas" (Steve Turre) – 13:05
3. "Tapscott's Blues" (Azar Lawrence) – 6:41
4. "Katrina Ballerina" – 7:36
5. "Are They Only Dreams?" (Onaje Allan Gumbs) – 9:12 Bonus track on CD reissue
6. "Tapscott's Blues" [Alternate Take] (Lawrence) – 6:50 Bonus track on CD reissue
7. "Katrina Ballerina" [Alternate Take] – 8:01 Bonus track on CD reissue

== Personnel ==
- Woody Shaw – trumpet
- Steve Turre – trombone
- Azar Lawrence – tenor saxophone, soprano saxophone
- Onaje Allan Gumbs – piano, electric piano
- Cecil McBee (tracks 2–4 & 6–7), Buster Williams (tracks 1 & 5) – bass
- Victor Lewis – drums
- Guilherme Franco – percussion (tracks 2, 4–5 & 7), Tony Waters (tracks 2, 4–5 & 7) – percussion
