= Solid (Woody Shaw album) =

Studio album by Woody Shaw
- Released: 1987
- Recorded: March 24, 1986
- Studio: Van Gelder Studio, Englewood Cliffs, New Jersey
- Genre: Jazz
- Length: 39:40
- Label: Muse; MR 5329
- Producer: Michael Cuscuna

Woody Shaw chronology
Bemsha Swing (1986)	Solid (1987)	Dr. Chi (1986)

Solid is an album led by trumpeter Woody Shaw which was recorded in 1986 and released on the Muse label. Solid was reissued by Mosaic Records as part of Woody Shaw: The Complete Muse Sessions in 2013.

== Reception ==
Professional ratings
Review scores
Source	Rating
AllMusic	4.5/5 stars

Scott Yanow of AllMusic stated, "This CD serves as a perfect introduction to the memorable but always underrated trumpeter Woody Shaw, who tragically had only three years left to live".

== Track listing ==
1. "There Will Never Be Another You" (Mack Gordon, Harry Warren) – 6:59
2. "You Stepped Out of a Dream" (Nacio Herb Brown, Gus Kahn) – 5:32
3. "Speak Low" (Ogden Nash, Kurt Weill) – 8:58
4. "Solid" (Sonny Rollins) – 4:41
5. "It Might as Well Be Spring" (Oscar Hammerstein II, Richard Rodgers) – 10:06
6. "The Woody Woodpecker Song" (Ramey Idriss, George Tibbles) – 3:46

== Personnel ==
- Woody Shaw – trumpet
- Kenny Garrett – alto saxophone
- Kenny Barron – piano
- Peter Leitch – guitar
- Neil Swainson – bass
- Victor Jones – drums
