= Carter Jefferson =

American jazz musician

Carter Jefferson (1946 – 9 December 1993) was an American jazz tenor saxophonist.

== Biography ==
Jefferson played clarinet and alto saxophone early in his career, playing in the backing bands for The Temptations, The Supremes, and Little Richard in the 1960s. In 1971, he entered New York University, and played with Mongo Santamaría and with Art Blakey's Jazz Messengers. Between 1977 and 1980 he performed and recorded with Woody Shaw. Following this, Jefferson spent time with Elvin Jones, Roy Haynes, Cedar Walton, Jerry Gonzalez, Malachi Thompson, Barbara Donald, and Jack Walrath. His only record as a bandleader was the 1978 release The Rise of Atlantis, produced by Woody Shaw. A heavy drinker and smoker for most of his life, he died in Kraków, Poland, in 1993 after an emergency surgical procedure; he had been suffering from cirrhosis, kidney failure, stomach ulcers, a hemorrhaging esophagus, acute circulatory failure, and other maladies.

== Discography ==
=== As leader ===
- 1978: The Rise of Atlantis (Timeless Muse) with Terumasa Hino, Harry Whitaker, Clint Houston, Victor Lewis, Steve Thornton, Lani Groves, Shunzo Ohno, John Hicks

=== As sideman ===
With Art Blakey

- Buhaina (Prestige, 1973)
- Anthenagin (Prestige, 1973)

With Walter Davis, Jr.

- Illumination (1977)

With Woody Shaw

- Rosewood (Columbia, 1977)
- Stepping Stones: Live at the Village Vanguard (Columbia, 1978)
- Woody III (Columbia, 1979)
- For Sure! (Columbia, 1979)
- Woody Shaw Quartet Basel 1980 (Elemental Music, 2019)

With Barbara Donald

- Barbara Donald and Unity: Olympia Live (Cadence Jazz Records, 1982)
- Barbara Donald and Unity: The Past and Tomorrows (Cadence Jazz Records, 1983)

With Malachi Thompson

- Spirit (Delmark, 1983)
- The Jaz Life (Delmark, 1992)
- Lift Every Voice (Delmark, 1993)
- New Standards (Delmark, 1993)
- 47th Street (Delmark, 1997)
- Freebop Now! (Delmark, 1998)

With Jack Walrath

- Master of Suspense (Blue Note, 1987)
- Neohippus (Blue Note, 1988)
- Gut Feelings (Muse, 1990 [1992])

With Clifford Jordan

- The Mellow Side of Clifford Jordan (Mapleshade, 1989-91 [1997])
