= Song for My Father (composition) =

Composition by jazz pianist Horace Silver

Composition by Horace Silver

from the album Song for My Father
- Recorded: October 26, 1964
- Genre: Jazz; hard bop; bossa nova; latin
- Label: Blue Note
- Composer: Horace Silver
- Producer: Alfred Lion

"Song for My Father" is a composition by jazz pianist Horace Silver. The original version, on the album of the same name by Silver's quintet, was recorded on October 26, 1964. It has become a jazz standard and is probably Silver's best-known composition. According to Silver, the song was "in part inspired by our Brazilian trip. We got the Brazilian rhythm for this tune from that trip, and the melodic line was inspired by some very old Cape Verdean Portuguese folk music."

== Composition ==
"Song for My Father" has a 24-bar AAB construction and is in 4/4 time. It was composed in F minor. It is in the bossa nova style and features a bass ostinato. "It contains only four chords: Fm^{9}–E♭^{9}–D♭^{9}–C^{9}. The piece uses even eighth notes throughout, not swing eighths."

In his biography, Silver describes composing the song while attempting to use the bossa nova rhythm he had observed in Brazil. However, the melody reminded him of the Cape Verdean music he had heard from his father.

== Original recording ==
The original version featured Silver on piano, with Joe Henderson (tenor saxophone), Carmell Jones (trumpet), Teddy Smith (bass), and Roger Humphries (drums). It was recorded in Englewood Cliffs, New Jersey, on October 26, 1964. It was first released on the album of the same name.

The opening vamp [...] leads to one of Silver's most affecting themes, and then to perfect solos by, respectively, the leader and Joe Henderson. Henderson's is one of the great motivically based solos in recorded jazz; all derived from his three opening notes.

In his improvisations on the track,

Silver evokes historical precedents in his use of blue notes, blues scale, and the use of mixolydian modal concepts on the dominant chord, and a swinging rhythm punctuated with silence. He also uses a blues scale on the dominant and tonic (F) chords, and flat thirds, fifths and sevenths.

In the second chorus, from the 25th bar, "Silver changes from harmony in thirds to harmony in fourths".

Two aspects of the accompaniment are just as important as the melody itself. First, the bassist plays only roots and fifths of the chords [...] Second, the rhythm section breaks at measure 6 in every section. Both the bass pattern and the one-measure break occur consistently during the solos as well as the theme choruses, and provide an extra degree of continuity that helps tie the whole performance together.

== Later versions and use ==
As of 2014, more than 180 versions of the song have been recorded.

Ethiopian musician Mulatu Astatke’s song “Yèkèrmo Sèw” is based on “Song for my Father,” but set in tizita, a pentatonic mode.

The composition's opening bass piano notes were borrowed by Steely Dan for their 1974 song "Rikki Don't Lose That Number".
