= Woody III =

Studio album by Woody Shaw
- Released: 1979
- Recorded: August 5, 1978; January 18 & 24, 1979
- Studio: Village Vanguard, C & I Recording Studio, CBS 52nd Street Studio B, New York City
- Genre: Jazz
- Label: Columbia
- Producer: Michael Cuscuna

Woody Shaw chronology
Stepping Stones: Live at the Village Vanguard (1978)	Woody III (1979)	For Sure! (1980)

Woody III is an album by trumpeter Woody Shaw which was recorded in 1979 (with one live track from 1978) and released on the Columbia label.

Woody III is Shaw's third Columbia album and is named for his newborn son at the time, Woody Louis Armstrong Shaw III. The album is dedicated to the Shaw family legacy, beginning with a piece for Shaw's father, who was a vocalist with the Diamond Jubilee Singers, a second suite for himself, and a third suite for his son, Woody III (Woody I, II and III, respectively).

In an interview for WRVR in New York City in 1980, Shaw stated the following:

"The first part which is called Woody I: On the New Ark is a tribute to my father. It musically conveys my appreciation of my musical heritage. Woody II: Other Paths is also a tribute to my musical past, but is based more on my actual playing experiences. This part has a very creative edge to it, and I think it shows my constantly moving forward and exploring 'other paths.' The last part, Woody III: New Offerings is dedicated to my son, Woody Louis Armstrong Shaw the Third. It expresses my hope for him and for his children. Musically, it's connected to the other two parts, but it also stands on its own as a complete tune. I want my son to grow up, feeling that he, too, can stand on his own, but always has the support of his family."

== Reception ==
Professional ratings
Review scores
Source	Rating
Allmusic	4/5 stars
The Rolling Stone Jazz Record Guide	4/5 stars
DownBeat	5/5 stars

Scott Yanow of Allmusic stated, "He is in peak form throughout, and the strong compositions (along with some adventurous solos) make this one of Woody Shaw's most essential recordings".

DownBeat awarded this release 5 stars. Reviewing the album Douglas Clark wrote, "WoodyI II is his [Woody Shaw] strongest statement on wax to date".

== Track listing ==
All compositions by Woody Shaw except as indicated

1. "Woody I: On the New Ark" - 7:15
2. "Woody II: Other Paths" - 6:50
3. "Woody III: New Offerings" - 8:28
4. "To Kill a Brick" - 7:40
5. "Organ Grinder" - 5:30
6. "Escape Velocity" (Clint Houston) - 11:14
- Recorded at the Village Vanguard in New York City on August 5, 1978 (track 6), at C & I Recording Studio in New York City on January 18, 1979 (tracks 1–4) and at CBS 52nd Street Studio B in New York City on January 24, 1979 (track 5)
- Woody III was reissued on Woody Shaw: The Complete Columbia Albums Collection in 2011.

== Personnel ==
- Woody Shaw - cornet, flugelhorn
- Charles Sullivan - trumpet (tracks 1 & 2)
- René McLean - soprano saxophone, alto saxophone, flute (tracks 1–4)
- James Spaulding - alto saxophone, flute (tracks 1–4)
- Carter Jefferson - tenor saxophone (tracks 1–3 & 6)
- Curtis Fuller - trombone (tracks 1–3)
- Steve Turre - trombone, bass trombone (tracks 1–3)
- George Cables (track 5), Onaje Allan Gumbs (tracks 1–4 & 6) - piano
- Clint Houston (track 6), Buster Williams (tracks 1–5) - bass
- Victor Lewis - drums
- Azzedin Weston - congas, percussion (tracks 1 & 3)
- Nobu Urushiyama - percussion (tracks 1 & 3)
- Amiri Baraka - liner notes
