= Lotus Flower (Woody Shaw album) =

Studio album by Woody Shaw
- Released: 1982
- Recorded: January 7, 1982; Vanguard Studios, New York City
- Genre: Jazz
- Length: 42:42
- Label: Enja; Enja 4018
- Producer: Horst Weber

Woody Shaw chronology
United (1981)	Lotus Flower (1982)	Master of the Art (1982)

Lotus Flower is an album led by trumpeter Woody Shaw which was recorded in 1982 and released on the Enja label.

== Reception ==
Professional ratings
Review scores
Source	Rating
AllMusic	4/5 stars
The Rolling Stone Jazz Record Guide	3/5 stars

Scott Yanow of AllMusic stated, "This CD features one of trumpeter Woody Shaw's finest groups... Virtually every Woody Shaw recording is well worth acquiring, including this one."

== Track listing ==
All compositions by Woody Shaw except as indicated

1. "Eastern Joy Dance" (Mulgrew Miller) – 9:41
2. "Game" (Stafford James) – 6:42
3. "Lotus Flower" (Steve Turre) – 6:58
4. "Rahsaan's Run" – 8:00
5. "Song of Songs" – 11:21

== Personnel ==
- Woody Shaw – trumpet, flugelhorn
- Steve Turre – trombone
- Mulgrew Miller – piano
- Stafford James – bass
- Tony Reedus – drums
