= Thinking of Home =

Studio album by Hank Mobley
- Released: 1980
- Recorded: July 31, 1970
- Studio: Van Gelder Studio; Englewood Cliffs, NJ
- Genre: Jazz
- Length: 42:55
- Label: Blue Note
- Producer: Duke Pearson, Francis Wolff

Hank Mobley chronology
The Flip (1969)	Thinking of Home (1980)	Breakthrough! (1972)

Thinking of Home is an album by American jazz saxophonist Hank Mobley, recorded on July 31, 1970, but not released by Blue Note until 1980. The sextet features trumpeter Woody Shaw, pianist Cedar Walton, guitarist Eddie Diehl, bassist Mickey Bass, and drummer Leroy Williams. This was Mobley's 26th (and final) recording for Blue Note.

== Reception ==
Professional ratings
Review scores
Source	Rating
AllMusic	4.5/5 stars
The Penguin Guide to Jazz Recordings	3/4 stars
The Rolling Stone Jazz Record Guide	3/5 stars

The AllMusic review by Scott Yanow states, "It is only fitting that Hank Mobley would record one of the last worthwhile Blue Note albums before its artistic collapse (it would not be revived until the 1980s) for his consistent output helped define the label's sound in the 1960s".

On All About Jazz, Richton Guy Thomas wrote, "this is a fitting farewell session. It features the powerful trumpet playing of Woody Shaw and the exciting pianist Cedar Walton. Hank Mobley's playing has a fire that ought to remind you of the Jazz Messengers, as it should since he was one of the original members of the group ... Thinking of Home should remind diehard jazz fans (and enlighten those newer to the genre) that Mobley was an innovative and stimulating tenor saxophonist who consistently swung."

== Track listing ==
All tracks are written by Hank Mobley, except as noted.

Side 1
No.	Title	Length
1.	"Suite: Thinking of Home/The Flight/Home at Last"	10:06
2.	"Justine"	13:04

Side 2
No.	Title	Writer(s)	Length
1.	"You Gotta Hit It"		5:34
2.	"Gayle's Groove"	Mickey Bass	5:33
3.	"Talk About Gittin' It"		8:38

== Personnel ==
- Hank Mobley – tenor saxophone
- Woody Shaw – trumpet
- Cedar Walton – piano
- Eddie Diehl – guitar
- Mickey Bass – bass
- Leroy Williams – drums
