= The Real Thing (Louis Hayes album) =

Studio album by Louis Hayes
- Released: 1978
- Recorded: May 20–21, 1977
- Studio: C.I. Recording Studio, NYC
- Genre: Jazz
- Length: 37:06
- Label: Muse; MR 5125
- Producer: Michael Cuscuna

Louis Hayes chronology
Ichi-Ban (1976)	The Real Thing (1978)	Variety Is the Spice (1978)

The Real Thing is an album led by drummer Louis Hayes which was recorded in 1977 and released on the Muse label.

== Reception ==
Professional ratings
Review scores
Source	Rating
Allmusic	4.5/5 stars

The Allmusic review stated "On three little-known tunes and a trio of group originals, the modern hard bop unit plays concise but meaningful solos; a different combination of musicians gets the solo spotlight on each song. A well-conceived and continually interesting session".

== Track listing ==
1. "St. Peter's Walk" (Tex Allen) – 5:20
2. "Nisha" (Louis Hayes) – 9:22
3. "Loose Suite" (Ronnie Mathews) – 4:55
4. "My Gift to You" (Stafford James) – 7:00
5. "Jack's Tune" (Jackie McLean) – 5:14
6. "Marilyn's House" (Allen) – 5:15

== Personnel ==
- Louis Hayes – drums
- Woody Shaw – trumpet, flugelhorn
- Slide Hampton – trombone (tracks 4–6)
- Rene McLean – soprano saxophone, alto saxophone, tenor saxophone (tracks 1 & 3–6)
- Ronnie Mathews – piano
- Stafford James – bass
