= The Jody Grind =

Studio album by Horace Silver
- Released: Early March 1967
- Recorded: November 2 & 23, 1966
- Studio: Van Gelder Studio, Englewood Cliffs, New Jersey
- Genre: Jazz
- Length: 39:39
- Label: Blue Note; BST 84250
- Producer: Alfred Lion

Horace Silver chronology
The Cape Verdean Blues (1965)	The Jody Grind (1967)	Serenade to a Soul Sister (1968)

Professional ratings
Review scores
Source	Rating
Allmusic	4.5/5 stars
The Penguin Guide to Jazz	4/4 stars

The Jody Grind is a 1966 recording by Horace Silver featuring both a quintet and a sextet. Released the following year on his longtime label Blue Note, it peaked No. 8 of the Billboard jazz album charts. As one of his "groove-centered" recordings it would "wind up as possibly the most challenging", Steve Huey writes on Allmusic, and gave "one of the most underappreciated" of Silver's albums 4½ stars.

== Track listing ==
All tracks composed by Horace Silver

1. "The Jody Grind" – 5:50
2. "Mary Lou" – 7:09
3. "Mexican Hip Dance" – 5:53
4. "Blue Silver" – 5:59
5. "Grease Piece" – 7:31
6. "Dimples" – 7:17

Recorded on November 2 (#1, 3, 6) and 23 (#2, 4–5), 1966.

== Personnel ==
- Horace Silver – piano
- Woody Shaw – trumpet
- Tyrone Washington – tenor sax
- James Spaulding – alto sax on tracks 2, 4, 5, flute solo on 2
- Larry Ridley – bass
- Roger Humphries – drums
