= René McLean =

American jazz musician

- Born: December 16, 1946 (age 79); New York City, New York, U.S.
- Genres: Jazz; South African jazz
- Occupation: Musician
- Instruments: Saxophone; flute

René McLean (born December 16, 1946) is a hard bop saxophonist and flutist from New York City. He started playing guitar before receiving an alto saxophone and instruction from his father, alto saxophonist Jackie McLean.

== Biography ==
McLean played in the mid-1970s in a quintet with Woody Shaw and Louis Hayes and toured with Hugh Masekela in 1978.

He later studied music at New York College of Music and the University of Massachusetts Amherst. McLean received the Creative Artist Fellowship by the Japan-U.S. Friendship Commission and the National Endowment for the Arts in 1986 to reside in Japan to research traditional Japanese music, arts and culture, and to perform and teach. He has recorded extensively and also has thorough experience as a music educator in the United States and South Africa.

Born in New York City, René McLean, multi-reed instrumentalist (alto, tenor, soprano saxophones, flutes, ney, shakuhachi), composer, band leader, educator, and producer, began his musical training at the age of nine under the tutelage and guidance of his father, alto saxophonist and educator Jackie McLean. René made his debut with Jackie McLean's band in the mid-1960s and led his own bands. René McLean's debut as a band leader and producer began at the age of 16 in 1963.

René McLean continued his studies with his stepfather as well as with the Jazz Arts Society, HARYOU ACT Cultural Program under Julian Yule, Rheet Taylor, Jackie McLean and Kenny Dorham; the Clark Terry Youth Band, Jazz Mobile and later at the New York College of Music (New York University) and the University of Massachusetts. In addition he studied privately with instructors including Sonny Rollins, Frank Foster, George Coleman, Kenny Dorham, Jackie Byard, Barry Harris and Hubert Laws.

René has performed and recorded as a leader and featured sideman with musicians of the Black Musical tradition, including Jackie McLean, the Dizzy Gillespie Big Band, Lionel Hampton All Stars, Tito Puente Orchestra, Horace Silver, Woody Shaw, Dr. Bill Taylor, Baba Olatunji, Hugh Masekela, Miriam Makeba, Abbey Lincoln, Dexter Gordon, James Moody, Yusef Lateef, Jaco Pastorius, Jerry Gonzales' Forte Apache Band, Hamza El Din, and in collaboration with premier poet-activist Amiri Baraka (Leroi Jones).

McLean has performed, conducted workshops and lectured at numerous universities and cultural programs in the U.S. and Caribbean (including Cuba), as well as in South America, Europe, Lebanon, Japan, Indonesia, South Africa, Lesotho, Botswana, Swaziland, Namibia, Mozambique, Zimbabwe, Madagascar and Mauritius.

From 1970 to 1973, he was bandmaster for the N.Y. State N.A.C.C. Melrose Community Center in the South Bronx. From 1984 to 1985 René was Artist-in-Residence at the University of Hartford's the Hartt School, Department of African American Music. Since 1985 McLean has been living in South Africa, where he has been performing, teaching and researching musical traditions. As consultant to the Mmabana Cultural Center he developed the foundation for the Center's music program and curriculum, subsequently heading the music program from 1987 to 1990. From 1991 to 1992 he was a visiting member of the New School Jazz program. From 1994 to 1998 McLean was a Lecturer in Jazz Studies at the University of Cape Town.

McLean is Professor of African-American music on the faculty of the Jackie McLean Institute at the Hartt School, University of Hartford. He is also the Master Artist-in-Residence of Music at the Artists Collective in Hartford, Conn.

He has been the recipient of several National Endowment for the Arts grants and fellowship awards, including the prestigious Creative Artist Fellowship by the Japan-U.S. Friendship Commission and the National Endowment for the Arts to reside in Japan to research traditional Japanese music culture, and to perform and teach. He has also spent time researching musical traditions and performing in Bali, Indonesia.

René McLean draws inspiration and insight from the rich diversity of the African-American tradition and various world music genres, with particular emphasis on Eastern and African traditions. He defines his music as "transcending socio-political and cultural boundaries - it's a universal language."

== Discography ==
=== As leader ===
- Watch Out (SteepleChase, 1975)
- In African Eyes (Triloka, 1992)
- Generations to Come (I'Jazza, 2002)

=== As sideman ===
With Walter Bishop Jr.

- Cubicle (Muse, 1978)

With Louis Hayes

- The Real Thing (Muse, 1977)

With Hugh Masekela

- Home (Moonshine, 1982)

With Jackie McLean

- New York Calling (SteepleChase, 1974)
- Dynasty (Triloka, 1990)
- Fire and Love (Blue Note, 1997)

With Woody Shaw

- Love Dance (Muse, 1975)
- The Woody Shaw Concert Ensemble at the Berliner Jazztage (Muse, 1976)
- Woody III (Columbia, 1979)
- Lausanne 1977 (TCB, 1996)

With Charles Sullivan

- Re-Entry (Whynot, 1975)
