= Blackstone Legacy =

Studio album by Woody Shaw
- Released: 1971
- Recorded: December 8 & 9, 1970; A & R Studios, New York City
- Genre: Post-bop, jazz fusion
- Length: 78:17
- Label: Contemporary; S 7627/8
- Producer: Lester Koenig

Woody Shaw chronology
Jazz Patterns (1970)	Blackstone Legacy (1970)	Song of Songs (1972)

Blackstone Legacy is the debut album by trumpeter Woody Shaw recorded in 1970 and released on the Contemporary label.

Moved by the highly charged political sensibilities among creative artists during the latter part of the 1960s and early 1970s, Shaw's message for Blackstone Legacy spoke to the social and political ills of his time. In the liner notes to Blackstone Legacy, Shaw states:

“This album is dedicated to the youth who will benefit mankind. To the youth who are constantly aware of the turmoil in which the world is and who are trying to right all these wrongs – whether in music or in speech or in any other way of positive work.

This album is dedicated to the freedom of Black people all over the world. And it’s dedicated to the people in the ghettos here. The ‘stone’ in the title is the image of strength. I grew up in a ghetto – funky houses, rats and roaches, stinking hallways. I’ve seen all of that, and I’ve seen people overcome all of that. This music is meant to be a light of hope, a sound of strength and of coming through. It’s one for the ghetto.

We’re trying to express what’s happening in the world today as we – a new breed of young musicians – feel it. I mean the different tensions in the world, the ridiculous war in Vietnam, the oppression of poor people in this, a country of such wealth. The cats on this date usually discuss these things, but we’re all also trying to reach a state of spiritual enlightenment in which we’re continually aware of what’s happening but react in a positive way. The music in this album, you see, expresses strength – confidence that we’ll overcome these things.”

== Background ==
In the liner notes on the original LP release, Shaw told writer Nat Hentoff that the album came about when John Koenig, son of Contemporary Records owner Lester Koenig, saw Shaw playing with Joe Henderson at the Lighthouse Café in late September, 1970, while Henderson was recording his album If You're Not Part of the Solution, You're Part of the Problem. John Koenig encouraged his father to see the Henderson band the following evening, which Lester Koenig did. The label head was impressed by Shaw's playing and offered to record Shaw and give him complete creative control over his backing musicians and music. Shaw, who did not have his own band at the time, recruited two members of the Henderson band who played on If You're Not Part of the Solution, pianist George Cables and drummer Lenny White. To complete the group, Shaw chose three musicians who had worked for Miles Davis in the four years preceding the recording: bassist Ron Carter, and reed players Bennie Maupin and Gary Bartz. Shaw also hired bassist Clint Houston for the sessions, and four of the six tracks on the album feature both Carter and Houston playing bass. Shaw's album was recorded in New York City on December 8–9, about ten weeks after the Henderson band played its Lighthouse Café residency.

== Reception ==
Professional ratings
Review scores
Source	Rating
AllMusic	5/5 stars
The Rolling Stone Jazz Record Guide	4/5 stars
The Penguin Guide to Jazz Recordings	3/4 stars

Michael G. Nastos of AllMusic called the album, "Truly a landmark recording, and a pivot point in the history of post-modern music".

== Track listing ==
All compositions by Woody Shaw except as indicated

1. "Blackstone Legacy" - 16:08
2. "Think On Me" (George Cables) - 10:45
3. "Lost and Found" - 11:57
4. "New World" (Cables) - 18:30
5. "Boo-Ann's Grand" - 14:25
6. "A Deed for Dolphy" - 8:56

== Personnel ==
- Woody Shaw - trumpet
- Gary Bartz - alto saxophone, soprano saxophone
- Bennie Maupin - tenor saxophone, bass clarinet
- George Cables - piano, electric piano
- Ron Carter - bass
- Clint Houston - electric bass
- Lenny White - drums
