= André Jeanquartier =

Swiss pianist

- Born: 1941 (age 84–85); Le Locle, Switzerland
- Occupation: Jazz pianist

André Jeanquartier (born 1941 in Le Locle, Switzerland) is a Swiss jazz pianist.

== Education ==
After finishing school he started to work as teacher in Neuchâtel.

Later, he moved to Graz to study composition and finished his study in 1970 with an honors degree.

== Career ==
He participated on several jazz festivals (Spain, Poland, Hungary, Yugoslavia, India etc.) and won the 1st prize in the jazz festival San Sebastian 1972 and the Music Promotion Prize of the City of Graz 1976.

Since 1983 he worked as teacher at the University of Music and Performing Arts Graz (KUG) and taught improvisation, piano practice and repertoire ensemble for vocalists. Since 2000, he also worked as a painter.

== Personal life ==
In 1975, he got married. He currently has 3 children, a son and two daughters.
