= Judi Singh =

Canadian jazz vocalist (1945–2021)

- Born: May 9, 1945; Edmonton, Alberta, Canada
- Died: July 18, 2021 (aged 76); Victoria, British Columbia, Canada
- Occupations: Singer, musician

Judi Singh (May 9, 1945 – July 18, 2021), sometimes spelled Judy Singh, was a Canadian jazz musician based in Edmonton, Alberta, Canada.

== Early life and family ==
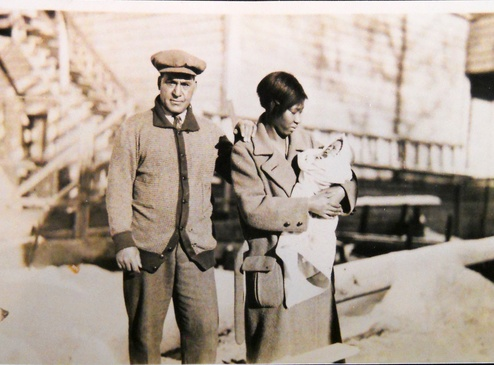
Judi's parents, Effie Jones & Sohan Singh Bhullar, holding her sister Helen in 1928.

Judi was one of seven children born to Sohan Singh Bhullar and Effie Jones. Her father was a Punjabi Sikh who moved to Canada from India in 1907, becoming one of the first Indo-Canadians in Alberta; a park in Edmonton's Mill Woods neighbourhood is named in his honour. Her mother's family were among the earliest Black families to settle in Alberta, helping to found the historic settlement of Amber Valley. South Asian and Black marriages were not uncommon at the time as both groups faced marginalization. Both communities worshipped and socialized together at Edmonton's sole black church, Shiloh Baptist Church.

Singh grew up listening to gospel, blues, jazz, and Indian music in her family home near the University of Alberta campus. Her father played the bansuri, a traditional Indian bamboo flute.

== Singing career and later life ==
Judi Singh began singing at Edmonton's famed Yardbird Suite at the age of 17. She played to sold-out crowds at the venue throughout the 1950s and 1960s.

In the mid-1960s, she moved to Winnipeg to work with the CBC. In Winnipeg, she met her partner Lenny Breau, who was later inducted into the Canadian Music Hall of Fame. They eventually moved to Toronto with hopes of making it big in the city's music scene. However, the relationship disintegrated as Breau was often absent and dealing with addiction issues, leaving Singh to take care of their daughter on her own.

In 1970, Singh moved back to Edmonton with her daughter Emily, and recorded the album A Time for Love with Tommy Banks. Today, this album is considered one of the greatest Canadian vocal jazz records by collectors.

She also contributed vocals to two songs, her own composition, Time Is Right and Victor Lewis’s Why, on Woody Shaw's 1980 album, For Sure!.

She spent her later years living a private life in Victoria, British Columbia, dying on July 18, 2021.

In 2025 she was the subject of Baljit Sangra's documentary film Have You Heard Judi Singh?

== See also ==
- Canadian jazz
- Indo-Canadians
