= Onaje Allan Gumbs =

American pianist, composer, and bandleader (1949–2020)

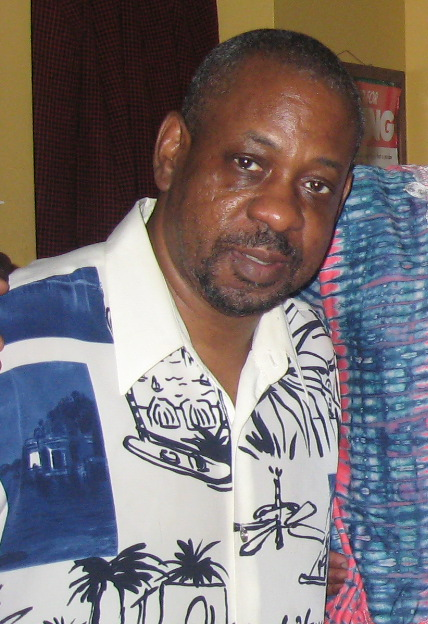
- Allan Gumbs in 2010

Background information
- Born: Allan Bentley Gumbs; September 3, 1949; New York City, US
- Died: April 6, 2020 (aged 70) Yonkers, New York, US
- Genres: Bebop, hard bop, soul jazz, smooth jazz, fusion
- Occupations: Musician, composer, arranger, bandleader, lyricist
- Instrument: Piano
- Years active: 1970s–2020
- Labels: 18th and Vine, Ejano
- Formerly of: Obba Babatundé, Woody Shaw, Nat Adderley, Kenny Burrell, Buster Williams, Stanley Jordan, Angela Bofill, Betty Carter, Grady Tate, Jeffrey Osborne, Deneice Williams, Norman Connors, Sathima Bea Benjamin
- Website: onajeallangumbs.com

Onaje Allan Gumbs (born Allan Bentley Gumbs, September 3, 1949 – April 6, 2020) was a New York–based pianist, composer, and bandleader.

== Early life and career ==
Gumbs was born in Harlem, a neighborhood in New York City, to parents who had immigrated to the United States from the Caribbean. Gumbs' mother was from Montserrat, while his father, a New York City police officer, was from Anguilla. He was the nephew of Hubert Harrison's daughter-in-law. As a child, Gumbs was fascinated by the film and television music of Henry Mancini. Gumbs graduated from the State University of New York at Fredonia, and during his years there was a member of a student-organized jazz ensemble.

In 1971, Leroy Kirkland introduced Gumbs to the Detroit guitarist Kenny Burrell, to whom Onaje gave a demo tape. The following day, Gumbs received a call to play with Burrell at Baker's Keyboard Lounge in Detroit. This work led to further performances with major jazz musicians such as bassist Larry Ridley as well as The Thad Jones/ Mel Lewis Orchestra. During the early 1970s, Gumbs replaced Nat Adderley, Jr. in a contemporary jazz ensemble called Natural Essence, which included during these years Buddy Williams and T. S. Monk (drums and percussion), bassist Alex Blake, and trombonist Earl McIntyre.

Gumbs adopted the name Onaje in the early 1970s; it means "the sensitive one". He met his future wife, Sandra Wright, in 1971 during a short teaching engagement he took in Buffalo, New York. The two wed later in the decade and remained married until Gumbs' death in 2020.

In the late 1970s, Gumbs recorded with Woody Shaw and worked as musical director for R&B singer Phyllis Hyman, Angela Bofill and Jeffrey Osborne. Later in his career he worked extensively with Ronald Shannon Jackson, and in 2013, following Jackson's death, Gumbs recorded a solo piano album consisting of improvisations on Jackson's compositions. Later in his life, he taught at the New School for Jazz and Contemporary Music in Manhattan and the Litchfield Jazz Camp in Connecticut. DownBeat stated that his "association with the New School for Jazz and Contemporary Music in New York and his work with the Litchfield Jazz Camp in New Milford, Conn., allowed him to expand his vision and shape young minds."

== Later life ==
On January 24, 2010, Gumbs suffered a stroke and was hospitalized for two days. In December of that year, he released an album in Japan entitled Just Like Yesterday. On the album, he was accompanied by Omar Hakim, Victor Bailey, Marcus McLaurine, William S. Patterson and Chuggy Carter. Any visible signs of the stroke had since vanished.

In February 2015, he was hospitalized for two weeks, though he was able to recover and return to composing and performance.

Onaje Allan Gumbs died on April 6, 2020, aged 70.

== Legacy ==
In 2022, De Kruif Place in the Bronx was co-named Onaje Allan Gumbs Way.

== Discography ==
=== As leader ===
Year recorded	Title	Label	Personnel/Notes
1976	Onaje	SteepleChase	Solo piano
1980s	Bloodlife: Solo Piano Improvisations Based on the Melodies of Ronald Shannon Jackson	Ejano Music	Solo piano; released around 2014
1988	That Special Part of Me	Zebra Records / MCA Records	
1989?	Dare to Dream	Zebra	With Roger Byam (tenor sax), Jef Lee Johnson and Kevin Eubanks (guitar), Oscar Carataya (bass), Buddy Williams (drums), Steve Thornton (percussion), Gerri Griffin and Dennis Collins (vocals)
2000	Return to Form	Half Note	With Rene McLean (alto sax), Marcus McLaurine (bass), Payton Croslley (drums), Gary Fritz (percussion)
2004	Remember Their Innocence	Ejano Music	With Sadao Watanabe (alto sax)
2006	Sack Full of Dreams	18th & Vine	With Mark Shim (tenor sax), Bob DeVos (guitar), Marcus McLaurine (bass), George Gray (drums), Gary Fritz (percussion), Obba Babatunde (vocals)
2010?	Just Like Yesterday	Pony Canyon	

Main source:

=== As sideman ===
With Nat Adderley

- Don't Look Back (SteepleChase, 1976)
- Hummin' (Little David, 1976)

With T. K. Blue

- Follow the North Star (JaJa, 2008)

With Betty Carter

- The Betty Carter Album (Bet-Car Productions, 1976)

With Norman Connors

- Dark of Light
- Love from the Sun
- Saturday Night Special
- You Are My Starship
- Invitation
- Mr. C
- Eternity

With Carlos Garnett

- Black Love (Muse, 1974)

With Toninho Horta

- Moonstone (Verve Forecast, 1989)
- Foot On The Road (Verve, 1994)

With Ronald Shannon Jackson

- Decode Yourself (Island, 1985)

With Bennie Maupin

- Slow Traffic to the Right
- Moonscapes

With Cecil McBee

- Mutima (Strata-East, 1974)

With Mark Mosley

- TLC (Mark Mosley, 2012)

With Avery Sharpe

- Running Man (JKNM, 2011)
- Sojourner Truth: Ain't I a Woman (JKNM, 2013)

With Woody Shaw

- The Moontrane (Muse, 1974)
- Rosewood (Columbia, 1977)
- Stepping Stones: Live at the Village Vanguard (Columbia, 1978)
- Woody III (Columbia, 1979)

With John Stubblefield

- Prelude (Storyville, 1978)

With Charles Sullivan

- Genesis (Strata-East, 1974)

With Lenny White

- Venusian Summer
- Big City
