= Stafford James =

American double-bassist and composer (born 1946)

Stafford James (born April 24, 1946) is an American double-bassist and composer.

== Biography ==
Stafford James was born in Evanston, Illinois. From ages 6 to 11 he was a left handed violinist in the school orchestra. He also possessed drawing skills, and at 13 he started to work in the atelier of Chicago church architect Barry Byrne as a tracer. By age 16 he started designing desert habitation structures in the Prairie School style with the urging of Mr. Byrne. During the Vietnam War era he enlisted in the U.S. Air Force; after his discharge he studied contrabass at the Chicago Conservatory College with Rudolf Fahsbender of the Chicago Symphony Orchestra. In 1969 he moved to New York City and studied under Julius Levine at the Mannes College of Music. There, in New York, he met Pharoah Sanders, with whom he played his first jazz concerts in New York. James played with Monty Alexander and Sun Ra at the end of the 1960s as well. Soon after he worked with Alice Coltrane and Albert Ayler. He did the first road tour of the Broadway show Hair and toured Canada with them in 1970. In 1971 he met Melba Moore, and played with her as part of the David Frost Revue including Artie Johnson, Diahann Carroll and Fred Travalena. Other performances in the early 1970s included performances with Rashied Ali, Roy Ayers, Al Haig, Barry Harris, Andrew Hill, Andrew Cyrille, and Chico Hamilton.

In 1973 he toured Europe for the first time with Gary Bartz. In 1974, he was a member of Art Blakey's Jazz Messengers. At the same time he met Betty Carter and Woody Shaw. During this period, he started teaching at the United Nations International School in New York City. His first album as a leader in 1975 on the Horo Records label featured Enrico Rava, Dave Burrell and Beaver Harris. In 1976 he founded a quintet, featuring bass, cello, saxophones, drums and percussion which also toured Europe. He met Dexter Gordon there while touring with Al Cohn and recorded his album Homecoming with him upon his return to the United States. He then toured Europe with John Scofield and performed on his album Rough House. In 1978 he recorded his second album as a bandleader, The Stafford James Ensemble, featuring Frank Strozier, Harold Mabern and Louis Hayes.

In the early 1980s James toured Australia, New Zealand, Japan, Mexico, and South America. In 1983 he began collaborating with Jimmy Heath, and did more work with Woody Shaw, including a world tour with the United States Information Service. In 1986, he composed an Ethiopia Suite for two basses, string ensemble, drums and 10 dancers for the Celebrate Brooklyn Dance Festival in a collaboration with choreographer Stephan Koplowitz. That same year, he toured in Canada performing the music of Franz Schubert and then with his return to the United States arranged compositions by Duke Ellington for an trio ensemble consisting of himself, pianist Mulgrew Miller and cellist Akua Dixon. In 1987 he composed Sonatina for viola d'amore and double bass, premiered at Bates Recital Hall at the University of Texas, Austin, Texas and at the European Music Festival in Stuttgart, Germany in 1988. That year he also had a part in an episode of the NBC-TV comedy-drama, The Days and Nights of Molly Dodd starring Blair Brown.

In 1989 James moved to Paris, collaborating with Pharoah Sanders, Barney Wilen and La Velle, after which he formed the Stafford James Project and then studied with Ludwig Streicher in Vienna, Austria. In 1991 he played Igor Stravinsky's The Firebird on tour with the Lviv Philharmonic Orchestra of Lviv, Ukraine, after the fall of the Berlin Wall during Perestroika for their first tour of Western Europe. Flautist Herbie Mann was a guest artist for one of the performances. In 1992 he toured with trumpeter Freddie Hubbard as part of the Freddie Hubbard All-Stars group performing in Rome, Italy, Acireale, Leipzig, Germany, Paris, France and Groningen, Netherlands.

In 1994 Stafford James played in his trio with pianist Onaje Allen Gumbs and drummer Ronnie Burrage. He then composed Les Alpes aux Carpates for solo bass, two pan flutes, string orchestra, women's choir, synthesizers and drums in 1995 and premiered the work in Die, France. In 1998 he toured Belgium, Holland, Germany, Austria, and Italy in a quartet with Buster Williams, Anga Diaz (later Don Alias), and Ronnie Burrage. In that same year he was awarded the Civitella Ranieri Fellowship, Umbertide, Italy, to compose new music for contrabass soloist and orchestra. In 1999 he was invited to Samarkand, Uzbekistan.

In 2001 he recorded his third album, Le Gecko, in co-production with the Westdeutscher Rundfunk radio of Cologne, Germany. The album also features Don Alias and Gene Jackson. During this period there were also recordings with Radio France and Nederlandse Programma Stichting of the Netherlands. In 2005 he re-formed his seven-piece string ensemble consisting of solo bass, rhythmic bass, string quartet and drums with tours in Austria, Germany and France. Also in 2005, the University of Chicago included his compositions into the Regenstein Library. In 2008, his new recording The Stafford James String Ensemble was released by Staja Music, featuring Ralph Morrison, Sara Parkins, Jennie Hansen, Wolf Sebastian and Douglas Sides.

In 2009, James taught master classes at the University of Graz, Graz, Austria, Bruckner University, Linz, Austria, Roosevelt University, Chicago, and tours with members of the Bruckner Orchestra Linz, Austria and concerts in the United States. In 2010, the Chicago-based WFMT Radio Network, which is the official radio station of both the Chicago Symphony Orchestra and the New York Philharmonic, did a two-hour program on his life and compositions, entitled Composing for the Contrabass. In 2011, James became founder and president of Top Hat Music Society, Inc., a dinner/concert music series including Jazz, Classical, Operetta and Cabaret with international artists. Also in 2011, Stafford's composition "That's what dreams are made of" was utilized in the French television series Le Grand Restaurant (TV show) by Pierre Palmade.

In 2012, The Stafford James String Ensemble recorded a new album, Round About Midnight, "live" in Chicago. Also in that same year he married Gunda Hennig of Bremen, Germany. They were married in Las Vegas, Nevada, where he had worked with Melba Moore.

In 2013, the Stafford James String and Percussion Ensemble with special guest M'Boom (the percussion ensemble of Max Roach), performed at the Chicago Jazz Festival's Pritzker Pavilion in Millennium Park. Musicians included: Richard Davis, Ray Mantilla, Warren Smith, Ely Fountain, Geraldo de Oliveira, Geof Bradfield, Scott Hesse, String Quartet with Carol Lahti, Becky Coffman, Vannia Phillips, Andrew Snow and Stafford James as soloist.

In 2015, the Stafford James Strings, Percussion and Horns Ensemble toured Europe, performing original compositions in tandem with compositions by other Jazz composers. The arrangements by Stafford James featured contrabass soloist, harp, string quartet, flute, trumpet doubling on flugelhorn, saxes doubling on bass clarinet, trombone, tuba, guitar, support bass, drums and percussion. The presentation is that of a double bass concerto.

2016-17 there was a new series of three productions in Chicago of the Stafford James Strings, Percussion and Horns Ensemble, a string quartet and a string quintet at the EDGE Theater located in Edgewater, Chicago. The series was produced by Top Hat Music Society. The first Strings, Percussion and Horns Ensemble concert (December 8, 2016) was recorded live by Eric Arunas of the WFMT Radio Network. This was then followed with a masterclass and performance 2017 at the University of Wisconsin-Madison and a European tour.

2019 Roxxon Records & Tapes of Hannover, Germany releases the Stafford James String Ensemble "Live" recorded in both Zürich and Chicago.

== Discography ==
=== As leader ===
- Stafford James (Horo, 1976)
- Stafford James Ensemble (Red, 1979)
- Le Gecko (WDR, 2001)
- A Song for Our Heroes (Staja, 2008)
- Round About Midnight (Staja, 2012)
- Stafford James String Ensemble "Live" (Roxxon Records & Tapes, 2019)

=== As sideman ===
With Albert Ayler

- Music Is the Healing Force of the Universe (Impulse!, 1970)
- The Last Album (Impulse!, 1971)

With Gary Bartz

- Juju Street Songs (Prestige, 1972)
- I've Known Rivers (Prestige, 1973)

With Louis Hayes

- Ichi-Ban (Timeless, 1976) with Junior Cook
- The Real Thing (Muse, 1977)

With Pharoah Sanders

- Moon Child (Timeless, 1990)
- Welcome to Love (Timeless, 1991)

With Woody Shaw

- Little Red's Fantasy (Muse, 1976)
- The Woody Shaw Concert Ensemble at the Berliner Jazztage (Muse, 1976)
- For Sure! (Columbia, 1979)
- United (Columbia, 1981)
- Lotus Flower (Enja, 1982)
- Master of the Art (Elektra Music, 1982)
- Night Music (Elektra, 1982)

With others

- Rashied Ali, New Directions in Modern Music (Survival, 1973)
- Andrew Cyrille, Celebration (IPS, 1975)
- Kenny Gill, What Was What Is What Will Be (Raccoon, 1970)
- Dexter Gordon, Homecoming (Columbia, 1976)
- Bill Hardman, Focus (Muse, 1980 [1984])
- Jimmy Heath, Peer Pleasure (Landmark, 1987)
- LaVelle, Tribute to Nat "King" Cole (OMD Records, 1990)
- Oliver Lake, Heavy Spirits (Arista Freedom, 1975)
- Frank Strozier, What's Goin On (Steeplechase, 1978)
- Ronnie Mathews, Selena's Dance (Timeless, 1988)
- Cecil Payne, Casbah (Empathy, 1986)
- Roswell Rudd, Inside Job (Arista/Freedom, 1976)
