= Woody Shaw =

American jazz trumpeter, composer, bandleader, and educator (1945–1989)

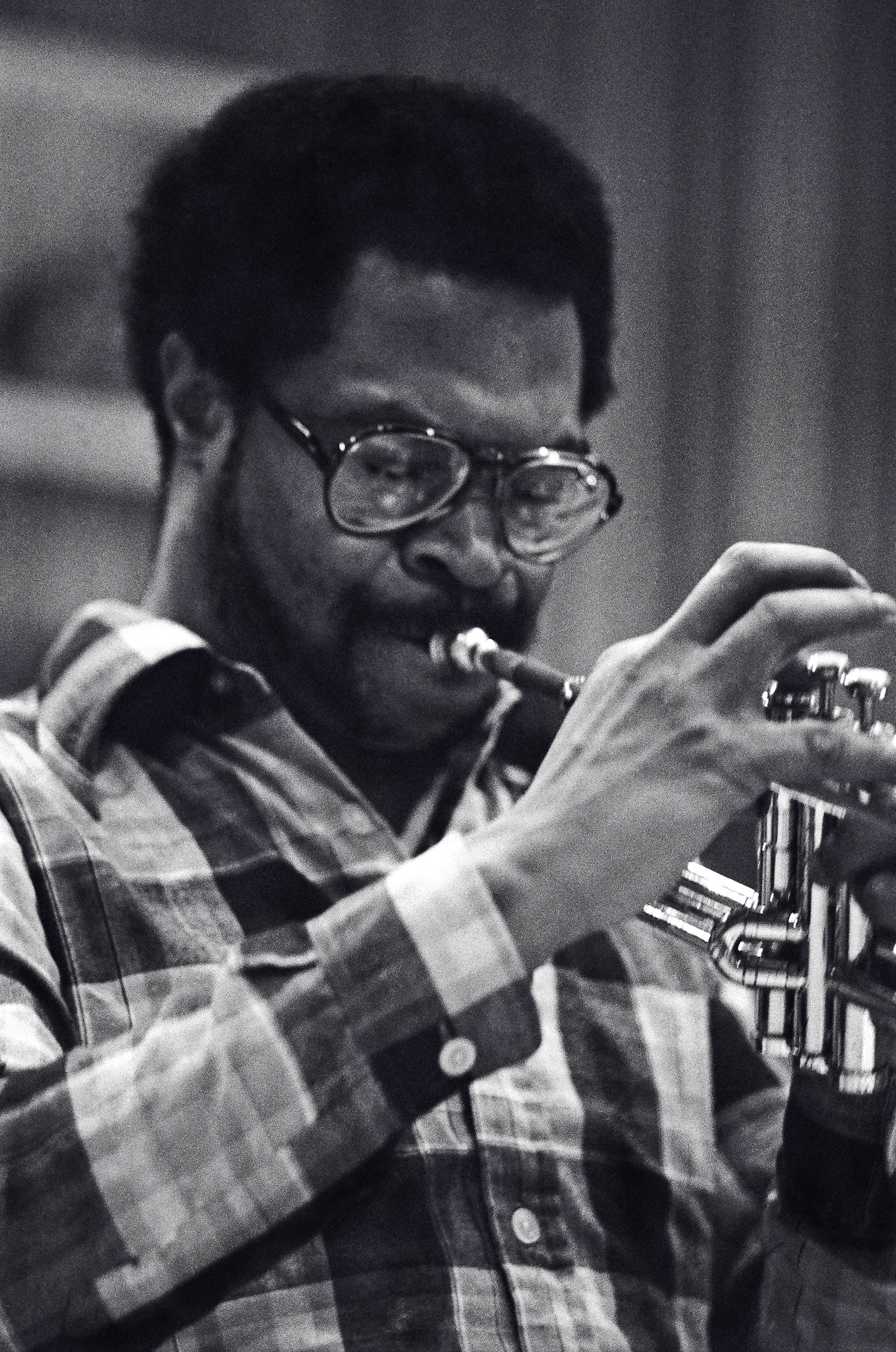
- Shaw, c. 1978

Background information
- Born: Woody Herman Shaw Jr. December 24, 1944; Laurinburg, North Carolina, United States
- Origin: Newark, New Jersey, United States
- Died: May 10, 1989 (aged 44) Manhattan, New York City, United States
- Genres: Jazz; bebop; hard bop; post-bop; modal jazz; avant-garde jazz
- Occupations: Musician; bandleader; composer; educator
- Instruments: Trumpet; flugelhorn; cornet
- Years active: 1963–1989
- Labels: Columbia; Muse; Elektra; Blue Note; Fantasy; Contemporary; Concord
- Formerly of: Willie Bobo; Eric Dolphy; Horace Silver quintet; The Jazz Messengers
- Website: woodyshaw.com

Woody Herman Shaw Jr. (December 24, 1944 – May 10, 1989) was an American jazz trumpeter, flugelhornist, cornetist, composer, arranger, bandleader, and educator. He is widely known as one of the 20th century's most important and influential jazz trumpeters and composers. He is often credited with revolutionizing the technical and harmonic language of modern jazz trumpet playing and is regarded by many as one of the major innovators of the instrument. He was an acclaimed virtuoso, mentor, and spokesperson for jazz and worked and recorded alongside many of the leading musicians of his time.

== Early life and background ==
Woody Shaw was born in Laurinburg, North Carolina. At one year old, he moved to Newark, New Jersey, with his parents, Rosalie Pegues and Woody Shaw Sr. His father was a member of the African American gospel group the Diamond Jubilee Singers. Both parents attended Laurinburg Institute, the same secondary private school as Dizzy Gillespie. Shaw's mother and Gillespie were both from the same town, Cheraw, South Carolina.

Shaw began playing the bugle at age nine and performed in the Newark Junior Elks, Junior Mason, and the Washington Carver Drum and Bugle Corps. Though not his first choice of instrument, he began studying classical trumpet with Jerome Ziering at Cleveland Junior High School at the age of 11.

In a 1978 interview, Shaw explained:

The trumpet was not my first choice for an instrument. In fact, I ended up playing it by default. When we were asked what we wanted to play in the Eighteenth Avenue School Band, I chose the violin, but I was too late since all the violins were taken. My second choice was the saxophone or the trombone but they were also all spoken for. The only instrument that was left was the trumpet, and I felt why did I have to get stuck with this "tinny" sounding thing.

When I complained to my music teacher that I didn't think it was fair that all the other kids got to play the instruments they wanted, he told me to just be patient. He said he had a good feeling about me and the trumpet, and he assured me I'd grow to love it. Of course my teacher was right, and it didn't take long for me to fall in love with the trumpet. In retrospect, I believe there was some mystical force that brought us together.

Ziering encouraged him to continue his study of classical trumpet playing and pursue an education at the Juilliard School of music with trumpet instructor William Vacchiano; however, Shaw had a deep interest in jazz. His first influences were Louis Armstrong and Harry James. After skipping two grades, he began attending Newark Arts High School (the alma mater of Wayne Shorter, Sarah Vaughan, Melba Moore, Savion Glover, Larry Young, and many others), from which he graduated.

As a teenager, Shaw worked professionally at weddings, dances, and night clubs. He eventually left school but continued his study of the trumpet under the influence of Gillespie, Fats Navarro, Clifford Brown, Booker Little, Lee Morgan, and Freddie Hubbard. He later discovered that he had picked up the trumpet during the same month and year that Brown died: June 1956.

== Career ==
=== Paris and Eric Dolphy (early 1960s) ===
In 1963, after many local professional jobs, Shaw worked for Willie Bobo (with Chick Corea and Joe Farrell), and performed and recorded as a sideman with Eric Dolphy, with whom he made his recorded debut, Iron Man. Dolphy, who was living in Paris, unexpectedly died in June 1964. Shaw was nonetheless invited to Paris to join Dolphy's colleague, Nathan Davis, and the two men found steady work all over Europe. While living in Paris, they frequented the club Le Chat Qui Pêche, and Shaw crossed paths with musicians such as Bud Powell, Kenny Clarke, Johnny Griffin, Dexter Gordon, Art Taylor, other lesser-known musicians such as John Bodwin, and French musicians including Jean-Louis Chautemps, René Urtreger, Jacques Thollot, and Jef Gilson. After some time, Shaw demanded that two of his contemporaries, organist Larry Young and drummer Billy Brooks, be relocated to Paris. The four young musicians – Davis, Shaw, Young, and Brooks – continued living and performing in France, intermittently touring cities in Europe, including Berlin, Germany.

=== Blue Note Records (mid-to-late 1960s) ===
By the mid-1960s, Shaw had successfully absorbed the concepts and influence of his mentor and friend, saxophonist Dolphy, and was meanwhile exploring the harmonic innovations of saxophonist John Coltrane and pianist McCoy Tyner. Both musicians contributed greatly to the development of Shaw's style as a trumpeter and composer.

Shaw returned to the U.S. from Paris in 1965 and began his career as one of Blue Note Records' regular trumpet players, working steadily with their roster of artists. He replaced Carmell Jones in the Horace Silver quintet (1965–66) and made his Blue Note debut on Silver's The Cape Verdean Blues, followed by Larry Young's Unity (1965); the album with Young featured three of his compositions ("Zoltan", "Moontrane", and "Beyond All Limits"). "Moontrane", dedicated to Coltrane, was written when Shaw was 18 years old and was his earliest composition.

Shaw also collaborated frequently and recorded with Chick Corea (1966–67, 1969), Jackie McLean (1967), Booker Ervin (1968), Tyner (1968), Andrew Hill (1969), Herbie Hancock, and Bobby Hutcherson. In 1968–69, he worked intermittently with Max Roach, touring with him in Iran. Shaw also worked as a studio musician, in pit orchestras, and for Broadway musicals.

=== Contemporary and Muse (early-to-mid 1970s) ===
In 1970, Shaw recorded his first album as a leader, Blackstone Legacy, for Contemporary Records. It featured Bennie Maupin, Ron Carter, George Cables, Gary Bartz, Clint Houston, and Lenny White. This was followed by a second release under Shaw's name, entitled Song of Songs. During this time, Shaw moved to San Francisco to explore new opportunities and became closely associated with musicians on the West Coast such as Bobby Hutcherson, Eddie Moore, Eddie Marshall, and Henry Franklin.

In 1974, Shaw returned from California to New York, beginning an association with Muse Records, recording the albums The Moontrane, Love Dance, Little Red's Fantasy, and Iron Men, with musicians from the mid-western creative black arts scene such as Anthony Braxton, Arthur Blythe, and Muhal Richard Abrams.

=== Columbia Records (late 1970s) ===
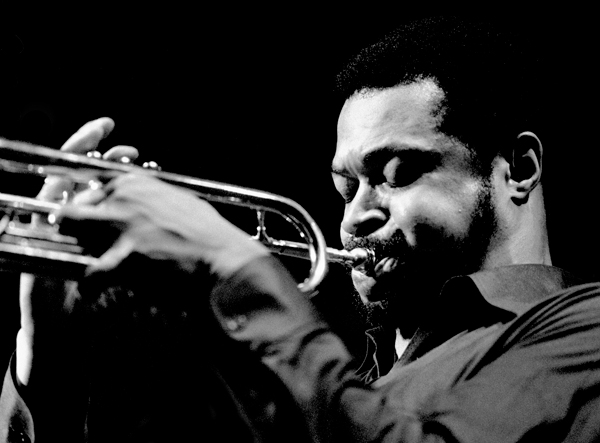
Shaw in 1979

After working frequently with Hutcherson, Art Blakey, Tyner, and others, Shaw emerged as a bandleader during the early 1970s, a time when many jazz artists began to explore jazz rock. A younger statesman among his elders, Shaw saw himself as an heir to the musical legacy of trumpeters such as Gillespie, Navarro, and Brown, and, being an alumnus of Blakey's Jazz Messengers, felt responsible for upholding the integrity and appreciation of the tradition.

After releasing several albums for the Muse label, Shaw signed to Columbia Records in 1977 following an endorsement from Miles Davis. He then recorded the albums Rosewood, Stepping Stones: Live at the Village Vanguard, Woody III, For Sure!, and United.

Rosewood was nominated for two Grammys and was voted Best Jazz Album of 1978 in the DownBeat Readers' Poll, which also voted Shaw Best Jazz Trumpeter of the Year and No. 4 Jazz Musician of the Year.

=== 1980s ===
Throughout the 1980s, Shaw continued performing and recording as a leader with sidemen such as pianists Onaje Allan Gumbs, Mulgrew Miller, and Larry Willis, bassist David Williams, drummer Terri Lyne Carrington, and trombonist Steve Turre, recording a number of more "traditional" but highly lyrical albums (Solid, Setting Standards, In My Own Sweet Way) consisting mainly of standards and tunes from the hard bop repertoire. During this time he also worked on projects with saxophonists Benny Golson, Kenny Garrett, and Dexter Gordon, as well as fellow trumpeter Freddie Hubbard on three albums (Double Take, and The Eternal Triangle, reissued on Blue Note as The Freddie Hubbard and Woody Shaw Sessions) and Golson's Time Speaks.

During a 1980s tour for the United States Information Service, Shaw ventured to such countries as Egypt, Sudan, and the United Arab Emirates. Recently, it has been discovered that Shaw spent significant time performing and giving clinics in India, working in cities such as New Delhi, Bombay, Bangalore, and Calcutta. When asked by film producer Chuck France in an interview whether he thought traveling was important, Shaw responded, "Most definitely. I think every great artist should share his music with the world."

=== Health issues and death ===
By the late 1980s, Shaw was nearly blind from retinitis pigmentosa, an incurable degenerative eye disease. A heroin user throughout his adult life, Shaw was in poor health when he returned to the U.S. in early 1989 from a lengthy stay in Europe and needed a wheelchair at the airport. On the morning of February 27, 1989, he was struck by a subway car in Brooklyn, New York, which mangled his left arm and caused other injuries including head trauma; doctors were forced to amputate his arm. The night before the accident, Max Roach sent a limousine to Newark where Shaw was staying, to bring him to the Village Vanguard to hear Roach play. After the set, Roach put Shaw into a taxi around midnight with enough money to get back to Newark. Shaw did not go to Newark; it is unclear what led to the accident later that morning. During his hospital stay at Bellevue, Shaw suffered kidney failure, was put on a respirator, and lost consciousness for over a month. He died from kidney failure on May 10, 1989, aged 44.

== Educational work ==
Throughout his career, Shaw gave clinics, master classes, and private lessons to students around the world. During the 1970s, he and Joe Henderson were faculty members in Jamey Aebersold's jazz camp. NEA Grant recipients who studied with Shaw include Wynton Marsalis (musical director of Jazz at Lincoln Center) and Ingrid Monson (Quincy Jones Professor of African American Music, Harvard University). Other students and apprentices include Chris Botti, Wallace Roney, and Terence Blanchard.

== Awards ==
- Talent Deserving Wider Recognition, Downbeat International Jazz Critics' Poll (1977)
- Jazz Album of the Year, Downbeat Readers' Poll: Rosewood (Columbia, 1978)
- Best Trumpeter, Downbeat Readers' Poll (1978)
- Grammy Award nomination – Best Jazz Instrumental Performance, Soloist: Rosewood (1979)
- Grammy Award nomination – Best Jazz Instrumental Performance, Group: Woody Shaw Concert Ensemble, Rosewood (1979)
- Best Trumpeter, Downbeat Readers' Poll (1980)
- Downbeat Hall of Fame (1989)

== Image and legacy ==
The years between 2003 and 2013 saw a resurgence of interest in, and recognition of, Shaw's music. In 2003, Shaw's son, Woody Louis Armstrong Shaw III, launched the Official Woody Shaw Website. Since then, many of Shaw's long-out-of-print recordings have been reissued, remastered, and repackaged, under the curatorial oversight of Shaw's son and the long-time producer Michael Cuscuna.

In 2012, PopMarket, a division of Sony Legacy, released Woody Shaw: The Complete Columbia Albums Collection, and in 2013, Mosaic Records released Woody Shaw: The Complete Muse Sessions, for which NPR described Shaw as "the last great trumpet innovator".

Shaw III, the primary inspiration for Shaw's third Columbia album, Woody III (dedicated to Shaw's father and newborn son), is the sole heir to his father's legacy. Today, Shaw III preserves the Shaw legacy through the production, management, archiving and preservation of his father's life's work. Shaw's legacy is kept active and relevant through the use of social media and the official website.

=== Relationship with other musicians ===
As a musician and trumpeter, Shaw was held in high esteem by his colleagues. Miles Davis once said of Shaw, "Now there's a great trumpet player. He can play different from all of them." Trumpeter Dave Douglas stated, "It's not only the brilliant imagination that captivates with Woody Shaw – it's how natural those fiendishly difficult lines feel ... Woody Shaw is now one of the most revered figures for trumpeters today."

Shaw is credited with having extended the harmonic and technical vocabulary of the trumpet. Upon hearing of Shaw's death in 1989, Wynton Marsalis stated, "Woody added to the vocabulary of the trumpet. His whole approach influenced me tremendously." Multi-genre producer, DJ, and rapper Madlib also cites Shaw as an inspiration. In an interview with Red Bull Music Academy, Madlib listed Shaw as his favorite trumpet player, saying of his music, "It's electric and acoustic, traditional and non-traditional — that's what I'm all about."

== Style and influences ==
Shaw was noted for his mastery and innovative use of "wide" intervals, often fourths and fifths, which are considered relatively unnatural to the trumpet and difficult to employ skillfully due to (a) the technical facility required to do so, (b) the architecture of the instrument, (c) the trumpet's inherent harmonic tendencies based on the overtone series, and (d) its traditional association with intervals based more commonly on thirds and diatonic relationships.

In both his improvisations and his compositions, Shaw frequently used polytonality, the combination of two or more tonalities or keys (i.e., multiple chords or harmonic structures) at once. In his solos, he often superimposed highly complex permutations of the pentatonic scale and sequences of intervals that modulated unpredictably through numerous key centers. He was a master of modality and used a wide range of harmonic color, generating unusual contrasts, using tension and resolution, dissonance, odd rhythmic groupings, and "over the barline" phrases, yet always resolving his ideas according to the form and harmonic structure of a given composition while adhering to the conventions of jazz improvisation and simultaneously creating new ones.

His "attack" was remarkably clean and precise, regardless of tempo (Shaw often played extremely fast passages). He had a rich, dark tone that was distinctive with a near-vocal quality to it; his intonation and articulation were highly developed, and he greatly utilized the effects of the lower register, usually employing a deep, extended vibrato at the end of his phrases. Shaw also often incorporated the chromatic scale, which gave his melodic lines a subtle fluidity that seemed to allow him to weave "in and out" of chords seamlessly from all "angles".

Shaw was also born with an extraordinary memory and perfect pitch. Max Roach once stated, "He was truly one of the greatest. I first had occasion to work with Woody on a trip to Iran. One of the most amazing things was his uncanny memory. I was just flabbergasted. After one look, he knew all of the charts, no matter how complex they were."

Shaw's improvisational and composing style bears the influences of his idols Dolphy, Coltrane, and Tyner, as well as many European modern classical and 20th-century composers, such as Béla Bartók, Zoltán Kodály, Arnold Schoenberg, Alban Berg, Anton Webern, Erik Satie, Alexander Scriabin, Carlos Chávez, Ernest Bloch, Olivier Messiaen, Paul Hindemith, Charles Ives, Edgard Varèse, Igor Stravinsky, Claude Debussy, Maurice Ravel, and Colin McPhee. Shaw also listened closely to traditional Japanese music, Indonesian Gamelan, Indian classical music, Brazilian music, and various other musics of the world.

== Discography ==
=== As leader/co-leader ===
- 1965: In the Beginning (Muse, 1983)
- 1970: Jazz Patterns (Everest, 1982)
- 1970: Blackstone Legacy (Contemporary, 1971)
- 1972: Song of Songs (Contemporary, 1973)
- 1974: The Moontrane (Muse, 1975)
- 1975: San Francisco Express – Getting It Together (Reynolds, 1979)
- 1975: Love Dance (Muse, 1976)
- 1976: Little Red's Fantasy (Muse, 1978)
- 1976: The Woody Shaw Concert Ensemble at the Berliner Jazztage (Muse, 1977) – live
- 1977: Lausanne 1977 with Louis Hayes (TCB, 1977) – live
- 1977: The Iron Men with Anthony Braxton (Muse, 1980)
- 1977: Woody Shaw Live Volume One (HighNote, 2000) – live
- 1977: Woody Shaw Live Volume Two (HighNote, 2001) – live
- 1977: Woody Shaw Live Volume Three (HighNote, 2002) – live
- 1977: Rosewood (Columbia, 1978)
- 1978: Stepping Stones: Live at the Village Vanguard (Columbia, 1979) – live
- 1978–79: Woody III (Columbia, 1979)
- 1979: At Onkel Pö's Carnegie Hall Hamburg 1979 Vol. 1 (Jazzline, 2019)
- 1979: For Sure! (Columbia, 1980)
- 1981: United (Columbia, 1981)
- 1981: Tokyo '81 (Elemental Music, 2018) – live
- 1981: Woody Shaw Live Volume Four (HighNote, 2005) – live
- 1982: Lotus Flower (Enja, 1982)
- 1982: Master of the Art (Elektra/Musician, 1982) – live
- 1982: Night Music (Elektra/Musician, 1983) – live
- 1983: The Time Is Right (Red, 1983) – live
- 1983: Setting Standards (Muse, 1984)
- 1983: Live in Bremen 1983 (Elemental Music, 2018) – live
- 1985: Woody Shaw with the Tone Jansa Quartet (Timeless, 1985)
- 1985: Double Take with Freddie Hubbard (Blue Note, 1985)
- 1986: Bemsha Swing (Blue Note, 1997)
- 1986: Solid (Muse, 1987)
- 1986: Dr. Chi with the Tone Janša Quartet (Timeless, 1989)
- 1986: 2 MFs – Live at the Closet 1986 with Gary Bartz (Bandcamp, 2020)[digital download] – live
- 1987: In My Own Sweet Way (In + Out, 1989) – live
- 1987: The Eternal Triangle with Freddie Hubbard (Blue Note, 1987)
- 1987: Imagination (Muse, 1988)

Compilations

- Woody Plays Woody (HighNote, 2012) – compilation drawn from the HighNote live albums above
- Field Recordings of a Jazz Master (International Trumpet Guild, 2012)

Box sets

- The Complete CBS Studio Recordings of Woody Shaw (Mosaic, 1992)
- Woody Shaw: The Complete Columbia Albums Collection (Columbia Legacy, 2011)
- Woody Shaw: The Complete Muse Sessions (Mosaic, 2013)

=== As sideman ===
With Art Blakey

- Child's Dance (Prestige, 1972)
- Buhaina (Prestige, 1973)
- Anthenagin (Prestige, 1973)

With Roy Brooks

- The Free Slave (Muse, 1972) – rec.1970
- Duet in Detroit (Enja, 1983)

With Chick Corea

- Tones for Joan's Bones (Atlantic/Vortex, 1966)
- The Complete "Is" Sessions (Solid State,1969)

With Nathan Davis

- Peace Treaty (SFP, 1965)
- Happy Girl (Polydor, 1965)

With Eric Dolphy

- Conversations (Douglas, 1963)
- Iron Man (Douglas, 1963)

With Dexter Gordon

- Homecoming: Live at the Village Vanguard (Columbia, 1976) – live
- Sophisticated Giant (Columbia, 1977)
- Gotham City (Columbia, 1981) – rec. 1980

With George Gruntz

- For Flying Out Proud (MPS, 1977)
- GG-CJB (MPS, 1979)

With Louis Hayes

- Ichi-Ban with Junior Cook (Timeless, 1976)
- The Real Thing (Muse, 1977)

With Joe Henderson

- If You're Not Part of the Solution, You're Part of the Problem (Milestone, 1970) – rereleased as Joe Henderson Quintet at the Lighthouse

With Andrew Hill

- Grass Roots (Blue Note, 1968)
- Lift Every Voice (Blue Note, 1970)
- Passing Ships (Blue Note, 2003) – rec. 1969

With Bobby Hutcherson

- Bobby Hutcherson Live at Montreux (Blue Note, 1973)
- Cirrus (Blue Note, 1974)

With Jackie McLean

- 'Bout Soul (Blue Note, 1969) – rec. 1967
- Demon's Dance (Blue Note, 1970) – rec. 1967

With Hank Mobley

- Reach Out! (Blue Note, 1968)
- Thinking of Home (Blue Note, 1970)

With Horace Silver

- The Cape Verdean Blues (Blue Note, 1965)
- The Jody Grind (Blue Note, 1966)

With Buddy Terry

- Natural Soul (Prestige, 1968)
- Pure Dynamite (Mainstream, 1972)

With Mal Waldron

- The Git Go – Live at the Village Vanguard (Soul Note, 1987) – live; rec. 1986
- The Seagulls of Kristiansund (Soul Note, 1987) – live; rec. 1986

With others

- Gary Bartz, Home! (Milestone, 1970) – rec. 1969
- Black Renaissance, Body, Mind and Spirit (Baystate, 1977) – rec. 1976
- Walter Bishop Jr., Coral Keys (Black Jazz, 1971)
- Joe Chambers, The Almoravid (Muse, 1974)
- Stanley Cowell, Brilliant Circles (Freedom, 1972)
- Booker Ervin, Tex Book Tenor (Blue Note, 2005) – rec. 1968; released in 1976 as part of Back from the Gig
- Sonny Fortune, Serengeti Minstral (Atlantic, 1977)
- Kenny Garrett, Introducing Kenny Garrett (Criss Cross Jazz, 1984)
- Benny Golson, Time Speaks (Baystate, 1982) – also with Freddie Hubbard
- Lionel Hampton, Music of Charles Mingus (Philips, 1977)
- Azar Lawrence, Bridge into the New Age (Prestige, 1974)
- Pharoah Sanders, Deaf Dumb Blind (Summun Bukmun Umyun) (Impulse!, 1970)
- Neil Swainson, 49th Parallel (Concord, 1989) – rec. 1987
- McCoy Tyner, Expansions (Blue Note, 1968)
- Carlos Ward, Lito (Leo Records, 1989) – rec. 1988
- Tyrone Washington, Natural Essence (Blue Note, 1967)
- Buster Williams, Pinnacle (Muse, 1975)
- Larry Young, Unity (Blue Note, 1965)
- Joe Zawinul, Zawinul (Columbia, 1970)
