= G.T. Hogan =

American jazz musician

Granville Theadore Hogan Jr. (January 16, 1929 – August 7, 2004), known professionally as G. T. Hogan, was an American jazz drummer. He is often confused with Wilbert Hogan, who was also an American jazz drummer.

== Biography ==
Born in Galveston, Texas, Hogan played saxophone in high school and then switched to drums. He played with Earl Bostic from 1953 to 1955, before moving to New York City. Over the course of his career he played with Randy Weston, Kenny Drew, Kenny Dorham, Ray Charles, Elmo Hope, Bud Powell and Walter Bishop Jr. He was less active as a musician after the 1970s, and suffered from emphysema in the 1990s. Hogan died on August 7, 2004, in San Antonio, Texas.

== Discography ==
With Walter Bishop Jr.

- Speak Low (Jazztimes, 1961)
- The Walter Bishop Jr. Trio / 1965 (Prestige, 1962 [1965])

With Earl Coleman

- Earl Coleman Returns (Prestige, 1956)

With Hank Crawford

- After Hours (Atlantic, 1966)
- Mr. Blues (Atlantic, 1967)
- Double Cross (Atlantic, 1968)

With Kenny Drew

- This Is New (Riverside, 1957)

With Kenny Dorham

- 2 Horns / 2 Rhythm (Riverside, 1957)
- This Is the Moment! (Riverside, 1958)

With Curtis Fuller

- Soul Trombone (Impulse, 1961)

With Wilbur Harden

- The King and I (Savoy, 1958)

With Ernie Henry

- Last Chorus (Riverside, 1956–57)

With Fred Jackson

- Hootin' 'n Tootin' (Blue Note, 1962)

With Elmo Hope

- High Hope! (Beacon, 1961)

With Cal Massey

- Blues to Coltrane (Candid, 1961 [1987])

With Leo Parker

- Rollin' with Leo (Blue Note, 1961)

With Ike Quebec

- The Complete Blue Note 45 Sessions (Blue Note, 1962)

With A. K. Salim

- Blues Suite (Savoy, 1958)

With Randy Weston

- Get Happy with the Randy Weston Trio (Riverside, 1955)
- With These Hands... (Riverside, 1956)
- The Modern Art of Jazz by Randy Weston (Dawn, 1956)
- New Faces at Newport (MetroJazz, 1958)
- Uhuru Afrika (Roulette, 1960)
