= Recorda Me =

Composition by Joe Henderson

from the album Page One
- Released: 1963
- Recorded: June 3, 1963
- Genre: Jazz, hard bop, Bossa Nova
- Length: 6:03
- Label: Blue Note
- Composer: Joe Henderson
- Producer: Alfred Lion

Page One track listing
- 1. "Blue Bossa"; 2. "La Mesha"; 3. "Homestretch"; 4. "Recorda Me"; 5. "Jinrikisha"; 6. "Out of the Night"

"Recorda Me" ("Remember Me" in Portuguese) is a jazz standard by the saxophonist Joe Henderson. It was introduced on Henderson's debut album Page One, in 1963. This album also featured the first recording of the jazz standard "Blue Bossa", written by trumpeter Kenny Dorham. English lyrics were later written by vocalist Kelley Johnson under the title "Remember Me".

== History ==
Henderson wrote the composition at the age of 15 in a Latin style but later modified it with a bossa nova rhythm. It was recorded by Henderson on subsequent albums, including an uptempo version named "Não Me Esqueça"—"Do Not Forget Me" in Portuguese—on In Pursuit of Blackness and an arrangement named "Recuérdame" (Spanish) on the Big Band album. He recorded live versions on Joe Henderson Quintet at the Lighthouse and in the 1985 film and recording One Night with Blue Note with Freddie Hubbard, Herbie Hancock, Ron Carter and Tony Williams. The composition is used widely in jazz education programs and jazz songbook compilations.

== Musical composition ==
Recorda Me is a 16-bar AB form written as a bossa nova.

‖: A–7      |   %   |   %   |   %   |
|  C–7     |   %   |   %   | C-7 F7  ‖ 
|  B♭maj7   | B♭–7  E♭7  | A♭maj7        | A♭-7  D♭7  |
|  G♭maj7   | G-7   C7   | Fmaj7   E7♭9  | E7♭9       :‖

== Other versions ==
"Recorda Me" has been covered by many other musicians including:

- Steps Ahead on Smokin' in the Pit (1980)
- McCoy Tyner on New York Reunion (1991)
- Art Farmer on Soul Eyes (1991)
- Greg Osby on New Directions (1991)
- Kelley Johnson on Make Someone Happy (1998)
- Tierney Sutton on Unsung Heroes (2000)
- Renee Rosnes on Black Narcissus: A Tribute to Joe Henderson (2008)
- Brownman Electryc Trio on Gravitation (2013) - National Jazz Award winner
- Chick Corea Trio on Trilogy (2013)
- Conrad Herwig on The Latin Side of Joe Henderson (2014)
  - Nominated at the 57th Annual Grammy Awards
- Shaun Martin Three-O on Focus (2018)

== See also ==
- List of post-1950 jazz standards
