= This Is the Moment (disambiguation) =

"This Is the Moment" is a song from the 1990 musical Jekyll & Hyde.

This Is the Moment may also refer to:

- "This Is the Moment", a song by Friedrich Hollaender and Leo Robin from the 1948 film That Lady in Ermine
- This Is the Moment!, a 1958 album by jazz trumpeter Kenny Dorham
- This Is the Moment, a 2001 album by Donny Osmond
- This Is the Moment (album), a 2004 album by Erik Santos
- This Is the Moment – Live 2015-2019, a 2021 live album by Baby Chaos
