= Earl Coleman =

Earl Coleman may refer to:

- Tom Coleman (Missouri politician) (Earl Thomas Coleman, born 1943), U.S. congressman
- Earl Coleman (singer) (1925–1995), jazz singer
