= Earl Coleman Returns =

Studio album by Earl Coleman
- Released: 1956
- Recorded: February 8 & November 4, 1955, March 2 & June 8, 1956
- Studio: Van Gelder Studio, Hackensack, New Jersey
- Genre: Jazz
- Length: 45:29 CD reissue with additional tracks
- Label: Prestige; PR 7045
- Producer: Bob Weinstock

Earl Coleman chronology
Earl Coleman Returns (1956)	Love Songs (1968)

Earl Coleman Returns is an album by American jazz singer Earl Coleman recorded in 1956 and released on the Prestige label. The 1994 CD reissue added four additional tracks originally released on 78 RPM singles.

== Reception ==
Professional ratings
Review scores
Source	Rating
Allmusic	4/5 stars

Allmusic awarded the album 4 stars and reviewer Scott Yanow stated, "Although not an improviser, Coleman could swing, as he shows on these performances with the assistance of such fine players as trumpeter Art Farmer, altoist Gigi Gryce, and pianist Hank Jones".

== Track listing ==
1. "Say It Isn't So" (Irving Berlin) – 5:38
2. "Reminiscing" (Gigi Gryce, Jon Hendricks) – 5:50
3. "Social Call" (Gryce, Hendricks) – 6:29
4. "It's You or No One" (Jule Styne, Sammy Cahn) – 5:19
5. "Come Rain or Come Shine" (Harold Arlen, Johnny Mercer) – 4:15
6. "No Love, No Nothin'" (Harry Warren, Leo Robin) – 5:21
7. "This Is Always" (Warren, Mack Gordon) – 2:40 Additional track on CD reissue
8. "My Last Affair" (Haven Johnson) – 2:47 Additional track on CD reissue
9. "Ghost of a Chance" (Victor Young, Ned Washington, Victor Young) – 3:36 Additional track on CD reissue
10. "I Haven't Changed a Thing" (Henry Nemo, Michael Goldsen, Irving Mills) – 3:34 Additional track on CD reissue
- Recorded at Van Gelder Studio on February 8, 1955 (tracks 7 & 8), November 4, 1955 (tracks 9 & 10), March 2, 1956 (tracks 4–6) and June 8, 1956 (tracks 1–3).

== Personnel ==
- Earl Coleman – vocals
- Art Farmer – trumpet (tracks 1–6)
- Nat Howard – trumpet (tracks 7–8)
- Nat Woodyard – trumpet (tracks 9–10)
- Henderson Chambers – trombone (tracks 7–8)
- Edwin Moore – trombone (tracks 9–10)
- Gigi Gryce – alto saxophone (tracks 4–6)
- Gene Ammons – tenor saxophone (tracks 7–10)
- Gene Easton – baritone saxophone (tracks 7–8)
- Cecil Payne – baritone saxophone (tracks 9–10)
- John Houston – piano (tracks 7–8)
- Hank Jones – piano (tracks 1–6)
- Lawrence Wheatley – piano (tracks 9–10)
- Wendell Marshall – bass (tracks 1–3)
- Oscar Pettiford – bass (tracks 4–6)
- Ernie Shephard – bass (tracks 9–10)
- Ben Stuberville – bass (tracks 7–8)
- George Brown – drums (tracks 7–10)
- Wilbert Hogan – drums (tracks 1–3)
- Shadow Wilson – drums (tracks 4–6)
