= Bird Gets the Worm (album) =

Studio album by Cecil Payne
- Released: 1976
- Recorded: February 2, 1976
- Genre: Jazz
- Length: 38:40
- Label: Muse MR 5061
- Producer: Michael Cuscuna

Cecil Payne chronology
Brooklyn Brothers (1973)	Bird Gets the Worm (1976)	Bright Moments (1979)

Bird Gets the Worm is an album led by saxophonist Cecil Payne recorded in 1976 and released on the Muse label. The album features composition written, recorded, or inspired by Charlie Parker.

== Reception ==
Professional ratings
Review scores
Source	Rating
AllMusic	4.5/5 stars
The Rolling Stone Jazz Record Guide	3/5 stars

The AllMusic review by Scott Yanow called it a "high-quality straight-ahead date".

== Track listing ==
All compositions by Charlie Parker, except as indicated.

1. "Bird Gets the Worm" - 6:45
2. "Repetition" (Neal Hefti) - 7:15
3. "Ninny Melina" (Cecil Payne) - 5:35
4. "Ko-Ko" - 5:35
5. "Interpolation: All the Things You Are/Prince Albert/Bird of Paradise" (Jerome Kern /Kenny Dorham/Charlie Parker) - 6:15
6. "Constellation" - 7:15

== Personnel ==
- Cecil Payne - baritone saxophone, flute
- Tom Harrell - trumpet, flugelhorn
- Duke Jordan - piano
- Buster Williams - bass
- Al Foster - drums
