= Una Mas =

Studio album by Kenny Dorham
- Released: Early January 1964
- Recorded: April 1, 1963
- Studio: Van Gelder Studio, Englewood Cliffs, NJ
- Genre: Jazz
- Length: 36:44
- Label: Blue Note; BST 84127
- Producer: Alfred Lion

Kenny Dorham chronology
Matador (1962)	Una Mas (1964)	Trompeta Toccata (1964)

Professional ratings
Review scores
Source	Rating
AllMusic	5/5 stars
The Rolling Stone Jazz Record Guide	2/5 stars
The Penguin Guide to Jazz Recordings	3/4 stars

Una Mas, titled Una Mas (One More Time) on the front cover, is a jazz album by trumpeter Kenny Dorham and his quintet, released in 1963 on Blue Note as BLP 4127 and BST 84127. The album would be the next-to-last studio session led by the trumpeter. Una Mas features three compositions by Dorham himself. An outtake from the session, the ballad "If Ever I Would Leave You", comes from the Broadway musical Camelot.

At the time, Dorham was still relatively unknown to the jazz audience, and spoke of his lack of musical fame to Nat Hentoff:

All I can say is that if it's going to happen, it'll happen. But it's going to have to happen within a reasonable time. After all, I'll soon be into my 25th year on the trumpet. Anyway, however it goes, I'll just keep playing. That's where the basic satisfaction is at.

== Compositions ==
"Una Mas" is a 16-bar tune pertaining to bossa nova genre. Dorham felt positive about it: "The groove was very good. [...] You can switch to almost any kind of feeling when you're improvising on this; from bossa nova to blues." Dorham had earlier recorded "Una Mas" under the title "Us" and released the piece on his 1961 live album Inta Somethin'. "At the time, the tune had a shuffle beat and a written introduction that is omitted here". In a live performance of "Una Mas" recorded in January 1961 and released on the CD Flamboyan, Queens, New York, 1963 (Uptown Records UPCD2760), Dorham introduced "Una Mas" using the title "My Injun From Brazil."

"Sao Paulo" is dedicated to the Brazilian city Dorham had visited in 1960 during a tour. According to Dorham himself, the piece has "a half bossa feeling and the other half is something else". " The session outtake "If Ever I Would Leave You" had music composed by Frederick Loewe and was first issued in 1987. According to Bob Blumenthal's notes, it was "probably omitted because it presented a different feeling from the rest of the material".

== Song listing ==
All compositions by Kenny Dorham, except where noted

1. "Una Mas (One More Time)" - 15:19
2. "Straight Ahead" - 8:58
3. "Sao Paulo" - 7:20
4. "If Ever I Would Leave You" (Alan Jay Lerner, Frederick Loewe) - 5:07

== Personnel ==
- Kenny Dorham - trumpet (voice end of track 1)
- Joe Henderson - tenor saxophone
- Herbie Hancock - piano
- Butch Warren - bass
- Tony Williams - drums
