= Jazz Contemporary =

Studio album by Kenny Dorham
- Released: End of June 1960
- Recorded: February 11–12, 1960; New York City
- Genre: Jazz
- Length: 39:57 original LP
- Label: Time Records; Time 52004
- Producer: Bob Shad

Kenny Dorham chronology
The Kenny Dorham Memorial Album (1960)	Jazz Contemporary (1960)	Show Boat (1960)

Jazz Contemporary is an album by American jazz trumpeter Kenny Dorham featuring performances recorded in 1960 and released on the Time label. The album features the recording debut of pianist Steve Kuhn.

== Reception ==
Professional ratings
Review scores
Source	Rating
Allmusic	2.5/5 stars
The Rolling Stone Jazz Record Guide	4/5 stars
The Penguin Guide to Jazz Recordings	3/4 stars

The Allmusic review by Scott Yanow awarded the album 2½ stars and stated "The results are not quite essential but everyone plays up to par... It's fine hard bop, the modern mainstream music of the period".

== Track listing ==
All compositions by Kenny Dorham except as indicated

1. "A Waltz" - 5:34
2. "Monk's Mood" (Thelonious Monk) - 8:09
3. "In Your Own Sweet Way" (Dave Brubeck) - 8:01
4. "Horn Salute" - 8:27
5. "Tonica" - 2:57
6. "This Love of Mine" (Sol Parker, Henry W. Sanicola Jr., Frank Sinatra) - 6:49

Bonus tracks on CD reissue:

7. "Sign Off" - 5:29
8. "A Waltz" [alternate take] - 5:36
9. "Monk's Mood" [alternate take] (Monk) - 2:53
10. "This Love of Mine" [alternate take] (Parker, Sanicola, Sinatra) - 7:55

Recorded on February 11 (tracks 2, 3, 7, 8, 10) and February 12, 1960 (tracks 1, 4-6, 9).

== Personnel ==
- Kenny Dorham - trumpet
- Charles Davis - baritone saxophone
- Steve Kuhn - piano
- Jimmy Garrison (tracks 2, 3, 7, 8 & 10), Butch Warren (tracks 1, 4-6 & 9) - bass
- Buddy Enlow - drums
