= Ease It =

Studio album by Rocky Boyd Quintet
- Released: 1961
- Recorded: March 13, 1961
- Studio: Bell Sound (New York City)
- Genre: Jazz
- Length: 39:42 (original LP)
- Label: Jazztime Records (JTL 001); Black Lion (BLCD 760119)
- Producer: Fred Norsworthy

Kenny Dorham chronology
Whistle Stop (1961)	Ease It (1961)	Inta Somethin' (1961)

Alternative cover
- Black Lions West 42nd Street

Ease It is a jazz album credited to Rocky Boyd's Quintet, featuring Kenny Dorham on trumpet. It is the only known recording by the saxophonist, and was first released by Jazztime Records (JTL 001). It was also released by Muse Records as Ease It! (MR 5053). In 1989, Black Lion released an edition on CD titled West 42nd Street, credited to Kenny Dorham, which comprised all the takes from the session.

== Reception ==
Professional ratings
Review scores
Source	Rating
AllMusic	3/5 stars
DownBeat	2/5 stars
The Rolling Stone Jazz Record Guide	3/5 stars

The contemporaneous DownBeat reviewer commented on a strong John Coltrane influence on Boyd, but stated that little was expressed emotionally, and concluded that, "On the whole, this is a depressing and disappointing date".

== Track listing ==
Ease It (1961) (1974 Muse)

1. "Avars" (Boyd) – 7:42
2. "Stella by Starlight" (Young, Washington) – 5:05
3. "Why Not?" (LaRoca) – 7:26
4. "Ease It!" (Paul Chambers) – 10:35
5. "Samba De Orfeu" (Luiz Bonfá) – 4:31
6. "West 42nd Street" (Hardin) – 4:23

West 42nd Street (1989)

1. "Avars" [Take 3] – 7:42
2. "Stella by Starlight" [Take 1] – 5:05
3. "Stella by Starlight" [Take 2] – 5:17
4. "Why Not?" [Take 1] – 7:26
5. "Why Not?" [Take 2] – 9:17
6. "Ease It!" [Take 1] – 10:35
7. "Samba De Orfeu" [Take 5] – 4:31
8. "Samba De Orfeu" [Take 6] – 4:29
9. "West 42nd Street" [Take 7] – 3:51
10. "West 42nd Street" [Take 8] – 4:23

== Personnel ==
- Kenny Dorham – trumpet
- Rocky Boyd – tenor sax
- Walter Bishop Jr. – piano
- Ron Carter – bass
- Pete LaRoca – drums
