= Matador (Kenny Dorham album) =

Studio album by Kenny Dorham
- Released: January/early February 1963
- Recorded: April 15, 1962; Sound Makers, New York City
- Genre: Jazz
- Length: 38:18
- Label: United Artists; UAJ 14007; UAJS 15007
- Producer: Alan Douglas

Kenny Dorham chronology
Inta Somethin' (1961)	Matador (1963)	Una Mas (1963)

Matador is an album by American jazz trumpeter Kenny Dorham featuring performances recorded in 1962 and released on the United Artists label.

== Reception ==
Professional ratings
Review scores
Source	Rating
Down Beat	4/5 stars
Allmusic	4.5/5 stars

Down Beat magazine jazz critic Ira Gitler stated in his April 25, 1963 review: "Dorham and McLean, two of jazz' most passionate and lyrical players are in very good form here. Helped by a varied set of material and an energized Timmons, they have fashioned an album of surpassing interest.

The Allmusic review by Brandon Burke awarded the album 4½ stars and stated "Kenny Dorham's Matador can safely claim the all too common distinction of being a classic among jazz connoisseurs while virtually unknown to the casual listener... A fantastic session by any standard".

== Track listing ==
1. "El Matador" (Kenny Dorham) - 6:32
2. "Melanie Parts 1-3" (Jackie McLean) - 11:34
3. "Smile" (Charlie Chaplin) - 5:00
4. "Beautiful Love" (Haven Gillespie, Wayne King, Egbert Van Alstyne, Victor Young) - 5:13
5. "Prelude" (Heitor Villa-Lobos) - 4:47
6. "There Goes My Heart" (Benny Davis, Abner Silver) - 5:12

== Personnel ==
- Kenny Dorham - trumpet (except track 4)
- Jackie McLean - alto saxophone (except track 5)
- Bobby Timmons - piano
- Teddy Smith - bass (except track 5)
- J.C. Moses - drums (except track 5)
