= Cecil Payne =

American jazz saxophonist (1922–2007)

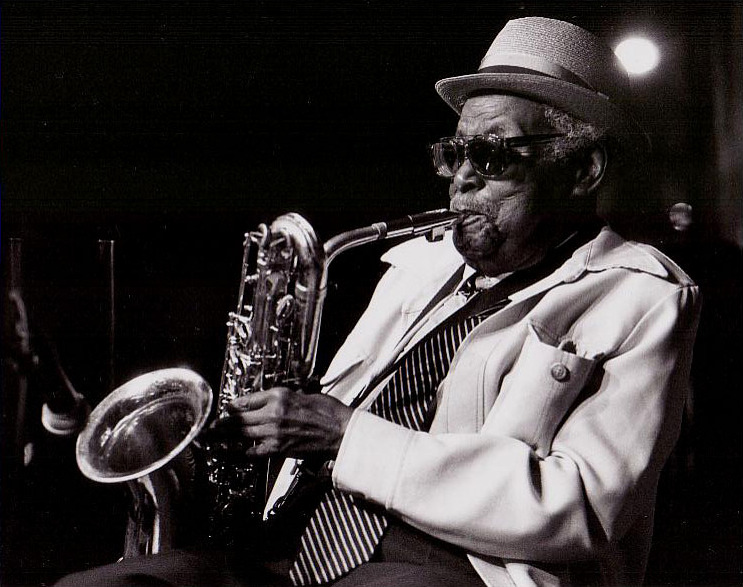
- Payne at the Kitano Hotel Jazz Club, New York City on June 11, 2005

Background information
- Born: Cecil Payne; December 14, 1922; New York City, New York, U.S.
- Died: November 27, 2007 (aged 84) Stratford, New Jersey, U.S.
- Genres: Bebop; hard bop
- Occupation: Musician
- Instruments: Baritone saxophone; alto saxophone; flute
- Label: Delmark

Cecil Payne (December 14, 1922 – November 27, 2007) was an American jazz baritone saxophonist born in Brooklyn, New York. Payne also played the alto saxophone and flute. He played with other prominent jazz musicians, in particular Dizzy Gillespie and Randy Weston, in addition to his solo work as bandleader.

== Biography ==
Payne received his first saxophone aged 13, asking his father for the instrument after hearing "Honeysuckle Rose" performed by Count Basie with Lester Young soloing. Payne took lessons from a local alto sax player, Pete Brown, and studied at Boys High School, Bedford-Stuyvesant.

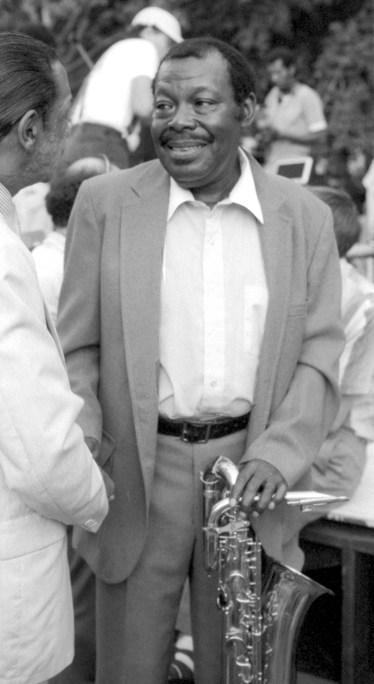
Cecil Payne, Greenwich Village Jazz Festival, Washington Square Park, New York, 1984

Payne began his professional recording career with J. J. Johnson on the Savoy label in 1946. During that year he also began playing with Roy Eldridge, through whom he met Dizzy Gillespie. His earlier recordings would largely fall under the swing category, until Gillespie hired him. Payne stayed on board until 1949, heard performing solos on "Ow!" and "Stay On It". In the early 1950s, he found himself working with Tadd Dameron, and worked with Illinois Jacquet from 1952 to 1954. He then started freelance work in New York City and frequently performed during this period with Randy Weston, whom Payne worked with until 1960. Payne was still recording regularly for Delmark Records in the 1990s, when he was in his 70s, and then into the new millennium.

Payne was a cousin of trumpeter Marcus Belgrave, with whom he recorded with briefly. Aside from his career in music, Payne helped run his father's real estate company during the 1950s. Payne once said that his parents urged him to consider dentistry as a career. He countered their suggestion by pointing out that no one would ever entrust his or her teeth to a "Dr. Payne".

He died in Stratford, New Jersey, from prostate cancer at the age of 84.

== Discography ==
=== As leader ===
- "Block Buster Boogie" b/w "Angel Child" (Decca, 1949)
- "Hippy Dippy" b/w "No Chops" (Decca, 1949)
- Patterns of Jazz (Savoy, 1957)
- Cecil Payne Performing Charlie Parker Music (Charlie Parker, 1961)
- The Connection (Charlie Parker, 1962)
- Brookfield Andante (Spotlite, 1966)
- Zodiac (Strata-East, 1968 [1973])
- Brooklyn Brothers (Muse, 1973), with Duke Jordan
- Bird Gets The Worm (Muse, 1976)
- Bright Moments (Spotlight, 1979)
- Casbah (Stash, 1985), with Richard Wyands, Joe Carter, Stafford James
- Cerupa (Delmark, 1993), with Eric Alexander, Harold Mabern and (1 track) Freddie Hubbard
- Scotch and Milk (Delmark, 1997)
- Payne's Window (Delmark, 1998)
- The Brooklyn Four Plus One (Progressive, 1999)
- Chic Boom: Live at the Jazz Showcase (Delmark, 2000), with tenor player Eric Alexander.

=== As sideman ===
With John Coltrane

- Baritones and French Horns (Prestige, 1957)
- Dakar (Prestige, 1963)

With Tadd Dameron

- Cool Boppin' (Fresh Sound, 1949)
- Fontainebleau (Prestige, 1956)

With Dameronia

- To Tadd with Love (Uptown, 1982)
- Look Stop Listen (Uptown, 1983)
- Live at the Theatre Boulogne-Billancourt Paris (Soul Note, 1989 [1994])

With Kenny Dorham

- Afro-Cuban (Blue Note, 1955)
- Blue Spring with Cannonball Adderley (Riverside, 1959)

With Dizzy Gillespie

- Pleyel 48 (Vogue, 1948)
- Dizzy Gillespie and His Big Band (GNP, 1957) – rec. 1948
- The Dizzy Gillespie Reunion Big Band (MPS, 1968)
- The Complete RCA Victor Recordings (Bluebird, 1995) – rec. 1937-49

With Illinois Jacquet

- Groovin' with Jacquet (Clef, 1956) – rec. 1951-53
- The Soul Explosion (Prestige, 1969)

With Randy Weston

- With These Hands... (Riverside, 1956)
- Jazz à la Bohemia (Riverside, 1956)
- The Modern Art of Jazz by Randy Weston (Dawn, 1956)
- Uhuru Afrika (Roulette, 1960)
- Monterey '66 (Verve, 1994) – rec. 1966

With others

- Cannonball Adderley, Julian "Cannonball" Adderley (EmArcy, 1955)
- Gene Ammons, Sock! (Prestige, 1965) – rec. 1955
- Count Basie, High Voltage (MPS, 1970)
- Nick Brignola, Burn Brigade (Bee Hive, 1980) – rec. 1979
- Kenny Burrell, Kenny Burrell (Prestige, 1957)
- Jimmy Cleveland, Introducing Jimmy Cleveland and His All Stars (EmArcy, 1956) – rec. 1955
- Kenny Clarke and Ernie Wilkins, Kenny Clarke & Ernie Wilkins (Savoy, 1955)
- Rolf Ericson, Rolf Ericson And His All American Stars (EmArcy, 1958) – rec. 1956. Originally issued by Metronome in Sweden, reissued by Fresh Sound
- Matthew Gee, Jazz by Gee (Riverside, 1956)
- Benny Golson, Stockholm Sojourn (Prestige, 1974)
- Al Grey, Struttin' and Shoutin' (Columbia, 1983) – rec. 1976
- Gigi Gryce, Doin' the Gigi (Uptown, 2011) - rec. 1957-1961
- Johnny Hammond, The Prophet (Kudu, 1972)
- Ernie Henry, Last Chorus (Riverside, 1958) – rec. 1956–57
- J. J. Johnson, J. J. Johnson's Jazz Quintets (Savoy, 1950s) – rec. 1947–49
- Quincy Jones, Golden Boy (Mercury, 1964)
- Duke Jordan, Duke Jordan Trio and Quintet (Signal, 1955)
- James Moody, The Blues and Other Colors (Milestone, 1969)
- Archie Shepp, Kwanza (Impulse!, 1974)
- Jimmy Smith, Six Views of the Blues ((Blue Note, 1999) – rec. 1958
- Sonny Stitt, Sonny Stitt Plays Arrangements from the Pen of Quincy Jones (Roost, 1955)
- Idrees Sulieman, Roots with the Prestige All Stars (New Jazz, 1957)
- Clark Terry, Clark Terry (EmArcy, 1955)
- Leon Thomas, Blues and the Soulful Truth (Flying Dutchman, 1973) – rec. 1972
- Ernie Wilkins, Septet (Savoy, 1955)
