= Patterns of Jazz =

Studio album by Cecil Payne
- Released: 1957
- Recorded: May 19 & 22, 1956; Van Gelder Studio, Hackensack, New Jersey
- Genre: Jazz
- Length: 43:30
- Label: Savoy; MG 12147 (originally Signal S 1203)

Cecil Payne chronology
Patterns of Jazz (1957)	Shaw 'Nuff (1961)

Patterns of Jazz is an album by saxophonist Cecil Payne recorded in 1956 and re-issued on the Savoy label. The original release was under the title "Cecil Payne Quartet And Quintet" on the short-lived Signal label.

== Reception ==
Professional ratings
Review scores
Source	Rating
AllMusic	4/5 stars

The AllMusic review by Jim Todd stated: "For listeners who have yet to become acquainted with Cecil Payne, this classic mid-'50s Savoy recording would make a good introduction".

== Track listing ==
All compositions by Cecil Payne, except as indicated

1. "This Time the Dream's on Me" (Harold Arlen, Johnny Mercer) - 3:46
2. "How Deep Is the Ocean?" (Irving Berlin) - 7:47
3. "Chessman's Delight" (Randy Weston) - 5:27
4. "Arnetta" - 3:38
5. "Saucer Eyes" (Weston) - 6:38
6. "Man of Moods" (Duke Jordan, Cecil Payne) - 5:33
7. "Bringing up Father" - 6:19
8. "Groovin' High" (Dizzy Gillespie) - 4:22
- Recorded at Van Gelder Studio on May 19 (tracks 1–4) and May 22 (tracks 5–8), 1956

== Personnel ==
- Cecil Payne - baritone saxophone
- Kenny Dorham - trumpet (tracks 5–8)
- Duke Jordan - piano
- Tommy Potter - bass
- Art Taylor - drums
