= Turkish Women at the Bath =

- Cover art for the album, featuring The Turkish Bath by Jean-Auguste-Dominique Ingres

Studio album by Pete La Roca
- Released: 1967
- Recorded: May 25, 1967
- Studio: Impact Sound Studios, NYC
- Genre: Jazz
- Length: 35:10
- Label: Douglas; SD 782
- Producer: Alan Douglas

Pete La Roca chronology
Basra (1965)	Turkish Women at the Bath (1967)	Swingtime (1997)

Bliss! Cover

Turkish Women at the Bath is an album by drummer Pete La Roca which features saxophonist John Gilmore and pianist Chick Corea. It was recorded in 1967 and was originally released on the Douglas label.

The album was rereleased in 1973 on Muse Records under Corea's name as Bliss!, but was withdrawn after legal action by La Roca.

== Reception ==
Professional ratings
Review scores
Source	Rating
AllMusic	4/5 stars
All About Jazz	4/5 stars
DownBeat	3/5 stars
The Penguin Guide to Jazz Recordings	3.5/4 stars

The AllMusic review by Scott Yanow commented: "it was actually drummer Pete La Roca's date, and he contributes seven now-forgotten but quite intriguing originals. But of greatest interest is the playing of tenor saxophonist John Gilmore, heard during one of his few excursions away from Sun Ra. Fine advanced hard bop". On All About Jazz, Jim Santella noted Turkish Women at the Bath is based on the painting by Jean-Auguste-Dominique Ingres, offering inspiration for each of LaRoca's seven compositions. The drummer, as leader, drives the rhythm and surrounds his quartet with shimmering cymbals".

== Track listing ==
All compositions by Pete La Roca.

1. "Turkish Women at the Bath" – 5:14
2. "Dancing Girls" – 5:50
3. "Love Planet" – 5:28
4. "Marjoun" – 3:34
5. "Bliss" – 4:58
6. "Sin Street" – 7:00
7. "And So" – 1:21
8. "And So" – 1:45
- Note: original LP track durations listed. Some versions contain an alternate sequencing.

== Personnel ==
- Pete La Roca – drums
- John Gilmore – tenor saxophone
- Chick Corea – piano
- Walter Booker - bass
