= Jazz by Gee =

Jazz by Gee!

Studio album by Matthew Gee
- Released: 1956
- Recorded: July 19 and August 22, 1956; Reeves Sound Studios, New York City
- Genre: Jazz
- Length: 41:32
- Labels: Riverside; RLP 12-221
- Producers: Bill Grauer and Orrin Keepnews

Matthew Gee chronology
Jazz by Gee! (1956)	Soul Groove (1963)

Jazz by Gee! is the debut album by American jazz trombonist Matthew Gee featuring tracks recorded in 1956 for the Riverside label.

== Reception ==
Professional ratings
Review scores
Source	Rating
Allmusic	2/5 stars
The Penguin Guide to Jazz Recordings	3/4 stars

Allmusic awarded the album 2 stars with Scott Yanow stating "The music is quite bop-oriented and mixes together standards with three swinging Gee originals. An underrated and generally overlooked gem by a forgotten trombonist".

== Track listing ==
All compositions by Matthew Gee except as indicated

1. "Out of Nowhere" (Johnny Green, Edward Heyman) - 3:24
2. "I'll Remember April" (Gene de Paul, Patricia Johnston, Don Raye) - 4:16
3. "Joram" (Bill Massey) - 3:04
4. "Sweet Georgia Brown" (Ben Bernie, Kenneth Casey, Maceo Pinkard) - 2:58
5. "Lover Man" (Jimmy Davis, Ram Ramirez, Jimmy Sherman) - 6:11
6. "Gee!" - 5:00
7. "Kingston Lounge" - 8:45
8. "The Boys from Brooklyn" - 7:54
- Recorded at Reeves Sound Studios in New York City on July 19 (tracks 6–8) and August 22 (tracks 1–5), 1956

== Personnel ==
- Matthew Gee - trombone
- Kenny Dorham - trumpet (tracks 6–8)
- Ernie Henry - alto saxophone (tracks 1–5)
- Frank Foster - tenor saxophone (tracks 6–8)
- Cecil Payne - baritone saxophone (tracks 6–8)
- Joe Knight - piano
- John Simmons (tracks 6–8), Wilbur Ware (tracks 1–5) - bass
- Art Taylor - drums
