= Presenting Ernie Henry =

Studio album by Ernie Henry
- Released: 1956
- Recorded: August 23 & 30, 1956; Reeves Sound Studios, New York City
- Genre: Jazz
- Length: 38:48
- Label: Riverside; RLP 12-222
- Producer: Orrin Keepnews

Ernie Henry chronology
Presenting Ernie Henry (1956)	Seven Standards and a Blues (1957)

Presenting Ernie Henry is the debut album by American jazz saxophonist Ernie Henry featuring tracks recorded in 1956 for the Riverside label.

== Reception ==
Professional ratings
Review scores
Source	Rating
Allmusic	4/5 stars
The Penguin Guide to Jazz Recordings	3/4 stars

Allmusic awarded the album 4 stars with Scott Yanow stating "Altoist Ernie Henry's first of three sessions as a leader, all of which were made within 16 months of his premature death, served as a strong debut... Throughout the date, Henry hints strongly at the great potential he had".

== Track listing ==
All compositions by Ernie Henry except as indicated

1. "Gone with the Wind" (Herb Magidson, Allie Wrubel) - 3:24
2. "Orient" - 5:10
3. "Free Flight" - 5:48
4. "Checkmate" - 5:55
5. "Active Ingredients" - 5:03
6. "I Should Care" (Sammy Cahn, Axel Stordahl, Paul Weston) - 5:07
7. "Cleo's Chant" - 8:21
- Recorded at Reeves Sound Studios in New York City on August 23 (tracks 1–4) and August 30 (tracks 5–7), 1956

== Personnel ==
- Ernie Henry - alto saxophone
- Kenny Dorham - trumpet
- Kenny Drew - piano
- Wilbur Ware - bass
- Art Taylor - drums
