= Page One (Joe Henderson album) =

1963 studio album by Joe Henderson

Studio album by Joe Henderson
- Released: Mid-October 1963
- Recorded: June 3, 1963
- Studio: Van Gelder Studio, Englewood Cliffs
- Genre: Jazz, hard bop
- Length: 41:54
- Label: Blue Note; BST 84140
- Producer: Alfred Lion

Joe Henderson chronology
Page One (1963)	Our Thing (1963)

Page One is the debut album by American jazz tenor saxophonist Joe Henderson, recorded and released by Blue Note Records in 1963. Henderson is featured in a group with trumpeter Kenny Dorham, pianist McCoy Tyner, bassist Butch Warren and drummer Pete La Roca. The pieces on the album were written by either Henderson or Dorham, and include two pieces that went on to become jazz standards: Henderson's "Recorda Me" and Dorham's "Blue Bossa". All of the musicians are listed on the album's front cover with the exception of Tyner, who is credited as "ETC." due to his being signed to rival Impulse! Records.

== Reception ==
Professional ratings
Review scores
Source	Rating
AllMusic	5/5 stars
DownBeat (Original LP release)	3.5/5 stars
The Penguin Guide to Jazz Recordings	4/4 stars
The Rolling Stone Jazz Record Guide	4/5 stars

AllMusic describes the album as a "particularly strong and historic effort". According to All About Jazz, Page One is still one of Henderson's "most critically acclaimed albums". PopMatters, by contrast, prefers later works, indicating in one review that Page One "has the careful feel of a leader's first session". The album was identified by Scott Yanow in his AllMusic essay, "Hard Bop", as one of the 17 Essential hard bop Recordings.

The album was released on CD in 1988 by Blue Note and has been in print consistently since then.

== Track listing ==
All compositions are by Joe Henderson except where noted.

1. "Blue Bossa" (Kenny Dorham) – 8:03
2. "La Mesha" (Kenny Dorham) – 9:10
3. "Homestretch" – 4:15
4. "Recorda Me" – 6:03
5. "Jinrikisha" – 7:24
6. "Out of the Night" – 7:23

== Personnel ==
- Joe Henderson – tenor saxophone
- Kenny Dorham – trumpet
- McCoy Tyner – piano
- Butch Warren – bass
- Pete La Roca – drums

Production

- Alfred Lion – producer
- Reid Miles – design, cover design
- Rudy Van Gelder – engineer, remastering, digital remastering
- Francis Wolff – photography, cover photo
- Michael Cuscuna – CD reissue producer
- Bob Blumenthal – reissue liner notes
- Kenny Dorham – liner notes
