= Jump for Joy (Cannonball Adderley album) =

Studio album by Cannonball Adderley
- Released: 1958
- Recorded: August 20 & 21, 1958
- Genre: Jazz
- Label: EmArcy

Cannonball Adderley chronology
Portrait of Cannonball (1958)	Jump for Joy (1958)	Things Are Getting Better (1958)

Jump for Joy (1958) is the final album by jazz saxophonist Cannonball Adderley released on the EmArcy label and featuring Adderley with an orchestra arranged by Bill Russo.

== Reception ==
The Allmusic review by Stewart Mason states: "Something of a companion album to the earlier Julian Cannonball Adderley and Strings, Jump for Joy sounds like it could be outtakes from the same sessions in terms of its orchestral-quality arrangements, but this is very much its own album. Jump for Joy is Adderley's reinterpretation, circa 1958, of a Duke Ellington stage musical from 1941.... Hearing Adderley's often thrilling, always well-constructed alto sax improvisations over tunes like the standard 'I Got It Bad and That Ain't Good' is reason enough for the album to exist, and although Russo's orchestral flourishes occasionally threaten to overwhelm the soloist (especially on the closing 'The Tune of the Hickory Stick'), they're always at the very least charming examples of '50s jazz-pop arrangements". The Penguin Guide to Jazz gave the album a three-star rating, saying: "Jump for Joy puts Cannonball with Richard Hayman's strings for the first half, and it's not the happiest of combinations, though the sheer alacrity of Adderrley's sound energises some otherwise tepid writing. The second half, arranged by Bill Russo to accommodate a string quartet beside a familiar rhythm section works better."

Professional ratings
Review scores
Source	Rating
Allmusic	3/5 stars
Penguin Guide to Jazz	3/4 stars

== Track listing ==
1. "Two Left Feet" (Hal Borne, Paul Francis Webster) - 3:12
2. "Just Squeeze Me (But Please Don't Tease Me)" (Duke Ellington, Lee Gaines) - 3:15
3. "I Got It Bad (And That Ain't Good)" (Ellington, Webster) - 2:35
4. "Nothin'" (Borne, Ray Golden, Sid Kuller) - 4:32
5. "Jump for Joy" (Ellington, Kuller, Webster) - 3:18
6. "Bli Blip" (Ellington, Kuller) - 3:48
7. "Chocolate Shake" (Ellington, Webster) - 2:40
8. "If Life Were All Peaches and Cream" (Borne, Webster) - 5:12
9. "Brown-Skin Gal (In the Calico Gown)" (Ellington, Webster) - 2:47
10. "The Tune of the Hickory Stick" (Borne, Webster) - 3:24

- Recorded in New York City on August 20 (tracks 3–5 & 9) & August 21 (tracks 1–2, 6–8 & 10), 1958

== Personnel ==
- Cannonball Adderley - alto saxophone
- Emmett Berry - trumpet
- Leo Kruczek, Gene Orloff - violin
- Dave Schwartz - viola
- George Ricci - cello
- Bill Evans - piano
- Barry Galbraith - guitar
- Milt Hinton - bass
- Jimmy Cobb - drums
- Richard Hayman, Bill Russo - arranger

Technical

- Emmett McBain - album design
- Don Bronstein - photography
