= Brooklyn Brothers =

Studio album by Cecil Payne and Duke Jordan
- Released: 1973
- Recorded: March 16, 1973
- Genre: Jazz
- Length: 37:51
- Label: Muse MR 5015
- Producer: Don Schlitten

Cecil Payne chronology
Zodiac (1968)	Brooklyn Brothers (1973)	Bird Gets the Worm (1976)

Duke Jordan chronology
East and West of Jazz (1962)	Brooklyn Brothers (1973)	The Murray Hill Caper (1973)

Brooklyn Brothers is an album led by saxophonist Cecil Payne and pianist Duke Jordan recorded in 1973 and released on the Muse label.

== Reception ==
Professional ratings
Review scores
Source	Rating
AllMusic	4.5/5 stars

In his review for AllMusic, Ron Wynn called it "a nice session".

== Track listing ==
All compositions by Cecil Payne, except as indicated

1. "Egg Head" - 3:16
2. "I Should Care" (Sammy Cahn, Axel Stordahl, Paul Weston) - 5:31
3. "Jordu" (Duke Jordan) - 5:26
4. "Jazz Vendor" (Jordan) - 4:29
5. "Cu-Ba" - 6:05
6. "I Want to Talk About You" (Billy Eckstine) - 3:45
7. "Cerupa" - 5:12
8. "No Problem" (Jordan) - 4:07

== Personnel ==
- Cecil Payne - baritone saxophone, flute - track 7
- Duke Jordan - piano - trio track 2
- Sam Jones - bass
- Al Foster - drums
