= A Night at the "Village Vanguard" =

1958 live album by Sonny Rollins

Live album by Sonny Rollins
- Released: 1958
- Recorded: November 3, 1957
- Venue: Village Vanguard, NYC
- Genre: Hard bop
- Label: Blue Note; BLP 1581
- Producer: Alfred Lion

Sonny Rollins chronology
Newk's Time (1957)	A Night at the "Village Vanguard" (1958)	Sonny Side Up (1957)

A Night at the "Village Vanguard" is a live album by American jazz saxophonist Sonny Rollins recorded at the Village Vanguard in New York City on November 3, 1957, and released on Blue Note the following year.

== Background ==
=== Recording ===
Rollins played three sets, one in the afternoon and two in the evening, with different rhythm sections: Donald Bailey and Pete LaRoca, and Wilbur Ware and Elvin Jones, respectively. The recording was made by Rudy Van Gelder, and was the first live recording made at the Village Vanguard.

=== Release history ===
More material from the recording session was discovered in 1976 and released as the double album More from the Vanguard. In 1987, the material from the original and double album was reconstructed in chronological order as two compact discs.

On September 14, 1999, the remastered album was reissued by Blue Note as part of its Rudy Van Gelder series.

On April 26, 2024, the album was again reissued by Blue Note, remastered for the first time from the original master tapes.

== Critical reception ==
Professional ratings
Review scores
Source	Rating
AllMusic	5/5 stars
Robert Christgau	A−
The Penguin Guide to Jazz	4/4 stars
The Rolling Stone Jazz Record Guide	4/5 stars

The AllMusic review by Scott Yanow states: "This CD is often magical. Sonny Rollins, one of jazz's great tenors, is heard at his peak... Not only did Rollins have a very distinctive sound, but his use of time, his sly wit, and his boppish but unpredictable style were completely his own by 1957."

Music critic Robert Christgau highly praised the album, writing: "Rollins is charged with venturing far out from these tunes without severing the harmonic moorings normally secured by a piano. He does it again and again—but not without a certain cost in ebullience, texture, and fullness of breath. Impressive always, fun in passing, his improvisations are what avant-garde jazz is for."

The album was identified by Scott Yanow in his AllMusic essay "Hard Bop" as one of the 17 Essential Hard Bop Recordings.

The Penguin Guide to Jazz gave it a maximum four stars plus crown, and included the album in its “core collection”, concluding that "these are record[ing]s which demand a place in any collection".

== Track listing ==
=== A Night at the "Village Vanguard" (LP, 1958) ===
All tracks from the evening sets except as indicated.

Side 1
No.	Title	Writer(s)	Length
1.	"Old Devil Moon"	E.Y. Harburg; Burton Lane	8:19
2.	"Softly, as in a Morning Sunrise"	Oscar Hammerstein II; Sigmund Romberg	8:03
3.	"Striver's Row"	Sonny Rollins	5:59

Side 2
No.	Title	Writer(s)	Length
1.	"Sonnymoon for Two"	Sonny Rollins	8:46
2.	"A Night in Tunisia" (afternoon set)	Dizzy Gillespie; Frank Paparelli	8:16
3.	"I Can't Get Started"	Ira Gershwin; Vernon Duke	4:54

=== A Night at the "Village Vanguard", Volume 1 (CD, 1987) ===
All tracks from the evening sets except as indicated; program in chronological order as presented originally.

No.	Title	Writer(s)	Length
1.	"A Night in Tunisia" (afternoon set)	Dizzy Gillespie, Frank Paparelli	8:16
2.	"I've Got You Under My Skin" (afternoon set)	Cole Porter	10:03
3.	"A Night in Tunisia"	Dizzy Gillespie, Frank Paparelli	9:03
4.	"Softly, as in a Morning Sunrise" (alternate take)	Oscar Hammerstein, Sigmund Romberg	6:43
5.	"Four"	Miles Davis	8:26
6.	"introduction"		0:20
7.	"Woody 'n' You"	Dizzy Gillespie	8:29
8.	"introduction"		0:36
9.	"Old Devil Moon"	E.Y. Harburg, Burton Lane	8:19

=== A Night at the "Village Vanguard", Volume 2 (CD, 1987) ===
No.	Title	Writer(s)	Length
1.	"What Is This Thing Called Love?"	Cole Porter	14:03
2.	"Softly, as in a Morning Sunrise"	Oscar Hammerstein, Sigmund Romberg	8:03
3.	"Sonnymoon for Two"	Sonny Rollins	8:46
4.	"I Can't Get Started"	Ira Gershwin, Vernon Duke	4:54
5.	"I'll Remember April"	Don Raye, Patricia Johnston, Gene de Paul	9:20
6.	"Get Happy"	Ted Koehler, Harold Arlen	9:08
7.	"Striver's Row"	Sonny Rollins	5:59
8.	"All the Things You Are"	Oscar Hammerstein, Jerome Kern	6:46
9.	"Get Happy" (alternate take)	Ted Koehler, Harold Arlen	4:38

== Personnel ==
=== Musicians ===
==== November 3, 1957 – afternoon set ====
- Sonny Rollins – tenor saxophone
- Donald Bailey – bass
- Pete LaRoca – drums

==== November 3, 1957 – evening sets ====
- Sonny Rollins – tenor saxophone
- Wilbur Ware – bass
- Elvin Jones – drums

=== Technical personnel ===
==== Original ====
- Alfred Lion – producer
- Rudy Van Gelder – recording engineer, mastering engineer
- Reid Miles – design
- Francis Wolff – photography
- Leonard Feather – liner notes

==== Reissue ====
- Michael Cuscuna – producer
- Ron McMaster – digital transfer
- Michael Cuscuna, Leonard Feather (original) – liner notes
