= Showboat (Kenny Dorham album) =

Studio album by Kenny Dorham Quintet
- Released: End of January 1961
- Recorded: December 9, 1960; New York City
- Genre: Jazz
- Length: 32:24
- Label: Time Records; Time 52024
- Producer: Bob Shad

Kenny Dorham chronology
Jazz Contemporary (1960)	Showboat (1961)	Whistle Stop (1961)

Showboat is an album by American jazz trumpeter Kenny Dorham featuring performances of tunes from the Jerome Kern-Oscar Hammerstein II musical Show Boat recorded in 1960 and released on the Time label.

== Reception ==
Professional ratings
Review scores
Source	Rating
Allmusic	4/5 stars
The Rolling Stone Jazz Record Guide	3/5 stars
The Penguin Guide to Jazz Recordings	3.5/4 stars

The Allmusic review by Scott Yanow awarded the album 4 stars and stated "This is one of Dorham's better sessions from the era and is easily recommended to his fans and collectors of hard bop".

== Track listing ==
All compositions by Jerome Kern except as indicated

1. "Why Do I Love You?" - 6:02
2. "Nobody Else But Me" - 5:41
3. "Can't Help Lovin' Dat Man" - 6:37
4. "Make Believe" - 5:49
5. "Ol' Man River" - 4:14
6. "Bill" - 4:01

== Personnel ==
- Kenny Dorham - trumpet
- Jimmy Heath - tenor saxophone
- Kenny Drew - piano
- Jimmy Garrison - bass
- Art Taylor - drums
