= Kenny Dorham Quintet (album) =

Studio album by Kenny Dorham
- Released: 1954
- Recorded: December 15, 1953
- Studio: Van Gelder Studio, Hackensack, NJ
- Genre: Jazz
- Length: 39:00
- Label: Debut; DLP-9

Kenny Dorham chronology
| Kenny Dorham Quintet (1954) | Afro-Cuban (1955) |

Professional ratings
Review scores
| Source | Rating |
|---|---|
| Allmusic | 4/5 stars |
| The Rolling Stone Jazz Record Guide | 4/5 stars |
| The Penguin Guide to Jazz Recordings | 3.5/4 stars |

Kenny Dorham Quintet is a jazz studio album by trumpeter Kenny Dorham. It was his debut album as a leader and was released in 1953, on the Debut label as DLP-9 and originally included only tracks 1 to 3 and 5 to 7. Tracks 4 and 8 were released as bonus tracks on 12-inch LP OJC-113, whilst the CD release featured the previously unreleased tracks 9, 10 and 11. According to the liner notes on the CD back cover "Label head Charles Mingus decided not to release them at the time and they languished in the tape vault for almost 40 years, until their fortuitous discovery in late 1992".

== CD track listing ==
1. "An Oscar for Oscar" [take 1] (Kenny Dorham) 2:48
2. "Ruby, My Dear" [take 2] (Thelonious Monk) 3:05
3. "Be My Love" [take 2] (Nicholas Brodzsky, Sammy Cahn) 3:34
4. "Ruby, My Dear" [take 1] 3:09
5. "Osmosis" (Osie Johnson) 2:42
6. "I Love You" (Cole Porter) 3:53
7. "Darn That Dream" [Take 1] (Jimmy Van Heusen, Eddie DeLange) 4:47
8. "Darn That Dream" [Take 2] 4:54
9. "I Love You" [Take 2] 3:54
10. "Chicago Blues" (Paul Biese, James Altieri, S. Walter Williams) 2:54
11. "Lonesome Lover Blues" (George Jackson, Jean Lenoir) 3:06
- Recorded at Van Gelder Studio, Hackensack, NJ on December 15, 1953 (tracks 1–9) and in New York City on October 21, 1953 (tracks 10 & 11).

== Personnel ==
- Kenny Dorham - trumpet, vocal (tracks 10, 11)
- Jimmy Heath - saxophones
- Walter Bishop - piano
- Percy Heath - bass
- Kenny Clarke - drums
