= Trompeta Toccata =

Studio album by Kenny Dorham
- Released: End of July 1965
- Recorded: September 14, 1964
- Studio: Van Gelder Studio, Englewood Cliffs, NJ
- Genre: Jazz
- Length: 37:06
- Label: Blue Note; BST 84181
- Producer: Alfred Lion

Kenny Dorham chronology
Una Mas (1963)	Trompeta Toccata (1965)

Professional ratings
Review scores
Source	Rating
Allmusic	4/5 stars
The Penguin Guide to Jazz Recordings	3.5/4 stars
DownBeat	3.5/5 stars

Trompeta Toccata is a 1964 album by jazz trumpeter Kenny Dorham. It was released by Blue Note Records in 1965 as BST 84181. It was remastered by original recording engineer Rudy Van Gelder in 2006. Trompeta Toccata, as with Dorham's previous album Una Mas, features only four pieces, three of which were written by the trumpeter himself. Trompeta Toccata would be his last appearance as a leader; Bob Blumenthal wrote in his 2006 liner notes for the album that "the remainder of Dorhams' recorded career was confined to sideman appearances that can be counted on the fingers of one hand".

== The pieces ==
Dorham felt very satisfied working with these musicians - Joe Henderson, Tommy Flanagan, Richard Davis and especially Albert Heath - "he always kept the soloist sparked up." About Henderson, he stated "He never fails to excite me" explaining "For instance, after I played him the melody of 'Trompeta Toccata', he wrote the chords for it. And what he wrote is what I heard in my own ear". Dorham chose the title Trompeta Toccata "since the term "toccata" comes from a Latin language base, and since the song is in 6/8 with an Afro-Latin feeling; it seemed logical to make the whole title Latin". According to Dorham, "Night Watch", a bluesy piece, speaks of the night and darkness; "It's very late at night, and the mood is what comes when you're alone at that time". "Mamacita" is a 12-bars bossa nova. During its recording, Dorham recalls that once they got started on it, they caught fire; even Blue Note producer Alfred Lion and photographer Francis Wolff began to move to rhythm.

== Song listing ==
All songs composed by Kenny Dorham, except where noted.

1. "Trompeta Toccata" - 12:21
2. "Night Watch" - 5:44
3. "Mamacita" (Joe Henderson) - 11:02
4. "The Fox" - 7:59

== Personnel ==
- Kenny Dorham - trumpet
- Joe Henderson - tenor saxophone
- Tommy Flanagan - piano
- Richard Davis - double bass
- Albert Heath - drums
