= Seven Standards and a Blues =

Studio album by Ernie Henry
- Released: 1957
- Recorded: September 30, 1957; Reeves Sound Studios, New York City
- Genre: Jazz
- Length: 39:33
- Labels: Riverside; RLP 12-248
- Producer: Orrin Keepnews

Ernie Henry chronology
Presenting Ernie Henry (1956)	Seven Standards and a Blues (1957)	Last Chorus (1956-57)

Seven Standards and a Blues is the second album by American jazz saxophonist Ernie Henry featuring tracks recorded in 1957 for the Riverside label.

== Reception ==
Professional ratings
Review scores
Source	Rating
Allmusic	3/5 stars
The Penguin Guide to Jazz Recordings	3/4 stars

Allmusic awarded the album 3 stars with Scott Yanow stating "Recorded just three months before his unexpected death, this set by altoist Ernie Henry is his definitive album as a leader... Superior modern mainstream music, but there should have been much more from the potentially significant Ernie Henry".

== Track listing ==
1. "I Get a Kick Out of You" (Cole Porter) - 4:39
2. "My Ideal" (Newell Chase, Leo Robin, Richard A. Whiting) - 2:46
3. "I've Got the World on a String" (Harold Arlen, Ted Koehler) - 6:33
4. "Sweet Lorraine" (Cliff Burwell, Mitchell Parish) - 5:01
5. "Soon" (George Gershwin, Ira Gershwin) - 6:00
6. "Lover Man" (Jimmy Davis, Ram Ramirez, James Sherman) - 2:41
7. "Specific Gravity" (Ernie Henry) - 6:39
8. "Like Someone in Love" (Johnny Burke, Jimmy Van Heusen) - 5:14

== Personnel ==
- Ernie Henry - alto saxophone
- Wynton Kelly - piano
- Wilbur Ware - bass
- Philly Joe Jones - drums
