= 'Round About Midnight at the Cafe Bohemia =

Live album by Kenny Dorham
- Released: Late 1956
- Recorded: May 31, 1956
- Venues: Café Bohemia, NYC
- Genre: Jazz
- Length: 2:02:44 (complete)
- Labels: Blue Note; BLP 1524
- Producer: Alfred Lion

Kenny Dorham chronology
Afro-Cuban (1955)	'Round About Midnight at the Cafe Bohemia (1956)	Jazz Contrasts (1957)

'Round About Midnight at the Cafe Bohemia is a live album by American jazz trumpeter Kenny Dorham recorded at the Café Bohemia on May 31, 1956 and released on Blue Note later that year.

== Background ==
=== Composition and recording ===
The song "Hill's Edge", credited to Dorham on the release, is partially the jazz standard Tune Up played with a new introduction and contrafact composed by Dorham. "N.Y. Theme", credited to Dorham on the release, is Thelonious Monk's 52nd Street Theme. "Royal Roost", which Dorham had recorded in 1946 as a member of Kenny Clarke's 52nd Street Boys group, was recorded by Sonny Rollins in May 1956 under the title Tenor Madness. "Mexico City" is a contrafact of Bud Powell's composition Tempus Fugit.

=== Release history ===
The original release featured 6 tracks; another 11 tracks, including some alternate takes, were released on two LPs in 1984 on the Japanese Blue Note label, as BNJ 61003/61004. A complete edition was released as a double-CD set in 2002.

== Reception ==
Professional ratings
Review scores
Source	Rating
AllMusic	4.5/5 stars
The Penguin Guide to Jazz	4/4 stars

The AllMusic review states, "This music is designed for relaxing and grooving out. It will greatly assist anyone who is traveling by night or trying to make it through to the end of another day."

The Penguin Guide to Jazz selected album as part of its suggested Core Collection, giving it four-of-four stars.

== Track listing ==
=== Original release ===
All tracks are written by Kenny Dorham, except as noted.

Side 1
No.	Title	Writer(s)	Length
1.	"Monaco"
2.	"'Round About Midnight"	Thelonious Monk
3.	"Mexico City"

Side 2
No.	Title	Writer(s)	Length
1.	"A Night in Tunisia"	Gillespie*, Robin
2.	"Autumn in New York"	Vernon Duke
3.	"Hill's Edge"

=== The Complete 'Round About Midnight at the Cafe Bohemia ===
All tracks are written by Kenny Dorham, except as noted.

Disc one
No.	Title	Writer(s)	Original release	Length
1.	"K.D.'s Blues" (alternate take)		Volume 3	10:41
2.	"Autumn in New York"	Vernon Duke	Volume 1	4:38
3.	"Monaco" (alternate take)		Volume 3	5:33
4.	"N.Y. Theme"		Volume 3	5:39
5.	"K.D.'s Blues"		Volume 2	9:30
6.	"Hill's Edge"		Volume 1	8:16
7.	"A Night in Tunisia"	Dizzy Gillespie; Frank Paparelli	Volume 1	9:31
8.	"Who Cares?" (alternate take)	George Gershwin; Ira Gershwin	Volume 3	4:59
9.	"Royal Roost"	Kenny Clarke; Dorham	Volume 2	8:41

Disc two
No.	Title	Writer(s)	Original release	Length
1.	"Mexico City"		Volume 1	6:02
2.	"'Round About Midnight"	Thelonious Monk	Volume 1	7:44
3.	"Monaco"		Volume 1	6:37
4.	"Who Cares?"	Gershwin; Gershwin	Volume 2	6:21
5.	"My Heart Stood Still"	Lorenz Hart; Richard Rodgers	Volume 2	7:49
6.	"Riffin'"	Dorham; Horace Henderson	Volume 3	7:50
7.	"Mexico City" (alternate take)		Volume 2	6:33
8.	"The Prophet"		Volume 2	6:20

== Personnel ==
=== Musicians ===
- Kenny Dorham – trumpet
- J. R. Monterose – tenor saxophone
- Kenny Burrell – guitar
- Bobby Timmons – piano
- Sam Jones – bass
- Arthur Edgehill – drums

=== Technical personnel ===
==== Original ====
- Alfred Lion – producer
- Rudy Van Gelder – recording engineer, mastering
- Reid Miles – design
- Francis Wolff – photography
- Leonard Feather – liner notes

==== Reissue ====
- Michael Cuscuna – producer
- Rudy Van Gelder – remastering

== Charts ==
=== Weekly charts ===
Weekly chart performance for The Complete 'Round About Midnight at the Cafe Bohemia
Chart (2026)	Peak position
UK Jazz & Blues Albums (Official Charts)	6
US Top Jazz Albums (Billboard)	21
US Top Traditional Jazz Albums (Billboard)	15

=== Monthly charts ===
Monthly chart performance for The Complete 'Round About Midnight at the Cafe Bohemia
Chart (2026)	Peak position
German Jazz Albums (Offizielle Top 100)	7
