= Blues to Coltrane =

Studio album by Cal Massey
- Released: 1987
- Recorded: January 13, 1961
- Studio: Nola Penthouse Sound Studio, New York City
- Genre: Jazz
- Label: Candid; CS 9029

Blues to Coltrane is an album by trumpeter and composer Cal Massey. Documenting his only session as a leader, and featuring five original compositions, it was recorded on January 13, 1961, at Nola Penthouse Sound Studio in New York City, and was posthumously released in 1987 by Candid Records. On the album, the recording of which was supervised by Nat Hentoff, Massey is joined by saxophonist Hugh Brodie, French hornist Julius Watkins, pianist Patti Bown, double bassist Jimmy Garrison, and drummer G.T. Hogan.

An excerpt from the track titled "Father and Son" appeared on the 1961 Candid compilation album The Jazz Life!, credited to the Jazz Artists Guild.

== Reception ==
Professional ratings
Review scores
Source	Rating
AllMusic	4.5/5 stars
MusicHound Jazz	3.5/5 stars
The Penguin Guide to Jazz	3/4 stars

The authors of The Penguin Guide to Jazz Recordings called the album "a solitary glimpse of a briefly influential but slightly tragic figure," and wrote: "No one will pretend that Massey is a lost giant, even on a par with Herbie Nichols or Sonny Clark, but he is an intriguing second-rank figure who merits attention."

Steve Holtje of MusicHound Jazz described the album as "a valuable document" despite the fact that it "suffers from poor engineering and a sub-standard piano." He stated: "Massey's composing... is generally up to the level of his reputation... Overall, it's an enjoyable bop outing with adventurous post-bop moments."

Writing for All About Jazz, Samuel Chell commented: "The music is as original as it is conventional and accessible. It's as well played as it is occasionally somewhat ragged and amateurish in its construction and execution... If nothing else, the recording helps keep alive the name "Cal Massey," even if the man himself remains a shadowy and inscrutable figure, forever inviting questions that seem to go to the heart of the jazz life itself."

In an article for American Music Review, the newsletter of the Institute for Studies in American Music, Jeffrey Taylor noted that, on the recording, Massey "emerges as a distinctive musical personality on trumpet. Lacking the virtuosity of Hubbard or the ebullience of Morgan, he is an introverted player with a deep feeling for the blues and a sound that occasionally evokes Clark Terry."

UK Vibe's Mark Jones called the album "an important release showcasing the composer’s valuable contributions to the East Coast jazz scene and the changing political and social landscape of the 1960s in America," and remarked: "The music is deceptively unassuming with real depth, yet seemingly simplistic in its delivery. Throughout the album, subtle touches and a soulful sensitivity illuminate the compositions with restraint and understanding."

== Track listing ==
Composed by Cal Massey

1. "Blues to Coltrane" – 9:01
2. "What's Wrong" – 3:39
3. "Bakai" – 8:07
4. "These Are Soulful Days" – 8:10
5. "Father and Son" – 11:15

== Personnel ==
- Cal Massey – trumpet
- Hugh Brodie – tenor saxophone
- Julius Watkins – French horn
- Patti Bown – piano
- Jimmy Garrison – double bass
- G. T. Hogan – drums
