= Quiet Kenny =

Studio album by Kenny Dorham
- Released: February 1960
- Recorded: November 13, 1959; Van Gelder Studio, Englewood Cliffs
- Genre: Jazz, hard bop
- Length: 42:13
- Label: New Jazz
- Producer: Esmond Edwards

Kenny Dorham chronology
Blue Spring (1959)	Quiet Kenny (1960)	The Kenny Dorham Memorial Album (1960)

Quiet Kenny is an album by the American jazz trumpeter Kenny Dorham of performances recorded in 1959 and released on the New Jazz label. The album features Dorham's own composition "Lotus Blossom", which was earlier recorded by Sonny Rollins under the title "Asiatic Raes". The tune has been recorded under both titles subsequently. ("Lotus Blossom" is not to be confused with either "Lotus Blossom" by Strayhorn or "Sweet Lotus Blossom" by Coslow and Johnston.)

== Reception ==
Professional ratings
Review scores
Source	Rating
Allmusic	4.5/5 stars
DownBeat	3/5 stars
The Penguin Guide to Jazz Recordings	3.5/4 stars

The Allmusic review by Michael G. Nastos awarded the album 4½ stars and stated: "Cool and understated might be better watchwords for what the ultra-melodic Dorham achieves on this undeniably well crafted set of standards and originals that is close to containing his best work overall during a far too brief career... Never known as a boisterous or brash player, but also not a troubadour of romanticism... Dorham's music is also far from complacent, and this recording established him as a Top Five performer in jazz on his instrument. It comes recommended to all." The Penguin Guide to Jazz Recordings describes the album as “a minor masterpiece.”

== Track listing ==
1. "Lotus Blossom" [also known as "Asiatic Raes"] (Dorham) – 4:39
2. "My Ideal" (Newell Chase, Robin, Whiting) – 5:06
3. "Blue Friday" (Dorham) – 8:46
4. "Alone Together" (Howard Dietz, Arthur Schwartz) – 3:11
5. "Blue Spring Shuffle" (Dorham) – 7:38
6. "I Had the Craziest Dream" (Gordon, Warren) – 4:40
7. "Old Folks" (Dedette Lee Hill, Willard Robison) – 5:11
8. "Mack the Knife" (Bertolt Brecht, Kurt Weill) – 3:02 Bonus track on CD reissue

== Personnel ==
- Kenny Dorham – trumpet
- Tommy Flanagan – piano
- Paul Chambers – bass
- Art Taylor – drums
