= Jazz Contrasts =

Studio album by Kenny Dorham
- Released: Early October 1957
- Recorded: May 21 (#1–2, 6) and May 27 (#3–5), 1957
- Studio: Reeves Sound Studio, New York City
- Genre: Jazz
- Length: 41:02
- Label: Riverside; RLP 12-239
- Producer: Orrin Keepnews

Kenny Dorham chronology
'Round About Midnight at the Cafe Bohemia (1956)	Jazz Contrasts (1957)	2 Horns / 2 Rhythm (1957)

Jazz Contrasts is an album by American jazz trumpeter Kenny Dorham, recorded in 1957 and released on the Riverside label.

== Reception ==
Professional ratings
Review scores
Source	Rating
AllMusic	4.5/5 stars
Down Beat	4/5 stars
The Rolling Stone Jazz Record Guide	4/5 stars
The Penguin Guide to Jazz Recordings	3/4 stars

The AllMusic review by Scott Yanow stated: "This album is a bit brief in time (41 minutes) but contains many memorable selections."

== Track listing ==
1. "Falling in Love with Love" (Hart, Rodgers) - 9:14
2. "I'll Remember April" (de Paul, Patricia Johnston, Raye) - 12:07
3. "LaRue" (Brown) - 4:31
4. "My Old Flame" (Coslow, Johnston) - 5:25
5. "But Beautiful" (Burke, Van Heusen) - 2:44
6. "La Villa" (Dorham, Gryce) - 7:01

== Personnel ==
- Kenny Dorham - trumpet
- Sonny Rollins - tenor saxophone (tracks 1, 2, 4, 6)
- Hank Jones - piano
- Oscar Pettiford - bass
- Max Roach - drums
- Betty Glamann - harp (3–5)
