= Things Are Getting Better =

Studio album by Cannonball Adderley With Milt Jackson
- Released: February 1959
- Recorded: October 28, 1958
- Studio: Reeves Sound (New York City)
- Genre: Jazz
- Length: 42:51 original LP
- Label: Riverside; RLP 12-286
- Producer: Orrin Keepnews

Cannonball Adderley chronology
Jump for Joy (1958)	Things Are Getting Better (1959)	Blue Spring (1959)

Things Are Getting Better is the 11th album by jazz saxophonist Cannonball Adderley, and his second release on the Riverside label, featuring performances with Milt Jackson, Wynton Kelly, Percy Heath and Art Blakey. Recorded in October 1958, the album was released in early 1959.

== Reception ==
The AllMusic review by Lindsay Planer awarded the album 4 stars and states: "This disc can be recommended without hesitation to all manner of jazz enthusiast, as it quite literally offers something for every taste." The Penguin Guide to Jazz awarded the album 3½ stars, stating: "There is marvellous sparring with Milt Jackson on Things are Getting Better and with Kelly, Heath and Blakey also in great form." PopMatters journalist Neil Kelly wrote: "In essence, Things Are Getting Better aims to please everyone while providing those personal flourishes that makes good jazz great."

Professional ratings
Review scores
Source	Rating
AllMusic	4/5 stars
The Penguin Guide to Jazz	3.5/4 stars
PopMatters	9/10 stars

== Track listing ==
All compositions by Julian "Cannonball" Adderley except as indicated

1. "Blues Oriental" (Milt Jackson) - 5:05
2. "Things Are Getting Better" - 7:16
3. "Serves Me Right" [Take 5] (Buddy Johnson) - 4:51
4. "Serves Me Right" [Alternate Take 4] - 4:38 Bonus track on CD reissue
5. "Groovin' High" (Dizzy Gillespie) - 5:24
6. "The Sidewalks of New York" [Take 5] (James W. Blake, Charles B. Lawlor) - 7:01
7. "The Sidewalks of New York" [Alternate Take 4] - 5:16 Bonus track on CD reissue
8. "Sounds for Sid" - 6:29
9. "Just One of Those Things" (Cole Porter) - 6:45

== Personnel ==
- Cannonball Adderley - alto saxophone
- Milt Jackson - vibes
- Wynton Kelly - piano
- Percy Heath - bass
- Art Blakey - drums
