= Zodiac (Cecil Payne album) =

Studio album by Cecil Payne
- Released: 1973
- Recorded: December 16, 1968
- Studio: TownSound Studios, Englewood, NJ
- Genre: Jazz
- Length: 45:49
- Label: Strata-East SES-19734
- Producer: Clifford Jordan

Cecil Payne chronology
Brookfield Andante (1966)	Zodiac (1973)	Brooklyn Brothers (1973)

Zodiac is an album led by saxophonist Cecil Payne recorded in 1968 but not released on the Strata-East label until 1973.

== Reception ==
Professional ratings
Review scores
Source	Rating
AllMusic	4.5/5 stars

In his review for AllMusic, Ron Wynn called it an "outstanding date".

== Track listing ==
All compositions by Cecil Payne

1. "Martin Luther King, Jr." - 6:55
2. "I Know Love" - 2:09
3. "Girl, You Got a Home" - 10:48
4. "Slide Hampton" - 4:21
5. "Follow Me" - 9:16
6. "Flying Fish" - 12:20

== Personnel ==
- Cecil Payne – baritone saxophone, alto saxophone
- Kenny Dorham – trumpet
- Wynton Kelly – piano, organ
- Wilbur Ware – bass
- Albert Kuumba Heath – drums
