= Afro-Cuban (album) =

Studio album by Kenny Dorham
- Released: End of October 1955 (10"); End of May 1957 (12")
- Recorded: January 30 and March 29, 1955
- Studio: Van Gelder Studio; Hackensack, NJ
- Genre: Jazz
- Length: 18:53 (10"); 35:08 (12"); 45:44 (CD)
- Label: Blue Note; BLP 5065 (10"); BLP 1535 (12")
- Producer: Alfred Lion

Kenny Dorham chronology
Kenny Dorham Quintet (1953)	Afro-Cuban (1955)	'Round About Midnight at the Cafe Bohemia (1956)

Alternative cover
- 10" Vinyl (1955) artwork

Afro-Cuban is an album by American jazz trumpeter Kenny Dorham, recorded for Blue Note on March 29, 1955 and released later that year on the Blue Note Modern Jazz Series, shortly before the label discontinued the format. It was soon reissued on the new 1500 series, recompiled with a session by an early incarnation of the ensemble, with new cover art.

== Reception ==
Professional ratings
Review scores
Source	Rating
AllMusic	5/5 stars
The Penguin Guide to Jazz Recordings	3/4 stars

The AllMusic review by Michael G. Nastos states, "A first-rate recording for the under-appreciated Dorham, this one should be in every collection of all true music lovers."

== Track listing ==
=== 10" LP, BLP 5065 ===
All tracks are written by Kenny Dorham, except as noted.

Side 1
No.	Title	Date recorded	Length
1.	"Afrodisia"	March 29, 1955	5:06
2.	"Lotus Flower"	March 29, 1955	4:17

Side 2
No.	Title	Writer(s)	Date recorded	Length
1.	"Minor's Holiday"		March 29, 1955	4:27
2.	"Basheer's Dream"	Gigi Gryce	March 29, 1955	5:03

=== LP, BLP 1535 ===
All tracks are written by Kenny Dorham, except as noted.

Side 1
No.	Title	Writer(s)	Date recorded	Length
1.	"Afrodisia"		March 29, 1955	5:06
2.	"Lotus Flower"		March 29, 1955	4:17
3.	"Minor's Holiday"		March 29, 1955	4:27
4.	"Basheer's Dream"	Gigi Gryce	March 29, 1955	5:03

Side 2
No.	Title	Date recorded	Length
1.	"K.D.'s Motion"	January 30, 1955	5:29
2.	"La Villa"	January 30, 1955	5:24
3.	"Venita's Dance"	January 30, 1955	5:22

=== CD reissues ===
1987 reissue
No.	Title	Writer(s)	Date recorded	Length
1.	"Afrodisia"		March 29, 1955	5:02
2.	"Lotus Flower"		March 29, 1955	4:15
3.	"Minor's Holiday"		March 29, 1955	4:25
4.	"Minor's Holiday" (alternate take)		March 29, 1955	4:21
5.	"Basheer's Dream"	Gigi Gryce	March 29, 1955	5:00
6.	"K.D.'s Motion"		January 30, 1955	5:25
7.	"La Villa"		January 30, 1955	5:20
8.	"Venita's Dance"		January 30, 1955	5:18
9.	"K.D.'s Cab Ride"		January 30, 1955	6:06

- The 2007 RVG edition restores the original track order, placing the alternate take of "Minor's Holiday" at the end, and retitles "K.D.'s Cab Ride" to "Echo of Spring".

== Personnel ==
=== Musicians ===
January 30, 1955

- Kenny Dorham – trumpet
- Hank Mobley – tenor saxophone
- Cecil Payne – baritone saxophone
- Horace Silver – piano
- Percy Heath – bass
- Art Blakey – drums

March 29, 1955

- Kenny Dorham – trumpet
- J. J. Johnson – trombone
- Hank Mobley – tenor saxophone
- Cecil Payne – baritone saxophone
- Horace Silver – piano
- Oscar Pettiford – bass
- Art Blakey – drums
- Carlos "Patato" Valdes – conga
- Richie Goldberg – cowbell

=== Technical personnel ===
Original

- Alfred Lion – producer
- Rudy Van Gelder – recording engineer
- Reid Miles – design
- Francis Wolff – photography
- Leonard Feather – liner notes

Reissue

- Michael Cuscuna – producer
- Ron McMaster – digital transfer
