= Whistle Stop (album) =

Studio album by Kenny Dorham
- Released: June 1961
- Recorded: January 15, 1961
- Studio: Van Gelder Studio, Englewood Cliffs
- Genre: Jazz, hard bop
- Length: 38:43
- Label: Blue Note; BST 84063
- Producer: Alfred Lion

Kenny Dorham chronology
| Showboat (1961) | Whistle Stop (1961) | Ease It (1961) |

Professional ratings
Review scores
| Source | Rating |
|---|---|
| AllMusic | 4.5/5 stars |
| DownBeat | 3.5/5 stars |
| The Rolling Stone Jazz Record Guide | 4/5 stars |
| The Penguin Guide to Jazz Recordings | 3/4 stars |

Whistle Stop is a jazz studio album by Kenny Dorham, featuring performances by acclaimed musicians Hank Mobley, Kenny Drew, Paul Chambers and Philly Joe Jones. It was recorded in January 1961 at Van Gelder Studio, in Englewood Cliffs, and was originally released on Blue Note Records as BST 84063 and BLP 4063. "In 1975", Blumenthal states in the CD liner notes, "five British critics picked Whistle Stop as one of 200 albums that belonged in a basic library of jazz recorded after World War II".

== Notes about the album tracks ==
"Philly Twist" is dedicated to Philly Joe Jones. Kenny added "There is also the play on words with filly, a young horse." "Buffalo" tries to portray a buffalo in action, whilst "Sunset" tries to represent the feeling of an imaginary sunset. "Whistle Stop" is an attempt to depict a train in motion. About "Sunrise in Mexico", Dorham says: "The skies down there (in Mexico) are low and everything looks different". "Windmill" talks about an old girlfriend of all of us, who can live by the windmill. Dorham explains that "a windmill, a weathered, gray-wood affair, is represented in the last four bars of the track". It is also a contrafact of Sweet Georgia Brown. "Dorham's Epitaph" was intended by Dorham to be a sort of musical epitaph, an "identifying song".

== Reception ==
The contemporaneous DownBeat reviewer, John S. Wilson, praised the variety of compositions, but added that the written material was not extended beyond opening and closing statements, and that Dorham's solo playing was appealing but "almost invariably running thin toward the end".

== Song listing ==
All pieces by Kenny Dorham.

1. "Philly Twist" - 5:39
2. "Buffalo" - 7:43
3. "Sunset" - 6:20
4. "Whistle Stop" - 5:56
5. "Sunrise in Mexico" - 5:39
6. "Windmill" - 6:17
7. "Dorham's Epitaph" - 1:09

== Personnel ==
- Kenny Dorham - trumpet
- Hank Mobley - tenor sax
- Kenny Drew - piano
- Paul Chambers - double bass
- Philly Joe Jones - drums
