= Blue Spring (album) =

Studio album by Kenny Dorham with Cannonball Adderley
- Released: June 1959
- Recorded: January 20 (#5–6) & February 18 (#1–4), 1959; New York City
- Genre: Jazz
- Length: 42:13
- Label: Riverside
- Producer: Orrin Keepnews

Kenny Dorham chronology
This Is the Moment! (1958)	Blue Spring (1959)	Quiet Kenny (1959)

Cannonball Adderley chronology
Things Are Getting Better (1958)	Blue Spring (1959)	Cannonball Adderley Quintet in Chicago (1959)

Professional ratings
Review scores
Source	Rating
AllMusic	4/5 stars
The Penguin Guide to Jazz	3/4 stars
The Rolling Stone Jazz Record Guide	3/5 stars

Blue Spring is a 1959 album by jazz trumpeter Kenny Dorham and saxophonist Cannonball Adderley released on the Riverside label, featuring performances by Dorham and Adderley with Dave Amram, Cecil Payne, Cedar Walton, Paul Chambers, and Philly Joe Jones or Jimmy Cobb.

== Reception ==
The AllMusic review by Stephen Cook awarded the album 4 stars and states: "listeners new to the work of Kenny Dorham should definitely consider this somewhat overlooked Riverside date from 1959. The set features plenty of Dorham's varied and sophisticated horn work and four of his top-drawer originals.... Essential listening for Dorham fans." The Penguin Guide to Jazz awarded the album 3 stars, stating: "Dorham enjoyed a brief resurgence towards the end of the '50s".

== Track listing ==
All compositions by Kenny Dorham except as indicated

1. "Blue Spring" - 7:42
2. "It Might as Well Be Spring" (Oscar Hammerstein II, Richard Rodgers) - 7:42
3. "Poetic Spring" - 6:47
4. "Spring Is Here" (Lorenz Hart, Rodgers) - 6:39
5. "Spring Cannon" - 4:53
6. "Passion Spring" - 8:30

== Personnel ==
- Kenny Dorham - trumpet
- Cannonball Adderley - alto saxophone
- David Amram - French horn
- Cecil Payne - baritone saxophone
- Cedar Walton - piano
- Paul Chambers - bass
- Jimmy Cobb - drums (tracks 1–4)
- Philly Joe Jones - drums (5–6)
