= Pete La Roca =

American jazz drummer (1938–2012)

- Born: Peter Sims; April 7, 1938; Harlem, New York, United States
- Died: November 20, 2012 (aged 74)
- Genres: Post-bop; Latin jazz
- Occupation: Drummer

Pete "La Roca" Sims (born Peter Sims, April 7, 1938 – November 20, 2012; known as Pete La Roca from 1957 until 1968) was an American jazz drummer and attorney. Born and raised in Harlem by a pianist mother and a stepfather who played trumpet, he was introduced to jazz by his uncle Kenneth Bright, a major shareholder in Circle Records and the manager of rehearsal spaces above the Lafayette Theater. Sims studied percussion at the High School of Music and Art and at the City College of New York, where he played tympani in the CCNY Orchestra. He adopted the name La Roca early in his musical career, when he played timbales for six years in Latin bands. In the 1970s, during a hiatus from jazz performance, he resumed using his original surname. When he returned to jazz in the late 1970s, he usually inserted "La Roca" into his name in quotation marks to help audiences familiar with his early work identify him. He told The New York Times in 1982 that he did so only out of necessity:

I can't deny that I once played under the name La Roca, but I have to insist that my name is Peter Sims with La Roca in brackets or in quotes. For 16 or 17 years, when I have not been playing the music, people have known me as Sims....When I was 14 or 15, I thought ["La Roca"] was clever; right now, it's an embarrassment. I thought that it would be something that people would probably remember - boy, was I ever right on that one! I can't make my conversion.

In 1957, Max Roach became aware of him while jamming at Birdland and recommended him to Sonny Rollins. As drummer of Rollins' trio on the afternoon set at the Village Vanguard on November 3 he became part of the important record A Night at the Village Vanguard. (Only one of five recorded tracks with La Roca was included on the original single LP release of the album). In 1959 he recorded with Jackie McLean (New Soil) and in a quartet with Tony Scott, Bill Evans and Jimmy Garrison. Besides Garrison he often joined with bassists who played in the Bill Evans Trio, especially Scott LaFaro and Steve Swallow, and also accompanied pianists like Steve Kuhn, Don Friedman and Paul Bley.

Between the end of the 1950s and 1968, he also played with Slide Hampton, the John Coltrane Quartet, Marian McPartland, Art Farmer, Freddie Hubbard, Mose Allison, and Charles Lloyd, among others. During this period, he led his own group and worked as the house drummer at the Jazz Workshop in Boston, Massachusetts. He recorded two albums as a leader during the mid-1960s, Basra (Blue Note, 1965) and Turkish Women at the Bath (Douglas, 1967).

In 1968, with the market for acoustic jazz in decline, Sims decided to enroll in law school. By this time he was already earning most of his income by driving a taxi cab in New York City, a job he held for five years during the 1960s. Sims became a lawyer in the early 1970s, and was still practicing at the time of a 1997 radio interview with WNYC's Steve Sullivan. When his album Turkish Women at the Bath was re-released on Muse Records as "Bliss" in 1973 under Chick Corea's name (without Sims' consent), Sims filed a lawsuit and served as his own legal counsel. Sims won his suit, and the erroneously-labeled records were recalled.

He returned to jazz part-time in 1979, and recorded one new album as a leader, Swing Time (Blue Note, 1997).

Sims died in 2012 in New York of lung cancer, at the age of 74.

== Discography ==
=== As leader ===
- Basra (Blue Note, 1965)
- Turkish Women at the Bath (Douglas, 1967; also released as Bliss! under Chick Corea's name on Muse, 1973)
- Swingtime (Blue Note, 1997)

=== As sideman ===
With Anamari

- Anamari (Atlantic, 1964)

With Bill Barron

- Modern Windows (Savoy, 1961 [1962])

With Paul Bley

- Footloose! (Savoy, 1962–63 [1963])

With Rocky Boyd

- Ease It (Jazztime, 1961)

With Jaki Byard

- Hi-Fly (New Jazz, 1962)

With Sonny Clark

- My Conception (Blue Note, 1957 [1979])
- Sonny Clark Quintets (Blue Note, 1958 [1976]; reissued as Cool Struttin' Volume 2 on Blue Note, 1983)

With Johnny Coles

- Little Johnny C (Blue Note, 1963 [1964])

With Ted Curson

- Plenty of Horn (Old Town, 1961)

With Art Farmer

- To Sweden with Love (Atlantic, 1964) – with Jim Hall
- Sing Me Softly of the Blues (Atlantic, 1965)

With Don Friedman

- Circle Waltz (Riverside, 1962) – with Scott LaFaro

With Slide Hampton

- Slide Hampton and His Horn of Plenty (Strand, 1959)
- Sister Salvation (Atlantic, 1960)
- Somethin' Sanctified (Atlantic, 1960 [1961])

With Joe Henderson

- Page One (Blue Note, 1963)
- Our Thing (Blue Note, 1963 [1964])

With Freddie Hubbard

- Blue Spirits (Blue Note, 1964 [1967])
- The Night of the Cookers: Live at Club la Marchal, Volume 1 (Blue Note, 1965)
- The Night of the Cookers: Live at Club la Marchal, Volume 2 (Blue Note, 1965 [1966])

With Steve Kuhn

- 1960 (PJL, 1960 [2005]) – with Scott LaFaro
- The Country and Western Sound of Jazz Pianos (Dauntless, 1963) – with Toshiko Akiyoshi
- Three Waves (Contact, 1966) – with Steve Swallow
- Sing Me Softly of the Blues (Venus, 1997) – with George Mraz

With Scott LaFaro

- Pieces of Jade (Resonance, 1961 [2009])

With Booker Little

- Booker Little and Friend (Bethlehem, 1961)

With Charles Lloyd

- Of Course, of Course (Columbia, 1965)
- Nirvana (Columbia, 1962, 1964–65 [1965])
- Live at Slugs' (Resonance, 1965 [2014])

With Jackie McLean

- New Soil (Blue Note, 1959)
- Bluesnik (Blue Note, 1961 [1962])

With Helen Merrill and Dick Katz

- The Feeling Is Mutual (Milestone, 1965 [1967])

With J.R. Monterose

- The Message (Jaro, 1959 [1960])

With Sonny Rollins

- A Night at the Village Vanguard (Blue Note, 1957)
- St Thomas: Sonny Rollins Trio in Stockholm 1959 (Dragon, 1959 [1984])
- Oleo (Jazz Hour, 1959 [1992])

With George Russell

- The Outer View (Riverside, 1962)

With Tony Scott

- Gypsy (Signature, 1959)
- Golden Moments (Muse, 1959 [1982]) – with Bill Evans and Jimmy Garrison
- I'll Remember (Muse, 1959 [1982])

With Paul Serrano

- Blues Holiday (Riverside, 1960 [1961]) – with Cannonball Adderley a.o.
