= Rocky Boyd =

American musician

- Also known as: Rocky Boyd
- Born: John Erskine Boyd; 1936 (age 89–90); Boston
- Genres: Hard bop
- Instrument: tenor saxophone
- Label: Jazztime Records

John Erskine "Rocky" Boyd (Boston, 1936) is an American jazz saxophonist.

== Biography ==
He studied at the South End Music School, Berklee and the Boston Conservatory. Interested in jazz, he moved to New York City in 1958 where he continued his studies while playing at jazz clubs. He played his first date at the Five Spot. Before long, he was working with Johnny Griffin, Philly Joe Jones and Pete LaRoca. Later he replaced Stanley Turrentine in the Max Roach Quintet and also took Hank Mobley's place in the Miles Davis Quintet for three months, after he left in 1961. However, Boyd never recorded in studio with Davis, and in early 1962 he went on the road with the Philly Joe Jones Quintet. His only known recording is Ease It, recorded in 1961 for Jazztime Records.

While in New York City, he lived together with drummer Sunny Murray whom, in a 2003 interview, recalls: "[He] sort of began my career... he was hot, very hot at that period. He was responsible for bringing Sam Rivers into the music, Tony Williams into the music [...]. He helped me begin, and he was very encouraging of me in my studies, as we were living together downtown."

It is believed that Boyd died circa 1980.
