= The Kenny Dorham Memorial Album =

The Arrival of Kenny Dorham

Studio album by Kenny Dorham
- Released: May 1960
- Recorded: January 10, 1960; New York City
- Genre: Jazz, bebop
- Length: 41:55
- Label: Jaro JAM 5007; Xanadu; Xanadu 125 (reissue)
- Producer: Don Schlitten

Kenny Dorham chronology
| Quiet Kenny (1959) | The Arrival of Kenny Dorham (1960) | Jazz Contemporary (1960) |

The Arrival of Kenny Dorham is a jazz studio album by Kenny Dorham, recorded and release in 1960. Initially released by Jaro Records, it would be reissued on the Xanadu label in 1975 as The Kenny Dorham Memorial Album with a different artwork.

== Reception ==
The Allmusic review by Scott Yanow stated: "The straight-ahead music includes features for Davis and Warren, but Dorham consistently takes honors".

Professional ratings
Review scores
| Source | Rating |
|---|---|
| Allmusic | 3/5 stars |
| The Rolling Stone Jazz Record Guide | 3/5 stars |
| The Penguin Guide to Jazz Recordings | 3/4 stars |

== Track listing ==
1. "Stage West" - 8:20
2. "I'm an Old Cowhand" - 4:09
3. "Song of Delilah" - 4:25
4. "Butch's Blues" - 3:41
5. "Stella by Starlight" - 5:01
6. "Lazy Afternoon" - 3:10
7. "Turbo" - 3:44
8. "When Sunny Gets Blue" - 4:36
9. "Six Bits" - 4:45

== Personnel ==
- Kenny Dorham - trumpet
- Charles Davis - baritone sax
- Tommy Flanagan - piano
- Butch Warren - bass
- Buddy Enlow - drums
