= Last Chorus =

Studio album by Ernie Henry
- Released: 1958
- Recorded: August 30 and October 9, 1956, September 15 & 30, and November 13, 1957; Reeves Sound Studios, New York City
- Genre: Jazz
- Length: 44:53
- Label: Riverside; RLP 12-266
- Producer: Orrin Keepnews

Ernie Henry chronology
| Seven Standards and a Blues (1957) | Last Chorus (1958) | 2 Horns / 2 Rhythm (1957) |

Last Chorus is a posthumous album by American jazz saxophonist Ernie Henry featuring tracks recorded in 1956 and 1957 for the Riverside label.

== Reception ==
Professional ratings
Review scores
| Source | Rating |
|---|---|
| Allmusic | 4/5 stars |
| The Penguin Guide to Jazz Recordings | 3/4 stars |

Allmusic awarded the album 4 stars with Scott Yanow stating "Overall, the music is fine and, surprisingly, does not have an unfinished air about it. It does make one wish that Ernie Henry had taken better care of his health, as he was just beginning to develop a sound of his own".

== Track listing ==
1. "Autumn Leaves" (Joseph Kosma, Johnny Mercer, Jacques Prévert) - 3:15
2. "Beauty and the Blues" (Benny Golson) - 6:28
3. "All the Things You Are" (Oscar Hammerstein II, Jerome Kern) - 7:49
4. "Melba's Tune" (Melba Liston) - 2:41
5. "S'posin'" [alternate take] (Paul Denniker, Andy Razaf) - 4:54 - from 2 Horns/2 Rhythm
6. "Ba-Lue Bolivar Ba-Lues-Are" [excerpt] (Thelonious Monk) - 6:58 - from Monk's Brilliant Corners album
7. "Like Someone in Love" [alternate take] (Johnny Burke, Jimmy Van Heusen) - 4:40 - from Seven Standards and a Blues
8. "Cleo's Chant" [alternate take] (Ernie Henry) - 8:31 - from Presenting Ernie Henry
- Recorded at Reeves Sound Studios in New York City on August 30, 1956 (track 8), October 9, 1956 (track 6), September 15, 1957 (tracks 1–4), September 30, 1957 (track 7) and November 13, 1957 (track 5)
- The Fresh Sound CD The Last Sessions adds the octet track Stablemates to the 3 octet and 1 quintet tracks and combines them with the complete Seven Standards and a Blues album.

== Personnel ==
- Ernie Henry - alto saxophone
- Lee Morgan (tracks 1–4) - Kenny Dorham (Tracks 5 & 8) trumpet
- Melba Liston - trombone (tracks 1, 2 & 4)
- Benny Golson (tracks 1, 2 & 4), Sonny Rollins mostly ensemble (track 6) - tenor saxophone
- Cecil Payne - baritone saxophone (tracks 1, 2 & 4)
- Kenny Drew (track 8), Wynton Kelly (tracks 1–4 & 7), Thelonious Monk (track 6) - piano
- Paul Chambers (tracks 1–4), Eddie Mathias (track 5), Oscar Pettiford (track 6), Wilbur Ware (tracks 7 & 8) - bass
- G. T. Hogan (track 5), Philly Joe Jones (tracks 1–4 & 7), Max Roach (track 6), Art Taylor (track 8) - drums
