= 2 Horns / 2 Rhythm =

Studio album by Kenny Dorham
- Released: 1957
- Recorded: November 13 & December 2, 1957
- Genre: Jazz
- Length: 42:17
- Label: Riverside
- Producer: Orrin Keepnews

Kenny Dorham chronology
Jazz Contrasts (1957)	2 Horns / 2 Rhythm (1957)	This Is the Moment! (1958)

Ernie Henry chronology
Last Chorus (1958)	2 Horns / 2 Rhythm (1957)

2 Horns / 2 Rhythm is an album by American jazz trumpeter Kenny Dorham, featuring performances with Ernie Henry. It was recorded in 1957 and released on Riverside Records. This was Henry's last recording session.

== Reception ==
Professional ratings
Review scores
Source	Rating
AllMusic	4/5 stars
The Penguin Guide to Jazz Recordings	3/4 stars

The AllMusic review by Scott Yanow awarded the album four stars and stated "The sparse setting (unusual for a Dorham session) works quite well".

== Track listing ==
All tracks are written by Kenny Dorham, except where noted.

No.	Title	Length
1.	"Lotus Blossom" (Dorham, Sam Coslow, Arthur Johnston)	5:24
2.	"'Sposin'" (Paul Denniker, Andy Razaf)	6:15
3.	"Soon" (George Gershwin, Ira Gershwin)	2:58
4.	"Is It True What They Say About Dixie?" (Irving Caesar, Sammy Lerner, Gerald Marks)	4:42
5.	"The End of a Love Affair" (Edward Redding)	4:28
6.	"I'll Be Seeing You" (Sammy Fain, Irving Kahal)	4:24
7.	"Noose Bloos"	6:38
8.	"Jazz-Classic"	3:14
9.	"'Sposin'" (alternate take included on CD reissue, Denniker, Razaf)	4:49

Recorded in New York City on November 13 (tracks 1–3, 5–7 & 9) and December 2 (tracks 4 & 8), 1957

== Personnel ==
- Kenny Dorham – trumpet, piano (track 3)
- Ernie Henry – alto saxophone
- Eddie Mathias (tracks 1–3, 5–7 & 9), Wilbur Ware (tracks 4 & 8) – bass
- G.T. Hogan – drums
