= Betty Glamann =

American jazz musician

Betty Glamann Voorhees (May 21, 1923 – September 3, 1990) was an American jazz harpist. She was born in Wellington, Kansas.

Glamann learned to play harp at the age of ten. She attended a conservatory and was the harpist for the Baltimore Symphony Orchestra for three years. She played with Spike Jones in 1948, founded the Smith-Glamann Quintet in 1955, played with Duke Ellington and Marian McPartland around 1955 and then with Oscar Pettiford during 1957–58. With Kenny Dorham's band she recorded the album Jazz Contrasts in 1957. In 1958, she was involved in a Michel Legrand recording session with John Coltrane and Miles Davis; she played with Eddie Costa in 1958 and with the Modern Jazz Quartet in 1960.

== Discography ==
=== As leader/co-leader ===
- Poinciana (with Rufus Smith (as Smith-Glamann Quintet) Bethlehem, 1955)
- Swinging on a Harp (Mercury, 1957)
- Christmas Fantasy (Vicson Music, 1967)

=== As sidewoman ===
- Kenny Dorham, Jazz Contrasts (Riverside, 1957)
- Duke Ellington, A Drum Is a Woman (Columbia, 1957)
- Johnny Lytle, People & Love (Milestone, 1973)
- Marian McPartland, After Dark (Capitol, 1955)
- Michel Legrand, Legrand Jazz (Columbia, 1958)
- Michel Legrand, Michel Legrand Meets Miles Davis (Philips, 1970)
- Modern Jazz Quartet, Third Stream Music (Atlantic, 1960)
- Oscar Pettiford, The Oscar Pettiford Orchestra in Hi-Fi Volume Two (ABC-Paramount, 1958)
