= Basra (album) =

Studio album by Pete La Roca
- Released: October 1965
- Recorded: May 19, 1965
- Studio: Van Gelder (Englewood Cliffs)
- Genre: Jazz
- Length: 40:43
- Label: Blue Note; BST 84205
- Producer: Alfred Lion

Pete La Roca chronology
Basra (1965)	Turkish Women at the Bath (1967)

Basra is the debut album by drummer Pete La Roca, recorded in 1965 and released on the Blue Note label.

== Background and recording ==
Bassist Steve Swallow recounted that he and La Roca had taken LSD prior to traveling to recording engineer Rudy Van Gelder's New Jersey studio for the session. He also said that Van Gelder threatened to end the session after pianist Steve Kuhn started manually plucking the piano strings.

== Reception ==
The Allmusic review by Scott Yanow stated: "It is strange to realize that drummer Pete La Roca only led two albums during the prime years of his career, for this CD reissue of his initial date is a classic".

Professional ratings
Review scores
Source	Rating
Allmusic	4.5/5 stars
The Penguin Guide to Jazz Recordings	3.5/4 stars
Down Beat	3/5 stars

== Track listing ==
All compositions by Pete La Roca except as noted

Basra track listing
No.	Title	Length
1.	"Malagueña" (Ernesto Lecuona)	9:01
2.	"Candu"	6:45
3.	"Tears Come from Heaven"	5:00
4.	"Basra"	9:58
5.	"Lazy Afternoon" (John La Touche and Jerome Moross)	5:31
6.	"Eiderdown" (Steve Swallow)	4:28

== Personnel ==
- Pete La Roca - drums
- Joe Henderson - tenor saxophone
- Steve Kuhn - piano
- Steve Swallow - bass
