= This Is the Moment! =

This Is the Moment! Kenny Dorham Sings and Plays

Studio album by Kenny Dorham
- Released: November 1958
- Recorded: July 7 & August 15, 1958
- Studio: Reeves Sound Studios; New York City
- Genre: Jazz
- Length: 37:40
- Label: Riverside; RLP 12-275
- Producer: Orrin Keepnews

Kenny Dorham chronology
2 Horns / 2 Rhythm (1957)	This Is the Moment! Kenny Dorham Sings and Plays (1958)	Blue Spring (1959)

This Is the Moment! (subtitled Kenny Dorham Sings and Plays) is an album by American jazz trumpeter Kenny Dorham featuring performances recorded in 1958 and released on the Riverside label. Dorham sings on the album, for the first and only time in his discography. The album marks the recording debut of pianist Cedar Walton.

== Reception ==
Professional ratings
Review scores
Source	Rating
AllMusic	4/5 stars
The Penguin Guide to Jazz Recordings	3/4 stars

The AllMusic review by Scott Yanow awarded the album 4 stars and stated that "this recording must have surprised most jazz listeners at the time, for trumpeter Kenny Dorham sings on all ten selections... Dorham had an OK voice, musical if not memorable, but the arrangements for these selections are inventive and pleasing."

== Track listing ==
1. "Autumn Leaves" (Joseph Kosma, Jacques Prévert, Johnny Mercer) – 3:09
2. "I Remember Clifford" (Benny Golson, Jon Hendricks) – 2:56
3. "Since I Fell for You" (Buddy Johnson) – 4:16
4. "I Understand" (Kim Gannon, Mabel Wayne) – 4:12
5. "From This Moment On" (Cole Porter) – 4:47
6. "This Is the Moment" (Frederick Hollander, Leo Robin) – 2:37
7. "Angel Eyes" (Earl Brent, Matt Dennis) – 5:26
8. "Where Are You?" (Harold Adamson, Jimmy McHugh) – 4:29
9. "Golden Earrings" (Ray Evans, Jay Livingston, Victor Young) – 2:41
10. "Make Me a Present of You" (Joe Greene) – 3:07

- Recorded by Jack Higgins at Reeves Sound Studios in New York City on July 7, 1958 (tracks 1, 3–4, 6–8 & 10) and May 27 (tracks 2, 5 & 9), 1957

== Personnel ==
- Kenny Dorham – trumpet, vocals
- Curtis Fuller – trombone
- Cedar Walton – piano
- Sam Jones – bass
- G.T. Hogan (tracks 2, 5 & 9), Charlie Persip (tracks 1, 3, 4, 6–8 & 10) – drums
