= Blue Bossa =

Instrumental by Kenny Dorham

from the album Page One
- Released: 1963
- Genre: Jazz
- Composer(s): Kenny Dorham

"Blue Bossa" is an instrumental jazz composition by Kenny Dorham. It was introduced on Joe Henderson's 1963 album Page One. A blend of hard bop and bossa nova, the tune was possibly influenced by Dorham's visit to the Rio de Janeiro Jazz Festival in 1961. The tune has since been recorded numerous times by different artists, making it a jazz standard.

First eight measures of Blue Bossa

== See also ==
- List of post-1950 jazz standards
