= Inta Somethin' =

Live album by Kenny Dorham
- Released: Early March 1962
- Recorded: November 13, 1961
- Venue: The Jazz Workshop, San Francisco
- Genre: Jazz
- Length: 38:31
- Label: Pacific Jazz

Kenny Dorham chronology
Ease It (1961)	Inta Somethin' (1962)	Matador (1962)

Inta Somethin' is a live album by American jazz trumpeter Kenny Dorham featuring performances recorded at The Jazz Workshop in San Francisco in 1961 and released on the Pacific Jazz label.

== Reception ==
Professional ratings
Review scores
Source	Rating
Allmusic	4.5/5 stars
Down Beat	3/5 stars

The Allmusic review awarded the album 4½ stars.

In a three-star review in the May 10, 1962, issue of Down Beat magazine noted jazz critic John. S. Wilson stated: "The most interesting aspect of this disc is the assortment of views it give of McLean going through a phase in which he seems to be absorbing some John Coltrane and Eric Dolphy influences."

== Track listing ==
All compositions by Kenny Dorham except as indicated

1. "Us" - 7:15
2. "It Could Happen to You" (Johnny Burke, Jimmy Van Heusen) - 6:00
3. "Let's Face the Music and Dance (Irving Berlin) - 6:06
4. "No Two People" (Frank Loesser) - 6:59
5. "Lover Man" (Jimmy Davis, Ram Ramirez, James Sherman) - 5:01
6. "San Francisco Beat" - 7:12

== Personnel ==
- Kenny Dorham - trumpet (except tracks 3 and 5)
- Jackie McLean - alto saxophone (except track 2)
- Walter Bishop Jr. - piano
- Leroy Vinnegar - bass
- Art Taylor - drums
