= Earl Coleman (singer) =

American singer (1925–1995)

- Born: August 12, 1925; Port Huron, Michigan, U.S.
- Died: July 12, 1995 (aged 69) New York City, U.S.
- Genres: Jazz, vocal jazz
- Occupation: Singer
- Years active: 1939–1995

Earl Coleman (August 12, 1925 – July 12, 1995) was an American jazz singer.

Coleman was born in Port Huron, Michigan, United States. As a child, he lived with his mother, grandmother, aunt, and step-grandfather.

After moving to Indianapolis in 1939, he sang with Ernie Fields and Bardu Ali. Coleman joined the Jay McShann band in 1943 and later sang with Earl Hines, the Billy Eckstine Orchestra, and King Kolax. Coleman then went with McShann to California and recorded with Charlie Parker, Fats Navarro, and Max Roach in 1948. In 1954, Coleman worked with Gene Ammons and recorded with Art Farmer and Gigi Gryce. In 1956, Coleman was with Sonny Rollins.

By 1960, Coleman was recording as a leader and performed with Gerald Wilson. In 1962, Coleman was with Don Byas in Paris, France, and in the mid-'60s with Billy Taylor and Frank Foster. By 1980–86, Coleman was recording with organist Shirley Scott.

Coleman died of cardiac arrest in New York City, on July 12, 1995, aged 69.

== Discography ==
=== As leader ===
- Earl Coleman Returns (Prestige, 1956)
- Love Songs (Atlantic, 1968)
- A Song for You (Xanadu, 1978)
- There's Something About an Old Love (Xanadu, 1983)
- Stardust (Stash, 1984)

=== As sideman ===
With Etta Jones

- Sugar (Muse, 1989)

With Sonny Rollins

- Tour de Force (Prestige, 1956)

With Charlie Parker

- Singing Dark Shadows on The Charlie Parker Quartet (Dial 1014, 1948)
