= Ernie Henry =

American jazz saxophonist (1926–1957)

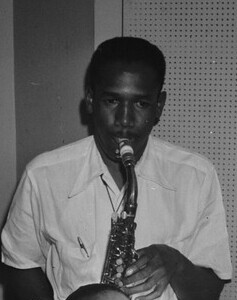
- Ernie Henry playing in Tadd Dameron's band

Background information
- Born: September 3, 1926
- Died: December 29, 1957 (aged 31)
- Genres: Jazz
- Occupation: Musician
- Instrument: Saxophone
- Years active: 1948–1957
- Label: Riverside

Ernie Henry (born Ernest Albert Henry, September 3, 1926 – December 29, 1957) was an American jazz saxophonist.

Henry played in the late 1940s with Tadd Dameron, Fats Navarro, Charlie Ventura, Max Roach, and was a key member of Dizzy Gillespie's big band. Between 1950 and 1951, Henry performed in the band of Illinois Jacquet while seeking freelance performance opportunities. Henry later returned to play with Thelonious Monk (1956), Charles Mingus, Kenny Dorham, Kenny Drew, Wynton Kelly, Wilbur Ware, Art Taylor, Philly Joe Jones and Gillespie again (1956–57). He recorded three albums as a leader for the Riverside label shortly before his death at the end of 1957.

Henry died in his sleep, aged 31. A heroin overdose was alleged, but it is known that he suffered from unusually high blood pressure and suffered ill health.

== Discography ==
- Presenting Ernie Henry (Riverside, 1956)
- Seven Standards and a Blues (Riverside, 1957)
- Last Chorus (Riverside, 1957)
- 2 Horns / 2 Rhythm (Riverside, 1957) with Kenny Dorham

=== As sideman ===
With Matthew Gee

- Jazz by Gee (Riverside, 1956)

With Dizzy Gillespie

- The Complete RCA Victor Recordings (Bluebird, 1937–1949 [1995]
- Gene Norman Presents Dizzy Gillespie in Concert (GNP Crescendo, 1948)
- Dizzy in Greece (Verve, 1957)
- Birks' Works (Verve, 1957)
- Dizzy Gillespie at Newport (Verve, 1957)

With Thelonious Monk

- Brilliant Corners (Riverside, 1957)

With James Moody

- James Moody and his Modernists (Blue Note 1952)

With Fats Navarro

- Memorial Album (Blue Note 1951 later released on 12 inch LP in 1956 as The Fabulous Fats Navarro)
- Memorial (Savoy 1955)

== See also ==
- List of jazz saxophonists
