= Kenny Dorham =

American jazz trumpeter (1924–1972)

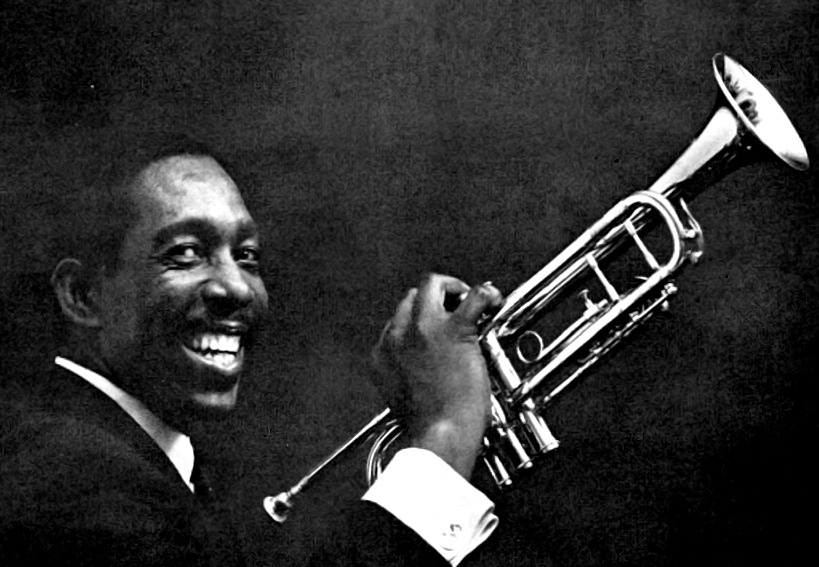
- Dorham in a DownBeat advertisement

Background information
- Born: McKinley Howard Dorham; August 30, 1924; Fairfield, Texas, U.S.
- Died: December 5, 1972 (aged 48) New York City, U.S.
- Genres: Jazz, bebop, mainstream jazz, hard bop
- Occupations: Musician, bandleader, composer
- Instruments: Trumpet, vocals

McKinley Howard "Kenny" Dorham (August 30, 1924 – December 5, 1972) was an American jazz trumpeter, composer, and occasional singer. Dorham's talent is frequently lauded by critics and other musicians, but he never received the kind of attention or public recognition from the jazz establishment that many of his peers did. For this reason, writer Gary Giddins said that Dorham's name has become "virtually synonymous with 'underrated'."

Dorham also composed the bossa nova jazz standard "Blue Bossa", which was first recorded by his associate Joe Henderson.

== Biography ==
Dorham was born in Fairfield, Texas. He began learning piano as a child. Attending L.C. Anderson High School in Austin, Texas, he learned saxophone and trumpet. He studied chemistry and physics at Wiley College before joining the United States Army. He moved to Los Angeles to pursue music after his discharge.

During his final years, Dorham suffered from kidney disease, from which he died on December 5, 1972, aged 48.

== Career ==
Dorham was one of the most active bebop trumpeters. Early in his career, he played in the big bands of Lionel Hampton, Billy Eckstine, Dizzy Gillespie, and Mercer Ellington, and in Charlie Parker's quintet. He joined Parker's band in December 1948. He was a charter member of the original cooperative the Jazz Messengers. He also recorded as a sideman with Thelonious Monk and Sonny Rollins, and he replaced Clifford Brown in the Max Roach Quintet after Brown's death in 1956. In addition to sideman work, Dorham led his own groups, including the Jazz Prophets (formed shortly after Art Blakey took over the Jazz Messengers name). The Jazz Prophets, featuring a young Bobby Timmons on piano, bassist Sam Jones, and tenorman J. R. Monterose, with guest Kenny Burrell on guitar, recorded a live album, 'Round About Midnight at the Cafe Bohemia, in 1956 for Blue Note.

Dorham shared a stage with Miles Davis in 1956. According to Davis's biography, after the performance, Jackie McLean "looked me straight in the eye and said, 'Miles, tonight Kenny is playing so beautiful, you sound like an imitation of yourself.'"

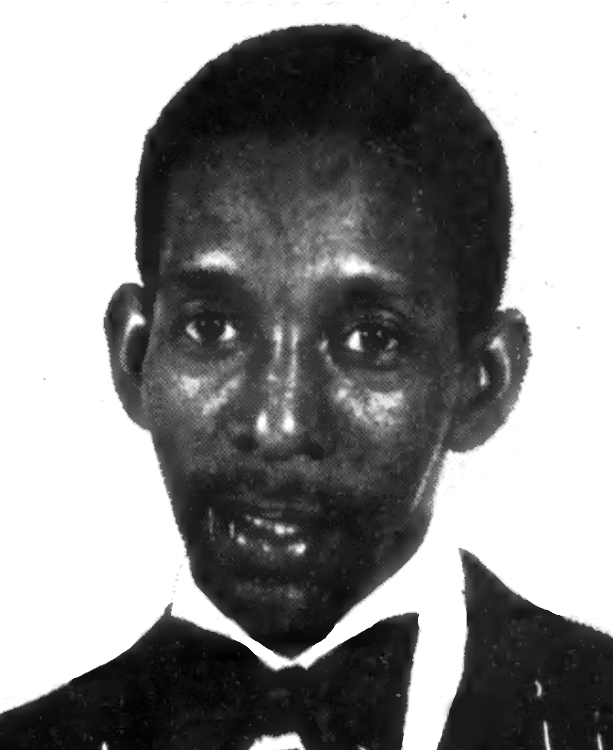
Dorham in an advertisement

In 1963, Dorham added the 26-year-old tenor saxophonist Joe Henderson to his group, which later recorded the album Una Mas. The friendship between the two musicians led to a number of other albums, such as Henderson's Page One, Our Thing, and In 'n Out. Dorham recorded frequently throughout the 1960s for Blue Note and Prestige Records, as leader and as sideman for Henderson, Jackie McLean, Cedar Walton, Andrew Hill, Milt Jackson, and others.

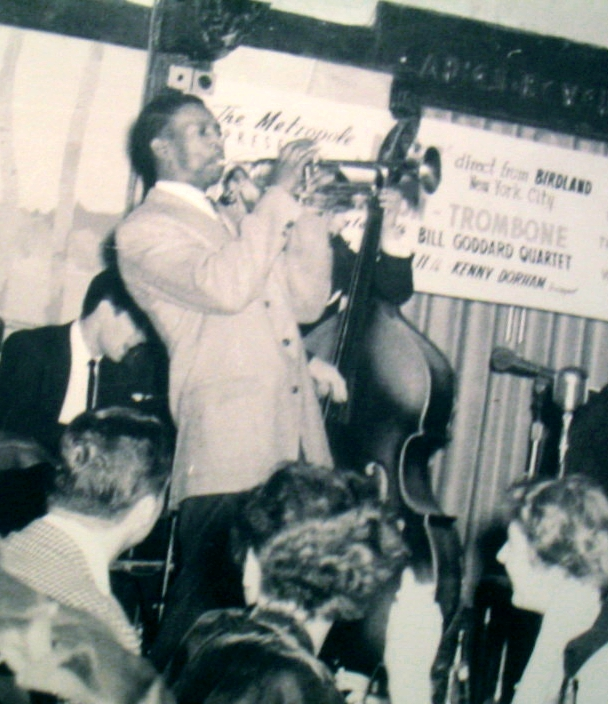
Dorham at Birdland in 1954

Dorham's later quartet consisted of some well-known jazz musicians: Tommy Flanagan (piano), Paul Chambers (double bass), and Art Taylor (drums). Their recording debut was Quiet Kenny for Prestige's New Jazz label, an album which featured mostly ballads. An earlier quartet featuring Dorham as co-leader with alto saxophone player Ernie Henry had released an album together under the name "Kenny Dorham/Ernie Henry Quartet." They produced the album 2 Horns / 2 Rhythm for Riverside Records in 1957, with double bassist Eddie Mathias and drummer G.T. Hogan. In 1990, the album was re-released on CD under the name "Kenny Dorham Quartet featuring Ernie Henry".

=== Other work ===
From 1958-59, Dorham taught at the Lenox School of Jazz. He composed music for the scores for Les Liaisons Dangereuses and Un Témoin dans la Ville. Dorham wrote music criticism for Downbeat in the mid-1960s and early 1970s.

== Legacy ==
Ron Wynn wrote of Dorham, "A legendary jazz trumpeter, [he] had a deeply moving, pure tone on trumpet; his sound was clear, sharp, and piercing, especially during ballads. He could spin out phrases and lines, but when he slowly and sweetly played the melody, it was an evocative event."

In 2019, Dorham was honored in Austin, Texas, where he attended L.C. Anderson High School, with a public mural created by artist Jonathan "Chaka" Mahone as part of the City of Austin's TEMPO 2D public art program. Located in East Austin, the mural depicts Dorham with a large sunflower and was described by the project as celebrating the history of Austin and the neighborhood's role as "a beacon for culture".

All five daughters of Dorham attended a tribute concert at the University of Georgia in 2023. A Kenny Dorham Centennial Celebration took place at Jazz at Lincoln Center in 2024. Performers included Bruce Harris, Joe Magnarelli, Jeremy Pelt, Jimmy Owens, Tim Hagans, David Wong, Noriko Ueda, Kenny Washington, Ulysses Owens, Jr., and Joe Farnsworth.

Middle daughter Evette Dorham has taught classes about her father's work for the Swing University program of Jazz at Lincoln Center.

== Discography ==
=== As leader ===
Year recorded	Title	Label	Year released	Personnel/Notes
1946	Blues in Bebop	Savoy Jazz	1998	Quintets, with Dorham (trumpet), Sonny Stitt (alto sax), Bud Powell (piano), Al Hall (bass), Wallace Bishop or Kenny Clarke (drums); also includes early material recorded with Billy Eckstine, Milt Jackson, Charlie Parker and Cecil Payne
1953	Kenny Dorham Quintet	Debut	1954	Quintet, with Dorham (trumpet), Jimmy Heath (tenor and baritone sax), Walter Bishop Jr. (piano), Percy Heath (bass), Kenny Clarke (drums); 10" LP
1955	Afro-Cuban	Blue Note	1955	Nonet, with Dorham (trumpet), J. J. Johnson (trombone), Hank Mobley (tenor sax), Cecil Payne (baritone sax), Horace Silver (piano), Oscar Pettiford (bass), Art Blakey (drums), Carlos "Patato" Valdes (congas), Richie Goldberg (cowbell, three tracks); sextet, with Mobley (tenor sax), Payne (baritone sax), Silver (piano), Percy Heath (bass), Blakey (drums); nonet tracks originally released as a 10" LP in 1955, then reissued as a 12" LP with the sextet tracks in 1957
1956	Kenny Dorham and the Jazz Prophets Vol. 1	ABC-Paramount	1956	Quintet, with Dorham (trumpet), J. R. Monterose (tenor sax), Dick Katz (piano), Sam Jones (bass), Arthur Edghill (drums)
1956	'Round About Midnight at the Cafe Bohemia	Blue Note	1957	With Dorham (trumpet), J. R. Monterose (tenor sax), Bobby Timmons (piano), Kenny Burrell (guitar), Sam Jones (bass), Arthur Edghill (drums); two additional volumes with another 11 tracks released on the Japanese Blue Note label in 1984, and then fully reissued on CD as The Complete 'Round About Midnight At The Cafe Bohemia (Blue Note, 1995)
1957	Jazz Contrasts – with Sonny Rollins	Riverside	1957	With Dorham (trumpet), Sonny Rollins (tenor sax), Hank Jones (piano), Oscar Pettiford (bass), Max Roach (drums), Betty Glamann (harp)
1957	2 Horns/2 Rhythm – with Ernie Henry	Riverside	1957	With Dorham (trumpet, piano on one track), Ernie Henry (alto sax), Eddie Mathias or Wilbur Ware (bass), G. T. Hogan (drums)
1958	This Is the Moment! Kenny Dorham Sings and Plays	Riverside	1958	With Dorham (trumpet, vocal), Curtis Fuller (trombone), Cedar Walton (piano), Charlie Persip or G. T. Hogan (drums)
1959	Blue Spring – with Cannonball Adderley	Riverside	1959	With Dorham (trumpet), Cannonball Adderley (alto sax), David Amram (French horn), Cecil Payne (baritone sax), Cedar Walton (piano), Paul Chambers (bass), Jimmy Cobb or Philly Joe Jones (drums)
1959	Quiet Kenny	Prestige/New Jazz	1960	Quartet, with Dorham (trumpet), Tommy Flanagan (piano), Paul Chambers (bass), Art Taylor (drums); reissued as Kenny Dorham/1959 (Prestige, 1972)
1960	The Arrival of Kenny Dorham	Jaro International	1960	Quintet, with Dorham (trumpet), Charles Davis (baritone sax), Tommy Flanagan (piano), Butch Warren (bass), Buddy Enlow (drums); reissued as The Kenny Dorham Memorial Album (Xanadu, 1976)
1960	Jazz Contemporary	Time	1960	Quintet, with Dorham (trumpet), Charles Davis (baritone sax), Steve Kuhn (piano), Butch Warren (bass), Buddy Enlow (drums)
1960	Showboat	Time	1961	Quintet, with Dorham (trumpet), Jimmy Heath (tenor sax), Kenny Drew (piano), Butch Warren (bass), Buddy Enlow (drums)
1961	Hot Stuff from Brazil	West Wind	1988	With Dorham (trumpet), Curtis Fuller (trombone), Zoot Sims (tenor sax), Ronnie Ball (piano), Ben Tucker (bass), Dave Bailey (drums), Ray Mantilla (percussion), Herbie Mann (flute, one track)
1961	Inta Somethin' – with Jackie McLean	Pacific Jazz	1962	Quintet, with Dorham (trumpet), Jackie McLean (alto sax), Walter Bishop Jr. (piano), Leroy Vinnegar (bass), Art Taylor (drums)
1961	Whistle Stop	Blue Note	1961	Quintet, with Dorham (trumpet), Hank Mobley (tenor sax), Kenny Drew (piano), Paul Chambers (bass), Philly Joe Jones (drums)
1962	Matador	United Artists	1963	Quintet, with Dorham (trumpet), Jackie McLean (alto sax), Bobby Timmons (piano), Teddy Smith (bass), J. C. Moses (drums)
1962	Una Mas	Blue Note	1964	Quintet, with Dorham (trumpet), Joe Henderson (tenor sax), Herbie Hancock (piano), Butch Warren (bass), Tony Williams (drums)
1963	The Flamboyan, Queens, NY, 1963 – with Joe Henderson	Uptown	2009	Quintet, with Dorham (trumpet), Joe Henderson (tenor sax), Ronnie Mathews (piano), Steve Davis (bass), J. C. Moses (drums)
1963	Scandia Skies	SteepleChase	1980	Quintet, with Dorham and Rolf Ericson (trumpet), Tete Montoliu (piano), Niels-Henning Ørsted Pedersen (bass), Alex Riel (drums); reissued, together with Short Story, as Scandia Story (SteepleChase, 1998)
1963	Short Story	SteepleChase	1979	Quintet, with Dorham (trumpet), Allan Botschinsky (flugelhorn), Tete Montoliu (piano), Niels-Henning Ørsted Pedersen (bass), Alex Riel (drums); reissued, together with Scandia Skies, as Scandia Story (SteepleChase, 1998)
1964	Jazz at P. S. 175	Harlem Youth Unlimited	1964	Quintet, with Dorham (trumpet; misspelled as "Durham"), Barry Harris (piano), Julian Euell (bass), Albert Heath (drums)
1964	Trompeta Toccata	Blue Note	1965	Quintet, with Dorham (trumpet), Joe Henderson (tenor sax), Tommy Flanagan (piano), Richard Davis (bass), Albert Heath (drums)
1966	Last But Not Least 1966, Vol. 2	Raretone	1988	Quintet, with Dorham (trumpet), Sonny Red (alto sax), Cedar Walton (piano), John Ore (bass), Hugh Walker (drums); unofficial release
1967	Blue Bossa in the Bronx: live from the Blue Morocco	Resonance	2025	Quintet, with Sonny Red (alto sax), Cedar Walton (piano), Paul Chambers (bass), Denis Charles (drums)
1968	A Trumpet Tribute: A Tribute to Fats Navarro, Clifford Brown and Booker Little	Trip Jazz	1975	Three sextet tracks, with Dorham, Bill Hardman and Richard Williams (trumpet), Lonnie Liston Smith (piano), Peck Morrison (bass), Richard Davis (bass), Walter Perkins (drums); reissued as Trumpet Summit: Live at Club Ruby, 1968 (Fresh Sound, 2005)

=== As sideman ===
With Art Blakey

- The Jazz Messengers at the Cafe Bohemia Volume 1 (Blue Note, 1955) – live
- The Jazz Messengers at the Cafe Bohemia Volume 2 (Blue Note, 1955) – live

With Joe Henderson

- Page One (Blue Note, 1963)
- Our Thing (Blue Note, 1963)
- In 'n Out (Blue Note, 1964)

With Ernie Henry

- Presenting Ernie Henry (Riverside, 1956)
- Last Chorus (Riverside, 1958) – rec. 1956–57

With Milt Jackson

- Roll 'Em Bags (Savoy, 1949)
- Invitation (Riverside, 1962)

With Clifford Jordan

- Starting Time (Jazzland, 1961)
- In the World (Strata-East, 1972) – rec. 1969

With Abbey Lincoln

- That's Him! (Riverside, 1957)
- It's Magic (Riverside, 1958)
- Abbey Is Blue (Riverside, 1959)

With Hank Mobley

- Mobley's 2nd Message (Prestige, 1956)
- Curtain Call (Blue Note, 1957)

With Cecil Payne

- 1956: Patterns of Jazz (Savoy, 1957)
- 1968: Zodiac (Strata-East, 1973)

With Max Roach

- Max Roach + 4 (EmArcy, 1956)
- Jazz in ¾ Time (EmArcy, 1957) – rec. 1956–57
- MAX (Argo, 1958)
- The Max Roach 4 Plays Charlie Parker (EmArcy, 1959) – rec. 1957–58

With Sonny Rollins

- 1954: Moving Out (Prestige, 1956)
- 1956: Rollins Plays for Bird (Prestige, 1957)
- 1956: Sonny Boy (Prestige, 1961)

With Barney Wilen

- Barney (RCA, 1959)
- Un Temoin Dans La Ville (Fontana, 1959)

With others

- Charlie Parker, Swedish Schnapps (Verve, 1958) – compilation
- Toshiko Akiyoshi, Toshiko at Top of the Gate (Nippon Columbia, 1968) – reissued by Denon
- Dave Bailey, Bash! (Jazzline, 1961) - reissued as Tommy Flanagan Trio And Sextet (Onyx/Xanadu, 1973) and under Dorham's name as Osmosis (Black Lion, 1990)
- Andy Bey, Andy and the Bey Sisters (Fontana, 1959) – reissued as Emarcy CD)
- The Birdland Stars, On Tour Vol.1 & 2 (RCA Victor, 1956)
- Rocky Boyd, Ease It (Jazztime, 1961) – reissued as West 42nd Street on Black Lion under Dorham's name
- Kenny Burrell, Kenny Burrell (Blue Note BLP 1543, 1956) – 1 track
- Tadd Dameron, Fontainebleau (Prestige, 1956)
- Lou Donaldson, Quartet/Quintet/Sextet (Blue Note, 1957) – rec. 1952–54
- Matthew Gee, Jazz by Gee (Riverside, 1956)
- Herb Geller, Fire in the West (Jubilee, 1957) – aka That Geller Feller (Fresh Sound, 2003)
- Benny Golson, The Modern Touch (Riverside, 1958) – rec. 1957
- Barry Harris, Bull's Eye! (Prestige, 1968)
- Andrew Hill, Point of Departure (Blue Note, 1965) – rec. 1964
- Harold Land, Eastward Ho! Harold Land in New York (Jazzland, 1960)
- Jazz Artists Guild, Newport Rebels (Candid, 1961)
- Jackie McLean, Vertigo (Blue Note, 1980) – rec. 1959–63
- John Mehegan, Casual Affair (TJ, 1959)
- Gil Mellé, Gil's Guests (Prestige, 1956)
- Helen Merrill, You've Got a Date with the Blues (MetroJazz, 1959)
- Thelonious Monk, Genius of Modern Music: Volume 2 (Blue Note, 1952)
- Oliver Nelson, Meet Oliver Nelson (New Jazz, 1959)
- Oscar Pettiford, The Oscar Pettiford Orchestra in Hi-Fi Volume Two (ABC-Paramount, 1957)
- A. K. Salim, Pretty for the People (Savoy, 1957)
- Horace Silver, Horace Silver and the Jazz Messengers (Blue Note, 1956) – rec. 1954–55
- Cecil Taylor, Hard Driving Jazz (United Artists, 1958) – reissued by Blue Note
- Cedar Walton, Cedar! (Prestige, 1967)
- Randy Weston, Live at the Five Spot (United Artists, 1959) – live
- Phil Woods, Pairing Off (Prestige, 1956)
