= Lou Donaldson discography =

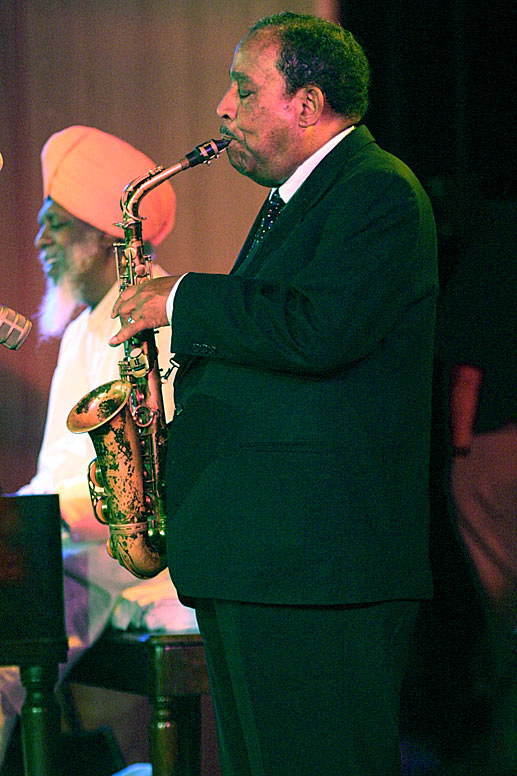
- Donaldson with Dr. Lonnie Smith (organ)
- Studio albums: 50
- Compilation albums: 7

This article presents the discography of the American jazz alto saxophonist Lou Donaldson (1926–2024).

== As leader ==
Recording date	Title	Label	Year released	Notes
1952-06, 1952-11	New Faces New Sounds (Lou Donaldson Quintet/Quartet)	Blue Note BLP 5021	1953	[10" LP]
1953-06	New Faces New Sounds (Lou Donaldson / Clifford Brown Quintet)	Blue Note BLP 5030	1953	[10" LP]
1952-11, 1954-08	Quartet/Quintet/Sextet	Blue Note BLP 1537	1957	
1954-08	Lou Donaldson Sextet, Vol. 2	Blue Note BLP 5055	1954	[10" LP]
1957-01	Wailing With Lou	Blue Note BLP 1545	1957	
1957-06	Swing and Soul	Blue Note BLP 1566	1957	
1957-12	Lou Takes Off	Blue Note BLP 1591	1958	
1958-07	Blues Walk	Blue Note BLP 1593	1958	
1958-12	Light-Foot	Blue Note BLP 4053	1959	
1959-02	LD + 3 with The Three Sounds	Blue Note BLP 4012	1959	
1959-10, 1959-11	The Time Is Right	Blue Note BLP 4025	1960	
1960-02	Sunny Side Up	Blue Note BLP 4036	1961	
1960-07	Midnight Sun	Blue Note/UA LT-1028	1980	
1961-01	Here 'Tis	Blue Note BLP 4066	1961	
1961-04	Gravy Train	Blue Note BLP 4079	1962	
1961-09, 1963-06	A Man with a Horn	Blue Note/EMI 21436	1999	
1962-05	The Natural Soul	Blue Note BLP 4108	1963	
1963-01	Good Gracious!	Blue Note BLP 4125	1964	
1963-07	Signifyin'	Argo LP 724	1963	
1964-01	Possum Head	Argo LP 734	1964	
1964-06	Cole Slaw	Argo LP 747	1964	
1964-12	Rough House Blues	Cadet LPS 768	1965	
1965-06	Musty Rusty	Argo LPS 759	1965	
1965-08	Fried Buzzard	Cadet LPS 842	1970	Live
1965-08	Lou Donaldson at His Best	Cadet LPS 815	1969	This is NOT a "best of/hits" compilation; it is an album of all-new session recordings.
1966-08	Blowing in the Wind	Cadet LPS 789	1967	
1967-01	Sweet Slumber; Reissued as Lush Life (Blue Note BST 84254, 1986)	Blue Note [Japan] GXF 3068	1980	
1967-04	Alligator Bogaloo	Blue Note BLP 4263	1967	
1967-10	Mr. Shing-A-Ling	Blue Note BLP 4271	1968	
1968-03	Midnight Creeper	Blue Note BST 84280	1968	
1968-11	Say It Loud!	Blue Note BST 84299	1969	
1969-04	Hot Dog	Blue Note BST 84318	1969	
1969-08, 1970-01	Everything I Play Is Funky	Blue Note BST 84337	1970	
1970-01, 1970-06	Pretty Things	Blue Note BST 84359	1970	
1970-11	The Scorpion: Live At The Cadillac Club	Blue Note/EMI 31876	1995	Live
1971-07	Cosmos	Blue Note BST 84370	1971	
1972-12	Sophisticated Lou	Blue Note/UA BN-LA 024-G	1973	
1973-04	Sassy Soul Strut	Blue Note/UA BN-LA 109-F	1973	
1974-03	Sweet Lou	Blue Note/UA BN-LA 259-G	1974	
1976-04	A Different Scene	Cotillion SD 9905	1976	
1976-12	Color as a Way of Life	Cotillion SD 9915	1977	
1981-01	Sweet Poppa Lou	Muse MR 5247	1981	
1981-07	Forgotten Man	Timeless SJP 153	1982	
1981-07	Back Street	Muse MR 5292	1982	
1984-01	Live in Bologna	Timeless SJP 202	1986	Live
1990-12	Play the Right Thing	Milestone MCD 9190	1991	
1992-04	Birdseed	Milestone MCD 9198	1992	
1993-07	Caracas	Milestone MCD 9217	1993	
1994-08	Sentimental Journey	Columbia CK 66790	1995	
1999-11	Relaxing at Sea: Live on the QE2	Chiaroscuro CRD 366	2000	Live

Compilations

- Ha' Mercy (Cadet 2CA 60007, 1971) [2LP]
- The Best of Lou Donaldson: Signifyin' (Affinity/Charly ARC-509, 1991)
- The Best of Lou Donaldson, Volume 1: (1957–1967) (Blue Note/EMI 27298, 1993)
- The Righteous Reed! The Best of Poppa Lou (Blue Note/EMI 30721, 1994) – rec. 1967–73
- The Best of Lou Donaldson, Vol. II: The Blue Note Years (Blue Note/EMI 37745, 1996) – rec. 1967–70
- Blue Breakbeats (Blue Note/EMI 94709, 1998)
- The Artist Selects (Blue Note/EMI 31434, 2005)

== As co-leader ==
Quartet with Jimmy Smith

- V.A., One Night with Blue Note Volume 3 (Blue Note, 1985)
- V.A., One Night With Blue Note Preserved (Blue Note, 1985)

== As sideman ==
With Art Blakey

- A Night at Birdland Vol. 1 (Blue Note, 1954) [10" LP]
- A Night at Birdland Vol. 2 (Blue Note, 1954) [10"]
- A Night at Birdland Vol. 3 (Blue Note, 1954) [10"]

With Milt Jackson

- Milt Jackson: Wizard of the Vibes (Blue Note, 1952) [10"] – rec. 1948–52
- All Star Bags (Blue Note, 1976) [2LP] – compilation/rec. 1952–57

With Thelonious Monk

- Genius of Modern Music: Volume 1 (Blue Note, 1951) [10"] – rec. 1947
- Genius of Modern Music: Volume 2 (Blue Note, 1952) [10"] – rec. 1951–52

With Jimmy Smith

- A Date with Jimmy Smith Volume One (Blue Note, 1957)
- A Date with Jimmy Smith Volume Two (Blue Note, 1957)
- Jimmy Smith at the Organ Vol. One (Blue Note, 1957)
- Jimmy Smith at the Organ Vol. Two (Blue Note, 1957)
- House Party (Blue Note, 1958)
- The Sermon! (Blue Note, 1959) – rec. 1957–58
- Rockin' the Boat (Blue Note, 1963)
- Confirmation (Blue Note, 1979) – rec. 1958
- Cool Blues (Blue Note, 1980) – live rec. 1958
- Jimmy Smith Trio + LD (Blue Note, 1985) – rec. 1957

With others

- Gene Ammons, All Star Sessions (Prestige, 1956) – rec. 1950–55
- Clifford Brown, Memorial Album (Blue Note, 1956) – rec. 1953
- Junior Mance, Mance (Chiaroscuro, 2000) (also with Etta Jones) – rec. 1998
- Horace Silver, Horace Silver Quartet With Lou Donaldson: Live In New York 1953 (Solar, 2014) – live/rec. 1953
