= The Best Things in Life Are Free (Ray Henderson song) =

1927 popular song by Buddy DeSylva, Lew Brown, and Ray Henderson

- Sheet music, 1927

Song
- Published: 1927 by De Sylva, Brown and Henderson
- Genre: Show tunes
- Composer: Ray Henderson
- Lyricists: Buddy DeSylva and Lew Brown

"The Best Things in Life Are Free" is a popular song written by the songwriting team of Buddy DeSylva and Lew Brown (lyrics) and Ray Henderson (music) for the 1927 musical Good News. It enjoyed a revival during the period from 1947 to 1950, when it was covered by many artists.

On January 1, 2023, the composition entered the public domain in the US.

== Lyrics ==
There are so many kinds of riches,

And only one of them is gold.

Though wealth you miss,
Remember this :

Worthwhile things cannot be bought or sold.

Refrain
The moon belongs to everyone—

The best things in life are free

The stars belong to everyone

They gleam there for you and me

The flowers in spring
the robins that sing
The sunbeams that shine
They're yours!—They're mine!
And love can come to everyone—

The best things in life are free

== Recordings ==
The song first enjoyed chart success in 1927 with the recordings by George Olsen and Frank Black.

Jo Stafford recorded the song on November 7, 1947, bringing the song to a new genre. She enjoyed chart success with the song reaching the No. 21 spot in 1948. Dinah Shore also covered the song in 1948; her single reached peaked at No. 18 on the charts.

== Other recordings ==
- The Ink Spots covered the song in 1947; their version reached #10 on the Billboard U.S. R&B chart.
- Kay Starr recorded the song in 1947 and it was included in the album The Uncollected Kay Starr in the 1940s - 1947.
- Frank Sinatra sang a portion of the song in 1949.
- Les Paul and Mary Ford (1954). The song was included on their 1955 album Les and Mary.
- Michael Holliday for his album Happy Holliday (1961)
- Gordon MacRae (1956)
- Sonny Stitt (1957) in his album Sonny Stitt with the New Yorkers
- Saxophonist Hank Mobley played the song on the 1961 album Workout.
- Sam Cooke sang the song on the 1964 live album Sam Cooke at the Copa.
- Saxophonist Lou Donaldson played the song on the 1957 album Quartet/Quintet/Sextet and the 1970 live album Fried Buzzard.
- Bing Crosby included the song on his 1975 album That's What Life Is All About.
- Victoria Jackson on her 1994 children's album Ukelele Lady.
- Michael Feinstein included the song in the album Romance on Film, Romance on Broadway (2000)

== In film and television ==
The song was included in both film adaptations of Good News, in 1930 and 1947; the 1947 film featured the song several times, sung by June Allyson, Mel Tormé, and Peter Lawford, who sang it in French.

The film The Best Things in Life Are Free (1956), about DeSylva, Brown and Henderson, was named after the song and featured it with a version sung by Sheree North (dubbed by Eileen Wilson).

In an episode of The Muppet Show, a group of kleptomaniac prairie dogs sang the song as they looted the set.

The song was sung by Bonnie Bedelia in the 1969 Sydney Pollack film They Shoot Horses, Don't They?

Musical theater star Robert Morse sang and danced to the song in the Mad Men (season 7) episode "Waterloo" (May 25, 2014), in a dream sequence set after his character Bertram Cooper has died.

Also featured in the film Nanny McPhee Returns during the piglet feeding in the beginning of the movie. Sung by Bing Crosby.

Season 2 of The White Lotus features the song twice. In episode 2, "Italian Dream," Beatrice Grannò performs it at a piano, in character as "Mia." Sam Cooke's version plays over the final scene of episode 7, season finale "Arrivederci."

The 2007 video game BioShock makes use of the Ink Spots cover throughout its narrative.
