= Roxy Theatre (Greenville, North Carolina) =

Theater in Greenville, North Carolina

Coordinates: 35°36′37″N 77°22′47″W

The theater owner should not be confused with politician from Virginia John Warner

The Roxy Theatre is a theater building built in Greenville, North Carolina, in 1938. It served African American audiences and succeeded the Plaza Theatre in the area known as The Block. Both theaters were owned by John W. Warner, a theater owner and filmmaker. He made the local film Pitch a Boogie Woogie with his brother from New York City. The theater closed in 1972 and became a community arts center.

The art deco theater is at 629 Albemarle Avenue. In 1979 the songwriter William Myles Nobles bought it. Cinema Treasures has an entry and photograph of it. East Carolina University has a 2012 photograph of the theater. .The theater building is now home to the Greenville Theater Arts Center (GTAC). In 2021, GTAC hosted a Juneteenth celebration at the theater.
