= Midnight Sun (Lou Donaldson album) =

Studio album by Lou Donaldson
- Released: 1980
- Recorded: July 22, 1960
- Studios: Van Gelder Studio, Englewood Cliffs, NJ
- Genre: Jazz
- Length: 34:36
- Labels: Blue Note; LT 1028
- Producer: Alfred Lion

Lou Donaldson chronology
Sunny Side Up (1960)	Midnight Sun (1980)	Here 'Tis (1961)

Alternative cover
- 1980 Japanese LP

Professional ratings
Review scores
Source	Rating
Allmusic	3/5 stars

Midnight Sun is an album by jazz saxophonist Lou Donaldson, recorded for the Blue Note label in 1960, but not released until 1980 and performed by Donaldson with pianist Horace Parlan, bassist Ben Tucker, drummer Al Harewood and congalero Ray Barretto.

== Reception ==
The album was awarded 3 stars in an Allmusic review by Stephen Thomas Erlewine, who states "Midnight Sun is as strong as any of the hard bop records Donaldson released in the early '60s. Part of the reason the quality is so high is the fact his supporting quartet is so strong... Any dedicated Donaldson fan should search for this record; even if it doesn't reach the heights of Blues Walk and Here 'Tis, it still has plenty of fine music.

== Track listing ==
All compositions by Lou Donaldson except as indicated

1. "Candy" (Mack David, Alex Kramer, Joan Whitney) – 6:12
2. "Midnight Sun" (Sonny Burke, Lionel Hampton, Johnny Mercer) – 5:45
3. "Avalon" (Buddy DeSylva, Al Jolson, Vincent Rose) – 5:18
4. "The Squirrel" (Tadd Dameron) – 3:22
5. "Si Si Safronia" – 4:31
6. "Exactly Like You" (Dorothy Fields, Jimmy McHugh) – 5:03
7. "Dog Walk" – 4:25

== Personnel ==
- Lou Donaldson – alto saxophone
- Horace Parlan – piano
- Ben Tucker – bass
- Al Harewood – drums
- Ray Barretto – congas (tracks 1 & 3–7)
