= Peter Bernstein (guitarist) =

American jazz guitarist (born 1967)

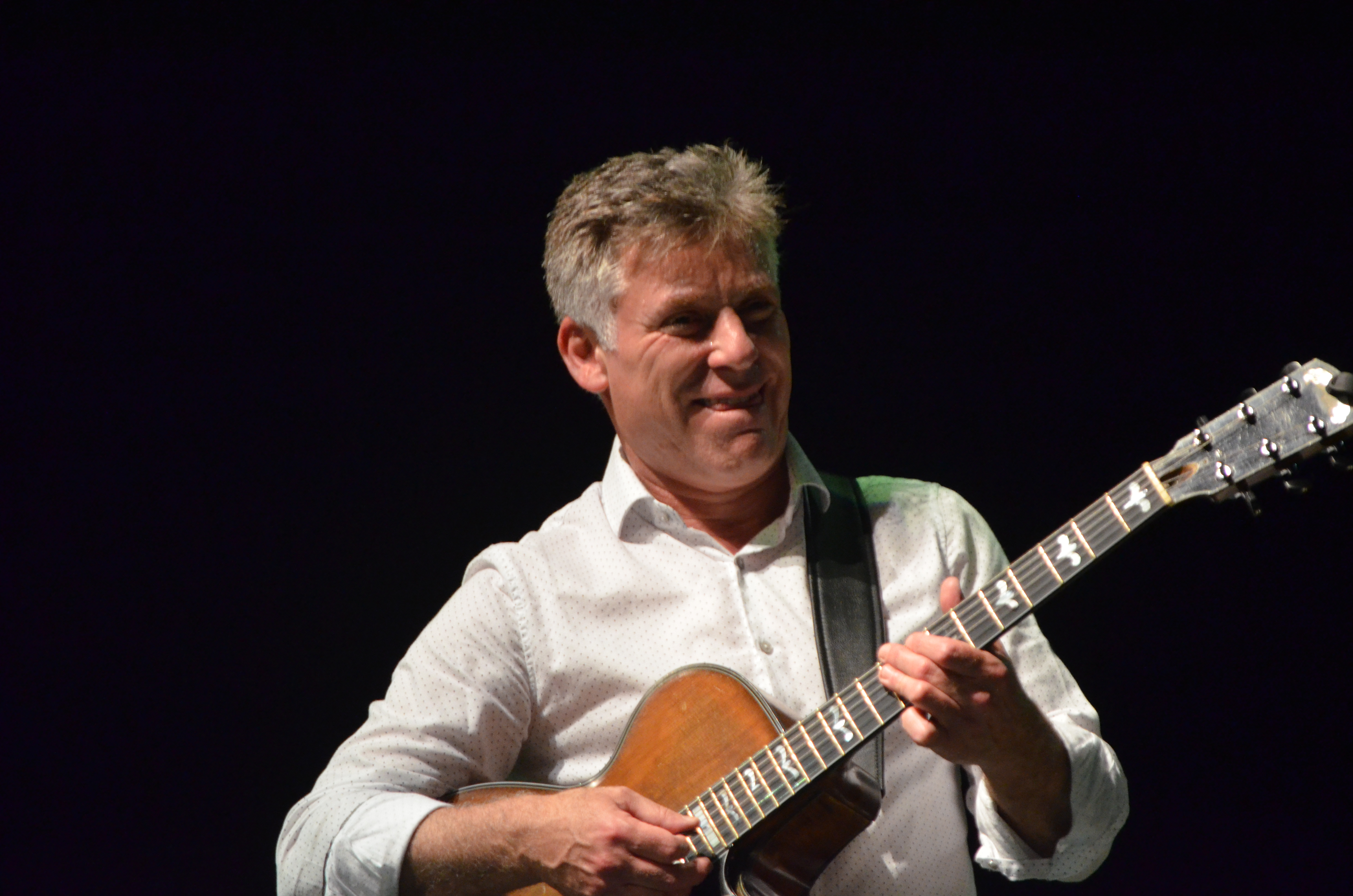
- Peter Bernstein at a jazz festival in San Javier, Spain

Background information
- Born: Peter Andrew Bernstein; September 3, 1967 (age 59); New York City, New York, U.S.
- Genre: Jazz
- Occupation: Musician
- Instrument: Guitar
- Years active: 1990–present
- Labels: Criss Cross; Smoke Sessions
- Website: peterbernsteinmusic.com

Peter Andrew Bernstein (born September 3, 1967) is an American jazz guitarist.

== Biography ==
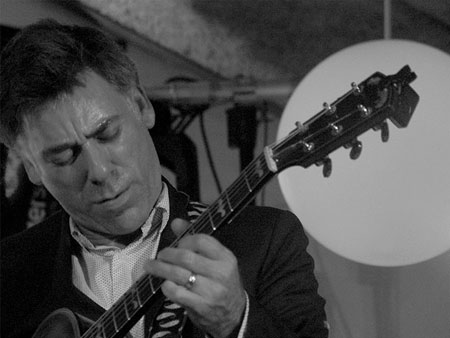
Peter Bernstein with Martin Schack organ trio in 2011

Born in New York City on September 3, 1967, Bernstein began playing piano when he was eight but switched to guitar when he was thirteen, learning the instrument primarily by ear. He studied jazz at Rutgers University with Ted Dunbar, and Kenny Barron.

While a student at the New School in New York City, he met guitarist Jim Hall, who offered him a job performing at the JVC Jazz Festival in 1990. He then appeared on albums with Jesse Davis, Lou Donaldson, Larry Goldings, Michael Hashim, Geoff Keezer, and Melvin Rhyne. He released his first album as a leader with pianist Brad Mehldau. He has also worked with Jimmy Cobb, Tom Harrell, Diana Krall, Lee Konitz, Eric Alexander, Joshua Redman, Dr. Lonnie Smith, and Walt Weiskopf.

In 2008, Bernstein became part of the Blue Note 7, a septet formed that year in honor of the 70th anniversary of Blue Note Records. The group recorded the album Mosaic.

Bernstein plays a Zeidler archtop guitar almost exclusively. The guitar was made in 1981.

== Discography ==
=== As leader ===
- Somethin's Burnin' (Criss Cross, 1994)
- Signs of Life (Criss Cross, 1995)
- Brain Dance (Criss Cross, 1996)
- April in New York (Jardis, 1998)
- Earth Tones with Larry Goldings, Bill Stewart (Criss Cross, 1998)
- We Remember Tal with Gene Bertoncini, Mundell Lowe, Jack Wilkins (J-Curve, 1999)
- Stranger in Paradise (Venus, 2003)
- Heart's Content (Criss Cross, 2003)
- Guitars Alone with Satoshi Inoue (What'sNew, 2003)
- You'll See with the Anniversary Quartet (Cellar Live, 2005)
- In Orbit with Planet Jazz (Sharp Nine, 2006)
- Monk (Xanadu, 2008)
- Peter Bernstein Quartet: Live at Smalls (SmallsLIVE, 2008)
- Live at Smalls with Planet Jazz (Off Minor, 2010)
- Live at Smalls with Larry Goldings, Bill Stewart (SmallsLIVE, 2011)
- Dialogues with Joachim Schoenecker (2012)
- Live at Cory Weeds' Cellar Jazz Club with the Tilden Webb Trio (Cellar Live, 2013)
- Solo Guitar Live at Smalls (SmallsLIVE, 2013)
- Ramshackle Serenade with Larry Goldings, Bill Stewart (Pirouet, 2014)
- Inspired with Rale Micic, John Abercrombie, Lage Lund (ArtistShare, 2016)
- Humanity with the Humanity Quartet (Cellar Live, 2016)
- Let Loose (Smoke Sessions, 2016)
- Signs Live! (Smoke Sessions, 2017)
- Toy Tunes with Larry Goldings, Bill Stewart (Pirouet, 2018)
- What Comes Next (Smoke Sessions, 2020)
- Perpetual Pendulum with Larry Goldings, Bill Stewart (Smoke Sessions, 2022)
- Solid Jackson (Criss Cross, 2023)
- Better Angels (Smoke Sessions, 2024)

=== As a member ===
M.T.B.
With Brad Mehldau and Mark Turner

- Consenting Adults (Criss Cross, 2000) – rec. 1994
- Solid Jackson (Criss Cross, 2024) – rec. 2023

=== As sideman ===
With Eric Alexander

- The Tenor Triangle, Tell It Like It Is (Criss Cross Jazz, 1994) – also with Ralph Lalama and Tad Shull
- Full Range (Criss Cross Jazz, 1995) – rec. 1994
- The Tenor Triangle, Aztec Blues (Criss Cross Jazz, 1997) – rec. 1994
- Alexander the Great (HighNote, 2000) – rec. 1997

With Ralph Bowen

- Soul Proprietor (Criss Cross Jazz, 2001)
- Five (Criss Cross Jazz, 2008)

With Jimmy Cobb

- Only for the Pure of Heart (Fable/Lightyear, 1998)
- Cobb's Groove (Milestone, 2003)
- The Original Mob (Smoke Sessions, 2014)
- This I Dig of You (Smoke Sessions, 2019)

With Jesse Davis

- As We Speak (Concord Jazz, 1992)
- Young at Art (Concord Jazz, 1993)
- First Insight (Concord Jazz, 1998)

With Steve Davis

- Vibe Up! (Criss Cross Jazz, 1998)
- Update (Criss Cross Jazz, 2006)

With Lou Donaldson

- Play the Right Thing (Milestone, 1991)
- Birdseed (Milestone, 1992)
- Caracas (Milestone, 1994)
- Sentimental Journey (Columbia, 1995)

With Don Friedman

- Waltz for Marilyn (Jazz Excursion, 2007)
- Remembering Attila Zoller (Edition Longplay, 2016)

With Larry Goldings

- Intimacy of the Blues (Minor Music, 1991)
- Light Blue (Minor Music, 1992)
- Caminhos Cruzados (Novus, 1994)
- Whatever It Takes (Warner Bros., 1995)
- Big Stuff (Warner Bros., 1996)
- Moonbird (Palmetto, 1999)
- As One (Palmetto, 2000)
- Sweet Science (Palmetto, 2002)
- Long Story Short (Sticky Mack, 2007)

With Jim Hall

- Jim Hall and Friends Live at Town Hall Vol. 1 (Musicmasters, 1991)
- Jim Hall and Friends Live at Town Hall Vol. 2 (Musicmasters, 1991)

With Ryan Kisor

- Battle Cry (Criss Cross Jazz, 1998) – rec. 1997
- Donna Lee (Videoarts Music, 2004) – rec. 2003

With Mike LeDonne

- Waltz for an Urbanite (Criss Cross Jazz, 1996)
- Smokin' Out Loud (Savant, 2004)
- On Fire (Savant, 2007)
- The Groover (Savant, 2009)
- Keep the Faith (Savant, 2011)
- I Love Music (Savant, 2014)
- AwwlRIGHT! (Savant, 2015)
- That Feelin' (Savant, 2016)
- From the Heart (Savant, 2018)
- It's All Your Fault (Savant, 2021)
- Wonderful! (Savant, 2024)

With David "Fathead" Newman

- Life (HighNote, 2007)
- The Blessing (HighNote, 2009)

With Alvin Queen

- I Ain't Looking at You (Enja, 2006)
- Mighty Long Way (Enja, 2009)

With Joshua Redman

- Freedom in the Groove (Warner Bros., 1996)
- Momentum (Nonesuch, 2005)

With Melvin Rhyne

- The Legend (Criss Cross Jazz, 1992)
- Boss Organ (Criss Cross Jazz, 1994)
- Stick to the Kick (Criss Cross Jazz, 1995)
- Mel's Spell (Criss Cross Jazz, 1996)
- Kojo (Criss Cross, 1997)
- Classmasters (Criss Cross Jazz, 1999)
- Tomorrow Yesterday Today (Criss Cross Jazz, 2003)

With Sonny Rollins

- Road Shows Vol. 3 (Doxy/Okeh, 2014) – live rec. 2001–2012
- Road Shows Vol. 4: Holding the Stage (Doxy/Okeh, 2016) – live rec. 1979–2012

With Dr. Lonnie Smith

- Too Damn Hot (Palmetto, 2004)
- Jungle Soul (Palmetto, 2006)
- Rise Up! (Palmetto, 2008)
- The Art of Organizing (Criss Cross Jazz, 2009)

With Grant Stewart

- More Urban Tones (Criss Cross Jazz, 1996)
- Shadow of Your Smile (Birds, 2007)
- Around the Corner (Sharp Nine, 2010)

With Sam Yahel

- Searchin (Naxos, 1997) – rec. 1996
- Trio (Criss Cross Jazz, 1999) – rec. 1997
- In the Blink of an Eye (Naxos, 1999)

With others

- Harry Allen, Christmas in Swingtime (BMG, 2001)
- Ehud Asherie, Organic (Posi-Tone, 2010)
- Teodross Avery, My Generation (Impulse!, 1996)
- Pat Bianchi, In the Moment (Savant, 2018)
- Bob Belden, When Doves Cry (Metro Blue, 1994)
- Bubba Brooks, Smooth Sailing (TCB, 1997)
- LaVerne Butler, Day Dreamin (Chesky, 1994)
- Igor Butman, Sheherazade's Tales (Butman Music, 2011)
- Ron Carter, In Memory of Jim (Somethin' Else, 2014)
- Bill Charlap, I'm Old Fashioned (Venus, 2010)
- George Coleman, A Master Speaks (Smoke Sessions, 2016)
- Trudy Desmond, Make Me Rainbows (Koch, 1995)
- Klaus Doldinger, Back in New York Blind Date (WEA, 1999)
- Renee Fleming, Christmas in New York (Decca, 2014)
- Fleurine, Fire (Coast to Coast, 2002)
- Ken Fowser, Resolution (WJ3, 2023)
- Caesar Frazier, Tenacity / As We Speak (Track Merchant, 2022)
- Jon Gordon, The Things We Need (Double-Time, 1999)
- Wycliffe Gordon, Dig This! (Criss Cross Jazz, 2002)
- Bill Heid, Wylie Avenue (Doodlin', 2009)
- Ian Hendrickson-Smith, Still Smokin (Sharp Nine, 2004)
- Bobby Hutcherson, Somewhere in the Night (Kind of Blue, 2012)
- Etta Jones, Sings Lady Day (HighNote, 2001)
- Geoffrey Keezer, Other Spheres (DIW, 1993)
- Nancy Kelly, B That Way (BlueBay, 2014)
- Lee Konitz, Parallels (Chesky, 2001)
- Doug Lawrence, High Heel Sneakers (Fable/Lightyear 1998)
- Brian Lynch, At the Main Event (Criss Cross Jazz, 1993)
- Harold Mabern, Afro Blue (Smoke Sessions, 2015)
- Kevin Mahogany, Kevin Mahogany (Warner Bros., 1996)
- Jane Monheit, The Lovers, The Dreamers and Me (Concord 2008)
- Ben Paterson, For Once in My Life (Origin, 2015)
- Nicholas Payton, Dear Louis (Verve, 2001)
- Jorge Rossy, Stay There (Pirouet, 2016)
- Jim Rotondi, New Vistas (Criss Cross Jazz, 2004)
- Mike Rud, Salome's Dance: The Mike Rud Trio Invites Peter Bernstein (Bent River, 2020)
- Anton Schwartz, Radiant Blue (Anton Jazz, 2006)
- Seatbelts, Cowboy Bebop: Vitaminless (Victor, 1998)
- Janis Siegel, Friday Night Special (Telarc, 2003)
- Gary Smulyan, Mike LeDonne, Kenny Washington, Smul's Paradise (Capri, 2012)
- Walt Weiskopf, A World Away (Criss Cross Jazz, 1995)
- Paula West, Come What May (Hi Horse, 2001)
