= Peck Morrison =

American jazz musician

John A. "Peck" Morrison (September 11, 1919 – February 25, 1988) was an American jazz bassist.

Morrison was classically trained, and was competent on trumpet and percussion in addition to bass. He played in military bands in Italy during World War II and moved to New York City after the war to play professionally. He played with Lucky Thompson in the early 1950s, and then recorded with Horace Silver, Gigi Gryce, and Art Farmer. He played with Gerry Mulligan in tours of Europe. He was a noted accompanist and sideman, playing with Carmen McRae, Tiny Bradshaw, King Pleasure, Zoot Sims, Eddie Jefferson, the J. J. Johnson/Kai Winding Quintet (1954), Duke Ellington (1955 and 1964), Lou Donaldson, Johnny Smith, Mal Waldron, Randy Weston, Babs Gonzales, the Newport Rebels (1960), Shirley Scott, Red Garland, Charles McPherson, and Sy Oliver and the Harlem Blues and Jazz Band (1986).

Morrison never recorded as a session leader.

== Discography ==
With Dave Bailey

- One Foot in the Gutter (Epic, 1960)
- Gettin' Into Somethin' (Epic, 1961)

With Betty Carter

- Out There (Peacock, 1958)

With Lou Donaldson

- Wailing With Lou (Blue Note, 1957)
- Swing and Soul (Blue Note, 1957)
- Blues Walk (Blue Note, 1958)
- Light-Foot (Blue Note, 1959)

With Duke Ellington

- All Star Road Band Volume 2 (Doctor Jazz, 1964 [1985])
- Ellington '66 (Reprise, 1966)

With Red Garland

- Soul Burnin' (Prestige, 1961)
- Rediscovered Masters (Prestige, 1961)
- The Quota (MPS, 1971 [1973])

With Willis Jackson

- Really Groovin' (Prestige, 1961)
- In My Solitude (Moodsville, 1961)

With Etta Jones

- Love Shout (Prestige, 1963)

With Joe Jones

- My Fire! (Prestige, 1969)

With Gildo Mahones

- I'm Shooting High (Prestige, 1963)

With Charles McPherson

- From This Moment On! (Prestige, 1968)

With Gerry Mulligan

- Presenting the Gerry Mulligan Sextet (EmArcy, 1955)

With Charlie Rouse

- Yeah! (Epic, 1961)

With Jazz Artists Guild with Max Roach, Eric Dolphy, and others

- Newport Rebels (Candid, 1961)

With Shirley Scott

- Workin' (Prestige, 1961)
- Stompin' (Prestige, 1961)

With Randy Weston

- Piano á la Mode (Jubilee, 1957)
- Destry Rides Again (United Artists, 1959)
- Highlife (Colpix, 1963)
