= Live in Bologna =

Live in Bologna may refer to:

- Live in Bologna (Cecil Taylor album)
- Live in Bologna (Lou Donaldson album)
