= The Best Things in Life Are Free =

The Best Things in Life are Free may refer to:

- The Best Things in Life Are Free (Ray Henderson song), a 1927 pop music standard
- The Best Things in Life Are Free (Luther Vandross and Janet Jackson song), a 1992 song
- The 1956 film The Best Things in Life Are Free (film)
