= Buddy Lucas (musician) =

American jazz musician

Alonza Westbrook "Buddy" Lucas (August 16, 1914 – March 18, 1983) was an American jazz saxophonist and bandleader, who is possibly more famous for his session work on harmonica.

As a bandleader, he led bands such as Buddy Lucas & His Band of Tomorrow, the Gone All Stars, and Buddy Lucas & His Shouters, and he also went under the stage name of "Big" Buddy Lucas.

As a session musician, he recorded with Horace Silver, Bernard "Pretty" Purdie, Titus Turner, The Rascals, Yusef Lateef, and Aretha Franklin, amongst others. He also played sax on Dion and the Belmonts (and Dion's later solo recordings) on Laurie Records.

He was born in Rockville, Alabama, and died in Stamford, Connecticut, aged 68.

== Discography ==
As leader/co-leader

- 1952: "Hustlin' Family Blues"/"I'll Never Smile Again" – Buddy Lucas and His Band of Tomorrow
- 1952: "Drive Daddy Drive" – Little Sylvia Sings with Buddy Lucas and His Band of Tomorrow
- 1954: "A Million Tears" – Little Sylvia Sings with Buddy Lucas Orchestra
- 1956: "Blueberry Hill"
- 1957: "Bo-Lee"/"Star Dust"
- 1957: "Hound Dog"/"When My Dreamboat Comes Home" – Buddy Lucas with Jimmy Carrol & Orchestra
- 1957: "Searchin'" Buddy Lucas
- 1967: Honkin' Sax

As sideman

- 1956: Fever - Little Willie John
- 1960: Wish Upon A Star (album) - Dion and the Belmonts
- 1963: Hobo Flats – Jimmy Smith
- 1963: Tread Ye Lightly – Clark Terry and Bob Brookmeyer
- 1964: Unforgettable: A Tribute to Dinah Washington – Aretha Franklin
- 1966: Hoochie Coochie Man – Jimmy Smith
- 1967: Nina Simone Sings the Blues – Nina Simone
- 1967: Singing the Blues – Joe Turner
- 1967: Soul Drums – Bernard Purdie
- 1967: More Than a New Discovery – Laura Nyro
- 1967: Groove Merchant – Jerome Richardson
- 1967: Cherry Red – Eddie "Cleanhead" Vinson
- 1968: New Grass – Albert Ayler
- 1968: Once Upon a Dream – The Rascals
- 1968: The Blue Yusef Lateef – Yusef Lateef
- 1971: Quiet Fire – Roberta Flack
- 1971: Afrique – Count Basie
- 1972: The Prophet – Johnny Hammond
- 1973: Sassy Soul Strut – Lou Donaldson
- 1974: Sweet Lou – Lou Donaldson
- 1974: Potpourri – The Thad Jones/Mel Lewis Orchestra
- 1975: Midnight Lightning – Jimi Hendrix (posthumous)
- 1976: A Street Called Straight – Roy Buchanan
- 2005: The Soul of Nina Simone – Nina Simone (recorded 1963–1987)
