= Rediscovered Masters =

Compilation album by Red Garland
- Released: 1977
- Recorded: June 27, 1958 (#1–7); Van Gelder Studio, Hackensack; August 12, 1959 (#8–11); March 16, 1961 (#12–14); Van Gelder Studio, Englewood Cliffs, New Jersey
- Genre: Jazz
- Length: 101:48
- Label: Prestige; P 24078
- Producer: Bob Weinstock (#1–11); Esmond Edwards (#12–14)

Professional ratings
Review scores
Source	Rating
The Penguin Guide to Jazz Recordings	Vol. 1 (CD)
The Penguin Guide to Jazz Recordings	Vol. 2 (CD)

Rediscovered Masters is a 1977 double LP by jazz pianist Red Garland releasing previously unissued recordings from sessions held between 1958 and 1961, which was issued by the Prestige label. It was later reissued on two CDs featuring one bonus track. 2 more tracks with the Richard Williams Oliver Nelson quintet can be found on the Soul Burnin' album

== Track listing ==
1. "Lover" - 5:14
2. "Five O'Clock Whistle" - 5:13
3. "Blues in Mambo" - 7:24
4. "A Ticket, a Tasket" - 7:07
5. "Estrellita" - 6:58
6. "It Might As Well Be Spring" - 8:41
7. "East of the Sun" - 9:14
8. "Blues in the Closet" - 5:37
9. "Blue Velvet" - 5:50
10. "Mr. Wonderful" - 9:55
11. "Satin Doll" - 9:48 Bonus track on CD reissue
12. "Skinny's Blues" - 8:09
13. "Soft Winds" - 6:14
14. "Avalon" - 6:24

== Personnel ==
Tracks 1–7

- Red Garland - piano
- Paul Chambers - bass
- Art Taylor - drums
- Ray Barretto - congas

Tracks 8–11

- Red Garland - piano
- Doug Watkins - double bass
- Specs Wright - drums

Tracks 12–14

- Red Garland - piano
- Oliver Nelson - tenor sax, alto sax
- Richard Williams - trumpet
- Peck Morrison - double bass
- Charlie Persip - drums
