= Wilbur Bascomb =

- Born: Wilbur D. Bascomb Jr. Washington Heights, Manhattan, New York, U.S.
- Genres: Jazz funk, soul jazz, blues, crossover
- Occupations: Musician, songwriter
- Instrument: Bass guitar
- Years active: 1970s–present

Wilbur D. Bascomb Jr. is an American bass guitarist. He is the son of jazz trumpeter Wilbur "Dud" Bascomb, who played with Erskine Hawkins and Duke Ellington.

== Career ==
In the 1970s, Bascomb worked with James Brown (1974), then recorded on the album Wired (1976) by Jeff Beck. During the next year, he released the solo album Wilbur Bascomb and Future Dreams. He has worked with Frank Owens, Galt MacDermot, Roy Ayers, George Benson, Hank Crawford, Bo Diddley, B.B. King, Bernard Purdie, Mick Taylor, and Players Association.

== Discography ==
=== As leader ===
- 1977 Wilbur Bascomb and Future Dreams

=== As sideman ===
With George Benson

- 1975 Good King Bad (CTI)

With Rusty Bryant

- 1973 For the Good Times
- 1974 Until It's Time for You to Go (Prestige)

With Hank Crawford

- 1983 Indigo Blue
- 1984 Down on the Deuce
- 1985 Roadhouse Symphony
- 1986 Mr. Chips
- Night Beat (Milestone, 1989)
- Groove Master (Milestone, 1990)
- 1993 South Central
- After Dark (Milestone, 1998)

With Joey DeFrancesco

- Where Were You? (Columbia, 1990)

With Bo Diddley

- Big Bad Bo (Chess, 1974)

With Lou Donaldson

- 1973 Sassy Soul Strut
- 1974 Sweet Lou

With Bunky Green

- Transformations (Vanguard, 1977)

With Rupert Holmes

- 1974 Widescreen
- 1978 Pursuit of Happiness

With Etta Jones

- 1989 Sugar (Muse)
- 1990 Christmas with Etta Jones (Muse)

With Galt MacDermot

- 1998 El Nino
- 2000 Spotted Owl
- 2003 Up from the Basement

With Jimmy McGriff

- McGriff Avenue (Milestone, 2002)

With Blue Mitchell

- Many Shades of Blue (Mainstream, 1974)

With Idris Muhammad

- 1976 House of the Rising Sun
- 1977 Turn This Mutha Out
- 1979 Fox Huntin'

With David "Fathead" Newman

- Keep the Dream Alive (Prestige, 1978)
- Scratch My Back (Prestige, 1979)

With Frank Owens

- Brown'n Serve (1973)

With Houston Person

- Suspicions (Muse, 1980)
- Heavy Juice (Muse, 1982)
- Always on My Mind (Muse, 1985)
- Christmas with Houston Person & Etta Jones (1997)

With Bernard Purdie

- 2001 King of the Beat
- 2003 Lialeh

With Big Mama Thornton

- 1975 Sassy Mama!
- 1978 Mama's Pride

With Reuben Wilson

- Got To Get Your Own (1975)
- Movin' On (Savant, 2006)

With others

- 1972 The Essence of Mystery, Alphonse Mouzon
- 1972 Dig This, Bobbi Humphrey
- 1973 Donato Deodato, Joao Donato
- 1973 From the Depths of My Soul, Marlena Shaw
- 1973 Lean on Him, Buddy Terry (Mainstream)
- 1974 Experience and Judgment, Andy Bey
- 1974 Change Up the Groove, Roy Ayers
- 1974 The Fourth Dimension, Jack McDuff
- 1974 Keepin' up with the Joneses, The Joneses
- 1974 Reality, James Brown
- 1975 Chuck Berry, Chuck Berry
- 1975 Got to Get Your Own, Reuben Wilson
- 1975 Michael Bolotin, Michael Bolton
- 1976 Transformations, Bunky Green
- 1976 Tymes Up, The Tymes
- 1976 Wired, Jeff Beck
- 1977 Cinnamon Flower, Charlie Rouse
- 1977 Herbie Mann and Fire Island, Herbie Mann
- 1977 Lady Put the Light Out, Frankie Valli
- 1977 Portfolio, Grace Jones
- 1977 You've Come a Long Way, Baby, Esther Phillips
- 1977 The Mysterious Flying Orchestra, The Mysterious Flying Orchestra
- 1978 Born to Dance, Players Association
- 1978 How Do You Take Your Love, Major Harris
- 1979 Hair: Original Soundtrack Recording
- 1979 Midnight Rendezvous, Tasha Thomas
- 1981 The Right Track, Wilson Pickett
- 1981 There Must Be a Better World Somewhere, B.B. King
- 1984 Live at Carnegie Hall & Montreaux, Switzerland, Teresa Brewer
- 1986 Midnight Lady Called the Blues, Jimmy Witherspoon
- 1988 Today's Love Songs Tomorrow's Blues, Arthur Prysock
- 1989 Hot Tat, Richard Holmes
- 1990 Where Were You?, Joey DeFrancesco
- 1992 Crazy for You, John Hicks
- 1992 I'll Take Care of You, Cissy Houston, Chuck Jackson
- 1992 I'm Ready, Lucky Peterson
- 1996 Blue Guru, Jon Tiven
- 1998 Blue Breakbeats, Bobbi Humphrey
- 1999 As Phat as It Gets, Leslie West
