= A Different Scene =

Studio album by Lou Donaldson
- Released: 1976
- Recorded: April 1976
- Genre: Jazz
- Label: Cotillion
- Producer: John Brantley & Rick Willard

Lou Donaldson chronology
Sweet Lou (1974)	A Different Scene (1976)	Color as a Way of Life (1976)

Professional ratings
Review scores
Source	Rating
Allmusic	link

A Different Scene is an album by jazz saxophonist Lou Donaldson, his first recorded for the Cotillion label, featuring Donaldson with a big band arranged by Mike Goldberg and Ricky West.

The album was awarded 2 out of 5 stars in an Allmusic review.

== Track listing ==
No.	Title	Writer(s)	Length
1.	"You Are My Sunshine"	Jimmie Davis, Charles Mitchell	5:24
2.	"Lovin' You"	Minnie Riperton, Richard Rudolph	3:46
3.	"High Wire"	Burton, Mercey	3:51
4.	"Night and Day"	Cole Porter	5:28
5.	"Temptation"	Nacio Herb Brown, Arthur Freed	5:18
6.	"Here's Lovin' at You"	Baxter	4:30
7.	"For the Love of You"	Ronald Isley, Marvin Isley, O'Kelly Isley, Chris Jasper	3:25
8.	"Keep Your Woman"	Baxter	4:11

Recorded at Groove Sound Studios, NYC, April 1976

== Personnel ==
- Lou Donaldson – alto saxophone
- Mike Goldberg – cornet, trumpet, piano, arranger, conductor
- Ricky West – electric piano, clavinet, mellotron, arranger, conductor
- Larry Etkin – trumpet
- John Kelly – trombone
- Robert Corley – tenor saxophone
- Joe Ferguson – tenor saxophone, flute
- A.C. Drummer Jr. – rhythm guitar
- Jacob Hunter – electric bass
- Walter "Jojo" Garth – drums
- Tony Baxter – lead vocals
- Audrinne Ferguson, Cissy Houston, Eddie Jones, Eunice Peterson, Kenny Seymour, Rennelle Stafford – backing vocals
- Unidentified string section
