= Sweet Lou (album) =

Studio album by Lou Donaldson
- Released: 1974
- Recorded: March 14, 19 & 21, 1974
- Studio: Generation Sound, New York City
- Genre: Jazz
- Label: Blue Note
- Producer: Horace Ott & George Butler

Lou Donaldson chronology
Sassy Soul Strut (1973)	Sweet Lou (1974)	A Different Scene (1976)

Professional ratings
Review scores
Source	Rating
Allmusic	2.5/5 stars

Sweet Lou is an album by jazz saxophonist Lou Donaldson, his final recorded for the Blue Note label, featuring Donaldson with a big band arranged and conducted by Horace Ott.

The album was awarded 3 stars in an Allmusic review by Eugene Chadbourne who stated "the passing of time has been in some ways been kind to these efforts, blurring the original impression given of careers headed downhill. Donaldson's tone on alto saxophone, regardless of setting, sounds like Charlie Parker after he has spent the night stuffed into one of those jars of pickled eggs on the menu in particularly hardcore bars".

== Track listing ==
All compositions by Lou Donaldson except as indicated

1. "You're Welcome, Stop On By" (Bobby Womack) – 3:55
2. "Lost Love" – 5:49
3. "Hip Trip" (Horace Ott) – 6:28
4. "If You Can't Handle It, Give It To Me" (Horace Ott) – 3:53
5. "Love Eyes" (Horace Ott) – 3:55
6. "Peepin'" (Lonnie Smith) – 6:14
7. "Herman's Mambo" (Herman Foster) – 4:36

- Recorded at Generation Sound Studios, NYC on March 14 (tracks 3–5), March 19 (tracks 2, 6 & 7) and March 21 (track 1), 1974.

== Personnel ==
- Lou Donaldson – varitone alto saxophone
- Ernie Royal, Joe Shepley, Danny Moore – trumpet
- Garnett Brown – trombone
- Seldon Powell, Arthur Clarke – tenor saxophone, flute
- Buddy Lucas – harmonica
- Horace Ott – keyboards, synthesizer, arranger, conductor
- Paul Griffin – clavinet
- Hugh McCracken, David Spinozza, Cornell Dupree – electric guitar
- Wilbur Bascomb – electric bass
- Bernard Purdie, Jimmy Young – drums
- Unknown – percussion
- Barbara Massey, Hilda Harris, Eileen Gilbert, Carl Williams Jr., William Sample, Bill Davis, Eric Figueroa – vocals
