= Relaxing at Sea: Live on the QE2 =

Live album by Lou Donaldson
- Released: November 2000
- Recorded: November 5, 6, 8 & 10, 1999
- Venue: Queen Elizabeth 2
- Genre: Jazz
- Length: 79:56
- Label: Chiaroscuro
- Producer: SOS Productions in conjunction with HOSS

Lou Donaldson chronology
Sentimental Journey (1995)	Relaxing at Sea: Live on the QE2 (2000)

Professional ratings
Review scores
Source	Rating
Allmusic	4/5 stars
The Penguin Guide to Jazz Recordings	3/4 stars

Relaxing at Sea: Live on the QE2 is a live album by jazz saxophonist Lou Donaldson recorded on the Queen Elizabeth 2 ocean liner and released on the Chiaroscuro label featuring Donaldson with Lonnie Smith, Randy Johnston, and Danny Burger with Nicholas Payton added on trumpet on two tracks.

The album was awarded 4 stars in an Allmusic review by Alex Henderson who states "Donaldson continued to command a loyal following when he entered his 70s; the improviser had just turned 73 when Relaxing at Sea was recorded... it was obvious that he could still play the heck out of his alto... Although it falls short of essential, Relaxing at Sea Live on the QE2 is a solid, pleasing addition to Donaldson's huge catalog".

== Track listing ==
All compositions by Lou Donaldson except as indicated

1. "Harlem Nocturne" (Earle Hagen, Dick Rogers) – 7:57
2. "Marmaduke" (Charlie Parker) – 8:07
3. "Whiskey Drinkin' Woman" – 12:34
4. "Midnight Creeper" – 6:27
5. "Fast and Freaky" – 5:26
6. "It Was a Dream" (Big Bill Broonzy) – 7:03
7. "Confirmation" (Parker) – 8:02
8. "Now's the Time" (Parker) – 10:32
9. "I Can't Get Started" (Vernon Duke, Ira Gershwin) – 7:32
10. "Lou's New York Theme Song" – 0:34
11. Jazzspeak – 5:38

- Recorded aboard the QE2 on November 5, 6, 8 & 10, 1999.

== Personnel ==
- Lou Donaldson – alto saxophone, vocals
- Nicholas Payton – trumpet (tracks 8 & 9)
- Lonnie Smith – organ
- Randy Johnston – guitar
- Danny Burger – drums
