= Avalon (Al Jolson song) =

1920 popular song written by Al Jolson, Buddy DeSylva and Vincent Rose

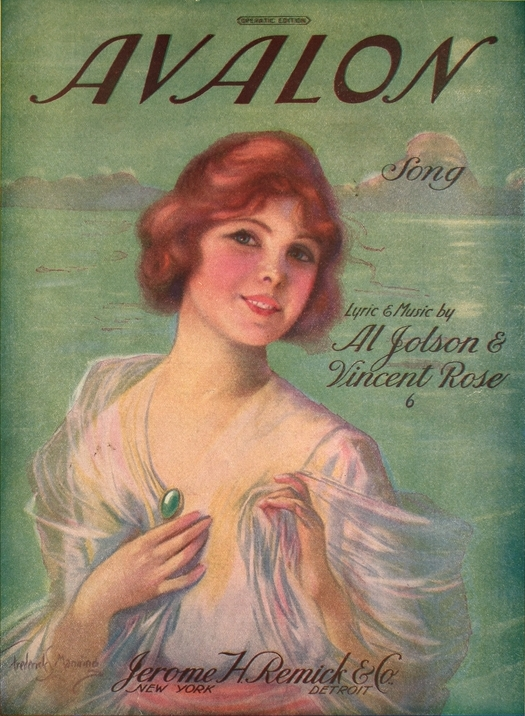
- Early sheet music cover

Song by Al Jolson
- Written: 1920
- Published: September 4, 1920 by Jerome H. Remick & Co., New York
- Genre: Jazz
- Songwriters: Al Jolson, Buddy DeSylva, Vincent Rose

Al Jolson's 1920 recording of "Avalon".

"Avalon" is a 1920 popular song written by Al Jolson, Buddy DeSylva and Vincent Rose referencing Avalon, California. It was introduced by Jolson and interpolated in the musicals Sinbad and Bombo. Jolson's recording rose to number two on the charts in 1921. The song was possibly written by Rose, but Jolson's popularity as a performer allowed him to claim composer co-credit. Originally, only Rose and Jolson were credited, and DeSylva's name was added later.

A popular jazz standard, the song has been recorded by many artists, including Cab Calloway (1934), Coleman Hawkins (1935) and Eddie Durham (1936). The Benny Goodman Quartet played the song in their famous 1938 Carnegie Hall concert. The tune remains popular in the gypsy jazz repertoire, having been performed by Wawau Adler and others.

The tune's opening melody resembles a part of Giacomo Puccini's aria E lucevan le stelle, from the opera Tosca, but in the major key. Puccini's publishers sued the song's composers in 1921 for use of the melody, and were awarded $25,000 and all subsequent royalties of the song by the court.

== Film appearances ==
The song was included in the biographical films The Jolson Story (1946) and The Benny Goodman Story (1956). The song was played in the background in the 1932 film You Said a Mouthful which starred Joe E. Brown. It also appears in the 1944 film adaptation of Janie.

Al Jolson recorded it for Rose of Washington Square (1939); although it was cut from the finished film, the audio recording survives.

It can also be heard in The Helen Morgan Story (1957) where it is performed by Ann Blyth (dubbed by Gogi Grant) with chorus girls.

It appears in It's a Wonderful Life (1946). It is playing in the background in a party scene about 35 minutes into the film, where George Bailey's mother urges George to pay a visit to Mary Hatch.

The song is played during the opening credits of Peter Bogdanovich's The Cat's Meow (2001), a film about an ill-fated 1924 voyage along the California coast aboard a yacht belonging to William Randolph Hearst.

== Renditions ==
- Paul Whiteman and His Ambassador Orchestra (23 August 1920)
- Charles W. Harrison (1920)
- Art Hickman's Orchestra (1921)
- Harry Raderman's Jazz Orchestra (1921)
- Red Nichols and His Five Pennies (25 February 1928 [or 27 February 1928, according to some sources])
- George Monkhouse and his Cambridge University Quinquaginta Ramblers (12 March 1930)
- Spike Hughes and his Dance Orchestra (23 May 1930)
- Joel Shaw and his Orchestra (August 1932)
- Billy Cotton and his Band (21 July 1933)
- Casa Loma Orchestra (16 August 1934)
- Cab Calloway and his Orchestra (4 September 1934)
- Scott Wood and his Six Swingers (18 December 1934; 1 September 1936)
- Joe Venuti and his Orchestra (26 December 1934)
- KXYZ Novelty Band (29 January 1935)
- Coleman Hawkins (2 March 1935)
- Quintette of the Hot Club of France (July 1935)
- Jimmie Lunceford and his Orchestra (30 September 1935)
- Harry Roy and his Orchestra (8 November 1935)
- Val Rosing and his Swing Stars (18 November 1935)
- Ballyhooligans (7 July 1936)
- Benny Goodman Quartet (29 June 1937; 28 September 1937; 16 January 1938)
- Joe Daniels and his Hotshots (28 September 1937)
- Alix Combelle et son Orchestre (4 October 1937)
- Harry James and his Orchestra (13 July 1939; 8 November 1939)
- Chet Atkins and Les Paul on the album Chester and Lester, 1976
- Willie Lewis and his Negro Band (27 June 1941)
- Bing Crosby - included in his album New Tricks (1957)
- Nat King Cole Welcome to the Club (1959)
- Anita O’Day Incomparable (16 August 1960)
- Lou Donaldson and guest musicians on the album Gravy Train (1961)
- Harry Connick, Jr. on the album 20 (1988)
- Natalie Cole on the album Unforgettable... with Love (1991)
- Jacob Fischer on the album Jacob Fischer...In New York City (2015)
- Max Raabe on the album MTV Unplugged (2019)

== See also ==
- List of 1920s jazz standards
