= Sophisticated Lou =

Studio album by Lou Donaldson
- Released: 1973
- Recorded: December 8, 11 & 18, 1972
- Genre: Jazz
- Label: Blue Note
- Producer: George Butler

Lou Donaldson chronology
Cosmos (1971)	Sophisticated Lou (1973)	Sassy Soul Strut (1973)

Professional ratings
Review scores
Source	Rating
Allmusic	2/5 stars

Sophisticated Lou is an album by jazz saxophonist Lou Donaldson recorded for the Blue Note label featuring Donaldson with Joe Farrell, Paul Winter, Joe Venuto, Derek Smith, Jay Berliner, Richard Davis, Ron Carter, Grady Tate, and Omar Clay with a string section arranged by Wade Marcus.

The album was awarded 2 stars in an Allmusic review by Stephen Thomas Erlewine who stated "Sophisticated Lou pales when compared to the great Lush Life, but it remains a fairly successful effort, and it's a nice change of pace after several albums of funky soul-jazz".

== Track listing ==
All compositions by Lou Donaldson except as indicated

1. "You've Changed" (Bill Carey, Carl T. Fischer) - 4:55
2. "Stella by Starlight" (Ned Washington, Victor Young) - 4:45
3. "What Are You Doing the Rest of Your Life?" (Alan Bergman, Marilyn Bergman, Michel Legrand) - 4:32
4. "Long Goodbye" (Johnny Mercer, John Williams) - 3:32
5. "You Are the Sunshine of My Life" (Stevie Wonder) - 3:46
6. "Autumn in New York" (Vernon Duke) - 4:31
7. "Blues Walk" - 5:07
8. "Time After Time" (Sammy Cahn, Jule Styne) - 6:45

- Recorded at A&R Studios, NYC on December 8 (tracks 1, 3, 6 & 8), December 11 (tracks 2, 4, 5 & 7), & December 18 (string overdubs), 1972.

== Personnel ==
- Lou Donaldson - alto saxophone
- Joe Farrell, Paul Winter - flute, alto flute
- Eugene Bianco - harp
- Joe Venuto - vibes
- Derek Smith - piano, electric piano
- Jay Berliner - guitar, 12 string guitar
- Richard Davis (tracks 1, 3, 6 & 8), Ron Carter (tracks 2, 4, 5 & 7) - bass
- Grady Tate - drums
- Omar Clay - percussion
- Harry Lookofsky, Aaron Rosand, Irving Spice - violin
- Harry Zaratzian, Seymour Berman - viola
- Seymour Barab - cello
- Wade Marcus - arranger
