= Fried Buzzard =

Live album by Lou Donaldson
- Released: 1970
- Recorded: August 6–7, 1965
- Venue: Bon Ton Club, Buffalo, New York
- Genre: Jazz
- Length: 37:22
- Label: Cadet; LPS-842

Lou Donaldson chronology
Musty Rusty (1965)	Fried Buzzard (1970)	Blowing in the Wind (1966)

Professional ratings
Review scores
Source	Rating
Allmusic	3/5 stars
The Penguin Guide to Jazz Recordings	3/4 stars

Fried Buzzard is a live album by jazz saxophonist Lou Donaldson recorded at the Bon Ton Club in Buffalo, NY for the Cadet label in 1965 but not released until 1970.

== Reception ==
The album was awarded 3 stars in an Allmusic review.

== Track listing ==
All compositions by Lou Donaldson except as indicated

1. "Fried Buzzard" - 11:18
2. "Summertime" (George Gershwin, Ira Gershwin, DuBose Heyward) - 5:38
3. "Peck Time" - 3:10
4. "The Thang" - 8:11
5. "The Best Things in Life Are Free" (Lew Brown, Buddy DeSylva, Ray Henderson) - 6:02
6. "Wee" (Denzil Best) - 3:03
- Recorded at the Bon Ton Club in Buffalo, New York on August 6 & 7, 1965.

== Personnel ==
- Lou Donaldson - alto saxophone
- Bill Hardman - trumpet
- Billy Gardner - organ
- Warren Stephens - guitar
- Leo Morris - drums
