= Midnight Creeper =

Studio album by Lou Donaldson
- Released: Late September/early October 1968
- Recorded: March 15, 1968
- Studios: Van Gelder Studio, Englewood Cliffs, New Jersey
- Genre: Jazz
- Length: 36:09
- Labels: Blue Note; BST 84280
- Producer: Francis Wolff

Lou Donaldson chronology
Mr. Shing-A-Ling (1967)	Midnight Creeper (1968)	Say It Loud! (1968)

Alternative cover
- LP full gatefold artwork

Professional ratings
Review scores
Source	Rating
Allmusic	4/5 stars
The Penguin Guide to Jazz Recordings	3/4 stars

Midnight Creeper is an album by jazz saxophonist Lou Donaldson recorded for the Blue Note label in 1968 and featuring Donaldson with Blue Mitchell, Lonnie Smith, George Benson, and Leo Morris.

== Chart performance ==
The album debuted on Billboard magazine's Top LP's chart in the issue dated October 26, 1968, peaking at No. 182 during a six-week run on the chart.

== Reception ==
The album was awarded 4 stars in an Allmusic review by Stephen Thomas Erlewine who states "As he delved deeper into commercial soul-jazz and jazz-funk, Lou Donaldson became better at it. While lacking the bite of his hard bop improvisations or the hard-swinging funk of Alligator Bogaloo, Midnight Creeper succeeds where its predecessor, Mr. Shing-A-Ling failed: it offers a thoroughly enjoyable set of grooving, funky soul-jazz... Donaldson could frequently sound stilted on his commercial soul-jazz dates, but that's not the case with Midnight Creeper. He rarely was quite as loose on his late-'60s/early-'70s records as he is here, and that's what makes Midnight Creeper a keeper".

== Track listing ==
1. "Midnight Creeper" (Donaldson) - 6:32
2. "Love Power" (Teddy Vann) - 7:46
3. "Elizabeth" (Donaldson) - 5:37
4. "Bag of Jewels" (Lonnie Smith) - 9:44
5. "Dapper Dan" (Harold Ousley) - 6:30

== Personnel ==
- Lou Donaldson - alto saxophone
- Blue Mitchell - cornet
- Lonnie Smith - organ
- George Benson - guitar
- Idris Muhammad - drums

== Charts ==
Chart (1968)	Peak position
US Billboard Top LPs	182
