= Herman Foster =

American bebop jazz pianist

- Born: April 26, 1928; Philadelphia, U.S.
- Died: April 3, 1999 (aged 70) New York City, New York
- Genres: Bebop, jazz
- Occupation: Musician
- Instrument: Piano

Herman Foster (April 26, 1928 – April 3, 1999) was an American bebop jazz pianist.

He was blinded during childbirth through the carelessness of a doctor. He began his musical career early playing the violin, clarinet, saxophone, and piano. He became a self-taught pianist. His family moved from Philadelphia to New York City in 1947 where he began to attend jam sessions and then played with Eric Dixon, Dick Carter and the big band of Herb Jones. Then he met Lou Donaldson and they played together from 1953 to 1966. He also worked with King Curtis, Bill English, and Seldon Powell in the 1950s, and with Al Casey and Gloria Lynne in the 1960s, in addition to playing with his own trio. He returned to work in Donaldson's quartet in the 1980s. In 1996 he married Hisayo Tominaga, a jazz vocalist.

== Discography ==
=== As leader ===
Year recorded	Title	Label	Personnel
1960?	Have You Heard	Epic	Trio, with Earl May (bass), Frankie Dunlop (drums)
1961?	The Explosive Piano of Herman Foster	Epic	Trio, with Earl May (bass), Grassella Oliphant (drums)
1963	Ready and Willing	Argo	Trio, with Herman Wright (bass), Bruno Carr (drums)
1984?	The One and Only	Timeless	Trio, with Jeff Fuller (bass), Victor Jones (drums)

=== As sideman ===
- 1957: Lou Donaldson: Wailing with Lou (Blue Note)
- 1957: Lou Donaldson: Swing and Soul (Blue Note)
- 1958: Lou Donaldson: Blues Walk (Blue Note)
- 1958: Lou Donaldson: Light-Foot (Blue Note)
- 1959: King Curtis: Have Tenor Sax, Will Blow (Atco Records)
- 1960: Al Casey: Buck Jumpin' (Swingville)
- 1961: Lou Donaldson: Gravy Train (Blue Note)
- 1961: Gloria Lynne: I'm Glad There Is You (Everest LPBR 5126)
- 1962: Gloria Lynne: At The Las Vegas Thunderbird (Everest)
- 1964: Joan Shaw In Person (Sue)
- 1964: Lou Donaldson: Cole Slaw (Argo)
- 1964: Jean DuShon: Make Way for Jean DuShon (Argo)
- 1966: Lou Donaldson: Blowing in the Wind (Cadet)
- 1972: Johnny Hartman: Today (Perception)
- 1981: Lou Donaldson: Sweet Poppa Lou (Muse)
- 1981: Lou Donaldson: Forgotten Man (Timeless)
- 1982: Lou Donaldson: Back Street (Muse)
- 1984: Lou Donaldson: Live in Bologna (Timeless)
- 1995: Hisayo Tominaga: Blues Blue (Black Box)
- 2000: George V. Johnson Jr.: Next in Line ! (Your Majesty)
