= Lou Donaldson at His Best =

Studio album by Lou Donaldson
- Released: 1969
- Recorded: August 30, 1966
- Studio: RCA Studios, New York City
- Genre: Jazz
- Label: Cadet; LPS-815
- Producer: Esmond Edwards, Richard Evans

Lou Donaldson chronology
Blowing in the Wind (1966)	Lou Donaldson at His Best (1969)	Lush Life (1967)

Professional ratings
Review scores
Source	Rating
Allmusic	3/5 stars

Lou Donaldson at His Best is an album by jazz saxophonist Lou Donaldson recorded for the Cadet label in 1966 and performed by Donaldson with trumpeter Bill Hardman, organist Billy Gardner, guitarist Calvin Newborn and drummer Grady Tate. ”Day by Day” and “Be Anything (But Be Mine)” are rarely played standards.

== Reception ==
The album was awarded 3 stars in an Allmusic review by Jason Ankeny who states "The title At His Best portends some kind of career overview, but in fact it's an all new session heralding the end of Lou Donaldson's tenure with the Cadet label. Moreover, it comes nowhere close to capturing the saxophonist at his most potent, settling for a rigid, disappointingly straightforward soul-jazz approach with few sparks of energy".

== Track listing ==
All compositions by Lou Donaldson except as indicated

1. "Win, Lose or Draw"
2. "Tangerine" (Johnny Mercer, Victor Schertzinger)
3. "Blues No. 3"
4. "Wig Blues"
5. "Day by Day" (Sammy Cahn, Axel Stordahl, Paul Weston)
6. "Greasy Papa"
7. "Be Anything (but Be Mine)" (Irving Gordon)

- Recorded in RCA Studios, New York City on August 30, 1965.

== Personnel ==
- Lou Donaldson - alto saxophone
- Bill Hardman - trumpet
- Billy Gardner - Hammond B-3 organ
- Calvin Newborn - guitar
- Grady Tate - drums
