= Rough House Blues =

Studio album by Lou Donaldson
- Released: 1965
- Recorded: December 1964
- Genre: Jazz
- Label: Cadet
- Producer: Esmond Edwards

Lou Donaldson chronology
Cole Slaw (1964)	Rough House Blues (1965)	Musty Rusty (1965)

Professional ratings
Review scores
Source	Rating
Allmusic	3/5 stars

Rough House Blues is an album by jazz alto saxophonist Lou Donaldson recorded for the Cadet label in 1964 and performed by Donaldson with an octet conducted and arranged by Oliver Nelson.

The album was awarded 3 stars in an Allmusic review by Ron Wynn who calls it Donaldson's "Best and most ambitious of mid-60s Argo albums".

== Track listing ==
All compositions by Lou Donaldson except as indicated

1. "Tippin' In" (Bobby Smith, Marty Symes) - 4:50
2. "L.D. Blues" - 3:10
3. "Days of Wine and Roses" (Henry Mancini, Johnny Mercer) - 4:25
4. "Ignant Oil" - 4:50
5. "Rough House Blues" - 6:30
6. "Back Talk" - 4:01
7. "Huffin' 'N' Puffin'" - 5:30

- Recorded in NYC December, 1964.

== Personnel ==
- Lou Donaldson - alto saxophone
- Dave Burns, Ernie Royal - trumpet
- Phil Woods - alto saxophone
- Bob Ashton - tenor saxophone
- Danny Bank - baritone saxophone
- Lloyd Mayers Jr. - Hammond organ
- Richard Davis - bass
- Grady Tate - drums
- Oliver Nelson - conductor, arranger
