= Swing and Soul =

Studio album by the Lou Donaldson Quintet
- Released: 1957
- Recorded: June 9, 1957
- Studio: Van Gelder Studio; Hackensack, New Jersey
- Genre: Jazz
- Length: 37:52
- Label: Blue Note; BLP 1566
- Producer: Alfred Lion

Lou Donaldson chronology
Wailing with Lou (1957)	Swing and Soul (1957)	Jimmy Smith Trio + LD (1957)

Swing and Soul is an album by the Lou Donaldson Quintet, recorded on June 9, 1957 and released on Blue Note later that year. The quintet features rhythm section Herman Foster, Peck Morrison and Dave Bailey, with Ray Barretto on congas.

== Reception ==
Professional ratings
Review scores
Source	Rating
AllMusic	3/5 stars

AllMusic awarded the album 3 stars.

== Track listing ==
All compositions by Lou Donaldson, except as noted.

=== Side 1 ===
1. "Dorothy" (Rudy Nichols) – 5:25
2. "I Won't Cry Any More" (Al Frisch, Fritz Wise) – 4:23
3. "Herman's Mambo" (Herman Foster) – 4:56
4. "Peck Time" – 5:23

=== Side 2 ===
1. "There'll Never Be Another You" (Mack Gordon, Harry Warren) – 5:08
2. "Groove Junction" – 6:19
3. "Grits and Gravy" – 6:18

== Personnel ==
=== Lou Donaldson Quintet ===
- Lou Donaldson – alto saxophone
- Herman Foster – piano
- Peck Morrison – bass
- Dave Bailey – drums
- Ray Barretto – congas

=== Technical personnel ===
- Alfred Lion – producer
- Rudy Van Gelder – recording engineer
- Reid Miles – design
- Francis Wolff – photography
- Ira Gitler – liner notes
