= Back Street (album) =

Studio album by Lou Donaldson
- Released: 1981
- Recorded: July 2, 1981
- Genre: Jazz
- Label: Muse

Lou Donaldson chronology
Forgotten Man (1981)	Back Street (1981)	Live in Bologna (1982)

Professional ratings
Review scores
Source	Rating
Allmusic	3/5 stars

Back Street is an album by jazz saxophonist Lou Donaldson, his second recording for the Muse label, featuring Donaldson's quartet with Herman Foster, Jeff Fuller, and Victor Jones.

The album was awarded 3 stars in an Allmusic review.

== Track listing ==
All compositions by Lou Donaldson except as indicated

1. "Be My Love" (Sammy Cahn, Nicholas Brodszky)
2. "Cheer Cheer"
3. "Now's the Time" (Charlie Parker)
4. "Exactly Like You" (Dorothy Fields, Jimmy McHugh)
5. "Back Street"
6. "Confirmation" (Charlie Parker)
  - Recorded in Paris, France in 1982.

== Personnel ==
- Lou Donaldson – alto saxophone, vocals
- Herman Foster – piano
- Jeff Fuller – bass
- Victor Jones – drums
