= Signifyin' (album) =

Studio album by Lou Donaldson
- Released: 1963
- Recorded: July 17, 1963
- Studio: A & R Recording Studio, New York, NY
- Genre: Jazz
- Length: 31:37
- Label: Argo; LP-724
- Producer: Esmond Edwards

Lou Donaldson chronology
Good Gracious! (1963)	Signifyin' (1963)	Possum Head (1964)

Professional ratings
Review scores
Source	Rating
Allmusic	4.5/5 stars

Signifyin' is an album by jazz saxophonist Lou Donaldson recorded for the Argo label in 1963 and performed by Donaldson with Roy Montrell, Tommy Turrentine, Big John Patton, and Ben Dixon.

== Reception ==
The album was awarded 4½ stars in an Allmusic review by Thom Jurek who states "Donaldson has a band that can cook whatever meat he gives them... the band keeps the beats tight, full of deep backbeat funk and raw soul... No matter how you add it up, the only complaint about these six tracks that can justifiably be mustered is that there weren't more".

== Track listing ==
All compositions by Lou Donaldson except where noted

1. "Signifyin'" - 7:07
2. "Time After Time" (Sammy Cahn, Jule Styne) - 2:35
3. "Si Si Safronia" - 5:38
4. "Don't Get Around Much Anymore" (Duke Ellington, Bob Russell) - 3:53
5. "I Feel It in My Bones" - 8:15
6. "Coppin' a Plea" - 4:09

== Personnel ==
- Lou Donaldson - alto saxophone
- Tommy Turrentine - trumpet - except track 2
- Roy Montrell - guitar
- Big John Patton - organ
- Ben Dixon - drums
