= Soul Burnin' =

Studio album by The Red Garland Trio
- Released: Early May 1964
- Recorded: August 12, 1959 (#6); July 15, 1960 (#3–5); March 16, 1961 (#1–2)
- Studio: Van Gelder Studio, Englewood Cliffs, NJ
- Genre: Jazz
- Length: 39:29
- Label: Prestige; PRLP 7307
- Producer: Esmond Edwards

The Red Garland Trio chronology
Halleloo-Y'-All (1960)	Soul Burnin' (1964)	Bright and Breezy (1961)

Professional ratings
Review scores
Source	Rating
Allmusic	3/5 stars
The Penguin Guide to Jazz Recordings	3/4 stars

Soul Burnin' is an album by jazz pianist Red Garland, recorded in 1960 and 1961, but not released on Prestige Records until 1964. The CD reissue features a bonus track, recorded in 1959, which originally appeared on Garland's album Satin Doll, first released in 1971.

== Track listing ==
1. "On Green Dolphin Street" (Bronisław Kaper, Ned Washington) - 8:21
2. "If You Could See Me Now" (Tadd Dameron, Carl Sigman) - 8:54
3. "Rocks in My Bed" (Duke Ellington) - 6:29
4. "Soul Burnin'" (Garland) - 5:00
5. "Blues in the Night" (Harold Arlen, Johnny Mercer) - 5:08
6. "A Little Bit of Basie" (Garland) - 5:37 Bonus track on CD reissue

== Personnel ==
Tracks 1–2

- Red Garland - piano
- Oliver Nelson - tenor sax (track 1), alto sax (track 2)
- Richard Williams - trumpet
- Peck Morrison - double bass
- Charlie Persip - drums

Tracks 3–5

- Red Garland - piano
- Sam Jones - double bass
- Art Taylor - drums

Track 6

- Red Garland - piano
- Doug Watkins - double bass
- Specs Wright - drums
