= Lou Takes Off =

Studio album by Lou Donaldson
- Released: July 1958
- Recorded: December 15, 1957
- Studio: Van Gelder Studio; Hackensack, NJ
- Genre: Jazz
- Length: 38:17
- Label: Blue Note; BLP 1591
- Producer: Alfred Lion

Lou Donaldson chronology
Jimmy Smith Trio + LD (1957)	Lou Takes Off (1958)	Blues Walk (1958)

Lou Takes Off is an album by American jazz saxophonist Lou Donaldson recorded on December 15, 1957 and released on Blue Note the following year. The sextet features brass section Donald Byrd and Curtis Fuller and rhythm section Sonny Clark, Jamil Nasser and Art Taylor.

== Background ==
According to Donaldson, Blue Note initially didn't like any of the album, "the conga drums or the new musicians."

== Reception ==
Professional ratings
Review scores
Source	Rating
AllMusic	4.5/5 stars

The AllMusic review by Lee Bloom states, "This recording marks a period in his development prior to a stylistic shift away from bop and toward a stronger rhythm and blues emphasis... Overall, Lou Takes Off breaks no new musical ground, but it is a solid, swinging session of high-caliber playing.

== Track listing ==
All tracks are written by Lou Donaldson, except as noted.

Side 1
No.	Title	Writer(s)	Length
1.	"Sputnik"		10:05
2.	"Dewey Square"	Charlie Parker	7:16

Side 2
No.	Title	Writer(s)	Length
1.	"Strollin' In"		14:34
2.	"Groovin' High"	Dizzy Gillespie	6:22

== Personnel ==
=== Musicians ===
- Lou Donaldson – alto saxophone
- Donald Byrd – trumpet
- Curtis Fuller – trombone
- Sonny Clark – piano
- Jamil Nasser (born George Joyner) – bass
- Art Taylor – drums

=== Technical personnel ===
- Alfred Lion – producer
- Rudy Van Gelder – recording engineer
- Reid Miles – design
- Francis Wolff – photography
