= Say It Loud! =

Studio album by Lou Donaldson
- Released: 1969
- Recorded: November 6, 1968
- Studio: Van Gelder Studio, Englewood Cliffs
- Genre: Jazz
- Length: 36:31
- Label: Blue Note; BST 84299
- Producer: Francis Wolff

Lou Donaldson chronology
Midnight Creeper (1968)	Say It Loud! (1969)	Hot Dog (1969)

Professional ratings
Review scores
Source	Rating
Allmusic	1.5/5 stars
The Penguin Guide to Jazz Recordings	3/4 stars

Say It Loud! is an album by jazz saxophonist Lou Donaldson recorded for the Blue Note label in 1968 and featuring Donaldson with Blue Mitchell, Charles Earland, Jimmy Ponder, and Leo Morris.

== Chart performance ==
The album debuted on Billboard magazine's Top LP's chart in the issue dated April 5, 1969, peaking at No. 153 during a seven-week run on the chart.

== Reception ==
The album was awarded 1½ stars in an Allmusic review by Stephen Thomas Erlewine who states "his group sounds awkward and uneasy. There are a few good moments scattered throughout the album, particularly by Mitchell, but overall, Say It Loud! is one of the weakest records in Donaldson's catalog". The album featured Donaldson utilising the varitone amplification system for saxophone.

== Track listing ==
All compositions by Lou Donaldson except as indicated

1. "Say It Loud (I'm Black and I'm Proud)" (James Brown, Pee Wee Ellis) - 7:32
2. "Summertime" (George Gershwin, Ira Gershwin, DuBose Heyward) - 5:49
3. "Caravan" (Duke Ellington, Irving Mills, Juan Tizol) - 5:22
4. "Snake Bone" - 9:31
5. "Brother Soul" (Donaldson, Leon Spencer) - 8:17

== Personnel ==
- Lou Donaldson - varitone alto saxophone, vocals
- Blue Mitchell - trumpet
- Charles Earland - organ
- Jimmy Ponder - guitar
- Leo Morris - drums

== Charts ==
Chart (1969)	Peak position
US Billboard Top LPs	153
