= Jimmy Smith Trio + LD =

Studio album by Jimmy Smith Trio With Lou Donaldson
- Released: February 21, 1985
- Recorded: July 4, 1957
- Studios: Manhattan Towers, New York City
- Genre: Jazz
- Length: 45:26
- Labels: Blue Note; BNJ 61013
- Producer: Alfred Lion

Jimmy Smith chronology
Plays Pretty Just for You (1957)	Jimmy Smith Trio + LD (1985)	Groovin' at Small's Paradise (1957)

Lou Donaldson chronology
Swing and Soul (1957)	Jimmy Smith Trio + LD (1985)	Lou Takes Off (1957)

Jimmy Smith Trio + LD is an album by jazz organist Jimmy Smith and saxophonist Lou Donaldson, recorded for the Blue Note label in 1957 and released only in Japan.

== Reception ==
The album was awarded 2½ stars by Stephen Thomas Erlewine in an Allmusic review which stated:

"in general, the session is bland but pleasant offering nothing truly memorable".

Professional ratings
Review scores
Source	Rating
Allmusic	2.5/5 stars

== Track listing ==
1. "Soft Winds" (Benny Goodman) – 7:58
2. "Hollerin' and Screamin'" (Eddie Davis) – 6:59
3. "'Round Midnight" (Thelonious Monk) – 6:27
4. "Star Eyes" (Gene DePaul, Don Raye) – 4:59
5. "Darn That Dream" (Eddie DeLange, Jimmy Van Heusen) – 6:41
6. "Street of Dreams" (Sam M. Lewis, Victor Young) – 5:12
7. "Cha Cha J" (Jimmy Smith, Lou Donaldson) – 4:18

== Personnel ==
=== Musicians ===
- Jimmy Smith – organ
- Lou Donaldson – alto saxophone, (tracks 1–2, 4, 6)
- Eddie McFadden – guitar
- Donald Bailey – drums

=== Technical ===
- Alfred Lion – producer
- Rudy Van Gelder – engineer
- Bob Porter – liner notes
