= Everything I Play Is Funky =

Everything I Play is Funky

Studio album by Lou Donaldson
- Released: June 1970
- Recorded: August 22, 1969 & January 9, 1970
- Studio: Van Gelder Studio, Englewood Cliffs, NJ
- Genre: Jazz, funk
- Length: 38:51
- Label: Blue Note; BST 84337
- Producer: Francis Wolff

Lou Donaldson chronology
Hot Dog (1969)	Everything I Play is Funky (1970)	Pretty Things (1970)

Professional ratings
Review scores
Source	Rating
Allmusic	3/5 stars
The Penguin Guide to Jazz Recordings	3/4 stars

Everything I Play is Funky is an album by jazz saxophonist Lou Donaldson recorded for the Blue Note label featuring Donaldson with Blue Mitchell, Lonnie Smith, Melvin Sparks, Jimmy Lewis and Idris Muhammad and two tracks with Eddie Williams and Charles Earland replacing Mitchell and Smith.

== Chart performance ==
The album debuted on Billboard magazine's Top LP's chart in the issue dated July 11, 1970, peaking at No. 190 during a two-week run on the chart.

== Reception ==
The album was awarded 3 stars in an Allmusic review by Steve Huey who states "Everything I Play Is Funky is easily one of the best examples of Lou Donaldson's commercially accessible period of the late '60s and early '70s. Donaldson's forays into funk and R&B-driven soul-jazz could sometimes sound stiff, but the grooves here — which feature many of the same players — are consistently limber and unforced. And, typical of the style, the grooves (not adventurous improvisation) are what make the album tick... This is the sort of record that modern-day Donaldson disciples like the Sugarman Three cherish, and one of his few truly consistent efforts in this style. Recommended wholeheartedly to funk and rare-groove fans".

== Track listing ==
All compositions by Lou Donaldson except as noted

1. "Everything I Do Gonh Be Funky (From Now On)" (Allen Toussaint) - 5:31
2. "Hamp's Hump" (Paul Hampton) - 6:40
3. "Over the Rainbow" (Harold Arlen, E.Y. "Yip" Harburg) - 7:11
4. "Donkey Walk" - 6:44
5. "West Indian Daddy" - 6:30
6. "Minor Bash" - 6:15

Recorded on August 22, 1969 (4–5) and January 9, 1970 (1–3 & 6).

== Personnel ==
Musicians

- Lou Donaldson – varitone alto saxophone, voice
- Blue Mitchell (tracks 1–3 & 6), Eddie Williams (tracks 4 & 5) – trumpet
- Lonnie Smith (tracks 1–3 & 6), Charles Earland (tracks 4 & 5) – Hammond organ
- Melvin Sparks – guitar
- Jimmy Lewis – Fender bass (tracks 1–3 & 6)
- Idris Muhammad – drums

Production

- Francis Wolff – producer
- Rudy Van Gelder – recording
- Bob Venosa/ Havona – cover design
- Patrick Roques – cover design (reissue)
- Charles Keddie – photography

== Charts ==
Chart (1970)	Peak position
US Billboard Top LPs	190
