= Color as a Way of Life =

Studio album by Lou Donaldson
- Released: 1977
- Recorded: December 1976
- Genre: Jazz
- Length: 36:31
- Label: Cotillion
- Producer: John Brantley, Rick Willard

Lou Donaldson chronology
A Different Scene (1976)	Color as a Way of Life (1977)	Sweet Poppa Lou (1981)

Professional ratings
Review scores
Source	Rating
Allmusic	2/5 stars

Color as a Way of Life is an album by jazz saxophonist Lou Donaldson, his second recorded for the Cotillion label, featuring Donaldson with an orchestra arranged by Mike Goldberg and Dennis Williams.

The album was awarded 2 stars in an Allmusic review.

== Track listing ==
All compositions by Lou Donaldson except as indicated

1. "Too Much to Explain" (Al Broomfield) – 4:13
2. "Love for Sale" (Cole Porter) – 5:04
3. "Piece of Your World" (Broomfield) – 4:32
4. "Passion Fruit" (Donaldson, Johnny Brantley, Rick Willard) – 4:03
5. "Comin' Thru the Back Door" (Broomfield) – 3:42
6. "Ebb Tide" (Robert Maxwell, Carl Sigman) – 5:18
7. "Maker's Dream" – 4:53
8. "Walkin' Sally" – 4:46
  - Recorded at Groove Sound Studios, NYC, December, 1976.

== Personnel ==
- Lou Donaldson – alto saxophone
- Paul G. Bogosian, Ernie Royal – trumpet, flugelhorn
- John Drew Kelly – trombone, bass trombone
- Seldon Powell – flute, baritone saxophone
- Irving Spice – lead violin
- Louis Haber, Elliott Rosoff, David Sackson, Louis Stone – violin
- William Phipps – electric piano, clavinet
- A.C. Drummer Jr. – guitar
- Jacob Hunter – electric bass
- Jimmy Young – drums
- Jacqueline Copeland – vocals
- Mike Goldberg – arranger, conductor
- Dennis Williams – horn and string arranger
