= Light-Foot =

Studio album by Lou Donaldson
- Released: 1959
- Recorded: December 14, 1958
- Studio: Van Gelder Studio, Hackensack, NJ
- Genre: Jazz
- Label: Blue Note 4053
- Producer: Alfred Lion

Lou Donaldson chronology
Blues Walk (1958)	Light-Foot (1959)	LD + 3 (1959)

Light-Foot is an album by jazz saxophonist Lou Donaldson recorded for the Blue Note label and performed by Donaldson's Quintet with pianist Herman Foster, bassist Peck Morrison, drummer Jimmy Wormworth and congalero Ray Barretto.

== Reception ==
Professional ratings
Review scores
Source	Rating
AllMusic	3/5 stars
DownBeat	3.5/5 stars

The contemporaneous DownBeat reviewer, John S. Wilson, suggested that the material chosen for the album did not allow Donaldson's potential to be fully realized. The album was awarded 3 stars by Stephen Thomas Erlewine in an Allmusic review which stated "With Light Foot, Donaldson still was pretty firmly grounded in bop, but the tempos began to slow down, and his blues influence came to the forefront; furthermore, the bop tracks are hard bop, not straight bop, which tended to dominate his previous recordings. That diversity makes Light Foot an interesting listen, but the record suffers from slightly uneven material and performances."

== Track listing ==
All compositions by Lou Donaldson except as indicated

1. "Light-Foot" - 5:35
2. "Hog Maw" - 7:39
3. "Mary Ann" - 6:41
4. "Green Eyes" (Nilo Menendez, Adolfo Utrera) - 5:21
5. "Walking by the River" (Una Mae Carlisle, Robert Sour) - 5:39
6. "Day Dreams" (Herman Foster) - 5:00
7. "Stella by Starlight" (Ned Washington, Victor Young) - 5:50

- Recorded at Rudy Van Gelder Studio, Hackensack, NJ on December 14, 1958.

== Personnel ==
Musicians

- Lou Donaldson - alto saxophone
- Herman Foster - piano
- Peck Morrison - bass
- Jimmy Wormworth - drums
- Ray Barretto - congas

Production

- Alfred Lion - producer
- Reid Miles - design
- Rudy Van Gelder - engineer
- Francis Wolff - photography
