= Sweet Poppa Lou =

Studio album by Lou Donaldson
- Released: 1981
- Recorded: January 7, 1981
- Studio: Van Gelder Studio, Englewood Cliffs, NJ
- Genre: Jazz
- Label: Muse
- Producer: Joe Fields

Lou Donaldson chronology
Color as a Way of Life (1977)	Sweet Poppa Lou (1981)	Forgotten Man (1981)

Professional ratings
Review scores
Source	Rating
Allmusic	3/5 stars
The Rolling Stone Jazz Record Guide	3/5 stars

Sweet Poppa Lou is a 1981 album by jazz saxophonist Lou Donaldson, his first recording for the Muse label, featuring Donaldson's quartet with Herman Foster, Calvin Hill, Idris Muhammad, and additional percussion on three tracks by Ralph Dorsey.

== Reception ==
The album was awarded three stars in an Allmusic review.

== Track listing ==
All compositions by Lou Donaldson except where noted

1. "Mambo Inn" (Mario Bauzá, Edgar Sampson, Bobby Woodlen)
2. "You'll Never Know" (Harry Warren, Mack Gordon)
3. "Mo' Gravy"
4. "If I Should Lose You" (Ralph Rainger, Leo Robin)
5. "Shuckin' Blues"
6. "Don't Take Your Love from Me" (Henry Nemo)

== Personnel ==
- Lou Donaldson - alto saxophone
- Herman Foster - piano
- Calvin Hill - bass
- Idris Muhammad - drums
- Ralph Dorsey - percussion (tracks 1–3)
