= Cole Slaw =

Studio album by Lou Donaldson
- Released: 1964
- Recorded: June 19, 1964
- Studio: RCA Recording Studios, New York City
- Genre: Jazz
- Label: Argo; LP-747
- Producer: Esmond Edwards

Lou Donaldson chronology
Possum Head (1964)	Cole Slaw (1964)	Rough House Blues (1964)

Professional ratings
Review scores
Source	Rating
Allmusic	3/5 stars

Cole Slaw is an album by jazz saxophonist Lou Donaldson recorded for the Argo label in 1964 and performed by Donaldson with pianist Herman Foster, bassist Earl May, drummer Bruno Carr, and congalero Ray Barretto.

The album was awarded 3 stars in an Allmusic review.

== Track listing ==
All compositions by Lou Donaldson except as indicated

1. "There Is No Greater Love" (Isham Jones, Marty Symes)
2. "Poinciana" (Nat Simon, Buddy Bernier)
3. "Cole Slaw" (aka "Sorghum Switch") (Jesse Stone)
4. "People Will Say We're in Love" (Richard Rodgers, Oscar Hammerstein II)
5. "Li'l Miss Fine"
6. "'O sole mio" (Eduardo Di Capua, Alfredo Mazzucchi, Giovanni Capurro)
7. "Skylark" (Hoagy Carmichael, Johnny Mercer)
8. "Soul Gumbo"
  - Recorded in NYC on June 19, 1964.

== Personnel ==
- Lou Donaldson - alto saxophone
- Herman Foster - piano
- Earl May - bass
- Bruno Carr - drums
- Ray Barretto - congas
