= Sassy Soul Strut =

Studio album by Lou Donaldson
- Released: 1973
- Recorded: April 17 & 18, 1973
- Genre: Jazz
- Label: Blue Note
- Producer: George Butler

Lou Donaldson chronology
Sophisticated Lou (1972)	Sassy Soul Strut (1973)	Sweet Lou (1974)

Professional ratings
Review scores
Source	Rating
AllMusic	2.5/5 stars

Sassy Soul Strut is an album by jazz saxophonist Lou Donaldson recorded for the Blue Note label featuring Donaldson with Thad Jones, Garnett Brown, Seldon Powell, Buddy Lucas, Paul Griffin, Horace Ott, Hugh McCracken, David Spinozza, John Tropea, Wilbur Bascomb, Bernard Purdie, Omar Clay, and Jack Jennings, with arrangements by George Butler.

The album was awarded 2½ stars in an AllMusic review by Jason Ankeny who stated "Sassy Soul Strut quickly settles comfortably into a light, accessible mode too lively to dismiss as smooth jazz but too mellow to pass as anything else. Butler's arrangements haven't dated particularly well, but the record's too innocuous and good-natured to qualify as an outright failure. It's simply forgettable, nothing more and nothing less".

== Track listing ==
All compositions by Lou Donaldson except as indicated

1. "Sanford and Son Theme (The Streetbeater)" (Quincy Jones) - 7:00
2. "Pillow Talk" (Michael Burton, Sylvia Robinson) - 4:52
3. "Sassy Soul Strut" - 5:00
4. "Good Morning Heartache" (Ervin Drake, Dan Fisher, Irene Higginbotham) - 2:32
5. "City, Country, City" - 9:10
6. "This Is Happiness" (Tadd Dameron) - 5:19
7. "Inner Space" - 6:58

- Recorded at Generation Sound Studios, NYC on April 17, 1973 (tracks 1, 6 & 7) and April 18, 1973 (tracks 2–5).

== Personnel ==
- Lou Donaldson - varitone alto saxophone
- Thad Jones - trumpet
- Garnett Brown - trombone
- Seldon Powell - tenor saxophone, flute
- Buddy Lucas - harmonica
- Paul Griffin - piano, electric piano, organ
- Horace Ott - electric piano
- Hugh McCracken, David Spinozza, John Tropea - electric guitar
- Wilbur Bascomb - electric bass
- Bernard Purdie - drums
- Omar Clay, Jack Jennings - percussion
- George Butler - arranger
