= Play the Right Thing =

Studio album by Lou Donaldson
- Released: 1991
- Recorded: December 19–20, 1990
- Studio: Giant Recording Studios
- Genre: Jazz
- Length: 49:47
- Label: Milestone

Lou Donaldson chronology
Live in Bologna (1984)	Play the Right Thing (1991)	Birdseed (1992)

Professional ratings
Review scores
Source	Rating
Allmusic	3/5 stars

Play the Right Thing is an album by jazz saxophonist Lou Donaldson, his first recording for the Milestone label, featuring Donaldson with Lonnie Smith, Peter Bernstein, Bernard Purdie, and Ralph Dorsey.

== Reception ==
The album was awarded 3 stars in an Allmusic review by Richard S. Ginell who states "As specifically indicated by the album's title, the title tune's bluesy cast, and Sweet Lou Donaldson's own determined liner notes, this CD aims to strike a blow for soul-jazz, a once-popular, then-maligned idiom newly returned from exile. That it does — with no frills, no apologies, and an idiomatic supporting cast... the CD achieves a comfortable level of competence without really grabbing hold of a groove and riding it the way Donaldson could in his Blue Note days".

== Track listing ==
All compositions by Lou Donaldson except as indicated

1. "Play the Right Thing" – 6:24
2. "Whiskey Drinkin' Woman" – 6:05
3. "Marmaduke" (Charlie Parker) – 6:47
4. "Harlem Nocturne" (Earle Hagen, Dick Rogers) – 5:50
5. "This is Happiness" (Tadd Dameron) – 7:55
6. "I Had the Craziest Dream" (Mack Gordon, Harry Warren) – 6:24
7. "The Masquerade is Over" (Herbert Magidson, Allie Wrubel) – 4:15
8. "Footpattin' Time" – 6:07

- Recorded in New York City on December 19 & 29, 1990 by Malcolm Addey.

== Personnel ==
- Lou Donaldson – alto saxophone, vocals
- Lonnie Smith – organ
- Peter Bernstein – guitar
- Bernard Purdie – drums
- Ralph Dorsey – congas
