= Wailing with Lou =

Studio album by the Lou Donaldson Quintet
- Released: June 1957
- Recorded: January 27, 1957
- Studio: Van Gelder Studio; Hackensack, New Jersey
- Genre: Jazz
- Length: 37:21
- Label: Blue Note; BLP 1545
- Producer: Alfred Lion

Lou Donaldson chronology
Quartet/Quintet/Sextet (1952)	Wailing with Lou (1957)	Swing and Soul (1957)

Wailing with Lou is an album by the Lou Donaldson Quintet, recorded on January 27, 1957 and released on Blue Note later that year. The quintet features trumpeter Donald Byrd and rhythm section Herman Foster, Peck Morrison and Art Taylor.

== Reception ==
Professional ratings
Review scores
Source	Rating
AllMusic	4/5 stars

The AllMusic review by Stephen Thomas Erlewine states, "There's nothing out of the ordinary here—just hard-driving bop and sensitive ballads, which are sure to please fans of the style."

== Track listing ==
All compositions by Lou Donaldson, except as noted.

=== Side 1 ===
1. "Caravan" (Duke Ellington, Irving Mills, Juan Tizol) – 5:58
2. "Old Folks" (Dedette Lee Hill, Willard Robison) – 6:22
3. "That Good Old Feeling" – 6:52

=== Side 2 ===
1. "Move It" – 5:57
2. "There Is No Greater Love" (Isham Jones, Marty Symes) – 6:54
3. "L.D. Blues" – 5:18

== Personnel ==
=== Lou Donaldson Quintet ===
- Lou Donaldson – alto saxophone
- Donald Byrd – trumpet
- Herman Foster – piano
- Peck Morrison – bass
- Art Taylor – drums

=== Technical personnel ===
- Alfred Lion – producer
- Rudy Van Gelder – recording engineer
- Reid Miles – design
- Francis Wolff – photography
- Ira Gitler – liner notes
