= Live in Bologna (Lou Donaldson album) =

Live album by Lou Donaldson
- Released: 1984
- Recorded: January 1984
- Venue: Bologna
- Genre: Jazz
- Label: Timeless

Lou Donaldson chronology
Back Street (1982)	Live in Bologna (1984)	Play the Right Thing (1990)

Professional ratings
Review scores
Source	Rating
Allmusic	3/5 stars

Live in Bologna is a live album by jazz saxophonist Lou Donaldson, his second recording for the Timeless label, featuring Donaldson's quartet with Herman Foster, Jeff Fuller, and Victor Jones.

== Reception ==
The album was awarded 3 stars in an Allmusic review by Steven Loewy who stated "the set as a whole has a joyous and even infectious exuberance that should provide an enjoyable, if light, listening experience".

== Track listing ==
All compositions by Lou Donaldson except as indicated

1. "Stella by Starlight" (Ned Washington, Victor Young) – 9:26
2. "Groovin' High" (Dizzy Gillespie) – 8:30
3. "Summertime" (George Gershwin, Ira Gershwin, DuBose Heyward) – 9:05
4. "Lou's Blues" – 9:21
5. "St. Thomas" (Sonny Rollins) – 6:11
6. "Star Eyes" (Gene DePaul, Don Raye) – 11:45

- Recorded in Bologna, Italy in January, 1984.

== Personnel ==
- Lou Donaldson – alto saxophone, vocals
- Herman Foster – piano
- Jeff Fuller – bass
- Victor Jones – drums
