= Forgotten Man (album) =

Studio album by Lou Donaldson
- Released: 1981
- Recorded: July 2, 1981
- Studio: Barigozzi Studio, Milano
- Genre: Jazz
- Label: Timeless

Lou Donaldson chronology
Sweet Poppa Lou (1981)	Forgotten Man (1981)	Back Street (1982)

Professional ratings
Review scores
Source	Rating
Allmusic	2.5/5 stars

Forgotten Man is an album by jazz saxophonist Lou Donaldson, his first recording for the Timeless label, featuring Donaldson's quartet with Herman Foster, Geoff Fuller, and Victor Jones.

== Reception ==
The album was awarded 2½ stars in an Allmusic review by Scott Yanow who stated "Although not essential, this album should easily please Lou Donaldson's fans, for it finds him in exuberant form".

== Track listing ==
All compositions by Lou Donaldson except as indicated

1. "Confirmation" (Charlie Parker) – 5:58
2. "Whiskey Drinkin' Woman" (Lou Donaldson, Leon Spencer) – 5:34
3. "This is Happiness" (Tadd Dameron) – 3:44
4. "Tracy" – 4:37
5. "Melancholy Baby" (Ernie Burnett, George Norton) – 6:52
6. "Don't Blame Me" (Dorothy Fields, Jimmy McHugh) – 5:15
7. "Exactly Like You" (Fields, McHugh) – 7:00
- Recorded in Milan, Italy on July 2, 1981.

== Personnel ==
- Lou Donaldson – alto saxophone, vocals
- Herman Foster – piano
- Geoff Fuller – bass
- Victor Jones – drums
