= Pitch a Boogie Woogie =

1948 musical comedy featurette

Pitch a Boogie Woogie is a musical comedy featurette made by Lord-Warner Pictures in North Carolina. It was produced for Black audience theaters and its performers were a mix of local talent and cast members from two traveling vaudeville shows, Winstead Mighty Minstrels, from Fayetteville, North Carolina, and Irvin C. Miller's Brown Skin Models, a New York-based troupe that began in Harlem in the 1920s. According to one source, the bookkeeper for Miller's Brown Skin Models had become stranded and they were added to the Winstead group as they played one-week stands in tobacco towns in the Carolinas. They were familiar to the filmmaker, John W. Warner, who operated a Black-audience theater, the Plaza, in a lively section of Greenville, North Carolina known as "the Block."

== Synopsis ==
John Warner, who was White, wrote and co-produced the movie with his brother Walter, who had changed his name to William Lord while living in New York. Lord is credited as director and composer of the movie's original songs. Warner also filmed commercials for Black businesses in the neighborhood for screening prior to his movies, and he filmed documentary-style footage of the neighborhood so that patrons might never know when they were going to appear on the big screen as part of a program. Warner also wrote another script in 1957 for an unproduced film about the successful integration of a Southern town's public schools. "Pitch a Boogie Woogie" was restored by the American Film Institute in 1985 and re-premiered on the campus of East Carolina University in 1986—its first ever screening before an integrated audience. Materials relating to the film are housed at East Carolina University in the John W. Warner Papers. The film played in 8 theaters in North Carolina.

Saxophonist Lou Donaldson performs on the soundtrack as part of the Rhythm Vets, who were hired to add music to the performances after Warner discovered that musical accompaniment provided by Don Dunning's orchestra and recorded during the singing and dancing performances he had filmed was not good enough to use in the movie. The Rhythm Vets, a regionally popular dance band from Greensboro, N.C., were hired to play the instrumental part of the soundtrack music. The Rhythm Vets, were veterans, composed of former members from the United States Navy B-1 Band. With most of its members originally from Greensboro, North Carolina, U.S. Navy B-1 Band made history as the first African Americans to serve in the modern Navy at ranks higher than a messman.

In 1988 the UNC Center for Public Television made a documentary called Boogie in Black and White, about the film and its rediscovery, restoration, and re-premiere.

== Revival ==
After the movie had made its debut and made its mark on films and history, Pitch A Boogie Woogie seemed to have disappeared. The movie would not be seen by anyone for nearly forty years. Due to the movie's disappearance and at the time of cinema only showing a film in cinemas one time and then not showing them again, the actors of the films went back to living the regular lives they had before and during the filming of the movie. A few of the actors would go on to be educators, either as a teacher or as soldiers in the U.S. Army. After some time during the 1970's the movie would be surprisingly found and rediscovered by a musician in Greenville named Bill Shepherd. After this the film would gain a massive amount of traction and start to become a main showing to film festivals across the nation as well as being shown in auditoriums. In 1991 the film would begin one of its first of college premiering as an event was held for it on the East Carolina University campus. The film was also shown in the downtown area of Greenville, North Carolina as well as having a showing for it at a film festival in Fayetteville, North Carolina.

== Outside of the movie ==
After the movies disappearance of Pitch a Boogie Woogie the actors had gone back to their normal lives. One of the actors known as Carl O. Foster Jr had helped to be a provider to the Pitch a Boogie Woogie soundtrack and after the movie had ended he went on to be an Educator. His jobs as an Educator involved being the principal of a school and at the time of his retirement he had the job of a Director for the Cultural Arts. For one of the other fellow actors, Herman L. Forbes, during his time on the set of Pitch a Boogie Woogie he would spend his time actively serving for the United States Army and gave all his contribution to the movie during a fifteen day leave. After the movie was done as well as his service to the Army he would continue to play music by joining the band of his church and would do so until having to live in a nursing home. Since then both members had died as well as few others who gave contribution to the movie, in 2018 a contributor for the movie by the name Calvin Morrow was interviewed and at the time he discussed how he felt being the last member of the movie crew to be alive.

== Sources ==
- Lee, Eleanor, "ALL THAT JAZZ." Fayetteville Observer, The (NC), sec. Living, 25 Feb. 1988. https://infoweb-newsbank-com
- Toppman, Lawrence. "PITCH A BOOGIE WOOGIE` - FIRST ALL-BLACK FILM IN N.C. LIVES AGAIN<." Charlotte Observer, The (NC), ONE-SIX ed., sec. LIVING, 23 Jan. 1989. https://infoweb-newsbank-com
- Fellers, Tracie, "CROWD FINDS BOOGIE WOOGIE` A LOT OF FUN." Charlotte Observer, The (NC), SIX ed., sec. GASTON OBSERVER, 25 Jan. 1989. https://infoweb-newsbank-com
- "EAST CAROLINA INSTITUTE SEEKING FILM RECORD OF NORTH CAROLINA." Greensboro News & Record, ROCKINGHAM ed., sec. LEDGER, 3 July 1991. https://infoweb-newsbank-com
- "MUSIC A BACKDROP TO TEACHER'S LIFE." Greensboro News & Record (NC), HIGH POINT/RANDOLPH ed., sec. TRIAD/STATE, 13 Aug. 2003. https://infoweb-newsbank-com
- "Free flicks to entice folks to downtown City kicks off latest series Friday night under the stars." Herald-Sun, The (Durham, NC), Final ed., sec. Durham, 22 July 2004. https://infoweb-newsbank-com
- "CARL O. FOSTER. JR.." Greensboro News & Record (NC), sec. News, 3 Jan. 2014. https://infoweb-newsbank-com
- "Breaking barriers, one note at a time." Greensboro News & Record (NC), sec. S, 11 Nov. 2018. https://infoweb-newsbank-com
