= Sentimental Journey (Lou Donaldson album) =

Studio album by Lou Donaldson
- Released: 1995
- Recorded: August 14–15, 1994
- Studio: RPM Studios, New York City
- Genre: Jazz
- Length: 47:22
- Label: Columbia
- Producer: Todd Barkan

Lou Donaldson chronology
Caracas (1993)	Sentimental Journey (1995)	Relaxing at Sea: Live on the QE2 (2000)

Professional ratings
Review scores
Source	Rating
Allmusic	4/5 stars

Sentimental Journey is an album by jazz saxophonist Lou Donaldson, his first release for the Columbia label, featuring Donaldson with Lonnie Smith, Peter Bernstein, and Fukushi Tainaka, with Ray Mantilla contributing percussion on three tracks.

The album was awarded 4 stars in an Allmusic review by Scott Yanow who states "Donaldson plays his usual mixture of blues, ballads and standards with a fine organ trio and the results are predictably swinging. The music could have been performed in 1965 but strangely enough the familiar style heard on this CD has not dated and still communicates. The enthusiasm of the musicians (who sound perfectly at home) has kept this popular idiom alive and sounding reasonably fresh".

== Track listing ==
All compositions by Lou Donaldson except as indicated

1. "What Now, My Love?" (Gilbert Bécaud, Pierre Delanoë, Carl Sigman) - 6:27
2. "Sentimental Journey" (Les Brown, Ben Homer, Bud Green) - 8:19
3. "What'll I Tell My Heart?" (Jack Lawrence, Peter Tinturin) - 7:02
4. "Messin' Around with C.P." - 5:55
5. "My Little Suede Shoes" (Charlie Parker) - 6:13
6. "Midnight Creeper" - 7:58
7. "Danny Boy" (Frederic Weatherly) - 5:49
8. "Peck Time" - 7:37

- Recorded in New York City on August 14 & 15, 1994.

== Personnel ==
- Lou Donaldson - alto saxophone
- Lonnie Smith - organ
- Peter Bernstein - guitar
- Fukushi Tainaka - drums
- Ray Mantilla - congas, bongos (tracks 1, 5 & 8)
