= Caracas (album) =

Studio album by Lou Donaldson
- Released: 1993
- Recorded: July 1993
- Studio: Nola Studios, New York City
- Genre: Jazz
- Length: 54:12
- Label: Milestone
- Producer: Bob Porter

Lou Donaldson chronology
Birdseed (1992)	Caracas (1993)	Sentimental Journey (1995)

Professional ratings
Review scores
Source	Rating
AllMusic	4/5 stars
The Penguin Guide to Jazz Recordings	2.5/4 stars

Caracas is an album by jazz saxophonist Lou Donaldson, his third recording for the Milestone label, featuring Donaldson with Lonnie Smith, Peter Bernstein, Kenny Washington, and Ralph Dorsey.

The album was awarded 4 stars in an AllMusic review by Alex Henderson, who states "Caracas was recorded in 1993, but it sounds like it could have been recorded 30 years earlier. Regardless, this CD is excellent... Is Caracas essential? Not quite, but it's still a highly rewarding album that will please die-hard soul-jazz enthusiasts".

== Track listing ==
All compositions by Lou Donaldson except as indicated

1. "Hot Dog" - 5:16
2. "Just a Dream" (Big Bill Broonzy, Jimmy Clanton) - 6:19
3. "Ornithology" (Charlie Parker) - 7:07
4. "I Don't Know Why (I Just Do)" (Fred E. Ahlert, Roy Turk) - 4:58
5. "Night Train" (Jimmy Forrest, Lewis Simpkins, Oscar Washington) - 9:49
6. "I Be Blue" - 5:55
7. "Caracas" - 7:32
8. "Lil' Darlin'" (Neal Hefti) - 7:16
  - Recorded in New York City in July 1993.

== Personnel ==
- Lou Donaldson - alto saxophone, vocals
- Lonnie Smith - organ
- Peter Bernstein - guitar
- Kenny Washington - drums
- Ralph Dorsey - congas
