= Eunice Peterson =

American geologist

- Peterson, from the 1922 yearbook of the University of Minnesota
- Born: April 6, 1900; Viroqua, Wisconsin, U.S.
- Died: June 18, 1988 (aged 88); Severna Park, Maryland, U.S.
- Other name: Eunice Peterson Garrett
- Occupations: Geologist, paleontologist, scientific librarian

Eunice Peterson Garrett (April 6, 1900 – June 18, 1988) was an American geologist, paleontologist, and scientific librarian. She was the first woman to earn a PhD in geology at the University of Minnesota.

== Early life and education ==
Peterson was born in Viroqua, Wisconsin, the daughter of Carl Bernard Peterson and Mattie Emiline Barney Peterson. Her father was a dentist. She graduated from the University of Minnesota in 1922, as the third woman to earn a bachelor's degree in geology there. She continued to earn a master's degree there in 1924, and in 1927 she was the first woman to earn a PhD in geology at the University of Minnesota. Her dissertation was a study of the Dresbach Formation. "She objects to her scientific achievements being viewed as thrilling experiences or exploits", reported one newspaper in 1925. Later in life she earned another master's degree, in library science, from Drexel University.

== Career ==
After college, Peterson taught briefly at Oberlin College. From 1924 to 1927 she was the first woman geologist at the Minnesota Geological Survey, and managed the Winchell Library of Geology. She curated the mineral and fossil collection at Princeton University in 1927. She oversaw the scientific library of the Buffalo Museum of Science in 1928 and 1929.

After she married, Peterson was a geology demonstrator at Bryn Mawr College, and worked for Biological Abstracts. She was a librarian at the Academy of Natural Sciences, and as a research librarian for the Foote Mineral Company.

Peterson was a member of the Paleontological Society and the Sigma Xi honor society.

== Publications ==
- "Block Faulting in the St. Croix Valley" (1927)
- "The Dresbach Formation in Minnesota" (1929, based on her dissertation)

== Personal life ==
Peterson married Milan Wayne Garrett in 1928. They had two daughters. She died in 1988, at the age of 88.
