= Blowing in the Wind (album) =

Studio album by Lou Donaldson
- Released: 1967
- Recorded: August 30, 1966
- Genre: Jazz
- Label: Cadet; LPS-789
- Producer: Esmond Edwards

Lou Donaldson chronology
| Fried Buzzard (1965) | Blowing in the Wind (1967) | Lou Donaldson at His Best (1966) |

Professional ratings
Review scores
| Source | Rating |
|---|---|
| Allmusic | 3/5 stars |

Blowing in the Wind is an album by jazz saxophonist Lou Donaldson recorded for the Cadet label in 1966 and performed by Donaldson with pianist Herman Foster, bassist Sam Jones, drummer Idris Muhammad and percussionist Richard Landrum.

== Reception ==
The album was awarded 3 stars in an Allmusic review by Jason Ankeny who states "Blowing in the Wind is perhaps the most curious and oddly compelling of the dates Lou Donaldson cut for Cadet during his mid-'60s exile from the Blue Note stable — a mish-mash of contemporary pop hits, stage favorites, and standards all packaged in a bizarrely Picasso-like cover, the record's inconsistencies and contradictions make for an experience that's unique even in the context of Esmond Edwards erratic and eclectic oeuvre".

== Track listing ==
All compositions by Lou Donaldson except as indicated

1. "Herman's Mambo" (Herman Foster)
2. "Hello, Dolly!" (Jerry Herman)
3. "Blowin' in the Wind" (Bob Dylan)
4. "Who Can I Turn To (When Nobody Needs Me)" (Leslie Bricusse, Anthony Newley)
5. "The Wheeler Dealer"
6. "Passing Zone"
7. "Relaxing in Blue"

Recorded at RCA Studios NYC on August 30, 1966

== Personnel ==
- Lou Donaldson - alto saxophone
- Herman Foster - piano
- Sam Jones - bass
- Leo Morris - drums
- Richard Landrum - congas

== Production ==
- Esmond Edwards - producer
