= Possum Head =

Studio album by Lou Donaldson
- Released: 1964
- Recorded: January 28, 1964
- Studio: United Recording Studios, Los Angeles
- Genre: Jazz
- Label: Argo; LP-734
- Producer: Esmond Edwards

Lou Donaldson chronology
Signifyin' (1963)	Possum Head (1964)	Cole Slaw (1964)

Professional ratings
Review scores
Source	Rating
Allmusic	4/5 stars

Possum Head is an album by jazz saxophonist Lou Donaldson recorded for the Argo label in 1964 and performed by Donaldson with trumpeter Bill Hardman, organist “Big” John Patton, guitarist Ray Crawford, drummer Ben Dixon and percussionist Cleopas Morris.

== Reception ==
The album was awarded 4 stars in an Allmusic review by Jason Ankeny who states "Patton's sublimely funky grooves effectively sand away Donaldson's wooden edges to create rolling melodic contours... Donaldson circles around the hard-driving soul-jazz sensibilities of his later records but never quite commits, instead favoring lyrical solos well-matched to standards... An engaging and underrated record".

== Track listing ==
All compositions by Lou Donaldson except as indicated

1. "Possum Head" - 3:15
2. "Laura" (David Raksin) - 4:42
3. "Midnight Soul" - 4:57
4. "Bye Bye Blackbird" (Mort Dixon, Ray Henderson) - 6:28
5. "Persimmon Tree" - 5:35
6. "Frenesí" (Alberto Dominguez, Leonard Whitcup) - 6:15
7. "Man with a Horn" (Eddie DeLange, Jack Jenney, Bonnie Lake) - 5:04
8. "Secret Love" (Sammy Fain, Paul Francis Webster) - 5:43

== Personnel ==
- Lou Donaldson - alto saxophone
- Bill Hardman - trumpet
- Ray Crawford - guitar
- Big John Patton - organ
- Ben Dixon - drums
- Cleopas "Mopedido" Morris - percussion
