= Good Gracious! =

Studio album by Lou Donaldson
- Released: Early June 1964
- Recorded: January 24, 1963
- Studio: Van Gelder Studio, Englewood Cliffs, NJ
- Genre: Jazz
- Length: 41:59
- Label: Blue Note; BST 84125
- Producer: Alfred Lion

Lou Donaldson chronology
The Natural Soul (1962)	Good Gracious! (1964)	Signifyin' (1963)

Professional ratings
Review scores
Source	Rating
Allmusic	3.5/5 stars
All About Jazz	(favorable)
The Penguin Guide to Jazz Recordings	3/4 stars

Good Gracious! is an album by jazz saxophonist Lou Donaldson recorded for the Blue Note label in 1963 and performed by Donaldson with Grant Green, Big John Patton, and Ben Dixon.

== Reception ==
The album was awarded 3½ stars in an Allmusic review by Stephen Thomas Erlewine who states "Donaldson's tone is richer and fuller than it is on many of his early-'60s records, and he really connects with the laid-back R&B grooves and soul-jazz vamps on Good Gracious, turning in melodic, memorable solos... Good Gracious still falls prey to some of the lazy tempos that pop up on most Lou Donaldson records, but it remains one of his finest soul-jazz sessions". The Penguin Guide to Jazz Recordings describes the album as one of Donaldson's best, in part because of the contributions from Patton and Green.

== Track listing ==
All compositions are written by Lou Donaldson, except where noted.

No.	Title	Writer(s)	Length
1.	"Bad John"		8:18
2.	"The Holy Ghost"		8:38
3.	"Cherry"	Don Redman	5:17
4.	"Caracas"		7:19
5.	"Good Gracious"		6:52
6.	"Don't Worry 'Bout Me"	Rube Bloom, Ted Koehler	5:35

== Personnel ==
- Lou Donaldson - alto saxophone
- Grant Green - guitar
- Big John Patton - organ
- Ben Dixon - drums
