= The Time Is Right (Lou Donaldson album) =

Studio album by Lou Donaldson
- Released: Early April 1960
- Recorded: October 31, 1959; November 28, 1959
- Studio: Van Gelder Studio; Englewood Cliffs, New Jersey
- Genre: Jazz
- Length: 37:01
- Label: Blue Note; BLP 4025
- Producer: Alfred Lion

Lou Donaldson chronology
LD+3 (1959)	The Time Is Right (1960)	Sunny Side Up (1960)

The Time Is Right is an album by American jazz saxophonist Lou Donaldson recorded on October 31 and November 28, 1959 and released on Blue Note the following year.

== Release history ==
It was released on CD only in Japan.

== Reception ==
Professional ratings
Review scores
Source	Rating
AllMusic	3/5 stars

AllMusic awarded the album 3 stars.

== Track listing ==
Side 1
No.	Title	Writer(s)	Date recorded	Length
1.	"Lou's Blues"	Donaldson	October 31, 1959	5:55
2.	"Be My Love"	Nicholas Brodszky; Sammy Cahn	October 31, 1959	5:45
3.	"Idaho"	Jesse Stone	November 28, 1959	5:10
4.	"The Nearness of You"	Hoagy Carmichael; Ned Washington	October 31, 1959	4:42

Side 2
No.	Title	Writer(s)	Date recorded	Length
1.	"Mack the Knife"	Marc Blitzstein; Bertolt Brecht; Kurt Weill	October 31, 1959	5:17
2.	"Crosstown Shuffle"	Donaldson	October 31, 1959	5:15
3.	"Tangerine"	Johnny Mercer; Victor Schertzinger	October 31, 1959	4:57

== Personnel ==
=== Musicians ===
==== October 31, 1959 ====
- Lou Donaldson – alto saxophone
- Blue Mitchell – trumpet
- Horace Parlan – piano
- Laymon Jackson – bass
- Dave Bailey – drums
- Ray Barretto – congas

==== November 28, 1959 ====
- Lou Donaldson – alto saxophone
- Blue Mitchell – trumpet
- Horace Parlan – piano
- Sam Jones – bass
- Al Harewood – drums

=== Technical personnel ===
- Alfred Lion – producer
- Rudy Van Gelder – recording engineer, mastering
- Reid Miles – design
- Francis Wolff – photography
- Ira Gitler – technical personnel
