= Birdseed (album) =

Studio album by Lou Donaldson
- Released: 1992
- Recorded: April 28–29, 1992
- Genre: Jazz
- Length: 49:21
- Label: Milestone
- Producer: Bob Porter

Lou Donaldson chronology
Play the Right Thing (1990)	Birdseed (1992)	Caracas (1993)

Professional ratings
Review scores
Source	Rating
Allmusic	4/5 stars

Birdseed is an album by jazz saxophonist Lou Donaldson, his second recording for the Milestone label, featuring Donaldson with David Braham, Peter Bernstein, Fukushi Tainaka, and Ralph Dorsey.

The album was awarded 4 stars in an Allmusic review by Alex Henderson who states "Birdseed falls short of essential but is inspired and swinging".

== Track listing ==
All compositions by Lou Donaldson except as indicated

1. "Cherry" (Don Redman) - 4:33
2. "Walkin' Again" - 6:56
3. "Pennies from Heaven" (Johnny Burke, Arthur Johnston) - 6:29
4. "Red Top" (Lionel Hampton, Ben Kynard) - 8:12
5. "Blue Bossa" (Kenny Dorham) - 5:45
6. "Back Door Blues" (Eddie "Cleanhead" Vinson) - 4:59
7. "Dorothy" (Rudy Nichols) - 5:22
8. "Birdseed" - 6:44
  - Recorded in New York City on April 28 & 29, 1992.

== Personnel ==
- Lou Donaldson - alto saxophone
- David Braham - organ
- Peter Bernstein - guitar
- Fukushi Tainaka - drums
- Ralph Dorsey - congas
