= Sunny Side Up (Lou Donaldson album) =

Studio album by Lou Donaldson
- Released: Early January 1961
- Recorded: February 5 & 28, 1960; Van Gelder Studio, Englewood Cliffs
- Genre: Jazz
- Length: 38:43 original LP; 44:22 CD reissue
- Label: Blue Note; BST 84036
- Producer: Alfred Lion

Lou Donaldson chronology
The Time is Right (1959)	Sunny Side Up (1961)	Midnight Sun (1960)

Professional ratings
Review scores
Source	Rating
Down Beat	3/5 stars
Allmusic	3/5 stars

Sunny Side Up is an album by jazz saxophonist Lou Donaldson recorded for the Blue Note label and performed by Donaldson with Bill Hardman, Horace Parlan, Sam Jones, Al Harewood, with Laymon Jackson replacing Jones on four tracks.

== Reception ==
The album was awarded 3 stars in an Allmusic review by Stephen Thomas Erlewine, who states: "Sunny Side Up is closer to hard bop than the straight-ahead bop that characterized Lou Donaldson's '50s Blue Note records. There's a bit more soul to the songs here.... Even the uptempo numbers sound relaxed, never fiery. Despite the general smoothness of the session, Donaldson stumbles a little but there's enough solid material to make Sunny Side Up a worthwhile listen for fans of Donaldson and early-'60s hard bop."

== Track listing ==
1. "Blues for J.P." (Horace Parlan) - 5:39
2. "The Man I Love" (Gershwin, Gershwin) - 5:14
3. "Politely" (Bill Hardman) - 5:52
4. "It's You or No One" (Cahn, Styne) - 3:58
5. "The Truth" (Lou Donaldson) - 5:21
6. "Goose Grease" (Donaldson) - 6:07
7. "Softly, As in a Morning Sunrise" (Oscar Hammerstein II, Sigmund Romberg) - 6:32
8. "Way Down Upon the Swanee River" (Stephen Foster) - 5:39 Bonus track on CD reissue

Recorded on February 5 (tracks 3 & 6–8) and February 28 (tracks 1–2 & 4–5), 1960.

== Personnel ==
- Lou Donaldson - alto saxophone
- Horace Parlan - piano
- Bill Hardman - trumpet (tracks 1–4, 6–8)
- Laymon Jackson - bass (tracks 1–2, 4–5)
- Sam Jones - bass (tracks 3, 6–8)
- Al Harewood - drums

== Production ==
- Alfred Lion - producer
- Reid Miles - design
- Rudy Van Gelder - recording engineer
- Francis Wolff - photography
