= Gravy Train (Lou Donaldson album) =

Studio album by Lou Donaldson
- Released: Early July 1962
- Recorded: April 27, 1961
- Studio: Van Gelder Studio, Englewood Cliffs, NJ
- Genre: Jazz
- Length: 43:08 original LP
- Label: Blue Note; BST 84079
- Producer: Alfred Lion

Lou Donaldson chronology
Here 'Tis (1961)	Gravy Train (1962)	A Man with a Horn (1961)

Professional ratings
Review scores
Source	Rating
Allmusic	3.5/5 stars
The Penguin Guide to Jazz Recordings	3/4 stars

Gravy Train is an album by jazz saxophonist Lou Donaldson recorded for the Blue Note label in 1961 and performed by Donaldson with pianist Herman Foster, bassist Ben Tucker, drummer Dave Bailey and percussionist Alec Dorsey.

== Reception ==
The album was awarded 3½ stars in an Allmusic review by Steve Huey who states "Gravy Train is a fine, if not quite exceptional record from Lou Donaldson's initial soul-jazz phase of the early '60s... Donaldson's playing is pleasant, and the rest of the supporting group maintains a steady groove throughout".

== Track listing ==
All compositions by Lou Donaldson except where noted

1. "Gravy Train" - 8:14
2. "South of the Border" (Carr, Kennedy) - 5:31
3. "Polka Dots and Moonbeams" (Burke, Van Heusen) - 4:59
4. "Avalon" (DeSylva, Jolson, Rose) - 4:15
5. "Candy" (Mack David, Kramer, Whitney) - 9:18
6. "Twist Time" - 6:47
7. "Glory of Love" (Billy Hill) - 4:04

Bonus tracks on CD:

8. "Gravy Train" [Alternate Take] - 7:30
9. "Glory of Love" [Alternate Take] - 3:49

== Personnel ==
- Lou Donaldson - alto saxophone
- Herman Foster - piano
- Ben Tucker - bass
- Dave Bailey - drums
- Alec Dorsey - congas (1, 2 & 4–9)
