= Hot Dog (Lou Donaldson album) =

Studio album by Lou Donaldson
- Released: Late August 1969
- Recorded: April 25, 1969
- Studio: Van Gelder Studio, Englewood Cliffs
- Genre: Jazz-funk
- Length: 36:53
- Label: Blue Note
- Producer: Francis Wolff

Lou Donaldson chronology
Say It Loud! (1968)	Hot Dog (1969)	Everything I Play is Funky (1970)

Professional ratings
Review scores
Source	Rating
Allmusic	2.5/5 stars

Hot Dog is an album by jazz saxophonist Lou Donaldson recorded for the Blue Note label in 1969 and featuring Donaldson with Ed Williams, Charles Earland, Melvin Sparks, and Leo Morris. The album features Donaldson using the varitone amplification system for his saxophone.

== Chart performance ==
The album debuted on Billboard magazine's Top LP's chart in the issue dated October 4, 1969, peaking at No. 158 during a six-week run on the chart.

== Critical reception ==
The album was awarded 2 ½ stars in an AllMusic review by Steve Huey, who states:

A wildly erratic slice of funky soul-jazz in keeping with Lou Donaldson's late-'60s commercial accessibility, Hot Dog isn't a total washout, but it's just as hit-and-miss [sic] as many of Donaldson's albums from the era (even if you are a fan of the style)... Hot Dog does have some worthwhile moments; it's just a pity the overall finished product isn't more consistent".

== Track listing ==
All compositions by Lou Donaldson except as indicated

1. "Who's Making Love?" (Homer Banks, Bettye Crutcher, Don Davis, Raymond Jackson) – 6:46
2. "Turtle Walk" – 7:56
3. "Bonnie" (Tommy Turrentine) – 4:56
4. "Hot Dog" – 10:45
5. "It's Your Thing" (Rudolph Isley, O'Kelly Isley, Ronald Isley) – 8:59

== Personnel ==
- Lou Donaldson - varitone alto saxophone, vocals
- Ed Williams - trumpet
- Charles Earland - Hammond organ
- Melvin Sparks - guitar
- Leo Morris - drums

== Charts ==
Chart (1969)	Peak position
US Billboard Top LPs	158
