= Musty Rusty =

Studio album by Lou Donaldson
- Released: 1965
- Recorded: June 3, 1965
- Studio: Van Gelder Studio, Englewood Cliffs, NJ
- Genre: Jazz
- Label: Argo
- Producer: Esmond Edwards

Lou Donaldson chronology
Rough House Blues (1964)	Musty Rusty (1965)	Fried Buzzard (1965)

Musty Rusty is an album by jazz saxophonist Lou Donaldson recorded for the Cadet label in 1965 and performed by Donaldson with trumpeter Bill Hardman, organist Billy Gardner, guitarist Grant Green, and drummer Ben Dixon.

== Reception ==
Professional ratings
Review scores
Source	Rating
Allmusic	4/5 stars
DownBeat	3.5/5 stars

The album was awarded 4 stars and the Allmusic review by Jason Ankeny states "Musty Rusty follows in much the same vein as Lou Donaldson's previous LPs for Blue Note... Donaldson originals like "Hippity Hop" and the title tune crackle with energy, and the melodic ingenuity of Green's guitar solos astounds". It received a positive review in Cash Box, with the review concluding the "title track is six minutes of jazz pleasure and the following five don’t diminish the thrill". Critic Dan Morgenstern, writing for DownBeat magazine, gave the album 3.5 stars out of 5.

== Track listing ==
All compositions by Lou Donaldson except where noted

1. "Musty Rusty" - 6:06
2. "Midnight Sun" (Sonny Burke, Lionel Hampton, Johnny Mercer) - 4:48
3. "Hipty Hop" - 5:20
4. "The Space Walk" (Ben Dixon) - 6:10
5. "Ha' Mercy" - 5:24
6. "Cherry Pink (and Apple Blossom White)" (Louis Guglielmi) - 5:24

== Personnel ==
- Lou Donaldson - alto saxophone
- Bill Hardman - trumpet
- Grant Green - guitar
- Billy Gardner - Hammond B3 organ
- Ben Dixon - drums
