= Blues Walk =

Studio album by Lou Donaldson
- Released: 1958
- Recorded: July 28, 1958
- Studio: Van Gelder Studio; Hackensack, NJ
- Genre: Jazz
- Label: Blue Note; BLP 1593
- Producer: Alfred Lion

Lou Donaldson chronology
Lou Takes Off (1957)	Blues Walk (1958)	Light-Foot (1958)

Blues Walk is an album by American jazz saxophonist Lou Donaldson, recorded on July 28, 1958 and released on Blue Note later that year.

== Reception ==
Professional ratings
Review scores
Source	Rating
AllMusic	5/5 stars
The Penguin Guide to Jazz Recordings	2.5/4 stars

The AllMusic review by Steve Huey called the album Donaldson's "undisputed masterpiece".

== Track listing ==
All tracks are written by Lou Donaldson, except as noted.

Side 1
No.	Title	Writer(s)	Length
1.	"Blues Walk"		6:44
2.	"Move"	Denzil Best	5:54
3.	"The Masquerade Is Over"	Herb Magidson; Allie Wrubel	5:54

Side 2
No.	Title	Writer(s)	Length
1.	"Play Ray"		5:32
2.	"Autumn Nocturne"	Josef Myrow; Kim Gannon	4:55
3.	"Callin' All Cats"		5:15

== Personnel ==
=== Musicians ===
- Lou Donaldson – alto saxophone
- Herman Foster – piano
- Peck Morrison – bass
- Dave Bailey – drums
- Ray Barretto – congas

=== Technical personnel ===
- Alfred Lion – producer
- Rudy Van Gelder – recording engineer, mastering
- Francis Wolff – photography
- Ira Gitler – liner notes

== Charts ==
2022 chart performance for Blues Walk
Chart (2022)	Peak position
German Albums (Offizielle Top 100)	98
