= Quartet/Quintet/Sextet =

Compilation album by Lou Donaldson
- Released: 1957
- Recorded: June 20, 1952; November 19, 1952; August 22, 1954
- Studio: WOR Studios, NYC; Van Gelder Studio, Hackensack, New Jersey
- Genre: Jazz
- Length: 36:50
- Label: Blue Note; BLP 1537
- Producer: Alfred Lion

Lou Donaldson chronology
Quartet/Quintet/Sextet (1957)	Wailing with Lou (1957)

Professional ratings
Review scores
Source	Rating
AllMusic	4.5/5 stars

Quartet/Quintet/Sextet is an album by American jazz saxophonist Lou Donaldson recorded on June 20 and November 19, 1952 and August 22, 1954 and released on Blue Note in 1957. The quartet features rhythm section Horace Silver, Gene Ramey and Art Taylor; the quintet adds trumpeter Blue Mitchell. The sextet features a new lineup, with brass section Kenny Dorham and Matthew Gee and rhythm section Elmo Hope, Percy Heath and Art Blakey.

== Background ==
The sessions were originally released on New Faces, New Sounds: Lou Donaldson–Clifford Brown (1953, BLP 5021) and Lou Donaldson Sextet, Volume 2 (1954, BLP 5055), respectively.

== Reception ==
The AllMusic review by Stephen Thomas Erlewine states, "While Donaldson's tone isn't quite as full as it would be within just five years, he impresses with his bold, speedy technique and fine phrasing. He doesn't play anything out of the ordinary, but he plays it very, very well, and his playing is enhanced by the three stellar bands that support him on these sessions... Everyone plays in a straight bop and hard bop tradition, contributing fine performances to a strong debut effort by Donaldson."

== Track listing ==
All tracks are written by Lou Donaldson, except as noted.

Side 1
No.	Title	Writer(s)	Length
1.	"If I Love Again"	Ben Oakland; Jack Murray
2.	"Down Home"
3.	"The Best Things in Life Are Free"	Buddy DeSylva; Lew Brown; Ray Henderson
4.	"Lou's Blues"
5.	"Cheek to Cheek"	Irving Berlin
6.	"Sweet Juice"	Horace Silver

Side 2
No.	Title	Writer(s)	Length
1.	"The Stroller"
2.	"Roccus"	Silver
3.	"Caracas"
4.	"Moe's Bluff"	Elmo Hope

=== CD reissues ===
No.	Title	Date recorded	Length
1.	"Roccus" (alternate take)	June 20, 1952	3:22
2.	"Roccus"	June 20, 1952	3:22
3.	"Cheek to Cheek" (alternate take)	June 20, 1952	2:49
4.	"Lou's Blues" (alternate take)	June 20, 1952	3:31
5.	"Lou's Blues"	June 20, 1952	3:42
6.	"Cheek to Cheek"	June 20, 1952	2:58
7.	"The Things We Did Last Summer"	June 20, 1952	3:16
8.	"Sweet Juice"	November 19, 1952	3:26
9.	"Down Home"	November 19, 1952	3:17
10.	"The Best Things in Life Are Free"	November 19, 1952	3:20
11.	"If I Love Again"	November 19, 1952	2:36
12.	"Caracas"	August 22, 1954	5:58
13.	"The Stroller"	August 22, 1954	5:34
14.	"Moe's Bluff"	August 22, 1954	5:05
15.	"After You've Gone"	August 22, 1954	4:34

== Personnel ==
=== Musicians ===
==== June 20, 1952 ====
- Lou Donaldson – alto saxophone
- Horace Silver – piano
- Gene Ramey – bass
- Art Taylor – drums
  - recorded at WOR Studios, NYC

==== November 19, 1952 ====
- Lou Donaldson – alto saxophone
- Blue Mitchell – trumpet
- Horace Silver – piano
- Gene Ramey – bass
- Art Taylor – drums
  - recorded at WOR Studios, NYC

==== August 22, 1954 ====
- Lou Donaldson – alto saxophone
- Kenny Dorham – trumpet
- Matthew Gee – trombone
- Elmo Hope – piano
- Percy Heath – bass
- Art Blakey – drums
  - recorded at Van Gelder Studio, Hackensack, NJ

=== Technical personnel ===
- Alfred Lion – producer
- Rudy Van Gelder – recording engineer
- Reid Miles – design
- Francis Wolff – photography
- Leonard Feather – liner notes
