= Lush Life (Lou Donaldson album) =

Studio album by Lou Donaldson
- Released: 1980
- Recorded: January 20, 1967
- Studio: Van Gelder Studio, Englewood Cliffs, NJ
- Genre: Jazz
- Length: 35:23
- Label: Blue Note; GXF 3068
- Producer: Alfred Lion

Lou Donaldson chronology
Lou Donaldson At His Best (1966)	Lush Life (1980)	Alligator Bogaloo (1967)

Sweet Slumber cover

Professional ratings
Review scores
Source	Rating
Allmusic	4.5/5 stars
All About Jazz	(favorable)
All About Jazz	(favorable)
The Penguin Guide to Jazz Recordings	3/4 stars

Lush Life (also released as Sweet Slumber) is an album by jazz saxophonist Lou Donaldson recorded for the Blue Note label in 1967 and featuring Donaldson with Freddie Hubbard, Garnett Brown, Jerry Dodgion, Wayne Shorter, Pepper Adams, McCoy Tyner, Ron Carter, and Al Harewood performing arrangements by Duke Pearson. Due to the success of Donaldson's Alligator Bogaloo (1967) the album was not released until 1980 in Japan under the title Sweet Slumber and then finally released decades later internationally.

== Reception ==
The album was awarded 4½ stars in an Allmusic review by Stephen Thomas Erlewine, who states: "With its plush arrangements and unabashedly pretty melodies, Lush Life stands in stark contrast to most everything else he cut in the '60s. There are no blues, no stabs at soul-jazz grooves, no hard bop — only sweet, sensitive renditions of romantic standards. Donaldson shone on ballads before, but it's nevertheless surprising how successful he is on this set of slow love songs. His tone is full and elegant — it's easy to get lost in his rich readings of these familiar melodies, as well as his slyly seductive improvisations".

== Track listing ==
1. "Sweet Slumber" (Lucky Millinder, Al J. Neiburg, Henri Woode) - 5:56
2. "You've Changed" (Bill Carey, Carl T. Fischer - 4:23
3. "The Good Life" (Sacha Distel, Jack Reardon) - 4:53
4. "Stardust" (Hoagy Carmichael) - 3:40
5. "What Will I Tell My Heart" (Irving Gordon, Jack Lawrence, Peter Tinturin) - 4:25
6. "It Might as Well Be Spring" (Oscar Hammerstein II, Richard Rodgers) - 5:58
7. "Sweet and Lovely" (Gus Arnheim, Jules LeMare, Harry Tobias) - 5:58 Bonus track on CD

== Personnel ==
- Lou Donaldson - alto saxophone
- Freddie Hubbard - trumpet
- Garnett Brown - trombone
- Jerry Dodgion - alto saxophone, flute
- Wayne Shorter - tenor saxophone
- Pepper Adams - baritone saxophone
- McCoy Tyner - piano
- Ron Carter - bass
- Al Harewood - drums
- Duke Pearson - arranger
