= Alligator Bogaloo =

Studio album by Lou Donaldson
- Released: August 1967
- Recorded: April 7, 1967
- Studio: Van Gelder Studio, Englewood Cliffs, NJ
- Genre: Jazz, Soul Blues
- Length: 35:38
- Label: Blue Note; BST 84263
- Producer: Alfred Lion

Lou Donaldson chronology
Lush Life (1967)	Alligator Bogaloo (1967)	Mr. Shing-A-Ling (1967)

Alligator Bogaloo is an album by jazz saxophonist Lou Donaldson recorded for the Blue Note label in 1967 and featuring Donaldson with Melvin Lastie, Lonnie Smith, George Benson, and Leo Morris (later to be better known as Idris Muhammad).

The success of the title track surprised Donaldson: "[W]e made the date and we were three minutes short. I said we don't have no more material. And the guy said just play anything for three minutes so we can fill out the time. So I just made the riff and naturally the guys could follow it. That's the only damn thing that sold on the record."

== Chart performance ==
The album debuted on Billboard magazine's Top LP's chart in the issue dated October 7, 1967, becoming his first album to chart in 4 years and peaking at No. 141 during an eleven-week run on the chart.

== Reception ==
Professional ratings
Review scores
Source	Rating
Allmusic	4/5 stars

The album was awarded 4 stars in an Allmusic review by Al Campbell who states "Alligator Bogaloo is one example of Lou Donaldson's successful combinations of hard bop and soul-jazz".

== Track listing ==
All compositions by Lou Donaldson except as noted

1. "Alligator Bogaloo" - 6:57
2. "One Cylinder" (Freddie McCoy) - 6:48
3. "The Thang" - 3:34
4. "Aw Shucks!" (Lonnie Smith) - 7:23
5. "Rev. Moses" - 6:27
6. "I Want a Little Girl" (Murray Mencher, Billy Moll) - 4:29

== Personnel ==
- Lou Donaldson - alto saxophone
- Melvin Lastie - cornet (#1–5)
- Lonnie Smith - organ
- George Benson - guitar
- Leo Morris - drums

== Charts ==
Chart (1967)	Peak position
US Billboard Top LPs	141
