= Lou Donaldson =

American jazz saxophonist (1926–2024)

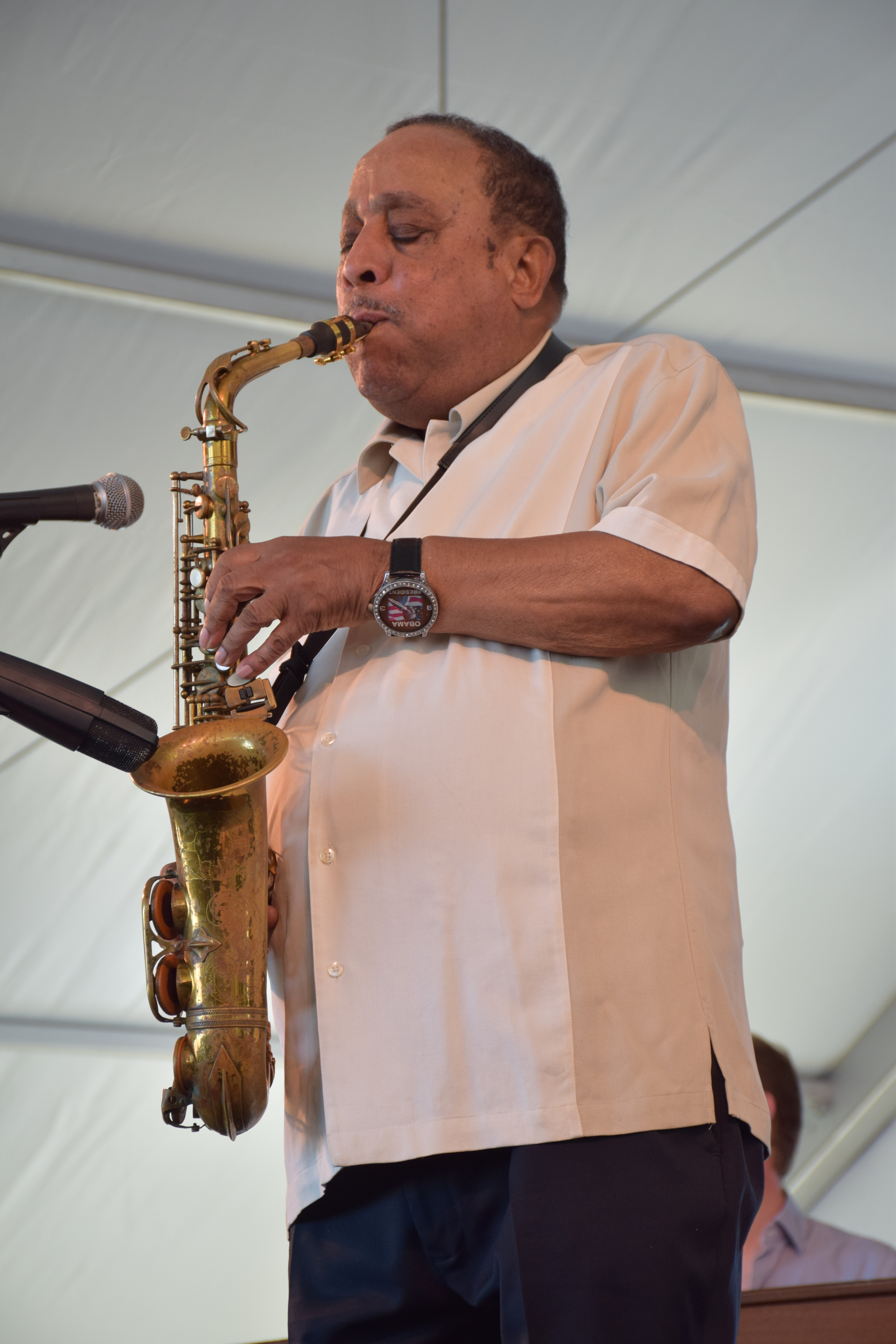
- Donaldson in 2015

Background information
- Born: Louis Andrew Donaldson Jr. November 1, 1926; Badin, North Carolina, U.S.
- Died: November 9, 2024 (aged 98) Daytona Beach, Florida, U.S.
- Education: North Carolina A&T
- Genres: Bebop; hard bop; jazz blues; soul jazz
- Occupations: Bandleader; composer; saxophonist
- Instrument: Alto saxophone
- Works: Lou Donaldson discography
- Years active: 1952–2017
- Website: loudonaldson.com

Louis Andrew Donaldson Jr. (November 1, 1926 – November 9, 2024) was an American jazz alto saxophonist. He was best known for his soulful, bluesy approach to playing the alto saxophone, although in his formative years, he was heavily influenced by Charlie Parker, as were many during the bebop era.

== Early life ==
Donaldson was born in Badin, North Carolina, United States, on November 1, 1926. He attended North Carolina Agricultural and Technical State University in Greensboro, in the early 1940s. He enlisted in the U.S. Navy during World War II and was trained at the Great Lakes bases in Chicago, where he was introduced to bop music in the lively club scene.

== Career ==
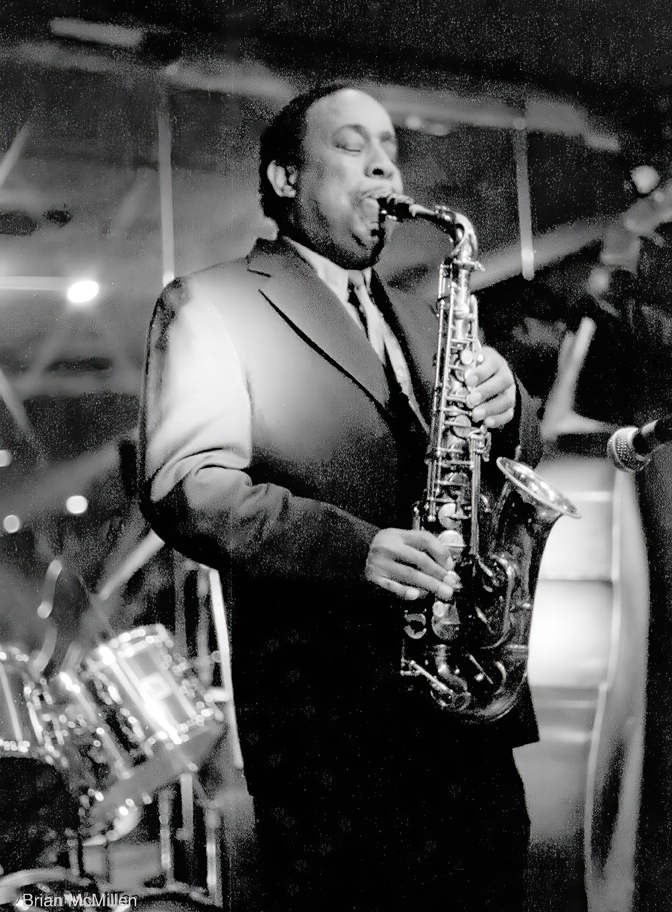
Donaldson at the V.I.S. Club, on Divisadero Street, San Francisco, in June 1984

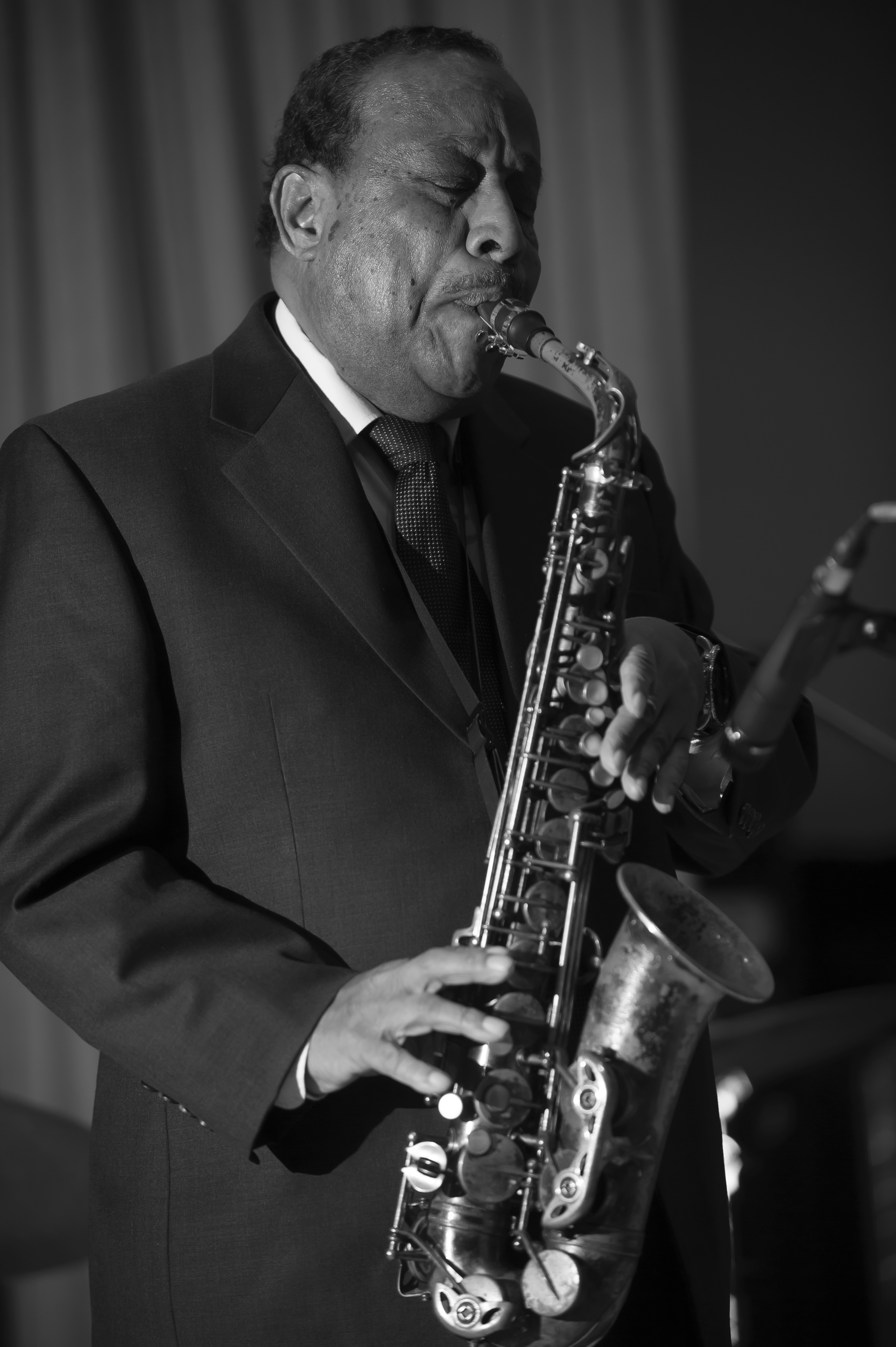
Donaldson in Buffalo, New York, 2009

At the war's conclusion, Donaldson returned to Greensboro, where he worked club dates with the Rhythm Vets, a combo composed of A&T students who had served in the U.S. Navy. The band recorded the soundtrack to a musical comedy featurette, Pitch a Boogie Woogie, in Greenville, North Carolina, in the summer of 1947. The movie had a limited run at black-audience theatres in 1948, but its production company, Lord-Warner Pictures, folded and never made another film. Pitch a Boogie Woogie was restored by the American Film Institute in 1985 and re-premiered on the campus of East Carolina University in Greenville the following year. Donaldson and the surviving members of the Vets performed a reunion concert after the film's showing. In the documentary made about Pitch by UNC-TV, Boogie in Black and White, Donaldson and his musical cohorts recall the film's making—he originally believed that he had played clarinet on the soundtrack. A short piece of concert footage from a gig in Fayetteville, North Carolina, is included in the documentary.

Donaldson's first jazz recordings were with bop musicians Milt Jackson and Thelonious Monk in 1952, and he participated in several small groups with other prominent jazz musicians, such as trumpeter Blue Mitchell, pianist Horace Silver, and drummer Art Blakey. In 1953, he also recorded sessions with the trumpeter Clifford Brown, and with Philly Joe Jones. He was a member of Art Blakey's Quintet for the hard bop recording sessions at Birdland on February 21, 1954, which would yield the A Night at Birdland albums for Blue Note Records.

He was inducted into the North Carolina Music Hall of Fame on October 11, 2012. Also in 2012, he was named a NEA Jazz Master by the National Endowment for the Arts.

== Retirement and death ==
In 2018, Donaldson declared himself retired, having performed his final shows in 2017. On November 2, 2021, he made a public appearance at a 95th birthday tribute show at Dizzy's Club in Manhattan, New York City. He appeared at his 96th and 97th birthday tribute shows in 2022 and 2023, but opted not to travel to New York City for his 98th birthday celebration, due to a bout of pneumonia. Shortly afterward, he died from pneumonia at a hospital in Daytona Beach, Florida, on November 9, 2024.

== Discography ==
- Quartet/Quintet/Sextet (1952)
- Wailing with Lou (1957)
- Swing and Soul (1957)
- Jimmy Smith Trio + LD (1957)
- Lou Takes Off (1957)
- Blues Walk (1958)
- Light-Foot (1958)
- LD + 3 (1959)
- The Time Is Right (1959)
- Sunny Side Up (1960)
- Midnight Sun (1960)
- Here 'Tis (1961)
- Gravy Train (1961)
- A Man with a Horn (1961)
- The Natural Soul (1962)
- Good Gracious! (1963)
- Signifyin' (1963)
- Possum Head (1964)
- Cole Slaw (1964)
- Rough House Blues (1964)
- Musty Rusty (1965)
- Blowing in the Wind (1966)
- Lou Donaldson at His Best (1966)
- Lush Life (1967)
- Alligator Bogaloo (1967)
- Mr. Shing-A-Ling (1967)
- Midnight Creeper (1968)
- Say It Loud! (1968)
- Hot Dog (1969)
- Everything I Play Is Funky (1970)
- Pretty Things (1970)
- Cosmos (1971)
- Sophisticated Lou (1972)
- Sassy Soul Strut (1973)
- Sweet Lou (1974)
- A Different Scene (1976)
- Color as a Way of Life (1976)
- Sweet Poppa Lou (1981)
- Forgotten Man (1981)
- Back Street (1982)
- Play the Right Thing (1990)
- Birdseed (1992)
- Caracas (1993)
- Sentimental Journey (1995)
