= Jimmy Smith discography =

This is a discography of American jazz organist Jimmy Smith (1928–2005).

== Discography ==
=== As leader/co-leader ===
==== Blue Note years (1956–1963; 1986, 1993) ====
Year released	Label	Catalogue	Title	Recording date	Notes
1956	Blue Note	BLP 1512	A New Sound... A New Star..., Vol. 1	1956-02-18	
1956	Blue Note	BLP 1514	A New Sound – A New Star, Vol. 2	1956-03-27	AKA The Champ
1956	Blue Note	BLP 1525	Jimmy Smith at the Organ	1956-06-17, -18	AKA The Incredible Jimmy Smith, Vol. 3
1956	Blue Note	BLP 1528	At Club Baby Grand, Volume 1	1956-08-04	Live
1956	Blue Note	BLP 1529	At Club Baby Grand, Volume 2	1956-08-04	Live
1957	Blue Note	BLP 1547	A Date with Jimmy Smith, Volume One	1957-02-11, -12, -13	
1957	Blue Note	BLP 1548	A Date with Jimmy Smith, Volume Two	1957-02-11, -12, -13	
1957	Blue Note	BLP 1551	Jimmy Smith at the Organ, Volume 1	1957-02-12, -13	
1957	Blue Note	BLP 1552	Jimmy Smith at the Organ, Volume 2	1957-02-12, -13	
1957	Blue Note	BLP 1556	The Sounds of Jimmy Smith	1957-02-11, -12, -13	
1957	Blue Note	BLP 1563	Plays Pretty Just for You	1957-05-08	
1958	Blue Note	BLP 1585	Groovin' at Smalls' Paradise, Volume 1	1957-11-15	Live
1958	Blue Note	BLP 1586	Groovin' at Smalls' Paradise, Volume 2	1957-11-15	Live
1958	Blue Note	BLP 4002	House Party	1957-08-25, 1958-02-25	
1959	Blue Note	BLP 4011	The Sermon!	1957-08-25, 1958-02-25	
1960	Blue Note	BLP 4030	Crazy! Baby	1960-01-04	
1961	Blue Note	BLP 4050	Home Cookin'	1958-07-15, 1959-05-24, 1959-06-16	
1961	Blue Note	BLP 4078	Midnight Special	1960-04-25	
1962	Blue Note	BLP 4100	Plays Fats Waller	1962-01-23	
1963	Blue Note	BLP 4117	Back at the Chicken Shack	1960-04-25	
1963	Blue Note	BLP 4141	Rockin' the Boat	1963-02-07	
1964	Blue Note	BLP 4164	Prayer Meetin'	1963-02-08	With Stanley Turrentine
1965	Blue Note	BLP 4200	Softly as a Summer Breeze	1958-02-26, 1958-10-14	
1966	Blue Note	BLP 4235	Bucket!	1963-02-01	
1967	Blue Note	BLP 4255	I'm Movin' On	1963-01-31	
1968	Blue Note	BST 4269	Open House	1960-03-22	
1968	Blue Note	BST 4296	Plain Talk	1960-03-22	
1979	Blue Note	LT 992	Confirmation	1957-08-25, 1958-02-25	
1980	Blue Note	LT 1054	Cool Blues	1958-04-07	Live
1981	Blue Note	LT 1092	On the Sunny Side	1957-08-25, 1958-07-15, 1959-06-16, 1960-04-25	
1984	Blue Note		Special Guests	1957-08-25, 1960-06-13, 1963-01-31	Japan only release
1985	Blue Note		Jimmy Smith Trio + LD	1957-07-04	Japan only release. With Lou Donaldson.
1986	Blue Note		Go for Whatcha Know	1986-01-02, -03	
1994	Blue Note		The Master	1993-12-24, -25	Live
1994	Blue Note		The Master II	1993-12-24, -25	Live
1996	Blue Note		Cherokee	1957-05-08, 1957-07-03	Japan only release
1996	Blue Note		Lonesome Road	1957-11-20	Japan only release
1998	Blue Note		Standards	1957-08-27, 1958-07-15, 1959-05-24	
1999	Blue Note		Six Views of the Blues	1958-07-16	
2007	Blue Note		Straight Life	1961-06-22	

==== Verve years (1962–1968; 1971–1973; 1995, 2000) ====
Year released	Label	Catalogue	Title	Recording date	Notes
1962	Verve	V-8474	Bashin': The Unpredictable Jimmy Smith	1962-03	
1963	Verve	V-8544	Hobo Flats	1963-03	
1963	Verve (JP)/Metro	SMV-1059	Live at the Village Gate	1963-05	Live
1963	Verve	V-8552	Any Number Can Win	1963-07	
1963	Verve	V-8553	Blue Bash!	1963-07	With Kenny Burrell
1964	Verve	V-8583	Who's Afraid of Virginia Woolf?	1964-01	
1964	Verve	V-8587	The Cat	1964-04	
1964	Verve	V-8604	Christmas '64	1964-04, 1964–09	
1965	Verve	V-8618	Monster	1965-01	
1965	Verve (FR)		La metamorphose des cloportes	1965-06	[7"] EP
1965	Verve	V-8628	Organ Grinder Swing	1965-06	With Kenny Burrell
1965	Verve (DE)/Metro	711 058	In Hamburg – Live! also released as Incredible! Jimmy Smith	1965-?	Live
1966	Verve	V-8641	Got My Mojo Workin'	1965-12	
1966	Verve	V-8652	Peter & the Wolf	1966-05	
1966	Verve	V-8666	Christmas Cookin'	1964-04, 1964–09	reissue of V-8604
1966	Verve	V-8663	Hoochie Coochie Man	1966-06	
1966	Verve	V-8678	Jimmy & Wes: The Dynamic Duo	1966-09	With Wes Montgomery
1967	Verve	V-8705	Respect	1967-06	
1968	Verve	V-8745	Stay Loose	1968-01	
1968	Verve	V-8750	Livin' It Up!	1968-05	
1968	Verve	V6-8766	Further Adventures of Jimmy and Wes	1966-09	With Wes Montgomery
1968	Verve	V6-8770	The Boss	1968-?	Live
1970	Verve	V6-8794	Groove Drops	1968-11	
1971	Verve	V6-8800	In a Plain Brown Wrapper	1971-07?	
1972	Verve	V6-8806	Root Down	1972-02	Live
1972	Verve	V6-8809	Bluesmith	1972-09	
1973	Verve	V6S-8832	Portuguese Soul	1973-02	
1995	Verve	314 527 631–2	Damn!	1995-01	
1996	Verve	314 527 632–2	Angel Eyes: Ballads & Slow Jams	1995-01	
2001	Verve/Blue Thumb	314 543 978–2	Dot Com Blues	2000-02, 2000–03, 2000–04, 2000–06	

==== Others ====
Year released	Label	Title	Recording date	Notes
1966	Metro	Live in Concert	1965-05	Live
1966	Pickwick	Swings Along with Stranger in Paradise	1966-?	
1970	MGM	I'm Gon' Git Myself Together	1970-02	
1970	MGM	The Other Side of Jimmy Smith	1970-08	
1972	Cobblestone/Atlantic	The Jimmy Smith Jam	1972-07	Live. Newport In New York '72 series Vol.5.
1974	MGM/Pride	Black Smith	1974-?	
1974	Mojo	Paid in Full	1974-?	
1974	Isradisc	Live In Israel	1974-10?	Live. Israel only release.
1975	Mojo	Jimmy Smith '75	1974-10, additional	partially live in Israel
1977	Mercury	Sit on It!	1976-12	
1977	Mercury	It's Necessary	1977-07	Live
1978	Mercury	Unfinished Business	1978-01	
1979	Polydor	Jimmy Smith Plays For The People	1978-12	South Africa only release
1980	Wersi	The Cat Strikes Again	1980-07	
1981	Mojo	Second Coming	1981-?	
1982	Elektra/Musician	Off the Top	1982-06	
1983	Elektra/Musician	Keep On Comin'	1983-09	Live
1989	Milestone	Prime Time	1989-08	
1991	Milestone	Fourmost with Stanley Turrentine, Kenny Burrell, Grady Tate	1990-11	Live at Fat Tuesday's, November 16–17, 1990
1993	Milestone	Sum Serious Blues	1993-01	
1996	Milestone	All the Way Live with Eddie Harris	1981-08	Live
2001	Milestone	Fourmost Return	1990-11	Live at Fat Tuesday's, November 16–17, 1990
2002	West Wind	Daybreak also released as The Cat Swings Again (Jazz Hour, 2003), Black Cat (Castle Pie, 2004)	1999-10, 2001–04	Partially live (1999–10)

=== Compilations ===
- The Best of Jimmy Smith (V-8721) (Verve, 1967)
- The Fantastic Jimmy Smith (Upfront, 1969) – early pre-Blue Note recordings
- The History of Jimmy Smith (2V6S-8814) (Verve, 1972) [2LP]
- The Best of Jimmy Smith – The Blue Note Years (Blue Note, 1988)
- Walk on the Wild Side – Best of the Verve Years (Verve, 1995) [2CD]
- The Definitive Jimmy Smith (Blue Note, 2002)
- Milestone Profiles (Milestone, 2006)
- The Definitive Collection (Verve/UMe, 2008)

=== As sideman ===
With King Curtis

- Get Ready (Atco, 1970)
- Everybody's Talkin (Atco, 1972)

With Joey DeFrancesco

- Incredible! (Concord Jazz, 2000)
- Legacy (Concord Jazz, 2005)

With Quincy Jones

- Smackwater Jack (A&M, 1971)
- The Original Jam Sessions 1969 with Bill Cosby (Concord Jazz, 2004) – rec. 1969

With others

- George Benson, George Benson (Verve, 1987)
- Jean-Michel Bernard, Cash (Naive, 2008)
- Dee Dee Bridgewater, Love and Peace: A Tribute to Horace Silver (Verve, 1995)
- Kenny Burrell, Ellington Is Forever (Fantasy, 1975)
- Cornell Dupree, Shadow Dancing (Versatile, 1978)
- Stu Gardner, The Italian Heist (Super Disco Edits, 2019)
- Jon Hendricks, Love (Muse, 1982)
- James Ingram, It's Your Night (Qwest/Warner Bros., 1983)
- Michael Jackson, Bad (Epic, 1987)
- Toshihiko Kankawa, Quarter Run (Paddlewheel, 1984)
- Robbie Krieger, Robbie Krieger & Friends (Blue Note, 1977)
- Yoshiaki Miyanoue, Touch of Love (Vap, 1981)
- Frank Sinatra, L.A. Is My Lady (Qwest/WB, 1984)
- Candi Staton, Stand Up and Be a Witness (Beracah, 1989)
- Stanley Turrentine, Straight Ahead (Blue Note, 1985)
- Lenny White, Venusian Summer (Nemperor, 1975)
- V.A., Newport in New York '72 (The Jam Sessions, Vol. 4) (Cobblestone, 1972)
- V.A., One Night with Blue Note, Volume 3 (Blue Note, 1985)
