= Straight Life (Jimmy Smith album) =

Studio album by Jimmy Smith
- Released: 2007
- Recorded: June 22, 1961
- Studio: Van Gelder Studio, Englewood Cliffs, NJ
- Genre: Jazz
- Length: 50:12
- Label: Blue Note BST 85192
- Producer: Alfred Lion

Jimmy Smith chronology
Back at the Chicken Shack (1960)	Straight Life (2007)	Plays Fats Waller (1962)

Straight Life is an album by American jazz organist Jimmy Smith featuring performances recorded in 1961 but not released on the Blue Note label until 2007.

== Reception ==
The AllMusic review by Al Campbell awarded the album 3½ stars stating

"Although not in the same league as Midnight Special or Prayer Meetin', it's great to hear this long lost hard bop session from the master of the Hammond B-3".

Professional ratings
Review scores
Source	Rating
AllMusic	3.5/5 stars

== Track listing ==
All compositions by Jimmy Smith except as indicated

1. "Straight Life" – 5:09
2. "Stuffy" (Coleman Hawkins) – 5:09
3. "Stardust" (Hoagy Carmichael, Mitchell Parish) – 6:03
4. "Sweet Sue, Just You" (Will Harris, V. Young) – 4:52
5. "Minor Fare" – 5:39
6. "Swanee" (Irving Caesar, George Gershwin) – 2:28
7. "Jimmy's Blues" – 5:43
8. "Yes Sir, That's My Baby" (Walter Donaldson, Gus Kahn) – 4:59
9. "Here's to My Lady" (Rube Bloom, Johnny Mercer) – 4:55
10. "Minor Fare" [alternate take] – 5:15

- Recorded at Rudy Van Gelder Studio in Englewood Cliffs, New Jersey on June 22, 1961

== Personnel ==
=== Musicians ===
- Jimmy Smith – organ
- Quentin Warren – guitar
- Donald Bailey – drums

=== Technical ===
- Alfred Lion – producer
- Rudy Van Gelder – engineer
- Francis Wolff – photography
