= A Date with Jimmy Smith =

- Volume One

Studio album by Jimmy Smith
- Released: 1957
- Recorded: February 11–13, 1957
- Studio: Manhattan Towers, NYC
- Genre: Jazz
- Length: 34:02
- Label: Blue Note; BLP 1547 (Vol. One); BLP 1548 (Vol. Two)
- Producer: Alfred Lion

Jimmy Smith chronology
| At Club Baby Grand (1956) | A Date with Jimmy Smith (1957) | Jimmy Smith at the Organ Volume One (1957) |

A Date with Jimmy Smith
- Volume Two

Singles from A Date with Jimmy Smith, Volume One
- 1. "How High the Moon" Released: 1957

A Date with Jimmy Smith, Vols. One and Two are a pair of separate but related albums by American jazz organist Jimmy Smith recorded between February 11–13, 1957 and released on Blue Note later that year.

== Reception ==
Professional ratings
Review scores
| Source | Rating |
|---|---|
| AllMusic (Vol. 1) | 3/5 stars |
| AllMusic (Vol. 2) | 3/5 stars |

AllMusic awarded each volume three-out-of-five stars.

== Track listing ==
=== A Date with Jimmy Smith, Volume One ===
Side 1
| No. | Title | Writer(s) | Date recorded | Length |
|---|---|---|---|---|
| 1. | "Falling in Love with Love" | Lorenz Hart; Richard Rodgers | February 11, 1957 | 12:09 |
| 2. | "How High the Moon" | Nancy Hamilton; Morgan Lewis | February 13, 1957 | 6:00 |

Side 2
| No. | Title | Writer(s) | Date recorded | Length |
|---|---|---|---|---|
| 1. | "Funk's Oats" | Jimmy Smith | February 11, 1957 | 15:53 |

=== A Date with Jimmy Smith, Volume Two ===
Side 1
| No. | Title | Writer(s) | Date recorded | Length |
|---|---|---|---|---|
| 1. | "I Let a Song Go Out of My Heart" | Duke Ellington; Irving Mills; Henry Nemo; John Redmond | February 11, 1957 | 16:59 |

Side 2
| No. | Title | Writer(s) | Date recorded | Length |
|---|---|---|---|---|
| 1. | "I'm Getting Sentimental over You" | George Bassman; Ned Washington | February 12, 1957 | 4:11 |
| 2. | "Groovy Date" | Hank Mobley | February 11, 1957 | 6:00 |

== Personnel ==
=== Musicians ===
==== February 11, 1957 ====
- Jimmy Smith – organ
- Donald Byrd – trumpet
- Lou Donaldson – alto saxophone
- Hank Mobley – tenor saxophone
- Eddie McFadden – guitar
- Art Blakey – drums

==== February 12, 1957 ====
- Jimmy Smith – organ
- Lou Donaldson – alto saxophone

==== February 13, 1957 ====
- Jimmy Smith – organ
- Eddie McFadden – guitar
- Donald Bailey – drums

=== Technical personnel ===
- Alfred Lion – producer
- Rudy Van Gelder – recording engineer
- Reid Miles – design
- Francis Wolff – photography
- Ira Gitler – liner notes
