= Jimmy Smith at the Organ (1957 albums) =

1957 studio albums by Jimmy Smith

- Volume 1

Studio album by Jimmy Smith
- Released: 1957
- Recorded: February 12–13, 1957
- Studio: Manhattan Towers, NYC
- Genre: Hard bop
- Label: Blue Note; BLP 1551 (Vol. 1); BLP 1552 (Vol. 2)
- Producer: Alfred Lion

Jimmy Smith chronology
A Date with Jimmy Smith (1957)	Jimmy Smith at the Organ (1957)	The Sounds of Jimmy Smith (1957)

Jimmy Smith at the Organ
- Volume 2

Jimmy Smith at the Organ, Vols. 1 & 2 are a pair of separate but related albums by American jazz organist Jimmy Smith, recorded over February 12–13, 1957 and released on Blue Note in 1957 and 1958 respectively.

== Reception ==
Professional ratings
Review scores
Source	Rating
AllMusic (Vol. 1)	3/5 stars
AllMusic (Vol. 2)	3/5 stars
Billboard (Vol. 1)	3/4 stars

Billboard magazine gave Volume 1 three-out-of-four stars, stating that "Smith reiterates his ability to make the organ a functional, jazz instrument", and praising Smith's, Donaldson's, and Burrell's solos.

AllMusic jazz critic Scott Yanow says, "There is a fair amount of variety on this jam session LP. ... The music will be enjoyed by bop fans even though nothing all that essential occurs." and "Excellent bop-oriented jam sessions."

The JazzTimes review states: "Smith's 10-minute face-off with Blakey on 'The Duel' reaches some outré peaks, while the great organist's duet with Donaldson on 'Summertime' is a marvel of melodic improvisation."

== Track listing ==
=== Jimmy Smith at the Organ, Volume 1 ===
Side 1
No.	Title	Writer(s)	Date recorded	Length
1.	"Summertime"	George Gershwin	February 12, 1957	4:34
2.	"There's a Small Hotel"	Richard Rodgers; Lorenz Hart	February 12, 1957	11:53

Side 2
No.	Title	Writer(s)	Date recorded	Length
1.	"All Day Long"	Kenny Burrell	February 12, 1957	10:30
2.	"Yardbird Suite"	Charlie Parker	February 12, 1957	8:56

=== Jimmy Smith at the Organ, Volume 2 ===
All tracks are written by Jimmy Smith, except as noted.

Side 1
No.	Title	Writer(s)	Date recorded	Length
1.	"Plum Nellie"		February 13, 1957	7:40
2.	"Billie's Bounce"	Charlie Parker	February 12, 1957	8:23

Side 2
No.	Title	Date recorded	Length
1.	"The Duel"	February 12, 1957	10:27
2.	"Buns a Plenty"	February 13, 1957	6:59

== Personnel ==
=== Musicians ===
==== February 12, 1957 ====
- Jimmy Smith – organ
- Lou Donaldson – alto saxophone (except "There's a Small Hotel", "The Duel")
- Kenny Burrell – guitar (except "Summertime", "The Duel")
- Art Blakey – drums (except "Summertime")

==== February 13, 1957 ====
- Jimmy Smith – organ
- Lou Donaldson – alto saxophone (except "Buns a Plenty")
- Eddie McFadden – guitar
- Donald Bailey – drums

=== Technical personnel ===
- Alfred Lion – producer
- Rudy Van Gelder – recording engineer
- Reid Miles – design
- Francis Wolff – photography
- Robert Levin – liner notes
