= Six Views of the Blues =

Studio album by Jimmy Smith
- Released: 1999
- Recorded: July 16, 1958
- Studio: Van Gelder Studio, Hackensack, NJ
- Genre: Jazz
- Length: 45:53
- Label: Blue Note
- Producer: Alfred Lion

Jimmy Smith chronology
Cool Blues (1958)	Six Views of the Blues (1999)	Home Cookin' (1958-59)

Singles from Six Views of the Blues
- 1. "The Swingin' Shepherd Blues" Released: 1958

Professional ratings
Review scores
Source	Rating
Allmusic	3/5 stars

Six Views of the Blues is an album by the American jazz organist Jimmy Smith. It features performances recorded in 1958, but it wasn't released on the Blue Note label until 1999. Originally, the single "The Swingin' Shepherd Blues" was released in 1958 as Blue Note 45–1711.

== Reception ==
The Allmusic review by Ken Dryden awarded the album 3 stars, stating:

"this is great music that needs to be explored. Smith is still the master when it comes to slow blues on his instrument".

== Track listing ==
All compositions by Jimmy Smith except as indicated

1. "St. Louis Blues" (W. C. Handy) – 8:38
2. "The Swingin' Shepherd Blues" (Moe Koffman) – 3:55
3. "Blues No. 1" – 6:25
4. "Blues No. 3" – 7:10
5. "Blues No. 4" – 10:45
6. "Blues No. 2" – 9:00

- Recorded at Rudy Van Gelder Studio in Hackensack, New Jersey, on July 16, 1958

== Personnel ==
=== Musicians ===
- Jimmy Smith – organ
- Cecil Payne – baritone saxophone
- Kenny Burrell – guitar
- Donald Bailey – drums (tracks 4–6)
- Art Blakey – drums (tracks 1–3)

=== Technical ===
- Alfred Lion – producer
- Rudy Van Gelder – engineer
- Francis Wolff – photography
