= Softly as a Summer Breeze =

Studio album by Jimmy Smith
- Released: 1965
- Recorded: February 26, 1958; October 14, 1958 (bonus tracks)
- Studio: Manhattan Towers, New York; Van Gelder Studio, Hackensack, NJ (bonus tracks)
- Genre: Jazz
- Length: 49:32
- Label: Blue Note
- Producer: Alfred Lion

Jimmy Smith chronology
The Sermon! (1957)	Softly as a Summer Breeze (1965)	Cool Blues (1958)

Softly as a Summer Breeze is an album by American jazz organist Jimmy Smith featuring performances recorded in 1958 but not released on the Blue Note label until 1965. The album was rereleased on CD with four bonus tracks recorded at a later session.

== Reception ==
The Allmusic review by Scott Yanow awarded the album 3 stars stating

"Softly As a Summer Breeze is one of Jimmy Smith's more obscure Blue Notes... Overall, this CD is not too essential, but it does fill in a few gaps."

Professional ratings
Review scores
Source	Rating
Allmusic	3/5 stars

== Track listing ==
1. "These Foolish Things" (Harry Link, Holt Marvell, Jack Strachey) – 5:27
2. "Hackensack" (Thelonious Monk) – 5:58
3. "It Could Happen to You" (Johnny Burke, Jimmy Van Heusen) – 6:16
4. "Sometimes I'm Happy" (Irving Caesar, Vincent Youmans) – 8:21
5. "Someone to Watch Over Me" (George Gershwin, Ira Gershwin) – 6:30
6. "One for Philly Joe" [aka "Home Cookin'"] (Jimmy Smith) – 4:46

=== Bonus tracks on 1998 CD reissue ===
7. "Willow Weep for Me" (Ann Ronell) – 3:24
8. "Ain't No Use" (Leroy Kirkland, Sidney Wyche) – 2:40
9. "Angel Eyes" (Earl Brent, Matt Dennis) – 3:25
10. "Ain't That Love" (Ray Charles) – 2:45

- Recorded at Manhattan Towers, New York, on February 26, 1958 (tracks 1–6) and at Rudy Van Gelder Studio in Hackensack, New Jersey, on October 14, 1958 (tracks 7–10).

== Personnel ==
=== Musicians ===
- Jimmy Smith – organ
- Kenny Burrell – guitar, (tracks 1–4)
- Eddie McFadden – guitar, (tracks 5 & 6)
- Ray Crawford – guitar, (tracks 7–10)
- Philly Joe Jones – drums, (tracks 1–4)
- Donald Bailey – drums, (tracks 5–10)
- Bill Henderson – vocals, (tracks 7–10)

=== Technical ===
- Alfred Lion – producer
- Rudy Van Gelder – engineer
- Reid Miles – design
- Jean-Pierre Leloir – photography
- Leonard Feather – liner notes
