= Open House (album) =

Studio album by Jimmy Smith
- Released: January 1968
- Recorded: March 22, 1960
- Studio: Van Gelder Studio, Englewood Cliffs, NJ
- Genre: Jazz
- Length: 38:03
- Label: Blue Note; BST 84269
- Producer: Alfred Lion

Jimmy Smith chronology
Crazy! Baby (1960)	Open House (1968)	Plain Talk (1960)

Open House is an album by American jazz organist Jimmy Smith featuring performances recorded in 1960, but not released on the Blue Note label until 1968. The album didn't appear on CD until being reissued in 1992, as a twofer which also included Plain Talk, compiling all the recordings from the session.

== Reception ==
The Allmusic review by Michael Erlewine awarded the album 4 stars calling it "a fast-paced studio jam session".

Professional ratings
Review scores
Source	Rating
Allmusic	4/5 stars

== Track listing ==
1. "Open House" (Jimmy Smith) – 16:15
2. "Old Folks" (Willard Robison, Dedette Lee Hill) – 4:49
3. "Sista Rebecca" (Smith) – 10:54
4. "Embraceable You" (Gershwin, Gershwin) – 6:05

== Personnel ==
=== Musicians ===
- Jimmy Smith – organ
- Quentin Warren – guitar
- Donald Bailey – drums

=== Additional musicians ===
- Blue Mitchell – trumpet (tracks 1, 3)
- Jackie McLean – alto saxophone (tracks 1, 3, 4; feature track 4)
- Ike Quebec – tenor saxophone (tracks 1, 2, 3; feature track 2)

=== Technical ===
- Alfred Lion – producer
- Rudy Van Gelder – engineer
- Reid Miles – design
- Francis Wolff – photography
- Leonard Feather – liner notes
