= Groovin' at Smalls' Paradise =

Live album by Jimmy Smith
- Released: 1958
- Recorded: November 15, 1957
- Venue: Small's Paradise; New York City
- Genre: Jazz
- Length: 76:04
- Label: Blue Note; BLP 1585 (Vol. 1); BLP 1586 (Vol. 2)
- Producer: Alfred Lion

Jimmy Smith chronology
Jimmy Smith Trio + LD (1957)	Groovin' at Smalls' Paradise (1958)	House Party (1957-58)

Singles from Groovin' at Smalls' Paradise
- 1. "After Hours, Part 1" Released: 1958; 2. "Just Friends" Released: 1958

Groovin' at Smalls' Paradise, Vols. 1 & 2 are a pair of separate but related live albums by American jazz organist Jimmy Smith, recorded at Smalls' Paradise in New York City on November 15, 1957 and released on Blue Note the following year. The album was rereleased as a double CD with four bonus tracks recorded at the same performance.

== Reception ==
Professional ratings
Review scores
Source	Rating
AllMusic	4.5/5 stars
The Penguin Guide to Jazz	4/4 stars

The Penguin Guide to Jazz awarded Groovin' at Smalls' Paradise four stars and selected the CD reissue as part of its suggested “core collection” of essential recordings.

The editors at AllMusic awarded the album 4½ stars.

== Track listing ==
=== Groovin' at Smalls' Paradise, Volume 1 ===
Side 1
No.	Title	Writer(s)	Length
1.	"After Hours"	Erskine Hawkins; Avery Parrish	10:58
2.	"My Funny Valentine"	Lorenz Hart; Richard Rodgers	11:03

Side 2
No.	Title	Writer(s)	Length
1.	"Slightly Monkish"	Jimmy Smith	6:59
2.	"Laura"	Johnny Mercer; David Raksin	10:28

=== Groovin' at Smalls' Paradise, Volume 2 ===
Side 1
No.	Title	Writer(s)	Length
1.	"Imagination"	Johnny Burke; Jimmy Van Heusen	7:56
2.	"Just Friends"	John Klenner; Sam M. Lewis	6:29
3.	"Lover Man"	Jimmy Davis; Ram Ramirez; James Sherman	7:28

Side 2
No.	Title	Writer(s)	Length
1.	"Body and Soul"	Edward Heyman; Robert Sour; Frank Eyton; Johnny Green	10:03
2.	"(Back Home Again in) Indiana"	James F. Hanley; Ballard MacDonald	15:40

=== CD reissue: Groovin' at Smalls' Paradise, Volumes 1&2 ===
Disc one
No.	Title	Writer(s)	Length
1.	"Imagination"	Johnny Burke; Jimmy Van Heusen	7:56
2.	"Walkin'"	Richard Carpenter	11:41
3.	"My Funny Valentine"	Lorenz Hart; Richard Rodgers	11:03
4.	"It's Only a Paper Moon"	Harold Arlen; E. Y. Harburg; Billy Rose	10:28
5.	"I Can't Give You Anything but Love"	Dorothy Fields; Jimmy McHugh	7:00
6.	"Laura"	Johnny Mercer; David Raksin	10:28

Disc two
No.	Title	Writer(s)	Length
1.	"(Back Home Again in) Indiana"	James F. Hanley; Ballard MacDonald	15:40
2.	"Body and Soul"	Edward Heyman; Robert Sour; Frank Eyton; Johnny Green	10:03
3.	"The Champ"	Dizzy Gillespie	13:47
4.	"Lover Man"	Jimmy Davis; Ram Ramirez; James Sherman	7:28
5.	"Slightly Monkish"	Jimmy Smith	6:59
6.	"After Hours"	Erskine Hawkins; Avery Parrish	10:58
7.	"Just Friends"	John Klenner; Sam M. Lewis	6:29

== Personnel ==
=== Musicians ===
- Jimmy Smith – organ
- Eddie McFadden – guitar
- Donald Bailey – drums

=== Technical personnel ===
- Alfred Lion – producer
- Rudy Van Gelder – engineer
- Reid Miles – cover design
- Francis Wolff – photography
- Leonard Feather – liner notes
