= I'm Movin' On (Jimmy Smith album) =

Studio album by Jimmy Smith
- Released: August 1967
- Recorded: January 31, 1963
- Studio: Van Gelder Studio, Englewood Cliffs, NJ
- Genre: Jazz
- Length: 36:58 original LP; 50:07CD reissue
- Label: Blue Note; BST 84255
- Producer: Alfred Lion

Jimmy Smith chronology
Bashin' (1963)	I'm Movin' On (1967)	Bucket! (1963)

I'm Movin' On is an album by American jazz organist Jimmy Smith featuring performances recorded in 1963, but not released on the Blue Note label until 1967. It was rereleased on CD with two bonus tracks from the same session.

== Reception ==
The Allmusic review by Scott Yanow awarded the album 3 stars stating:

"the music is fairly typical of a Jimmy Smith session with the repertoire including blues, a couple of standards and ballads. The solos are well-played but nothing too surprising occurs".

Professional ratings
Review scores
Source	Rating
Allmusic	3/5 stars
The Penguin Guide to Jazz	3/4 stars

== Track listing ==
1. "I'm Movin' On" (Hank Snow) – 5:17
2. "Hotel Happiness" (Earl Shuman, Leon Carr) – 2:56
3. "Cherry" (Ray Gilbert, Don Redman) – 3:58
4. "'Tain't No Use" (Burton Lane, Herbert Magidson) – 6:08
5. "Back Talk" (Jimmy Smith) – 11:06
6. "What Kind of Fool Am I?" (Leslie Bricusse, Anthony Newley) – 7:33

=== Bonus tracks on 1995 CD reissue ===
7. "Organic Greenery" (Smith) – 7:26
8. "Day In, Day Out" (Rube Bloom, Johnny Mercer) – 6:43

== Personnel ==
=== Musicians ===
- Jimmy Smith – organ
- Grant Green – guitar (tracks 1–5, 7–8)
- Donald Bailey – drums (tracks 1–5, 7–8)

=== Technical ===
- Alfred Lion – producer
- Rudy Van Gelder – engineer
- Reid Miles – cover design, photography
- Ira Gitler – liner notes
