= Plays Fats Waller =

Studio album by Jimmy Smith
- Released: 1962
- Recorded: January 23, 1962
- Studio: Van Gelder Studio; Englewood Cliffs, New Jersey
- Genre: Jazz
- Length: 34:55
- Label: Blue Note; BLP 4100
- Producer: Alfred Lion

Jimmy Smith chronology
Midnight Special (1961)	Plays Fats Waller (1962)	Bashin': The Unpredictable Jimmy Smith (1962)

Plays Fats Waller is an album by American jazz organist Jimmy Smith featuring performances of tunes associated with Fats Waller, recorded on January 23, 1962 and released on Blue Note later that year.

== Reception ==
The AllMusic review by Steve Leggett states, "It's fairly typical Smith, who careens, bolts, stutters, glides, and flashes notes all over the place at a frequently breathless pace, doing what he always does, which is being Jimmy Smith at the organ. That's what you want, and that's what you get here."

Professional ratings
Review scores
Source	Rating
AllMusic	4/5 stars

== Track listing ==
=== Side 1 ===
1. "Everybody Loves My Baby" (Jack Palmer, Spencer Williams) – 3:47
2. "Squeeze Me" (Fats Waller) – 5:31
3. "Ain't She Sweet" (Milton Ager, Jack Yellen) – 3:37
4. "Ain't Misbehavin'" (Harry Brooks, Andy Razaf, Waller) – 3:44

=== Side 2 ===
1. "Lulu's Back in Town" (Al Dubin, Harry Warren) – 5:16
2. 'Honeysuckle Rose" (Andy Razaf, Waller) – 6:57
3. "I've Found a New Baby" (Palmer, Williams) – 6:03

== Personnel ==
=== Musicians ===
- Jimmy Smith – organ
- Quentin Warren – guitar
- Donald Bailey – drums

=== Technical personnel ===
- Alfred Lion – producer
- Rudy Van Gelder – recording engineer
- Reid Miles – design
- Francis Wolff – photography
- Del Shields – liner notes
