= Rockin' the Boat =

Studio album by Jimmy Smith
- Released: 1963
- Recorded: February 7, 1963
- Studios: Van Gelder Studio, Englewood Cliffs, NJ
- Genre: Jazz
- Length: 38:29
- Label: Blue Note
- Producer: Alfred Lion

Jimmy Smith chronology
| Bucket! (1963) | Rockin' the Boat (1963) | Prayer Meetin' (1963) |

Singles from Rockin' the Boat
- 1. "Can Heat" Released: January 1964

Rockin' the Boat is an album by the American jazz organist Jimmy Smith, recorded in 1963 and released on the Blue Note label.

== Reception ==
Professional ratings
Review scores
| Source | Rating |
|---|---|
| AllMusic | 4/5 stars |
| DownBeat | 2.5/5 stars |
| The Penguin Guide to Jazz | 3/4 stars |

The AllMusic review by Scott Yanow stated:

"Organist Jimmy Smith's next-to-last LP for Blue Note after a very extensive seven-year period is up to his usual level... the quartet swings with soul".

== Track listing ==
1. "When My Dreamboat Comes Home" (Cliff Friend, Dave Franklin) – 7:29
2. "Pork Chop" (Lou Donaldson) – 7:39
3. "Matilda, Matilda!" (Harry Thomas) – 2:59
4. "Can Heat" (Jimmy Smith) – 5:24
5. "Please Send Me Someone to Love" (Percy Mayfield) – 6:14
6. "Just a Closer Walk With Thee" (Traditional) – 3:48
7. "Trust in Me" (Milton Ager, Jean Schwartz, Ned Wever) – 4:56

- Recorded at Van Gelder Studio in Englewood Cliffs, New Jersey on February 7, 1963

== Personnel ==
Musicians

- Jimmy Smith – organ
- Lou Donaldson – alto saxophone
- Quentin Warren – guitar
- Donald Bailey – drums
- "Big" John Patton – tambourine (tracks 2–3, 6)

Technical

- Alfred Lion – producer
- Rudy Van Gelder – engineer
- Reid Miles – design
- Francis Wolff – photography
- Leonard Feather – liner notes

== Chart performance ==
=== Album ===
| Chart (1963) | Peak position | Total weeks |
|---|---|---|
| U.S. Billboard 200 | 62 | 8 |
