= Plain Talk =

Plain Talk may refer to:

- Plain Talk (magazine), an American monthly anti-communist magazine
- Plain Talk (album), an album by Jimmy Smith
- PlainTalk, the collective name for several speech synthesis and speech recognition technologies developed by Apple Inc.
