= Plays Pretty Just for You =

Studio album by Jimmy Smith at the Organ
- Released: 1957
- Recorded: May 8, 1957
- Studio: Manhattan Towers, NYC
- Genre: Jazz
- Length: 41:39
- Label: Blue Note; BLP 1563
- Producer: Alfred Lion

Jimmy Smith chronology
| The Sounds of Jimmy Smith (1957) | Plays Pretty Just for You (1957) | Jimmy Smith Trio + LD (1957) |

Singles from Plays Pretty Just for You
- 1. "East of the Sun" Released: 1957

Plays Pretty Just for You is an album by American jazz organist Jimmy Smith recorded on May 8, 1957 and released on Blue Note later that year.

== Reception ==
The AllMusic review awarded the album 3 stars.

Professional ratings
Review scores
| Source | Rating |
|---|---|
| AllMusic | 3/5 stars |

== Track listing ==
=== Side 1 ===
1. "The Nearness of You" (Hoagy Carmichael, Ned Washington) – 5:44
2. "The Jitterbug Waltz" (Fats Waller) – 4:57
3. "East of the Sun" (Brooks Bowman) – 6:06
4. "Autumn in New York" (Vernon Duke) – 4:24

=== Side 2 ===
1. "Penthouse Serenade (When We're Alone)" (Val Burton, Will Jason) – 5:29
2. "The Very Thought of You" (Ray Noble) – 4:29
3. "I Can't Get Started" (Duke, Ira Gershwin) – 4:48
4. "Old Devil Moon" (E. Y. Harburg, Burton Lane) – 5:42

== Personnel ==
=== Musicians ===
- Jimmy Smith – organ
- Eddie McFadden – guitar
- Donald Bailey – drums

=== Technical personnel ===
- Alfred Lion – producer
- Rudy Van Gelder – recording engineer
- Tom Hannan – design
- Francis Wolff – photography
- Leonard Feather – liner notes
