= Walk on the Wild Side (David and Bernstein song) =

Single by Brook Benton

from the album Golden Hits Volume 2
- B-side: "Somewhere in the Used to Be"
- Released: February 11, 1962
- Recorded: 1962
- Length: 2:30
- Label: Mercury
- Composer: Elmer Bernstein
- Lyricist: Mack David

Brook Benton singles chronology
"The Lost Penny" (1962)	"Walk on the Wild Side" (1962)	"Hit Record" (1962)

Official audio
- "Walk on the Wild Side" on YouTube

"Walk on the Wild Side" originated as the title song of the 1962 film of the same name as performed by Brook Benton over the film's coda and closing credits. Lyrics were written by Mack David and music was by Elmer Bernstein. The two earned an Oscar nomination for Best Original Song.

== Background ==
The song evokes the jazz and gospel music musical styles of the film's New Orleans setting, and the reputation of its Storyville district. It addresses an unnamed straying Christian — or perhaps all who

…walk on the wild side
Away from the promised land

and seems to threaten them in terms understood within their life style:

One day of praying, and six nights of fun.
Odds against getting to Heaven: six to one.

The song has had a second life in real-life gospel music.

== Chart performance ==
=== Brook Benton ===
Chart (1962)	Peak position
Canada CHUM Chart	33
US Billboard Hot 100	43

== Jimmy Smith version ==
Jazz organist Jimmy Smith recorded an instrumental version of the song for his 1962 album Bashin': The Unpredictable Jimmy Smith. The music was arranged by Oliver Nelson and features Nelson's Big Band. The record cover displays a sticker-facsimile quoting "Includes the exciting jazz version of WALK ON THE WILD SIDE" in order to take advantage of the success of the movie soundtrack.

The track was released spread over two sides of a 45-rpm single; Smith's organ is not heard until Part Two. The single reached No. 21 on the Billboard Hot 100 chart in June 1962. On the Hot R&B Sides chart, the track peaked at No. 4

== Other recordings ==
- Harry James recorded a version in 1965 on his album Harry James Plays Green Onions & Other Great Hits (Dot DLP 3634 and DLP 25634).
- The Persuasions covered the song in 1971 on their second album We Came To Play (Capitol Records).
