= House Party (Jimmy Smith album) =

Studio album by Jimmy Smith
- Released: 1958
- Recorded: August 25, 1957; February 25, 1958
- Studio: Manhattan Towers, NYC
- Genre: Jazz
- Length: 42:46 (LP); 53:20 (CD)
- Label: Blue Note; BLP 4002
- Producer: Alfred Lion

Jimmy Smith chronology
Groovin' at Small's Paradise (1957)	House Party (1958)	The Sermon! (1958)

House Party is the tenth studio album by American jazz organist Jimmy Smith, recorded on August 25, 1957 and February 25, 1958 and released on Blue Note in 1958—his fourteenth release for the label.

== Background ==
Blue Note used the Manhattan Towers Hotel Ballroom in New York City for recording sessions in 1957–1958, while their recording engineer Rudy Van Gelder was still using his parents' Hackensack, N.J. home studio to record artists. House Party was the first of two Smith albums recorded on two dates, the second was Smith's next album The Sermon!, released in 1959. Blue Note mainly used the Manhattan Towers ballroom for larger groups of musicians, or when New York was a more convenient location to record the artists involved.

== Reception ==
The AllMusic review by Lindsay Planer states, "the real pleasure lies in the experience of hearing it".

Professional ratings
Review scores
Source	Rating
Allmusic	4/5 stars

== Track listing ==
Side 1
No.	Title	Writer(s)	Date recorded	Length
1.	"Au Privave"	Charlie Parker	February 25, 1958	15:09
2.	"Lover Man"	Jimmy Davis; Ram Ramirez; James Sherman	February 25, 1958	7:00

Side 2
No.	Title	Writer(s)	Date recorded	Length
1.	"Just Friends"	John Klenner; Sam M. Lewis	August 25, 1957	15:15
2.	"Blues After All"	Kenny Burrell	August 25, 1957	6:06

1987 CD reissue bonus track
No.	Title	Writer(s)	Date recorded	Length
5.	"Confirmation"	Parker	February 25, 1958	10:34

== Personnel ==
=== Musicians ===
==== August 25, 1957 ====
- Jimmy Smith – organ
- Lee Morgan – trumpet
- Curtis Fuller – trombone
- George Coleman – alto saxophone
- Eddie McFadden – guitar ("Just Friends")
- Donald Bailey – drums

==== February 25, 1958 ====
- Jimmy Smith – organ
- Lee Morgan – trumpet (except "Lover Man")
- Lou Donaldson – alto saxophone
- Tina Brooks – tenor saxophone (except "Lover Man")
- Kenny Burrell (except "Lover Man"), Eddie McFadden ("Lover Man") – guitar
- Art Blakey (except "Lover Man"), Donald Bailey ("Lover Man") – drums

=== Technical personnel ===
- Alfred Lion – producer
- Rudy Van Gelder – recording engineer
- Reid Miles – design
- Francis Wolff – photography
- Robert Levin – liner notes
