= Eddie McFadden =

American jazz guitarist (1928–1992)

Background information
- Born: August 6, 1928
- Died: September 23, 1992 (aged 64)
- Genres: Jazz
- Occupation(s): Musician, composer
- Instrument: Guitar
- Years active: 1950s–1992

Eddie Lee McFadden (August 6, 1928 – September 23, 1992) was a jazz guitarist. He played in Philadelphia clubs from the 1950s and was in organist Jimmy Smith's band for several recordings in 1957–58. He then recorded several albums with another organist – Johnny "Hammond" Smith – during the period 1960–63, and one more in 1966. McFadden made two further sideman appearances on albums in the late 1970s.

== Early life ==
McFadden was born on August 6, 1928. His mother was Mary McFadden. As a small child, he tried the piano, but later settled on guitar. He had military service, after which he concentrated on jazz guitar.

== Career ==
McFadden played in music clubs in Philadelphia from the 1950s. He recorded with organist Jimmy Smith as part of a trio and sextet in February 1957, resulting in the albums A Date with Jimmy Smith Volume One and A Date with Jimmy Smith Volume Two. Several more albums resulted from their collaborations, lasting into 1958. McFadden continued performing with Smith in a trio with drummer Donald Bailey, including at the Hurricane club in Pittsburgh for several weeks during 1958.

McFadden recorded with Johnny "Hammond" Smith on the organist's Gettin' the Message in 1960. McFadden appeared on several more albums under Smith's name up to Open House! in 1963. A further album – The Stinger Meets the Golden Thrush – from 1966 appears to have been the last time that the guitarist recorded with Smith.

In November 1967, the "Al Grey & Eddie McFadden Quartet" was advertised as playing at Count Basie's Lounge in New York. In 1977, McFadden recorded again, for Sonny Phillips' I Concentrate on You. McFadden recorded with another organist – Don Patterson – in the following year, resulting in the album Why Not....

McFadden also wrote music for some of his bands. In September 1992, McFadden played at the White Horse Lounge on Lancaster Avenue in Philadelphia. He died on September 23 that year.

== Discography ==
=== As sideman ===
With Don Patterson

- Why Not... (1978)

With Sonny Phillips

- I Concentrate on You (1977)

With Jimmy Smith

- A Date with Jimmy Smith Volume One (1957)
- A Date with Jimmy Smith Volume Two (1957)
- Jimmy Smith at the Organ, Vol. 2 (1957)
- The Sounds of Jimmy Smith (1957)
- Plays Pretty Just for You (1957)
- Jimmy Smith Trio + LD (1957)
- Groovin at Smalls' Paradise, Vol. 1 (1957)
- Groovin at Smalls' Paradise, Vol. 2 (1957)
- The Sermon! (1957)
- House Party (1957–58)
- Softly as a Summer Breeze (1958)
- Cool Blues (1958)

With Johnny "Hammond" Smith

- Gettin' the Message (1960)
- Stimulation (1961)
- Opus De Funk (1961)
- Johnny "Hammond" Cooks with Gator Tail (1962)
- Black Coffee (1962)
- Mr. Wonderful (1963)
- Open House! (1963)
- The Stinger Meets the Golden Thrush (1966)
