= Christmas '64 =

Studio album by Jimmy Smith
- Released: 1964
- Recorded: April 20 & September 29, 1964
- Studio: Van Gelder Studio, Englewwod Cliffs, NJ
- Genre: Jazz, Christmas
- Length: 48:51
- Label: Verve
- Producer: Creed Taylor

Jimmy Smith chronology
Who's Afraid of Virginia Woolf? (1964)	Christmas '64 (1964)	Monster (1965)

Alternative cover / title
- 1966 LP re-issue as Christmas Cookin'

Christmas '64 is a 1964 studio album by the American jazz organist Jimmy Smith. Smith's only album of Christmas music, it was reissued as Christmas Cookin' in 1966.

== Reception ==
Professional ratings
Review scores
Source	Rating
Allmusic	3/5 stars

A review on AllMusic said that "Compared to most Christmas albums, this is plenty groovy, with lots of Smith's trademark dexterity and bop runs on offer." An AllMusic review of the reissued Christmas Cookin', by Scott Yanow said that "...even if nothing all that unusual occurs, the performances can serve as high-quality background music during the Christmas season".

== Track listing ==
1. "God Rest Ye Merry Gentlemen" (Traditional) – 4:19
2. "Jingle Bells" (James Pierpont) – 3:15
3. "We Three Kings of Orient Are" (John Henry Hopkins Jr.) – 3:45
4. "The Christmas Song" (Mel Tormé, Bob Wells) – 4:32
5. "White Christmas" (Irving Berlin) – 2:51
6. "Santa Claus Is Coming to Town" (J. Fred Coots, Haven Gillespie) – 5:26
7. "Silent Night" (Franz Gruber, Josef Mohr) – 4:04
8. "God Rest Ye Merry Gentlemen" – 6:11

Bonus tracks on Christmas Cookin' 1992 CD reissue

9. "Baby, It's Cold Outside" (Frank Loesser) – 6:00
  - from Jimmy & Wes: The Dynamic Duo
10. "Greensleeves" (Traditional) – 8:53
  - from Organ Grinder Swing

== Personnel ==
=== Musicians ===
- Jimmy Smith – organ, (all tracks), arranger, (tracks 2, 6, 8)
- Kenny Burrell – guitar, (tracks 1, 3–5, 7, 10)
- Quentin Warren – guitar, (tracks 2, 6, 8)
- Art Davis – double bass, (tracks 1, 3–5, 7)
- Grady Tate – drums, (tracks 1, 3–5, 7)
- Billy Hart – drums, (tracks 2, 6, 8)
- Margaret Ross – harp, (tracks 1, 3–5, 7)
- Joe Newman – flugelhorn, (tracks 1, 3–5, 7)
- Paul Faulise, Tommy Mitchell – bass trombone, (tracks 1, 3–5, 7)
- Chauncey Welsch, Jimmy Cleveland – trombone, (tracks 1, 3–5, 7)
- Ernie Royal, Danny Stiles, Joe Wilder, Bernie Glow – trumpet, (tracks 1, 3–5, 7)
- Jim Buffington, Earl Chapin, Donald Corrado, Morris Secon – french horn, (tracks 1, 3–5, 7)
- Harvey Phillips – tuba, (tracks 1, 3–5, 7)
- George Devens – percussion, (tracks 1, 3–5, 7)
- Billy Byers – arranger, conductor, (tracks 1, 4–5, 7)
- Al Cohn – arranger, (track 3)

=== Technical ===
- Creed Taylor – producer
- Rudy Van Gelder – engineer
- Val Valentin – director of engineering
- Bob Irwin – mastering
- Hollis King – art direction
- Sherniece Smith – art producer
- Acy Lehman – cover design
- Howell Conent – photography
