= Back at the Chicken Shack =

Studio album by Jimmy Smith
- Released: February 12, 1963
- Recorded: April 25, 1960
- Studio: Van Gelder Studios, Englewood Cliffs, New Jersey
- Genre: Soul jazz; hard bop
- Length: 43:35 (CD), 37:50 (LP)
- Label: Blue Note
- Producer: Alfred Lion

Jimmy Smith chronology
Midnight Special (1961)	Back at the Chicken Shack (1963)	Straight Life (1961)

Professional ratings
Review scores
Source	Rating
Allmusic	5/5 stars
Down Beat (Original LP release)	3/5 stars
The Penguin Guide to Jazz	3/4 stars

Back at the Chicken Shack is an album by Jimmy Smith. It was recorded in 1960 and released in 1963 on the Blue Note label. Smith recorded the album in the same session as his previous album Midnight Special. It was cited in the book 1001 Albums You Must Hear Before You Die.

== Track listing ==
Side 1
No.	Title	Writer(s)	Length
1.	"Back at the Chicken Shack"	Jimmy Smith	8:01
2.	"When I Grow Too Old to Dream"	Oscar Hammerstein II, Sigmund Romberg	9:54

Side 2
No.	Title	Writer(s)	Length
3.	"Minor Chant"	Stanley Turrentine	7:30
4.	"Messy Bessie"	Smith	12:25
Total length:			37:50

1987 CD Reissue (US & Europe)
No.	Title	Writer(s)	Length
5.	"On the Sunny Side of the Street"	Dorothy Fields, Jimmy McHugh	5:45
Total length:			43:35

== Personnel ==
- Jimmy Smith – organ
- Stanley Turrentine – tenor saxophone
- Kenny Burrell – guitar (1,4,5)
- Donald Bailey – drums

== Production ==
- Alfred Lion – producer
- Rudy Van Gelder – engineer
- Reid Miles – design
- Francis Wolff – photography
- Ira Gitler – liner notes
