= Jimmy Smith at the Organ =

Jimmy Smith at the Organ may refer to:

- Jimmy Smith at the Organ (1956 album)
- Jimmy Smith at the Organ (1957 albums)
