= Bucket! =

Studio album by Jimmy Smith
- Released: 1966
- Recorded: February 1, 1963
- Studio: Van Gelder Studio, Englewood Cliffs, NJ
- Genre: Jazz
- Length: 45:08
- Label: Blue Note
- Producer: Alfred Lion

Jimmy Smith chronology
I'm Movin' On (1963)	Bucket! (1966)	Rockin' the Boat (1963)

Bucket! is an album by American jazz organist Jimmy Smith featuring performances recorded in 1963 but not released on the Blue Note label until 1966. The CD reissue added two tracks recorded at the same session as bonus tracks.

== Reception ==
The Allmusic review by Stephen Thomas Erlewine awarded the album 3 calling it:

"a pretty good record, one that hardcore fans will find satisfying after they've exhausted the greater Smith sessions, but not one that will captivate the attentions of anyone who isn't a dyed-in-the-wool Jimmy Smith aficionado".

Professional ratings
Review scores
Source	Rating
Allmusic	3/5 stars

== Track listing ==
All compositions by Jimmy Smith except as indicated

1. "Bucket" – 4:43
2. "Careless Love" (W.C. Handy, Martha E. Koenig, Spencer Williams) – 3:53
3. "3 for 4" – 4:49
4. "Just Squeeze Me (But Please Don't Tease Me)" (Duke Ellington, Lee Gaines) – 5:44
5. "Sassy Mae" – 4:20
6. "Come Rain or Come Shine" (Harold Arlen, Johnny Mercer) – 5:47
7. "John Brown's Body" (Traditional) – 6:21

=== Bonus tracks on 2000 CD reissue ===
8. "Trouble in Mind" (Richard M. Jones) – 5:39
9. "Sassy Mae" [alternate take] – 3:52
- Recorded at Rudy Van Gelder Studio in Englewood Cliffs, New Jersey on February 1, 1963

== Personnel ==
=== Musicians ===
- Jimmy Smith – organ
- Quentin Warren – guitar
- Donald Bailey – drums

=== Technical ===
- Alfred Lion – producer
- Rudy Van Gelder – engineer
- Reid Miles – cover design
- Jean-Pierre Leloir – photography
- Leonard Feather – liner notes
