= Hobo Flats =

Studio album by Jimmy Smith
- Released: 1963
- Recorded: March 15 & 20, 1963; New York City
- Genre: Jazz
- Length: 31:26 CD reissue
- Label: Verve; V6-8544
- Producer: Creed Taylor

Jimmy Smith chronology
Prayer Meetin' (1963)	Hobo Flats (1963)	Any Number Can Win (1963)

Singles from Hobo Flats
- 1. "Hobo Flats" Released: March 1963

Hobo Flats is an album by American jazz organist Jimmy Smith arranged by Oliver Nelson. It was Smith's second album for Verve Records.

On the Billboard 200 Hobo Flats peaked at number 11, and the title track was released as a single and peaked at number 69.

Billboard magazine included Hobo Flats in its 'Pop Spotlight' for the week of 27 April 1963.

== Reception ==
Professional ratings
Review scores
Source	Rating
Allmusic	3.5/5 stars

The Allmusic review by Steve Leggett awarded the album 3½ stars stating that

"Smith bubbles and bounces through all of it at the B-3 while Nelson proceeds to fill every available corner with huge, sweeping orchestral washes and crescendos. The clear highlight, though, is the lead and title track, "Hobo Flats," which moves at a languid but wonderfully funky pace and establishes a groove as wide as the Mississippi River. Smith arguably was at his best in small combos, and at times he gets overwhelmed here by the big cinematic arrangements, but there's plenty to like with this set, even if it's a bit on the atypical side for Smith. It works well more than it doesn't."

== Track listing ==
1. "Hobo Flats" (Oliver Nelson) – 4:46
2. "Blueberry Hill" (Al Lewis, Vincent Rose, Larry Stock) – 4:56
3. "Walk Right In" (Gus Cannon, Erik Darling, Hosea Woods) – 3:32
4. "Trouble in Mind" (Richard M. Jones) – 4:23
5. "The Preacher" (Horace Silver) – 6:16
6. "Meditation (Meditação)" (Norman Gimbel, Antonio Carlos Jobim, Newton Mendonça) – 3:06
7. "I Can't Stop Loving You" (Don Gibson) – 4:27

== Personnel ==
Musicians

- Jimmy Smith – organ
- George Dorsey, Phil Woods – alto saxophone
- Al Cohn, Zoot Sims – tenor saxophone
- Jimmy Cleveland, Urbie Green, Quentin Jackson – trombone
- Joe Newman, Ernie Royal, Clark Terry – trumpet
- George Duvivier, Milt Hinton – double bass
- Jimmy Johnson Jr., John "Dandy" Rodriguez, Bill Rodriquez – drums
- Buddy Lucas – harmonica (Track 1 only)

Production

- Creed Taylor – producer
- Oliver Nelson – arranger, conductor
- Val Valentin – director of engineering
- Bob Simpson – engineer
- Kevin Reeves – digital remastering
- Hollis King – art direction
- Isabelle Wong – package design
- Chuck Stewart – photography
- Del Shields – liner notes
- Andy Kman – production coordination
- Ray Hall – re-recording engineer
- Harry Weinger – reissue supervisor

== Chart performance ==
=== Album ===
Chart (1963)	Peak position	Total weeks
U.S. Billboard 200	18	17

=== Single ===
Year	Single	Chart	Position
1963	"Hobo Flats"	Billboard Hot 100	18
