= Home Cookin' (album) =

Studio album by Jimmy Smith
- Released: April 1961
- Recorded: July 15, 1958, May 24 & June 16, 1959
- Studio: Van Gelder Studio, Hackensack, New Jersey
- Genre: Jazz blues
- Length: 39:37 original LP; 70:10 CD reissue
- Label: Blue Note; BST 84050
- Producer: Alfred Lion

Jimmy Smith chronology
Crazy! Baby (1960)	Home Cookin' (1961)	Midnight Special (1961)

Singles from Home Cookin
- 1. "See See Rider" Released: April 1960

Home Cookin' is an album by the American jazz organist Jimmy Smith of performances recorded in 1958 and 1959 and released on the Blue Note label. The album was rereleased on CD with five bonus tracks.

== Reception ==
Professional ratings
Review scores
Source	Rating
AllMusic	4/5 stars
The Penguin Guide to Jazz	3/4 stars

The AllMusic review by Lindsay Planer states: "The Hammond organ mastery of Jimmy Smith is arguably nowhere as profound as on this collection... Jimmy Smith's voluminous catalog is remarkably solid throughout and Home Cookin' is a recommended starting place for burgeoning enthusiasts as well as a substantial entry for the initiated". The Penguin Guide to Jazz placed this album by Smith among those it regarded as "formulaic"; but highlighted the presence of Burrell and concluded that it was "A solid one".

== Track listing ==
All compositions by Jimmy Smith, except as indicated

1. "See See Rider" (Ma Rainey) – 6:35
2. "Sugar Hill" (Kenny Burrell) – 5:19
3. "I Got a Woman" (Ray Charles, Renald Richard) – 3:55
4. "Messin' Around" – 5:55
5. "Gracie" – 5:54
6. "Come on Baby" (Burrell) – 6:50
7. "Motorin' Along" (Jimmy McGriff) – 5:09

Bonus tracks on CD reissue:

8. "Since I Fell for You" (Buddy Johnson) – 4:19
9. "Apostrophe" (Percy France) – 6:35
10. "Groanin'" (Jack McDuff) – 8:10
11. "Motorin' Along" [alternate take] (McGriff) – 5:02
12. "Since I Fell for You" [alternate take] (Johnson) – 6:27

Recorded on July 15, 1958 (tracks 7, 8, 11, 12), May 24, 1959 (tracks 3, 10) and June 16, 1959 (tracks 1, 2, 4–6 & 9).

== Personnel ==
=== Musicians ===
- Jimmy Smith – organ
- Percy France – tenor saxophone (tracks 1, 4–6 & 9)
- Kenny Burrell – guitar
- Donald Bailey – drums

=== Technical ===
- Alfred Lion – producer
- Rudy Van Gelder – engineer
- Reid Miles – design
- Francis Wolff – photography
- Ira Gitler – liner notes
