= Groove Drops =

Studio album by Jimmy Smith
- Released: 1970
- Recorded: November 20, 1968
- Genre: Jazz-funk, jazz fusion
- Length: 30:55
- Label: Verve V6-8794
- Producer: Johnny Pate

Jimmy Smith chronology
The Boss (1969)	Groove Drops (1970)	The Other Side of Jimmy Smith (1970)

Singles from Groove Drops
- 1. "Groove Drops" Released: Mat 1970

Groove Drops is a 1970 jazz album by Jimmy Smith, arranged, conducted and produced by Johnny Pate and released on the Verve label.

On the Billboard albums chart, Groove Drops peaked at number 197, and at 13 on the top Jazz albums chart.

== Reception ==
Professional ratings
Review scores
Source	Rating
Allmusic	2.5/5 stars

Allmusic awarded the album two and a half stars, with reviewer Ron Wynn writing that the album had a:

"Good title cut, nice solos throughout."

== Track listing ==
1. "Groove Drops" (Jimmy Smith) – 4:15
2. "Days of Wine and Roses" (Henry Mancini, Johnny Mercer) – 5:50
3. "Sunny" (Bobby Hebb) – 6:00
4. "Ode to Billie Joe" (Bobbie Gentry) – 6:25
5. "Who Can I Turn To (When Nobody Needs Me)" (Leslie Bricusse, Anthony Newley) – 3:40
6. "By the Time I Get to Phoenix" (Jimmy Webb) – 4:45

== Personnel ==
- Jimmy Smith – electronic organ
- Johnny Pate – arranger, conductor, producer
- George Piros – engineer
- Val Valentin – director of engineering

== Chart performance ==
=== Album ===
Chart (1970)	Peak position	Total weeks
U.S. Billboard 200	197	3
