= Any Number Can Win =

Any Number Can Win may refer to:

- Any Number Can Win (film), a 1962 French crime film
- Any Number Can Win (album), a 1963 album by the American jazz musician Jimmy Smith featuring the title track from the above film
