= The Other Side of Jimmy Smith =

Studio album by Jimmy Smith
- Released: 1970
- Recorded: August 10, 1970
- Studio: TTG (Hollywood); Bell Sound (New York City)
- Genre: Jazz
- Length: 36:36
- Label: MGM Records
- Producer: Johnny Pate

Jimmy Smith chronology
Groove Drops (1970)	The Other Side of Jimmy Smith (1970)	I'm Gonna Git Myself Together (1971)

Professional ratings
Review scores
Source	Rating
Allmusic	3/5 stars

The Other Side of Jimmy Smith is a 1970 album by jazz musician Jimmy Smith that was released by MGM in UK and Verve Records in France.

== Track listing ==
=== Side one ===
1. "My Romance" (Richard Rodgers, Lorenz Hart) – 3:29
2. "Why Don't You Try?" (Johnny Pate) – 4:33
3. "Bewitched" (Rodgers, Hart) – 3:40
4. "You Don't Know What Love Is" (Don Raye, Gene de Paul) – 4:11
5. "Yesterday" (John Lennon, Paul McCartney) – 3:05

=== Side two ===
1. "Nobody Knows" (Michel Legrand, Alan and Marilyn Bergman) – 3:50
2. "Bridge Over Troubled Water" (Paul Simon) – 5:05
3. "Close To You" (Burt Bacharach, Hal David) – 2:30
4. "What Are You Doing the Rest of Your Life?" (Legrand, Bergman, Bergman) – 4:26
5. "My Way" (Claude François, Jacques Revaux, Paul Anka) – 3:07

== Personnel ==
Musicians

- Jimmy Smith – organ
- Ron Carter – bass
- Joe Beck – guitar
- Jerome Richardson – flute
- Gene Orloff – violin

Production

- Johnny Pate – producer, arranger, conductor
- Rich Jacobs – engineer, (TTG Sound Studios)
- Tory Brainard – engineer, (Bell Sound Studios)
