= When Johnny Comes Marching Home =

American Civil War-era popular song

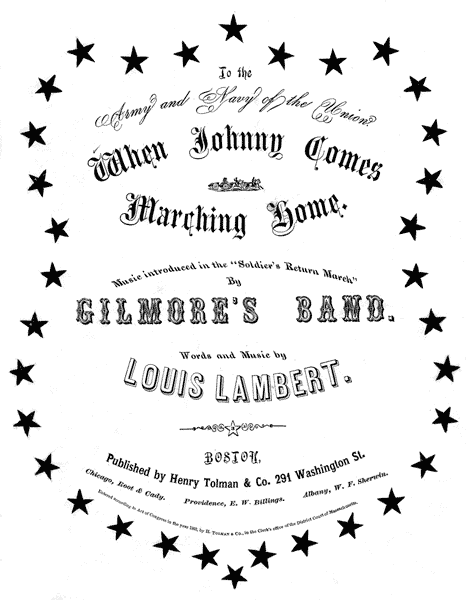
- Sheet music cover, 1863

Song
- Published: 1863; 163 years ago
- Songwriter: Louis Lambert a.k.a. Patrick Gilmore

Audio sample
- c. 1990 U.S. Military Academy Band performance: file; help

"When Johnny Comes Marching Home" (Roud 6673), sometimes "When Johnny Comes Marching Home Again", is a song from the American Civil War that expressed people's longing for the return of their friends and relatives who were fighting in the war.

== Origins ==
Irish-American bandleader Patrick Gilmore wrote the lyrics to "When Johnny Comes Marching Home" during the American Civil War. Its first publication was deposited in the Library of Congress on September 26, 1863, with words and music credited to "Louis Lambert"; copyright was retained by the publisher, Henry Tolman & Co., of Boston. Why Gilmore published under a pseudonym is unclear, but popular songwriters of the period often employed pseudonyms to add a touch of romantic mystery to their songs. Gilmore is said to have written the song for his sister Annie as she prayed for the safe return of her fiancé, Union Light Artillery Captain John O'Rourke, from the Civil War, although it is not clear if they were already engaged in 1863; the two were not married until 1875.

Gilmore later acknowledged that the music was not original but was, as he put it in an 1883 article in the Musical Herald, "a musical waif which I happened to hear somebody humming in the early days of the rebellion, and taking a fancy to it, wrote it down, dressed it up, gave it a name, and rhymed it into usefulness for a special purpose suited to the times."

The melody was previously published around July 1, 1863, as the music to the Civil War drinking song "Johnny Fill Up the Bowl". A color-illustrated, undated slip of Gilmore's lyrics, printed by his own Boston publisher, actually states that "When Johnny Comes Marching Home" should be sung to the tune of "Johnny Fill Up the Bowl". The original sheet music for "Johnny Fill Up the Bowl" states that the music was arranged (not composed) by J. Durnal. There is a melodic resemblance of the tune to that of "John Anderson, My Jo" (to which Robert Burns wrote lyrics to fit a pre-existing tune dating from about 1630 or earlier), and Jonathan Lighter has suggested a connection to the 17th-century ballad "The Three Ravens".

"When Johnny Comes Marching Home" is also sung to the same tune as "Johnny I Hardly Knew Ye" and is frequently thought to have been a rewriting of that song. "Johnny I Hardly Knew Ye" was not published until 1867, however, and it originally had a different melody.

"When Johnny Comes Marching Home" was immensely popular and was sung by both sides of the American Civil War. It became a hit in England and Ireland as well and was eventually lyrically rewritten and became the related tune "Johnny I Hardly Knew Ye".

=== Alternative versions ===
Quite a few variations on the song, as well as songs set to the same tune but with different lyrics, have appeared since "When Johnny Comes Marching Home" was popularized. The alleged larcenous tendencies of some Union soldiers in New Orleans were parodied in the lyrics "For Bales", to the same tune. A British version appeared in 1914 with a similar title, "When Tommy Comes Marching Home". The 1880 U.S. presidential election campaign featured a campaign song called "If the Johnnies Get into Power," which supported the Republicans James A. Garfield and Chester A. Arthur against the "Johnnies" (Democrats Winfield S. Hancock and William H. English).

The children's songs, "Ants Go Marching", or "Ants Go Marching One By One", and "The Animals Went in Two by Two" ("Into the Ark") re-used the tune and the refrain.

== Lyrics ==
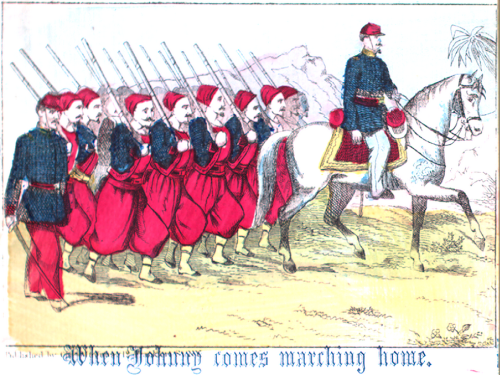
Illustration of a Zouave company on Civil War era broadside of "When Johnny Comes Marching Home".

When Johnny Comes Marching Home (1898) – John Terrell
The second earliest recording of the song, When Johnny Comes Marching Home in 1898 by John Terrell.

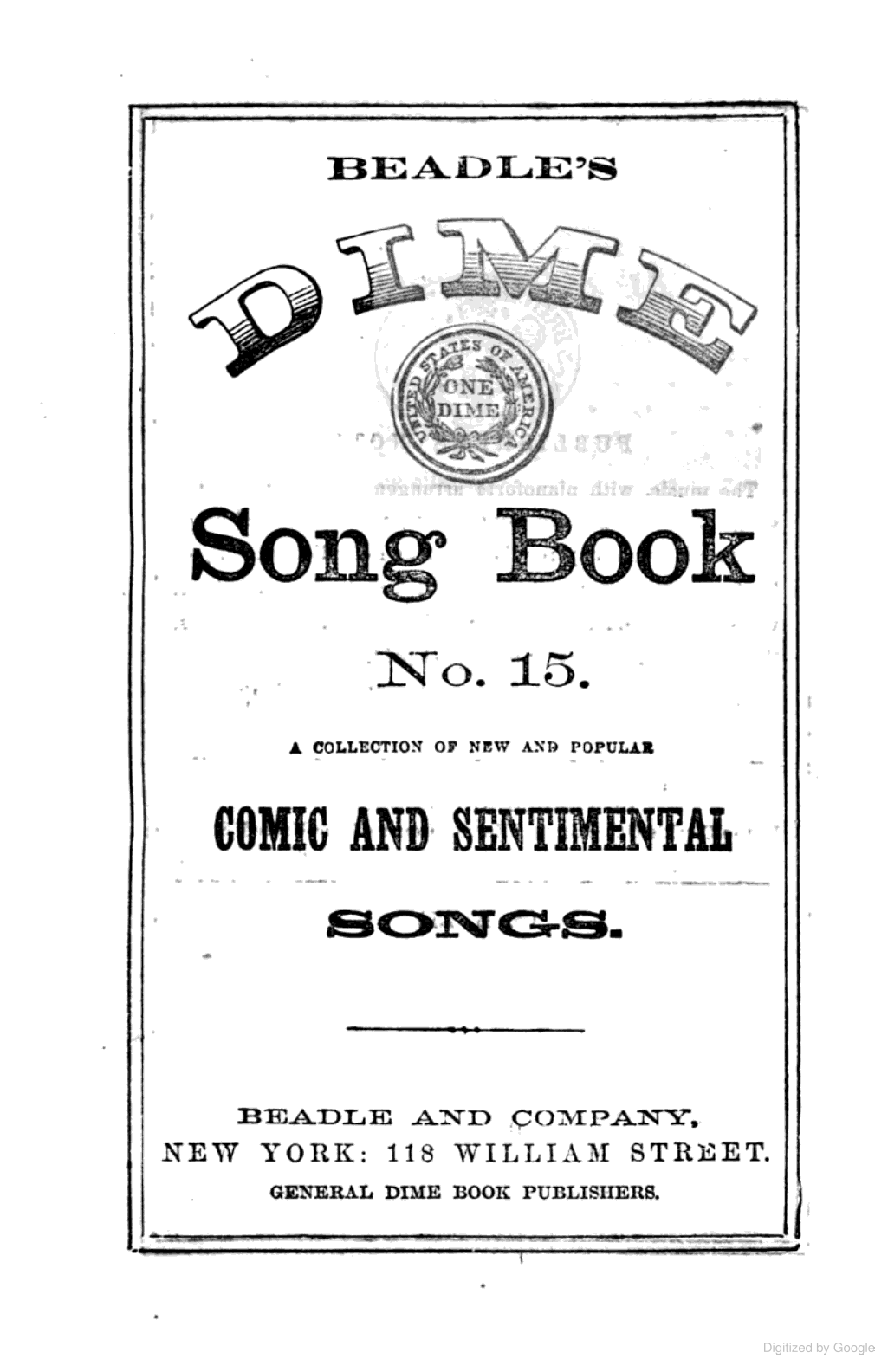
The cover page of the book, "Beadle's Dime Song Book, No. 15: A Collection of the New and Popular Comic and Sentimental Songs", written by Erastus Flavel Beadle

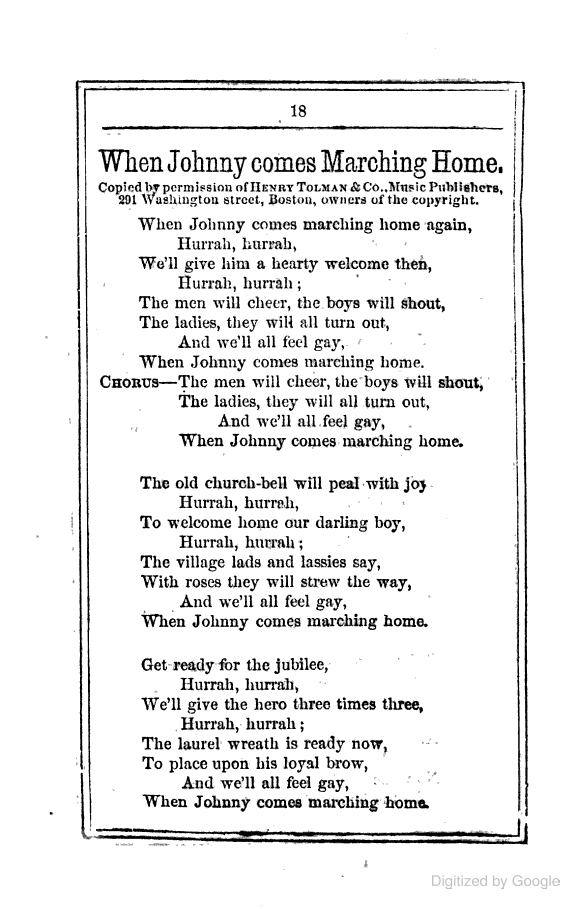
The first part of the song, "When Johnny Comes Marching Home"

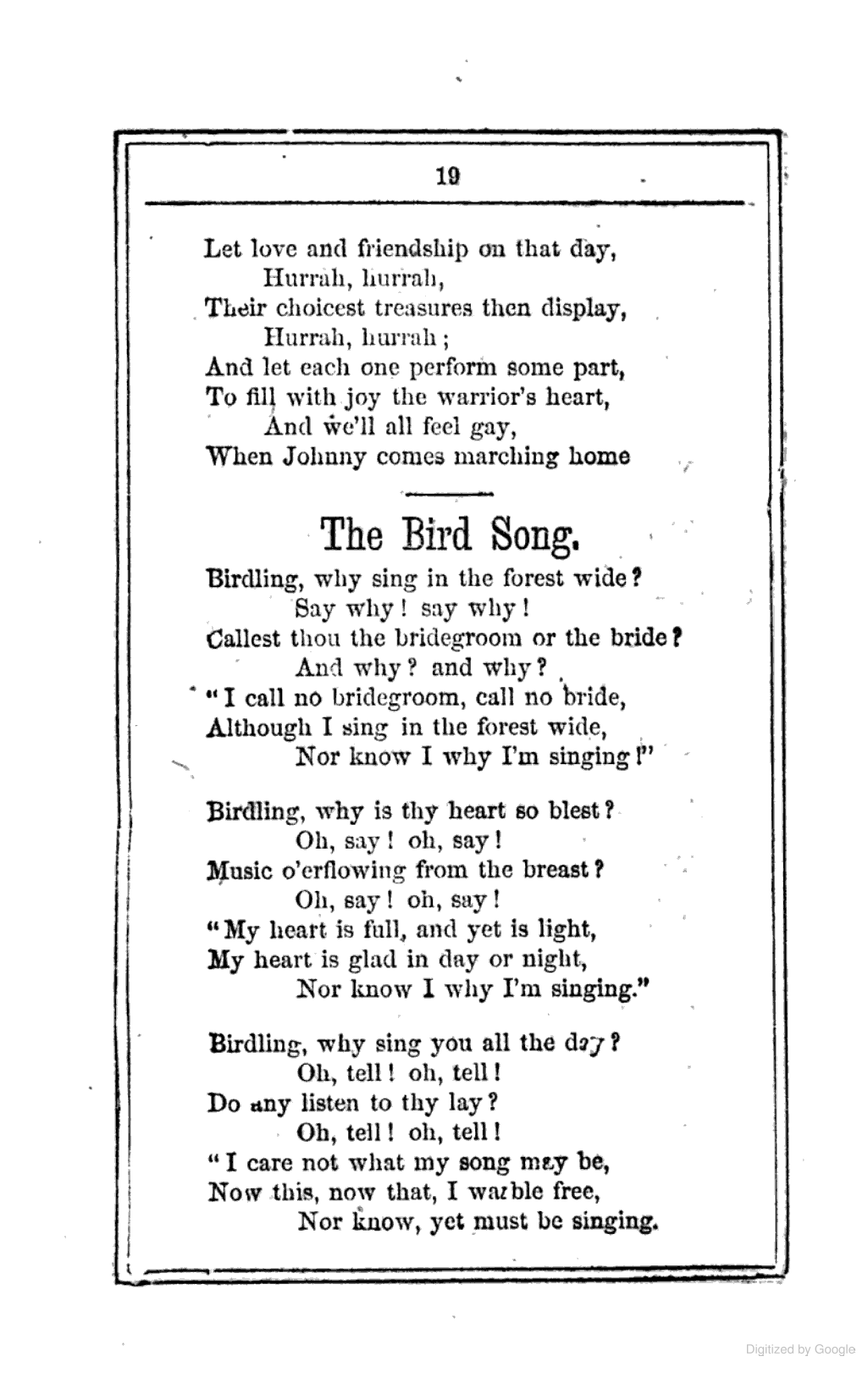
The second part of the song, "When Johnny Comes Marching Home", and the first part of the song, "The Bird Song"

The original lyrics, written by Patrick Gilmore during the American Civil War, were published in 1863 in Erastus Beadle's booklet, Beadle's Dime Song Book, No. 15: A Collection of New and Popular Comic and Sentimental Songs in pages 18 and 19.

When Johnny comes marching home again,
Hurrah, hurrah!
We'll give him a hearty welcome then,
Hurrah, hurrah!
The men will cheer, the boys will shout,
The ladies, they will all turn out,
And we'll all feel gay,
When Johnny comes marching home.

The old church bell will peal with joy,
Hurrah, hurrah!
To welcome home our darling boy,
Hurrah, hurrah!
The village lads and lassies say,
With roses, they will strew the way,
And we'll all feel gay,
When Johnny comes marching home.

Get ready for the jubilee,
Hurrah, hurrah!
We'll give the hero three times three,
Hurrah, hurrah!
The laurel wreath is ready now,
To place upon his loyal brow,
And we'll all feel gay,
When Johnny comes marching home.

Let love and friendship on that day,
Hurrah, hurrah!
Their choicest treasures then display,
Hurrah, hurrah!
And let each one perform some part,
To fill with joy the warrior's heart,
And we'll all feel gay,
When Johnny comes marching home.

Some later recordings substitute glad for gay.

In the John Ford western The Horse Soldiers, the last line was changed to "And we'll all raise hell when Johnny comes marching home".

== "Johnny Fill Up the Bowl" ==
"Johnny Fill Up the Bowl", which provided the tune for "When Johnny Comes Marching Home", was a topical drinking song that commented on events in the American Civil War. It was frequently refitted with new words by soldiers and other publishers.

A satirical variant of "Johnny Fill Up the Bowl", entitled "For Bales" or, more fully, "For Bales! An O'er True Tale. Dedicated to Those Pure Patriots Who Were Afflicted with 'Cotton on the Brain' and Who Saw The Elephant", was published in New Orleans in 1864, by A. E. Blackmar.

== "American Salute" ==
An "American Salute", which is a more modern setting of "When Johnny Comes Marching Home", is the 1942 version of the popular American song created by composer, conductor, and bandleader Morton Gould.

Proposed as a full set of variations on the theme of the song with a bombastic finale that also reprises the theme of the tune, the composition is a staple of American classical music and was recorded many times, especially by the composer himself.

== "Ants Go Marching" ==
The tune and lyrics were adapted by Robert D. Singleton into a children's song, which appeared on the Barney special "Campfire Sing-Along".

== Recordings ==
The song became popular during World War II with recordings in 1942 by Glenn Miller on RCA Bluebird Records with vocals by Tex Beneke, Marion Hutton, and The Modernaires, and Guy Lombardo and The Andrews Sisters on Decca Records.

In 1959, Mitch Miller recorded the song, followed by Jaye P. Morgan the next year.

Jazz organist Jimmy Smith recorded a version for his 1960 album Crazy! Baby.

English pop singer Adam Faith sang a version titled "Johnny Comes Marching Home", used over the opening and closing title credits for the British crime thriller Never Let Go (1960). This version was arranged and conducted by John Barry. Another version was released as a single, reaching No. 5 in the UK Singles Chart.

British punk band The Clash recorded a reworded version in 1978 titled "English Civil War (Johnny Comes Marching Home)". This version was covered by The Levellers on the Julie EP released in 1994.

In 1979, the Bollywood film Baton Baton Mein featured a popular song, "Na Bole Tum, Na Maine Kuch Kaha", using the same tune.

In 1983–84, the French punk band Bérurier Noir took up the melody on the track "Johnny Reviens d'la Guerre" (English: "Johnny returns from the war") from the album Macadam Massacre.

The song "Civil War" from the 1991 album Use Your Illusion II by the US band Guns N' Roses uses the melody of the song "When Johnny Comes Marching Home" in the Axl Rose whistle in the intro and outro of the song.

The 2010 anime series Black Lagoon contains an original rendition of the song from episodes 25 through 28

The 2015 anime film Girls und Panzer der Film contained an original orchestra rendition of the song.

== Bibliography ==
- Erbsen, Wayne: Rousing Songs and True Tales of the Civil War. Native Ground Books & Music, 2008. ISBN 1-883206-33-2
- Lambert, Louis (Patrick Gilmore). "When Johnny Comes Marching Home". Boston: Henry Tolman & Co. (1863)
- Lighter, Jonathan. "The Best Antiwar Song Ever Written," Occasional Papers in Folklore No. 1. CAMSCO Music and Loomis House Press, 2012. ISBN 978-1-935243-89-2
