= The Sounds of Jimmy Smith =

Studio album by Jimmy Smith
- Released: 1957
- Recorded: February 11–13, 1957
- Studio: Manhattan Towers, NYC
- Genre: Jazz
- Length: 38:50
- Label: Blue Note; BLP 1556
- Producer: Alfred Lion

Jimmy Smith chronology
Jimmy Smith at the Organ, Vol. 2 (1957)	The Sounds of Jimmy Smith (1957)	Plays Pretty Just for You (1957)

The Sounds of Jimmy Smith is an album by American jazz organist Jimmy Smith recorded over February 11–13, 1957 and released on Blue Note later that year.

== Reception ==
The AllMusic review by Scott Yanow called the album "Excellent straightahead jazz from the innovative organist".

Professional ratings
Review scores
Source	Rating
AllMusic	3/5 stars

== Track listing ==
=== Side 1 ===
1. "There Will Never Be Another You" (Mack Gordon, Harry Warren) – 5:35
2. "The Fight" (Jimmy Smith) – 5:05
3. "Blue Moon" (Lorenz Hart, Richard Rodgers) – 8:42

=== Side 2 ===
1. "All the Things You Are" (Oscar Hammerstein II, Jerome Kern) – 5:37
2. "Zing! Went the Strings of My Heart" (James F. Hanley) – 8:37
3. "Somebody Loves Me" (Buddy DeSylva, Ballard MacDonald, George Gershwin) – 5:14

=== Bonus tracks on 2003 CD reissue ===
7. "First Night Blues" (Smith) – 8:06
8. "Cherokee" (Ray Noble) – 8:12
9. "The Third Day" (Smith) – 6:41

- Recorded at Manhattan Towers in New York City on February 11 (tracks 5 & 7), February 12 (track 6) and February 13 (tracks 1–4, 8 & 9), 1957

== Personnel ==
=== Musicians ===
==== February 11, 1957 ====
- Jimmy Smith – organ
- Eddie McFadden – guitar
- Art Blakey – drums

==== February 12 & 13, 1957 ====
- Jimmy Smith – organ
- Eddie McFadden – guitar (except "The Fight", "All the Things You Are", "The Third Day")
- Donald Bailey – drums (except "The Fight", "All the Things You Are", "The Third Day")

=== Technical ===
- Alfred Lion – producer
- Rudy Van Gelder – recording engineer
- Harold Feinstein – photography
- Leonard Feather – liner notes
