= Cool Blues =

Live album by Jimmy Smith
- Released: 1980
- Recorded: April 7, 1958
- Venue: Small's Paradise, New York City
- Genre: Jazz
- Length: 72:21
- Label: Blue Note; LT-1054
- Producer: Alfred Lion

Jimmy Smith chronology
| Softly as a Summer Breeze (1958) | Cool Blues (1980) | Six Views of the Blues (1958) |

CD reissue cover

Cool Blues is a live album by American jazz organist Jimmy Smith, featuring performances recorded at Small's Paradise in New York City in 1958, but not released on the Blue Note label until 1980. The album was rereleased on CD with three bonus tracks recorded at the same performance.

== Reception ==
The AllMusic review by Scott Yanow stated, "The repertoire is filled with blues and bop standards, and the soloing is at a consistently high and hard-swinging level. Jimmy Smith fans will be pleased".

Professional ratings
Review scores
| Source | Rating |
|---|---|
| AllMusic | 4.5/5 stars |
| The Penguin Guide to Jazz | 3/4 stars |
| The Rolling Stone Jazz Record Guide | 3/5 stars |

== Track listing ==
1. "Dark Eyes" (Traditional) – 11:43
2. "Groovin' at Small's" (Babs Gonzales) – 12:01
3. Announcements by Babs Gonzales – 0:26 Bonus track on CD reissue
4. "A Night in Tunisia" (Dizzy Gillespie) – 17:04
5. "Cool Blues" (Charlie Parker) – 11:07
6. "What's New?" (Bob Haggart, Johnny Burke) – 6:18 Bonus track on CD reissue
7. "Small's Minor" (Jimmy Smith) – 6:44 Bonus track on CD reissue
8. "Once in a While" (Michael Edwards, Bud Green) – 6:46 Bonus track on CD reissue
- Recorded at Small's Paradise in New York City on April 7, 1958

== Personnel ==
Musicians

- Jimmy Smith – organ
- Lou Donaldson – alto saxophone (tracks 1–6,8)
- Tina Brooks – tenor saxophone (tracks 1–5)
- Eddie McFadden – guitar
- Art Blakey – drums, (tracks 1–4)
- Donald Bailey – drums, (tracks 5–8)

Production

- Alfred Lion – producer
- Rudy Van Gelder – engineer
- Bill Burks – design
- Mark Lipson – photography
- Michael Cuscuna – liner notes
