= Who's Afraid of Virginia Woolf? (album) =

Studio album by Jimmy Smith
- Released: March 1964
- Recorded: January 20–21 & 27, 1964
- Studio: Van Gelder Studio, Englewood Cliffs NJ
- Genre: Jazz
- Length: 35:06
- Label: Verve; V6-8583
- Producer: Creed Taylor

Jimmy Smith chronology
The Cat (1964)	Who's Afraid of Virginia Woolf? (1964)	Christmas '64 (1964)

Singles from Who's Afraid of Virginia Woolf?
- 1. "Who's Afraid of Virginia Woolf?, Pt. 1" Released: April 1964

Professional ratings
Review scores
Source	Rating
DownBeat	4.5/5 stars
Allmusic	2.5/5 stars

Who's Afraid of Virginia Woolf? is a 1964 studio album, by organist Jimmy Smith, and released on the Verve label. Smith is accompanied by a big band, with arrangements by Oliver Nelson and Claus Ogerman.

== Reception ==
The album received 4½ "stars" from "DownBeat" magazine. Their review stated

Smith has been consistently paring his technique through the years, and this album has reached a zenith in his use of simplicity and taste.....

AllMusic reviewer Michael G. Nastos, only gave the album 2½ stars stating that:

The music tends to be corny and overly dramatic, based in soul-jazz and boogaloo; it's dated even for this time period (1964) and a bit bland... A curiosity in his discography, for some an "experiment" that never worked, and for others an interesting aside, one wonders what Smith really thought of this project after the fact, considering his far greater works.

The album was Smith's third highest-charting album, on which he spent 31 weeks; it charted as high as number 16, on the US Billboard 200 charts.

== Track listing ==
1. "Slaughter on Tenth Avenue" (Richard Rodgers) – 7:06
2. "Who's Afraid of Virginia Woolf?, Pt. 1" (Don Kirkpatrick, Keith Knox) – 4:29
3. "Who's Afraid of Virginia Woolf?, Pt. 2" (Kirkpatrick, Knox) – 5:00
4. "John Brown's Body" (Traditional) – 5:18
5. "Wives and Lovers" (Burt Bacharach, Hal David) – 3:17
6. "Women of the World" (Riziero Ortolani) – 5:47
7. "Bluesette" (Toots Thielemans) – 3:40

Recorded on January 20 (#1), 21 (#2–3) and January 27 (#4–7), 1964.

== Personnel ==
=== Musicians ===
- Jimmy Smith – organ
- Oliver Nelson – arranger (#1–3)
- Claus Ogerman – arranger, conductor

=== Technical ===
- Creed Taylor – producer
- Val Valentin – engineer
- Rudy Van Gelder – engineer
- Acy Lehman – design
- Roy De Carava – photography
- Daddio Daylie – liner notes

== Chart performance ==
=== Album ===
Chart (1964)	Peak position	Total weeks
U.S. Billboard 200	16	31

=== Single ===
Year	Single	Chart	Position
1964	"Who's Afraid of Virginia Woolf?, Pt. 1"	Billboard Hot 100	72
