= The Cat (album) =

Studio album by Jimmy Smith
- Released: September 1964
- Recorded: April 27–29, 1964
- Studio: Van Gelder Studio, Englewood Cliffs, New Jersey
- Genre: Jazz
- Length: 32:44
- Label: Verve
- Producer: Creed Taylor

Jimmy Smith chronology
Blue Bash! (1963)	The Cat (1964)	Who's Afraid of Virginia Woolf? (1964)

Singles from The Cat
- 1. "The Cat" Released: August 1964

Professional ratings
Review scores
Source	Rating
AllMusic	4/5 stars
The Penguin Guide to Jazz	3/4 stars

The Cat is a 1964 album by Jimmy Smith. It features Smith on Hammond B-3 organ with big band arrangements by composer Lalo Schifrin. The album reached number 12 on the Billboard 200 chart. Its title track peaked at number 67 on the Billboard Hot 100 for the weeks of September 26 and October 3, 1964.

== Track listing ==
All tracks arranged by Lalo Schifrin

1. "Theme from Joy House" (Lalo Schifrin) – 4:38
2. "The Cat" (from Joy House) (Lalo Schifrin, Rick Ward) – 3:24
3. "Basin Street Blues" (Spencer Williams) – 4:00
4. "Main Title from The Carpetbaggers" (Elmer Bernstein, Ray Colcord) – 3:56
5. "Chicago Serenade" (Eddie Harris) – 3:55
6. "St. Louis Blues" (W.C. Handy) – 3:18
7. "Delon's Blues" (Smith) – 4:48
8. "Blues in the Night" (Harold Arlen, Johnny Mercer) – 4:45

== Personnel ==
=== Musicians ===
- Jimmy Smith – organ
- Lalo Schifrin – conductor
- Ray Alonge, Earl Chapin, Bill Correa, Jimmy Buffington – French horn
- Bernie Glow, Thad Jones, Jimmy Maxwell, Marky Markowitz, Ernie Royal, Snooky Young – trumpet
- Jimmy Cleveland, Urbie Green, Billy Byers – trombone
- Tony Studd – bass trombone
- Don Butterfield – tuba
- Kenny Burrell – guitar
- George Duvivier – bass
- Grady Tate – drums
- Phil Kraus – percussion

=== Technical personnel ===
- Creed Taylor – producer
- Val Valentin – director of engineering
- Rudy Van Gelder – engineer
- Ken Whitmore – photography
- Al Collins – liner notes

== Chart performance ==
=== Album ===
Chart (1964)	Peak position
US Billboard 200	12

=== Single ===
Year	Single	Chart	Position
1964	"The Cat"	Billboard Hot 100	67
