= Prayer Meetin' =

Studio album by Jimmy Smith with Stanley Turrentine
- Released: 1964
- Recorded: February 8, 1963
- Studio: Van Gelder Studio, Englewood Cliffs
- Genre: Jazz
- Length: 39:16 original LP; 55:23 CD reissue
- Label: Blue Note; BST 84164
- Producer: Alfred Lion

Jimmy Smith chronology
Rockin' the Boat (1963)	Prayer Meetin' (1964)	Hobo Flats (1963)

Prayer Meetin' is an album by the American jazz organist Jimmy Smith, recorded in 1963 and released on the Blue Note label. The album was rereleased on CD with two bonus tracks from the same session.

== Reception ==
The AllMusic review by Steve Leggett stated:

"Prayer Meetin' is a delight from start to finish".

Professional ratings
Review scores
Source	Rating
AllMusic	4.5/5 stars
The Penguin Guide to Jazz	3/4 stars

== Track listing ==
1. "Prayer Meeting" (Jimmy Smith) – 5:45
2. "I Almost Lost My Mind" (Ivory Joe Hunter) – 9:25
3. "Stone Cold Dead in the Market" (Wilmoth Houdini) – 3:43
4. "When the Saints Go Marching In" (Traditional) – 6:15
5. "Red Top" (Gene Ammons) – 7:38
6. "Picnickin'" (Smith) – 6:30
7. "Lonesome Road" (Gene Austin, Nathaniel Shilkret) – 8:55 Bonus track on CD reissue
8. "Smith Walk" (Smith) – 7:12 Bonus track on CD reissue

NOTE: "Lonesome Road" and "Smith Walk" are bonus tracks on a CD reissue that were recorded on June 13, 1960, featuring the same lineup plus Sam Jones on bass.

== Personnel ==
Musicians

- Jimmy Smith – organ
- Stanley Turrentine – tenor saxophone
- Quentin Warren – guitar
- Donald Bailey – drums
- Sam Jones – bass (tracks 7–8)

Technical

- Alfred Lion – producer
- Rudy Van Gelder – engineer
- Reid Miles – design
- Francis Wolff – photography
- Joe Goldberg – liner notes

== Chart performance ==
=== Album ===
Chart (1964)	Peak position	Total weeks
U.S. Billboard 200	86	20
