= Angel Eyes: Ballads & Slow Jams =

Studio album by Jimmy Smith
- Released: November 5, 1996
- Recorded: January 25–26, 1995
- Genre: Jazz
- Length: 47:12
- Label: Verve
- Producer: Richard Seidel; Don Sickler

Jimmy Smith chronology
Damn! (1995)	Angel Eyes: Ballads & Slow Jams (1996)	Dot Com Blues (2001)

Angel Eyes: Ballads & Slow Jams is a 1996 album by the American jazz organist Jimmy Smith. The album was Smith's penultimate album, and his last recording for five years.

On the Billboard Top Jazz Album charts Angel Eyes: Ballads & Slow Jams peaked at number 22.

== Reception ==
Professional ratings
Review scores
Source	Rating
Allmusic	3/5 stars

The Allmusic review by Scott Yanow awarded the album three stars and wrote that "Despite the constant changing of instrumentation, the results (although pleasant) are uneventful and somewhat predictable. Good for late-night background music rather than for close listening."

== Track listing ==
1. "Stolen Moments" (Oliver Nelson) - 7:00
2. "You Better Go Now" (Robert Graham, Bickley S. Reichmer) - 5:15
3. "Angel Eyes" (Earl Brent, Matt Dennis) - 8:00
4. "Oh Bess, Oh Where's My Bess?" (George Gershwin, Ira Gershwin, DuBose Heyward) - 4:10
5. "Slow Freight" (Ray Bryant) - 5:52
6. "Tenderly" (Walter Gross, Jack Lawrence) - 6:25
7. "Days of Wine and Roses" (Henry Mancini, Johnny Mercer) - 7:00
8. "Li'l Darlin'" (Neal Hefti) - 6:15
9. "What a Wonderful World" (Bob Thiele, George David Weiss) - 4:25

== Personnel ==
Musicians

- Jimmy Smith – organ, arranger
- Roy Hargrove – flugelhorn, trumpet
- Nicholas Payton – trumpet
- Mark Whitfield – guitar
- Christian McBride – double bass
- Damon Krukowski – drums, percussion
- Gregory Hutchinson – drums

Production

- Richard Seidel – liner notes, producer
- Allan Tucker – mastering
- Chris Albert – mixing assistant
- Jimmy Katz – photography
- James Minchin
- Don Sickler – producer
- Camille Tominaro – production coordinator
- Jim Anderson – engineer, mixing
- Giulio Turturro – art direction, design
- Scott Austin – assistant engineer
