= Any Number Can Win (album) =

Studio album by Jimmy Smith
- Released: 1963
- Recorded: July 10, 17, 25 & 29, 1963
- Genre: Jazz
- Length: 36:03 CD reissue
- Label: Verve; V-8618
- Producer: Creed Taylor (original), Richard Seidel (reissue)

Jimmy Smith chronology
Hobo Flats (1963)	Any Number Can Win (1963)	Blue Bash! (1963)

Singles from Any Number Can Win
- 1. "Theme From "Any Number Can Win"" Released: September 1963

Any Number Can Win is an album by the American jazz organist Jimmy Smith, arranged by Billy Byers and Claus Ogerman.

On the Billboard albums chart, Any Number Can Win peaked at number 25, and the single of Smith's "(Theme From) Any Number Can Win" peaked at 96 on both the Billboard Hot 100 and on the Hot R&B Sides chart.

Professional ratings
Review scores
Source	Rating
AllMusic	2.5/5 stars
The Penguin Guide to Jazz	3/4 stars
Record Mirror	3/5 stars

== Track listing ==
1. "You Came a Long Way from St. Louis" (John Benson Brooks, Bob Russell) – 4:21
2. "The Ape Woman" (Lalo Schifrin) – 3:21
3. "Georgia on My Mind" (Hoagy Carmichael, Stuart Gorrell) – 2:28
4. "G'won Train" (Patti Bown) – 4:21
5. "(Theme From) Any Number Can Win" (Michel Magne) – 2:10
6. "What'd I Say" (Ray Charles) – 2:51
7. "The Sermon" (Jimmy Smith) – 7:40
8. "Ruby" (Mitchell Parish, Heinz Roemheld) – 2:20
9. "Tubs" (Smith) – 2:48
10. "Blues for C.A." (Smith) – 3:43 Dedicated to Clarence Avant

== Personnel ==
=== Musicians ===
- Jimmy Smith – Hammond organ
- Bob Bushnell – bass guitar (tracks 2, 5, 10)
- Art Davis – double bass (tracks 1–2, 4, 9–10)
- George Duvivier – double bass (tracks 6–7)
- Milt Hinton – double bass (tracks 3, 8)
- Ed Shaughnessy – drums (tracks 1–2, 4, 9–10)
- Doug Allen – drums (tracks 3, 5, 7)
- Mel Lewis – drums (tracks 6–7)
- Billy Mure – guitar (tracks 3, 5, 7)
- Kenny Burrell – guitar (tracks 3, 5–8)
- Vince Gambella – guitar (tracks 3, 5, 7)
- George Devens – percussion (tracks 1–2, 4, 9–10)
- Jimmy Cleveland, Melba Liston, Paul Faulise – trombone (tracks 1–2, 4, 9–10)
- Charlie Shavers – trumpet (tracks 1–2, 4)
- Snooky Young – trumpet (tracks 2, 10)
- Jimmy Maxwell – trumpet (tracks 1–2, 4, 9–10)
- Joe Newman – trumpet (tracks 1–2, 4–5 9–10)
- James Sedlar – trumpet (track 5)
- Budd Johnson – woodwind (tracks 1–2, 4–5 9–10)
- Jerome Richardson – woodwind (track 5)
- Jerry Dodgion, Marvin Halladay, Phil Woods, Seldon Powell – woodwinds (tracks 1–2, 4, 9–10)

=== Technical ===
- Creed Taylor – producer
- Billy Byers – arranger (tracks 2, 4, 10)
- Claus Ogerman – arranger (tracks 1, 9), conductor (tracks 1–2, 4, 9–10)
- Richard Seidel – reissue production
- Rudy Van Gelder, Phil Macy, Phil Ramone – recording engineers
- Val Valentin – director of engineering

== Chart performance ==
=== Album ===
Chart (1963)	Peak position	Total weeks
U.S. Billboard 200	26	33

=== Single ===
Year	Single	Chart	Position
1963	"(Theme From) Any Number Can Win"	Billboard Hot 100	96
