= Blue Bash! =

Studio album by Kenny Burrell and Jimmy Smith
- Released: 1963
- Recorded: July 16, 25–26, 1963; New York City
- Genre: Jazz
- Label: Verve; V-8553
- Producer: Creed Taylor

Kenny Burrell chronology
Lotsa Bossa Nova (1963)	Blue Bash! (1963)	Travelin' Light (1964)

Jimmy Smith chronology
Any Number Can Win (1963)	Blue Bash! (1963)	The Cat (1964)

Professional ratings
Review scores
Source	Rating
AllMusic	3/5 stars
The Penguin Guide to Jazz Recordings	3.5/4 stars

Blue Bash! is an album by the guitarist Kenny Burrell and organist Jimmy Smith, recorded in 1963 and released on the Verve label.

== Chart performance ==
The album debuted on Billboard magazine's Top LP's chart in the issue dated November 30, 1963, peaking at No. 108 during a four-week run on the chart.

== Track listing ==
1. "Blue Bash" (Jimmy Smith) – 5:05
2. "Travelin'" (Traditional) – 5:28
3. "Fever" (Eddie Cooley, John Davenport) – 5:35
4. "Blues For Del" (Kenny Burrell) – 6:15
5. "Easy Living" (Leo Robin, Ralph Rainger) – 2:52
6. "Soft Winds" (Benny Goodman) – 5:44
7. "Kenny's Sound" (Burrell)– 3:50

== Personnel ==
Musicians

- Kenny Burrell – guitar
- Jimmy Smith – organ
- Milt Hinton – bass (tracks 2–4 & 6)
- George Duvivier – bass (track 5)
- Mel Lewis – drums, (tracks 1–4, 6–7)
- Bill English – drums (track 5)
- Vince Gambella – 2nd guitar (tracks 1 & 7) note: not originally credited

Technical

- Creed Taylor – producer
- Val Valentin – engineer
- Phil Macy, Phil Ramone, Rudy Van Gelder – assistant engineers
- Lee Friedlander – photography
- Del Shields – liner notes

== Charts ==
Chart (1963)	Peak position
US Billboard Top LPs	108
