= Crazy! Baby =

Studio album by the Incredible Jimmy Smith
- Released: 1960
- Recorded: January 4, 1960
- Studio: Van Gelder Studio; Englewood Cliffs, New Jersey
- Genre: Jazz
- Length: 51:54 (CD)
- Label: Blue Note
- Producer: Alfred Lion

Jimmy Smith chronology
| The Sermon (1959) | Crazy! Baby (1960) | Open House (1960) |

Singles from Crazy! Baby
- 1. "Mack the Knife" Released: 1960

Crazy! Baby is an album by American jazz organist Jimmy Smith, recorded on January 4, 1960 and released on Blue Note later that year.

== Production and recording ==
It was the first album Smith recorded at Rudy Van Gelder's studio in Englewood Cliffs, New Jersey.

== Reception ==
The AllMusic review by Scott Yanow states, "Smith is heard in peak form... Despite claims and some strong challenges by others, there has never been a jazz organist on the level of Jimmy Smith."

Professional ratings
Review scores
| Source | Rating |
|---|---|
| AllMusic | 4.5/5 stars |
| The Penguin Guide to Jazz | 2.5/4 stars |

== Track listing ==
=== Side 1 ===
1. "When Johnny Comes Marching Home" (Traditional) – 7:58
2. "Makin' Whoopee" (Walter Donaldson, Gus Kahn) – 4:57
3. "A Night in Tunisia" (Dizzy Gillespie) – 5:40

=== Side 2 ===
1. "Sonnymoon for Two" (Sonny Rollins) – 7:15
2. "Mack the Knife" (Bertolt Brecht, Kurt Weill) – 4:58
3. "What's New?" (Bob Haggart, Johnny Burke) – 3:50
4. "Alfredo" (Jimmy Smith) – 4:30

=== CD reissue bonus tracks ===
8. "If I Should Lose You" (Ralph Rainger, Leo Robin) – 6:26
9. "When Lights Are Low" (Benny Carter, Spencer Williams) – 5:38

== Personnel ==
=== Musicians ===
- Jimmy Smith – organ
- Quentin Warren – guitar
- Donald Bailey – drums

=== Technical ===
- Alfred Lion – producer
- Rudy Van Gelder – recording engineer, mastering
- Reid Miles – design
- Bob Ganley – photography
- Leonard Feather – liner notes
