= The Sermon (Jimmy Smith album) =

The Sermon!

Studio album by Jimmy Smith
- Released: December 1959
- Recorded: August 25, 1957 – February 25, 1958
- Studios: Manhattan Towers, NYC
- Genre: Soul jazz
- Length: 40:10
- Labels: Blue Note; BLP 4011
- Producer: Alfred Lion

Jimmy Smith chronology
House Party (1958)	The Sermon! (1959)	Crazy! Baby (1959)

The Sermon! is the eleventh studio album by jazz organist Jimmy Smith, recorded on August 25, 1957 and February 25, 1958 and released on Blue Note in 1959—Smith's fifteenth album for the label.

== Background ==
The Sermon! was the second of two albums recorded on two dates at The Manhattan Towers Hotel Ballroom; the first was Smith's previous album, House Party (1958). Rudy Van Gelder used the ballroom as a recording studio for recording sessions in 1957–1958, while he was still using his parents' Hackensack, New Jersey home studio to record artists for Blue Note. He mainly used it for larger groups of musicians that would not fit in his parents' living room, or when New York was a more convenient location to record the artists involved.

Hammond organ settings used on The Sermon:

- Top Manual (Lead Lines): 888000000 drawbar setting, no percussion, C2 vibrato. The Leslie is set to single speed (no chorale), and the key click and overdrive from the amp are prominent.
- Bottom Manual (Walking Bass and Comping): 838000000 drawbar setting.

The session for The Sermon was recorded for Blue Note by Rudy Van Gelder, using the typical 1957 technology: tube preamps for warm overdrive, and ribbon microphones likely used for their smooth, natural response. The tube overdrive from the preamps used in the recording of The Sermon contributed a fat, edgy warmth to the sound. Tube preamps are known for adding harmonic distortion, which can round off the harshness of sound while giving it a pleasing richness, a bit of "grit". When the signal passes through tube preamps, the natural compression and distortion inherent to tubes can introduce harmonic overtones that give the sound a rougher, more textured quality. This “grit” is particularly noticeable on sustained notes or louder passages, where the tubes naturally start to break up and provide a more aggressive, punchy tone. In the case of The Sermon, that grit contributed to the organ’s punch and presence, giving Jimmy Smith’s sound its signature edge and making it feel more alive and raw. This combination of settings and recording technology gave the album its rich, classic sound.

== Reception ==
Professional ratings
Review scores
Source	Rating
AllMusic	4/5 stars
DownBeat	3/5 stars

AllMusic's Lindsay Planer described the album as "a prime example of Smith and company's myriad of talents".

== Track listing ==
All tracks are written by Jimmy Smith, except as noted.

Side 1
No.	Title	Date recorded	Length
1.	"The Sermon"	February 25, 1958	20:12

Side 2
No.	Title	Writer(s)	Date recorded	Length
1.	"J.O.S."		August 25, 1957	11:56
2.	"Flamingo"	Edmund Anderson; Ted Grouya	February 25, 1958	8:02

== Personnel ==
=== Musicians ===
==== August 25, 1957 ====
- Jimmy Smith – organ
- Lee Morgan – trumpet
- George Coleman – alto saxophone
- Eddie McFadden – guitar
- Donald Bailey – drums

==== February 25, 1958 ====
- Jimmy Smith – organ
- Lee Morgan – trumpet
- Lou Donaldson – alto saxophone ("The Sermon")
- Tina Brooks – tenor saxophone ("The Sermon")
- Kenny Burrell – guitar
- Art Blakey – drums

=== Technical personnel ===
- Alfred Lion – producer
- Rudy Van Gelder – recording engineer
- Reid Miles – design
- Francis Wolff – photography
- Ira Gitler – liner notes
