= Plain Talk (album) =

Studio album by Jimmy Smith
- Released: April 1968
- Recorded: March 22, 1960
- Studio: Van Gelder Studio, Englewood Cliffs
- Genre: Jazz blues
- Length: 38:21
- Label: Blue Note; BST 84296
- Producer: Alfred Lion

Jimmy Smith chronology
Stay Loose (1968)	Plain Talk (1968)	Livin' It Up! (1968)

Plain Talk is a studio album by American jazz organist Jimmy Smith featuring performances recorded in 1960 but not released on the Blue Note label until 1968. The album was rereleased on CD combined with Open House (1960) in 1992 compiling all the recordings from the session.

== Reception ==
The Allmusic review by Michael Erlewine awarded the album 4 stars calling it "a fast-paced studio jam session".

Professional ratings
Review scores
Source	Rating
Allmusic	4/5 stars

== Track listing ==
1. "Big Fat Mama" (Lucky Millinder, Stafford Simon) – 11:12
2. "My One and Only Love" (Robert Mellin, Guy Wood) – 5:14
3. "Plain Talk" (Jimmy Smith) – 15:24
4. "Time After Time" (Cahn, Styne) – 6:31

== Personnel ==
=== Musicians ===
- Jimmy Smith – organ
- Blue Mitchell – trumpet (tracks 1, 2, 3; feature track 2)
- Jackie McLean – alto saxophone (track 3)
- Ike Quebec – tenor saxophone (tracks 1, 3, 4; feature track 4)
- Quentin Warren – guitar
- Donald Bailey – drums

=== Technical ===
- Alfred Lion – producer
- Rudy Van Gelder – engineer
- Photomedia – photography
- Nat Hentoff – liner notes
