= Midnight Special (Jimmy Smith album) =

Studio album by Jimmy Smith
- Released: November 1961
- Recorded: April 25, 1960
- Studio: Van Gelder Studio, Englewood Cliffs
- Genre: Jazz
- Length: 36:43
- Label: Blue Note; BST 84078
- Producer: Alfred Lion

Jimmy Smith chronology
Home Cookin' (1961)	Midnight Special (1961)	Plays Fats Waller (1962)

Midnight Special is an album by the American jazz organist Jimmy Smith, recorded in 1960 and released on the Blue Note label. The album was recorded at the same session that produced Back at the Chicken Shack (1960).

== Reception ==
The AllMusic review by Scott Yanow called the album "highly recommended".

Professional ratings
Review scores
Source	Rating
AllMusic	5/5 stars
DownBeat (Original LP release)	3/5 stars
The Penguin Guide to Jazz	2.5/4 stars
The Rolling Stone Jazz Record Guide	3/5 stars

== Track listing ==
1. "Midnight Special" (Jimmy Smith) – 9:57
2. "A Subtle One" (Turrentine) – 7:44
3. "Jumpin' the Blues" (Walter Brown, Jay McShann, Parker) – 5:27
4. "Why Was I Born?" (Hammerstein II, Kern) – 6:35
5. "One O'Clock Jump" (Basie) – 7:00

== Personnel ==
- Jimmy Smith – organ
- Stanley Turrentine – tenor saxophone
- Kenny Burrell – guitar (1,3,5)
- Donald Bailey – drums

== Production ==
- Alfred Lion – producer
- Rudy Van Gelder – engineer
- Reid Miles – design
- Francis Wolff – photography
- Del Shields – liner notes
