= Dot Com Blues =

Studio album by Jimmy Smith
- Released: January 9, 2001
- Recorded: February 1–2, March 25, April 24–25, and June 5, 2000
- Studio: Cello Recording, Los Angeles
- Genre: Jazz
- Length: 60:28
- Label: Verve/Blue Thumb
- Producer: John Porter; Ron Goldstein

Jimmy Smith chronology
Angel Eyes: Ballads & Slow Jams (1996)	Dot Com Blues (2001)

Dot Com Blues is a 2001 album by the American jazz organist Jimmy Smith. The album was Smith's first recording for five years, and features guest appearances by B.B. King and Etta James.

On the Billboard Top Jazz Album charts Dot Com Blues peaked at number 8.

== Reception ==
Professional ratings
Review scores
Source	Rating
Allmusic	3/5 stars
The Penguin Guide to Jazz	2.5/4 stars

The Allmusic review by Roy Wynn awarded the album three stars and said the album was "...something of a blues sampler with Smith playing a prominent role rather than a Jimmy Smith album. Jazz fans will be happy to know that, after more than 40 years of recording, Smith retains his ability to play, but Dot Com Blues is anything but a showcase for the man whose name is on the cover."

== Track listing ==
1. "Only in It for the Money" (Dr. John) - 4:35
2. "8 Counts for Rita" (Jimmy Smith) - 3:39
3. "Strut" (Taj Mahal) - 5:03
4. "C.C. Rider" (Ma Rainey, Traditional) - 7:09
5. "I Just Wanna Make Love to You" (Willie Dixon) - 3:55
6. "Mood Indigo" (Barney Bigard, Duke Ellington, Irving Mills) - 8:49
7. "Over and Over" (Keb' Mo') - 5:53
8. "Three O'Clock Blues" (Jules Bihari, B.B. King) - 4:33
9. "Dot Com Blues" (Smith) - 5:22
10. "Mr. Johnson" (John, Smith) - 5:47
11. "Tuition Blues" (Smith) - 5:51
12. "Since I Met You Baby" (Ivory Joe Hunter) - 6:35 (Japanese Bonus Track)

== Personnel ==
Musicians

- Jimmy Smith - organ, arranger
- Dr. John - piano, Wurlitzer electric piano, vocals, (tracks: 1)
- Jon Cleary - Wurlitzer electric piano (tracks: 7)
- Chris Stainton - piano (tracks: 8)
- Etta James - vocals (tracks: 5)
- Sir Harry Bowens - vocals (tracks: 5, 7)
- Sweet Pea Atkinson - vocals (tracks: 5, 7)
- B.B. King - guitar, vocals (tracks: 8)
- Taj Mahal - guitar, vocals (tracks: 3)
- Keb' Mo' - guitar, vocals (tracks: 7)
- Russell Malone - guitar (tracks: 2 to 4, 6, 9, 11)
- John Porter - guitar (tracks: 1, 5, 8, 10)
- Phil Upchurch - guitar (tracks: 5, 7, 10)
- Neil Hubbard - guitar (tracks: 8)
- Reggie McBride - bass guitar (tracks: 1 to 5, 7, 9 to 11)
- John Porter - bass guitar (tracks: 5)
- Pino Palladino - bass guitar (tracks: 8)
- John Clayton - double bass (tracks: 6)
- Harvey Mason - drums (tracks: 1 to 7, 9 to 11)
- Andy Newmark - drums (tracks: 8)
- Lenny Castro - percussion (tracks: 1 to 3, 5, 7, 10)
- Darrell Leonard - horn arrangements, trumpet (tracks: 1, 5, 7)
- Oscar Brashear - flugelhorn, trumpet (tracks: 1, 5, 7)
- Leslie Drayton - flugelhorn, trumpet (tracks: 1, 5, 7)
- George Bohannon - trombone, bass trombone (tracks: 1, 5, 7)
- Maurice Spears - trombone, bass trombone (tracks: 1, 5, 7)
- Joe Sublett - tenor saxophone (tracks: 1, 5, 7, 10)
- Herman Riley - tenor saxophone (tracks: 1, 5, 10)

Production

- Hollis King - art direction
- Billy Kinsley - assistant engineer
- Mike Scotella
- Katy Teasdale
- David Riegel - design
- Rik Pekkonen - engineer
- Ron Goldstein - executive producer
- Barbara Farman - hair stylist, make-up
- Bernie Grundman - mastering
- James Minchin - photography
- John Newcott - release coordinator
