= Bashin': The Unpredictable Jimmy Smith =

Studio album by Jimmy Smith
- Released: May 1962
- Recorded: March 26 & 28, 1962
- Studio: Van Gelder Studio, Englewood Cliffs, New Jersey
- Genre: Jazz
- Length: 38:30
- Label: Verve; V6-8474
- Producer: Creed Taylor

Jimmy Smith chronology
Plays Fats Waller (1962)	Bashin': The Unpredictable Jimmy Smith (1962)	Rockin' the Boat (1963)

Singles from Bashin': The Unpredictable Jimmy Smith
- 1. "Walk on the Wild Side" Released: April 1962

Professional ratings
Review scores
Source	Rating
AllMusic	5/5 stars
The Encyclopedia of Popular Music	5/5 stars
The Penguin Guide to Jazz	4/4 stars

Bashin': The Unpredictable Jimmy Smith is a 1962 studio album by the American jazz organist Jimmy Smith, accompanied by a big band arranged and conducted by Oliver Nelson. It was Smith's first album for Verve Records. The first four tracks feature an ensemble that included future Tonight Show band members Doc Severinsen and Ed Shaughnessy.

== Track listing ==
1. "Walk on the Wild Side" (Elmer Bernstein, Mack David) – 5:55
2. "Ol' Man River" (Oscar Hammerstein II, Jerome Kern) – 3:56
3. "In a Mellow Tone" (Duke Ellington, Milt Gabler) – 4:25
4. "Step Right Up" (Oliver Nelson) – 4:13
5. "Beggar for the Blues" (Ray Rasch, Dotty Wayne) – 7:28
6. "Bashin'" (Jimmy Smith) – 6:16
7. "I'm an Old Cowhand (From the Rio Grande)" (Johnny Mercer) – 6:17

== Personnel ==
Musicians
Tracks 1–4

- Jimmy Smith – organ
- Oliver Nelson – arranger, conductor
- Phil Woods, Jerry Dodgion – alto saxophone
- Bob Ashton, Babe Clarke – tenor saxophone
- George Barrow – baritone saxophone
- Joe Newman, Ernie Royal, Doc Severinsen, Joe Wilder – trumpet
- Jimmy Cleveland, Urbie Green, Britt Woodman – trombone
- Tom Mitchell – bass trombone
- Barry Galbraith – guitar
- George Duvivier – bass
- Ed Shaughnessy – drums

Tracks 5–7

- Jimmy Smith – organ
- Quentin Warren – guitar
- Donald Bailey – drums

Production

- Creed Taylor – producer
- Rudy Van Gelder – engineer
- Del Shields – liner notes

== Chart performance ==
=== Single ===
Year	Single	Chart	Position
1962	"Walk on the Wild Side"	Billboard Hot 100	21
