= Donald Bailey (musician) =

American drummer

- Born: Donald Orlando Bailey, Sr. March 26, 1933; Philadelphia, Pennsylvania, U.S.
- Died: October 15, 2013 (aged 80) Montclair, California
- Genres: Jazz
- Occupation: Musician
- Instruments: Drums, Harmonica
- Labels: Blue Note; Talking House Records

Donald Orlando "Duck" Bailey (March 26, 1933 – October 15, 2013) was an American jazz drummer.

== Biography ==
Bailey was born in Philadelphia, Pennsylvania, on March 26, 1933. He was largely self-taught as a drummer.

Bailey got his big break in the jazz world and he is probably best known as the drummer in the trio of jazz organist Jimmy Smith from 1956 to 1964 and also for his work with The Three Sounds on Blue Note Records. While based in Los Angeles, Bailey also worked as a sideman for musicians including Sarah Vaughan, Carmen McRae, Hampton Hawes, Kenny Burrell, and Red Mitchell. In the mid-1970s, Bailey moved to Japan, where he lived for five years.

His album Blueprints of Jazz, Vol. 3 was recorded in 2006 and issued by Talking House Records in 2008. It features Charles Tolliver (trumpet), Odean Pope (tenor saxophone), George Burton (piano), and Tyrone Brown (bass). The album is part of the Blueprints of Jazz series conceived, produced and recorded by Talking House Productions with an aim to expose the histories and current work of important but often lesser-known jazz players who had contributed to the sounds of jazz legends from the 50’s, 60’s, and 70’s. Production and recording of the albums was helmed by Talking House producers Marc Weibel and Stephen Smith.

Bailey's playing also featured on the soundtracks of the films Buck and the Preacher and Twin Peaks: Fire Walk With Me.

Bailey performed around the San Francisco Bay Area until his late seventies and moved to Montclair, California, shortly before his death at age 80 in October 2013. He had suffered from asthma, seizures, and back problems.

== Discography ==
=== As leader or Co-Leader ===
- Trio (Capri, 1990, co-leader with Jimmy Rowles, Red Mitchell)
- Blueprints of Jazz, Vol. 3 (Talking House Records, 2008)

=== As backing musician ===
==== With Roy Ayers ====
- Virgo Vibes (Atlantic, 1967)

==== With George Braith ====
- Two Souls in One (Blue Note, 1963)

==== With Hampton Hawes ====
- Here and Now (Contemporary, 1965)
- The Seance (Contemporary, 1966 [1969])
- I'm All Smiles (Contemporary, 1966 [1973])

==== With Harold Land ====
- The Peace-Maker (Cadet, 1968)

==== With Thornel Schwartz ====
- Soul Cookin' (Argo, 1962) with Bill Leslie

==== With Jimmy Smith ====
- The Incredible Jimmy Smith at the Organ (Blue Note, 1956)
- At Club Baby Grand (Blue Note, 1956)
- The Sounds of Jimmy Smith (Blue Note, 1956)
- Plays Pretty Just for You (Blue Note, 1957)
- Jimmy Smith Trio + LD (Blue Note, 1957)
- Groovin' at Small's Paradise (Blue Note, 1957)
- House Party (Blue Note, 1957)
- The Sermon! (Blue Note, 1958)
- Softly as a Summer Breeze (Blue Note, 1958)
- Cool Blues (Blue Note, 1958)
- Six Views of the Blues (Blue Note, 1958)
- Home Cookin' (Blue Note, 1958–59)
- Crazy! Baby (Blue Note, 1960)
- Open House (Blue Note, 1960)
- Plain Talk (Blue Note, 1960)
- Straight Life (Blue Note, 1961)
- Midnight Special (Blue Note, 1961)
- Plays Fats Waller (Blue Note, 1962)
- Bashin': The Unpredictable Jimmy Smith (Verve Records, 1962)
- I'm Movin' On (Blue Note, 1963)
- Bucket! (Blue Note, 1963)
- Rockin' the Boat (Blue Note, 1963)
- Prayer Meetin' (Blue Note, 1963)
- Back at the Chicken Shack (Blue Note, 1963)

==== With Jimmy Rowles ====
- Subtle Legend (Storyville, recorded live 1972, released 1998)

==== With The Three Sounds ====
- Live at the Lighthouse (Blue Note, 1967)
- Coldwater Flat (Blue Note, 1968)

==== With Frank Wess and Johnny Coles ====
- Two at the Top (Uptown, 1988 [2012])

==== With Jack Wilson ====
- Song for My Daughter (Blue Note, 1969)

==== With Dave Frishberg ====
- Solo and Trio (Seeds, 1974)
