= Val Valentin =

- Birth name: Luis Pastor Valentin
- Born: January 6, 1920; Puerto Rico
- Died: March 24, 1999 (aged 79); Reno, Nevada, U.S.
- Occupation: engineer

Luis Pastor "Val" Valentin (January 6, 1920 – March 24, 1999) was an American recording engineer with six decades of work in the music industry. Much of his work was done for MGM Records and Verve Records. His large discography includes Jazz albums such as Ella and Louis, Night Train, and Getz/Gilberto.

== Career ==
Valentin's earliest known engineering credits date from around 1951, when he was credited on records released by MGM. He was the Director of Engineering for MGM and Verve Records beginning in 1963 in New York City and in 1970 was instrumental in moving the MGM recording studios from NYC to Los Angeles.

On the rear of the 1972 Mae West album, Great Balls of Fire, (MGM 215207), the words say: " Engineered by Jerry Styner. Vocal accompaniment by The Mike Curb Congregation. Mastered at MGM Recording Studios. Val Valentin in charge".

Valentin retained a low profile and little is publicly known about his life.
