= Reid Miles =

American photographer and graphic designer

Reid Miles (July 4, 1927 – February 2, 1993) was an American graphic designer and photographer best known for his work for Blue Note Records in the 1950s and 1960s.

== Biography ==
Miles was born in Chicago, Illinois, on July 4, 1927, but, following the Stock Market Crash and the separation of his parents, moved with his mother to Long Beach, California, in 1929.

After high school Miles joined the Navy and, following his discharge, moved to Los Angeles to enroll at Chouinard Art Institute.

After working in New York City in the early 1950s for John Hermansader and Esquire magazine and Margaret Hockaday's advertising firm, Miles was hired in his own right around 1956 by Francis Wolff of the jazz record label Blue Note to design album covers when the label began releasing their recordings on 12" LPs. During his eleven-year tenure as art director at Blue Note, Miles designed approximately 350 LP covers, (Note: Based on their catalogue numbering scheme, Blue Note Records prepared and/or issued 373 LPs during Reid Miles’ tenure (1956 to October 1967). The "1500" LP Series (1500-1599) produced 100 LPs; and the subsequent "80000" LP Series (84001-84273) produced 272 LPs. Therefore, allowing for a couple dozen LP covers that were prepared by other artists (primarily during the "1500" series) would yield approximately 350 covers."Blue Note Records Discography Project". Jazz Discography Project.) frequently incorporating the session photographs of Francis Wolff and, later, his own photographs, although many of his later designs dispensed entirely with photographs.

Miles wasn't particularly interested in jazz, saying he preferred classical music. He received several copies of each Blue Note album he designed, but gave most of them to friends or sold them to used record shops. Miles used the descriptions of the sessions relayed to him by producer Alfred Lion to create the artwork.

Lion's retirement as a record producer in 1967 coincided with the end of Miles' connection with Blue Note. "Fifty Bucks an album...they loved it, thought it was modern, they thought it went with the music...one or two colors to work with at that time and some outrageous graphics!"

As a photographer, Miles moved to Hollywood, California in 1971 and operated a studio under the name Reid Miles Inc.

He later directed television commercials, which garnered him a Clio Award in 1976.

== Select discography ==
=== Blue Note Records ===
- Bud! The Amazing Bud Powell (Vol. 3)
- Cool Struttin'
- Doin' the Thing
- Hustlin'
- Hub-Tones
- Midnight Blue
- A Night at Birdland Vol. 1
- The Scene Changes: The Amazing Bud Powell (Vol. 5)
- Serenade to a Soul Sister
- Milt Jackson and the Thelonious Monk Quintet
- The Sidewinder
- Out to Lunch!
- Empyrean Isles
- Our Man in Paris
- No Room for Squares
- Blue Train
- Go (Dexter Gordon album)
- A New Perspective
- In 'n Out
- Judgment!
- It's Time! (album)
- Into Somethin'
- The Sermon (Jimmy Smith album)
- Midnight Special (Jimmy Smith album)
- Good Move!
- Moanin'
- Speak No Evil
- Out of This World (The Three Sounds album)
- Midnight Creeper
- Joyride (Stanley Turrentine album)
- Trompeta Toccata
- Una Mas
- The Rumproller
- Stick-Up!
- Maiden Voyage (Herbie Hancock album)
- Dippin'
- Soul Station
- Quartet/Quintet/Sextet
- Gettin' Around
- Speakin' My Piece
- Hank Mobley (album)
- Night Dreamer
- Gravy Train (Lou Donaldson album)
- Takin' Off
- Speak Like a Child (album)
- Dialogue (Bobby Hutcherson album)
- Jutta Hipp with Zoot Sims
- Happy Frame of Mind
- Sonny Rollins, Volume 1
- Lee-Way
- Mode for Joe
- A Swingin' Affair
- Open Sesame (Freddie Hubbard album)
- Introducing Kenny Burrell
- Let Freedom Ring
- Blues Walk
- Free Form (Donald Byrd album)
- Basra

=== Others ===
- Chicago IX: Chicago's Greatest Hits
- The Basement Tapes
- Goin' Places
- The Gambler
- Underground (Thelonious Monk album)
- Cookin' with The Miles Davis Quintette

== See also ==
- Album covers of Blue Note Records
