= Francis Wolff =

American record producer

Francis Wolff (April 5, 1907 – March 8, 1971) was a record company executive, photographer and record producer. Wolff's skills, as an executive and a photographer, were important contributions to the success of the Blue Note record label.

== Career ==
Jakob Franz "Franny" Wolff was born in Berlin, Germany, where he became a jazz enthusiast, despite the government ban placed on this type of music after 1933. After a career as a commercial photographer in Germany, Wolff emigrated to the United States to flee persecution as a Jew. He left Berlin for New York in the late 1930s. In 1939 in New York his childhood friend Alfred Lion had co-founded Blue Note Records (with business partner Max Margulis, who soon dropped out of any involvement in the company), and Wolff joined Lion in running the company. During Lion's war service, Wolff worked for Milt Gabler at the Commodore Music Store, and together they maintained the company's catalogue until Lion was discharged.

Until Lion retired in 1967, Wolff concentrated on the financial affairs of the business and only supervised occasional recording sessions produced during his visits to Europe to see surviving members of his family. For the last four years of his life, when Blue Note was no longer an independent label, Wolff shared production responsibilities with pianist and arranger Duke Pearson. He died of a heart attack following surgery in New York City, aged 64.

Wolff took photographs during the recordings sessions, usually shot during session rehearsals, throughout the period of Lion's involvement in Blue Note Records. They were used on publicity material and the label's album covers, and have continued to be used in CD reissue booklets. The two collections of photographs listed below contain entirely separate selections of the many thousands Wolff shot over a thirty-year period.

Reid Miles and Alfred Lion chose to leave the label in 1967, while Francis Wolff remained until his death on March 8, 1971 from a heart attack. Francis Wolff is considered one of the leading jazz photographers. His work has long remained unknown to the public; the publication in 1995 of a book entitled The Blue Note Years: The Jazz Photography of Francis Wolff, a compilation of his principal photographs for the label, helped to make his work more widely known.

== Documentary films ==
- Julian Benedikt: Blue Note – A Story of Modern Jazz. Documentary film, Germany, 1996.
- Eric Friedler (film director): It Must Schwing! The Blue Note Story. Documentary film, Produzent: Wim Wenders, Germany, 2018.
- Sophie Huber: Blue Note Records: Beyond the Notes. Documentary film, Switzerland, 2018.

== Bibliography ==
- Michael Cuscuna, Charlie Lourie & Oscar Schnider (1995), The Blue Note Years: The Jazz Photography of Francis Wolff, Rizzoli, ISBN 0-8478-1912-4
- Michael Cuscuna, Charlie Lourie & Oscar Schnider (2000), Blue Note: The Jazz Photography of Francis Wolff, Universe (Rizzoli), ISBN 0-7893-0493-7
