= Jimmy Smith (musician) =

American jazz organist (1928–2005)

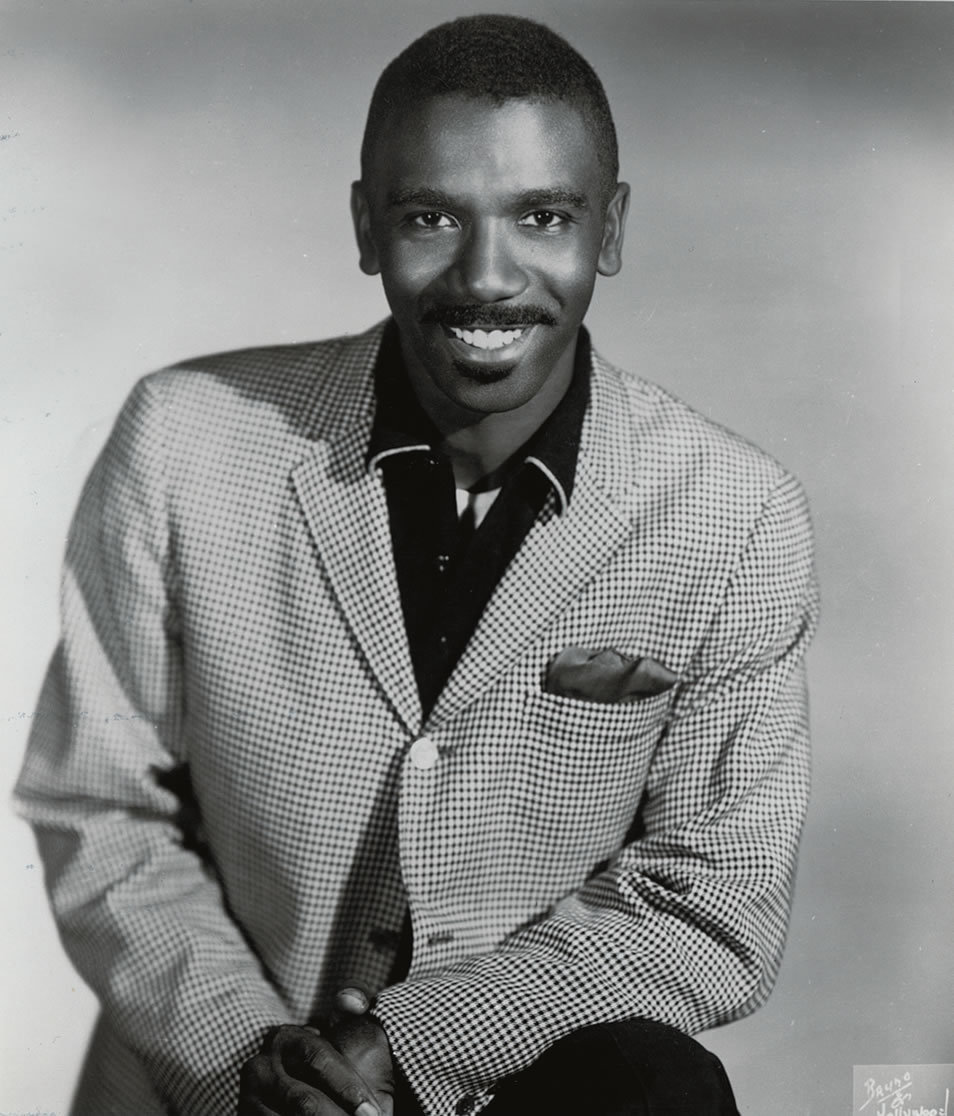
- Smith in 1958

Background information
- Born: James Oscar Smith; December 8, 1928; Norristown, Pennsylvania, U.S.
- Died: February 8, 2005 (aged 76) Scottsdale, Arizona, U.S.
- Genres: Hard bop; soul jazz; jazz-funk
- Occupation: Musician
- Instrument: Hammond organ
- Works: Jimmy Smith discography
- Years active: 1948–2005
- Labels: Blue Note; Verve; Milestone; Elektra; His Master's Voice

James Oscar Smith (December 8, 1928 – February 8, 2005) was an American jazz musician who helped popularize the Hammond B-3 organ, creating a link between jazz and 1960s soul music.

In 2005, Smith was awarded the NEA Jazz Masters Award from the National Endowment for the Arts, the highest honor that America bestows upon jazz musicians.

== Early years ==
James Oscar Smith was born in Norristown, Pennsylvania, northwest of Philadelphia. He joined his father doing a song-and-dance routine in clubs at the age of six. He began teaching himself to play the piano. When he was nine, Smith won a Philadelphia radio talent contest as a boogie-woogie pianist. After a period in the U.S. Navy, he began furthering his musical education in 1948, with a year at Royal Hamilton College of Music, then the Leo Ornstein School of Music in Philadelphia in 1949. He began exploring the Hammond organ in 1951. From 1951 to 1954, he played piano, then organ in Philly R&B bands like Don Gardner and the Sonotones. He switched to organ permanently in 1954 after hearing Wild Bill Davis play.

== Career ==
Smith purchased his first Hammond organ, rented a warehouse to practice in, and emerged after little more than a year. Upon hearing him playing in a Philadelphia club, Blue Note's Alfred Lion immediately signed Smith to the label. His second album, The Champ, quickly established Smith as a new star on the jazz scene. He was a prolific recording artist and, as a leader, dubbed The Incredible Jimmy Smith, recorded around 40 sessions for Blue Note in just eight years beginning in 1956. Albums from this period include The Sermon!, House Party, Home Cooking', Midnight Special, Back at the Chicken Shack and Prayer Meetin'.

Smith signed to the Verve label in 1962. His first album, Bashin', sold well and for the first time Smith worked with a big band, led by Oliver Nelson. Further big band collaborations followed with composer/arranger Lalo Schifrin for The Cat and guitarist Wes Montgomery, with whom he recorded two albums: The Dynamic Duo and Further Adventures of Jimmy and Wes. Other albums from this period include Blue Bash! and Organ Grinder Swing with Kenny Burrell, The Boss with George Benson, Who's Afraid of Virginia Woolf?, Got My Mojo Working, and Hoochie Coochie Man.

During the 1950s and 1960s, Smith almost always performed live, in a trio, consisting of organ, guitar and drums. The Jimmy Smith Trio performed "When Johnny Comes Marching Home" and "The Sermon" in the film Get Yourself a College Girl (1964).

In the 1970s, Smith opened his own supper club in the North Hollywood neighborhood of Los Angeles, California, at 12910 Victory Boulevard and played there regularly with Kenny Dixon on drums, Herman Riley and John F. Phillips on saxophone; also included in the band was harmonica/flute player Stanley Behrens. The 1972 album Root Down, considered a seminal influence on later generations of funk and hip-hop musicians, was recorded live at the club, albeit with a different group of backing musicians.

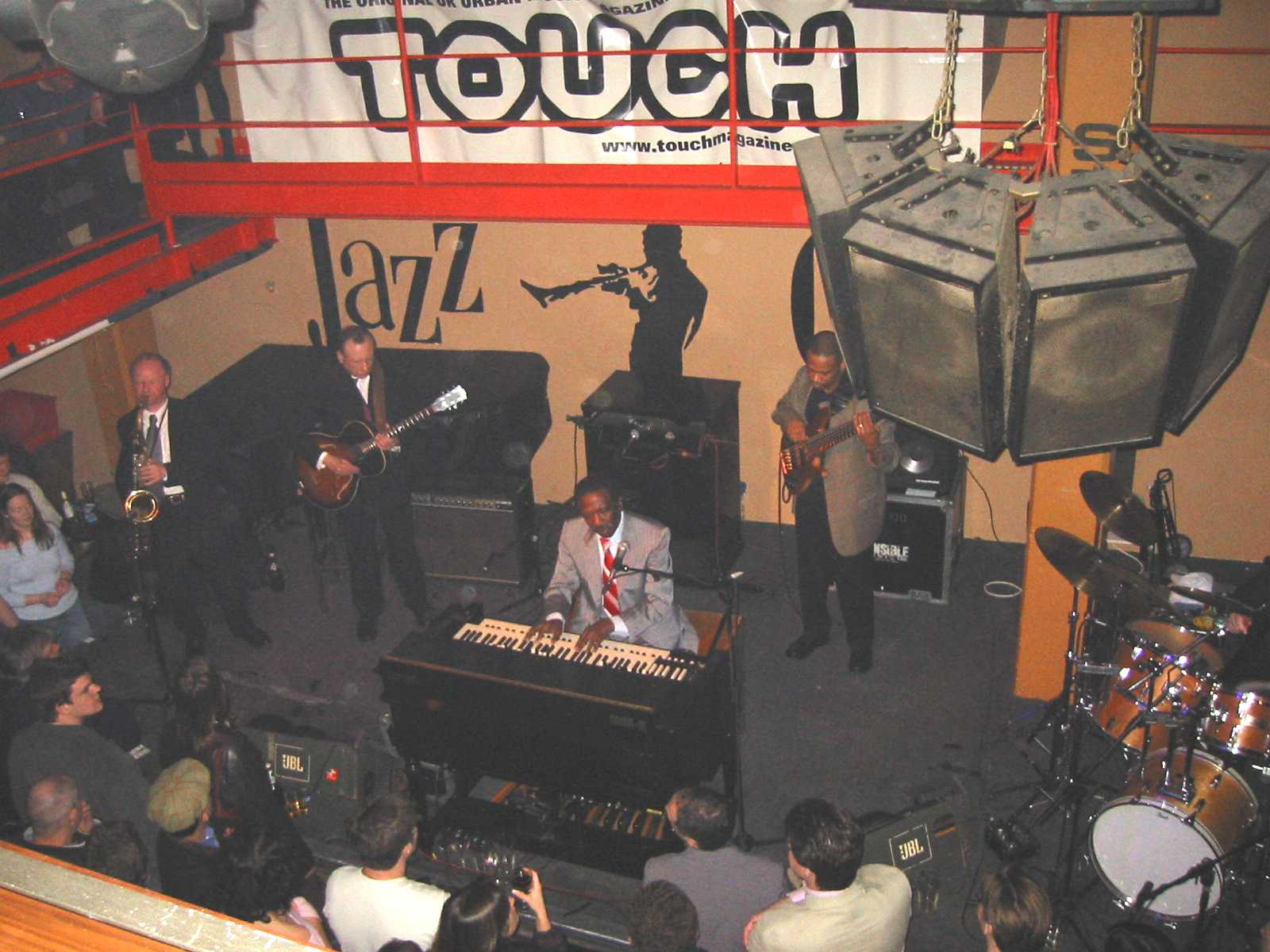
Smith at the London Jazz Cafe Mar 2004 (final UK gig)

== Later career ==
Holle Thee Maxwell, then known as Holly Maxwell, was Smith's vocalist for two years in the late 1970s. During a South African tour, they recorded the album Jimmy Smith Plays for the People in 1978.

Smith had a career revival in the 1980s and 1990s, again recording for Blue Note and Verve, and for Elektra and Milestone. He also recorded with Quincy Jones, Frank Sinatra, Michael Jackson (he can be heard on the title track of the Bad album), Dee Dee Bridgewater, and Joey DeFrancesco. His last album, Dot Com Blues (Blue Thumb/Verve, 2000), was recorded with B. B. King, Dr. John, and Etta James.

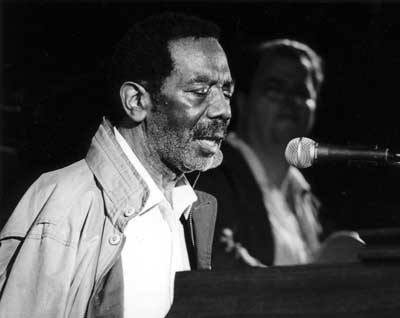
Smith at the Liri Blues Festival in 2004

Smith and his wife moved to Scottsdale, Arizona in 2004. She died of cancer a few months later. Smith recorded Legacy with Joey DeFrancesco, and the two prepared to go on tour. However, before the tour began, Smith died on February 8, 2005, at his Scottsdale home, where he was found by his manager, Robert Clayton. He died in his sleep of natural causes.

== Musical style ==
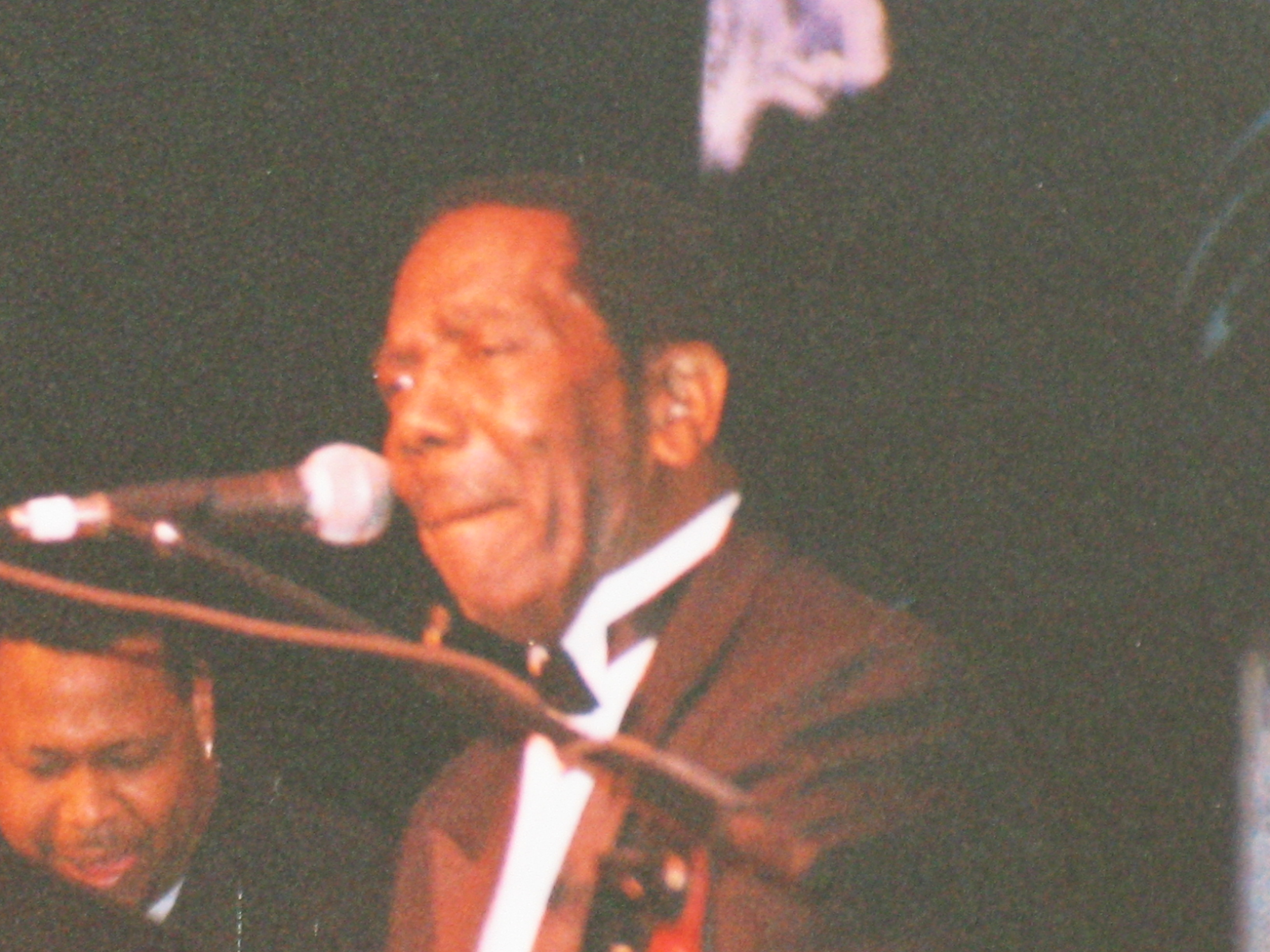
Smith in 2005

While the electric organ had been used in jazz by Fats Waller, Count Basie, Wild Bill Davis and others, Smith's virtuoso improvisation technique on the Hammond helped to popularize the electric organ as a jazz and blues instrument. The B-3 and companion Leslie speaker produce a distinctive sound. The drawbar setting most commonly associated with Smith is to pull out the first three drawbars on the "B" preset on the top manual of the organ, with added harmonic percussion on the 3rd harmonic. The tone has been emulated by many jazz organists since Smith. Smith's style on fast tempo pieces combined bluesy "licks" with bebop-based single note runs. For ballads, he played walking bass lines on the bass pedals. For uptempo tunes, he played the bass line on the lower manual and use the pedals for emphasis on the attack of certain notes, which helped to emulate the attack and sound of a string bass.

Smith influenced a constellation of jazz organists including Jimmy McGriff, Brother Jack McDuff, Don Patterson, Richard "Groove" Holmes, Joey DeFrancesco, Tony Monaco and Larry Goldings as well as rock keyboardists such as Jon Lord, Brian Auger and Keith Emerson. Emerson would later recount a story where Smith grabbed Emerson's "meat and two veg" as a humorous greeting. Later, Smith influenced bands such as Medeski, Martin & Wood and the Beastie Boys, who sampled the bassline from "Root Down (and Get It)" from Root Down—and saluted Smith in the lyrics—for their own hit "Root Down". Often called the father of acid jazz, Smith lived to see that movement come to reflect his organ style. In the 1990s, Smith went to Nashville, taking a break from his ongoing gigs at his Sacramento restaurant, which he owned, and in Music City, Nashville, with the help of a webmaster he produced Dot Com Blues, his last Verve album. In 1999, Smith guested on two tracks of a live album, Incredible! (Smith's nickname during the 1960s) with his protégé, Joey DeFrancesco, a then 28-year-old organist. Smith and DeFrancesco's collaborative album Legacy was released in 2005 shortly after Smith's death.
