= Cornbread (album) =

Studio album by Lee Morgan
- Released: End of January 1967
- Recorded: September 18, 1965
- Studio: Van Gelder Studio, Englewood Cliffs, New Jersey
- Genre: Soul jazz, hard bop
- Length: 39:08
- Label: Blue Note; BST 84222
- Producer: Alfred Lion

Lee Morgan chronology
The Gigolo (1965)	Cornbread (1967)	Infinity (1965)

Professional ratings
Review scores
Source	Rating
AllMusic	5/5 stars
The Penguin Guide to Jazz	3/4 stars
The Rolling Stone Jazz Record Guide	5/5 stars
DownBeat	3.5/5 stars

Cornbread is an album by American jazz trumpeter Lee Morgan. Recorded in September 1965 but released on the Blue Note label in early 1967, the album features performances by Morgan, along with sidemen Herbie Hancock, Billy Higgins, Jackie McLean, Hank Mobley, and Larry Ridley.

Though somewhat overshadowed by the commercial success of Morgan's previous album, The Sidewinder, and the artistic ambition of Search For The New Land, Cornbread is nevertheless noted as an example of Morgan's graduation to 'formidable' jazz composer status, as well as confirming his reputation as an exemplary trumpet player. The track 'Ceora' has become widely considered a jazz standard.

== Track listing ==
All compositions by Lee Morgan, except where noted.

1. "Cornbread" – 9:03
2. "Our Man Higgins" – 8:54
3. "Ceora" – 6:23
4. "Ill Wind" (Harold Arlen, Ted Koehler) – 7:59
5. "Most Like Lee" – 6:49

== Personnel ==
- Lee Morgan – trumpet, leader
- Jackie McLean – alto saxophone
- Hank Mobley – tenor saxophone
- Herbie Hancock – piano
- Larry Ridley – bass
- Billy Higgins – drums

== Charts ==
Chart (1967)	Peak position
U.S. Billboard Jazz Albums	7
Chart (1988)	Peak position
U.S. Billboard Top Jazz Albums	15
