= Tom Cat (album) =

- 2006 Edition

Studio album by Lee Morgan
- Released: 1980
- Recorded: August 11, 1964
- Studio: Van Gelder Studio, Englewood Cliffs, NJ
- Genre: Jazz
- Length: 41:24
- Label: Blue Note; LT 1058
- Producer: Alfred Lion

Lee Morgan chronology
| Search for the New Land (1964) | Tom Cat (1964) | The Rumproller (1965) |

Alternative cover
- 1990 U.S. Blue Note CD Edition

Alternative cover
- 2008 RVG Edition

Professional ratings
Review scores
| Source | Rating |
|---|---|
| Allmusic | 4/5 stars |
| The Penguin Guide to Jazz | 2.5/4 stars |
| The Rolling Stone Jazz Record Guide | 4/5 stars |

Tom Cat is an album by Lee Morgan recorded in 1964, though only issued in 1980. It was originally released as LT 1058. While lesser known in comparison to The Sidewinder and other albums, it features several of Morgan's contemporary Blue Note recording artists, such as McCoy Tyner, Art Blakey, and Jackie McLean. After The Sidewinder's commercial success, Tom Cat and Search for the New Land from earlier in 1964 were both shelved. Instead, Alfred Lion, Blue Note's producer, encouraged Morgan to record a new funky theme (now dubbed "the Sidewinder lineage") and brought him back into the studio to record The Rumproller. Search for the New Land was released in 1966, but Tom Cat remained unreleased until 1980.

== Track listing ==
All compositions by Lee Morgan except where noted

1. "Tom Cat" – 9:50
2. "Exotique" – 9:34
3. "Twice Around" – 7:36
4. "Twilight Mist" (McCoy Tyner) – 6:57
5. "Rigormortis" – 7:27

== Personnel ==
- Lee Morgan – trumpet
- Curtis Fuller – trombone
- Jackie McLean – alto saxophone
- McCoy Tyner – piano
- Bob Cranshaw – bass
- Art Blakey – drums
