= A New Sound... A New Star..., Vol. 1 =

Studio album by Jimmy Smith at the Organ
- Released: 1956
- Recorded: February 18, 1956
- Studio: Van Gelder Studio; Hackensack, New Jersey
- Genre: Jazz
- Length: 40:04
- Label: Blue Note; BLP 1512
- Producer: Alfred Lion

Jimmy Smith chronology
A New Sound... A New Star..., Vol. 1 (1956)	A New Sound – A New Star, Vol. 2 (1956)

Singles from A New Sound... A New Star..., Vol. 1
- 1. "Midnight Sun" Released: 1957

A New Sound... A New Star..., Vol. 1 is the debut album by the American jazz organist Jimmy Smith, recorded on February 18, 1956 and released on Blue Note later that year.

== Background ==
The album was rereleased on CD combined with Smith's following two LPs, A New Sound – A New Star, Vol. 2 (1956) and Jimmy Smith at the Organ (1956).

== Reception ==
Professional ratings
Review scores
Source	Rating
AllMusic	4.5/5 stars
The Penguin Guide to Jazz Recordings	(CD reissue)

The AllMusic review by Scott Yanow states, "The debut of organist Jimmy Smith on records (he was already 30) was a major event, for he introduced a completely new and very influential style on the organ, one that virtually changed the way the instrument is played."

== Track listing ==
=== Side 1 ===
1. "The Way You Look Tonight" (Dorothy Fields, Jerome Kern) – 5:04
2. "You Get 'Cha" – 4:23 (Jimmy Smith)
3. "Midnight Sun" (Sonny Burke, Lionel Hampton, Johnny Mercer) – 4:26
4. "Oh, Lady Be Good!" (George Gershwin, Ira Gershwin) – 5:49

=== Side 2 ===
1. "The High and the Mighty" (Dimitri Tiomkin, Ned Washington) – 4:21
2. "But Not for Me" (Gershwin, Gershwin) – 4:30
3. "The Preacher" (Horace Silver) – 4:35
4. "Tenderly" (Walter Gross, Jack Lawrence) – 3:56
5. "Joy" (Johann Sebastian Bach) – 3:13

== Personnel ==
=== Musicians ===
- Jimmy Smith – Hammond organ
- Thornel Schwartz – guitar
- Bay Perry – drums

=== Technical personnel ===
- Alfred Lion – producer
- Rudy Van Gelder – recording engineer
- Reid Miles – design
- Francis Wolff – photography
- Babs Gonzales – liner notes
