= A New Sound – A New Star, Vol. 2 =

Studio album by Jimmy Smith at the Organ
- Released: 1956
- Recorded: March 27, 1956
- Studios: Van Gelder Studio; Hackensack, New Jersey
- Genre: Jazz
- Length: 40:29
- Labels: Blue Note; BLP 1514
- Producer: Alfred Lion

Jimmy Smith chronology
A New Sound... A New Star..., Vol. 1 (1956)	A New Sound – A New Star, Vol. 2 (1956)	The Incredible Jimmy Smith at the Organ (1956)

A New Sound – A New Star, Vol. 2, also released as The Champ, is an album by American jazz organist Jimmy Smith recorded at Van Gelder Studio on March 27, 1956 and released on Blue Note later that year.

== Release history ==
The album was rerelased on CD combined with Smith's first LP, A New Sound... A New Star..., Vol. 1, and the following Jimmy Smith at the Organ.

== Reception ==
Professional ratings
Review scores
Source	Rating
AllMusic	4.5/5 stars
The Penguin Guide to Jazz Recordings	(CD reissue)

The AllMusic review awarded the album 4½ stars.

The All About Jazz reviewer commented that it was more bebop-based than the first volume.

== Track listing ==
All compositions by Jimmy Smith, except as noted.

=== Side 1 ===
1. "The Champ" (Dizzy Gillespie) – 8:36
2. "Bayou" – 4:52
3. "Deep Purple" (Peter DeRose, Mitchell Parish) – 7:14

=== Side 2 ===
1. "Moonlight in Vermont" (John Blackburn, Karl Suessdorf) – 4:32
2. "Ready 'n Able" – 6:31
3. "Turquoise" – 4:12
4. "Bubbis" – 4:32

== Personnel ==
=== Musicians ===
- Jimmy Smith – organ
- Thornel Schwartz – guitar
- Donald Bailey – drums

=== Technical personnel ===
- Alfred Lion – producer
- Rudy Van Gelder – recording engineer
- Reid Miles – design
- Francis Wolff – photography
- Babs Gonzales – liner notes
