= Infinity (Lee Morgan album) =

Studio album by Lee Morgan
- Released: 1981
- Recorded: November 16, 1965
- Studio: Van Gelder Studio, Englewood Cliffs, NJ
- Genre: Jazz
- Length: 41:21
- Label: Blue Note; LT 1091
- Producer: Alfred Lion

Lee Morgan chronology
Cornbread (1965)	Infinity (1981)	Delightfulee (1966)

Alternative cover
- 1998 CD reissue

Infinity is an album by jazz trumpeter Lee Morgan, released on the Blue Note label. It was recorded on November 16, 1965 but not released until 1981 and features performances by Morgan with a quintet featuring Jackie McLean, Larry Willis, Reggie Workman and Billy Higgins. The album was reissued on CD in 1998 as a limited edition.

== Reception ==
The AllMusic review by Scott Yanow stated: "The music (four Morgan and one McLean originals), even while being tied to the hard bop tradition, is challenging and (with the exception of the closing uptempo blues 'Zip Code') quite tricky; really inspiring the talented players. An underrated gem."

Professional ratings
Review scores
Source	Rating
AllMusic	4/5 stars
The Penguin Guide to Jazz	2.5/4 stars
The Rolling Stone Jazz Record Guide	4/5 stars

== Track listing ==
All compositions by Lee Morgan except where noted

1. "Infinity" - 11:42
2. "Miss Nettie B." - 9:20
3. "Growing Pains" - 8:06
4. "Portrait of Doll" (McLean) - 5:42
5. "Zip Code" - 6:31

== Personnel ==
- Lee Morgan - trumpet
- Jackie McLean - alto saxophone
- Larry Willis - piano
- Reggie Workman - bass
- Billy Higgins - drums
