= Thornel Schwartz =

American jazz musician

Thornel Schwartz Jr., or Thornal Schwartz Jr. (May 29, 1927 in Philadelphia – December 30, 1977 in Philadelphia) was an American jazz guitarist. He played electric guitar on the recordings of many Philadelphia jazz musicians, especially electronic organ players.

Schwartz is known as Thornel on recording titles and in standard jazz reference works, but Gary W. Kennedy of The New Grove Dictionary of Jazz notes that Schwartz spelled his own and his father's name "Thornal" on his social security application. Schwartz attended the Landis Institute for piano, but became known as a jazz guitarist starting in the 1950s. He was Freddie Cole's guitarist early in the decade, then worked with Jimmy Smith and Johnny Hammond Smith later in the decade. In the 1960s he recorded with Larry Young (musician), Jimmy Forrest, Charles Earland, Byrdie Green, Sylvia Syms and extensively with Jimmy McGriff, and in the 1970s with Groove Holmes.

== Discography ==
=== As leader ===
- Soul Cookin' (Argo, 1962) -with Bill Leslie

=== As sideman ===
With Jimmy McGriff

- Christmastime (Jell, 1965)
- Where the Action's At! (Veep/United Records, 1966)
- The Big Band (Solid State, 1966) - also released as A Tribute to Basie
- A Bag Full of Soul (Solid State, 1966)
- I've Got a New Woman (Solid State, 1967)
- The Worm (Solid State, 1968)
- Let's Stay Together (Groove Merchant, 1972)

With Jimmy Smith

- A New Sound... A New Star... (Blue Note, 1956)
- A New Sound A New Star: Jimmy Smith at the Organ Volume 2 [AKA The Champ] (Blue Note, 1956)
- The Incredible Jimmy Smith at the Organ Volume 3 (Blue Note, 1956)
- At Club Baby Grand (Blue Note, 1956)
- Respect (Verve, 1967)

With Johnny "Hammond" Smith

- All Soul (New Jazz, 1959)
- That Good Feelin' (New Jazz, 1959)
- Gettin' Up [also released as Ebb Tide] (Prestige, 1967)

With Larry Young

- Testifying (Prestige, 1960)
- Young Blues (Prestige, 1960)
- Groove Street (Prestige, 1962)

With others

- Milt Buckner, Rockin' Again (Black & Blue, 1981)
- Jimmy Forrest, Forrest Fire (New Jazz, 1960)
- Byrdie Green, I Got It Bad (And That Ain't Good) (Prestige, 1967)
- Richard "Groove" Holmes, X–77: Richard "Groove" Holmes Recorded Live at the Lighthouse (World Pacific, 1969)
- Bill Leslie, Diggin' the Chicks (Argo, 1962)
- Sylvia Syms, For Once in My Life (Prestige, 1967)
- Big Joe Turner, Singing the Blues (BluesWay, 1967)
- The Wildare Express (w/Reuben Wilson), Walk On By (Brunswick, 1967–1968 [rel. 1970])
