= Live at the Lighthouse (Lee Morgan album) =

Live album by Lee Morgan
- Released: April 1971
- Recorded: July 10–12, 1970
- Venue: Lighthouse Café, Hermosa Beach, California
- Genre: Jazz
- Length: 73:08 (original album release); 183:47 (CD and digital version)
- Label: Blue Note
- Producer: Francis Wolff

Lee Morgan chronology
Caramba! (1968)	Live at the Lighthouse (1971)	The Last Session (1972)

Live at the Lighthouse is a live album by jazz trumpeter Lee Morgan, released on the Blue Note label in 1971. The album features a quintet of Morgan, Bennie Maupin, Harold Mabern, Jymie Merritt, and Mickey Roker, recorded at The Lighthouse in Hermosa Beach, California in July 1970. (Jack DeJohnette replaces Roker on drums on "Speedball".) Originally released as a double LP comprising four side-long recordings, the 1996 CD reissue expanded the track list with over one-hundred minutes of additional material from the Lighthouse gigs. In 2021, Blue Note released an 8-CD/12-LP box set featuring the complete recordings of Morgan's three-night stint to commemorate the original album's fiftieth anniversary.

Recording of the album began on Morgan's 32nd birthday (July 10, 1970). This would be the final album and only live recording released by Morgan during his lifetime; his final album, the studio recording The Last Session, was released in May 1972, after his death in February that year.

== Reception ==
The AllMusic review by Scott Yanow awarded the album 4.5 stars, stating: "Stimulating and frequently exciting music from late in Lee Morgan's short life."

Professional ratings
Review scores
Source	Rating
AllMusic	4.5/5 stars
The Penguin Guide to Jazz	4/4 stars
The Rolling Stone Jazz Record Guide	4/5 stars

== Track listings ==
The original 1971 2-LP release consisted of four sides, one track per side:

1. "Absolutions" (Jymie Merritt) – 19:40
2. "The Beehive" (Harold Mabern) – 16:23
3. "Neophilia" (Bennie Maupin) – 19:05
4. "Nommo" (Jymie Merritt) – 18:00

The 1996 3-CD box-set release included 13 bonus tracks, which are also all available as part of the current download package:

1. Introduction by Lee Morgan – 2:00
2. "The Beehive" (Harold Mabern) – 15:17
3. "Absolutions" (Jymie Merritt) – 22:43
4. "Peyote" (Bennie Maupin) – 11:23
5. "Speedball" (Lee Morgan) – 11:54
6. "Nommo" (Jymie Merritt) – 17:50
7. "Neophilia" (Bennie Maupin) – 18:59
8. "Something Like This" (Bennie Maupin) – 13:01
9. "I Remember Britt" (Harold Mabern) – 14:55
10. "Aon" (Harold Mabern) – 13:47
11. "Yunjana" (Bennie Maupin) – 16:07
12. "416 East 10th Street" (Bennie Maupin) – 12:11
13. "The Sidewinder" (Lee Morgan) – 13:40

A 12-LP/8-CD box-set of the entire engagement over the three evenings was released in August 2021.

== Personnel ==
- Lee Morgan – trumpet, flugelhorn
- Bennie Maupin – tenor saxophone, flute, bass clarinet
- Harold Mabern – piano
- Jymie Merritt – electric upright bass
- Mickey Roker – drums (except on track 5)
- Jack DeJohnette – drums (track 5 only)
