= Into Somethin' =

Studio album by Larry Young
- Released: March 1965
- Recorded: November 12, 1964
- Studio: Van Gelder Studio, Englewood Cliffs, NJ
- Genre: Jazz
- Length: 41:26 CD reissue
- Label: Blue Note; BST 84187
- Producer: Alfred Lion

Larry Young chronology
Groove Street (1962)	Into Somethin' (1965)	Unity (1966)

Professional ratings
Review scores
Source	Rating
Allmusic	4.5/5 stars
Down Beat	4/5 stars
The Penguin Guide to Jazz Recordings	3.5/4 stars

Into Somethin' is a 1965 album by jazz organist Larry Young, which is also his debut for Blue Note records. It features a quartet of Young, tenor saxophonist Sam Rivers, guitarist Grant Green and drummer Elvin Jones. Young had previously recorded with Green and Jones (under Green's name).

== Track listing ==
All compositions by Larry Young except as indicated

1. "Tyrone" - 9:40
2. "Plaza De Toros" (Green) - 9:39
3. "Paris Eyes" - 6:42
4. "Backup" - 8:40
5. "Ritha" - 6:45

On the 1998 "Connoisseur Series" CD reissue, an alternative version of "Ritha" is included in addition to the original featured on the vinyl issue.

== Personnel ==
- Larry Young - organ
- Sam Rivers - tenor saxophone (#1–4)
- Grant Green - guitar
- Elvin Jones - drums
