= Of Love and Peace =

Studio album by Larry Young
- Released: September 1967
- Recorded: July 28, 1966
- Studio: Van Gelder Studio, Englewood Cliffs, New Jersey
- Genre: Post-bop, avant-garde jazz
- Length: 41:08
- Label: Blue Note
- Producer: Alfred Lion

Larry Young chronology
Unity (1965)	Of Love and Peace (1967)	Contrasts (1967)

Of Love and Peace is an album by organist Larry Young. It was recorded in 1966 and was released by Blue Note Records in 1967.

== Recording and music ==
The album was recorded at Van Gelder Studio, Englewood Cliffs, New Jersey, on July 28, 1966. "Of Love and Peace" and "Falaq" are largely free improvisations. The other tracks are cover versions of "Pavanne" and "Seven Steps to Heaven".

== Releases and reception ==
Professional ratings
Review scores
Source	Rating
AllMusic	4/5 stars
DownBeat	3/5 stars
The Penguin Guide to Jazz	3.5/4 stars

Of Love and Peace was released by Blue Note Records. On CD, it was later issued as part of Mosaic Records's box set of Young recordings, then by Blue Note in 2004. The Penguin Guide to Jazz described it as "a fine effort which takes a mostly obscure band through some fascinating ideas". The AllMusic reviewer called it a "stimulating Blue Note date".

== Track listing ==
1. "Pavanne" (Morton Gould) - 14:11
2. "Of Love and Peace" (Young) - 6:31
3. "Seven Steps to Heaven" (Miles Davis/Victor Feldman) - 10:17
4. "Falaq" (Young) - 10:09

== Personnel ==
- Larry Young – organ
- Eddie Gale – trumpet
- James Spaulding – alto saxophone (1, 3, 4), flute (2)
- Herbert Morgan – tenor saxophone
- Wilson Moorman III – drums
- Jerry Thomas – drums
