= At Club "Baby Grand" Wilmington, Delaware =

Live album by the Incredible Jimmy Smith
- Released: 1956
- Recorded: August 4, 1956
- Venue: Club Baby Grand; Wilmington, DE
- Genre: Jazz
- Length: 41:26 (Vol. 1); 40:24 (Vol. 2)
- Label: Blue Note; BLP 1528 (Vol. 1); BLP 1529 (Vol. 2)
- Producer: Alfred Lion

Jimmy Smith chronology
The Incredible Jimmy Smith at the Organ (1956)	At Club "Baby Grand" Wilmington, Delaware (1956)	A Date with Jimmy Smith Volume One (1957)

Singles from At Club "Baby Grand"
- 1. "The New Preacher, Part 1" Released: 1957

At Club "Baby Grand" Wilmington, Delaware, Vols. 1 & 2 are a pair of separate but related live albums by American jazz organist Jimmy Smith recorded at Club "Baby Grand" in Wilmington, Delaware on August 4, 1956 and released on Blue Note later that year.

== Reception ==
Professional ratings
Review scores
Source	Rating
AllMusic	3/5 stars
The Penguin Guide to Jazz	3/4 stars

The AllMusic review by Steve Leggett states, "It's all Jimmy Smith in full flight, bubbling over with cascading notes and breathless detours, and if his studio work is generally more structured and considered (but only a little more so), this set shows him in what was his natural habitat, astounding an audience in a small club. Bailey keeps up with things and Schwartz gets a word in now and then, but this is Smith's show all the way."

== Track listing ==
=== At Club "Baby Grand" Wilmington, Delaware, Vol. 1 ===
Side 1
No.	Title	Writer(s)	Length
1.	"Introduction by Mitch Thomas"		0:59
2.	"Sweet Georgia Brown"	Bernie, Casey, Pinkard	9:33
3.	"Where or When"	Hart, Rodgers	9:17

Side 2
No.	Title	Writer(s)	Length
1.	"The Preacher"	Silver	11:55
2.	"Rosetta"	Hines, Woode	10:08

=== At Club "Baby Grand" Wilmington, Delaware, Vol. 2 ===
Side 1
No.	Title	Writer(s)	Length
1.	"Caravan"	Ellington, Mills, Tizol	10:18
2.	"Love Is a Many-Splendored Thing"	Fain, Webster	10:46

Side 2
No.	Title	Writer(s)	Length
1.	"Get Happy"	Arlen, Koehler	7:27
2.	"It's All Right with Me"	Porter	11:53

== Personnel ==
=== Musicians ===
- Jimmy Smith – organ
- Thornel Schwartz – guitar
- Donald Bailey – drums

=== Technical personnel ===
- Alfred Lion – producer
- Rudy Van Gelder – recording engineer
- Reid Miles – design
- Francis Wolff – photography
- Leonard Feather – liner notes
