= The Preacher (Horace Silver song) =

Composition by Horace Silver

from the album Horace Silver Quintet, Vol. 2
- Language: English
- Recorded: February 6, 1955
- Genre: Jazz; hard bop
- Label: Blue Note
- Composer: Horace Silver
- Producer: Alfred Lion

"The Preacher" is a composition by jazz pianist Horace Silver. The original version was recorded by Silver's quintet on February 6, 1955. It was soon covered by other musicians, including with lyrics added by Babs Gonzales. It has become a jazz standard.

== Composition ==
"The Preacher" is based on the chords of "Show Me the Way to Go Home", which Silver often used to end his concerts. He wrote it in the Arlington Hotel on Twenty-Fifth Street in New York City, where he lived for four years from 1954.

== Original recording ==
The original version featured Silver on piano, with Hank Mobley (tenor saxophone), Kenny Dorham (trumpet), Doug Watkins (bass), and Art Blakey (drums). "Fired by the song's rocking beat, Dorham and Mobley soar into blues-drenched, vocally inflected solos. Silver follows with a typically stripped-down statement, built around first a two-chord percussive figure and then a descending run, each repeated. Before taking the tune out, the band riffs behind his funky noodling in classic call-and-response fashion." "The gospel influence of 'The Preacher' was achieved subtly [...] with a melody and associated riffs which had a natural, built-in back-beat."

It was almost rejected by producer Alfred Lion, who thought it was "too old-timey", but it was retained at the insistence of Blakey and Silver, who threatened to cancel the session until Silver had written another tune to record in its place if it was not included.

"The Preacher" was released as a single along with "Doodlin'"; the pairing "might be the first example of a jazz hit single going on to boost sales of its source album – or, as here, albums". It was Silver's first hit. The track helped trigger interest in hard bop among other musicians.

== Later versions ==
The song was soon covered by other musicians, including organist Jimmy Smith (on At Club Baby Grand, Volume 1, 1956) and trombonist Kai Winding (on Trombone Panorama, 1956). Babs Gonzales added lyrics for his version. As of 2014, more than 220 versions of the song have been recorded.
