= Heaven on Earth (Larry Young album) =

Studio album by Larry Young
- Released: April 1969
- Recorded: February 9, 1968
- Genre: Jazz
- Length: 37:50
- Label: Blue Note
- Producer: Francis Wolff

Larry Young chronology
Contrasts (1967)	Heaven on Earth (1969)	Mother Ship (1969)

Heaven on Earth is an album by American organist Larry Young recorded in 1968 and released on the Blue Note label.

== Reception ==
The AllMusic review by Scott Yanow awarded the album 3 stars and stated "Organist Larry Young, who really found his own sound back in 1965 with the classic Unity album, is deep in the funk on this later Blue Note album... there are some explorative solos but the less imaginative funk rhythms lower the content of the music somewhat".

Professional ratings
Review scores
Source	Rating
AllMusic	3/5 stars
DownBeat	2/5 stars

== Track listing ==
All compositions by Larry Young except as indicated

1. "The Infant" – 6:00
2. "The Cradle" – 5:00
3. "The Hereafter" – 8:41
4. "Heaven on Earth" – 6:05
5. "Call Me" (Tony Hatch) – 7:26
6. "My Funny Valentine" (Lorenz Hart, Richard Rodgers) – 4:38

- Recorded at Rudy Van Gelder Studio, Englewood Cliffs, New Jersey on February 9, 1968

== Personnel ==
- Larry Young – organ
- Byard Lancaster – alto saxophone, flute (tracks 1 & 3–6)
- Herbert Morgan – tenor saxophone (tracks 1 & 3–5)
- George Benson – guitar (tracks 1 & 3–6)
- Eddie Gladden – drums
- Althea Young – vocals (track 6)
