= Jimmy Smith at the Organ (1956 album) =

Studio album by the Incredible Jimmy Smith
- Released: 1956
- Recorded: June 17–18, 1956
- Studio: Van Gelder Studio; Hackensack, New Jersey
- Genre: Jazz
- Length: 66:01
- Label: Blue Note; BLP 1525
- Producer: Alfred Lion

Jimmy Smith chronology
A New Sound – A New Star, Vol. 2 (1956)	Jimmy Smith at the Organ (1956)	At Club "Baby Grand" Wilmington, Delaware (1956)

Singles from Jimmy Smith at the Organ
- 1. "I Cover the Waterfront" Released: 1957

Jimmy Smith at the Organ, also known as The Incredible Jimmy Smith, Volume 3, is the third album by American jazz organist Jimmy Smith, recorded over June 17–18, 1956 and released on Blue Note later that year.

== Release history ==
Jimmy Smith at the Organ was reissued on CD in Japan in 1995 as a part of their TOCJ-1500 series, without additional tracks. In 1997, the album was combined with Smith's previous two LP's—A New Sound... A New Star..., Vol. 1 and A New Sound – A New Star, Vol. 2—and released as A New Sound...A New Star...: Jimmy Smith at the Organ Vols 1–3, a two-disc boxset, also without additional tracks. In 2005, the album was globally reissued as At the Organ, Volume 3 with four additional cuts from the original session.

== Reception ==
Professional ratings
Review scores
Source	Rating
AllMusic	4/5 stars
The Penguin Guide to Jazz Recordings	(CD reissue)

The AllMusic review by Steve Leggett called the album, "one of his most energetic and varied albums".

== Track listing ==
All tracks are written by Jimmy Smith, except as noted.

Side 1
No.	Title	Writer(s)	Date recorded	Length
1.	"Judo Mambo"		June 18, 1956	5:31
2.	"Willow Weep for Me"	Ann Ronell	June 17, 1956	5:41
3.	"Lover, Come Back to Me"	Oscar Hammerstein II; Sigmund Romberg	June 18, 1956	6:42

Side 2
No.	Title	Writer(s)	Date recorded	Length
1.	"Well, You Needn't"	Thelonious Monk	June 18, 1956	6:23
2.	"Fiddlin' the Minors"		June 18, 1956	5:08
3.	"Autumn Leaves"	Joseph Kosma; Johnny Mercer; Jacques Prévert	June 17, 1956	4:43
4.	"I Cover the Waterfront"	Johnny Green; Edward Heyman	June 18, 1956	3:38

2005 CD reissue bonus tracks
No.	Title	Writer(s)	Date recorded	Length
8.	"Jamey"		June 17, 1956	6:00
9.	"My Funny Valentine"	Lorenz Hart; Richard Rodgers	June 17, 1956	6:20
10.	"I Can't Give You Anything But Love"	Dorothy Fields; Jimmy McHugh	June 18, 1956	4:48
11.	"Slightly Monkish"		June 18, 1956	5:27

== Personnel ==
=== Musicians ===
- Jimmy Smith – organ
- Thornel Schwartz – guitar
- Donald Bailey – drums

=== Technical personnel ===
- Alfred Lion – producer
- Rudy Van Gelder – recording engineer, mastering
- Reid Miles – design
- Francis Wolff – photography
- Leonard Feather – liner notes
