= Taru (album) =

Studio album by Lee Morgan
- Released: 1980
- Recorded: February 15, 1968
- Studio: Van Gelder Studio, Englewood Cliffs, NJ
- Genre: Jazz, hard bop
- Length: 38:05
- Label: Blue Note; LT 1031
- Producer: Francis Wolff, Duke Pearson

Lee Morgan chronology
The Sixth Sense (1967)	Taru (1980)	Caramba! (1968)

Alternative cover
- 2000 CD edition

Taru is an album recorded by jazz trumpeter Lee Morgan, recorded in 1968, but not released on the Blue Note label until 1980. The album features performances by Morgan, Bennie Maupin, John Hicks, George Benson, Reggie Workman and Billy Higgins.

== Reception ==
The AllMusic review by Scott Yanow stated: "His sextet (which includes Bennie Maupin on tenor, guitarist George Benson, pianist John Hicks, bassist Reggie Workman, and drummer Billy Higgins) is quite advanced for the period and inspires Morgan to some fiery and explorative playing."

Professional ratings
Review scores
Source	Rating
AllMusic	4/5 stars
The Penguin Guide to Jazz	3/4 stars
The Rolling Stone Jazz Record Guide	4/5 stars

== Track listing ==
All compositions by Lee Morgan, except as indicated.

1. "Avotcja One" (Hicks) – 6:45
2. "Haeschen" – 6:13
3. "Dee Lawd" – 5:52
4. "Get Yourself Together (Get Yo'self Togetha)" – 6:27
5. "Taru, What's Wrong with You" (Cal Massey) – 5:20
6. "Durem" – 7:28

== Personnel ==
- Lee Morgan – trumpet
- Bennie Maupin – tenor saxophone
- John Hicks – piano
- George Benson – guitar
- Reggie Workman – bass
- Billy Higgins – drums
