= The Last Session (Lee Morgan album) =

Lee Morgan (The Last Session)

Studio album by Lee Morgan
- Released: May 1972
- Recorded: September 17–18, 1971
- Studio: Van Gelder Studio, Englewood Cliffs, NJ
- Genre: Post-bop, jazz fusion
- Length: 66:51
- Label: Blue Note; BST 84901
- Producer: George Butler

Lee Morgan chronology
Live at the Lighthouse (1970)	Lee Morgan (The Last Session) (1972)

Lee Morgan (retroactively titled The Last Session) is the final studio album by jazz trumpeter Lee Morgan, released only after his death in 1972. It was originally released on the Blue Note label in 1972 as a double LP, and features performances by Morgan, Grachan Moncur III, Bobbi Humphrey, Billy Harper, Harold Mabern, Reggie Workman, Jymie Merritt and Freddie Waits.

== Reception ==
The Allmusic review by Michael G. Nastos awarded the album 4 stars, noting that with his last studio recordings Morgan took a step towards jazz fusion without sacrificing his artistic integrity: "It is unfortunate that the brilliant and forward-thinking Morgan was cut down at such a young age, for as the music was changing, he would have adapted, as this final statement valiantly suggests."

Professional ratings
Review scores
Source	Rating
Allmusic	4/5 stars
The Penguin Guide to Jazz	3.5/4 stars
The Rolling Stone Jazz Record Guide	3/5 stars

== Track listing ==
1. "Capra Black" (Harper) - 15:31
2. "In What Direction Are You Headed?" (Mabern) - 16:29
3. "Angela" (Merritt) - 6:24
4. "Croquet Ballet" (Harper) - 10:51
5. "Inner Passions Out" (Waits) - 17:36

== Personnel ==
- Lee Morgan - trumpet
- Grachan Moncur III - trombone
- Bobbi Humphrey - flute
- Billy Harper - tenor saxophone, alto flute
- Harold Mabern - piano, electric piano
- Reggie Workman - bass, percussion
- Jymie Merritt - electric upright bass
- Freddie Waits - drums, recorder
