= Lee-Way =

Studio album by Lee Morgan
- Released: Third week of May 1961
- Recorded: April 28, 1960
- Studios: Van Gelder Studio; Englewood Cliffs, New Jersey
- Genre: Jazz
- Length: 39:23
- Labels: Blue Note; BLP 4034
- Producer: Alfred Lion

Lee Morgan chronology
Here's Lee Morgan (1960)	Lee-Way (1961)	Expoobident (1960)

Lee-Way is an album by American jazz trumpeter Lee Morgan recorded on April 28, 1960 and released on Blue Note the following year. Morgan's quintet features saxophonist Jackie McLean and rhythm section Bobby Timmons, Paul Chambers and Art Blakey.

== Background ==
"The Lion and the Wolff" is dedicated to producers Alfred Lion and Francis Wolff.

== Reception ==
The AllMusic review by Scott Yanow states, "The music is essentially hard bop with a strong dose of soul; the very distinctive styles of the principals are the main reasons to acquire this enjoyable music."

Professional ratings
Review scores
Source	Rating
AllMusic	4/5 stars
The Penguin Guide to Jazz	3/4 stars
The Rolling Stone Jazz Record Guide	4/5 stars

== Track listing ==
=== Side 1 ===
1. "These Are Soulful Days" (Massey) – 9:25
2. "The Lion and the Wolff" (Morgan) – 9:40

=== Side 2 ===
1. "Midtown Blues" (McLean) – 12:09
2. "Nakatini Suite" (Massey) – 8:09

== Personnel ==
=== Musicians ===
- Lee Morgan – trumpet
- Jackie McLean – alto saxophone
- Bobby Timmons – piano
- Paul Chambers – bass
- Art Blakey – drums

=== Technical personnel ===
- Alfred Lion – producer
- Rudy Van Gelder – recording engineer, mastering
- Reid Miles – cover design
- Francis Wolff – photography
- Nat Hentoff – liner notes

== Charts ==
Chart performance for Lee-Way
Chart (2026)	Peak position
UK Jazz & Blues Albums (Official Charts)	21
