= Young Blues =

Studio album by Larry Young
- Released: 1960
- Recorded: September 30, 1960
- Studio: Van Gelder Studio, Englewood Cliffs, NJ
- Genre: Jazz
- Length: 37:09
- Label: New Jazz; NJ 8264
- Producer: Esmond Edwards

Larry Young chronology
Testifying (1960)	Young Blues (1960)	Groove Street (1962)

Young Blues is the second album led by jazz organist Larry Young. It was recorded in 1960 and released on the New Jazz label.

== Reception ==
Professional ratings
Review scores
Source	Rating
Down Beat	2.5/5 stars
Allmusic	4.5/5 stars
The Penguin Guide to Jazz Recordings	3.5/4 stars

The Allmusic site awarded the album 4½ stars, noting, "the best from his early period before he completely shook off the influence of Jimmy Smith... Recommended as a good example of his pre-Blue Note work."

== Track listing ==
All compositions by Larry Young except as indicated

1. "Young Blues" - 6:28
2. "A Midnight Angel" (Morris Bailey) - 2:24
3. "African Blues" - 4:55
4. "Little White Lies" (Walter Donaldson) - 4:15
5. "Minor Dream" (Ray Draper) - 5:03
6. "Something New/Something Blue" - 7:25
7. "Nica's Dream" (Horace Silver) - 6:39

== Personnel ==
- Larry Young - organ
- Thornel Schwartz - guitar
- Wendell Marshall - bass
- Jimmie Smith - drums
