= Search for the New Land =

1966 studio album by Lee Morgan

Studio album by Lee Morgan
- Released: August 1966
- Recorded: February 15, 1964
- Studio: Van Gelder Studio, Englewood Cliffs, NJ
- Genre: Post-bop, hard bop
- Length: 42:16
- Label: Blue Note; BST 84169
- Producer: Alfred Lion

Lee Morgan chronology
The Sidewinder (1963)	Search for the New Land (1966)	Tom Cat (1964)

Professional ratings
Review scores
Source	Rating
Allmusic	5/5 stars
DownBeat	4/5 stars
The Penguin Guide to Jazz	3.5/4 stars
The Rolling Stone Jazz Record Guide	5/5 stars

Search for the New Land is an album by jazz trumpeter Lee Morgan. A set with a group of regular Blue Note sidemen, Search for the New Land was recorded before The Sidewinder was released. Although it was recorded in 1964, the album was shelved for two years, then issued with the original catalogue number 84169.

== Reception ==
It has been described by jazz commentator Scott Yanow as "one of the finest Lee Morgan records." The album reached No. 16 on Billboard's Hot R&B LP's chart and No. 143 on the Top LP's chart.

== Track listing ==
All compositions by Lee Morgan

1. "Search for the New Land" – 15:45
2. "The Joker" – 5:04
3. "Mr. Kenyatta" – 8:43
4. "Melancholee" – 6:14
5. "Morgan the Pirate" – 6:30

== Personnel ==
=== Performance ===
- Lee Morgan – trumpet
- Wayne Shorter – tenor saxophone
- Herbie Hancock – piano
- Grant Green – guitar
- Reggie Workman – double bass
- Billy Higgins – drums

=== Production ===
- Bob Blumenthal – liner notes
- Micaela Boland – art direction, graphic design
- Michael Cuscuna – reissue producer
- Nat Hentoff – liner notes
- Gordon Jee – creative director
- Alfred Lion – producer
- Reid Miles – cover design
- Rudy Van Gelder – engineer, remastering
- Francis Wolff – photography, cover photo

== Charts ==
Chart performance for Search for the New Land
Chart (2024)	Peak position
Belgian Albums (Ultratop Flanders)	80
