= Leeway (disambiguation) =

Leeway is the amount of drift motion to leeward of an object floating in the water.

Leeway may also refer to:

== Music ==
- Lee-Way, 1961 studio album by Lee Morgan
- Leeway (band), American crossover thrash band

== People ==
- Joe Leeway (born 1955), British musician and songwriter
