= Lawrence of Newark =

Studio album by Larry Young
- Released: 1975
- Recorded: 1973
- Genre: Avant-garde jazz, Jazz fusion
- Length: 37:36
- Label: Perception Records
- Producer: Larry Young

Larry Young chronology
Mother Ship (1973)	Lawrence of Newark (1975)	Fuel (1975)

Lawrence of Newark is a jazz album by organist/keyboardist Larry Young, released on the Perception Records label.

The album is Young's debut for Perception Records which has since been reissued on CD by Castle Records. Perception Records went out of business shortly after the release of this recording, so it has never been widely available, and hence rarely heard in the 70s and 80s.

Lawrence of Newark represents Larry Young's first non-Blue Note recording as a leader post-Lifetime and is startling for its fresh look at how the organ is used in jazz and in improvisation.

== Reception ==
The Allmusic review by Thom Jurek stated: "The CD reissue has fine sound ... it should not be overlooked. The DJs just haven't discovered this one yet. Awesome."

Professional ratings
Review scores
Source	Rating
Allmusic	4.5/5 stars
The Penguin Guide to Jazz Recordings	2.5/4 stars

== Track listing ==
All tracks composed by Larry Young

1. "Saudia" - 4:30
2. "Alive" - 1:54
3. "Hello Your Quietness (Islands)" - 10:05
4. "Sunshine Fly Away" - 8:38
5. "Khalid of Space, Pt. 2: Welcome" - 12:29

== Personnel ==
- Juini Booth - bass
- Stacey Edwards - conga, percussion
- James Flores - drums
- Art Gore - drums, electric piano
- Abdul Hakim - bongos, percussion
- Armen Halburian - bells, conga, percussion
- Diedre Johnson - cello
- Howard King - drums
- Poppy LaBoy - percussion
- Cedric Lawson - electric piano
- Charles Magee - electric trumpet, trumpet
- Dennis Mourouse - electric saxophone, tenor saxophone
- Umar Abdul Muizz - conga, percussion
- Don Pate - bass
- Abdul Sahid - drums
- Pharoah Sanders - tenor saxophone
- Jumma Santos - conga, cowbell, hi-hat, percussion, tambourine, tom-tom, whistling
- Danny Toan - guitar
- James Blood Ulmer - guitar
- Larry Young - bongos, keyboards, organ, percussion, producer, remixing, vocals
