= Contrasts (Larry Young album) =

Studio album by Larry Young
- Released: May 1968
- Recorded: September 18, 1967; Van Gelder Studio, Englewood Cliffs
- Genre: Jazz
- Length: 39:09
- Label: Blue Note; BST 84266
- Producer: Duke Pearson or Francis Wolff

Larry Young chronology
Of Love and Peace (1966)	Contrasts (1968)	Heaven on Earth (1968)

Contrasts is an album by American organist Larry Young recorded in 1967 and released on the Blue Note label.

== Reception ==
The Allmusic review by Scott Yanow awarded the album 4 stars and stated "The adventurous music is sometimes quite intense but also grooves in its own eccentric way, offering listeners a very fresh sound on organ".

Professional ratings
Review scores
Source	Rating
Allmusic	4/5 stars

== Track listing ==
All compositions by Larry Young except as indicated.

1. "Majestic Soul" - 11:58
2. "Evening" - 7:12
3. "Major Affair" - 3:50
4. "Wild Is the Wind" (Dimitri Tiomkin, Ned Washington) - 4:31
5. "Tender Feelings" (Tyrone Washington) - 6:51
6. "Means Happiness" - 4:47

== Personnel ==
- Larry Young - organ
- Hank White - flugelhorn (tracks 1, 2, 5–6)
- Herbert Morgan, Tyrone Washington - tenor saxophone (tracks 1, 2, 5–6)
- Eddie Wright - guitar (tracks 1 & 4)
- Eddie Gladden - drums
- Stacey Edwards - congas (tracks 1, 2, 4–5)
- Althea Young - vocals (track 4)
