= Caramba! (album) =

¡Caramba!

Studio album by Lee Morgan
- Released: Mid-December 1968
- Recorded: May 3, 1968
- Studio: Van Gelder Studio, Englewood Cliffs, New Jersey
- Genre: Jazz
- Length: 38:41 (original LP); 44:41 (CD reissue)
- Label: Blue Note
- Producer: Francis Wolff

Lee Morgan chronology
Taru (1968)	¡Caramba! (1968)	Live at the Lighthouse (1970)

¡Caramba! is an album by jazz trumpeter Lee Morgan, released on the Blue Note label in 1968. It features performances by Morgan, Bennie Maupin, Cedar Walton, Reggie Workman and Billy Higgins with arrangements by Cal Massey.

== Reception ==
Professional ratings
Review scores
Source	Rating
AllMusic	3.5/5 stars
DownBeat	4/5 stars
The Penguin Guide to Jazz	3/4 stars

The AllMusic review by Scott Yanow stated: "Although not essential, this CD is a welcome reissue."

== Track listing ==
All compositions by Lee Morgan, except as indicated.

1. "Caramba" – 12:24
2. "Suicide City" – 7:32
3. "Cunning Lee" – 6:13
4. "Soulita" – 6:03
5. "Helen's Ritual" – 6:29
6. "A Baby's Smile" (Massey) – 6:00 Bonus track on CD

== Personnel ==
- Lee Morgan – trumpet
- Bennie Maupin – tenor saxophone
- Cedar Walton – piano
- Reggie Workman – bass
- Billy Higgins – drums
- Cal Massey – arranger

== Charts ==
Chart performance for Caramba! in 1968-1969
Chart (1969)	Peak position
US Billboard Top LPs	190

Chart performance for Caramba! in 2022
Chart (2022)	Peak position
Belgian Albums (Ultratop Wallonia)	197
Scottish Albums (OCC)	89
