= The Rumproller =

Studio album by Lee Morgan
- Released: Mid January 1966
- Recorded: April 9 & 21, 1965
- Studio: Van Gelder Studio, Englewood Cliffs, NJ
- Genre: Jazz
- Length: 48:14
- Label: Blue Note; BST 84199
- Producer: Alfred Lion

Lee Morgan chronology
Tom Cat (1964)	The Rumproller (1966)	The Gigolo (1965)

The Rumproller is an album by jazz trumpeter Lee Morgan released on the Blue Note label. It was recorded mainly on April 21, 1965 and features performances by Morgan with Joe Henderson, Ronnie Mathews, Victor Sproles, and Billy Higgins.

== Reception ==
The AllMusic review by Scott Yanow awarded the album 3 stars stating "This album is worth picking up but it is not essential."

Professional ratings
Review scores
Source	Rating
AllMusic	3/5 stars
DownBeat	4/5 stars
The Penguin Guide to Jazz	3/4 stars
The Rolling Stone Jazz Record Guide	4/5 stars

== Track listing ==
All compositions by Lee Morgan except where noted

1. "The Rumproller" (Andrew Hill) - 10:29
2. "Desert Moonlight" - 9:26
3. "Eclipso" - 6:56
4. "Edda" (Wayne Shorter) - 7:23
5. "The Lady" (Rudy Stevenson) - 7:34

Bonus track on CD reissue:

6. "Venus di Mildew" (Shorter) - 6:26

== Personnel ==
- Lee Morgan - trumpet
- Joe Henderson - tenor saxophone
- Ronnie Mathews - piano
- Victor Sproles - bass
- Billy Higgins - drums
