= The Gigolo (album) =

Studio album by Lee Morgan
- Released: Early June 1968
- Recorded: June 25 & July 1, 1965
- Studio: Van Gelder Studio, Englewood Cliffs, NJ
- Genre: Hard bop, post-bop
- Length: 37:30 original LP
- Label: Blue Note; BST 84212
- Producer: Alfred Lion

Lee Morgan chronology
The Rumproller (1965)	The Gigolo (1968)	Cornbread (1965)

The Gigolo is an album by jazz trumpeter Lee Morgan released on the Blue Note label in 1968. It was recorded on June 25 & July 1, 1965 and features performances by Morgan with a quintet featuring Wayne Shorter, Harold Mabern, Bob Cranshaw and Billy Higgins.

== Reception ==
The Allmusic review by Scott Yanow awarded the album 4½ stars stating "There are no weak selections on this set and the playing by the leader, Wayne Shorter on tenor, pianist Harold Mabern, bassist Bob Cranshaw, and drummer Billy Higgins is beyond any serious criticism."

Professional ratings
Review scores
Source	Rating
Allmusic	4.5/5 stars
The Penguin Guide to Jazz	3.5/4 stars
The Rolling Stone Jazz Record Guide	4/5 stars

== Track listing ==
All compositions by Lee Morgan except where noted

1. "Yes I Can, No You Can't" – 7:26
2. "Trapped" (Wayne Shorter) – 5:59
3. "Speedball" – 5:32
4. "The Gigolo" – 11:07
5. "You Go to My Head" (J. Fred Coots, Haven Gillespie) – 7:22
6. "The Gigolo" [Alternate Take] – 10:04 Bonus track on CD

Recorded on June 25 (#2) and July 1 (all others), 1965.

== Personnel ==
- Lee Morgan – trumpet
- Wayne Shorter – tenor saxophone
- Harold Mabern – piano
- Bob Cranshaw – bass
- Billy Higgins – drums
