= The Sidewinder =

Studio album by Lee Morgan
- Released: July 1964
- Recorded: December 21, 1963
- Studios: Van Gelder Studio; Englewood Cliffs, New Jersey
- Genres: Jazz, hard bop
- Length: 40:59
- Label: Blue Note
- Producer: Alfred Lion

Lee Morgan chronology
Take Twelve (1962)	The Sidewinder (1964)	Search for the New Land (1964)

Singles from The Sidewinder
- 1. "The Sidewinder, Parts 1 & 2" Released: mid-to-late 1964

Professional ratings
Review scores
Source	Rating
AllAboutJazz	5/5 stars
Allmusic	5/5 stars
Penguin Guide to Jazz	👑
The Rolling Stone Jazz Record Guide	4/5 stars

The Sidewinder is a 1964 album by the jazz trumpeter Lee Morgan, recorded at the Van Gelder Studio in Englewood Cliffs, New Jersey, U.S. It was released on the Blue Note label as BLP 4157 (mono) and BST 84157 (stereo).

The title track is perhaps Morgan's best-known composition; it would go on to become a jazz standard, and was additionally released as a single, reaching number 81 on the Billboard Hot 100 in January 1965.

== Commercial performance and impact ==
The album became Blue Note's best-selling record ever, breaking the previous sales record and saving the label from near bankruptcy. Record producer Michael Cuscuna recalls the unexpected success: "the company issued only 4,000 copies upon release. Needless to say, they ran out of stock in three or four days. And 'The Sidewinder' became a runaway smash making the pop 100 charts." By January 1965, the album had reached No. 25 on the Billboard chart. The title track was used as the music in a Chrysler television advertisement and as a theme for television shows.

At the insistence of Blue Note executives, several of Morgan's intended follow-up albums either had their release postponed or were shelved entirely so that Blue Note could score "another 'Sidewinder'." Morgan's subsequent albums would therefore attempt to approximate the format and appeal of The Sidewinder by opening with a soul-jazz boogaloo inspired composition while also attempting to capture a hard bop aesthetic. This approach is said to be most noticeable on Morgan's immediate follow-up albums, including The Rumproller, The Gigolo and Cornbread.

== Critical reception ==
The Penguin Guide to Jazz selected this album as part of its suggested "Core Collection" (with a crown), calling the title track "a glorious 24-bar theme as sinuous and stinging as the beast of the title. It was both the best and worst thing that was ever to happen to Morgan before the awful events of 19 February 1972," referring to Morgan's killing at the hand of his common-law wife, Helen Moore. The album was identified by Scott Yanow in his AllMusic essay "Hard Bop" as one of the 17 Essential Hard Bop Recordings.

In 2024, the album was selected to the National Recording Registry by the Library of Congress as being "culturally, historically, and/or aesthetically significant".

== Track listing ==
All songs composed by Lee Morgan.

1. "The Sidewinder" – 10:25
2. "Totem Pole" – 10:11
3. "Gary's Notebook" – 6:03
4. "Boy, What a Night" – 7:30
5. "Hocus-Pocus" – 6:21
6. "Totem Pole" [Alternative take] – 9:57 Bonus track on CD reissue

== Personnel ==
- Lee Morgan – trumpet
- Joe Henderson – tenor saxophone
- Barry Harris – piano
- Bob Cranshaw – double bass
- Billy Higgins – drums

== Charts ==
Chart performance for The Sidewinder
Chart (1964–2026)	Peak position
Australian Jazz & Blues Albums (ARIA)	15
Swiss Albums (Schweizer Hitparade)	93
UK Jazz & Blues Albums (Official Charts)	4
US Billboard 200	25
