= Mother Ship =

Studio album by Larry Young
- Released: 1980
- Recorded: February 7, 1969
- Genre: Jazz
- Length: 41:17
- Label: Blue Note
- Producer: Francis Wolff

Larry Young chronology
Heaven on Earth (1968)	Mother Ship (1980)	Lawrence of Newark (1973)

Mother Ship is an album by American organist Larry Young, recorded in 1969 but not released on the Blue Note label until 1980.

== Reception ==
The AllMusic review by Scott Yanow stated: "This highly original set does not deserve to be so obscure."

Professional ratings
Review scores
Source	Rating
AllMusic	4/5 stars
The Penguin Guide to Jazz Recordings	2.5/4 stars
The Rolling Stone Jazz Record Guide	3/5 stars

== Track listing ==
All compositions by Larry Young

1. "Mother Ship" - 7:38
2. "Street Scene" - 6:56
3. "Visions" - 6:44
4. "Trip Merchant" - 12:53
5. "Love Drops" - 7:06

- Recorded at Rudy Van Gelder Studio, Englewood Cliffs, New Jersey on February 7, 1969

== Personnel ==
- Larry Young - organ
- Lee Morgan - trumpet
- Herbert Morgan - tenor saxophone
- Eddie Gladden - drums
