= Joseph Holliday =

Joseph Holliday or Joe Holliday may refer to:

- Joe Holliday (politician) (born 1958), a Gibraltarian politician
- Joseph Holliday (soccer) (born 2005), a Canadian soccer player
- Joe Holiday (musician) (1925–2016), an American jazz musician
