= Soul Cookin' =

Studio album by Thornel Schwartz with Bill Leslie
- Released: 1962
- Recorded: September 4, 1962
- Studio: Van Gelder Studio, Englewood Cliffs, NJ
- Genre: Jazz
- Length: 36:40
- Label: Argo; LP-704
- Producer: Esmond Edwards

Soul Cookin' is the sole album led by guitarist Thornel Schwartz, with saxophonist Bill Leslie, released in 1962 on Argo Records.

== Reception ==
Professional ratings
Review scores
Source	Rating
Allmusic	3/5 stars

Flophouse magazine noted: "A proficient blues player who talks the bop language without really, like better guitar players, stretching long lines over the familiar changes, Schwartz accompanies his short clusters of prickly, staccato notes with driving octave playing. The blues tunes on Soul Cookin’ benefit from Schwartz’ more crude than refined approach ... His peculiar, overdriven tone might get on your sleeve, yet gives that extra edge and is instantly recognizable".

== Track listing ==
1. "Soul Cookin'" (Esmond Edwards) – 4:25
2. "Brazil" (Ary Barroso, Bob Russell) – 4:15
3. "You Won't Let Me Go" (Buddy Johnson, Bud Allen) – 9:15
4. "Theme From Mutiny on the Bounty" (Bronisław Kaper) – 2:30
5. "Blue and Dues" (Thornel Schwartz) – 7:20
6. "I'm Getting Sentimental Over You" (George Bassman, Ned Washington) – 4:10
7. "Don't You Know I Care" (Duke Ellington, Mack David) – 4:45

== Personnel ==
=== Performance ===
- Thornel Schwartz – guitar
- Bill Leslie – tenor saxophone
- Lawrence Olds – organ
- Donald Bailey (tracks 1 & 6), Jerome Thomas (tracks 2–5 & 7) – drums

=== Production ===
- Esmond Edwards – supervision
- Rudy Van Gelder – engineer
