= Groove Street =

Studio album by Larry Young
- Released: 1962
- Recorded: February 27, 1962
- Studio: Van Gelder Studio, Englewood Cliffs, NJ
- Genre: Jazz
- Length: 40:03
- Label: Prestige; PRLP 7237
- Producer: Esmond Edwards

Larry Young chronology
Young Blues (1960)	Groove Street (1962)	Into Somethin' (1964)

Groove Street is an album by jazz organist Larry Young which was recorded in 1962 and released on the Prestige label.

== Reception ==
Professional ratings
Review scores
Source	Rating
Allmusic	3/5 stars
The Rolling Stone Jazz Record Guide	3/5 stars
The Penguin Guide to Jazz Recordings	3/4 stars

The Allmusic site awarded the album 3 stars and stated "Nothing all that substantial occurs, but fans of Jimmy Smith will enjoy the similar style that Larry Young had at the time."

== Track listing ==
All compositions by Larry Young except as indicated

1. "Groove Street" - 4:54
2. "I Found a New Baby" (Jack Palmer, Spencer Williams) - 5:25
3. "Sweet Lorraine" (Cliff Burwell, Mitchell Parish) - 9:24
4. "Gettin' into It" - 14:24
5. "Talkin' About J.C." - 5:56

== Personnel ==
- Larry Young - organ
- Bill Leslie - tenor saxophone
- Thornel Schwartz - guitar
- Jimmie Smith - drums
