= Fuel (Larry Young album) =

Album by Larry Young

Larry Young's Fuel

Studio album by Larry Young
- Released: 1975
- Recorded: 1975
- Genre: Jazz, jazz fusion
- Length: 42:25
- Label: Arista
- Producer: Terry Philips and Larry Young

Larry Young chronology
Lawrence of Newark (1973)	Larry Young's Fuel (1975)	Space Ball (1975)

Fuel is a jazz fusion album by organist/keyboardist Larry Young, released on the Arista Records label.

== Reception ==
Professional ratings
Review scores
Source	Rating
Allmusic	3.5/5 stars
The Rolling Stone Jazz Record Guide	3/5 stars
The Penguin Guide to Jazz Recordings	3/4 stars

Allmusic awarded the album 3½ stars and stated it contains "exotic tunes."

== Track listing ==
1. "Fuel for the Fire" (Philips, Torano, Young) - 6:06
2. "I Ching (Book of Changes)" (Young) - 6:25
3. "Turn off the Lights" (Logan, Saunders, Young) - 7:05
4. "Floating" (Torano) - 4:13
5. "H + J = B (Hustle + Jam = Bread)" (Young) - 6:19
6. "People Do Be Funny" (Philips, Young) - 3:43
7. "New York Electric Street Music" (Saunders, Torano, Young) - 8:34

== Personnel ==
- Larry Young - keyboards
- Santiago Torano - guitar
- Fernando Saunders - bass, backing vocals
- Rob Gottfried - drums, percussion
- Laura "Tequila" Logan - vocals
