= Take Twelve =

Studio album by Lee Morgan
- Released: 1962
- Recorded: January 24, 1962
- Studio: Plaza Sound Studios, NYC
- Genre: Jazz
- Length: 47:25
- Label: Jazzland
- Producer: Orrin Keepnews

Lee Morgan chronology
Expoobident (1960)	Take Twelve (1962)	The Sidewinder (1964)

Take Twelve is an album by jazz trumpeter Lee Morgan originally released on the Jazzland label. It was recorded on January 24, 1962, and features performances by Morgan with Clifford Jordan, Barry Harris, Bob Cranshaw and Louis Hayes.

== Reception ==
The Allmusic review by Scott Yanow awarded the album 4 stars stating "The superior material uplifts the set from being a mere 'blowing' date but it generally has the spontaneity of a jam session. It's one of Lee Morgan's lesser-known dates.".

Professional ratings
Review scores
Source	Rating
Down Beat (Original LP release)	3/5 stars
Allmusic	4/5 stars
The Penguin Guide to Jazz	3/4 stars
The Rolling Stone Jazz Record Guide	4/5 stars

== Track listing ==
1. "Raggedy Ann" - 6:46
2. "A Waltz for Fran" - 4:55
3. "Lee-Sure Time" - 8:27
4. "Little Spain" (Jordan) - 7:45
5. "Take Twelve" (Elmo Hope) - 4:55
6. "Second's Best" - 7:08
7. "Second's Best" [alternate take] - 7:29 Bonus track on CD reissue
- All compositions by Lee Morgan except as indicated

== Personnel ==
- Lee Morgan - trumpet
- Clifford Jordan - tenor saxophone
- Barry Harris - piano
- Bob Cranshaw - bass
- Louis Hayes - drums
