= Joe Holiday (musician) =

American jazz musician (1925–2016)

Joseph Befumo, known professionally as Joe Holiday (10 May 1925 – 9 February 2016), was an American jazz saxophonist who was born in Sicily.

The father of the Befumo family played clarinet. In 1925 the family emigrated to the United States, taking residence in Newark, New Jersey, where young Joseph picked up his father's instrument and mastered it. While still in his teens he began forming musical groups and obtained his first recording contract (with King Records) in 1949. He adopted the stage name "Joe Holiday" before the recording contract date.

Holiday played hard bop early in his career, but he is best known for his adaptations of the mambo style. Many of his sessions included members of Machito's ensemble, the Afro-Cubans. He had a hit in the U.S. with "This Is Happiness" in 1951 and recorded for Prestige Records with Max Roach and Billy Taylor. Sarah Vaughan recorded his composition "Serenada".

Holiday also does abstract painting. He and his wife, Kelly Holiday, are president and vice-president, respectively, of the St. Lucie Professional Arts League based in Port St. Lucie, Florida, where he presents annual "Art & All That Jazz" events, which have included Linda Cole (singer and daughter of Nat King Cole), Miami musicians Ira Sullivan, violinist Nicola Yearling, and pianist Lenore Raphael.

== Discography ==
=== As leader ===
- 1951 Joe Holiday Quintet (Prestige)
- 1954 Mambo Jazz, with Billy Taylor (Prestige)
- 1957 Holiday for Jazz

=== As sideman ===
With Larry Young

- Testifying (Prestige, 1960)
