= Lee Morgan =

American jazz trumpeter (1938–1972)

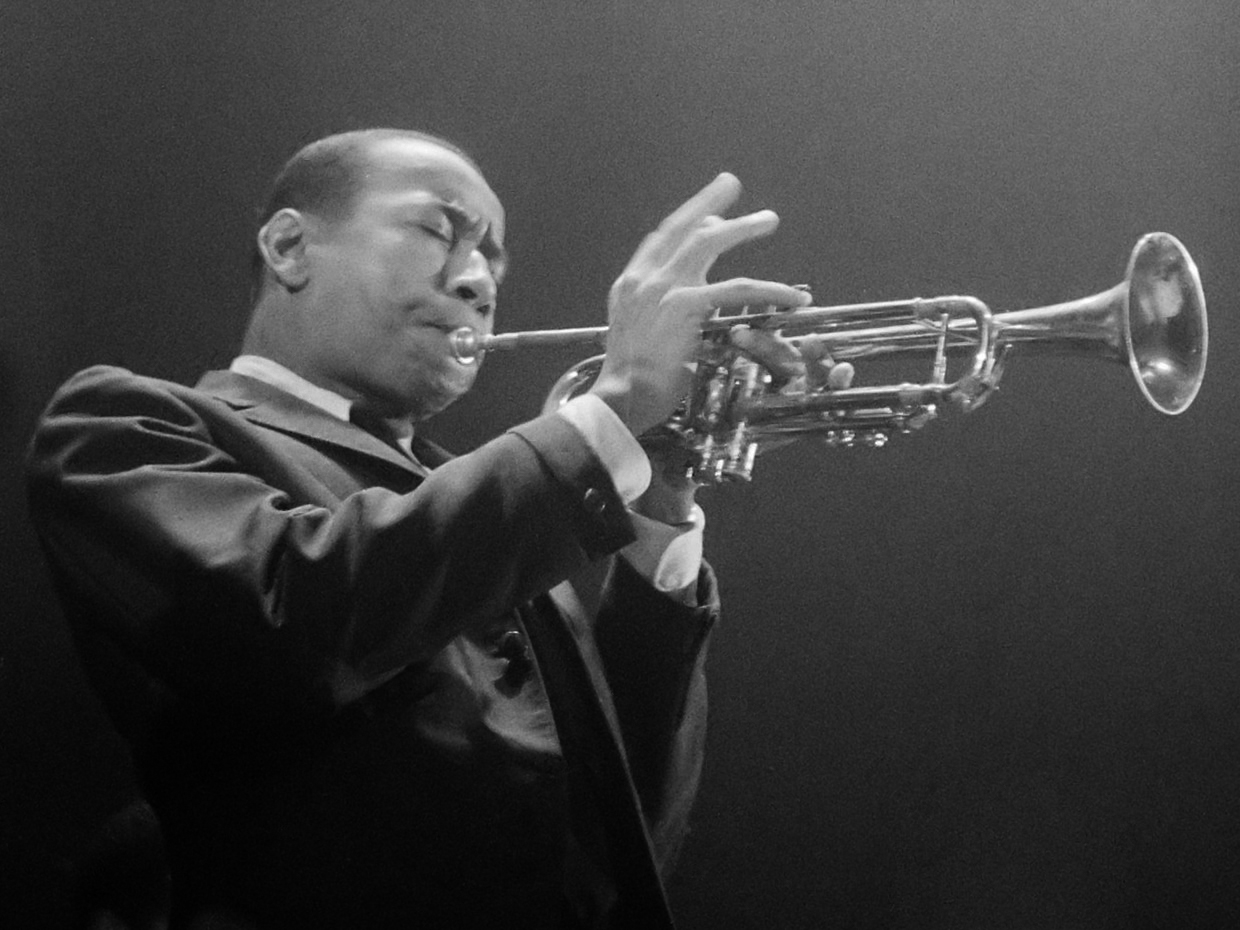
- Morgan in 1959

Background information
- Born: Edward Lee Morgan; July 10, 1938; Philadelphia, Pennsylvania, U.S.
- Died: February 19, 1972 (aged 33) New York City, U.S.
- Genres: Jazz; hard bop; post-bop
- Occupation: Musician
- Instruments: Trumpet; flugelhorn
- Works: Lee Morgan discography
- Years active: 1956–1972
- Labels: Blue Note; Vee-Jay
- Formerly of: The Jazz Messengers

Edward Lee Morgan (July 10, 1938 – February 19, 1972) was an American jazz trumpeter and composer. One of the key hard bop musicians of the 1960s and a cornerstone of the Blue Note label, Morgan came to prominence in his late teens, recording with bandleaders like John Coltrane, Curtis Fuller, Dizzy Gillespie, Hank Mobley, and Wayne Shorter, and playing in Art Blakey's Jazz Messengers.

Morgan stayed with Blakey until 1961 and started to record as leader in the late '60s. Morgan's solo recordings often alternated between conventional hard bop sessions and more adventurous post-bop and avant-garde experiments, many of which did not see release during his lifetime. His composition "The Sidewinder", on the album of the same name, became a surprise crossover hit on the pop and R&B charts in 1964. After a second stint in Blakey's band, Morgan continued to work prolifically as both a leader and a sideman until his death in 1972.

== Biography ==
Edward Lee Morgan was born in Philadelphia, Pennsylvania, United States, on July 10, 1938, the youngest of Otto Ricardo and Nettie Beatrice Morgan's four children.

Originally interested in the vibraphone, he soon showed a growing enthusiasm for the trumpet. Morgan could also play the alto saxophone. On his thirteenth birthday, his sister Ernestine gave him his first trumpet. His primary stylistic influence was Clifford Brown, with whom he took a few lessons as a teenager.

Morgan recorded prolifically from 1956 until a day before his death in February 1972. He joined Dizzy Gillespie's big band at 18 and remained as a member for a year and a half until economic circumstances forced Gillespie to disband the unit in 1958. Morgan began recording for Blue Note in 1956, eventually recording 25 albums as a leader for the label. He also recorded on the Vee-Jay label and one album for Riverside Records on its short-lived Jazzland subsidiary. He was a featured sideman on several early Hank Mobley records, and intermittently thereafter. On John Coltrane's Blue Train (1958), Morgan played a trumpet with an angled bell given to him by Gillespie.

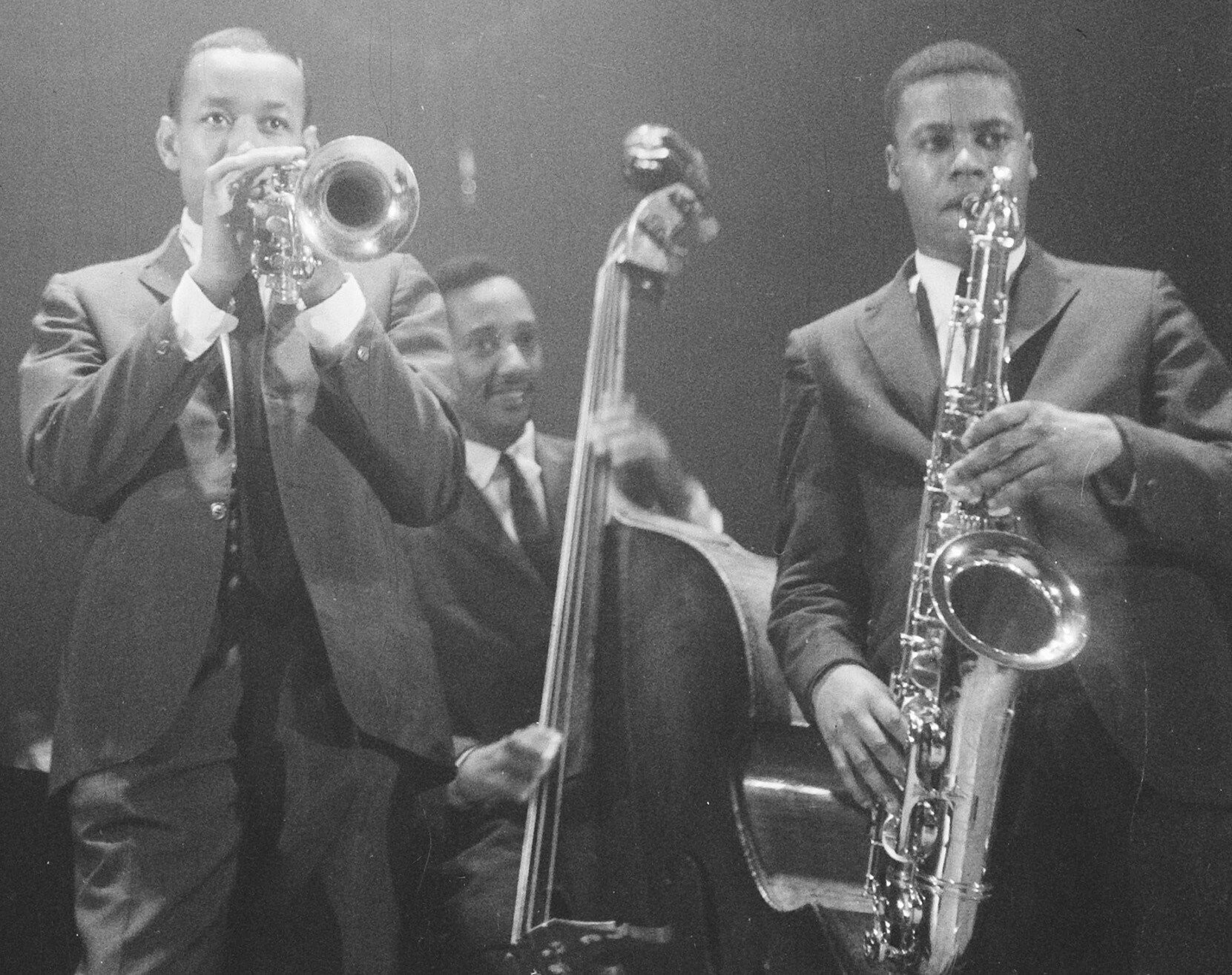
From left: Morgan, Jymie Merritt, and Wayne Shorter, 1959

Joining Art Blakey's Jazz Messengers in 1958, Morgan further developed his talent as a soloist and composer. He toured with Blakey for a few years and was featured on numerous albums by the Messengers, including Moanin', which is one of the band's best-known recordings. When Benny Golson left the Jazz Messengers, Morgan persuaded Blakey to hire Wayne Shorter, a young tenor saxophonist, to fill the chair. This version of the Jazz Messengers, including pianist Bobby Timmons and bassist Jymie Merritt, recorded many albums during 1959–61, including for Blue Note Africaine, The Big Beat, A Night in Tunisia, and The Freedom Rider. During his time with the Jazz Messengers, Morgan also wrote several tunes, including "The Midget", "Haina", "Celine", "Yama," "Kozo's Waltz", "Pisces", and "Blue Lace". The drug problems of Morgan and Timmons forced them to leave the band in 1961, and the trumpeter returned to Philadelphia, his hometown. According to Tom Perchard, a Morgan biographer, it was Blakey who introduced the trumpeter to heroin, which impeded progression in his career. On returning to New York in 1963, he recorded The Sidewinder. The title track cracked the pop chart in 1964 and served as the background theme for Chrysler television commercials during the World Series. The tune was used without Morgan's consent; after he threatened to sue, Chrysler agreed not to show the advertisement again and settled the case. Due to the crossover success of "The Sidewinder" in a rapidly changing pop music market, Blue Note encouraged its other artists to emulate the tune's "boogaloo" beat. Morgan himself repeated the formula several times with compositions such as "Cornbread" (from the eponymous album Cornbread) and "Yes I Can, No You Can't" on The Gigolo. According to drummer Billy Hart, Morgan said he had recorded "The Sidewinder" as filler for the album, and was bemused that it had turned into his biggest hit. He felt that his playing was much more advanced on Grachan Moncur III's essentially avant-garde album Evolution, recorded a month earlier, on November 21, 1963.

After this commercial success, Morgan continued to record prolifically, producing such works as Search for the New Land (1964), which reached the top 20 of the R&B charts. He also briefly rejoined the Jazz Messengers after his successor, Freddie Hubbard, joined another group. Together with tenor saxophonist John Gilmore, pianist John Hicks, and bassist Victor Sproles, this lineup was filmed by the BBC for seminal jazz television program Jazz 625.

As the 1960s progressed, he recorded some twenty additional albums as a leader, and continued to record as a sideman on the albums of other artists, including Wayne Shorter's Night Dreamer; Stanley Turrentine's Mr. Natural; Freddie Hubbard's The Night of the Cookers; Hank Mobley's Dippin', A Caddy for Daddy, A Slice of the Top, and Straight No Filter; Jackie McLean's Jacknife and Consequence; Joe Henderson's Mode for Joe; McCoy Tyner's Tender Moments; Lonnie Smith's Think and Turning Point; Elvin Jones's The Prime Element; Jack Wilson's Easterly Winds; Reuben Wilson's Love Bug; Larry Young's Mother Ship; Lee Morgan and Clifford Jordan Live in Baltimore 1968; Andrew Hill's Grass Roots; as well as on several albums with Art Blakey and the Jazz Messengers.

He became more politically involved in the last two years of his life, becoming one of the leaders of the Jazz and People's Movement. The group demonstrated during the taping of talk and variety shows during 1970–71 to protest the lack of jazz artists as guest performers and members of the programs' bands. His working band during those last years featured reed players Billy Harper or Bennie Maupin, pianist Harold Mabern, bassist Jymie Merritt, and drummers Mickey Roker or Freddie Waits. Maupin, Mabern, Merritt, and Roker are featured on the well-regarded three-disc Live at the Lighthouse, recorded during a two-week engagement at the Hermosa Beach club, California, in July 1970.

== Death and legacy ==
Morgan was killed in the early hours of February 19, 1972, at Slugs' Saloon, a jazz club in New York City's East Village where his band was performing. Following an altercation between sets, Morgan's live-in girlfriend, Helen Moore, shot him. The injuries were not immediately fatal, but the ambulance was slow in arriving on the scene as the city had experienced heavy snowfall that resulted in extremely difficult driving conditions. They took so long to get there that Morgan bled to death. He was 33 years old. Moore was arrested and spent a short time in prison before being released on parole. After her release, she returned to her native North Carolina and died there from a heart condition in March 1996.

Morgan and Moore are the subjects of a 2016 documentary I Called Him Morgan by Swedish filmmaker Kasper Collin. The film premiered on September 1, 2016, at the 73rd Venice Film Festival and was theatrically released in the U.S. on March 24, 2017. In his New York Times review, A. O. Scott called the film "a delicate human drama about love, ambition and the glories of music".

== Discography ==
Album	Recording year	Label
Lee Morgan Indeed!	1956	Blue Note
Introducing Lee Morgan	1956	Savoy
Lee Morgan Sextet	1956	Blue Note
Dizzy Atmosphere	1957	Specialty
Lee Morgan Vol. 3	1957	Blue Note
City Lights	1957	Blue Note
The Cooker	1957 (Released 1958)	Blue Note
Candy	1958	Blue Note
Peckin' Time	1958	Blue Note
Here's Lee Morgan	1960	Vee-Jay
The Young Lions	1960	Vee-Jay
Lee-Way	1960	Blue Note
Expoobident	1960	Vee-Jay
Take Twelve	1962	Jazzland
The Sidewinder	1963	Blue Note
Search for the New Land	1964 (Released 1966)	Blue Note
Tom Cat	1964 (Released 1980)	Blue Note
The Rumproller	1965	Blue Note
The Gigolo	1965 (Released 1968)	Blue Note
Cornbread	1965 (Released 1967)	Blue Note
Infinity	1965 (Released 1981)	Blue Note
Delightfulee	1966	Blue Note
Charisma	1966 (Released 1969)	Blue Note
The Rajah	1966 (Released 1985)	Blue Note
Standards	1967 (Released 1998)	Blue Note
Sonic Boom	1967 (Released 1979)	Blue Note
The Procrastinator	1967/1969 (Released 1978)	Blue Note
The Sixth Sense	1967 (Released 1970)	Blue Note
Taru	1968 (Released 1980)	Blue Note
Caramba!	1968	Blue Note
Live at the Lighthouse	1970	Blue Note
The Last Session	1971	Blue Note
