= Expoobident =

Studio album by Lee Morgan
- Released: Mid August 1961
- Recorded: October 14, 1960
- Studios: Universal Recorders, Chicago
- Genre: Jazz
- Length: 31:32 original LP
- Labels: Vee-Jay; VJLP 3015
- Producer: Sid McCoy

Lee Morgan chronology
Lee-Way (1960)	Expoobident (1961)	Take Twelve (1962)

Expoobident is an album by jazz trumpeter Lee Morgan originally released on the Vee-Jay label. It was recorded on October 14, 1960 and features performances by Morgan with Clifford Jordan, Eddie Higgins, Art Davis and Art Blakey.

== Reception ==
The Allmusic review by Steve Loewy awarded the album 4 stars stating, "The set is a tad more laid-back than the later classic Blue Note sessions. Nonetheless, this one offers its rewards, including a rare chance to hear Eddie Higgins in full force, a late of Blakey as a sideman, and a stunning front line with unsung giant Clifford Jordan."

Professional ratings
Review scores
Source	Rating
Allmusic	4/5 stars
The Penguin Guide to Jazz	3/4 stars
Record Collector	4/5 stars

== Track listing ==
1. "Expoobident" (Higgins) – 5:01
2. "Easy Living" (Rainger, Robin) – 5:57
3. "Triple Track" (Morgan) – 5:00
4. "Fire" (Shorter) – 4:51
5. "Just in Time" (Styne, Comden, Green) – 3:32
6. "The Hearing" (Jordan) – 3:36
7. "Lost and Found" (Jordan) – 3:35

Bonus tracks on CD reissue:

8. "Expoobident" [Alternate take] – 5:06
9. "Triple Track [Alternate take] – 5:12
10. "Fire" [Alternate take] – 5:07
11. "Just in Time" [Alternate take] – 5:46

== Personnel ==
- Lee Morgan – trumpet
- Clifford Jordan – tenor saxophone
- Eddie Higgins – piano
- Art Davis – bass
- Art Blakey – drums
