= Unity (Larry Young album) =

Studio album by Larry Young
- Released: August 1966
- Recorded: November 10, 1965
- Studio: Van Gelder Studio; Englewood Cliffs
- Genre: Jazz
- Length: 40:02
- Label: Blue Note
- Producer: Alfred Lion

Larry Young chronology
Into Somethin' (1965)	Unity (1966)	Of Love and Peace (1966)

Professional ratings
Review scores
Source	Rating
Allmusic	5/5 stars
DownBeat	3.5/5 stars
Penguin Guide to Jazz	👑
Encyclopedia of Popular Music	5/5 stars

Unity is an album by jazz organist Larry Young, released on the Blue Note label in August, 1966. The album features trumpeter Woody Shaw, tenor saxophonist Joe Henderson and drummer Elvin Jones. While not free jazz, the album features experimentation that was innovative for the time. Young chose the title because, "although everybody on the date was very much an individualist, they were all in the same frame of mood. It was evident from the start that everything was fitting together." The album was Young's second for Blue Note, and is widely considered a "post-bop" classic.

== Music ==
Three of the six tracks were composed by Woody Shaw. The first, "Zoltan", starts with part of a march from the Háry János suite of Zoltán Kodály and continues in the Lydian mode. The fourth, "The Moontrane", is dedicated to John Coltrane, "as can be heard in the harmonic cycles in it", explained Shaw. The last, "Beyond All Limits", has a difficult harmonic progression, but, in Shaw's words, "once the inherent difficulties of the tune are solved, there are no limits as to where you can go with it". "If" is a 12-bar Joe Henderson composition; "Monk's Dream" (played mainly by Young and drummer Elvin Jones) is by Thelonious Monk; and "Softly, as in a Morning Sunrise" is a Hammerstein and Romberg composition.

Elvin Jones played "a standard 4-piece drum kit with two cymbals and hi-hat".

== Reception ==
Scott Yanow states that Unity "is considered Larry Young's finest recording". Billboard Magazine called the album "a sureshot for jazz fans". The Penguin Guide to Jazz included the album in its suggested “core collection”, and awarded it a rare crown and four-star rating, describing it as "Quite simply a masterpiece." Saxophonist Michael Brecker referred to the album as an early favorite, as has heavy metal guitarist Alex Skolnick.

The album's cover art, by Reid Miles, has also become well known. In 2008, graphic designer Mike Dempsey picked it as one of his favorite album covers, stating that it shows "Ultimate simplicity [...] Put in an album rack today it would still raise an eyebrow as it looks remarkably fresh".

== Track listing ==
=== Original LP ===
No.	Title	Writer(s)	Length
1.	"Zoltan"	Woody Shaw	7:41
2.	"Monk's Dream"	Thelonious Monk	5:48
3.	"If"	Joe Henderson	6:46
4.	"The Moontrane"	Shaw	7:21
5.	"Softly, As in a Morning Sunrise"	Oscar Hammerstein II, Sigmund Romberg	6:24
6.	"Beyond All Limits"	Shaw	6:02

=== 2014 Blue Note SHM-CD Remaster Edition (Japan Release) ===
No.	Title	Writer(s)	Length
1.	"Zoltan"	Woody Shaw	7:41
2.	"Monk's Dream"	Thelonious Monk	5:48
3.	"If"	Joe Henderson	6:46
4.	"The Moontrane"	Shaw	7:21
5.	"Softly, As in a Morning Sunrise"	Oscar Hammerstein II, Sigmund Romberg	6:24
6.	"Beyond All Limits"	Shaw	6:02
7.	"If" (Alternate Take 1)	Henderson	6:27
8.	"If" (Alternate Take 2)	Henderson	5:42
9.	"The Moontrane" (Alternate Take)	Shaw	6:40
10.	"Beyond All Limits" (Alternate Take)	Shaw	6:03

== Personnel ==
=== Musicians ===
- Larry Young – Hammond B-3 organ
- Woody Shaw – trumpet
- Joe Henderson – tenor saxophone
- Elvin Jones – drums

=== Production ===
- Alfred Lion – production
- Rudy Van Gelder – recording engineering; CD remastering (1998)
- Michael Cuscuna – reissue production
- Reid Miles – cover design
- Francis Wolff – photography
- Nat Hentoff – liner notes
- Bob Blumenthal – CD reissue liner notes (1999)

== Charts ==
Chart performance for "Unity"
Chart (2025)	Peak position
Greek Albums (IFPI)	67
