= Testifying (album) =

Studio album by Larry Young
- Released: 1960
- Recorded: August 2, 1960
- Studio: Van Gelder Studio, Englewood Cliffs, NJ
- Genre: Jazz
- Length: 46:32
- Label: New Jazz; NJ 8249
- Producer: Esmond Edwards

Larry Young chronology
Testifying (1960)	Young Blues (1960)

Testifying is the debut album led by jazz organist Larry Young which was recorded in 1960 and released on the New Jazz label.

== Reception ==
Professional ratings
Review scores
Source	Rating
Allmusic	3/5 stars
The Penguin Guide to Jazz Recordings	3.5/4 stars

The Allmusic site awarded the album 3 stars and stated "Easily recommended to fans of the jazz organ".

== Track listing ==
All compositions by Larry Young except as indicated

1. "Testifying" - 9:52
2. "When I Grow Too Old to Dream" (Oscar Hammerstein II, Sigmund Romberg) - 5:15
3. "Exercise for Chihuahuas" (Joe Holiday) - 7:34
4. "Falling in Love With Love" (Lorenz Hart, Richard Rodgers) - 5:04
5. "Some Thorny Blues" - 6:20 (Thornel Schwartz)
6. "Wee Dot" (J. J. Johnson) - 7:04
7. "Flamingo" (Edmund Anderson, Ted Grouya) - 5:23

== Personnel ==
- Larry Young - organ
- Joe Holiday - tenor saxophone (tracks 3 & 7)
- Thornel Schwartz - guitar
- Jimmie Smith - drums
