= Spaceball (album) =

Studio album by Larry Young
- Released: 1976
- Recorded: 1976
- Genre: Jazz
- Length: 41:45
- Label: Arista
- Producer: Terry Philips and Brian MacDonald

Larry Young chronology
Fuel (1975)	Spaceball (1976)	The Magician (1977)

Professional ratings
Review scores
Source	Rating
Allmusic	1.5/5 stars
The Rolling Stone Jazz Record Guide	3/5 stars
The Penguin Guide to Jazz Recordings	3/4 stars

Spaceball is a jazz fusion album by organist/keyboardist Larry Young, released on the Arista Records label.

== Reception ==
The Rolling Stone Jazz Record Guide said the album is "a triumph of musicianship over terrible ideas".

== Track listing ==
All tracks composed by Larry Young; except where indicated

1. "Moonwalk" - 5:00
2. "Startripper" (Terry Philips, Julius Brockington) - 4:44
3. "Sticky Wicket" (Terry Philips, Julius Brockington) - 9:26
4. "Flytime" (Terry Philips, Julius Brockington) - 4:50
5. "Spaceball" - 5:07
6. "Message from Mars" - 7:29
7. "I'm Aware of You" - 5:09

== Personnel ==
- Larry Coryell - vocals
- Larry Young - organ, keyboards
- Ray Gomez - guitar
- David Eubanks - bass
- Abdul Hakim - percussion
- Danny Toan - guitar
- Jim Allington - drums
- Al Lockett - flute, vocals, saxophone
- Paula West - vocals
- Barrett Young - percussion
- Farouk Abdoul Hakim - percussion
- Clifford Brown - percussion
