= The Sidewinder (composition) =

Song by Lee Morgan

from the album The Sidewinder
- Recorded: December 21, 1963
- Studio: Van Gelder Studio, Englewood Cliffs
- Genre: Soul jazz
- Label: Blue Note
- Composer: Lee Morgan
- Producer: Alfred Lion

Official audio
- "The Sidewinder" (Remastered 1999/Rudy Van Gelder Edition) on YouTube

"The Sidewinder" is a composition by Lee Morgan. It was first recorded for Morgan's Blue Note album of the same name, on December 21, 1963, and has become a jazz standard.

== Composition and recording ==
The name of the composition, according to Morgan, came from "the 'bad guy' on television", not the snake. Bars 17–18 of the 24-bar composition feature a surprise change to a minor chord.

Trumpeter Morgan recorded the track with tenor saxophonist Joe Henderson, pianist Barry Harris, double bassist Bob Cranshaw and drummer Billy Higgins. It was released as part of Morgan's album The Sidewinder, as well as on both sides of a single (BN 1911). The single entered Billboard's Hot 100 chart at No. 93 on December 19, 1964, and rose in subsequent weeks, peaking at No. 81.

== Reception ==
The track was an immediate commercial success and became the biggest success that producer Alfred Lion had up to that point. It helped make Morgan more prominent in the minds of jazz fans internationally.

The Penguin Guide to Jazz described the original recording as "a glorious 24-bar theme as sinuous and stinging as the beast of the title. It was both the best and worst thing that was ever to happen to Morgan before the awful events of 19 February 1972", a reference to the date of Morgan's murder.

== Influence ==
Television coverage of the 1965 baseball World Series included an advertisement by Chrysler that featured a version of Morgan's recording. Morgan was watching the program, did not know that his composition was to be used, and found out the next day that its use had not been authorized. After Morgan threatened to sue, Chrysler agreed not to show the advertisement again and settled the case.

"The Sidewinder" was soon covered by other musicians, including trombonist Kai Winding on his 1966 album Dirty Dog.

The success of the track led to similar themes being used on subsequent albums by Morgan and others: "it also established a more or less unbreakable pattern for future LPs, a bold, funky opener [...] followed by half a dozen forgettable blowing themes".
