= Babs Gonzales =

American bebop vocalist and poet (1919–1980)

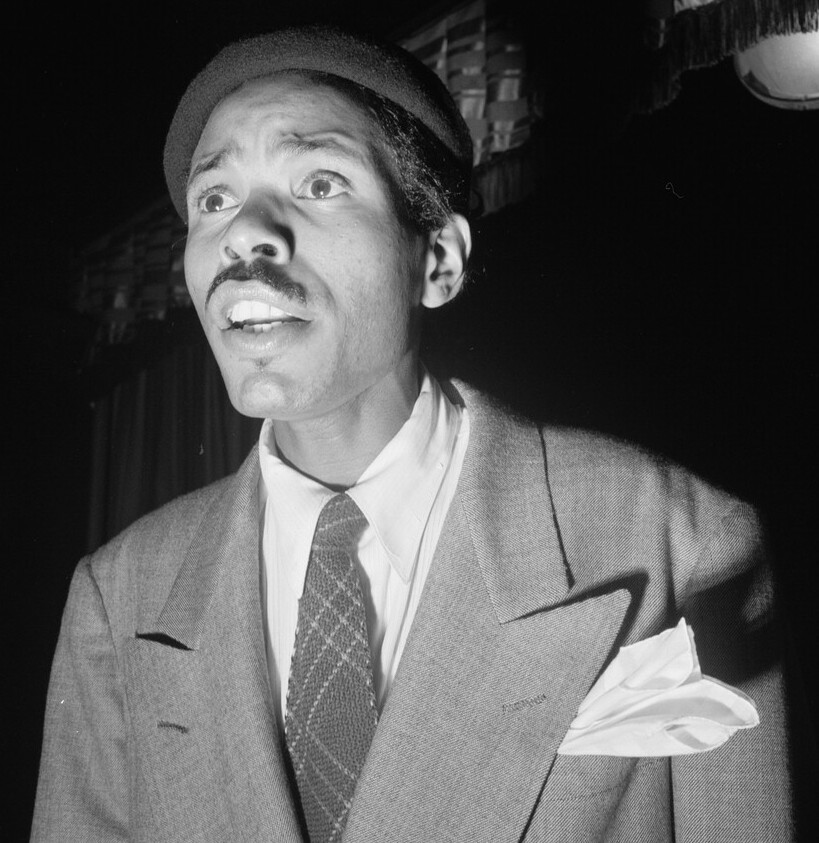
- Gonzales c. 1947, by William P. Gottlieb

Background information
- Born: Lee Brown; October 27, 1919; Newark, New Jersey, U.S.
- Died: January 23, 1980 (aged 60) Newark, New Jersey, U.S.
- Genres: Vocal jazz; spoken word; comedy
- Occupations: Musician; author

Babs Gonzales (October 27, 1919 – January 23, 1980), born Lee Brown, was an American bebop vocalist, poet, and self-published author. His books portrayed the jazz world that many black musicians struggled in, portraying disk jockeys, club owners, liquor, drugs, and racism. "There are jazz people whose influence can be described as minor", wrote Val Wilmer, "yet who are well-known to musicians and listeners alike ... You'd have to be hard-pressed to ignore the wealth of legend that surrounds Babs Gonzales." Jazz writer Jack Cooke explained that Gonzales "assumed the role of spokesman for the whole hipster world ... [becoming] something more than just a good and original jazz entertainer: the incarnation of a whole social group."

== Early life ==
Gonzales was born Lee Brown in Newark, New Jersey, United States. He was raised solely by his mother Lottie Brown alongside two brothers. Of his nickname, Gonzales explained, "my brothers are basketball players ... there was a basketball star in America named Big Babbiad, and so they were called Big Babs, Middle Babs, and I'm Little Babs." As a young man, Gonzales worked as band boy for swing bandleader Jimmie Lunceford, after which he relocated to Los Angeles. To circumvent racial segregation, Gonzales wore a turban and used the pseudonym Ram Singh, passing as an Indian national. Using this identity, Gonzales worked at the Los Angeles Country Club until becoming a private chauffeur to movie star Errol Flynn. While hospitalized for appendicitis in 1944, he assumed the Spanish surname Gonzales as he "didn't want to be treated as a Negro", later explaining that "they was Jim Crowing me in ofay hotels and so I said if it's just simple enough to change my last name, why not?" After the outbreak of World War II, Gonzales was forced to return home to Newark to report for military duty, but was declared unfit for service after arriving to his inspection dressed as a woman.

== Music career ==
=== 1940s ===
After working with Charlie Barnet and Lionel Hampton's big bands, Gonzales moved to New York and became involved with the burgeoning sound of bebop, a style which initially confused him. "I didn't understand what Charlie Parker was playing", said Gonzales, "I did not understand anything about bebop [until] Dizzy who – showing me chords, explaining to me what the melodic lines were that he was playing – opened up the music to me." Despite being a trained pianist and drummer, Gonzales preferred to sing rather than play an instrument, stating that "it's easier to sing and, above all, it's less tiring. We don't sweat while playing and we always look handsome. Plus, a singer usually earns more money than an instrumentalist."

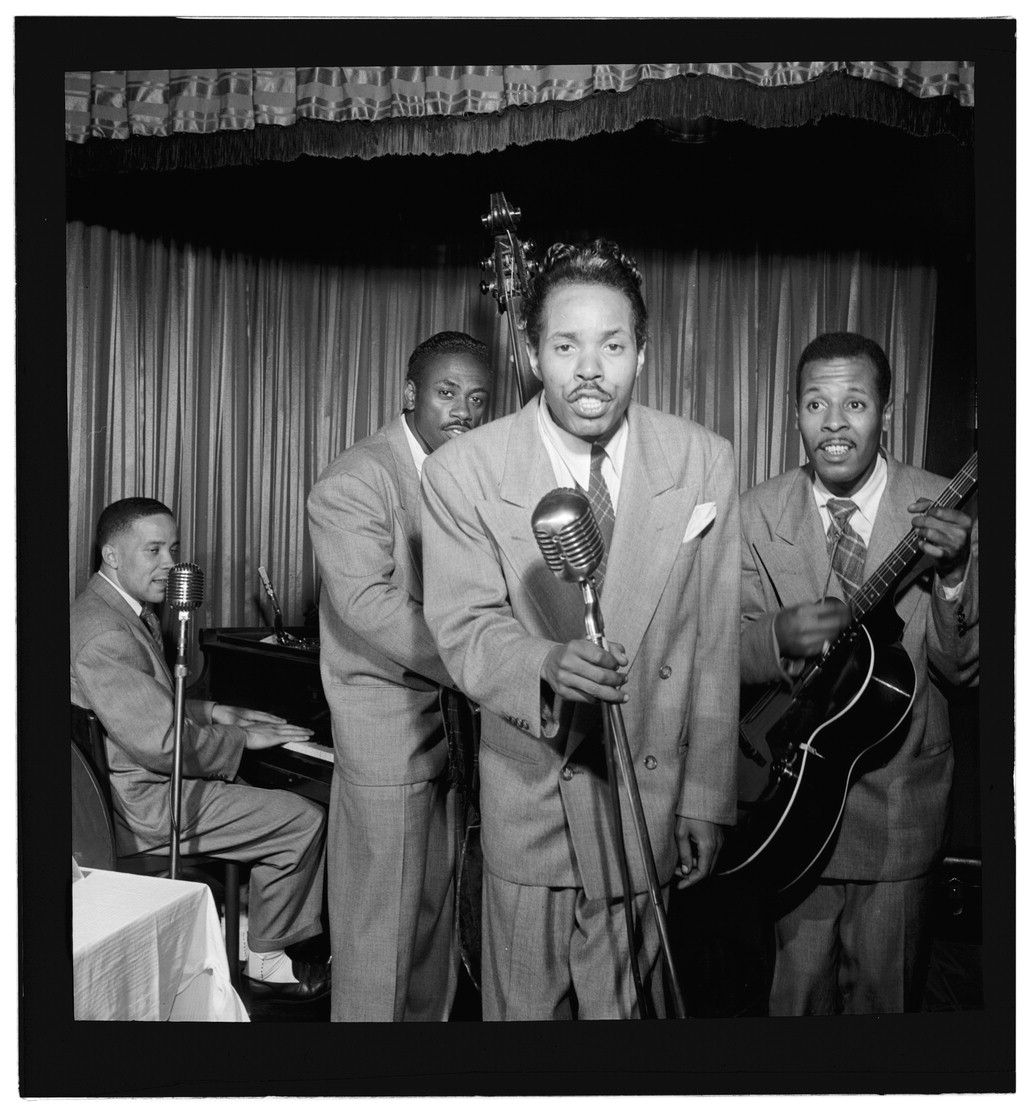
Gonzales in New York c. 1947, by William P. Gottlieb

Gonzales formed his own group, Babs' Three Bips and A Bop, releasing a number of 78 rpm singles for the Blue Note, Capitol, and Apollo labels in the late 1940s. Tadd Dameron, Sonny Rollins, Roy Haynes, Wynton Kelly, and Bennie Green were among the musicians who performed at these recording sessions. "I formed the Bips because I felt bebop needed a bridge to the people", said Gonzales, "The fire was there ... but it wasn't reaching the people."

The most notable of Babs' Three Bips and A Bop singles was "Oop-Pop-A-Da". Its prominent scat singing was credited with originating "an easy route to vocal improvisation which is still employed by jazz aspirants the world over." A cover version of "Oop-Pop-A-Da" later became one of Dizzy Gillespie's first commercial successes. Gonzales himself rejected being labelled a "scat" singer, stating, "I am a jazz singer. Scat is a technical way of interpreting a melody by paraphrasing it by means of onomatopoeia. The scat singers do not improvise. I do not stop improvising, like an instrumentalist; I improvise on the harmonic frame and use chords of passage."

==== Friendship with Sonny Rollins ====
Saxophonist Sonny Rollins's debut recordings were made with Gonzales at a session for the Capitol label in 1949. "Babs was a very wonderful guy", Rollins reminisced in 2019, "he gave me an opportunity to make my first recordings, and a chance to work with the older, more prominent musicians than myself at the time ... Fats Navarro, Lucky Thompson, people of that stature ... I was just a kid coming into the business." Reflecting on Gonzales's personality and achievements, Rollins remarked, "Just thinking about him makes me laugh ... in a respectful way, not at him but with him. He needs to be recognized and praised for what he did. I never forgot him. We were great friends. I admired him tremendously and respected what he was doing."

=== 1950s and 1960s ===
Gonzales released a string of albums and singles throughout the 1950s and 1960s, but became only a cult figure, ultimately self-publishing his own recordings. As composer and arranger, Gonzales provided music for Bennie Green ("Soul Stirrin'" and "Lullaby of the Doomed" on the album Soul Stirrin'), Johnny Griffin ("Low Gravy"), James Clay and David "Fathead" Newman ("Wide Open Spaces" and "Figger-ration"), Paul Gonsalves ("Gettin' Together") and others. As a guest vocalist he appeared on releases by James Moody, Eddie Jefferson, Jimmy Smith, Bennie Green, Johnny Griffin, and Savoy Records supergroup The Bebop Boys, where he appeared alongside musicians such as Fats Navarro and Bud Powell.

Throughout this time, Gonzales remained a behind-the-scenes influence in the jazz world, linking musicians to one other and introducing them recording to companies. For example, organist Jimmy Smith's association with the Blue Note label began under Gonzales's recommendation, with Gonzales writing introductory liner notes for Smith's A New Sound... A New Star..., Vol. 1. Dizzy Gillespie remembered Gonzales as "a musical scout ... that's how I got Charlie Persip in the band", reminiscing that "[Gonzales] called me up at my house one time, he said 'I'm over here in Newark, and there's a drummer over here who's a bitch!', so I said to bring him to rehearsal ... [Gonzales] brought him to rehearsal ... next day, [Persip] got the job."

==== Nightclub ownership ====
From 1958, Gonzales operated a nightclub called Babs' Insane Asylum, located in Sugar Hill, New York, at 155th Street and St. Nicholas Place. The house band included Hank Jones, Roy Haynes, and Milt Hinton. "These guys could have made some crazy money in the studios or with another orchestra, but they preferred to work at home for $100 a week", said Gonzales, "simply because it was a great place where all the jazzmen came." Gonzales refusal to work with a talent broker or manager because of social tension. "Joe Glaser hates me", claimed Gonzales, "he could not understand that [Louis] Armstrong or [Lionel] Hampton come to my house to play while I'm independent. And all the other impresarios hate me because I never wanted to fall under the thumb of any one of them. I am free and I owe nothing to anyone." Columnist Dorothy Kilgallen helped to promote the club; however, it eventually closed in 1959 due to a rent dispute. Gonzales explained, "I quit after two years when the guy who owned the building asked for a bigger cut. We threw his piano out the window!"

Gonzales attempted to open a similar club in Paris, named Le Maison Du Idiots, but lost access to his $10,000 investment after a general strike. He explained, "in America when a group calls a strike you pay it no mind, but in France, nobody works. At the conclusion, the people told me that the [wage] security I'd put up was gone with the old regime, and that if I wanted to reopen I would have to put up fresh security. There I was, ten grand gone and broke."

== Written works ==
Gonzales wrote and self-published two books: I Paid My Dues: Good Times... No Bread (1967) and Movin' on Down de Line (1975). The books were largely autobiographical but also featured short stories about the exploits of "shyster" agents, hustlers, pimps, and prostitutes, who were known to Gonzales. Jazz writer Scott Yanow described the books as "more colorful than accurate". Gonzales also printed a small "bebop dictionary". He personally sold these books at jazz concerts.

Due to Gonzales's esoteric jive vocabulary, he was dubbed "the inventor of the bebop language". Jazz writer Nat Hentoff elaborated, "[Gonzales] is always among the first to use and introduce the newest shifts in the argot, and he may indeed have coined a few himself." An excerpt of Gonzales's writing was later included in the historical collection The Cool School: Writing from America's Hip Underground, whose editor, Glenn O'Brien, defined Gonzales's voice as one of many "outsider voices ignored or suppressed by the mainstream [that] would merge and recombine in unpredictable ways, and change American culture forever."

== Personal life ==
From 1951, Gonzales began to travel regularly to Europe and remained there for months at a time. Though he makes no mention in his autobiographies, it appears that Gonzales was married for some time. A 1953 issue of Jet published a photograph of him posing beneath the Eiffel Tower with his "Swedish wife, champion swimmer and model" Sonja Juhlin; however, he later stated that he was not married, explaining, "I love freedom too much ... there are too many girls on earth to choose just one." Gonzales had earlier been characterized as a "hard playboy" by magazine columnist Jack Jackson, and claimed in his autobiographies that he had slept with hundreds of women. Jet editor Chester Higgins Sr. reported in 1970 that Gonzales had been living between Sweden and Denmark "for several years".

== Death ==
Gonzales died of cancer at Newark's College Hospital in January 1980.

== Discography ==
=== Albums ===
- Voila (Hope, 1958)
- Tales of Manhattan: The Cool Philosophy of Babs Gonzales (Jaro, 1959)
- Sundays at Small's Paradise (Dauntless, 1961)
- The Expubident World of Babs "Speedy" Gonzales (Expubidence, 1968)
- No Names Please – Guess Who? (Expubidence, unknown date)
- The Ghettosburg Address (Expubidence, 1970)

=== Compilation albums ===
- The Be-bop Story (Expubidence, unknown date)
- Weird Lullaby (Blue Note, 1992)
