= I've Got a New Woman =

Studio album by Jimmy McGriff
- Released: 1967
- Recorded: 1967 in New York City
- Genre: Jazz
- Label: Solid State SS-18030
- Producer: Sonny Lester

Jimmy McGriff chronology
A Bag Full of Blues (1967)	I've Got a New Woman (1967)	Honey (1968)

I've Got a New Woman is an album by American jazz organist Jimmy McGriff featuring performances recorded in late 1967 and originally released on the Solid State label.

== Reception ==
Professional ratings
Review scores
Source	Rating
AllMusic	3/5 stars

AllMusic rated the album 3 stars out of 5.

== Track listing ==
All compositions by Jimmy McGriff except as indicated

1. "I've Got a Woman"(Ray Charles) - 2:37
2. "Kiko" - 3:44
3. "All About My Girl" - 2:43
4. "Ode to Billy Joe" (Bobbie Gentry) - 2:37
5. "The Days of Wine and Roses" (Johnny Mercer, Henry Mancini) - 2:41
6. "Tennessee Waltz" (Redd Stewart, Pee Wee King) - 2:30
7. "You Are My Sunshine" (Jimmie Davis, Charles Mitchell) - 2:09
8. "The Swingin' Shepherd Blues" (Moe Koffman) - 2:35
9. "What's That" - 2:06
10. "When I Grow Too Old to Dream" (Sigmund Romberg, Oscar Hammerstein II - 3:43
11. "Embraceable You" (George Gershwin, Ira Gershwin) - 3:30

== Personnel ==
- Jimmy McGriff - organ
- Arthur "Fats" Theus - tenor saxophone
- Thornell Schwartz - guitar
- Willie "Saint" Jenkins - drums
