= Max Margulis =

American musician and photographer

Max Margulis (1907–1996) was an American musician, writer, music teacher, voice coach, record producer, copywriter, photographer and left-wing activist. He had a significant influence on the New York artistic and performing community particularly from the 1930s to the 1950s. As a co-founder of Blue Note Records in 1939, he was responsible for the seed capital to fund the record label. However, from the beginning, his participation was more as a supporter of the music rather than as creative producer. He also wrote advertising brochures and ad copy for the label.

Margulis reviewed music and wrote for left-wing and Marxist periodicals including Masses & Mainstream and the Daily Worker in the 1930s, 1940s and 1950s under the pseudonyms Max March and Martin McCall.

From 1949 through the 1960s, he was an active stereo photographer who photographed many of the most significant painters of the New York art scene in their studio, including Willem de Kooning.

As voice teacher, Margulis's pupils included many singers and actors, among them actors Stacy Keach, Harris Yulin, Faye Dunaway, and Sigourney Weaver. Margulis taught actor Laurence Olivier to sing for the 1960 film The Entertainer.

Singer-songwriter Judy Collins, credits Margulis with honing her skills, overcoming troublesome voice issues, and with the longevity of her career.
