= Larry Young (musician) =

American jazz organist (1940–1978)

Background information
- Also known as: Khalid Yasin
- Born: October 7, 1940; Newark, New Jersey, U.S.
- Died: March 30, 1978 (aged 37) New York City, New York, U.S.
- Genres: Jazz; soul jazz; jazz-funk; modal jazz; jazz fusion
- Occupations: Musician, songwriter
- Instrument: Organ
- Label: Blue Note

Larry Young (also known as Khalid Yasin [Abdul Aziz]; October 7, 1940 – March 30, 1978) was an American jazz organist and occasional pianist. Young's early work was strongly influenced by the soul jazz of Jimmy Smith, but he later pioneered a more experimental, modal approach to the Hammond B-3.

== Biography ==
Born and raised in Newark, New Jersey, United States, Young attended Newark Arts High School, where he began performing with a vocal group and a jazz band. He was also the cousin of the drummer Jimmie Smith.

Young played with various R&B bands in the 1950s, before gaining jazz experience with Jimmy Forrest, Lou Donaldson, Kenny Dorham, Hank Mobley and Tommy Turrentine. Recording as a leader for Prestige from 1960, Young made a number of soul jazz discs, Testifying, Young Blues and Groove Street. When Young signed with Blue Note around 1964, his music began to show the marked influence of John Coltrane. In this period, he produced his most enduring work. He recorded several times as part of a trio with guitarist Grant Green and drummer Elvin Jones, who were occasionally augmented by additional players. Most of these albums were released under Green's name, though Into Somethin' (with Sam Rivers on saxophone) became Young's Blue Note debut. Unity, recorded in 1965, remains his best-known album; it features a front line of Joe Henderson and the young Woody Shaw. Subsequent albums for Blue Note (Contrasts, Of Love and Peace, Heaven On Earth, Mother Ship) also drew on elements of the 1960s avant-garde and utilised local musicians from Young's hometown of Newark. Young then became a part of some of the earliest fusion groups: first on Emergency! with the Tony Williams Lifetime (with Tony Williams and John McLaughlin) and also on Miles Davis's Bitches Brew. His sound with Lifetime was made distinctive by his often very percussive approach and regular heavy use of guitar and synthesizer-like effects. He is also known for a jam he recorded with rock guitarist Jimi Hendrix, which was released after Hendrix's death on the album, Nine to the Universe.

In March 1978, he checked into a hospital for stomach pains. He died there on March 30, 1978, while being treated for what is said to have been pneumonia. However, the actual cause of his death is unclear.

== Discography ==
=== As leader ===
Recording date	Title	Label	Year released	Notes
1960–08	Testifying	New Jazz	1960	
1960–09	Young Blues	New Jazz	1960	
1962–02	Groove Street	Prestige	1962	
1964–11	Into Somethin'	Blue Note	1965	
1964–12, 1965–01, 1965–02	Larry Young in Paris: The ORTF Sessions	Resonance	2016	rec. for French radio
1965–11	Unity	Blue Note	1966	
1966–07	Of Love and Peace	Blue Note	1967	
1967–09	Contrasts	Blue Note	1968	
1968–02	Heaven on Earth	Blue Note	1969	
1969–02	Mother Ship	Blue Note	1980	LT series
1973	Lawrence of Newark	Perception	1975	
1975	Fuel	Arista	1975	
1976	Spaceball	Arista	1976	
1977	The Magician	Acanta/Bellaphon	1977	

=== As sideman ===
With Miles Davis

- Bitches Brew (Columbia, 1970) – rec. 1969
- Big Fun (Columbia, 1974) – 1969 sessions only

With Grant Green

- Talkin' About! (Blue Note, 1965) – rec. 1964
- His Majesty King Funk (Verve, 1965)
- I Want to Hold Your Hand (Blue Note, 1966) – rec. 1965
- Street of Dreams (Blue Note, 1967) – rec. 1964

With Gildo Mahones

- I'm Shooting High (Prestige, 1964) – rec. 1963
- The Great Gildo (Prestige, 1965) – rec. 1963-64

With John McLaughlin

- Devotion (Douglas, 1970)
- Love Devotion Surrender with Carlos Santana (Columbia, 1972)

With The Tony Williams Lifetime

- Emergency (Polydor, 1969)
- Turn It Over (Polydor, 1970)
- Ego (Polydor, 1971)

With others

- Joe Chambers, Double Exposure (Muse, 1978) – rec. 1977
- Jimmy Forrest, Forrest Fire (New Jazz, 1960)
- Jimi Hendrix, Nine to the Universe (Reprise, 1980) - on one track, rec. 1969
- Etta Jones, Love Shout (Prestige, 1963) – rec. 1962-63
- Pony Poindexter and Booker Ervin, Gumbo! (Prestige, 1963) - with bonus tracks on CD
- Woody Shaw, In the Beginning (Muse, 1983) - rec. 1965. also released as Cassandranite.
- Thornel Schwartz and Bill Leslie, Soul Cookin' (Argo, 1962) - Young listed as "Lawrence Olds"
- Buddy Terry, Natural Soul (Prestige, 1968) – rec. 1967
- Love Cry Want (Nicholas/Gallivan/Young), Love Cry Want (Newjazz.com, 1997) - rec. 1972
