= Alfred Lion =

American record executive born in Germany (1908–1987)

Alfred Walter Lion (born Alfred Wladislaus Lion; April 21, 1908 – February 2, 1987) was a German-born American record executive who co-founded the jazz record label Blue Note in 1939. Lion retired in 1967, having sold the company, after producing recordings by leading musicians throughout the 1940s, 1950s, and 1960s.

== Early years ==
Lion was born in Schöneberg, later a borough of Berlin, on April 21, 1908. He was raised in a Jewish family. His fascination with jazz began at the age of 16 when he saw a concert by Sam Wooding's Orchestra. In 1926, Lion emigrated to the United States, but while working on the New York docks he was attacked by an anti-immigrant worker; he returned to Germany to convalesce. From 1933, Lion lived in South America, working for German import-export companies, returning to New York in 1936. His presence at the From Spirituals to Swing concert at Carnegie Hall inspired him to start a record label.

== Career ==
In partnership with communist writer Max Margulis, who supplied the start-up capital, Lion founded Blue Note in 1939. In the label's first record session on January 6, Lion recorded two musicians who had impressed him at the earlier concert: the boogie-woogie pianists Albert Ammons and Meade Lux Lewis. The company's first hit, recorded in the same year, was Sidney Bechet's recording of "Summertime". It was notable for being issued on a 12-inch 78 rpm record instead of the then standard 10-inch owing to its length.

By the time Lion was drafted into the army, his Berlin childhood friend Francis Wolff had joined him, and under the wing of Milt Gabler and his Commodore Music Store, Wolff sustained the business in Lion's absence. (Margulis had by now permanently dropped out of any involvement with Blue Note.)

At the persuading of Ike Quebec, who was a Blue Note recording artist and talent scout during the 1940s, Lion began to explore more modern developments in jazz, and Quebec introduced Lion to Thelonious Monk, the first 'modern' jazz musician Blue Note was to record. Blue Note's involvement with modern jazz was not total for several years, and Lion continued his label's association with Bechet and clarinetist George Lewis into the 1950s. Wolff would supervise few sessions himself until after Lion's retirement, concentrating on the company's business affairs.

What became known as the "hard bop" style would predominate in Blue Note's output during the 1950s and 1960s. Musicians such as Art Blakey and Horace Silver among others epitomised this style. In the mid-1950s, however, Blue Note was a struggling label, hit by the record industry's changeover to the 12-inch LP format, but the popularity of the organ/soul jazz craze, driven by the innovative work of Jimmy Smith, ensured that the label survived. Ike Quebec, who was for much of the 1950s working outside of jazz and battling a heroin addiction, returned to Blue Note in 1959 as both a recording artist and as an employee, working in artists and repertoire (A&R) to help the label identify new talent and shape the content of LP releases.

Three significant elements make Blue Note releases stand out: the work of recording engineer Rudy Van Gelder, the photographs of Francis Wolff and the cover designs principally by Reid Miles. Lion and Wolff were also respected by musicians for their straight dealing and for "hanging out" in the jazz scene.

Blue Note also recorded avant-garde musicians like Andrew Hill and Cecil Taylor. Indeed, it was Lion's discovery of Hill, which he would later cite, along with his earlier involvement with Thelonious Monk and their fellow pianist Herbie Nichols, as having given him particular pleasure during his career.

Duke Pearson, who Lion hired to do A&R work after Quebec's death in 1963, helped to ensure that the label's roster remained fresh as a whole. In fact the popularity that Horace Silver's Song for My Father and Lee Morgan's The Sidewinder enjoyed resulted in Lion being pressured by his distributors into producing more hits.

Having suffered from heart problems for some years, Lion retired in 1967 having sold the Blue Note label and catalogue to Liberty Records in 1965. Wolff stayed with the label until his death in 1971. Liberty Records in turn was acquired by United Artists, and the Blue Note imprint went dormant until it was revived by record executive Bruce Lundvall under the ownership of EMI.

== Death ==
Lion died of heart failure in Poway, California at the age of 78. Although not widely published, Alfred Lion had a son (Raymond Abrams) by Ike Quebec's sister, Mary Francis Abrams.

== Documentary films ==
- Blue Note: A Story of Modern Jazz. Germany, 1996
- It Must Schwing! The Blue Note Story. Germany, 2018.
- Blue Note Records: Beyond the Notes. Switzerland, 2018.

== See also ==
- Category:Albums produced by Alfred Lion
