= List of hard bop musicians =

Hard bop is a subgenre of jazz that is an extension of bebop (or "bop") music. Journalists and record companies began using the term in the mid-1950s to describe a new current within jazz which incorporated influences from rhythm and blues, gospel music, and blues, especially in saxophone and piano playing. David H. Rosenthal contends in his book Hard Bop that the genre is, to a large degree, the natural creation of a generation of African-American musicians who grew up at a time when bop and rhythm and blues were the dominant forms of black American music. Prominent hard bop musicians included Horace Silver, Charles Mingus, Art Blakey, Cannonball Adderley, Miles Davis and Tadd Dameron. Hard bop is sometimes referred to as "funky hard bop." The "funky" label refers to the rollicking, rhythmic feeling associated with the style. The descriptor is also used to describe soul jazz, which is commonly associated with hard bop.

== A ==
- Pepper Adams - baritone saxophone
- Cannonball Adderley - alto saxophone
- Ahmad Alaadeen - saxophone
- Eric Alexander - saxophone
- Carl Allen - drums
- Eddie Allen - trumpet, flugelhorn
- Sinan Alimanović - piano, composer, arranger, conductor, educator
- Gene Ammons - tenor saxophone
- Curtis Amy - saxophone
- Gilad Atzmon - saxophone

== B ==
- Benny Bailey - trumpet
- Gabe Baltazar - saxophone
- Bootsie Barnes - saxophone
- Kenny Barron - piano
- Gary Bartz - saxophone
- Marcus Belgrave - trumpet
- Walter Bishop, Jr. - piano
- Art Blakey - drums
- Terence Blanchard - trumpet
- Walter Booker - bass
- Michael Brecker - tenor saxophone
- Cecil Brooks III - drums
- Tina Brooks - saxophone
- Bobby Broom - guitar
- Clifford Brown - trumpet
- Frank Butler - drums
- Kenny Burrell - guitar
- Donald Byrd - trumpet

== C ==
- Conte Candoli - trumpet
- Ron Carter - double-bass
- Paul Chambers - double-bass
- Pete Christlieb - saxophone
- Sonny Clark - piano
- Thomas Clausen - piano
- James Clay - saxophone
- Jimmy Cleveland - trombone
- Jimmy Cobb - drums
- Tony Coe - saxophone, clarinet
- George Coleman - saxophone
- Johnny Coles - trumpet
- John Coltrane - tenor and soprano saxophone
- Robert Conti - guitar
- Bob Cooper - sax, oboe
- Ray Copeland - trumpet
- Bob Cranshaw - double-bass
- Hank Crawford - saxophone
- Sonny Criss - saxophone
- Tony Crombie - drums
- Curtis Counce - double-bass
- Ronnie Cuber -saxophone
- Ted Curson - trumpet
- Junior Cook - saxophone

== D ==
- Carsten Dahl - piano
- Eddie Daniels - sax, clarinet
- Art Davis - double-bass
- Eddie "Lockjaw" Davis - sax
- Jesse Davis - sax
- Miles Davis - trumpet
- Nathan Davis - sax
- Richard Davis - double-bass
- Steve Davis - trombone
- Walter Davis, Jr. - piano
- Alan Dawson - drums
- Barbara Dennerlein - organ
- Jimmy Deuchar - trumpet
- John D'earth - trumpet
- Niels Lan Doky - piano
- Lou Donaldson - sax
- Kenny Dorham - trumpet
- Ray Draper - tuba
- Kenny Drew - piano
- Ted Dunbar - guitar

== E ==
- Charles Earland - organ
- Teddy Edwards - sax
- Mark Elf - guitar
- Booker Ervin - sax

== F ==
- Art Farmer - trumpet, flugelhorn
- Joe Farrell - flute, sax
- Victor Feldman - piano, vibes
- Tommy Flanagan - piano
- Ricky Ford - sax
- Frank Foster - sax
- Von Freeman - sax
- Curtis Fuller - trombone

== G ==
- Red Garland - piano
- Benny Golson - tenor saxophone
- Dexter Gordon - tenor saxophone
- Benny Green (pianist) - piano
- Grant Green - guitar
- Johnny Griffin - tenor saxophone
- Gigi Gryce - saxophone
- Randy Gelispie - drums

== H ==
- Charlie Haden - double-bass
- Tim Hagans - trumpet
- Chico Hamilton - drums
- Slide Hampton - trombone
- Herbie Hancock - piano
- Roland Hanna - piano
- Wilbur Harden - trumpet
- Bill Hardman - trumpet, flugelhorn
- Roy Hargrove - trumpet
- Philip Harper - trumpet
- Barry Harris - piano
- Eddie Harris - saxophone, organ
- Stefon Harris - vibraphone
- Antonio Hart - sax
- Hampton Hawes - piano
- Louis Hayes - drums
- Roy Haynes - drums
- Jimmy Heath - sax
- Percy Heath - double-bass
- Albert Heath - drums
- Bill Heid - piano, keyboards
- Joe Henderson - sax
- Wayne Henderson - trombone
- Vincent Herring - sax
- Billy Higgins - drums
- Buck Hill - sax
- Ron Holloway - tenor saxophone
- Richard Holmes - organ
- Stix Hooper - drums
- Elmo Hope - piano
- Lex Humphries - drums
- Freddie Hubbard - trumpet
- Bobby Hutcherson - vibraphone, marimba

== I ==
- Eric Ineke - drums

== J ==
- Milt Jackson - vibraphone
- Clifford Jarvis - drums
- Bobby Jaspar - sax, flute
- J. J. Johnson - trombone
- LaMont Johnson - piano
- Marc Johnson - bass
- Carmell Jones - trumpet
- Elvin Jones - drums
- Hank Jones - piano
- Philly Joe Jones - drums
- Sam Jones - double-bass
- Thad Jones - trumpet
- Clifford Jordan - sax
- Duke Jordan - piano

== K ==
- Geoff Keezer - piano
- Wynton Kelly - piano
- Rahsaan Roland Kirk - tenor sax, flute
- Ryan Kisor - trumpet

== L ==
- Pat LaBarbera - sax, clarinet
- Harold Land - sax
- John LaPorta - sax, clarinet
- Pete La Roca - drums
- Yusef Lateef - sax
- Doug Lawrence - sax
- Hubert Laws - flute, sax
- Hugh Lawson - piano
- Herbie Lewis - double-bass
- Victor Lewis - drums
- Booker Little - trumpet
- Joe Lovano - sax

== M ==
- Harold Mabern - piano
- Jon Mayer - piano
- Larance Marable - drums
- Hank Marr - organ
- Branford Marsalis - sax
- Pat Martino - guitar
- Cal Massey - trumpet
- Christian McBride - double-bass
- Les McCann - piano, keyboards
- Jack McDuff - organ
- Howard McGhee - trumpet
- Gary McFarland - vibraphone, vocals
- Al McKibbon - double-bass
- Jackie McLean - sax
- René McLean - sax, flute
- Charles McPherson - sax
- Jymie Merritt - double-bass
- Pierre Michelot - double-bass
- Mulgrew Miller - piano
- Charles Mingus - double-bass
- Blue Mitchell - trumpet
- Billy Mitchell - sax
- Red Mitchell - bass
- Hank Mobley - sax
- Thelonious Monk - piano
- Buddy Montgomery - vibraphone, piano
- Wes Montgomery - guitar
- Tete Montoliu - piano
- James Moody - sax
- Frank Morgan - sax
- Lee Morgan - trumpet
- Dick Morrissey - sax, flute
- Ronald Muldrow - guitar

== N ==
- Lewis Nash - drums
- Oliver Nelson - sax
- Phineas Newborn, Jr. - piano
- David Newman - sax

== P ==
- Horace Parlan - piano
- Don Patterson - organ
- John Patton - organ
- Cecil Payne - sax, flute
- Duke Pearson - piano
- Niels-Henning Ørsted Pedersen - double-bass
- Art Pepper - sax
- Bill Perkins - saxophone, flute
- Carl Perkins - piano
- Walter Perkins - drums
- Houston Person - sax
- Art Phipps - bass
- Richie Powell - piano
- Bud Powell - piano

== Q ==
- Ike Quebec - sax

== R ==
- Jimmy Raney - guitar
- Sonny Red - alto sax
- Freddie Redd - piano
- Dizzy Reece - trumpet
- Emily Remler - guitar
- Melvin Rhyne - organ
- Jerome Richardson - sax
- Larry Ridley - bass
- Ben Riley - drums
- Max Roach - drums
- Marcus Roberts - piano
- Red Rodney - trumpet
- Sonny Rollins - sax
- Wallace Roney - trumpet
- Renee Rosnes - piano
- Jim Rotondi - trumpet
- Charlie Rouse - sax

== S ==
- Joe Sample - piano
- Pharoah Sanders - saxophone
- Rhoda Scott - organ
- Shirley Scott - organ
- Woody Shaw - trumpet
- Sahib Shihab - sax, flute
- Wayne Shorter - sax
- Horace Silver - piano
- Zoot Sims - sax
- Jimmy Smith - organ
- Dr. Lonnie Smith - organ
- Melvin Sparks - guitar
- James Spaulding - saxophone
- Leon Spencer - organ
- Sonny Stitt - sax
- Idrees Sulieman - trumpet
- Ira Sullivan - trumpet, flugelhorn

== T ==
- Grady Tate - drums
- Art Taylor - drums
- Billy Taylor - piano
- Henri Texier - double-bass
- Lucky Thompson - sax
- The Three Sounds
- Bobby Timmons - piano
- Andrzej Trzaskowski - piano
- Stanley Turrentine - sax
- Tommy Turrentine - trumpet
- McCoy Tyner - piano

== V ==
- Harold Vick - sax, flute

== W ==
- Freddie Waits - drums
- Mal Waldron - piano
- Winston Walls - organ
- Cedar Walton - piano
- Wilbur Ware - double-bass
- Butch Warren - double-bass
- Kenny Washington - drums
- Peter Washington - double-bass
- Doug Watkins - double-bass
- Julius Watkins - French horn
- Michael Weiss - piano
- Randy Weston - piano
- Mark Whitfield - guitar
- Don Wilkerson - sax
- Baby Face Willette - organ
- Buster Williams - double-bass
- Tony Williams - drums
- Jack Wilson - piano
- Ben Wolfe - bass
- Phil Woods - sax, clarinet
- Reggie Workman - double-bass
- Richard Wyands - piano

== Y ==
- Larry Young - organ

== Z ==
- Joe Zawinul - piano, keyboards
