= List of soul jazz musicians =

The following is a list of soul jazz musicians.

== A ==
- Cannonball Adderley – sax
- Nat Adderley – cornet
- Allen & Allen
- Gene Ammons – sax
- Curtis Amy – sax
- Roy Ayers – vibraphone

== B ==
- Gary Bartz – sax
- Joe Beck – guitar
- George Benson – guitar, vocals
- Lou Blackburn – trombone
- Earl Bostic – sax
- George Braith – sax
- Zachary Breaux – guitar
- Bobby Broom – guitar
- Norman Brown
- Ray Bryant – piano
- Rusty Bryant
- Kenny Burrell – guitar
- Billy Butler
- Donald Byrd – trumpet

== C ==
- Terry Callier
- Ray Charles
- Arnett Cobb – sax
- Sonny Cox – sax
- Hank Crawford – sax
- The Crusaders
- King Curtis - sax

== D ==
- Eddie "Lockjaw" Davis – sax
- Wild Bill Davis – piano, organ
- Joey DeFrancesco – organ, trumpet
- Bill Doggett – piano, organ
- Lou Donaldson – sax
- George Duke – keys
- Cornell Dupree – guitar

== E ==
- Charles Earland

== F ==
- Wilton Felder
- Ronnie Foster
- George Freeman
- Funk, Inc.
- Maynard Ferguson – trumpet

== G ==
- Grant Green – guitar

== H ==
- Herbie Hancock – piano
- Eddie Harris
- Gene Harris
- Bill Heid
- Wayne Henderson
- Red Holloway – saxophone
- Ron Holloway – tenor saxophone
- Richard Holmes – organ
- Stix Hooper
- Freddie Hubbard – trumpet
- Bobbi Humphrey – flute

== J ==
- Fred Jackson – sax
- Willis Jackson – sax
- The J.B.'s
- Henry Johnson
- Plas Johnson
- Wayne Johnson – guitar
- Boogaloo Joe Jones – guitar
- Ronny Jordan – guitar

== K ==
- Rahsaan Roland Kirk – sax, flute
- Earl Klugh – guitar
- Charles Kynard – organ

== L ==
- Delvon Lamarr Organ Trio
- Ramsey Lewis – piano
- Bobby Lyle – piano
- Johnny Lytle

== M ==
- Harold Mabern – piano
- Junior Mance – piano
- Herbie Mann – sax, flute
- Hank Marr – organ
- Pat Martino – guitar
- Hugh Masekela – trumpet
- Les McCann – piano
- Jack McDuff – organ
- Jimmy McGriff – organ
- Big Jay McNeely – sax
- Charles Mingus
- Jackie Mittoo – organ
- Hank Mobley – sax
- Wes Montgomery – guitar
- Wild Bill Moore – sax
- Lee Morgan – trumpet
- Dick Morrissey – tenor/soprano sax
- Idris Muhammad – drums
- Ronald Muldrow – guitar

== N ==
- Oliver Nelson – sax
- David "Fathead" Newman – sax

== O ==
- Johnny O'Neal

== P ==
- Maceo Parker – sax
- John Patton – organ
- Duke Pearson – piano
- Houston Person – sax
- Sonny Phillips
- Trudy Pitts
- Jimmy Ponder
- Seldon Powell – sax, flute
- Pucho & His Latin Soul Brothers
- Bernard Purdie

== Q ==
- Ike Quebec – sax

== R ==
- Chuck Rainey – bass
- Joshua Redman – sax
- Freddie Roach – organ

== S ==
- Joe Sample – piano
- David Sanborn – sax
- Marlon Saunders – vocals
- Rhoda Scott – organ
- Shirley Scott – organ
- Horace Silver – piano
- Nina Simone – vocals
- Dr. Lonnie Smith – organ
- Jimmy Smith – organ
- Johnny "Hammond" Smith – organ
- Tab Smith – sax
- Melvin Sparks – guitar
- Leon Spencer – organ
- Sonny Stitt – sax
- Soulive

== T ==
- Grady Tate – drums
- Billy Taylor – piano
- The Three Sounds – piano, bass, drums
- Bobby Timmons – piano
- Stanley Turrentine – sax

== U ==
- James Ulmer – guitar

== V ==
- Harold Vick – sax, flute

== W ==
- Jr. Walker & the All Stars – sax
- Winston Walls – organ
- Grover Washington, Jr. – sax
- Mark Whitfield – guitar
- Don Wilkerson – sax
- Baby Face Willette – organ
- Jack Wilson – piano
- Reuben Wilson – organ

== Y ==
- Larry Young (jazz) – organ
- Young-Holt Unlimited – bass, drums

== Z ==
- Joe Zawinul – keyboards
