= Soul jazz =

Music genre

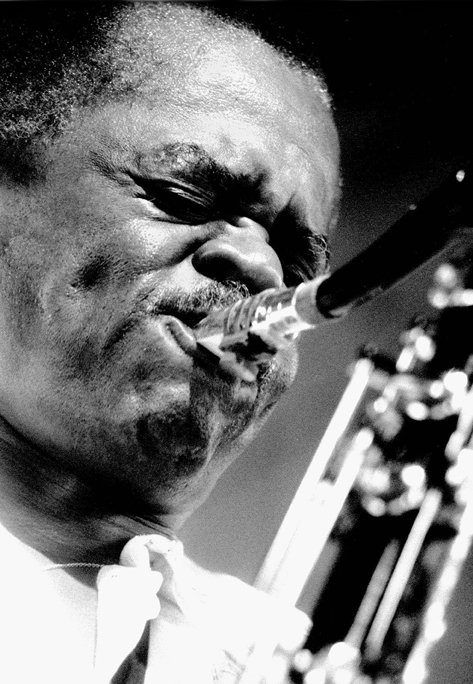
- Stanley Turrentine performing live in Half Moon Bay, California
- Stylistic origins: Hard bop; jazz; soul; blues; rhythm and blues; gospel
- Cultural origins: 1950s

Fusion genres
- Jazz-funk

Soul jazz or funky jazz is a subgenre of jazz that incorporates strong influences from hard bop, blues, soul, gospel and rhythm and blues. Soul jazz is often characterized by organ trios featuring the Hammond organs and small combos including saxophones, brass instruments, electric guitars, double basses, bass guitars, drums, pianos, vocals and electric organs. Its origins were in the 1950s and early 1960s, with its heyday with popular audiences preceding the rise of jazz fusion in the late 1960s and 1970s. Prominent names in fusion ranged from bop pianists including Bobby Timmons and Junior Mance to a wide range of organists, saxophonists, pianists, drummers and electric guitarists including Jack McDuff, Eddie "Lockjaw" Davis, and Grant Green.

== Musical style ==
Soul jazz is often associated with hard bop. Mark C. Gridley, writing for the All Music Guide to Jazz, explains that soul jazz more specifically refers to music with "an earthy, bluesy melodic concept" and "repetitive, dance-like rhythms.... Note that some listeners make no distinction between 'soul-jazz' and 'funky hard bop,' and many musicians don't consider 'soul-jazz' to be continuous with 'hard bop.'"

According to Nick Morrison, the subgenre "usually begins with the bass player" who "take[s] a strong bass line, establish[es] a steady groove between the bass and drums", before the band can "embellish that groove with riffs and melody lines".

Jazz pianist Horace Silver stated that "[f]unky means earthy and blues-based. It might not be blues itself, but it does have that 'down-home' feel to it. Soul is basically the same, but there's an added dimension of feeling and spirit."

== History ==
=== Origins ===
Roy Carr has described soul jazz as an outgrowth of hard bop, with the terms "funk" and "soul" appearing in a jazz context as early as the mid-1950s to describe "gospel-informed, down-home, call-and-response blues". Carr has also noted the influence of Ray Charles' small group recordings (which included saxophonists David "Fathead" Newman and Hank Crawford) on Horace Silver, Art Blakey, Cannonball Adderley. In his view, David Sanborn and Maceo Parker are in a line of alto saxophonists that includes Earl Bostic, Tab Smith, Adderley, and Lou Donaldson as the strongest links in the chain of the genre's evolution.

In the early to mid-1950s, after he left the Count Basie Orchestra, saxophonist Eddie "Lockjaw" Davis was among the first to form a jazz group with both organ and saxophone, first with Bill Doggett and later Shirley Scott. For this and his "full bodied yet reedy tone that was equally at home in rhythm & blues settings as more modern contexts," he "provided a link" between big band swing and soul jazz.

Soul jazz continued to develop in the late 1950s, reaching public awareness with the release of The Cannonball Adderley Quintet in San Francisco. Cannonball Adderley noted: "We were pressured quite heavily by Riverside Records when they discovered there was a word called 'soul'. We became, from an image point of view, soul jazz artists. They kept promoting us that way and I kept deliberately fighting it, to the extent that it became a game." Late 1950s, soul jazz artist Curtis Fuller recorded "Five Spot after Dark".

=== Mainstream ===
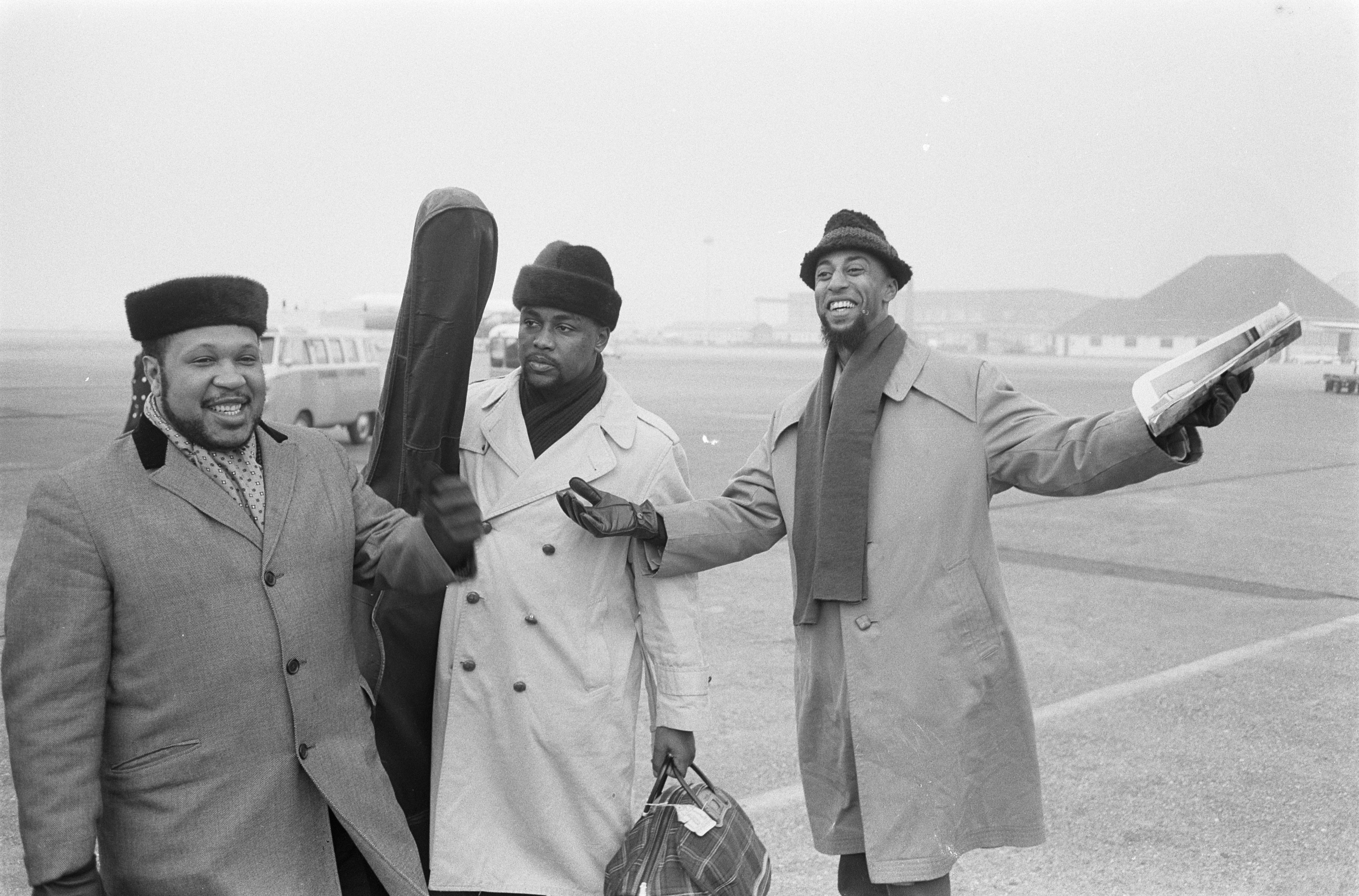
Les McCann Trio

Jimmy Smith's shift into soul jazz demonstrated the organ's potential within the genre with his albums Home Cookin' (1961) and Back at the Chicken Shack (1963). Other organists who recorded in the soul jazz genre during this period include Jack McDuff, Shirley Scott, and Charles Earland. With the addition of former bebop and hard-bop musicians to the genre, the number of musicians within various facets of the style increased as soul jazz became a subgenre in its own right; and like its bop predecessor, the new genre of jazz reworked popular songs, such as "Got My Mojo Workin'," while saxophone and trumpet players recently converted to the genre composed hits including "The Sidewinder", "Mercy, Mercy, Mercy" and "Listen Here" during the mid-1960s.

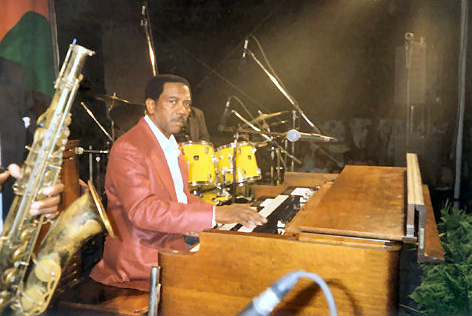
Jimmy Smith on a Hammond organ

An accelerating factor in soul jazz's development was the Black Power movement, which led African-American musicians to return to the African roots of their music. Tunes recorded within the genre, including "Mercy, Mercy, Mercy" and "Let My People Go" were direct references to the civil rights and Black Power movements. For instance, Adderley's music from the period has been described as containing an "irrepressible exuberance". Interest in the genre broadened when Adderley introduced Austrian-born keyboardist Joe Zawinul to soul jazz through his Quintet, with Zawinul contributing to its repertoire with his own compositions.

Likewise Stanley Turrentine, who began recording with Jimmy Smith in 1960 and rapidly expanded his audience, lamented the lack of jazz on radio and TV, saying that more people, and particularly African Americans, would have listened to soul jazz had it received as much exposure as rock music. The tenor saxophone player recorded a number of soul jazz albums throughout the 1960s, including Never Let Me Go (1963) with his wife Shirley Scott. Jazz critic Thom Jurek noted that on the recording "the organ acts as the testifying pulpit from which to speak, and Turrentine not only speaks, he weeps and whispers and wails." Turrentine's following album, A Chip Off the Old Block (1963), marked the first shift in influence, in this case from the swing/big band era with compositions by Count Basie and Neal Hefti. Turrentine's wife again contributed in addition to hard bop trumpeter Blue Mitchell. In the mid- to late-1960s, Turrentine evolved his soul jazz style from the small-group setting traditionally associated with the subgenre to an ensemble format, with Joyride (1965) arranged by fellow jazz saxophonist Oliver Nelson.

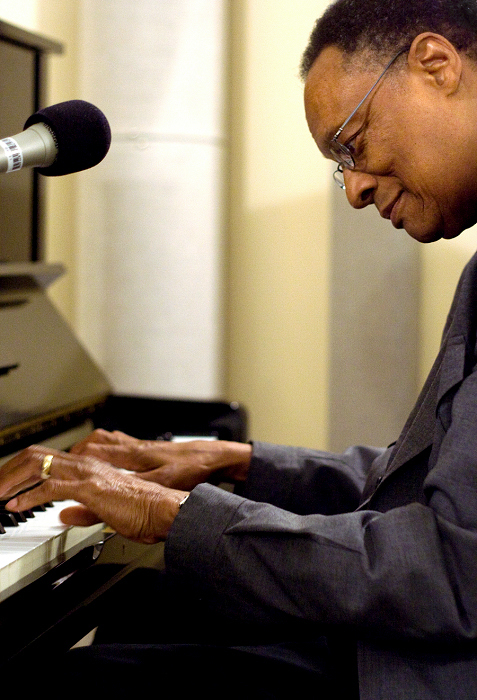
Ramsey Lewis

While Turrentine developed the core of the "soul" in soul jazz, Latin and funky influences developed soul jazz upon the foundation of bop. Pianist Herbie Hancock, for instance, was instrumental in pushing the boundaries of music theory and chord progressions during the 1960s. Hancock's first album Takin' Off (1962) featured the funky "Watermelon Man", a composition recorded by both Hancock and Mongo Santamaria, and was notable for "spare, funky piano riffing and tight, focused solo statements" that enabled Hancock to "begin pushing the boundaries of hard bop." The 1960s saw Hancock and trumpeter Lee Morgan's compositions be used in TV, with "Maiden Voyage" by Hancock appearing in a Fabergé commercial and Morgan's "The Sidewinder" in a Chrysler commercial. Popularizations of jazz compositions, such as the renditions of "Watermelon Man" by Santamaria and Gloria Lynne, went further to make soul jazz appealing to Black audiences, particularly in the early to mid-1960s, though this shifted over the course of the decade so much that by the late 1960s, the jazz musicians themselves were producing hit records, with six Jimmy Smith/Blue Note albums reaching the top 200. However, jazz labels such as Blue Note found it difficult to compete with larger record companies for advertising opportunities.

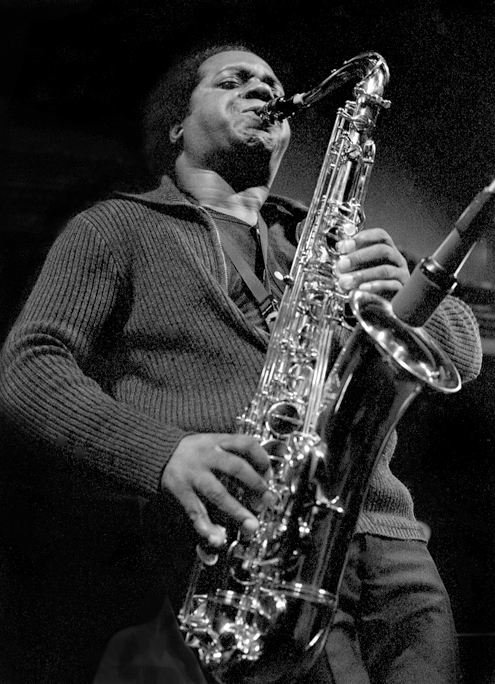
Saxophonist Eddie Harris

The growing popularity of soul jazz meant that, for many hard bop musicians, the shift from bop to soul jazz was not clearly defined, with Horace Silver releasing hard bop album The Jody Grind in 1966, and the more soul-influenced Serenade to a Soul Sister – starring Turrentine – in 1968. The latter album was described by Steve Huey as "one of the pianist's most infectiously cheerful, good-humored outings." Silver wrote in the album's liner notes that he believed his music should avoid "politics, hatred, or anger." Tenor saxophonist Hank Mobley took even longer to make the shift, playing primarily within the hard bop genre until 1968, when he recorded Reach Out! with a light soul jazz feel. His following album The Flip (1969) blended soul jazz and hard bop on its title track, according to Jurek. Other jazz artists, such as Lee Morgan, wavered in and out of the soul jazz genre. Drawing influence from the reliably hard bop Jazz Messengers, Morgan's albums of the mid-1960s could be described as both hard bop and soul jazz. Morgan hired bop musicians for the album but recorded soul-influenced material, for instance on the album Cornbread (1965).

Other soul jazz musicians had their roots almost entirely in soul and blues. Organist Jack McDuff, for example, was known for his particularly bluesy style, which enabled him to collaborate with young jazz talents including saxophonist Johnny Griffin and guitarist George Benson. McDuff's band focused on "groove-centric" music but in the later '60s experimented with popular songs and larger ensembles, particularly on his album Tobacco Road (1967). In contrast, former McDuff sideman and guitarist Pat Martino utilized an organ trio format during the late 1960s, with the live Young Guns (2014) album recorded at Club 118 in 1968 and 1969 featuring Gene Ludwig on organ and Randy Gelispie on drums.

Among the best-known soul jazz recordings from the era are Lee Morgan's The Sidewinder (1963), Frank Foster's Samba Blues (1963), Nat Adderley's "Work Song", Horace Silver's "Song for My Father" (1964), Ramsey Lewis's "The 'In' Crowd" (a top-five hit in 1965), Cannonball Adderley's "Mercy, Mercy, Mercy" (1966) (also popularized further when covered as a top-40 pop song by the Buckinghams the following year), and Young Holt Unlimited "Soulful Strut". Les McCann and Eddie Harris's album Swiss Movement (1969) was a hit record, as was the accompanying single "Compared to What", with both selling millions of units.

=== Fusion ===
Soul jazz began to mold into jazz fusion by the late 1960s, with musicians such as Turrentine moving to the CTI fusion label in the early 1970s and free jazz saxophonist Albert Ayler moving into jazz-rock during the late 1960s before his untimely death in 1970. With the temporary decline of Blue Note and the rapid rise of the CTI label, soul jazz moved toward smooth jazz and popular music of the day, with the label's founder Creed Taylor remarking that his original goal of creating jazz for listening had "backfired" into the development of background music.

Others pushed the boundaries of soul jazz to the extent it became fused with other genres. Tenor saxophonist Eddie Harris switched to the electric saxophone for his album titled The Electrifying Eddie Harris (1968). His experiments in "funk-influenced fusion, outside improvisations, bizarre electronic effects, new crossbreedings of traditional instruments, blues crooning, and even comedy," according to Steve Huey, "fell outside the bounds of what critics considered legitimate, serious jazz." He returned to bop late in his career.

== Legacy ==
Although soul jazz was most popular during the mid-to-late 1960s, its musicians and musical influences remained popular past this time period.

In the late 1960s and 1970s, the genre saw increased crossover with fusion. The Jazz Crusaders, for example, evolved from soul jazz to soul music, becoming the Crusaders in the process.

== See also ==
- List of jazz genres
- List of soul-jazz musicians
- Category:Soul-jazz musicians
