= Uncle G =

Uncle G may refer to:

- Uncle Grandpa, an American television series on Cartoon Network
- Randy Gelispie, a.k.a. Uncle G, a jazz musician and educator
