= Dennis Sandole =

American jazz guitarist and educator (1913–2000)

- Birth name: Dionigi Sandoli
- Born: September 29, 1913; Philadelphia, Pennsylvania, U.S.
- Died: September 30, 2000 (aged 87)
- Genres: Jazz
- Occupations: Musician; composer; educator
- Instrument: Guitar

Dennis Sandole (born Dionigi Sandoli; September 29, 1913 – September 30, 2000) was an American jazz guitarist, composer, and music educator from Philadelphia.

== Biography ==
Sandole was John Coltrane's mentor from 1946 until the early 1950s, introducing him to music theory beyond chords and scales and exposing him to the music of other cultures. Sandole taught advanced harmonic techniques that were applicable to any instrument, using exotic scales and creating his own.

He taught privately until the end of his life. His students included saxophonists James Moody, Benny Golson, Michael Brecker, Rob Brown, and Bobby Zankel; trumpeter Art Farmer; pianists Matthew Shipp and Sumi Tonooka; guitarists Bruce Eisenbeil, Jim Hall, Joe Diorio, Pat Martino, Frank Gerard, Jon Herington, Bob DeVos, Harry Leahey, and Rufus Harley.

Sandole recorded Modern Music from Philadelphia with his brother, Adolf Sandole (1922–1959), which was released by Fantasy Records in 1956 and credited to The Sandole Brothers.

== Death and interment ==
Sandole died on September 30, 2000, in Philadelphia, Pennsylvania and was interred at West Laurel Hill Cemetery.
