= Cookman =

Cookman is a surname. Notable people with the surname include:

- Brian Cookman (1946–2005), English musician and composer, magazine designer and artist, and tai chi practitioner
- Donald Cookman, Democratic politician who served in the West Virginia Senate
- George Cookman Sturgiss (1842–1925), lawyer and Republican politician from West Virginia
- George Grimston Cookman (1801–1841), British-born American Methodist clergyman who served as Chaplain of the Senate
- John Cookman (1909–1982), American ice hockey player who competed in the 1932 Winter Olympics
- Joseph Cookman (1899–1944), American journalist, writer, critic and a founder of The Newspaper Guild
- William Holmes Cookman (1867–1950), American architect who was an engineer of the Pennsylvania Railroad

== See also ==
- Bethune–Cookman University, private historically black university in Daytona Beach, Florida
- Bethune–Cookman Wildcats, college sports teams at Bethune-Cookman University in Daytona Beach, Florida
- List of Bethune-Cookman University alumni
- Darnell-Cookman School of the Medical Arts, located in downtown Jacksonville, Florida, USA, across from Shands Hospital
