= List of Bethune–Cookman University alumni =

This is a list of Bethune-Cookman University alumni. Bethune-Cookman University is a historically black university located in Daytona Beach, Florida.

== Business ==
Name	Class year	Notability	References
Marjorie Joyner	1973	Inventor of the permanent wave machine	

== Community service and civil rights ==
Name	Class year	Notability	References
Dr. Matthew J. Gillespie	2012	CEO of the Mary McLeod Bethune Educational Legacy Foundation, Inc.	
Henry Lyons	1964	Former President of the National Baptist Convention, USA, Inc.	
Harry T. Moore	1936	Civil rights leader; state secretary in Florida for the NAACP in the 1940s and 1950s; the first NAACP official murdered in the civil rights struggle	
Lucille O'Neal	2003	Mother of former NBA player Shaquille O'Neal; longtime supporter of the Bethune-Cookman University School of Nursing	
A. Philip Randolph	1907	Civil rights leader; attended the Cookman Institute, before it merged with Daytona Educational and Industrial Training School and became Bethune-Cookman	

== Education ==
Name	Class year	Notability	References
Oswald P. Bronson, Sr.		Former president of Bethune-Cookman, 1975-2004 and Edward Waters College, 2005-2007	
Gregory Drane	2002	Current director of athletic bands at Pennsylvania State University	
Yvonne Scarlett-Golden		Educator and activist; the first African American mayor of Daytona Beach, Florida, elected in 2003	

== Entertainment ==
Name	Class year	Notability	References
Allen & Allen		Gospel musicians and pastors	
Rodney Chester		Actor from the Logo Network TV show Noah's Arc	
Jimmy "Bo" Horne	1971	Disco recording artist	

== Modeling ==
Name / Class year / Notability / References; Nakera Simms-Symonette / / Model; Miss Bahamas 2000; contestant in 2000 Miss Universe Pageant

== Politics ==
Name	Class year	Notability	Reference(s)
James Bush III	1979	Former member of the Florida House of Representatives District 109	
James Dean	1876	First African-American judge in Florida; attended the Cookman Institute before the merger in which it became Bethune–Cookman	
James V. Pierce	1980	Judge, 6th Judicial Circuit Court of Florida, Pinellas County, Florida, 2006–present	
William H. Turner	1956	First African-American chairperson of the Miami-Dade County School Board; member of the Florida Senate, 1992-1998	

== Athletics ==
Name	Class year	Notability	Reference(s)
Terry Anderson		Former NFL player	
Stevie Baggs		Former NFL and Canadian Football League player	
Rudy Barber		Former American Football League player	
Sebastien Boucher		Former Minor League baseball prospect	
Kevin Bradshaw		NCAA basketball record-holder for points in a single game, player in the Israeli Basketball Premier League	
John Chaney	1955	Former men's head basketball coach at Temple University	
Rickey Claitt		Former NFL player	
Boobie Clark		Former NFL player, running back for the Cincinnati Bengals and Houston Oilers; 1973 AFC Rookie of the Year	
Nick Collins	2005	Former NFL player	
Damion Cook		Former NFL player	
Ryan Davis		Former NFL player	
Kevin Ferguson, aka Kimbo Slice	attended	Street fighter and mixed martial arts fighter	
Andrew Hinson	1955	Former head football coach at Bethune-Cookman	
Stan Jefferson	attended, but transferred	Former Major League Baseball player	
Eric Lewis		Former NBA referee	
Larry Little	1967	Former NFL offensive guard, a member of the Pro Football Hall of Fame, played on Miami Dolphins Super Bowl champion teams; former head football coach at Bethune-Cookman	
Rashean Mathis	2003	Former NFL cornerback	
Cy McClairen	1953	First Bethune-Cookman alumnus in National Football League who played tight end for five seasons; served as head football coach, head basketball coach, and athletics director at Bethune-Cookman	
Maulty Moore		Former NFL player	
Aulcie Perry		Former professional basketball player	
Clifford Reed		Former head men's basketball coach at Bethune-Cookman	
Booker Reese		Former NFL player	
Charles Riggins		Former NFL player	
Jerry Simmons		Former NFL player	
T. T. Toliver		Current Arena Football League player	
Eric Weems	2007	Former NFL wide receiver	
Lee Williams		Former American Football League player	
Mark Woodyard		Former Major League Baseball player	
Alvin Wyatt	1970	Former NFL player and former head football coach at Bethune-Cookman	
