= Living Room (Mark Murphy album) =

1984 studio album by Mark Murphy

- Cover photography by Eddie O'Sullivan

Studio album by Mark Murphy
- Released: 1985
- Recorded: December 20–21, 1984
- Studios: Van Gelder Studio, Englewood Cliffs, NJ
- Genre: Vocal jazz
- Length: 38:21
- Label: Muse Records
- Producers: David Braham, Mark Murphy

Mark Murphy chronology
Mark Murphy Sings Nat's Choice: The Nat King Cole Songbook, Volume Two (1983)	Living Room (1985)	Beauty and the Beast (1986)

Living Room is a 1984 studio album by Mark Murphy.

Living Room is the 23rd album by American jazz vocalist Mark Murphy. It was recorded when Murphy was 52 years old and released by the Muse Records label in the United States in 1985. This often overlooked recording is a collection of jazz tunes and standards with Murphy backed by a six piece band. Murphy contributes a composition, "Full Moon".

== Background ==
Murphy had completed a two album tribute to Nat King Cole the prior year, which was a collection of duets between Murphy and various instruments. For Living Room he assembled a sextet for accompaniment and recorded tunes by jazz composers including the title track by Abbey Lincoln and Max Roach, Dave Frishberg's "Our Love Rolls On" from The Dave Frishberg Songbook, and a medley of songs about Los Angeles by Med Flory, Larry Marks, and Ray Linn. Murphy had established a tradition of including a comedy tune on each album and here it's "Ain’t Nobody Here but Us Chickens", a hit record for Louis Jordan. The standard "There’ll Be Some Changes Made", which was a Sophie Tucker hit, Lambert, Hendricks and Ross' "Charleston Alley", and a medley of Erroll Garner's "Misty" and Johnny Mercer's "Midnight Sun" are included. Murphy contributed an original composition, "Full Moon" and covered the more recent "Maxine" by Donald Fagin from The Nightfly from 1982.

== Recording ==
Keyboardist David Braham plays on the recording and also produced the album with Mark Murphy. Braham had previously appeared on Muse releases by Houston Person (Heavy Juice) and Johnny Lytle (Good Vibes). Grady Tate and Ed Caccavale play drums on the album. Grady Tate plays on five of the tracks and also contributes vocals on the "Misty / Midnight Sun" medley. A legendary jazz drummer, Tate had played frequently with Peggy Lee. Gene Lees wrote in a 1963 DownBeat feature on Murphy, "The singer who has most influenced Murphy, by his own reckoning, is Peggy Lee". Murphy told Lees, "She has such a creative approach through the lyrics as opposed to Sarah Vaughan’s creative approach through the music. Peggy is always creative: she never stops experimenting and trying out things. That's one reason she's never a bore. She’s inconsistent but never dull".

Gerry Niewood, from Chuck Mangione's band, plays tenor saxophone on the album and flute on Murphy's own composition, "Full Moon". Harry Leahey, a former member of Phil Woods' Quintet, plays guitar with a solo on "Our Love Rolls On". Ted Curson from Charles Mingus' band plays trumpet and Lawrence Killian accompanies on percussion.

Professional ratings
Review scores
Source	Rating
AllMusic	4/5 stars

== Reception ==
AllMusic rated Living Room with 4 stars.

Murphy biographer Peter Jones includes the album in his list of top ten essential Mark Murphy albums, writing, "It is one of the hippest things he ever recorded". He also listed "Living Room" (track 1) as part of his article10 tracks by Mark Murphy I Can’t Do Without… in the London Jazz News series "10 Tracks I Can't Do Without", saying it is a "sleek, finger-snappin’ Abbey Lincoln/Max Roach tune that shows how great Mark was at simply riding the beat and inserting little syncopations of his own. The track features David Braham’s organ and fills from Gerry Niewood’s tenor, with cool solos from each, enlivened by Larry Killian’s congas".

== Track listing ==
Side A

1. "Living Room" (Abbey Lincoln, Max Roach) – 5:30
2. "Our Love Rolls On" (Dave Frishberg) – 4:07
3. "L.A. Song Cycle": "L.A." / "L.A. Breakdown" / "The Way It Was In L.A." (Med Flory / Larry Marks / Ray Linn)– 5:55
4. "There’ll Be Some Changes Made" (W. Benton Overstreet, Billy Higgins) – 3:35

Side B

1. "Ain’t Nobody Here but Us Chickens" (Alex Kramer, Joan Whitney) – 5:22
2. "Misty" / "Midnight Sun" (Erroll Garner, Johnny Burke / Johnny Mercer, Sonny Burke, Lionel Hampton) – 5:56
3. "Charleston Alley" (Jon Hendricks, Leroy Kirkland, Hamish Henderson) – 2:39
4. "Full Moon" (Mark Murphy)– 2:42
5. "Maxine" (Donald Fagen) – 2:35

== Personnel ==
Performance

- Mark Murphy – vocals
- Jimmy Lewis – bass (track B2)
- Ed Caccavale – drums (tracks A1, A4, B3–B4)
- Grady Tate – drums (tracks A2–A3, B1–B2, B5)
- David Braham – keyboard
- Gerry Niewood – tenor saxophone, flute
- Harry Leahey – guitar
- Lawrence Killian – percussion
- Ted Curson – trumpet, flugelhorn

Production

- Rudy van Gelder – mastering, engineer, Van Gelder Studio
- David Braham – producer
- Mark Murphy – producer
- Eddie O'Sullivan – cover photography
- Dick Smith – album design
- Bill Klewitz – photography
- Tony Cennamo – liner notes
