= Bob DeVos =

American jazz guitarist (born 1946)

- Born: Robert W. DeVos; 1946 (age 79–80); Paterson, New Jersey, U.S.
- Genre: Jazz
- Occupations: Musician, educator
- Instrument: Guitar
- Years active: 1970–present
- Label: Savant
- Website: bobdevosjazzguitar.com

Bob DeVos (born 1946) is an American jazz guitarist.

== Career ==
DeVos's style combines blues, rhythm and blues, and jazz. "I wanted to play like B.B. King and Chuck Berry", DeVos said. At twelve, he began playing guitar, listening to and learning solos from his brother's R&B records. He took lessons from Joe Cinderella. In high school he became interested in jazz after hearing albums by organist Jimmy Smith with guitarist Kenny Burrell and the album The Incredible Jazz Guitar of Wes Montgomery. After graduating high school he continued his guitar studies with Harry Leahey and then Dennis Sandole.

In 1969 he got a job with Trudy Pitts, after it was vacated by Pat Martino, and toured extensively. His recording career began with a 1970 music session. Beginning in the late 1970s, he was a member of bands led by Richard "Groove" Holmes, Gerry Niewood, Teo Macero, Jimmy McGriff & Hank Crawford, and Charles Earland. Earland produced his first album for Savant. He has also performed with Harry Allen, Freddy Cole, Junior Cook, Joey DeFrancesco, Kenny Drew Jr., Etta Jones, Gene Ludwig, Ron McClure, David "Fathead" Newman, Greg Osby, Houston Person, Irene Reid, Dr. Lonnie Smith, Sonny Stitt, Stanley Turrentine.

DeVos is an adjunct professor at the private college Lehigh University. He was the musical director for the Organ Summit Supreme in 2005 in Newark, New Jersey, featuring organists Jimmy McGriff, Dr. Lonnie Smith, Trudy Pitts and Gene Ludwig.

== Discography ==
=== As leader ===
- Breaking the Ice (Savant, 1999) with Charles Earland
- DeVos' Groove Guitar! (Blues Leaf, 2003) with Gene Ludwig, Billy James
- Shifting Sands (Savant, 2006) with Eric Alexander
- Playing for Keeps (Savant, 2007) with Eric Alexander
- Shadow Box (American Showplace Music, 2013) with Ralph Bowen
- Six String Solos (American Showplace Music, 2016)

=== As sideman ===
- Charles Earland, Blowing the Blues Away (HighNote, 1997)
- Charles Earland, Charles Earland Live (Cannonball, 1999)
- Onaje Allan Gumbs, Sack Full of Dreams (18th & Vine, 2007)
- Richard "Groove" Holmes, Good Vibrations (Muse, 1980)
- Gene Ludwig, The Groove ORGANization (Blues Leaf, 2002) with Billy James
- Gene Ludwig Trio with Bill Warfield Big Band, Duff's Blues (18th & Vine, 2008)
- Teo Macero, Impressions of Charles Mingus (Palo Alto, 1983)
- Ron McClure, Match Point (SteepleChase, 2002)
- Ron McClure, Age of Peace (SteepleChase, 2003)
- Irene Reid, Million Dollar Secret (Savant, 1997)
- Irene Reid, I Ain't Doing Too Bad (Savant, 1999)
- Vince Seneri, Urban Paradise (Senful/Orchard, 2003)
- Vince Seneri, Street Talk (Senful/Orchard, 2005)
- Tyrone Smith, Playing It By Ear (18th & Vine, 2010)
- Akiko Tsuruga, Sakura (American Showplace Music, 2011)
- Reuben Wilson Trio, Revisited (American Showplace Music, 2011)
