= Hard bop =

Subgenre of jazz music

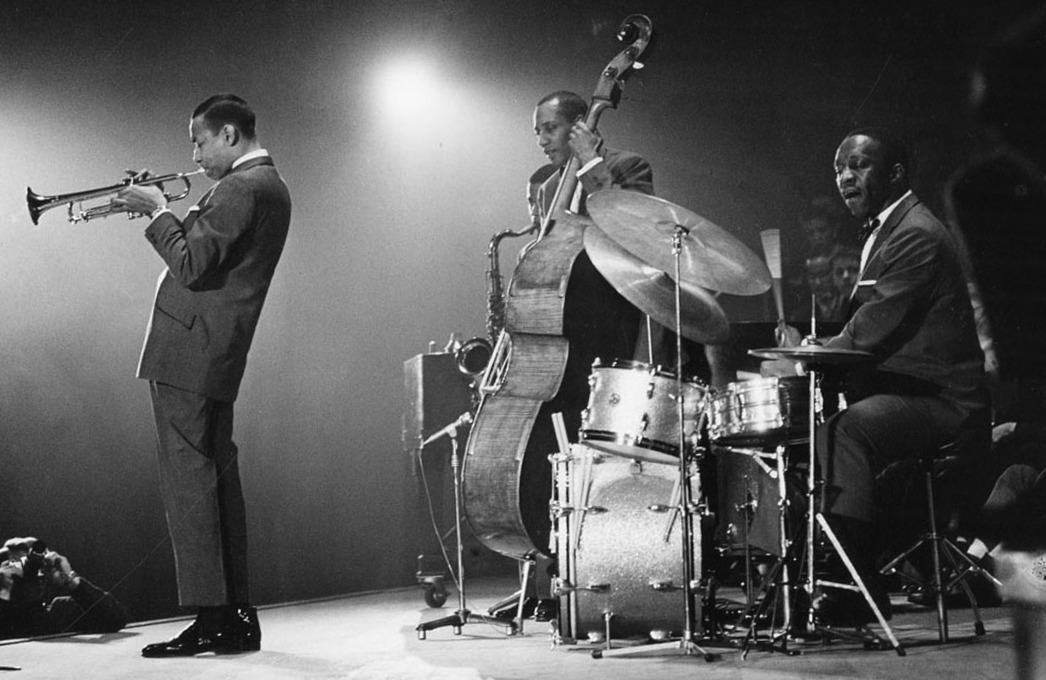
- Art Blakey and the Jazz Messengers, 1960. Pictured are Lee Morgan (left), Jymie Merritt (center), and Art Blakey (right) (saxophonist Wayne Shorter stands mostly hidden behind Merritt).
- Stylistic origins: Jazz; blues; bebop; rhythm and blues; gospel music
- Cultural origins: 1950s in New York City and Detroit
- Derivative forms: Soul jazz; post-bop; straight-ahead jazz; neo-bop jazz

Other topics
- List of hard bop musicians

Hard bop is a subgenre of jazz that is an extension of bebop. Journalists and record companies began using the term in the mid-1950s to describe a new current within jazz that incorporated influences from rhythm and blues, gospel music, and blues, especially in saxophone and piano playing.

David H. Rosenthal contends in his book Hard Bop that the genre is, to a large degree, the natural creation of a generation of African-American musicians who grew up at a time when bebop and rhythm and blues were the dominant forms of black American music. Prominent hard bop musicians included Horace Silver, Clifford Brown, Charles Mingus, Art Blakey, Cannonball Adderley, Miles Davis, John Coltrane, Hank Mobley, Sonny Clark, Thelonious Monk, Lee Morgan, Wes Montgomery, and Pat Martino.

== Characteristics ==
Hard bop is sometimes referred to as "funky hard bop". The "funky" label refers to the rollicking, rhythmic feeling associated with the style. The descriptor is also used to describe soul jazz, which is commonly associated with hard bop. According to Mark C. Gridley, soul jazz more specifically refers to music with "an earthy, bluesy melodic concept and ... repetitive, dance-like rhythms. Some listeners make no distinction between 'soul-jazz' and 'funky hard bop,' and many musicians don't consider 'soul-jazz' to be continuous with 'hard bop.'" The term "soul" suggests the church, and traditional gospel elements such as the plagal cadence seemed to suddenly appear in jazz during the era. Amiri Baraka noted a combination of "wider and harsher tones" with "accompanying piano chords [that] became more basic and simplified" in this era. He cited saxophonist Sonny Rollins' playing as one of the best examples of the style. Jazz critic Scott Yanow distinguished hard bop from the broader world of bop by saying that "[t]empos could be just as blazing but the melodies were generally simpler, the musicians (particularly the saxophonists and pianists) tended to be familiar with (and open to the influence of) rhythm & blues and the bass players (rather than always being stuck in the role of a metronome) were beginning to gain a little more freedom and solo space."

Hard bop has been seen by some critics as a response to cool jazz and West Coast jazz. Paul Tanner, Maurice Gerow, and David Megill write, "the hard bop school ... saw the new instrumentation and compositional devices used by cool musicians as gimmicks rather than valid developments of the jazz tradition." However, Shelly Manne suggested that cool jazz and hard bop simply reflected their respective geographic environments: the relaxed cool jazz style reflected a more relaxed lifestyle in California, while driving bop typified the hectic atmosphere of New York City. James Lincoln Collier suggests the style was an attempt to recapture jazz as a form of African-American expression. Whether or not this was the intent, many musicians quickly adopted the style, regardless of race.

== History ==
=== Origins ===
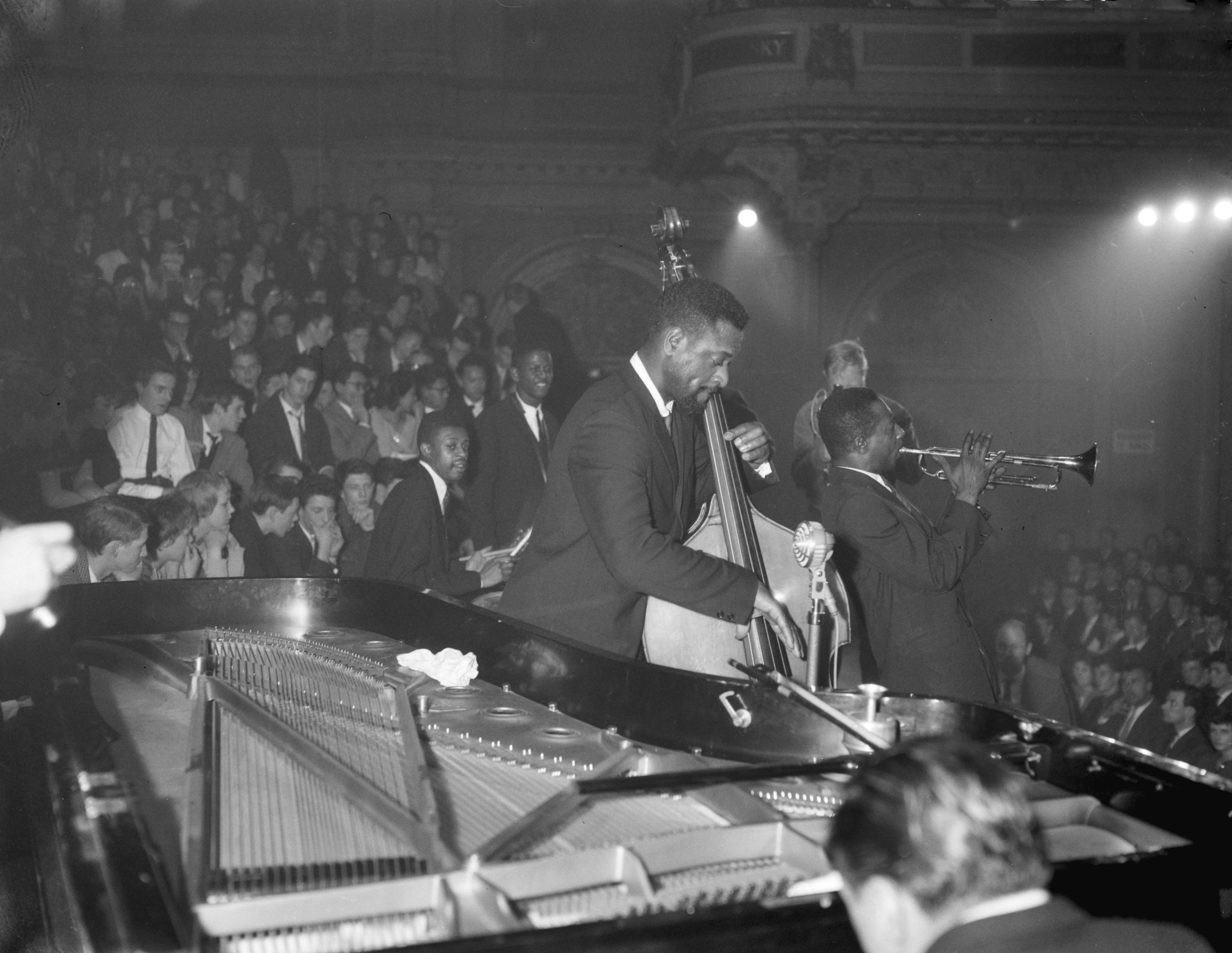
Horace Silver Quintet in Amsterdam, 1959

According to Nat Hentoff in his 1957 liner notes for the Art Blakey album Hard Bop, the phrase was originated by music critic and pianist John Mehegan, jazz reviewer of the New York Herald Tribune at that time. Hard bop first developed in the mid-1950s, and is generally seen as originating with the Jazz Messengers, a group led by Blakey. Alternatively, Anthony Macias points to Detroit as an early center in the rise of bop and hard bop, noting the influence of Detroit musicians Barry Harris and Kenny Burrell and the fact that Miles Davis lived in the city from 1953 to 1954. Billy Mitchell, a tenor saxophone player, organized a band that played at the Blue Bird Inn in Detroit during the early 1950s that "anchored the city's Jazz scene" and attracted hard bop musicians to the city.

Michael Cuscuna maintains that Silver and Blakey's efforts were in response to the New York bebop scene:

Both Art and Horace were very, very aware of what they wanted to do. They wanted to get away from the jazz scene of the early '50s, which was the Birdland scene—you hire Phil Woods or Charlie Parker or J. J. Johnson, they come and sit in with the house rhythm section, and they only play blues and standards that everybody knows. There's no rehearsal, there's no thought given to the audience. Both Horace and Art knew that the only way to get the jazz audience back and make it bigger than ever was to really make music that was memorable and planned, where you consider the audience and keep everything short. They really liked digging into blues and gospel, things with universal appeal. So they put together what was to be called the Jazz Messengers.

David Rosenthal sees the development of hard bop as a response to both a decline in bebop and the rise of rhythm and blues:

The early fifties saw an extremely dynamic Rhythm and Blues scene take shape .... This music, and not cool jazz, was what chronologically separated bebop and hard bop in ghettos. Young jazz musicians, of course, enjoyed and listened to these R & B sounds which, among other things, began the amalgam of blues and gospel that would later be dubbed 'soul music.' And it is in this vigorously creative black pop music, at a time when bebop seemed to have lost both its direction and its audience, that some of hard bop's roots may be found.

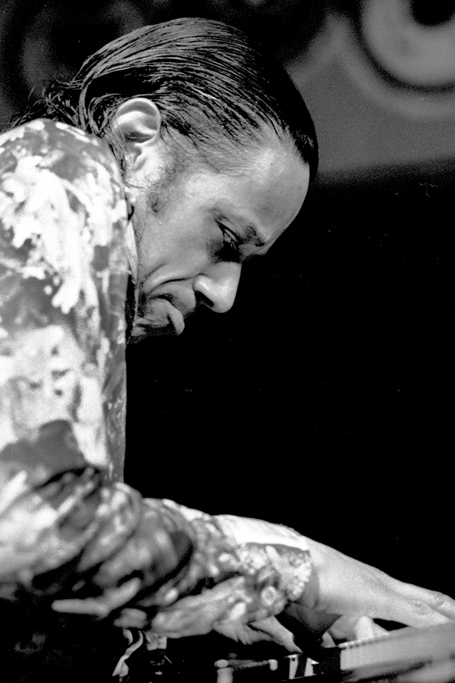
Horace Silver

A key recording in the early development of hard bop was Silver's composition "The Preacher", which was considered "old-timey" or "corny", such that Blue Note head Alfred Lion was hesitant to record the song. However, the song became a hit.

Miles Davis, who had performed the title track of his album Walkin' at the inaugural Newport Jazz Festival in 1954, would form the Miles Davis Quintet with John Coltrane in 1955, becoming prominent in hard bop before moving on to other styles. Other early documents were the two volumes of the Blue Note albums A Night at Birdland, also from 1954, recorded by the Blakey's quintet at Birdland months before the Davis set at Newport. Clifford Brown, the trumpeter on the Birdland albums, formed the Brown–Roach Quintet with drummer Max Roach. Among the pianists in the band were Richie Powell and Carl Perkins, both of whom died at a young age.

=== Mainstream ===
David Ake notes that by the mid-1950s, "the bop world clearly was not the 'closed' circle it had been in its earliest days." This coincided with a competitive spirit among bop musicians to play with "virtuousity and complexity", along with what Ake calls "jazz masculinity." The broadening influence of hard bop coincided with a generation of jazz pianists who rose to prominence in the late 1950s – among them Tommy Flanagan, Kenny Drew, and Wynton Kelly – who took "altered" approaches to bebop. Although these musicians did not work exclusively or specifically within hard bop, their association with hard bop saxophone players put them within the genre's broader circle. West Coast Jazz's diminishing influence during the late 1950s accelerated hard bop's rise to prominence, while the transition to 33 rpm records facilitated the shifts toward longer solos that were typical of hard bop albums. During a fifteen-year stretch from 1952 to 1967, Blue Note Records recruited musicians and promoted hard bop described by Yanow as "classy."

A critical album that cemented hard bop's mainstream presence in jazz was A Blowin' Session (1957), including saxophonists Johnny Griffin, John Coltrane, and Hank Mobley; trumpeter Lee Morgan; pianist Wynton Kelly; bassist Paul Chambers; and Art Blakey. Described by Al Campbell as "one of the greatest hard bop jam sessions ever recorded" and "filled with infectious passion and camaraderie", it was the only studio session ever recorded including all three saxophonists. It cemented "Coltrane's ability to navigate complex chord changes over a fast tempo" and is associated with Griffin's reputation as "the world's fastest saxophonist". In 1956, The Jazz Messengers recorded an album titled Hard Bop, which was released in 1957, including Bill Hardman on trumpet and saxophonist Jackie McLean, with a mix of hard bop compositions and jazz standards. Shortly after, in 1958, The Jazz Messengers, with a new line-up including Lee Morgan on trumpet and Benny Golson on saxophone, recorded the quintessential hard bop album Moanin', with the album pioneering in soul jazz. Golson and Morgan formed their own bands and produced further records in the hard bop genre: Golson's Jazztet with Art Farmer on trumpet recorded the album Meet the Jazztet in 1960, which was given a five-star rating by AllMusic, and Morgan explored hard bop and sister genres in records like The Sidewinder, known for its "funky, danceable groov[e] that drew from soul-jazz, Latin boogaloo, blues, and R&B." Morgan's albums attracted rising stars in the jazz world, particularly saxophonists Joe Henderson and Wayne Shorter; Morgan formed a "long-standing partnership" with the latter.

Meanwhile, in the late 1950s to early 1960s John Coltrane was a prominent saxophonist within the hard bop genre, with albums such as Blue Train and Giant Steps exemplifying his ability to play within this style. His album Stardust (1958), for instance, included on trumpet a young Freddie Hubbard, who would go on to become "a hard bop stylist." Blue Train was described by Richard Havers as "Coltrane's Hard-Bop Masterpiece", although an edit made to one of the album's tracks caused controversy following disapproval from sound engineer Rudy Van Gelder. In the early to mid-1960s, prior to his death, Coltrane experimented in free jazz but again drew influences from hard bop in his 1965 album A Love Supreme. Coltrane was a longtime member of Miles Davis' band, which bridged the gap between hard bop and modal jazz with albums such as Milestones and Kind of Blue. These albums represented a transition toward more experimental jazz, but Davis maintained core ideas of hard bop, such as the "call-and-response theme" found on one of Kind of Blue's best-known tracks, "So What". The earlier album Milestones was described as "indebted to hard bop" due to its "fast speeds, angular phrases and driving rhythms".

In the early 1960s, Joe Henderson formed a band with Kenny Dorham, which recorded for Blue Note Records, and played extensively as a sideman in the bands of Horace Silver and Herbie Hancock; however, he received less recognition after he moved to San Francisco and began recording for Milestone. Other hard bop musicians went to Europe, such as pianist Bud Powell (elder brother of Richie Powell) in 1959 and saxophonist Dexter Gordon in 1962. Powell, a bebop pianist, continued to record albums in the early 1960s, while Gordon's Our Man in Paris became "one of his most iconic albums" for Blue Note.

Other musicians who contributed to the hard bop style include Donald Byrd, Tina Brooks, Sonny Clark, Lou Donaldson, Blue Mitchell, Sonny Rollins, and Sonny Stitt.

David Rosenthal considers six albums among the high points of the hard bop era: Ugetsu, Kind of Blue, Saxophone Colossus, Let Freedom Ring, Mingus Ah Um, and Brilliant Corners, referring to these as being some of the genre's "masterpieces".

=== Decline and revival ===
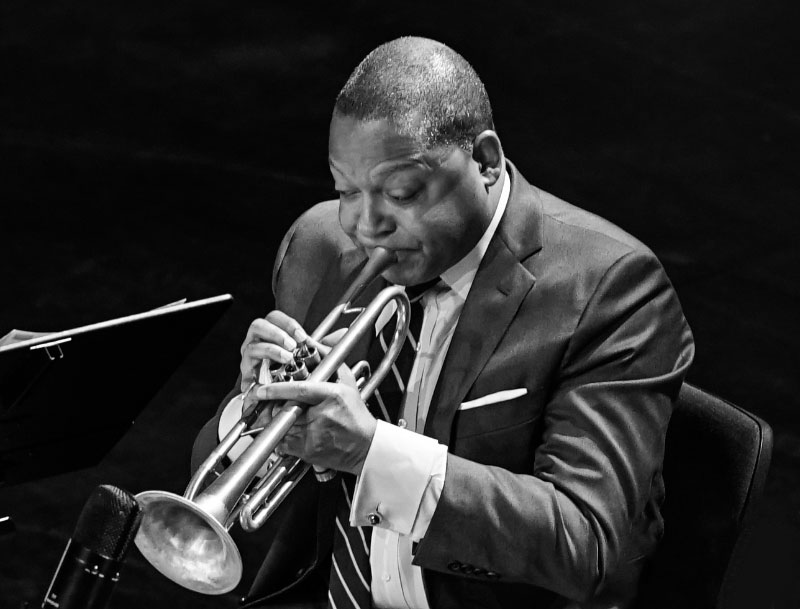
Wynton Marsalis, an important figure in the revival of bop

Scott Yanow described hard bop in the late 1960s as "running out of gas." Blue Note Records' sale and decline in the late 1960s and early 1970s, combined with the rapid ascendance of soul jazz and jazz fusion, largely replaced hard bop's prevalence within jazz, although bop would see a major revival in the 1980s (neo-bop). Yanow also attributes hard bop's temporary decline in the 1970s to "[t]he rise of commercial rock and the consolidation of most of the independent record labels." With rock groups such as the Beatles capturing hard bop's charisma and avant-garde jazz bringing "division and controversy into the jazz community," Miles Davis and other former hard boppers left the genre. Davis led other jazz musicians toward the fusion genre, particularly other trumpet players. For example, Donald Byrd's shift toward commercial fusion and smooth jazz recordings of the early 1970s, while celebrated within some circles, was considered a "betrayal" by fans of hard bop. His album Black Byrd (1973), Blue Note's most successful album, neared the #1 spot on the R&B charts despite the opposition of jazz purists.

In 1985, the filmed concert One Night with Blue Note brought together thirty predominantly hard bop musicians including Art Blakey, Ron Carter, Johnny Griffin, and Freddie Hubbard. Following fusion's decline, younger musicians started a bop revival known as neo-bop, the best-known proponent of this being trumpeter Wynton Marsalis. The revival was a "resurgence" by the 1990s, and by the 1990s, hard bop's revival had become so prominent that Yanow referred to it as "the foundation of modern acoustic jazz." Veteran saxophonist Joe Henderson, for instance, was described by Yanow as a "national celebrity and a constant poll winner" in jazz circles after signing to Verve in the 1990s, largely due to changes in marketing.

== Legacy ==
Rosenthal observed that "[t]he years 1955 to 1965 represent the last period in which jazz effortlessly attracted the hippiest young black musicians, the most musically advanced, those with the most solid technical skills and the strongest sense of themselves, not only as entertainers but as artists." In the same text he laments hard bop's "many detractors and few articulate defenders," describing some of the comments made by its critics as "derogatory cliches." Alternatively, Yanow suggests a slightly longer period, from 1955 to 1968, during which hard bop was "the most dominant jazz style."

Although the hard bop style enjoyed its greatest popularity in the 1950s and 1960s, hard bop performers and elements of the music remain present in jazz.

== See also ==
- List of hard bop musicians
