= Allen & Allen =

American gospel jazz-funk duo (1994–2007)

- Origin: Daytona Beach, Florida
- Genres: gospel, urban contemporary gospel, Jazz-funk, Soul jazz
- Years active: 1994–2007
- Labels: Light, CGI, Platinum, Allen & Allen
- Members: Bruce Allen; Allen Wiggins

Allen & Allen are an American urban contemporary gospel jazz-funk and soul jazz African-American music duo from Daytona Beach, Florida, and they started their music recording careers in 1994. The duo released seven albums with four labels, and five of those albums charted on the Billboard magazine Gospel Albums chart.

== Background ==
The two soon-to-be preachers met, while they were in school at Bethune-Cookman University located in Daytona Beach, Florida. Bishop Bruce Allen was graduating at the time Bishop Allen Wiggins was entering the college in the early 1990s. Bruce is a keyboardist, while Wiggins is a saxophonist, and they formed the urban contemporary gospel music duo, Allen & Allen. Bishop Bruce Vincent Allen is the senior pastor of The Church Fellowship located in Jacksonville, Florida, who was raised in East St. Louis, Illinois, before moving to Florida for college.

He is married to First Lady Annie Renita Allen (née Mercer), who were wed on December 3, 1997. Bishop Allen Thompson Dixon Wiggins Sr. is the senior pastor of The Hope Church located in Orlando, Florida, who was raised there as well by his parents Reverend Dr. R.W. and Beulah Wiggins. He is married to First Lady Deborah Denise Wiggins, which they have five children, Michael, Brandy, Julian, Allen II, and Jonathan.

== History ==
The African-American urban contemporary gospel music duos music recording career commenced in 1994, with the album, Allen & Allen, and it was released by Light Records in 1994. This album was coincidentally their breakthrough release upon the Billboard magazine Gospel Albums chart, placing at a peak of No. 20. They released two albums by CGI Records in 1995, with the first A-Blazing Grace, and the second a Christmas album, Christmas Like Never Before, both of those placing at their peaks of Nos. 29 and 31 respectively on the aforementioned chart. Their subsequent album, Come Sunday, was released in 1996 by Platinum Entertainment, and this again placed at a peak of No. 17 on the Gospel Albums chart. They released, A New Beginning, in 1998 with CGI Records, however it failed to chart. Their next album, Love Sweet Love, was released by them in 2001, and it placed at a peak of 31 on the aforementioned chart, while peaking at No. 14 on the Top Contemporary Jazz Albums chart. They released, Impressions, in 2003, yet this did not chart.

The collaboration came to an end in 2007, when Bruce Allen suffered a stroke. He worked at his recovery through the years, and in 2024 released his own five-song EP, Come Back.

== Members ==
- Bishop Bruce Vincent Allen (born March 1, 1962)
- Bishop Allen Thompson Dixon Wiggins Sr. (born November 2, 1966)

== Discography ==
List of albums, with selected chart positions
Title	Album details	Peak chart positions
Title	Album details	US Gos
Allen & Allen	Released: 1994; Label: Light; CD	20
A-Blazing Grace	Released: 1995; Label: CGI; CD	29
Christmas Like Never Before	Released: 1995; Label: CGI; CD	31
Come Sunday	Released: 1996; Label: Platinum; CD	17
A New Beginning	Released: 1998; Label: CGI; CD	–
Love Sweet Love	Released: 2001; Label: Allen & Allen; CD	31
Impressions	Released: 2003; Label: Allen & Allen; CD	–
