= Harry Leahey =

American jazz guitarist and teacher

- Birth name: Harry F. Leahey
- Born: September 1, 1935 Plattsburgh, New York, U.S.
- Died: August 12, 1990 (aged 54) New Brunswick, New Jersey
- Genres: Jazz
- Occupation(s): Musician, teacher
- Instrument: Guitar
- Years active: 1951–1990

Harry F. Leahey (September 1, 1935 — August 12, 1990) was an American jazz guitarist and teacher.

== Biography ==
=== Guitar studies ===
Leahey received his first guitar, a Stella, at the age of thirteen. He went on to study with Lou Melia at Sayer's Studio in Plainfield, who taught him the "consecutive picking" technique. A few years later, he began studying with Harry Volpe, studio guitarist and teacher of such players as Joe Pass and Sal Salvador. His saxophonist neighbour, Bill Pfeiffer, introduced Leahey to the jazz and studio guitarist Johnny Smith, who took him under his wing for six months and showed him how to perform "alternate picking."

Around 1952, he made friends with a record store employee, Edie Linzer, who lent him a 10-inch record of Django Reinhardt. It featured "Manoir des mes rêves" and "Nuages." He quickly added these songs to his repertoire, eventually re-recording them in the 70's with the Phil Woods Quintet.

=== Career ===
As a teenager, Leahey formed a group with his sister Edith, which went by the name of "Sunshine", inspired by the Les Paul and Mary Ford duo. They are joined by his childhood friend, Tom Anthony, playing bass. They toured in Plainfield theatres, and appeared on TV in the Ding Dong Show and the Ed Sullivan Show where they played alongside a yodeler, Sara Conk. During Leahey's high school years, Sunshine began to get tired of singing. Leahey & Anthony met Richie Moore in 1951 and formed "The Richie Moore Four" along with pianist Romolo Ferri. The band plays in clubs, covering the hits of the time. In the summer of 1955, they were booked at the last minute to play on the SS Groote Beer, travelling from Hoboken, New Jersey to Rotterdam, Netherlands. Once in Europe, they decided to head off to Paris where they performed throughout July.

When Leahey left the army in the early 1960s, he met Roy Cumming & Glenn Davis, with whom he later formed the Harry Leahey Trio. Through them, he met pianist Mike Melillo, who had previously played with Sonny Rollins and Phil Woods. In 1970, the four of them formed the band In Free Association.

He was then offered to join the Phil Woods Quartet, which became the Quintet in 1974 or 1975. As part of the band, he contributed on the Grammy Award winning Live from the Showboat (1977) album. His arrangement of Django Reinhardt's "Manoir de mes rêves (Django's Castle)" and his own "Rain Danse" composition were featured on the album. He would later say that he considered this album one of the "high-points" of his career. As part of the Newport Jazz Festival, the Maynard Ferguson Orchestra and the Phil Woods Quintet shared the bill at a midnight concert on June 28, 1977. Leahey left the band in 1978, stating he "preferred staying home and teaching."

From 1978 to 1990 he performed with his own trio, featuring Roy Cumming on bass and Glenn Davis on drums and in duo settings with various bass players. As leader, he recorded one album with his trio, one duo album with bassist Steve Gilmore and one solo album.

Leahey gave guitar lessons at his home in Plainfield, New Jersey and from 1974 to 1988 at William Paterson University. His students include Bob DeVos, Jon Herington, Vic Juris, Chuck Loeb, Jack Six, and Warren Vaché Jr.

== Personal life ==
Harry F. Leahey was born on September 1, 1935, in Plattsburg, New York, to parents Henry Leahey, member of the U.S. Army and Edith Leahey, née Lamonde. He had two brothers, Michael and Patrick Leahey, and a sister, Edith Dillon. In his early years, his father encouraged him to become a professional boxer, and he used to train at the local YMCA. He graduated from the North Plainfield High School in 1953. Between 1960 and 1962, Leahey served in the U.S. Army. During this time, he learned the saxophone on his own in order to join a military music band.

He got married on May 4, 1960, to Karen Anthony, his childhood friend Tom's younger sister, with whom he had 4 children, two daughters, Deborah& Gillian and 2 sons, Dennis & Jimmy. Jimmy Leahey is also a guitarist in his own trio, in Dennis DeYoung's band and in ex-Spin Doctors guitarist Anthony Krizan's band Purple Earth. On November 8, 1987, Karen Leahey died from the complications of a disease.

A longtime resident of North Plainfield, New Jersey, Leahey died of colon cancer on August 12, 1990, after spending 15 days at the Robert Wood Johnson University Hospital in New Brunswick, New Jersey.

== Discography ==
=== As leader ===
- Still Waters (Omni Sound, 1980)
- Silver Threads with Steve Gilmore, (Omni Sound, 1982)

=== As sideman ===
- John Coates Jr., Pocono Friends (Omni Sound, 1980)
- John Coates Jr., Pocono Friends Encore (Omni Sound, 1982)
- John Coates Jr., Our Love Is Here to Stay (Baybridge, 1982)
- Al Cohn, In Concert at East Stroudsburg University, April 17, 1986 (IAJRC, 2001)
- Michel Legrand, Le Jazz Grand (Gryphon, 1979)
- Mark Murphy, Living Room (Muse, 1986)
- Don Sebesky, Giant Box (CTI, 1973)
- Phil Woods, Live from the Showboat (RCA Victor, 1977)
- Phil Woods, Song for Sisyphus (Gryphon, 1978)
