= Young Guns (album) =

Live album by Gene Ludwig and Pat Martino
- Released: 2014
- Recorded: 1968 or 1969
- Venue: Club 118, Louisville, Kentucky
- Genre: Jazz
- Label: HighNote Records; HCD 7258
- Producer: Joe Fields, Jon Rosenberg

Pat Martino chronology
Alone Together (2012)	Young Guns (2014)	Nexus (2015)

Young Guns is a live album by jazz organist Gene Ludwig and guitarist Pat Martino. It was recorded during 1968 or 1969 at Club 118 in Louisville, Kentucky, and was released in 2014 by HighNote Records. On the album, Ludwig and Martino are joined by drummer Randy Gelispie.

== Reception ==
Professional ratings
Review scores
Source	Rating
All About Jazz	4/5 stars

In a review for All About Jazz, Jack Bowers wrote: "Ludwig... sprays bluesy notes and ideas all over the landscape, while Martino, a lyrical machine, has the proper phrase for every occasion, whether rushing quickly forward or simply hanging loose. Gelispie, a splendid soloist when his number is called, serves as the trio's rhythmic anchor, deftly shaping the time as Ludwig and Martino zigzag around and through it. To put it another way, all three are at the top of their respective games... Even though the Young Guns no longer answer to that name, they leave no doubt in this colorful scrapbook why it was once very much their province." In a separate AAJ article, Marc Myers commented: "Placed in a club... Martino caught fire. He used his guitar as a swinging whip, cracking it as he tore into blues and standards. As Young Guns demonstrates, Martino could stir up the scene with long, impeccable runs and give the organ a run for its money in the funky grease department... Each track on this album has an energy level that raises hairs."

Derek Taylor, writing for Dusted Magazine, stated: "Precision octaves and racing single-note runs are regular facets of Martino's arsenal and the guitarist repeatedly ramps the tempo, testing Ludwig and Gelispie, who give it right back in return... If there's a gripe to be made... it's in the bombast of some of his and his partners' passages herein... that's where the collection's title comes in and any excesses in expression by three musicians enamored of their prodigious skills can readily occasion forgiveness."

Jazz Weekly's George W. Harris remarked: "The band stretches out for each song, so there's lots of room for Martino to create sonic landscapes and allow Ludwig to kick out the jams on the smoky B3... Relaxed, casual and inspired these guys sound like they're out to change the world; you can't do wrong with this blast from the past."

In a review for Jazz Times, Mike Shanley stated that the album "reveals a group that was every bit as powerful as the groups that inspired the trio's sound... Martino astounds, alternating between rapid picking... and Montgomery-inspired octaves."

== Track listing ==
1. "Who Can I Turn To?" (Leslie Bricusse/Anthony Newley) – 13:40
2. "Mr. P.C." (John Coltrane) – 8:18
3. "Sam Sack" (Milt Jackson) – 12:58
4. "Watch What Happens" (Michel Legrand) – 9:27
5. "Close Your Eyes" (Bernice Petkere) – 12:26
6. "Road Song" (Wes Montgomery) – 7:59
7. "Colossus" (Pat Martino) – 11:58

== Personnel ==
- Gene Ludwig – organ
- Pat Martino – guitar
- Randy Gelispie – drums
