= Randy Gelispie =

American musician

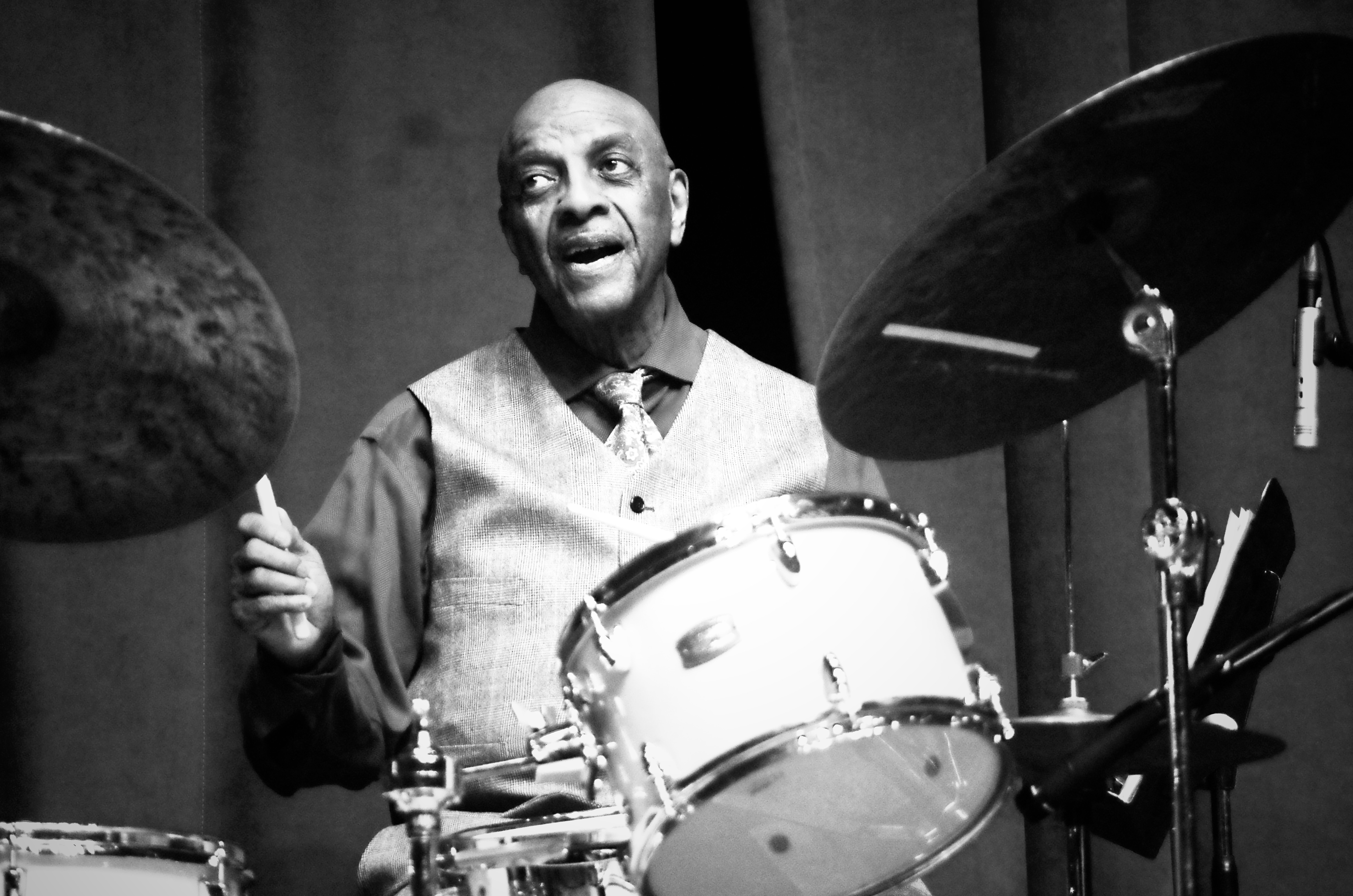
Randy Gelispie, Lansing, Michigan

Randle Gelispie, "Randy" or "Uncle G", is an American jazz percussionist, drummer, and educator.

Born in 1935 in Akron, Ohio, Randy Gelispie began playing drums at a young age. He played clubs while still in his teens, technically illegal for him to even be there inside some of them. Everyone around knew who he was though, and there are stories of police even helping him carry his equipment.

During his career as a professional drummer, Randy was able to meet and/or hear almost every major jazz musician, from the peak years of jazz history in America.

Gelispie is currently teaching at the Jazz Studies drum department at Michigan State University College of Music. He came to MSU before the formation of the Jazz Studies program in 1991, to work with a combined Arts and Music department.

Former Lincoln Center bassist, Rodney Whitaker, upon founding the jazz studies program, brought Gelispie on as one of the first professors in this major jazz education department.

At that time, Gelispie had been a professional jazz drummer since he started playing with a 10-piece band in the ninth grade in Ohio. He traveled for over thirty years, beginning with Wes Montgomery. He later joined Sonny Stitt, who Randy heard as a teenager.

He also played with Dinah Washington, Etta Jones, Lou Donaldson, Pat Martino, and Gene Ammons. In the Detroit area, he has performed with Joe Williams, Nancy Wilson, Dizzy Gillespie, Tommy Flanagan, Barry Harris, Oliver Jones, O. C. Smith, Al Hibbler, and Geri Allen.

In addition, Gelispie played drums with blues musicians, including Jimmy Witherspoon, John Lee Hooker, and Big Maybelle. Locally, where he lives in Lansing, Michigan, he has played with a vast number of jazz musicians, some who come to MSU as visiting instructors in the Jazz Studies Department.

Friends and collaborators include Donald Walden, Marcus Belgrave, Perry Hughes, Rodney Whitaker, Gary Schunk, Rick Roe, Marion Hayden, Bill Heid, and Andrew Speight.

In 2013, Gelispie was named Jazz Alliance of Mid-Michigan "Honoree," at an event in Lansing, Michigan.

== Discography ==
With Sonny Stitt

- Night Letter (Prestige, 1969)

With Gene Ludwig

- Organ Out Loud (Mainstream Records, 1964)
- The Hot Organ (Time Records, 1967)
- Back on the Track (Loose Leaf, 1998)
- Young Guns (HighNote, 2014) with Pat Martino

With Donald Walden

- A Portrait of You (Fanta-Si Music, 1992)

With Bill Heid

- This is My Rifle ((Westside, 1996))
- Bop Rascal (Savant, 1997)
- Wet Streets (Savant, 1999)
- Dark Secrets (Savant, 2000)
- Da Girl (Savant, 2003)
