= Gene Ludwig =

American jazz and R&B organist (1937–2010)

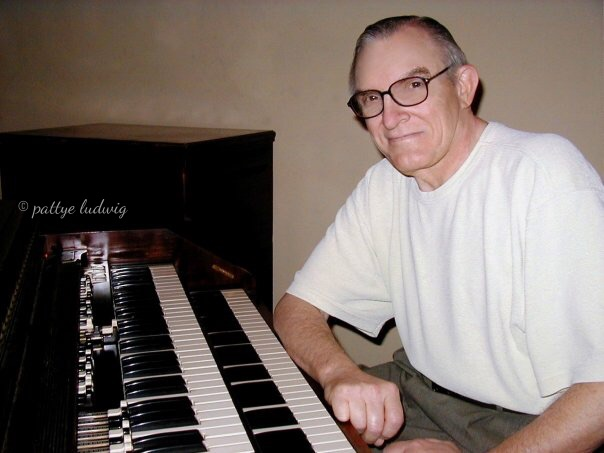

Background information
- Born: September 4, 1937; Twin Rocks, Pennsylvania, U.S.
- Died: July 14, 2010 (aged 72) Monroeville, Pennsylvania, U.S.
- Genres: Jazz
- Occupation: Musician
- Instruments: Hammond organ, piano
- Website: www.geneludwig.com

Gene Ludwig (September 4, 1937 – July 14, 2010) was an American jazz and rhythm and blues organist, who recorded as a leader as well as a sideman for Sonny Stitt, Arthur Prysock, Scott Hamilton, Bob DeVos, and Leslie West, and others. Ludwig received international acclaim as a Hammond organ player and was a prominent figure in the Pittsburgh, Pennsylvania jazz scene.

== Life and career ==
Born in Twin Rocks, Cambria County, Ludwig was raised in the boroughs of Wilkinsburg and Swissvale, near Pittsburgh. He began studying the piano at age 6. Ludwig became interested in rhythm and blues after hearing Ruth Brown, Big Joe Turner and organists Bill Doggett and Wild Bill Davis played by disc jockey Porky Chedwick on WHOD in Homestead.

Ludwig graduated from Swissvale High School in 1955, and studied physics and mathematics at Edinboro State Teachers College. He left due to his father going on strike at Westinghouse Electric, and returned to Pittsburgh to work in construction. Ludwig also began performing in local vocal groups. He heard organist Jimmy Smith perform at the Hurricane nightclub in the Hill District, which inspired him to take up the Hammond organ. Ludwig bought a M-100 organ, then a C-3 model, and finally a B-3 after sharing a bill with Jimmy Smith in 1964 in Atlantic City, New Jersey.

Ludwig travelled along the East Coast and to Ohio, performing jazz and rhythm and blues, and released numerous singles and albums as a leader and a sideman. He released a 45-rpm single of the Ray Charles song "Sticks & Stones" in 1963, then in 1967 he released Mother Blues on Johnny Nash's Jocida record label and replaced Don Patterson in saxophonist Sonny Stitt's band in 1969, appearing on Stitt's album, Night Letter. Ludwig toured with bass-baritone vocalist Arthur Prysock and guitarist Pat Martino. He released the album, Now's the Time, in 1980 on Muse Records, and continued to travel and work through the '80s and '90s, regularly performing at Pittsburgh's Crawford Grill and James Street Tavern. He signed with Loose Leaf/Blues Leaf Records in 1997 and released the albums Back on the Track, Soul Serenade, The Groove ORGANization, Hands On, and Live in Las Vegas, for the label.

Ludwig married Pattye Zamborsky on September 30, 2001, and they resided in Monroeville, Pennsylvania, a suburb of Pittsburgh. Ludwig died in Monroeville on July 14, 2010. The posthumous album, Love Notes of Cole Porter, was released in 2011 by Jim Alfredson's Big O Records, where Ludwig covered standards by Cole Porter, including "What Is This Thing Called Love?", "I Love You", "Begin the Beguine", and "You'd Be So Nice to Come Home To".

== Discography ==
=== As leader ===
- Organ Out Loud (Mainstream, 1964)
- The Educated Sounds of Gene Ludwig (Travis, 1965)
- This Is Gene Ludwig (GeLu, 1965)
- The Hot Organ (Time, 1967)
- Now's the Time (Muse, 1980)
- Blues and More (GeLu, 1982)
- Back on the Track (Loose Leaf, 1998)
- Soul Serenade (Loose Leaf, 2000)
- The Groove ORGANization (Blues Leaf, 2002)
- Hands On (Blues Leaf, 2004)
- Live in Las Vegas (Blues Leaf, 2006)
- Duff's Blues with Bill Warfield Big Band (18th & Vine, 2008)
- Love Notes of Cole Porter (Big O, 2011)
- Young Guns with Pat Martino (HighNote, 2014)

=== As sideman ===
- Cecil Brooks III, Double Exposure (Savant, 2006)
- Bob DeVos, DeVos' Groove Guitar! (Blues Leaf, 2003)
- Scott Hamilton, Across the Tracks (Concord Jazz, 2008)
- Plas Johnson and Red Holloway, Keep That Groove Going! (Milestone, 2001)
- Jimmy Ponder, What's New (HighNote, 2002 [2005])
- Billy Price, Danger Zone (Corona Music, 2000)
- Sonny Stitt, Night Letter (Prestige, 1969)
