= Wynton Kelly discography =

Wynton Kelly was a jazz pianist. His appearances on record date from 1948 to 1970 and include more than a dozen albums under his own name and more than 120 as a sideman.

== Discography ==
=== As leader/co-leader ===
Recording date	Title	Label	Year released	Notes
1951-07, 1951-08	Piano Interpretations	Blue Note	1951	Trio, with Oscar Pettiford and Franklin Skeete (bass; separately), Lee Abrams (drums, congas)
1958-01	Piano	Riverside	1958	Quartet, with Kenny Burrell (guitar), Paul Chambers (bass), Philly Joe Jones (drums)
1959-02, 1959-03	Kelly Blue	Riverside	1959	Trio, with Paul Chambers (bass), Jimmy Cobb (drums); some tracks are sextet, with Nat Adderley (cornet), Bobby Jaspar (flute), Benny Golson (tenor sax) added
1959-08	Kelly Great	Vee Jay	1959	Quintet, with Lee Morgan (trumpet), Wayne Shorter (tenor sax), Paul Chambers (bass), Philly Joe Jones (drums)
1960-04	Kelly at Midnight	Vee-Jay	1960	Trio, with Paul Chambers (bass), Philly Joe Jones (drums)
1961-07	Wynton Kelly!	Vee-Jay	1961	Trio, with Paul Chambers and Sam Jones (bass; separately), Jimmy Cobb (drums)
1959-08, 1960-04, 1961-07	Someday My Prince Will Come	Vee-Jay	1961	Trio, with Paul Chambers and Sam Jones (bass; separately), Jimmy Cobb (drums); one track is quintet, as on Kelly Great - released in 1977
1963-05, 1963-11	Comin' in the Back Door	Verve	1963	With orchestra conducted by Claus Ogerman on most tracks, and Kenny Burrell (guitar), Paul Chambers (bass), Jimmy Cobb (drums)
1964-03	It's All Right!	Verve	1964	Quintet on most tracks, with Kenny Burrell (guitar), Paul Chambers (bass), Jimmy Cobb (drums), Candido Camero (conga); The Tommy Rey Caribe Steel Band added on one track
1965-02	Undiluted	Verve	1965	Trio, with Paul Chambers (bass), Jimmy Cobb (drums); quintet on one track, with Ray Stevenson (flute), unknown (percussion) added
1965-06, 1965-07, 1965-08	Blues on Purpose	Xanadu	1983	Trio, with Paul Chambers (bass), Jimmy Cobb (drums); in concert
1965-06, 1965-09	Smokin' at the Half Note	Verve	1965	Quartet, co-led with Wes Montgomery (guitar), Paul Chambers (bass), Jimmy Cobb (drums); in concert
1965-09, 1965-11	Maximum Swing: The Unissued 1965 Half Note Recordings	Resonance	2023	Quartet, co-led with Wes Montgomery (guitar), Paul Chambers, Ron Carter, Larry Ridley (bass; separately), Jimmy Cobb (drums); in concert
1966-09	Full View	Milestone	1967	Trio, with Ron McClure (bass), Jimmy Cobb (drums)
1967-11	Interpretations	Vee-Jay	1977	Quartet, with Hank Mobley (tenor sax), Cecil McBee (bass), Jimmy Cobb (drums); in concert
1968	In Concert	Vee-Jay	1977	Quartet, with George Coleman (tenor sax), Ron McClure (bass) Jimmy Cobb (drums); in concert
1968-08	Last Trio Session	Delmark	1988	Trio, with Paul Chambers (bass), Jimmy Cobb (drums)

=== As sideman ===
==== Albums ====
Year recorded	Leader	Title	Label
1958	Pepper Adams and Jimmy Knepper	The Pepper-Knepper Quintet	MetroJazz
1958	Julian "Cannonball" Adderley	Things Are Getting Better	Riverside
1959	Julian "Cannonball" Adderley	Cannonball Adderley Quintet in Chicago	Mercury
1959	Julian "Cannonball" Adderley	Cannonball Takes Charge	Riverside
1961	Julian "Cannonball" Adderley	African Waltz	Riverside
1961	Julian "Cannonball" Adderley	Plus	Riverside
1959	Nat Adderley	Much Brass	Riverside
1960	Nat Adderley	That's Right!	Riverside
1961	Nat Adderley	Naturally!	Jazzland
1964	Lorez Alexandria	Alexandria the Great	Impulse!
1964	Lorez Alexandria	More of the Great Lorez Alexandria	Impulse!
1970	Gene Ammons	Night Lights	Prestige
1960	Walter Benton	Out of This World	Jazzland
1957	Art Blakey	Theory of Art	RCA
1960	Bob Brookmeyer	Jazz Is a Kick	Mercury
1961	Joy Bryan	Make the Man Love Me	Contemporary
1957	Donald Byrd and Gigi Gryce	Modern Jazz Perspective	Columbia
1958	Donald Byrd	Off to the Races	Blue Note
1958	Betty Carter	Out There	Peacock
1959	Paul Chambers	Go	Vee-Jay
1960	Paul Chambers	1st Bassman	Vee-Jay
1960	James Clay and David "Fathead" Newman	The Sound of the Wide Open Spaces!!!!	Riverside
1957	Jimmy Cleveland	Cleveland Style	EmArcy
1959	John Coltrane	Giant Steps	Atlantic
1959	John Coltrane	Coltrane Jazz	Atlantic
1959	Sonny Criss	At the Crossroads	Peacock
1959	Miles Davis	Kind of Blue	Columbia
1960	Miles Davis and John Coltrane	Copenhagen 1960	Royal Jazz
1960	Miles Davis and Sonny Stitt	Live in Stockholm 1960	Dragon
1961	Miles Davis	Someday My Prince Will Come	Columbia
1961	Miles Davis	In Person, Vol. 1 – Friday Night at the Blackhawk	Columbia
1961	Miles Davis	In Person, Vol. 2 – Saturday Night at the Blackhawk	Columbia
1961	Miles Davis	Miles Davis at Carnegie Hall	Columbia
1961	Miles Davis	Live Miles: More Music from the Legendary Carnegie Hall Concert	Columbia
1968	Donna Drake	Donna Sings Dinah	Luxor
1954	Art Farmer	Early Art	New Jazz
1959	Curtis Fuller	The Curtis Fuller Jazztet	Savoy
1952	Dizzy Gillespie	Dee Gee Days: The Savoy Sessions	Savoy
1954	Dizzy Gillespie	Dizzy and Strings	Norgran
1957	Dizzy Gillespie	Birks' Works	Verve
1957	Dizzy Gillespie	Dizzy in Greece	Verve
1957	Dizzy Gillespie and Stuff Smith	Dizzy Gillespie and Stuff Smith	Verve
1957	Dizzy Gillespie	Dizzy Gillespie at Newport	Verve
1957	Benny Golson	Benny Golson's New York Scene	Contemporary
1957	Benny Golson	The Modern Touch	Riverside
1962	Benny Golson	Turning Point	Mercury
1960	Paul Gonsalves	Gettin' Together	Jazzland
1970	Dexter Gordon	The Jumpin' Blues	Prestige
1960	Bunky Green	My Babe	Exodus
1960	Grant Green	First Session	Blue Note
1956	Johnny Griffin	Introducing Johnny Griffin	Blue Note
1957	Johnny Griffin	A Blowin' Session	Blue Note
1959	Johnny Griffin	The Little Giant	Riverside
1957	Shafi Hadi	The Complete Debut Recordings [Charles Mingus]	Debut
1964	Eddie Harris	Cool Sax, Warm Heart	Columbia
1959	Jimmy Heath	The Thumper	Riverside
1964	Jimmy Heath	On the Trail	Riverside
1959	Bill Henderson	Bill Henderson Sings	Vee-Jay
1968	Joe Henderson	Four	Verve
1968	Joe Henderson	Straight, No Chaser	Verve
1957	Ernie Henry	Seven Standards and a Blues	Riverside
1957	Ernie Henry	Last Chorus	Riverside
1956	Billie Holiday	Lady Sings the Blues	Verve
1961	Helen Humes	Swingin' with Humes	Contemporary
1961	Milt Jackson and Wes Montgomery	Bags Meets Wes!	Riverside
1969	Illinois Jacquet	The Blues; That's Me!	Prestige
1962	Eddie Jefferson	Letter from Home	Riverside
1954	J. J. Johnson	The Eminent Jay Jay Johnson Volume 2	Blue Note
1959	Philly Joe Jones	Drums Around the World	Riverside
1961	Philly Joe Jones and Elvin Jones	Together!	Atlantic
1961	Sam Jones	The Chant	Riverside
1962	Sam Jones	Down Home	Riverside
1969	Clifford Jordan	In the World	Strata-East
1960	King Curtis	The New Scene of King Curtis	New Jazz
1960	King Curtis	Soul Meeting	Prestige
1962	Roland Kirk	Domino	Mercury
1957	Steve Lacy	Soprano Sax	Prestige
1957	Abbey Lincoln	That's Him!	Riverside
1958	Abbey Lincoln	It's Magic	Riverside
1959	Abbey Lincoln	Abbey Is Blue	Riverside
1960	Booker Little	Booker Little	Time
1965	Johnny Lytle	The Loop	Tuba
1966	Johnny Lytle	New and Groovy	Tuba
1962	Chuck Mangione	Recuerdo	Jazzland
1957	Charles Mingus	The Complete Debut Recordings	Debut
1958	Blue Mitchell	Big 6	Riverside
1959	Blue Mitchell	Out of the Blue	Riverside
1959	Blue Mitchell	Blue Soul	Riverside
1960	Blue Mitchell	Blue's Moods	Riverside
1962	Blue Mitchell	A Sure Thing	Riverside
1958	Hank Mobley	Peckin' Time	Blue Note
1960	Hank Mobley	Soul Station	Blue Note
1960	Hank Mobley	Roll Call	Blue Note
1961	Hank Mobley	Workout	Blue Note
1961	Hank Mobley	Another Workout	Blue Note
1962	Wes Montgomery	Full House	Riverside
1965	Wes Montgomery	Other Sessions at the Half Note 1965	All Blues
1965	Wes Montgomery	Willow Weep for Me	Verve
1957	Lee Morgan	Lee Morgan Vol.3	Blue Note
1957	Lee Morgan, Al Grey, Billy Mitchell	Dizzy Atmosphere	Specialty
1960	Lee Morgan	Here's Lee Morgan	Vee-Jay
1961	Mark Murphy	Rah	Riverside
1960	David Newman	Straight Ahead	Atlantic
1968	Cecil Payne	Zodiac	Strata-East
1960	Art Pepper	Gettin' Together	Contemporary
1957	Paul Quinichette and Charlie Rouse	The Chase Is On	Bethlehem
1957	Sonny Red	Two Altos	Savoy
1959	Sonny Red	Out of the Blue	Blue Note
1959	Dizzy Reece	Star Bright	Blue Note
1956	Sonny Rollins	Sonny Rollins, Volume 1	Blue Note
1957	Sonny Rollins	Newk's Time	Blue Note
1957	A. K. Salim	Pretty for the People	Savoy
1959	Wayne Shorter	Introducing Wayne Shorter	Vee-Jay
1961	Don Sleet	All Members	Jazzland
1959–1960	Frank Strozier	Fantastic Frank Strozier	Vee-Jay
1960	Art Taylor	A.T.'s Delight	Blue Note
1957	Clark Terry	Serenade to a Bus Seat	Riverside
1960–1961	Teri Thornton	Devil May Care	Riverside
1967	Phil Upchurch	Feeling Blue	Milestone
1957	Various	Jazz Is Busting out all Over!	Savoy
1957	Various	Sittin' In	Verve
1970	Various	Super Black Blues, Vol. 2	Flying Dutchman
1955	Dinah Washington	For Those in Love	EmArcy
1955	Dinah Washington	Dinah!	EmArcy
1958	Dinah Washington	Newport '58	EmArcy
1962	Dinah Washington	Back to the Blues	Roulette
1960	Nat Wright	The Biggest Voice in Jazz	Warwick
1952	Lester Young	The President Lester Young, Vol. 3	Ambrosia
1952	Lester Young	The President Lester Young, Vol. 4	Ambrosia

==== Singles ====
Year recorded	Leader	Title	Label
1948	Hal Singer	"A Plug for Cliff" / "Cornbread"	Savoy
1948	Hal Singer	"Swanee River"	Savoy
1949	Billy Stewart	"Porgy" / "Day In, Day Out"	Savoy
1949	Babs Gonzales	"Prelude to a Nightmare"	Capitol
1949	Eddie Vinson	"Person to Person"	King
1949	Eddie Vinson	"Wineola" / "Somebody Done Stole My Cherry Red"	King
1949	Eddie Vinson	"Featherbed Mama"	King
1949	Eddie Vinson	"Ashes on My Pillow" / "No Good Woman Blues"	King
1949	Eddie Vinson	"I'm Gonna Wind Your Clock" / "I'm Weak but Willing"	King
1950	Eddie "Lockjaw" Davis	"I'm Gonna Eat You with a Spoon" / "If the Motif Is Right"	Birdland
1950	Eddie "Lockjaw" Davis	"Little Rock" / "The Lock"	Birdland
1951	Dinah Washington	"Just One More Chance" / "Baby Did You Hear"	Mercury
1951	Dinah Washington	"Be Fair to Me" / "Saturday Night"	Mercury
1951	Dinah Washington	"If You Don't Believe I'm Leaving" / "I'm a Fool to Want You"	Mercury
1951	Dinah Washington	"Just One More Chance" / "Baby Did You Hear"	Mercury
1952	Dinah Washington	"Wheel of Fortune" / "Tell Me Why"	Mercury
1952	Dinah Washington	"New Blow-Top Blues" / "Trouble in Mind"	Mercury
1952	Dinah Washington	"Mad About the Boy" / "I Can't Face the Music"	Mercury
1952	Dinah Washington	"Stormy Weather"	Mercury
1952	Dinah Washington	"Pillow Blues" / "Double Dealing Daddy"	Mercury
1954	Dinah Washington	"No, No, No, You Can't Love Two" / "Big Long Slidin' Thing"	Mercury
1955	Dinah Washington	"That's All I Want from You" / "You Stay on My Mind"	Mercury
