= Paul Chambers discography =

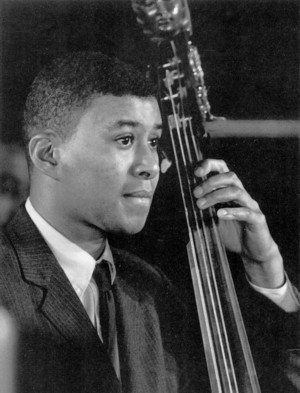

The Paul Chambers discography describes the works of American jazz bassist Paul Chambers, which he recorded from 1955–1969.

== As leader/co-leader ==
- 1956: Chambers' Music (Aladdin/Jazz West, 1956)
- 1956: Whims of Chambers (Blue Note, 1957)
- 1956: High Step with John Coltrane (Blue Note, 1975)
- 1951-57: The East/West Controversy with Hampton Hawes (Xanadu, 1975)
- 1957: Westlake Bounce The Music of John Graas with Philly Joe Jones (Fresh Sound, 1957)
- 1957: Bass on Top (Blue Note, 1957)
- 1957: Paul Chambers Quintet (Blue Note, 1958)
- 1959: Go (Vee-Jay, 1959)
- 1959: Just Friends with Julian "Cannonball" Adderley (Charly/Le Jazz, 1959)
- 1960: 1st Bassman (Vee-Jay, 1961)

== As sideman ==
With Cannonball Adderley

- Presenting Cannonball Adderley (Savoy, 1955)
- Julian "Cannonball" Adderley (EmArcy, 1955)
- Cannonball Adderley Quintet in Chicago (Mercury, 1959) – reissued as Cannonball and Coltrane (Philips, 1965)
- Cannonball Takes Charge (Riverside, 1959)

With Nat Adderley

- Introducing Nat Adderley (Mercury/Wing, 1955) – reissued as Them Adderleys (Limelight, 1966)
- Naturally! (Jazzland, 1961)

With Toshiko Akiyoshi

- The Toshiko Trio (Storyville, 1956)
- Toshiko Mariano and her Big Band (Vee-Jay, 1964)

With Chet Baker

- Chet Baker in New York (Riverside, 1959) – rec. 1958
- Chet (Riverside, 1959) – rec. 1958-59

With Kenny Burrell

- Jazzmen of Detroit with Tommy Flanagan, Pepper Adams, Kenny Clarke (Savoy, 1956)
- Introducing Kenny Burrell (Blue Note, 1956)
- John Jenkins with Kenny Burrell (Blue Note, 1957)
- Kenny Burrell & John Coltrane (Prestige 1958)

With Donald Byrd

- Byrd's Word (Savoy, 1955)
- New Formulas from the Jazz Lab (RCA Victor, 1957)
- Motor City Scene (Bethlehem, 1960)

With Sonny Clark

- Sonny's Crib (Blue Note, 1957)
- Sonny Clark Trio (Blue Note, 1957)
- Cool Struttin' (Blue Note, 1958)
- Blues in the Night (Blue Note, 1958)
- My Conception (Blue Note, 1959)

With John Coltrane

- Coltrane (Prestige 1957)
- Blue Train (Blue Note, 1958)
- Bahia (Prestige 1958)
- Black Pearls (Prestige 1958)
- Settin' the Pace (Prestige 1958)
- John Coltrane with the Red Garland Trio (Prestige 1958)
- Soultrane (Prestige 1958)
- Stardust (Prestige 1958)
- The Believer (Prestige 1958)
- The Last Trane (Prestige 1958)
- Bags & Trane (with Milt Jackson, Atlantic, 1960)
- Giant Steps (Atlantic, 1960)
- Lush Life (Prestige 1961)

With Sonny Criss

- This Is Criss! (Prestige, 1966)
- Portrait of Sonny Criss (Prestige, 1967)

With Miles Davis

- Miles (Prestige 1956)
- Collectors' Items (Prestige 1956)
- 'Round About Midnight (Columbia, 1957)
- Cookin (Prestige 1957)
- Miles Ahead (Columbia, 1957)
- Relaxin (Prestige 1958)
- Milestones (Columbia, 1958)
- Porgy and Bess (Columbia, 1959)
- Kind of Blue (Columbia, 1959)
- Steamin (Prestige 1960)
- Sketches of Spain (Columbia, 1960)
- Workin (Prestige 1961)
- Jazz at the Plaza Vol. I (Columbia, 1973) – rec. 1958
- 1958 Miles (Columbia, 1974) – rec. 1958
- Someday My Prince Will Come (Columbia, 1961)
- In Person Friday and Saturday Nights at the Blackhawk, Complete (1961)
- Quiet Nights (Columbia, 1962)
- Miles Davis at Newport 1955–1975: The Bootleg Series Vol. 4 (Columbia Legacy, 2015)

With Kenny Dorham

- Blue Spring (Riverside, 1959)
- Quiet Kenny (Prestige 1959)
- Whistle Stop (Blue Note, 1961)

With Gil Evans

- Gil Evans & Ten (Prestige 1957)
- New Bottle Old Wine (Pacific Jazz, 1958)
- The Individualism of Gil Evans (Verve, 1964)

With Curtis Fuller

- Curtis Fuller with Red Garland (Prestige 1957)
- The Opener (Blue Note, 1957)
- Bone & Bari (Blue Note, 1957)
- Sliding Easy (United Artists, 1959)
- The Curtis Fuller Jazztet (Savoy, 1959)

With Red Garland

- A Garland of Red (Prestige 1956)
- Red Garland's Piano (Prestige, 1957)
- Groovy (Prestige, 1957)
- Red Garland Revisited! (Prestige, 1969)– rec. 1957
- The P.C. Blues (Prestige, 1957)
- Dig It! (Prestige, 1958)
- Can't See for Lookin' (Prestige, 1958)
- It's a Blue World (Prestige, 1958)
- Manteca (Prestige, 1958)
- All Kinds of Weather (Prestige 1959)
- Red in Blues-ville (Prestige 1959)
- The Red Garland Trio (Moodsville, 1960) – rec. 1958

With Benny Golson

- Benny Golson's New York Scene (Contemporary, 1957)
- The Modern Touch (Riverside, 1958)
- Groovin' with Golson (New Jazz, 1959)
- Pop + Jazz = Swing (Audio Fidelity, 1961)
- Turning Point (Mercury, 1962)

With Dexter Gordon

- Dexter Calling... (Blue Note, 1961)
- Landslide (Blue Note, 1980) – rec. 1961-62

With Bennie Green

- Bennie Green Blows His Horn (Prestige, 1955)
- The 45 Session (Blue Note, 1958)
- Glidin' Along (Jazzland, 1961)

With Johnny Griffin

- A Blowin' Session (Blue Note, 1957)
- The Congregation (Blue Note, 1957)

With Jimmy Heath

- The Thumper (Riverside, 1959)
- On the Trail (Riverside, 1964)

With Joe Henderson

- Four (Verve, 1968)
- Straight, No Chaser (Verve, 1968)

With Elmo Hope

- Informal Jazz (Prestige 1956)
- Here's Hope! (Celebrity, 1961)
- High Hope! (Beacon, 1961)

With Milt Jackson

- Bags' Opus (United Artists, 1959) – recorded in 1958
- Bags & Trane (Atlantic, (w/John Coltrane) 1960)
- Statements (Impulse!, 1961)

With J. J. Johnson

- The Eminent Jay Jay Johnson Volume 2 (Blue Note, 1955)
- Trombone for Two with Kai Winding (Columbia, 1955)
- First Place (Columbia, 1957)
- The Great Kai & J. J. with Kai Winding (Impulse!, 1960)

With Philly Joe Jones

- Philly Joe's Beat ([Atlantic, 1960)
- Together! (Atlantic, 1961)

With Wynton Kelly

- Piano (Riverside, 1958)
- Kelly Blue (Riverside, 1959)
- Kelly at Midnight (Vee-Jay, 1960)
- Kelly Great (Vee-Jay, 1960)
- Wynton Kelly! (Vee-Jay, 1961)
- Comin' in the Back Door (Verve, 1963)
- It's All Right! (Verve, 1964)
- Undiluted (Verve, 1965)
- Blues on Purpose (Xanadu, 1965)
- Last Trio Session (Delmark, 1968)

With King Curtis

- The New Scene of King Curtis (New Jazz, 1960)
- Soul Meeting (Prestige, 1960)

With Abbey Lincoln

- That's Him! (Riverside, 1957)
- It's Magic (Riverside, 1958)

With Les McCann

- Soul Hits (Pacific Jazz, 1963)
- A Bag of Gold (Pacific Jazz, 1966) – rec. 1963

With Hal McKusick

- Triple Exposure (Prestige, 1957)
- Cross Section-Saxes (Decca, 1958)

With Jackie McLean

- Jackie's Pal (Prestige, 1956)
- McLean's Scene (Prestige/New Jazz, 1957)
- Strange Blues (Prestige, 1957)
- Jackie's Bag (Blue Note, 1959)
- New Soil (Blue Note, 1959)
- Capuchin Swing (Blue Note, 1960)

With Hank Mobley

- Tenor Conclave (Prestige 1957) – rec. 1956
- Hank Mobley Sextet (Blue Note, 1957) – rec. 1956
- Peckin' Time (Blue Note, 1959) – rec. 1958
- Soul Station (Blue Note, 1960)
- Roll Call (Blue Note, 1961) – rec. 1960
- Workout (Blue Note, 1962) – rec. 1961
- The Turnaround! (Blue Note, 1965) – rec. 1963-65
- Another Workout (Blue Note, 1985) – rec. 1961

With Lee Morgan

- Lee Morgan Sextet (Blue Note, 1956)
- Lee Morgan Vol. 3 (Blue Note, 1957)
- City Lights (Blue Note, 1957)
- The Cooker (Blue Note, 1957)
- Lee-Way (Blue Note, 1960)
- Here's Lee Morgan (Vee-Jay, 1960)
- Charisma (Blue Note, 1966)
- The Rajah (Blue Note, 1966)

With Wes Montgomery

- Full House (Riverside, 1962)
- Smokin' at the Half Note (Verve, 1965)
- Maximum Swing: The Unissued 1965 Half Note Recordings (Resonance, 1965)
- Willow Weep for Me (Verve, 1969)

With Art Pepper

- Art Pepper Meets the Rhythm Section (Contemporary, 1957)
- Gettin' Together (Contemporary, 1960)

With Bud Powell

- Bud! The Amazing Bud Powell (Vol. 3) (Blue Note, 1957)
- The Scene Changes: The Amazing Bud Powell (Vol. 5) (Blue Note, 1958)

With Freddie Redd

- Shades of Redd (Blue Note, 1960)
- Redd's Blues (Blue Note, 1961)

With Sonny Rollins

- Tenor Madness (Prestige 1956)
- Sonny Rollins, Vol. 2 (Blue Note, 1957)
- The Sound of Sonny (Riverside, 1957)

With others

- Pepper Adams,Pepper Adams Plays the Compositions of Charlie Mingus (Workshop Jazz, 1964) – rec. 1963
- Lorez Alexandria, Alexandria the Great (Impulse!, 1964)
- Gene Ammons, Jammin' in Hi Fi with Gene Ammons (Prestige, 1957)
- Walter Benton, Out of This World (Jazzland, 1960)
- Bob Brookmeyer, Jazz Is a Kick (Mercury, 1960)
- Tina Brooks, Back to the Tracks (Blue Note, 1960)
- Jaki Byard, On the Spot! (Prestige, 1967)
- Kenny Clarke,Bohemia After Dark (Savoy, 1955)
- Jimmy Cleveland, Introducing Jimmy Cleveland and His All Stars (EmArcy, 1955)
- John Graas, Jazz Lab 2 (Decca, 1957)
- Kenny Drew, Kenny Drew Trio (Riverside, 1956)
- Teddy Edwards, Nothin' But the Truth! (Prestige, 1966)
- Bill Evans, On Green Dolphin Street (Riverside, 1959)
- Jane Fielding and the Kenny Drew Quintet, Embers Glow (Jazz:West, 1956)
- Grant Green, First Session (Blue Note, 1960)
- Gigi Gryce,Jazz Lab (Jubilee, 1958) with Donald Byrd
- Herbie Hancock, Inventions and Dimensions (Blue Note, 1963)
- Barry Harris, Bull's Eye! (Prestige, 1968)
- Hampton Hawes, Bird Song (Contemporary, 1999) – rec. 1956
- Roy Haynes, We Three (New Jazz, 1959)
- Ernie Henry, Last Chorus (Riverside, 1956–57)
- Richard "Groove" Holmes, Get Up & Get It! (Prestige, 1967)
- Freddie Hubbard, Goin' Up (Blue Note, 1960)
- John Jenkins, John Jenkins with Kenny Burrell (Blue Note, 1957)
- Elvin Jones, And Then Again (Atlantic, 1965)
- Hank Jones, Hank Jones' Quartet (Savoy, 1956)
- Thad Jones, After Hours (Prestige, 1957)
- Quincy Jones, This Is How I Feel About Jazz (ABC-Paramount, 1957)
- Clifford Jordan, Cliff Jordan (Blue Note, 1957)
- Warne Marsh, Warne Marsh (Atlantic, 1958)
- Blue Mitchell, Out of the Blue (Riverside, 1958)
- Thelonious Monk, Brilliant Corners (Riverside, 1956)
- Oliver Nelson, The Blues and the Abstract Truth (Impulse!, 1961)
- Phineas Newborn Jr., A World of Piano! (Contemporary, 1961)
- David "Fathead" Newman, Straight Ahead (Atlantic, 1961)
- Houston Person, Trust in Me (Prestige, 1967)
- The Prestige All Stars, Interplay for 2 Trumpets and 2 Tenors (Prestige, 1957)
- Ike Quebec, Blue and Sentimental (Blue Note, 1961)
- Paul Quinichette, Moods (EmArcy, 1954)
- Sonny Red, Out of the Blue (Blue Note, 1960)
- Dizzy Reece, Star Bright (Blue Note, 1959)
- A. K. Salim, Pretty for the People (Savoy, 1957)
- Sahib Shihab, Jazz Sahib (Savoy, 1957)
- Woody Shaw, In the Beginning (Muse, 1983) – rec. 1965
- Wayne Shorter, Introducing Wayne Shorter (Vee-Jay, 1959)
- Louis Smith, Smithville (Blue Note, 1958)
- Sonny Stitt, Sonny Stitt - Previously Unreleased Recordings (Verve, 1973) – rec. 1960
- Frank Strozier, Fantastic Frank Strozier (Vee-Jay, 1960)
- Art Taylor, A.T.'s Delight (Blue Note, 1960)
- Clark Terry, Serenade to a Bus Seat (Riverside, 1957)
- Stanley Turrentine, ZT's Blues (Blue Note, 1961)
- George Wallington, Live at the Café Bohemia (Progressive, 1955)
- Julius Watkins and Charlie Rouse, Les Jazz Modes (Dawn, 1957)
