= In Style =

In Style may refer to:

- InStyle, a women's fashion magazine founded in 1994
- In Style (David Johansen album)
- In Style (Sonny Stitt album)
- In Style (horse), a show jumping horse
