= Unit 7 (jazz composition) =

American jazz composition

Unit 7 is a jazz composition by bassist Sam Jones originally composed for the 1962 album Nancy Wilson/Cannonball Adderley. It's also known as "Cannon's Theme."

== Notable recordings ==
- Cannonball Adderley – The Cannonball Adderley Sextet In New York (1962)
- Sam Jones – Sam Jones & Co. – Down Home (1962)
- Wes Montgomery and Wynton Kelly – Smokin' at the Half Note (1965)
- The New York Jazz Guitar Ensemble – Four On Six: A Tribute To Wes Montgomery (1985)
