= Someday My Prince Will Come (disambiguation) =

"Someday My Prince Will Come" is a song from Walt Disney's 1937 animated movie Snow White and the Seven Dwarfs.

Someday My Prince Will Come may also refer to:

== Music ==
- Someday My Prince Will Come (Wynton Kelly album), 1961
- Someday My Prince Will Come (Miles Davis album), 1961
- Someday My Prince Will Come (Chet Baker album), 1979
- "Someday My Prince Will Come", a song by '68 Comeback, 1996
- Someday My Prince Will Come, an album by Alexis Cole, 2009

== Television ==
- "Someday My Prince Will Come" (Roseanne), a 1996 episode
- Someday My Prince Will Come, a 2005 documentary by Marc Isaacs
