= Blues on Purpose =

Live album by Wynton Kelly
- Released: 1965
- Recorded: June 2, July 25 & August 17, 1965
- Venue: Half Note Club, New York City
- Genre: Jazz
- Length: 43:25
- Label: Xanadu

Wynton Kelly chronology
Smokin' at the Half Note (1965)	Blues on Purpose (1965)	Full View (1966)

Blues on Purpose is a live album by jazz pianist Wynton Kelly recorded in 1965 and released on the Xanadu label featuring performances by Kelly with Paul Chambers and Jimmy Cobb recorded at the Half Note Club in New York City.

== Reception ==
The Allmusic review by Scott Yanow states that "the recording quality is only so-so, but Kelly's consistently creative ideas... are enjoyable and swinging.

Professional ratings
Review scores
Source	Rating
Allmusic	4/5 stars
The Rolling Stone Jazz Record Guide	4/5 stars

== Track listing ==
All compositions by Wynton Kelly except as indicated

1. "Blues on Purpose" (Rudy Stevenson) - 7:34
2. "If You Could See Me Now" (Tadd Dameron, Carl Sigman) - 6:19
3. "Somebody's Blues" - 9:52
4. "Another Blues" - 8:16
5. "Old Folks" (Dedette Lee Hill, Willard Robison) - 5:54
6. "Milestones" (Miles Davis) - 5:27
  - Recorded at the Half Note, NYC on June 2 (tracks 2 & 4), July 25 (tracks 1 & 3) & August 17 (tracks 5 & 6), 1965

== Personnel ==
- Wynton Kelly - piano
- Paul Chambers - bass
- Jimmy Cobb - drums
