= Eliane Elias Plays Live =

Studio album by Eliane Elias
- Released: November 9, 2010
- Recorded: Amsterdam on 31 May 2002
- Studio: The Bimhuis
- Genre: Jazz
- Length: 1:10:31
- Label: Somethin' Else/EMI
- Producer: Eliane Elias

Eliane Elias chronology
Bossa Nova Stories (2008)	Eliane Elias Plays Live (2010)	Light My Fire (2011)

Professional ratings
Review scores
Source	Rating
All About Jazz	3/5 stars

Eliane Elias Plays Live is the twentieth studio album by Brazilian jazz pianist Eliane Elias. It was recorded live in Amsterdam on May 31, 2002, and released only on November 9, 2010, by Somethin' Else Records / EMI labels under exclusive licence to Blue Note.

== Track listing ==
No.	Title	Writer(s)	Length
1.	"Just Friends"	John Klenner, Sam M. Lewis	10:30
2.	"Bowing to Bud"	Eliane Elias	10:49
3.	"If You Could See Me Now"	Tadd Dameron, Carl Sigman	5:36
4.	"Have You Met Miss Jones"	Richard Rodgers, Lorenz Hart	10:47
5.	"Embraceable You / But Not For Me / Lazz Influence / Who Knows"	George Gershwin, Ira Gershwin	6:37
6.	"Peggy's Blue Skylight"	Charles Mingus	8:01
7.	"Desafinado"	Antonio Carlos Jobim	18:11
Total length:			1:10:31

== Credits ==
- Marc Johnson – bass
- Eliane Elias – concert grand piano
- Joey Baron – drums
