= The Jumpin' Blues =

Studio album by Dexter Gordon
- Released: 1970
- Recorded: August 27, 1970; New York City
- Genre: Jazz
- Length: 37:23
- Label: Prestige; PR 10020
- Producer: Don Schlitten

Dexter Gordon chronology
The Chase! (1970)	The Jumpin' Blues (1970)	The Shadow of Your Smile (1971)

The Jumpin' Blues is an album by saxophonist Dexter Gordon which was recorded in 1970 and released on the Prestige label.

== Reception ==
Professional ratings
Review scores
Source	Rating
Allmusic	4/5 stars
The Rolling Stone Jazz Record Guide	4/5 stars
The Penguin Guide to Jazz Recordings	3/4 stars

Scott Yanow of Allmusic states, "Although tenor saxophonist Dexter Gordon seemed to have been largely forgotten in the U.S. during his long residence in Europe, he was playing in prime form during the period and made occasional trips back to America".

== Track listing ==
All compositions by Dexter Gordon except as indicated

1. "Evergreenish" - 6:02
2. "For Sentimental Reasons" (William Best, Deek Watson) - 6:49
3. "Star Eyes" (Gene de Paul, Don Raye) - 5:21
4. "Rhythm-a-Ning" (Thelonious Monk) - 6:51
5. "If You Could See Me Now" (Tadd Dameron, Carl Sigman) - 6:34
6. "The Jumpin' Blues" (Jay McShann, Charlie Parker) - 5:46

== Personnel ==
- Dexter Gordon - tenor saxophone
- Wynton Kelly - piano
- Sam Jones - bass
- Roy Brooks - drums
