= Peter and Will Anderson =

Identical twin musicians

Peter and Will Anderson (born 27 March 1987) are identical twin American jazz saxophonists and clarinetists, composers and arrangers, and leaders of their own trio and quintet.

== Early life ==
Peter and Will Anderson were born in Washington, DC and raised in Bethesda, MD. They attended Walt Whitman High School and were mentored by many musicians including saxophonist Paul Carr and drummer and vibraphonist Chuck Redd. At age 18, they moved to New York City to attend The Juilliard School from 2005 to 2009 (Bachelor of Music) and 2009-11 (Master of Music).

There they studied under many notable artists including Joe Temperley, Victor Goines, Frank Wess, Benny Golson, Kenny Washington, and Joe Wilder. From 2007 to 2009, Peter and Will were both recipients of the Illinois Jacquet Scholarship in Jazz Studies from Juilliard.

During their undergraduate studies, they were both selected from an international pool of applicants for the Betty Carter's Jazz Ahead program, which included a residency of performances at the Kennedy Center in Washington, DC.

== Career ==
Peter and Will have led performances at the Blue Note Jazz Club, The Kennedy Center, the New Orleans Jazz Festival, Seattle's Triple Door, and DC's Blues Alley.

Their ensembles have performed in over 35 U.S. States, toured Japan, and been featured four times in New York City's famed “Highlights in Jazz" series, alongside Lou Donaldson, Ken Peplowski, and Warren Vache. As guest clinicians, Peter and Will have visited Temple University, Xavier University, University of South Florida, University of Central Oklahoma, Florida State University, Ohio State University, Michigan State University, University of Scranton and others.

The brothers worked together to create, produce and star in five off-Broadway show runs at 59E59 Theaters in Manhattan (Le Jazz Hot, The Count Meets the Duke, The Fabulous Dorseys, and the Joy of Sax).

Peter and Will have released eight albums as leaders on Steeplechase, Smalls, and Gut String Records. The Andersons have also appeared as members of ensembles led by Bob Wilber, Vince Giordano, Wycliffe Gordon, Jimmy Heath, as well as the Village Vanguard Jazz Orchestra.

They have been featured several times on Garrison Keillor's A Prairie Home Companion. For their final appearance in 2016, the Andersons performed a duo version of “Lotus Blossom” commemorating Billy Strayhorn's centennial.

Peter and Will can be heard on the soundtrack of HBO's Boardwalk Empire with Vince Giordano's Nighthawks.

In 2016, Peter and Will were selected by Jazz at Lincoln Center to be featured performers in a concert honoring the music and life of clarinetist Benny Goodman

They have appeared on screen as a part of HBO's Boardwalk Empire and Mildred Pierce, the film Revolutionary Road, and featured in the documentary Vince Giordano: There's a Future in the Past.

== Reception ==
Peter and Will's music has been reviewed and featured in The New York Times, Seattle Times, Washington Post and Jazz Times. In addition, their music was used in HBO's Boardwalk Empire.

New York Times: "Pete and Will Anderson are virtuosos on both clarinet and saxophone."

In 2012, The New York Post described their music as “toe-tapping, heart-lifting jazz.”

In 2014, the Seattle Times wrote “Everything they play sounds fresh, creative and in the moment… [they make] everything they do sound easy –which of course it isn’t… These guys flood the room with joy.”

In 2014, Mike Joyce from the Washington Post reviewed the Anderson Trio album, Reed Reflections and said, “their saxophones and clarinets elegantly converge, converse and engage in delightful counterpoint… the arrangements imaginatively unfolding in ways that consistently bring a fresh perspective to classic jazz tunes.”

In 2015, Jazz Times wrote “Their newest album, Deja Vu, features Albert “Tootie” Heath and was called “a burner that reveals the band’s cohesiveness and spirit… the Andersons excel.”

Peter and Will are featured in a Vanity Fair article by Will Friedwald entitled, “There Millennials Are Shaking up the Jazz World." The Andersons’ 2013 release, Correspondence was included in Vanity Fair magazine's “Four New Releases to Make you Love Jazz” among Miles Davis and Wayne Shorter.

The Anderson's month long show, Le Jazz Hot: How the French Saved Jazz was nominated for 2014 Drama Desk Award in the “Outstanding Review” category.

== Discography ==
As leaders:

- Correspondence - Smalls 2013
- The Music of the Soprano Masters - Gut String 2013
- Reed Reflections - Gut String 2014
- Deja Vu - Gut String 2015
- A Sax Supreme - Steeplechase 2016
- Two Against One - Gut String 2016
- Clarinet Summit - Steeplechase 2017
- Blues for Joe - Gut String 2017
- Wind Power featuring Félix Lemerle - Gut String 2018
- Featuring Jimmy Cobb - Outside In 2020

As Sidemen

- Wycliffe Gordon “Within These Gates of Mine”
- Vince Giordano's Nighthawks "Boardwalk Empire: Music From the HBO Series" (Elektra / Asylum 2011)
- Alex Hoffman "Dark Lights" (Smalls 2011)
- Emily Asher "Dreams May Take You" (2011)
- Juilliard Jazz Orchestra "Waltz Masquerade" (M&I 2009)
- Jason Hainsworth "Kaleidoscope" (2009)
- Juilliard Jazz Ensemble "Blues in the Church" (2009)
- Juilliard Jazz Orchestra "Above and Beyond" feat. Benny Golson (Juilliard Jazz 2007)
- "The Benny Carter Centennial Project" (Evening Star 2007)
- Alex Brown "Montrose Towing" (Foxhaven 2006)
- Capitol Focus Jazz Band "Renewing the Tradition" (Vol. 5: 2003, Vol. 6: 2005)
