= Half Note Club =

Former jazz club in New York City

Coordinates: 40°43′32.5″N 74°0′28″W

The Half Note was a jazz club in New York City, New York that flourished in two Manhattan locations – from 1957 to 1972 in SoHo (then known as the Village) at 289 Hudson Street at Spring Street and from 1972 to 1974 in Midtown at 149 West 54th Street, one block west of the Museum of Modern Art.

== History ==
The club was owned by the Canterino family: Michael Canterino (1932–2013) his brother, Sonny Canterino (né Dominic Canterino), their sister, Rosemarie Canterino, and their parents, Frank Canterino (né Francesco Canterino; 1906–1979) and Jean Canterino (née Concetta Italiano; 1906–1989). Judi Marie Canterino (née Derwin), a jazz vocalist, became a family owner by marrying Michael Canterino in 1960.

The Half Note was renowned for showcasing up and coming jazz musicians in the 1950s and 1960s, defraying costs with a Friday night live WABC radio show called Portraits in Jazz, hosted by Alan Grant (né Abraham Grochowsky; 1919–2012). The Half Note was one of a handful of nationally acclaimed Manhattan nightclubs, including the Village Vanguard, the Village Gate, the Five Spot, and Slug's Saloon – that featured renowned jazz artists on a regular basis.

Forgoing standard set times, musicians were allowed to play onstage for as long as they wanted to. In 1972, Mike and Sonny Canterino moved the Half Note Midtown to 149 West 54th Street, in what had formerly been a carriage house. Roger Brousso, a record distributor from Connecticut, invested $240,000 in the new venue.

Bookings included Budd Johnson and Buddy Tate, beboppers Al Cohn and Zoot Sims, avant-gardists John Coltrane, Charles Mingus, Wes Montgomery, Herbie Mann and Cannonball Adderley. Singers Anita O'Day, Billie Holiday, and, one evening Judy Garland also made an appearance. According to the book "Funny Valentine" by Matthew Ruddick, Chet Baker was a regular performer at The Half Note also. The Half Note closed January 1, 1975. Its second location, in Midtown, is now occupied by The London NYC hotel.

The movie Soul by Pixar features a reference to this club.

== Live recordings ==
- Donald Byrd – At the Half Note Cafe (Blue Note, 1960)
- Kenny Dorham Quintet - Live at the ''Half Note'' 1966 (Magnetic Records))
- Bob Brookmeyer, Clark Terry (Verve, 1973); OCLC 78273501
- John Coltrane – Live at the Half Note: One Down, One Up (Impulse!, 1965 [2005])
- Art Farmer Quartet featuring Jim Hall – Live at the Half-Note (Atlantic, 1963)
- Clifford Jordan – Half Note (SteepleChase, 1974 [1985])
- Richard "Groove" Holmes – Onsaya Joy (Flying Dutchman, 1975)
- Lee Konitz – Live at the Half Note (Verve, 1959 [1994])
- Wes Montgomery with the Wynton Kelly Trio – Smokin' at the Half Note (Verve, 1965)
- Zoot Sims, Al Cohn & Phil Woods – Jazz Alive! A Night at the Half Note (United Artists, 1959)
- Horace Silver – Live at the Half Note (Hi Hat, 1966)
- Lew Anderson Big Band Live (March 8, 1974)

Other live radio recordings have been released, including those by John Coltrane and Cannonball Adderley.

- New York City '65 (Vol. 1): John Coltrane, McCoy Tyner, Jimmy Garrison, Elvin Jones, Live at the Half Note, March 19, 1965; (NOTE: Track titled "One Up, One Down" was from a performance at Birdland, NYC, February 23, 1963) OCLC 812786959
- New York City '65 (Vol. 2): John Coltrane, McCoy Tyner, Jimmy Garrison, Elvin Jones, Live at the Half Note, April 2 and May 7, 1965; OCLC 832270670

On June 6, 1964, the Lennie Tristano quintet – with Lee Konitz, Warne Marsh, Sonny Dallas, and Nick Stabulas – was recorded and broadcast on television as "Jazz at the Half Note", an episode of the television series on CBS, Look Up and Live, narrated by William Hamilton of the Colgate Rochester Divinity School.
