= That's Right! =

Studio album by Nat Adderley
- Released: 1960
- Recorded: August 9 & September 15, 1960
- Genre: Jazz
- Label: Riverside

Nat Adderley chronology
| Work Song (1960) | That's Right! (1960) | Naturally! (1961) |

That's Right! is an album by jazz cornetist Nat Adderley and the Big Sax Section, released on the Riverside label and featuring Adderley with his brother Cannonball Adderley, Jimmy Heath, Charlie Rouse, Yusef Lateef, Tate Houston, Wynton Kelly, Jim Hall/Les Spann, Sam Jones, and Jimmy Cobb.

== Reception ==
The AllMusic review by Ron Wynn states, "Nat Adderley has seldom played with more fire, verve, and distinction as he does on That's Right!". The Penguin Guide to Jazz awarded the album 3½ stars, stating, "That's Right is a bit of an oddity, with Nat's cornet placed in front of what was billed, quite accurately, as the Big Sax Section".

Professional ratings
Review scores
| Source | Rating |
|---|---|
| AllMusic | 4.5/5 stars |
| The Penguin Guide to Jazz | 3.5/4 stars |

== Track listing ==
All compositions by Nat Adderley except as indicated

1. "The Old Country" (Curtis Lewis, Adderley) - 3:56
2. "Chordnation" (Jimmy Heath) - 6:11
3. "The Folks Who Live On the Hill" (Jerome Kern, Oscar Hammerstein II) - 4:15
4. "Tadd" (Barry Harris) - 4:17
5. "You Leave Me Breathless" (Frederick Hollander, Ralph Freed) - 4:16
6. "Night After Night" (Joe Bailey) - 2:29
7. "E.S.P." (Harris) - 3:49
8. "That's Right!" - 8:44

- Recorded in New York City on August 9 & September 15, 1960

== Personnel ==
- Nat Adderley – cornet
- Cannonball Adderley - alto saxophone
- Jimmy Heath, Charlie Rouse - tenor saxophone
- Yusef Lateef - tenor saxophone, flute, oboe
- Tate Houston - baritone saxophone
- Wynton Kelly - piano
- Jim Hall (tracks 2, 3 & 5), Les Spann (tracks 1, 4 & 6–8) - guitar
- Sam Jones - bass
- Jimmy Cobb - drums
