= Blue Soul (Blue Mitchell album) =

Studio album by Blue Mitchell
- Released: 1959
- Recorded: September 24, 28 & 30, 1959
- Studio: Reeves Sound Studios, NYC
- Genre: Jazz
- Length: 40:27
- Label: Riverside
- Producer: Orrin Keepnews

Blue Mitchell chronology
Out of the Blue (1959)	Blue Soul (1959)	Blue's Moods (1960)

Professional ratings
Review scores
Source	Rating
Allmusic	4.5/5 stars
DownBeat	3.5/5 stars
The Penguin Guide to Jazz Recordings	3.5/4 stars

Blue Soul is an album led by American trumpeter Blue Mitchell recorded and released in 1959 on the Riverside label.

== Reception ==
The Allmusic review by Michael G. Nastos awarded the album 4½ stars and stated "This is one of the most precious jazz recordings of a year that would soon give sway to the Blue Note sound, and is in many real and important ways as much of a prelude as any other statement. It's a must-have for all serious mainstream jazz fans".

== Track listing ==
All tracks are written by Blue Mitchell, except where noted.

No.	Title	Length
1.	"Minor Vamp" (Benny Golson)	3:42
2.	"The Head"	4:28
3.	"The Way You Look Tonight" (Dorothy Fields, Jerome Kern)	3:22
4.	"Park Avenue Petite" (Golson)	3:58
5.	"Top Shelf" (Jimmy Heath)	4:06
6.	"Waverly Street" (Heath)	5:00
7.	"Blue Soul"	4:12
8.	"Polka Dots and Moonbeams" (Johnny Burke, Jimmy Van Heusen)	5:50
9.	"Nica's Dream" (Horace Silver)	6:32

- Recorded September 24 (tracks 1 & 2), September 28 (tracks 5, 6, 8 & 9) and September 30 (tracks 3, 4 & 7), 1959.

== Personnel ==
- Blue Mitchell – trumpet
- Curtis Fuller – trombone (tracks 1, 2, 5, 6, 8 & 9)
- Jimmy Heath – tenor saxophone (tracks 1, 2, 5, 6, 8 & 9)
- Wynton Kelly – piano
- Sam Jones – bass
- Philly Joe Jones – drums
