= Full View =

Studio album by Wynton Kelly
- Released: 1967
- Recorded: September 2–30, 1966
- Studio: Plaza Sound Studios, New York City
- Genre: Jazz
- Length: 36:16
- Label: Milestone
- Producer: Orrin Keepnews

Wynton Kelly chronology
Blues on Purpose (1965)	Full View (1967)	Last Trio Session (1968)

Full View is an album by jazz pianist Wynton Kelly, recorded in 1966 and released on the Milestone label, featuring performances by Kelly with Ron McClure and Jimmy Cobb.

== Reception ==
The AllMusic review by Scott Yanow awarded the album 3 stars, stating "Pianist Wynton Kelly's next-to-last set as a leader featured him at a time when his influence was waning and he was overshadowed by more advanced players. However, Kelly's impact would begin to grow again after his death, when the Young Lions movement began in the early '80s".

Professional ratings
Review scores
Source	Rating
AllMusic	3/5 stars
The Penguin Guide to Jazz	3.5/4 stars

== Track listing ==
1. "I Want a Little Girl" (Murray Mencher, Billy Moll) – 4:42
2. "I Thought" (Rudy Stevenson) – 4:51
3. "What a Diff'rence a Day Made" (Stanley Adams, María Grever) – 4:47
4. "Autumn Leaves" (Joseph Kosma, Johnny Mercer, Jacques Prévert) – 3:51
5. "Don't Cha Hear Me Callin' to Ya" (Stevenson) – 4:27
6. "On a Clear Day (You Can See Forever)" (Burton Lane, Alan Jay Lerner) – 3:14
7. "Scufflin'" (Wynton Kelly) – 3:02
8. "Born to Be Blue" (Mel Tormé, Robert Wells) – 4:07
9. "Walk On By" (Burt Bacharach, Hal David) – 3:15

- Recorded in New York City in September 1966

== Personnel ==
- Wynton Kelly – piano
- Ron McClure – bass
- Jimmy Cobb – drums
