= New and Groovy =

Studio album by Johnny Lytle
- Released: 1966
- Recorded: January 21 & 22, 1966; New York City
- Genre: Jazz
- Labels: Tuba; LP 5002
- Producer: Orrin Keepnews

Johnny Lytle chronology
| The Loop (1965) | New and Groovy (1966) | Done It Again (1967) |

New and Groovy is the eighth album led by American jazz vibraphonist Johnny Lytle which was recorded in January 1966 for the Tuba label. Promo copies were pressed in 1966 but the date of release to the general public is unclear, that's either 1966 or 1967.

== Reception ==
Professional ratings
Review scores
| Source | Rating |
|---|---|
| Allmusic | 4/5 stars |

The Allmusic site awarded the album 4 stars stating "New and Groovy was appropriately titled. The soul of Lytle's vibes came with an ambience that's reflected in each one of these compositions".

== Track listing ==
All compositions by Johnny Lytle except as indicated

1. "The Snapper" – 2:19
2. "Summertime" (George Gershwin, Ira Gershwin, DuBose Heyward) – 4:15
3. "Selim" – 3:32
4. "The Shadow of Your Smile" (Johnny Mandel, Paul Francis Webster) – 3:39
5. "Come and Get It" – 4:19
6. "The Pulpit" – 4:00
7. "Too Close for Comfort" (Jerry Bock, Larry Holofcener, George David Weiss) – 3:48
8. "Chanukah" – 2:30
9. "Screamin' Loud" – 2:46
10. "El Marcel" – 3:55

== Personnel ==
- Johnny Lytle – vibraphone
- Wynton Kelly – piano (tracks 2–10)
- Milton Harris – organ
- George Duvivier – bass
- Jimmy Cobb (tracks 3, 5, 6, 8 & 9), William "Peppy" Hinnant (tracks 1, 2, 4, 7 & 10) – drums
- Montego Joe – congas
