= The Loop (Johnny Lytle album) =

Studio album by Johnny Lytle
- Released: 1966-04
- Recorded: December 30, 1964 and mid 1965; New York City
- Genre: Jazz
- Length: 36:59
- Labels: Tuba; LP 5001
- Producer: Orrin Keepnews

Johnny Lytle chronology
| The Village Caller! (1964) | The Loop (1966) | New and Groovy (1966) |

The Loop is the seventh album led by American jazz vibraphonist Johnny Lytle which was recorded in 1965 for the Tuba label.

== Reception ==
Professional ratings
Review scores
| Source | Rating |
|---|---|
| Allmusic | 4/5 stars |

The Allmusic site awarded the album 4 stars stating "this is one groovin' album in the vein of hard bop".

== Track listing ==
All compositions by Johnny Lytle except as indicated

1. "The Loop" – 2:18
2. "The More I See You" (Mack Gordon, Harry Warren) – 4:20
3. "The Man" – 2:42
4. "Time After Time" (Sammy Cahn, Jule Styne) – 4:28
5. "Big Bill" – 3:52
6. "Possum Grease" – 2:13
7. "Cristo Redentor" (Duke Pearson) – 4:44
8. "The Shyster" – 3:08
9. "My Romance" (Lorenz Hart, Richard Rodgers) – 4:02
10. "Hot Sauce" – 2:20

== Personnel ==
- Johnny Lytle – vibraphone, marimba
- Wynton Kelly – piano (tracks 2–6, 8 & 9)
- Milton Harris – organ (tracks 1 & 3–10)
- Bob Cranshaw (tracks 2–5 & 7–9), George Duvivier (tracks 1, 6 & 10) – bass
- William "Peppy" Hinnant – drums
- Willie Rodriguez – congas
