= Blue's Moods =

Studio album by Blue Mitchell
- Released: 1960
- Recorded: August 24 & 25, 1960
- Genre: Jazz
- Length: 40:41
- Label: Riverside
- Producer: Orrin Keepnews

Blue Mitchell chronology
Blue Soul (1959)	Blue's Moods (1960)	Smooth as the Wind (1960–61)

Blue's Moods is an album by American trumpeter Blue Mitchell recorded in 1960 and released on the Riverside label.

== Reception ==
Professional ratings
Review scores
Source	Rating
Allmusic	4/5 stars
The Penguin Guide to Jazz Recordings	3/4 stars
DownBeat	4/5 stars

The Allmusic review by Scott Yanow awarded the album 4 stars and stated, "The trumpeter is typically distinctive, swinging and inventive within the hard bop genre."

Writing for DownBeat, Frank Kofsky assigned the album 4 stars. He wrote, "Mitchell is a thoughtful musician . . . His playing, moreover, reflects the attainment of a measure of self assurance and restraint, hallmarks both of the mature artist."

== Track listing ==
All compositions by Blue Mitchell except as indicated

1. "I'll Close My Eyes" (Buddy Kaye, Billy Reid) - 5:56
2. "Avars" (Rocky Boyd) - 4:07
3. "Scrapple from the Apple" (Charlie Parker) - 4:00
4. "Kinda Vague" (Wynton Kelly, Blue Mitchell) - 6:28
5. "Sir John" - 6:06
6. "When I Fall in Love" (Edward Heyman, Victor Young) - 5:42
7. "Sweet Pumpkin" (Ronnell Bright) - 4:19
8. "I Wish I Knew" (Mack Gordon, Harry Warren) - 4:26

- Recorded in New York City on August 24 (tracks 5, 6 & 8) and August 25 (tracks 1–4 & 7), 1960.

== Personnel ==
- Blue Mitchell - trumpet, cornet
- Wynton Kelly - piano
- Sam Jones - bass
- Roy Brooks - drums
