= Easy Does It (Bobby Timmons album) =

Studio album by Bobby Timmons
- Released: 1961
- Recorded: March 13, 1961
- Genre: Jazz
- Length: 38:54
- Label: Riverside
- Producer: Orrin Keepnews

Bobby Timmons chronology
Soul Time (1960)	Easy Does It (1961)	In Person (1961)

Easy Does It is the third studio album by American jazz pianist Bobby Timmons, recorded in 1961 and released on the Riverside label.

== Reception ==
The DownBeat reviewer described it as "a model of unaffected, driving trio jazz". The AllMusic review by Scott Yanow awarded the album 4 stars, stating that "the music is excellent".

Professional ratings
Review scores
Source	Rating
AllMusic	4/5 stars
DownBeat	4/5 stars
The Penguin Guide to Jazz Recordings	3/4 stars

== Track listing ==
All compositions by Bobby Timmons except as indicated

1. "Easy Does It" – 4:53
2. "Old Devil Moon" (E.Y. Harburg, Burton Lane) – 4:38
3. "A Little Busy" – 5:52
4. "I Don't Stand a Ghost of a Chance with You" (Bing Crosby, Ned Washington, Victor Young) – 4:54
5. "Pretty Memory" – 3:32
6. "If You Could See Me Now" (Tadd Dameron, Carl Sigman) – 6:31
7. "I Thought About You" (Johnny Mercer, Jimmy Van Heusen) – 5:01
8. "Groovin' High" (Dizzy Gillespie) – 3:33

Recorded in New York City on March 13, 1961.

== Personnel ==
- Bobby Timmons – piano
- Sam Jones – bass
- Jimmy Cobb – drums
