= A.T.'s Delight =

Studio album by Art Taylor
- Released: March 1961
- Recorded: August 6, 1960; Van Gelder Studio, Englewood Cliffs
- Genre: Jazz
- Length: 37:00
- Label: Blue Note; BST 84047
- Producer: Alfred Lion

Art Taylor chronology
| Taylor's Tenors (1959) | A.T.'s Delight (1961) | Mr. A.T. (1991) |

A.T.'s Delight is an album by American drummer Art Taylor recorded in 1960 and released in 1961, his only recording as a leader for Blue Note.

== Reception ==
Professional ratings
Review scores
| Source | Rating |
|---|---|
| All About Jazz | 3.5/5 stars |
| AllMusic | 4/5 stars |
| MusicHound Jazz | 4.5/5 stars |
| Tom Hull – on the Web | B+ |

The editors of AllMusic awarded the album 4 stars, and reviewer Steve Leggett called it "bright and percussive," writing: "A.T.'s Delight is a solid outing, with a wonderfully nervous but completely focused energy".

Chris Hovan of MusicHound Jazz described the album as "a brilliantly arranged session," and noted the "spirited exchanges between Taylor and conga drummer Potato Valdez," as well as "the appearance of two stellar Kenny Dorham compositions."

Writing for Coda, Duck Baker commented: "Stanley Turrentine and seldom-heard trumpeter Dave Burns are in top form, the rhythm section is fantastic, and excellent arrangements of challenging jazz fare... make Delight a must."

== Track listing ==
1. "Syeeda's Song Flute" (John Coltrane) – 6:35
2. "Epistrophy" (Kenny Clarke, Thelonious Monk) – 6:52
3. "Move" (Denzil Best) – 5:49
4. "High Seas" (Kenny Dorham) – 6:49
5. "Cookoo and Fungi" (Art Taylor) – 5:33
6. "Blue Interlude" (Dorham) – 5:22

== Personnel ==
- Art Taylor – drums
- Dave Burns – trumpet (tracks 1–4 & 6)
- Stanley Turrentine – tenor saxophone
- Wynton Kelly – piano (tracks 1–4 & 6)
- Paul Chambers – bass
- Carlos "Patato" Valdes – conga (tracks 2, 3 & 5)
