= Kelly at Midnight =

Studio album by Wynton Kelly
- Released: 1960
- Recorded: April 27, 1960
- Studio: Bell Sound (New York City)
- Genre: Jazz
- Length: 32:32
- Label: Vee-Jay
- Producer: Sid McCoy

Wynton Kelly chronology
Kelly Great (1959)	Kelly at Midnight (1960)	Wynton Kelly! (1961)

Kelly at Midnight is an album by jazz pianist Wynton Kelly released on the Vee-Jay label featuring performances by Kelly with Paul Chambers and Philly Joe Jones recorded in 1960.

== Reception ==
The AllMusic review by Ron Wynn states "This 1960 date was a first-rate trio outing with Kelly given the space to demonstrate subtlety and flair, harmonic precision, melodic brilliance and rhythmic diversity".

Professional ratings
Review scores
Source	Rating
AllMusic	3/5 stars
The Penguin Guide to Jazz	3.5/4 stars

== Track listing ==
All compositions by Wynton Kelly except as indicated

No.	Title	Length
1.	"Temperance"	7:31
2.	"Weird Lullaby" (Babs Gonzales)	7:11
3.	"On Stage" (Rudy Stevenson)	5:13
4.	"Skatin" (Stevenson)	5:48
5.	"Pot Luck"	6:48

- Recorded at Bell Sound Studios in New York City on April 27, 1960

== Personnel ==
- Wynton Kelly – piano
- Paul Chambers – bass
- Philly Joe Jones – drums
- Nat Hentoff – liner notes
