= Here's Lee Morgan =

Studio album by Lee Morgan
- Released: Mid September 1960
- Recorded: February 2,3 & 8, 1960
- Studio: Bell Sound (New York City)
- Genre: Jazz
- Length: 70:54
- Label: Vee-Jay
- Producer: Sid McCoy

Lee Morgan chronology
Another Monday Night at Birdland (1959)	Here's Lee Morgan (1960)	Lee-Way (1960)

Here's Lee Morgan is an album by jazz trumpeter Lee Morgan originally released on the Vee-Jay label. It was recorded on February 8, 1960, and features performances by Morgan with Clifford Jordan, Wynton Kelly, Paul Chambers and Art Blakey.

== Reception ==
The Allmusic review by Scott Yanow awarded the album 4 stars stating "The music is good solid hard bop that finds Lee Morgan (already a veteran at age 21) coming out of the Clifford Brown tradition to display his own rapidly developing style. Matched with Clifford Jordan on tenor, pianist Wynton Kelly, bassist Paul Chambers and drummer Art Blakey, Morgan's album could pass for a Jazz Messengers set."

Professional ratings
Review scores
Source	Rating
Allmusic	4/5 stars
The Penguin Guide to Jazz	3/4 stars

== Track listing ==
1. "Terrible "T"" (Morgan) - 5:17
2. "Mogie" (Morgan) - 7:42
3. "I'm a Fool to Want You" (Herron, Sinatra, Wolf) - 5:36
4. "Running Brook" (Shorter) - 6:03
5. "Off Spring" (Jackson) - 6:13
6. "Bess" (Morgan) - 6:23
7. "Terrible "T"" [Take 7] (Morgan) - 5:42 Bonus track on CD reissue
8. "Terrible "T"" [Take 6] (Morgan) - 6:53 Bonus track on CD reissue
9. "Mogie" [Take 2] (Morgan) - 7:25 Bonus track on CD reissue
10. "Mogie" [Take 1 Mono] (Morgan) - 7:31 Bonus track on CD reissue
11. "I'm a Fool to Want You" [Take 1] (Herron, Sinatra, Wolf) - 5:54 Bonus track on CD reissue
12. "I'm a Fool to Want You" [Take 2] (Herron, Sinatra, Wolf) - 5:43
13. "Running Brook" [Take 9] (Shorter) - 6:16 Bonus track on CD reissue
14. "Running Brook" [Take 4] (Shorter) - 6:50 Bonus track on CD reissue
15. "Off Spring" [Take 7] (Jackson) - 6:39 Bonus track on CD reissue
16. "Bess" [Take 3] (Morgan) - 6:38 Bonus track on CD reissue

- Recorded at Bell Sound Studio B, NYC, February 8, 1960

== Personnel ==
- Lee Morgan - trumpet
- Clifford Jordan - tenor saxophone
- Wynton Kelly - piano
- Paul Chambers - bass
- Art Blakey - drums
