= Out of the Blue (Sonny Red album) =

Studio album by Sonny Red
- Released: 1960
- Recorded: December 5, 1959; January 23, 1960
- Studio: Van Gelder Studio; Englewood Cliffs, New Jersey
- Genre: Jazz
- Length: 42:50 (LP); 72:50 (CD)
- Label: Blue Note; BLP 4032
- Producer: Alfred Lion

Sonny Red chronology
| Two Altos (1959) | Out of the Blue (1960) | Breezing (1960) |

Out of the Blue is an album by American jazz saxophonist Sonny Red recorded on December 5, 1959 and January 23, 1960 and released on Blue Note in 1960.

== Release history ==
In 1996, it was released on CD, as a limited edition, with five bonus tracks from the same sessions.

== Reception ==
Professional ratings
Review scores
| Source | Rating |
|---|---|
| AllMusic | 4.5/5 stars |

The AllMusic review by Scott Yanow states, "Sonny Red, a fine altoist inspired by Charlie Parker and Jackie McLean, never really made it in jazz, and some of his recordings are rather uninspired. However, that does not hold true for his Blue Note album... He performs mostly little-known standards (along with six of his originals) and displays a fair amount of originality and a great deal of potential that was never really fulfilled. Recommended."

== Track listing ==
All tracks are written by Sonny Red, except as noted.

Side 1
| No. | Title | Writer(s) | Date recorded | Length |
|---|---|---|---|---|
| 1. | "Bluesville" | | December 5, 1959 | 5:53 |
| 2. | "Stay as Sweet as You Are" | Gordon, Revel | December 5, 1959 | 6:16 |
| 3. | "I've Never Been in Love Before" | Loesser | December 5, 1959 | 5:24 |
| 4. | "Nadia" | | December 5, 1959 | 4:10 |

Side 2
| No. | Title | Writer(s) | Date recorded | Length |
|---|---|---|---|---|
| 1. | "Blues in the Pocket" | | December 5, 1959 | 6:32 |
| 2. | "Alone Too Long" | Fields, Schwartz | December 5, 1959 | 3:00 |
| 3. | "The Lope" | | January 23, 1960 | 5:16 |
| 4. | "Stairway to the Stars" | Malneck, Parish, Signorelli | January 23, 1960 | 6:19 |

CD reissue bonus tracks
| No. | Title | Writer(s) | Date recorded | Length |
|---|---|---|---|---|
| 9. | "Crystal" | | January 23, 1960 | 5:38 |
| 10. | "Lost April" | DeLange, Newman, Hubert Spencer | January 23, 1960 | 6:49 |
| 11. | "You're Sensational" | Porter | January 23, 1960 | 6:30 |
| 12. | "Blues for Kokee" | | January 23, 1960 | 5:36 |
| 13. | "You're Driving Me Crazy" | Donaldson | January 23, 1960 | 5:27 |

== Personnel ==
=== Musicians ===
==== December 5, 1959 ====
- Sonny Red – alto saxophone
- Wynton Kelly – piano
- Sam Jones – bass
- Roy Brooks – drums

==== January 23, 1960 ====
- Sonny Red – alto saxophone
- Wynton Kelly – piano
- Paul Chambers – bass
- Jimmy Cobb – drums

=== Technical personnel ===
- Alfred Lion – producer
- Rudy Van Gelder – recording engineer, mastering
- Reid Miles – cover design
- Francis Wolff – photography
- Ira Gitler – liner notes

== Charts ==
Chart performance for Out of the Blue
| Chart (2022) | Peak position |
|---|---|
| Belgian Albums (Ultratop Wallonia) | 169 |
| German Albums (Offizielle Top 100) | 45 |
| Scottish Albums (OCC) | 98 |
| Swiss Albums (Schweizer Hitparade) | 65 |
