= The New Scene of King Curtis =

Studio album by King Curtis
- Released: 1960
- Recorded: April 21, 1960
- Studio: Van Gelder Studio, Englewood Cliffs, NJ
- Genre: Jazz
- Length: 40:06
- Label: New Jazz; NJ 8237
- Producer: The Sound of America

King Curtis chronology
Azure (1960)	The New Scene of King Curtis (1960)	Soul Meeting (1960)

The New Scene of King Curtis is an album by saxophonist King Curtis recorded for the New Jazz label in 1960. The album features Nat Adderley who performed under the pseudonym "Little Brother" on the original release due to contractual restrictions.

== Reception ==
Professional ratings
Review scores
Source	Rating
AllMusic	4/5 stars

Eugene Chadbourne's review on AllMusic states: "for the 1960 recording, Curtis is accompanied by two-thirds of a famous Miles Davis rhythm section as well as a drummer who eventually became prominent on the Parisian swing scene ... Chambers and Kelly can not be too strongly emphasized as components of this brilliant group, carrying over their assets to the Curtis session as if shifting boxes from one side of a garage to another".

== Track listing ==
All compositions by King Curtis except where noted

1. "Da-Duh-Dah" – 5:11
2. "Have You Heard?" (Curtis, Herman Foster) – 10:23
3. "Willow Weep for Me" (Ann Ronell) – 5:24
4. "Little Brother Soul" – 8:35
5. "In a Funky Groove" – 10:49

== Personnel ==
=== Performance ===
- King Curtis – tenor saxophone
- Little Brother – trumpet (tracks 1–3 & 5)
- Wynton Kelly – piano
- Paul Chambers – bass
- Oliver Jackson – drums

=== Production ===
- The Sound of America – producer
- Rudy Van Gelder – engineer
