= Undiluted =

Studio album by Wynton Kelly
- Released: 1965
- Recorded: February 5, 1965
- Studio: Van Gelder Studio, Englewood Cliffs, New Jersey
- Genre: Jazz
- Length: 34:27
- Label: Verve
- Producer: Creed Taylor

Wynton Kelly chronology
It's All Right! (1964)	Undiluted (1965)	Smokin' at the Half Note (1965)

Undiluted is an album by jazz pianist Wynton Kelly that was recorded in 1965 and released by Verve label with Paul Chambers and Jimmy Cobb.

== Reception ==
The Allmusic review awarded the album 3 stars.

Professional ratings
Review scores
Source	Rating
Allmusic	3/5 stars
Down Beat	3/5 stars

== Track listing ==
1. "Bobo" (Wynton Kelly) - 4:02
2. "Swingin Till the Girls Come Home" (Oscar Pettiford) - 6:33
3. "My Ship" (Kurt Weill, Ira Gershwin) - 3:51
4. "Out Front" (Rudy Stevenson) - 4:00
5. "Never" (Stevenson) - 4:04
6. "Blues on Purpose" (Stevenson) - 4:52
7. "If You Could See Me Now" (Tadd Dameron, Carl Sigman) - 3:48
8. "Six Eight" (Stevenson) - 4:59

- Recorded at Rudy Van Gelder Studio in Englewood Cliffs, NJ, on February 5, 1965

== Personnel ==
- Wynton Kelly - piano
- Paul Chambers - bass
- Jimmy Cobb - drums
- Rudy Stevenson - flute (track 1)
- Willie Bobo - percussion (track 1)
