= If You Could See Me Now (1946 song) =

1946 jazz standard

"If You Could See Me Now" is a 1946 jazz standard composed by Tadd Dameron. He wrote it for vocalist Sarah Vaughan, a frequent collaborator. The song's lyrics were written by Carl Sigman and it became one of Vaughan's signature songs, inducted into the Grammy Hall of Fame in 1998. Dameron himself recorded a version, featuring vocalist Barbara Winfield, for his 1962 album The Magic Touch.

== Notable recordings ==
- Sarah Vaughan's 1946 original recording was released through Musicraft Records. The song also appeared on her 1981 album Send in the Clowns with the Count Basie Orchestra.
- Sonny Stitt on his 1955 album Sonny Stitt Plays Arrangements from the Pen of Quincy Jones
- Randy Weston recorded the composition in 1956/57 for his album Trio and Solo
- Gil Evans recorded a version for his 1957 album Gil Evans & Ten
- Chet Baker recorded it for his 1959 album Chet.
- Yusef Lateef recorded it on his 1959 album Cry! - Tender
- Bobby Timmons from his album Easy Does It (1961)
- Milt Jackson recorded it on his 1962 Big Bags album
- Bill Evans recorded his version of the song for his 1962 album Moon Beams and also on his Trio '65 album
- Sheila Jordan recorded it on her 1963 debut album Portrait of Sheila
- Carmen McRae recorded it on 1964's Bittersweet
- Red Garland recorded a quintet version that appeared on his Soul Burnin' album, released in 1964
- Wynton Kelly recorded a trio version that appeared on his 1965 album Undiluted
- Wes Montgomery on the live album Smokin' at the Half Note (1965)
- Dexter Gordon recorded it on his 1970 album The Jumpin' Blues
- John Abercrombie and John Scofield included the song in their 1984 album Solar.
- Jaco Pastorius covered the song in 1985 during a televised concert in Belgium.
- Jacky Terrasson and Tom Harrell included the song in their 1991 Moon and Sand album.
- Mel Tormé recorded a notable version in 1995 with Canadian trombonist and bandleader Rob McConnell.
