= Jimmy Cobb =

American jazz drummer (1929–2020)

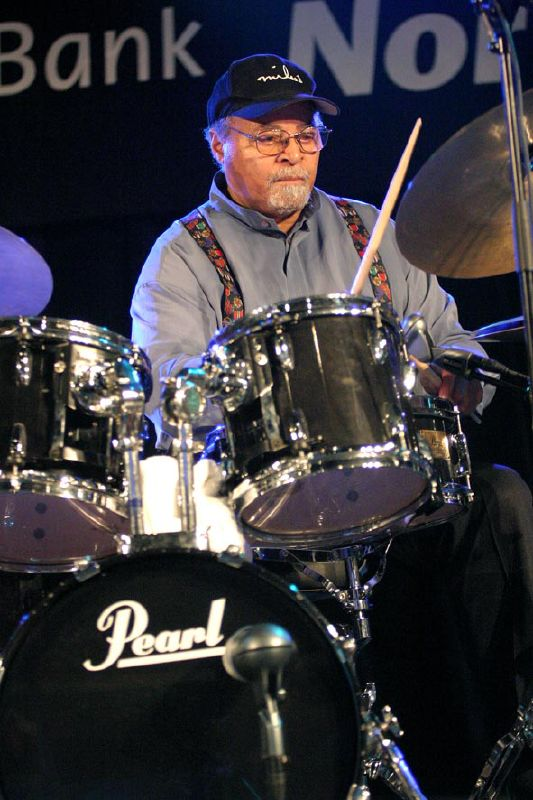
- Cobb performing c. 2008

Background information
- Born: Wilbur James Cobb; January 20, 1929; Washington, D.C., U.S.
- Died: May 24, 2020 (aged 91) Manhattan, New York City, U.S.
- Genre: Jazz
- Occupation: Drummer
- Years active: 1949–2020

Wilbur James "Jimmy" Cobb (January 20, 1929 – May 24, 2020) was an American jazz drummer. He was part of Miles Davis's First Great Sextet. He was awarded an NEA Jazz Masters Fellowship in 2009.

== Early life ==
Cobb was born in Washington, D.C., on January 20, 1929. Before he began his music career, he listened to jazz albums and stayed awake into the late hours of the night to listen to Symphony Sid broadcasting from New York City. Raised Catholic, he was also exposed to Church music.

Cobb started his touring career in 1950 with the saxophonist Earl Bostic. He subsequently performed with vocalist Dinah Washington, pianist Wynton Kelly, saxophonist Cannonball Adderley, bassist Keter Betts, Frank Wess, Leo Parker, and Charlie Rouse. His website also recounts his gigs with Billie Holiday, Pearl Bailey, and Dizzy Gillespie that took place before 1957.

== Career ==
Cobb joined Miles Davis in 1958 as part of the latter's First Great Sextet, after Adderley recommended him to Davis. Cobb's best-known recorded work is on Davis' Kind of Blue (1959). Cobb was the last surviving player from the sessions, a distinction that, after Davis's death in 1991, he held for almost three decades. He also played on other Davis albums, including Sketches of Spain (1960), Someday My Prince Will Come (1961), Miles Davis at Carnegie Hall (1962), In Person Friday and Saturday Nights at the Blackhawk, Complete, and briefly on Porgy and Bess (1959) and Sorcerer. His subtle and understated demeanor drew the admiration of many including Davis. However, this also meant that he did not get the same level of recognition that his fellow drummers would. Cobb had the propensity to eschew publicity and did not record his first set as bandleader until 1983, with the release of So Nobody Else Can Hear.

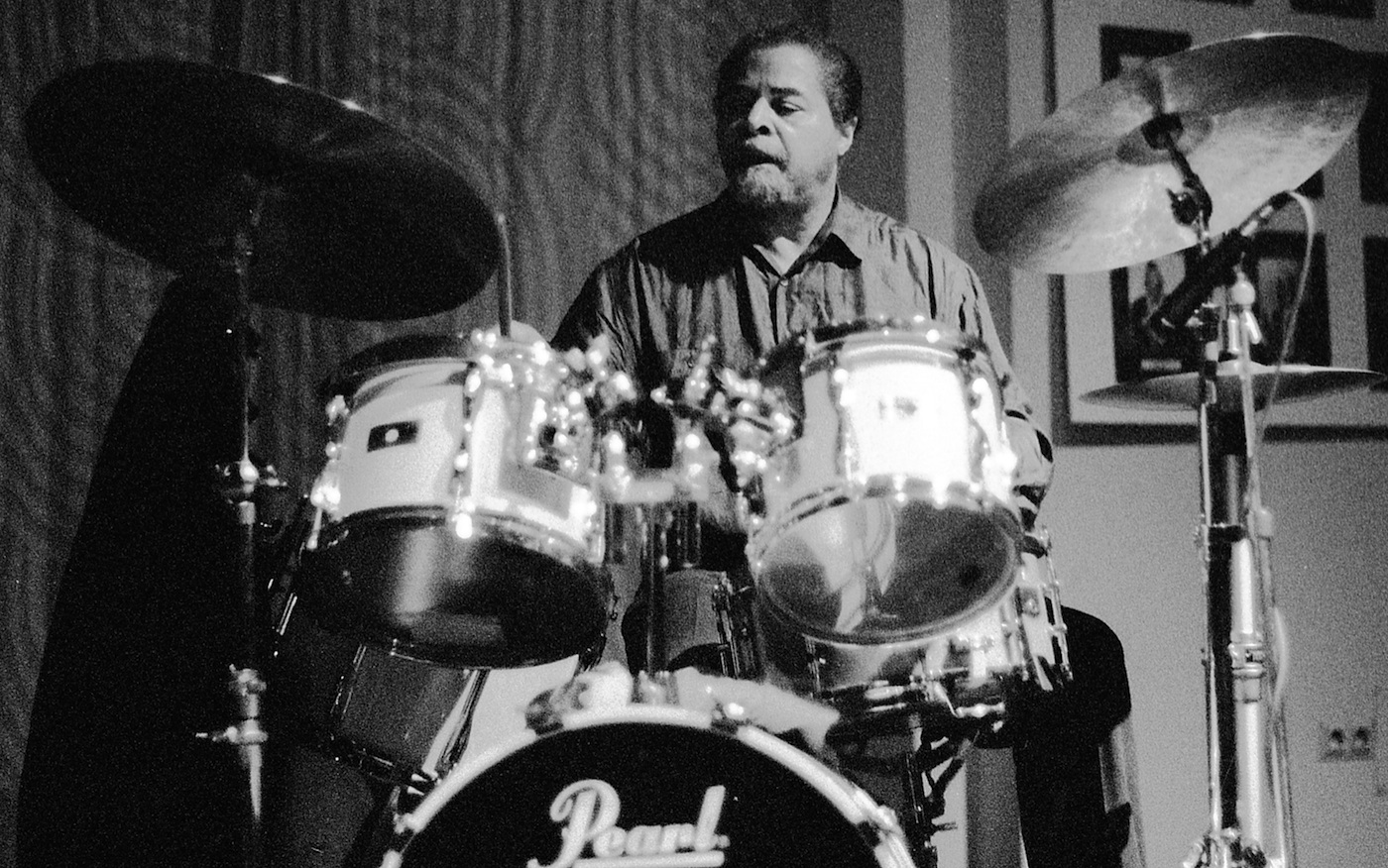
Jimmy Cobb with the Nat Adderley Quintet, 1993

Cobb left the band in 1963, when Tony Williams was brought in by Davis. He formed a trio with pianist Wynton Kelly and bassist Paul Chambers, both of whom were part of Davis' rhythm section. The group toured and recorded as a trio, and also worked with Kenny Burrell, Wes Montgomery, Joe Henderson, J. J. Johnson and others. Chambers died in 1969, though Kelly and Cobb had occasionally used other bassists in the late 1960s as Chambers' health declined. Kelly died in 1971. Cobb went on to join the Great Jazz Trio, together with Hank Jones on piano and Eddie Gómez on bass. He also toured with Sarah Vaughan during the 1970s, and taught at Stanford University, University of North Carolina at Greensboro, and Berklee College of Music. He played in a tribute band called "4 Generations of Miles", together with Ron Carter (bass), Mike Stern (guitar), and George Coleman (tenor saxophone).

During his career, Cobb worked with Bill Evans, Clark Terry, Stan Getz, John Coltrane, Wes Montgomery, Art Pepper, Wayne Shorter, Benny Golson, Gil Evans, Kenny Dorham, Frank Strozier, Bobby Timmons, Booker Little, Johnny Griffin, Akiko Tsuruga, Bertha Hope, Hamiet Bluiett, Nat Adderley, Mark Murphy, Jon Hendricks, Joe Henderson, Fathead Newman, Geri Allen, Larry Willis, Walter Booker, Red Garland, Richie Cole, Ernie Royal, Jerome Richardson, Jimmy Cleveland, Philly Joe Jones, Sonny Stitt, Nancy Wilson, Ricky Ford, Richard Wyands, John Webber, and Peter Bernstein, among many others.

== Awards ==
In June 2008, Jimmy Cobb was the recipient of the Don Redman Heritage Award. On October 17, 2008, Cobb was one of six artists to receive the 2009 National Endowment for the Arts NEA Jazz Masters award.

== Personal life and death ==
Cobb was married to Eleana Steinberg Cobb until his death. Together, they had two daughters, Serena and Jaime, both of whom survived him.

Cobb died on May 24, 2020, at his home in Manhattan. He was 91 and had been suffering from lung cancer.

== Discography ==
=== As leader/co-leader ===
- So Nobody Else Can Hear (Contempo Vibrato, 1983) – rec. 1981
- Encounter with Ada Montellanico (Philology, 1994)
- Only for the Pure of Heart (Fable/Lightyear, 1998) – live
- Four Generations of Miles: A Live Tribute to Miles with George Coleman, Mike Stern, Ron Carter (Chesky, 2002)
- Jimmy Cobb Trio (Azzurra Music, 2002)
- Cobb's Groove (Milestone, 2003)
- Yesterdays (RteesanCobb Music, 2003)
- Taking a Chance on Love featuring Marco Tamburini (Sound Hills, 2004)
- Tribute to Wynton Kelly & Paul Chambers (Sound Hills, 2004)
- Cobb Is Back in Italy! (Azzurra Music, 2005)
- Marsalis Music Honors Series: Jimmy Cobb (Marsalis/Rounder, 2006) – rec. 2005
- New York Time (Chesky, 2006)
- Cobb's Corner (Chesky, 2007)
- Jazz in the Key of Blue (Chesky, 2009)
- Live at Smalls (Smallslive, 2010)
- Remembering Miles 'Tribute to Miles Davis' (Sony Music, 2011)
- The Original Mob (Smoke Sessions, 2014)
- The Super Trio, Softly, As in a Morning Sunrise with Massimo Farao, Ron Carter (Venus, 2018)
- This I Dig of You (Smoke Sessions, 2019) – live
- Remembering U featuring Roy Hargrove (Jimmy Cobb World, 2019) – rec. 2016

=== As sideman ===
With Cannonball Adderley

- Sophisticated Swing (EmArcy, 1956)
- Cannonball Enroute (EmArcy, 1957)
- Cannonball's Sharpshooters (EmArcy, 1958)
- Jump for Joy (EmArcy, 1958)
- Cannonball Adderley Quintet in Chicago (Mercury, 1959)
- Cannonball Takes Charge (Riverside, 1959)

With Nat Adderley

- That's Right! (Riverside, 1960)
- On the Move (Theresa, 1983)
- Blue Autumn (Theresa, 1983)
- We Remember Cannon (In + Out, 1989)
- Autumn Leaves (Sweet Basil, 1990)
- Talkin' About You (Landmark, 1991) – rec. 1990
- Work Song: Live at Sweet Basil (Sweet Basil, 1993) – rec. 1990

With Lorez Alexandria

- Alexandria the Great (Impulse!, 1964)
- More of the Great Lorez Alexandria (Impulse!, 1964)

With John Coltrane

- Standard Coltrane (Prestige, 1962) – rec. 1958
- Stardust (Prestige, 1963) – rec. 1958
- Kenny Burrell and John Coltrane (Prestige, 1963) – rec. 1958
- Bahia (Prestige, 1965) – rec. 1958
- Giant Steps (on "Naima" only, Atlantic, 1960) – rec. 1959
- Coltrane Jazz (Atlantic, 1961) – rec. 1959–1960

With Miles Davis

- Porgy and Bess (Columbia, 1959) – rec. 1958
- 1958 Miles (CBS/Sony, 1974) – rec. 1958
- Jazz at the Plaza (Columbia, 1973) – rec. 1958
- Kind of Blue (Columbia, 1959)
- Sketches of Spain (Columbia, 1960) – rec. 1959–1960
- Someday My Prince Will Come (Columbia, 1961)
- In Person Friday and Saturday Nights at the Blackhawk, Complete (Columbia, 2003) – rec. 1961
- Miles & Monk at Newport (Columbia, 1964) – rec. 1958–1963
- Miles Davis at Newport 1955–1975: The Bootleg Series Vol. 4 (Columbia Legacy, 2015) – rec. 1955–1975

With Ricky Ford

- Flying Colors (Muse, 1980)
- Tenor for the Times (Muse, 1981)
- Interpretations (Muse, 1982)
- Future's Gold (Muse, 1983)
- Shorter Ideas (Muse, 1984)
- Saxotic Stomp (Muse, 1987)

With Benny Golson

- Pop + Jazz = Swing (Audio Fidelity, 1961) – also released as Just Jazz!
- Turning Point (Mercury, 1962)

With Joe Henderson

- Four (Verve, 1994) – rec. 1968
- Straight, No Chaser (Verve, 1996) – rec. 1968

With Hank Jones

- The Great Jazz Trio, Threesome (Eastworld, 1982)
- The Great Jazz Trio, What's New (Eastworld, 1982)
- The Great Jazz Trio, The Club New Yorker (Denon, 1983)
- The Great Jazz Trio, Ambrosia (Denon, 1983)
- The Great Jazz Trio, N.Y.Sophisticate: a Tribute to Duke Ellington (Denon, 1984)
- The Great Jazz Trio, Monk's Mood (Denon, 1984)
- West of 5th (Chesky, 2006)

With Wynton Kelly

- Kelly Blue (Riverside, 1959)
- Wynton Kelly! (Vee-Jay, 1961)
- Someday My Prince Will Come (Vee-Jay, 1961)
- Comin' in the Back Door (Verve, 1963)
- It's All Right! (Verve, 1964)
- Undiluted (Verve, 1965)
- Blues on Purpose (Xanadu, 1965)
- Full View (Riverside, 1967)
- Last Trio Session (Delmark, 1968)

With Wes Montgomery

- Full House (Riverside, 1962)
- Boss Guitar (Riverside, 1963)
- Guitar on the Go (Riverside, 1963) – rec. 1959–1963
- Smokin' at the Half Note (Verve, 1965)
- Willow Weep for Me (Verve, 1969) – rec. 1965
- The Alternative Wes Montgomery (Riverside, 1982) – rec. 1960–1963
- Smokin' Guitar (Toko, 1994) – rec. 1965

With David "Fathead" Newman

- Still Hard Times (Muse, 1982)
- Song for the New Man (HighNote, 2004) – rec. 2003

With Sonny Red

- Out of the Blue (Blue Note, 1960)
- The Mode (Jazzland (1962) – rec. 1961
- Images (Jazzland, 1962) – rec. 1961

With Shirley Scott

- For Members Only (Impulse!, 1963)
- On a Clear Day (Impulse!, 1966)

With Bobby Timmons

- This Here Is Bobby Timmons (Riverside, 1960)
- Easy Does It (Riverside, 1961)
- From the Bottom (Riverside, 1970) – rec. 1964
- The Soul Man! (Prestige, 1966)
- Got to Get It! (Milestone, 1967)

With Sarah Vaughan

- Live in Japan (Mainstream, 1975)
- Ronnie Scott's Presents Sarah Vaughan Live (Pye, 1977)

With others

- Pepper Adams-Donald Byrd Quintet, Out of this World (Warwick, 1961)
- Peter and Will Anderson, Peter And Will Anderson featuring Jimmy Cobb (Outside In, 2020)
- Félix Lemerle, Blues for the End Of Time (Tzim Tzum Records, 2022)
- Toshiko Akiyoshi, Toshiko Mariano and Her Big Band (Vee-Jay, 1964)
- Geri Allen, Timeless Portraits and Dreams (Telarc, 2006)
- Dorothy Ashby, Soft Winds (Jazzland, 1961)
- Kenny Barron and John Hicks, Rhythm-a-Ning (Candid, 1989)
- Walter Benton, Out of This World (Jazzland, 1960)
- Federico Bonifazi, You'll See (SteepleChase, 2016)
- Walter Bishop Jr., The Walter Bishop Jr. Trio / 1965 (Prestige, 1965)
- Nick Brignola, Burn Brigade (Bee Hive, 1979)
- Paul Chambers, Go (Vee-Jay, 1959)
- Al Cohn, Son of Drum Suite (RCA Victor, 1960)
- Joey DeFrancesco, Wonderful! Wonderful! (HighNote, 2012)
- Kenny Dorham, Blue Spring (Riverside, 1959)
- Kenny Drew, Lite Flite (SteepleChase, 1977)
- Curtis Fuller, Soul Trombone (Impulse!, 1961)
- Eddie Gómez Trio, Live in Japan (Mezgo Music, 1996)
- Paul Gonsalves, Gettin' Together (Jazzland, 1960)
- Bunky Green, My Babe (Vee-Jay, 1965) – recorded in 1963
- Bill Hardman, Saying Something (Savoy, 1961)
- John Hendricks, Freddie Freeloader (Denon, 1990)
- John Hicks and Elise Wood, Luminous (Nilva, 1985)
- Hubert Laws, The Laws of Jazz (Atlantic, 1964)
- Johnny Lytle, New and Groovy (Tuba, 1966)
- Harold Mabern, To Love and Be Loved (Smoke Sessions, 2017)
- Pat Martino, Desperado (Prestige, 1970)
- Ronnie Mathews, Legacy (Bee Hive, 1979)
- Billy Mitchell, De Lawd's Blues (Xanadu, 1980)
- Frank Morgan, Quiet Fire (Contemporary, 1991) with Bud Shank
- Art Pepper, Gettin' Together (Contemporary, 1960)
- Jimmy Raney, Here's That Raney Day (Ahead, 1980)
- Wayne Shorter, Introducing Wayne Shorter (Vee-Jay, 1959)
- Don Sleet, All Members (Jazzland, 1961)
- Sonny Stitt, In Style (Muse, 1982)
- Teri Thornton, Devil May Care (Riverside, 1961)
- Norris Turney, Big, Sweet 'n Blue with Larry Willis and Walter Booker (Mapleshade, 1993)
- Phil Upchurch, Feeling Blue (Milestone, 1967)
- Cedar Walton, Midnight Waltz (Venus, 2005)
- Dinah Washington, For Those in Love (EmArcy, 1955)
- C. I. Williams, When Alto Was King (Mapleshade, 1997)
