= Straight Ahead (David "Fathead" Newman album) =

Studio album by David "Fathead" Newman
- Released: 1961
- Recorded: December 21, 1960
- Studio: Atlantic Studio A, NYC
- Genre: Jazz
- Length: 38:04
- Label: Atlantic; SD 1366
- Producer: Nesuhi Ertegun

David "Fathead" Newman chronology
The Sound of the Wide Open Spaces!!!! (1960)	Straight Ahead (1961)	Fathead Comes On (1961)

Straight Ahead is an album by American saxophonist David "Fathead" Newman, featuring performances recorded in 1960 for the Atlantic label.

== Reception ==
Professional ratings
Review scores
Source	Rating
AllMusic	4/5 stars
DownBeat	4/5 stars

The contemporaneous DownBeat reviewer, Leonard Feather, described the album as "a modest, honest, most agreeable set", and highlighted Kelly's contributions, which he described as "amounting at times to a virtual duet with Newman". AllMusic awarded the album 4 stars, stating, "There is nothing particularly innovative about this recording, but the level of expertise and musical maturity displayed here is truly astonishing. This is simply straight-ahead hard bop performed by some of the finest musicians in 1960s jazz".

== Track listing ==
All compositions by David "Fathead" Newman except as indicated

1. "Batista's Groove" (Marcus Belgrave) - 7:25
2. "Skylark" (Hoagy Carmichael, Johnny Mercer) - 4:39
3. "Night of Nisan" - 7:59
4. "Cousin Slim" - 7:07
5. "Summertime" (George Gershwin, Ira Gershwin, DuBose Heyward) - 6:34
6. "Congo Chant" - 4:20

== Personnel ==
- David "Fathead" Newman – tenor saxophone, alto saxophone, flute
- Wynton Kelly – piano
- Paul Chambers – bass
- Charlie Persip – drums
