= Soul Meeting (King Curtis album) =

Studio album by King Curtis
- Released: 1960
- Recorded: September 18, 1960
- Studio: Van Gelder Studio, Englewood Cliffs, New Jersey, USA
- Genre: Jazz
- Length: 32:55
- Label: Prestige; 7222, PRLP 7222
- Producer: Esmond Edwards, Ozzie Cadena

King Curtis chronology
The New Scene of King Curtis (1960)	Soul Meeting (1960)	Soul Battle (1962)

Soul Meeting is the sixth album by saxophonist King Curtis and was released on the Prestige label in 1960 as 7222 and PRLP 7222. It features performances by Curtis, Nat Adderley, Wynton Kelly, Sam Jones, Paul Chambers, Belton Evans, and Oliver Jackson.

Professional ratings
Review scores
Source	Rating
Allmusic	3.5/5 stars

== Track listing ==
"Soul Meeting"
Title track

All compositions by King Curtis, except where noted.

1. "Soul Meeting" – 7:01
2. "Lazy Soul" – 7:14
3. "All the Way" (Jimmy Van Heusen, Sammy Cahn) – 5:30
4. "Jeep's Blues" (Duke Ellington, Johnny Hodges) – 6:55
5. "What Is This Thing Called Love?" (Cole Porter) – 5:42
6. "Do You Have Soul Now?" – 6:25

== Personnel ==
=== Musicians ===
- King Curtis – tenor saxophone
- Nat Adderley – trumpet, cornet
- Wynton Kelly – piano
- Sam Jones – bass
- Paul Chambers – bass
- Belton Evans – drums
- Oliver Jackson – drums

=== Technical ===
- Esmond Edwards – photography
- Don Schlitten – cover design
- Rudy Van Gelder – recording
