= Someday My Prince Will Come (Wynton Kelly album) =

Studio album by Wynton Kelly
- Released: 1961
- Recorded: August 12, 1959, April 27, 1960, and July 20 & 21, 1961
- Studio: Bell Sound (New York City)
- Genre: Jazz
- Length: 78:06 (reissue with bonus tracks)
- Label: Vee-Jay
- Producer: Sid McCoy

Wynton Kelly chronology
Wynton Kelly! (1961)	Someday My Prince Will Come (1961)	Comin' in the Back Door (1963)

Someday My Prince Will Come is an album by jazz pianist Wynton Kelly featuring performances by Kelly with Paul Chambers or Sam Jones and Jimmy Cobb recorded in 1961 and one track with Lee Morgan and Wayne Shorter from 1959 released by the Vee-Jay label in 1961. Additional performances from these sessions were released as Wynton Kelly!.

== Reception ==
The Allmusic review by Scott Yanow awarded the album 4½ stars and states "His light touch and perfect taste are very much present along with a steady stream of purposeful single-note lines that are full of surprising twists... this recommended set (a definitive Wynton Kelly release) showcases magical trio performances". The All About Jazz Review by David Rickert said "Kelly was never in better form than on this album. A great piano trio date".

Professional ratings
Review scores
Source	Rating
Allmusic	4.5/5 stars
The Penguin Guide to Jazz	3/4 stars

== Track listing ==
All compositions by Wynton Kelly except as indicated

1. "Someday My Prince Will Come" (Frank Churchill, Larry Morey) - 3:02
2. "Gone with the Wind" (Herbert Magidson, Allie Wrubel) - 4:15
3. "Autumn Leaves" [Take 2] (Joseph Kosma, Johnny Mercer, Jacques Prévert) - 4:28
4. "Come Rain or Come Shine" (Harold Arlen, Johnny Mercer) - 5:54
5. "Weird Lullabye" (Babs Gonzales) - 7:13
6. "Sassy" - 5:10
7. "Wrinkles" - 7:56
8. "On Stage" - 5:12
9. "Char's Blues" [Take 1] - 4:59
10. "Love, I've Found You" (Danny Small) - 2:37
11. "The Surrey With the Fringe on Top" [Take 3] (Oscar Hammerstein II, Richard Rodgers) - 3:43 Bonus track on CD reissue
12. "Joe's Avenue" aka "Scotch and Water" [Take 4] - 6:36 Bonus track on CD reissue
13. "Someday My Prince Will Come" [Take 5] (Churchill, Morey) - 3:02 Bonus track on CD reissue
14. "Autumn Leaves" [Take 1] (Joseph Kosma, Johnny Mercer, Jacques Prévert) - 8:23 Bonus track on CD reissue
15. "Char's Blues" [Take 2] - 5:36 Bonus track on CD reissue

- Recorded at Fine Sound Studios, NYC, August 12, 1959 (track 7), Bell Sound Studio A in New York City on April 27, 1960 (tracks 5 & 8), and July 20 (tracks 1, 13 & 14) & 21 (tracks 2–4, 6, 9–12 & 15), 1961

== Personnel ==
- Wynton Kelly - piano
- Lee Morgan - trumpet (track 7)
- Wayne Shorter - tenor saxophone (track 7)
- Paul Chambers (tracks 1–3, 5 & 7–15), Sam Jones (tracks 4 & 6) - bass
- Jimmy Cobb - drums
