= Cannonball Takes Charge =

Studio album by Cannonball Adderley
- Released: August 1959
- Recorded: April 23, 27 & May 12, 1959
- Studio: Reeves Sound (New York City)
- Genres: Jazz, hard bop
- Label: Riverside
- Producer: Orrin Keepnews

Cannonball Adderley chronology
Cannonball Adderley Quintet in Chicago (1959)	Cannonball Takes Charge (1959)	The Cannonball Adderley Quintet in San Francisco (1959)

Cannonball Takes Charge is an album by jazz saxophonist Cannonball Adderley released on the Riverside label featuring performances by Adderley leading a studio quartet featuring pianist Wynton Kelly. On four of the album's originally released tracks, bassist Paul Chambers and drummer Jimmy Cobb complete the quartet. On the other three originally released tracks, bassist Percy Heath and his brother, drummer Albert "Tootie" Heath, complete the group. On CD reissues, alternate takes of two of the compositions played with Percy and Tootie Heath have been added to the program.

== Reception ==
Professional ratings
Review scores
Source	Rating
AllMusic	4/5 stars
The Penguin Guide to Jazz	2.5/4 stars

The Penguin Guide to Jazz said that "Cannonball Takes Charge is perhaps only ordinary." The AllMusic review by Ken Dryden awarded the album 4 stars and states: "Cannonball Adderley is in top form on this 1959 release."

== Track listing ==
All compositions by Julian "Cannonball" Adderley except as indicated

1. "If This Isn't Love" (Burton Lane, E.Y. "Yip" Harburg) – 5:32
2. "I Guess I'll Hang My Tears Out to Dry" (Jule Styne, Sammy Cahn) – 5:34
3. "Serenata" (Leroy Anderson) – 4:16
4. "I've Told Ev'ry Little Star" (Jerome Kern, Oscar Hammerstein II) – 3:39
5. "Barefoot Sunday Blues" – 7:03
6. "Poor Butterfly" (Raymond Hubbell, John Golden) – 5:10
7. "I Remember You" (Victor Schertzinger, Johnny Mercer) – 6:55
8. "Barefoot Sunday Blues" [alternative take] – 7:48 Bonus track on CD
9. "I Remember You" [alternative take] (Schertzinger, Mercer) – 6:52 Bonus track on CD
- Recorded at Reeves Sound Studio in New York City on April 23 (track 4), April 27 (tracks 1–3) and May 12 (tracks 5–9), 1959

== Personnel ==
- Cannonball Adderley – alto saxophone
- Wynton Kelly – piano
- Paul Chambers – bass (tracks 1–4)
- Jimmy Cobb – drums (tracks 1–4)
- Percy Heath – bass (tracks 5–9)
- Albert "Tootie" Heath – drums (tracks 5–9)
