= Out of the Blue (Blue Mitchell album) =

Studio album by Blue Mitchell
- Released: 1959
- Recorded: January 5, 1959
- Genre: Jazz
- Length: 46:05
- Label: Riverside
- Producer: Orrin Keepnews

Blue Mitchell chronology
Big 6 (1958)	Out of the Blue (1959)	Blue Soul (1959)

Out of the Blue is an album led by American trumpeter Blue Mitchell recorded and released in 1959 on the Riverside label.

== Reception ==
Professional ratings
Review scores
Source	Rating
AllMusic	4/5 stars
The Penguin Guide to Jazz Recordings	3.5/4 stars

The AllMusic review by Scott Yanow awarded the album 4 stars and stated "This early recording by Blue Mitchell finds the distinctive trumpeter in excellent form... It's an enjoyable date of high-quality hard bop."

== Track listing ==
All compositions by Blue Mitchell except as indicated

1. "Blues on My Mind" (Benny Golson) – 9:05
2. "It Could Happen to You" (Johnny Burke, Jimmy Van Heusen) – 5:52
3. "Boomerang" (Clark Terry) – 5:01
4. "Sweet-Cakes" – 6:09
5. "Missing You" (Ronnell Bright) – 5:40
6. "When the Saints Go Marching In" (Traditional) – 7:00
7. "Studio B" (Paul Chambers) – 7:18 Bonus track on CD reissue

- Recorded at Reeves Sound Studios in New York City on January 5, 1959.

== Personnel ==
- Blue Mitchell – trumpet
- Benny Golson – tenor saxophone
- Wynton Kelly (tracks 1–6), Cedar Walton (track 7) – piano
- Paul Chambers (tracks 2 & 5–7), Sam Jones (tracks 1, 3 & 4) – bass
- Art Blakey – drums
