= It's All Right! (Wynton Kelly album) =

Studio album by Wynton Kelly
- Released: 1964
- Recorded: March 10, 11 & 19, 1964
- Genre: Jazz
- Length: 37:06
- Label: Verve
- Producer: Creed Taylor

Wynton Kelly chronology
Comin' in the Back Door (1963)	It's All Right! (1964)	Undiluted (1965)

It's All Right! is an album by jazz pianist Wynton Kelly released through Verve featuring performances by Kelly with Paul Chambers and Jimmy Cobb with Kenny Burrell and Candido Camero recorded in 1964. The recording was produced by Creed Taylor.

== Reception ==
The Allmusic review by Scott Yanow awarded the album 3 stars, stating: "The music is essentially easy listening jazz with concise versions of ten numbers... overall, this effort is not too essential.

Professional ratings
Review scores
Source	Rating
Allmusic	3/5 stars
The Penguin Guide to Jazz	3/4 stars

== Track listing ==
1. "It's All Right" (Curtis Mayfield) - 2:51
2. "South Seas" (Rudy Stevenson) - 5:30
3. "Not a Tear" (Stevenson) - 5:59
4. "Portrait of Jennie" (Gordon Burdge, J. Russel Robinson) - 4:37
5. "Kelly Roll" (Kenny Burrell) - 3:52
6. "The Fall of Love" [From The Fall of the Roman Empire] (Dimitri Tiomkin, Ned Washington) - 2:06
7. "Moving Up" (Wynton Kelly) - 3:53
8. "On the Trail" [From the Grand Canyon Suite] (Ferde Grofé) - 4:31
9. "Escapade" (Andy Badalele, Morton Wax) - 2:57
10. "One for Joan" (Charles Lloyd) - 3:11 Bonus track on CD

- Recorded at the Webster Hall in New York City on March 10 (tracks 2, 3 & 6), March 11 (track 1) and March 19 (tracks 4, 5 & 7–10)

== Personnel ==
- Wynton Kelly - piano
- Kenny Burrell - guitar (tracks 1–3 & 5–10)
- Paul Chambers - bass
- Jimmy Cobb - drums
- Candido Camero - conga (tracks 1–5 & 7–10)
- The Tommy Rey Caribe Steel Band: Tommy Reynolds, Ralph Cowley, Hiram Delgado, Malcolm Evans, Norman Symonds - steel percussion and Donald Usher - maracas (track 6)
