= Kelly Blue =

Studio album by Wynton Kelly
- Released: 1959
- Recorded: February 19 and March 10, 1959
- Genre: Jazz
- Length: 43:21
- Label: Riverside
- Producer: Orrin Keepnews

Wynton Kelly chronology
Piano (1958)	Kelly Blue (1959)	Kelly Great (1959)

Kelly Blue is an album by American jazz pianist Wynton Kelly, released in 1959.

== History ==
Coming off of his success as a sideman with Miles Davis's sextet, Riverside Records gave Kelly an opportunity to expand on his solo career. Kelly Blue was his second LP for the label.

The songs feature Kelly and bassist Paul Chambers and drummer Jimmy Cobb. Together they had formed the rhythm section for the Miles Davis bands. Guests include Nat Adderley, Bobby Jaspar and Benny Golson.

Producer and jazz critic Orrin Keepnews described the album as "a repertoire ideally suited to the blues concept on which the album is based".

Originally released by Riverside, the album has been reissued on CD several times since 1989 by Riverside and OJC. One is a hybrid Super Audio CD playable on both regular and Super Audio CD players. The one from 1989 is a straight mono remaster. 2009 saw a mono vinyl re-issue.

== Reception ==
Professional ratings
Review scores
Source	Rating
AllMusic	4.5/5 stars
The Penguin Guide to Jazz	4/4 stars
The Pittsburgh Courier	5/5 stars
The Rolling Stone Jazz Record Guide	4/5 stars
Encyclopedia of Popular Music	5/5 stars

In his AllMusic review, music critic Scott Yanow wrote "Kelly was renowned as an accompanist, but as he shows on a set including three of his originals and four familiar standards (including "Softly, As in a Morning Sunrise" and "Willow Weep for Me"), he was also a strong bop-based soloist too. A fine example of his talents."

== Track listing ==
1. "Kelly Blue" (Wynton Kelly) – 10:41
2. "Softly, as in a Morning Sunrise" (Oscar Hammerstein, Sigmund Romberg) – 6:24
3. "(On) Green Dolphin Street" (Bronislau Kaper, Ned Washington) – 4:39
4. "Willow Weep for Me" (Ann Ronell) – 6:05
5. "Keep It Moving" (Kelly) – 7:31
6. "Old Clothes" (Kelly) – 7:37

=== Bonus tracks ===
Remastered versions of the album include a bonus track: "Do Nothing till You Hear from Me", as well as an alternate take of "Keep It Moving".

== Personnel ==
=== Musicians ===
- Wynton Kelly – piano
- Nat Adderley – cornet - tracks 1 and 5
- Bobby Jaspar – flute - tracks 1 and 5
- Benny Golson – tenor saxophone - tracks 1 and 5
- Paul Chambers – bass
- Jimmy Cobb – drums

=== Production ===
- Orrin Keepnews – production, liner notes
- Jack Higgins – recording engineering
- Harris Lewine, Paul Bacon, Ken Braren – design
- Kirk Felton – digital remastering
