= Gil Evans & Ten =

Studio album by Gil Evans
- Released: End of February/Early March 1958
- Recorded: September 9 & 27, October 10, 1957
- Studio: Van Gelder Studio, Hackensack, New Jersey
- Genre: Jazz
- Length: 33:17
- Label: Prestige; PRLP 7120
- Producer: Bob Weinstock

Gil Evans chronology
Gil Evans & Ten (1958)	New Bottle Old Wine (1958)

Gil Evans & Ten (also released as Big Stuff and Gil Evans + Ten) is the first album by pianist, conductor, arranger and composer Gil Evans as a leader, released on the Prestige label in 1957. It features Evans' arrangements of five standards and one original composition performed by Evans, Steve Lacy, John Carisi, Jack Koven, Jimmy Cleveland, Bart Varsalona, Willie Ruff, Lee Konitz, Dave Kurtzer, Paul Chambers, Jo Jones, Louis Mucci and Nick Stabulas. In 2003, a SACD version was published, with the first release of the stereo version.

== Critical reception ==
The AllMusic review by Scott Yanow stated, "As good an introduction to his work as any, this program includes diverse works ranging from Leadbelly to Leonard Bernstein, plus Evans' own 'Jambangle.' The arranger's inventive use of the voices of his rather unusual sidemen makes this a memorable set.". Writing for The Penguin Guide to Jazz, a critic observed, "It's a record somewhat overshadowed by the Impulse! and Verve sessions... but there's still plenty to listen to and enjoy".

Professional ratings
Review scores
Source	Rating
Allmusic	5/5 stars
The Penguin Guide to Jazz	3/4 stars
The Rolling Stone Jazz Record Guide	3/5 stars

== Track listing ==
1. "Remember" (Berlin) – 4:33
2. "Ella Speed" (Lead Belly, Lomax) – 5:50
3. "Big Stuff" (Bernstein) – 4:49
4. "Nobody's Heart" (Rodgers, Hart) – 4:25
5. "Just One of Those Things" (Porter) – 4:25
6. "If You Could See Me Now" (Dameron, Carl Sigman) – 4:18
7. "Jambangle" (Evans) – 4:57

Track 1 recorded on September 6, 1957; # 2, 4 and 6 recorded on September 27, 1957; tracks 3, 5 and 7 on October 10, 1957.

== Personnel ==
- Gil Evans – piano
- Steve Lacy – soprano saxophone
- Jake Koven – trumpet
- Jimmy Cleveland – trombone
- Bart Varsalona – bass trombone
- Willie Ruff – French horn
- Lee Konitz – alto saxophone
- Dave Kurtzer – bassoon
- Paul Chambers – bass
- Jo Jones – drums (1)
- John Carisi – trumpet (1)
- Louis Mucci – trumpet (2–7)
- Nick Stabulas – drums (2–7)
