= Naturally! =

Studio album by Nat Adderley
- Released: 1961
- Recorded: June 20 & July 19, 1961
- Genre: Jazz
- Label: Jazzland

Nat Adderley chronology
That's Right! (1960)	Naturally! (1961)	In the Bag (1962)

Naturally! is an album by jazz cornetist Nat Adderley, released on the Jazzland label and featuring performances by Adderley with two separate groups, the first featuring Joe Zawinul, Sam Jones, and Louis Hayes, and the second with Wynton Kelly, Paul Chambers, and Philly Joe Jones.

== Reception ==
The AllMusic review by Alex Henderson called it a "solid and pleasing (if less than essential) album". The All About Jazz review by Derek Taylor stated, "Complimentary [sic] sides of a coin, these two quartets share the welcome common denominator of Nat Adderley. Fortunately, his role in the driver's seat would be repeated frequently over the ensuing decades. No doubt this earlier outing had something to do with it".

Professional ratings
Review scores
Source	Rating
AllMusic	3.5/5 stars
DownBeat	3/5 stars

== Track listing ==
1. "Naturally" (Nat Adderley, Julian "Cannonball" Adderley) - 5:05
2. "Seventh Son" [aka "Lateef Minor Seventh"] (Joe Zawinul) - 6:51
3. "Love Letters" (Edward Heyman, Victor Young) - 4:16
4. "This Man's Dream" (Charles "Specs" Wright) - 5:29
5. "Chloe" (Gus Kahn, Neil Moret) - 5:48
6. "Images" (Sonny Red) - 4:39
7. "Oleo" (Sonny Rollins) - 3:30
8. "Scotch and Water" (Zawinul) - 4:33

- Recorded on June 20 (tracks 1–4) & July 19 (tracks 5–8), 1961

== Personnel ==
- Nat Adderley – cornet
- Joe Zawinul – piano (tracks 1–4)
- Sam Jones – bass (tracks 1–4)
- Louis Hayes – drums (tracks 1–4)
- Wynton Kelly – piano (tracks 5–8)
- Paul Chambers – bass (tracks 5–8)
- Philly Joe Jones – drums (tracks 5–8)
