= In Style (Sonny Stitt album) =

Studio album by Sonny Stitt
- Released: 1982
- Recorded: March 18, 1981
- Studio: Van Gelder Studio, Englewood Cliffs, NJ
- Genre: Jazz
- Length: 37:20
- Label: Muse; MR 5228
- Producer: Elliot Meadow

Sonny Stitt chronology
| Sonny's Back (1981) | In Style (1982) | he Last Stitt Sessions, Vol. 1 (1983) |

In Style is an album by saxophonist Sonny Stitt recorded in 1981 and released on the Muse label the following year.

== Reception ==
Professional ratings
Review scores
| Source | Rating |
|---|---|
| AllMusic | 4/5 stars |

Scott Yanow, in his review for AllMusic, stated "Sonny Stitt (heard on both alto and tenor) is in excellent form on this LP -- yet another quartet date. He led over 100 sessions through the years. With pianist Barry Harris, bassist George Duvivier, and drummer Jimmy Cobb inspiring him, Stitt is creative within the boundaries of bebop".

== Track listing ==
1. "Western Style" (Sonny Stitt) – 4:46
2. "I'll Walk Alone" (Jule Styne, Sammy Cahn) – 5:39
3. "Just You, Just Me" (Jesse Greer, Raymond Klages) – 4:56
4. "The Good Life" (Sacha Distel, Jack Reardon) – 2:49
5. "Is You Is or Is You Ain't My Baby" (Louis Jordan, Bill Austin) – 5:01
6. "Killing Me Softly with His Song" (Charles Fox, Norman Gimbel) – 4:11
7. "Eastern Style" (Stitt) – 3:39
8. "Yesterdays" (Jerome Kern, Otto Harbach) – 6:19

== Personnel ==
- Sonny Stitt - alto saxophone (tracks 2, 4 & 6), tenor saxophone (tracks 1, 3, 5, 7 & 8)
- Barry Harris - piano
- George Duvivier - bass
- Jimmy Cobb - drums
