= Last Trio Session =

Studio album by Wynton Kelly
- Released: 1988
- Recorded: August 4, 1968
- Genre: Jazz
- Length: 40:23
- Label: Delmark
- Producer: Robert G. Koester

Wynton Kelly chronology
Full View (1966)	Last Trio Session (1988)

Last Trio Session is an album by jazz pianist Wynton Kelly recorded in 1968 and released on the Delmark label in 1988 featuring performances by Kelly with Paul Chambers and Jimmy Cobb. The album was originally released on vinyl in 1979 as Wynton Kelly on Powertree.

== Reception ==
The Allmusic review by Scott Yanow awarded the album 2½ stars stating "the musicians do their best to swing the tunes... However, this historic set is not too essential overall".

Professional ratings
Review scores
Source	Rating
Allmusic	2.5/5 stars
The Penguin Guide to Jazz	3/4 stars

== Track listing ==
All compositions by Wynton Kelly except as indicated

1. "When Love Slips Away" (Jerry Ross, Scott English, Vic Millrose) - 4:12
2. "Castilian Waltz" [Take 12] - 4:23
3. "Say a Little Prayer for Me" (Burt Bacharach, Hal David) - 3:24
4. "Kelly's Blues" (Oscar Peterson) - 7:56
5. "Watch What Happens" (Norman Gimbel, Michel Legrand) - 5:51
6. "House of Cards" - 3:40
7. "Light My Fire" (John Densmore, Robbie Krieger, Ray Manzarek, Jim Morrison) - 4:28
8. "Castilian Waltz" [Take 1] - 4:18
9. "Yesterday" (John Lennon, Paul McCartney) - 2:55

- Recorded in Chicago, IL on August 4, 1968

== Personnel ==
- Wynton Kelly - piano
- Paul Chambers - bass
- Jimmy Cobb - drums
