= Lee Morgan, Vol. 3 =

Studio album by Lee Morgan
- Released: 1957
- Recorded: March 24, 1957
- Studio: Van Gelder Studio; Hackensack, New Jersey
- Genre: Jazz
- Length: 38:01 (LP)
- Label: Blue Note; BLP 1557
- Producer: Alfred Lion

Lee Morgan chronology
Dizzy Atmosphere (1957)	Lee Morgan, Vol. 3 (1957)	City Lights (1957)

Lee Morgan, Vol. 3 is the third album by American jazz trumpeter Lee Morgan, recorded on March 24, 1957 and released on Blue Note later that year. The sextet features saxophonists Gigi Gryce and Benny Golson and rhythm section Wynton Kelly, Paul Chambers and Charlie Persip.

== Reception ==
Professional ratings
Review scores
Source	Rating
AllMusic	4/5 stars

The AllMusic review by Michael G. Nastos called the album "one of the best recordings in Lee Morgan's early career and well worth a hearty recommendation to all."

== Track listing ==
All tracks composed and arranged by Benny Golson.

=== Side 1 ===
1. "Hasaan's Dream" – 8:44
2. "Domingo" – 9:22

=== Side 2 ===
1. "I Remember Clifford" – 7:07
2. "Mesabi Chant" – 6:09
3. "Tip-Toeing" – 6:39

=== CD reissue bonus track ===
6. "Tip-Toeing" (alternate take) – 6:40

== Personnel ==
=== Musicians ===
- Lee Morgan – trumpet
- Gigi Gryce – alto saxophone, flute
- Benny Golson – tenor saxophone
- Wynton Kelly – piano
- Paul Chambers – bass
- Charlie Persip – drums

=== Technical personnel ===
- Alfred Lion – producer
- Rudy Van Gelder – recording engineer
- Harold Feinstein – design
- Francis Wolff – photography
- Ira Gitler – liner notes
