= Wynton Kelly! =

Studio album by Wynton Kelly
- Released: 1961
- Recorded: July 20–21, 1961
- Studio: Bell Sound (New York City)
- Genre: Jazz
- Length: 34:27
- Label: Vee-Jay
- Producer: Orrin Keepnews

Wynton Kelly chronology
Kelly at Midnight (1960)	Wynton Kelly! (1961)	Someday My Prince Will Come (1961)

Wynton Kelly! is an album by jazz pianist Wynton Kelly released on the Vee-Jay label featuring performances by Kelly with Paul Chambers or Sam Jones and Jimmy Cobb recorded in 1961. Additional performances from these sessions were released as Someday My Prince Will Come.

== Reception ==
The Allmusic review by Jim Todd awarded the album 2½ stars and states "a fine example of Kelly relaxed and swinging. Working a similar niche to some of the piano trio work of Red Garland and Ahmad Jamal — two pianists with their own associations with Miles Davis — Kelly takes a selection of well-known standards and energizes them with tasteful, sophisticated, snappy performances, blending in a group of original tunes along the way".

Critic Ira Gitler writing in the January 4, 1962 issue of DownBeat awarded the album four stars. He called it "A throughly enjoyable, professional piano recital. Kelly has all the equipment, and he knows what to do with it."

Professional ratings
Review scores
Source	Rating
Allmusic	2.5/5 stars
DownBeat	4/5 stars
The Penguin Guide to Jazz	3/4 stars

== Track listing ==
All compositions by Wynton Kelly except as indicated

1. "Come Rain or Come Shine" (Harold Arlen, Johnny Mercer) - 5:53
2. "Make the Man Love Me" (Dorothy Fields, Arthur Schwartz) - 3:39
3. "Autumn Leaves" (Joseph Kosma, Johnny Mercer, Jacques Prévert) - 6:11
4. "The Surrey With the Fringe on Top" (Oscar Hammerstein II, Richard Rodgers) - 3:48
5. "Joe's Avenue" aka "Scotch and Water" (Joe Zawinul) - 2:51
6. "Sassy" - 5:11
7. "Love, I've Found You" (Danny Small) - 2:36
8. "Gone with the Wind" (Herbert Magidson, Allie Wrubel) - 4:13

- Recorded at Bell Sound Studio A in New York City on July 20 (tracks 3 & 5) & 21 (tracks 1, 2, 4 & 6-8), 1961

== Personnel ==
- Wynton Kelly - piano
- Paul Chambers (tracks 3–5, 7 & 8), Sam Jones (tracks 1, 2 & 6) - bass
- Jimmy Cobb - drums
