= The Thumper =

Studio album by Jimmy Heath
- Released: 1960
- Recorded: September 1959; New York City
- Genre: Jazz
- Length: 39:50
- Labels: Riverside; RLP 314

Jimmy Heath chronology
The Thumper (1960)	Really Big! (1960)

The Thumper is the debut album by saxophonist Jimmy Heath featuring performances recorded in 1959 originally released on the Riverside label.

== Reception ==
Professional ratings
Review scores
Source	Rating
Allmusic	4/5 stars
DownBeat	4/5 stars
The Penguin Guide to Jazz Recordings	4/4 stars

Scott Yanow of Allmusic says, "The excellent session of late '50s straightahead jazz is uplifted above the normal level by Heath's writing".

== Track listing ==
All compositions by Jimmy Heath except as indicated

1. "For Minors Only" – 4:53
2. "Who Needs It?" (Wynton Kelly) – 5:35
3. "Don't You Know I Care (Or Don't You Care to Know)" (Mack David, Duke Ellington) – 5:02
4. "Two Tees" – 4:14
5. "The Thumper" – 4:01
6. "New Keep" – 4:11
7. "For All We Know" (J. Fred Coots, Sam M. Lewis) – 4:35
8. "I Can Make You Love Me" (Peter DeRose, Bob Russell) – 3:27
9. "Nice People" – 3:52

== Personnel ==
- Jimmy Heath – tenor saxophone
- Nat Adderley – cornet
- Curtis Fuller – trombone
- Wynton Kelly – piano
- Paul Chambers – bass
- Albert Heath – drums
