= Cannonball Adderley Quintet in Chicago =

Studio album by Cannonball Adderley
- Released: August, 1960
- Recorded: February 3, 1959
- Studio: Universal (Chicago)
- Genre: Jazz
- Length: 34:01
- Label: Mercury; MG 20449
- Producer: Jack Tracy

Cannonball Adderley chronology
Blue Spring (1959)	Cannonball Adderley Quintet in Chicago (1960)	Cannonball Takes Charge (1959)

John Coltrane chronology
Giant Steps (1959)	Cannonball Adderley Quintet in Chicago (1959)	Stardust (1959)

Alternative cover
- Cannonball & Coltrane (1964, LM 82009)

Cannonball Adderley Quintet in Chicago (later released as Cannonball & Coltrane in 1964, on Limelight) is an album by jazz saxophonist Cannonball Adderley, his final release on the Mercury label, featuring performances by Adderley with John Coltrane, Wynton Kelly, Paul Chambers and Jimmy Cobb.

With Bill Evans substituting for Wynton Kelly on most tracks, these musicians would record the classic album Kind of Blue (1959), with regular employer Miles Davis, shortly after this session.

== Reception and context ==
The AllMusic review by Scott Yanow awarded the album 4½ stars and states: "Altoist Cannonball Adderley and tenor saxophonist John Coltrane really push each other on these six selections... Coltrane's very serious sound is a striking contrast to the jubilant Adderley alto... With pianist Wynton Kelly, bassist Paul Chambers and drummer Jimmy Cobb playing up to their usual level, this gem is highly recommended". The Penguin Guide to Jazz awarded the album 3 out of 4 stars asserting: "The session with Coltrane is really the Miles Davis band without Miles and it's a bit of good fun, both hornmen flexing their muscles on the blues and a ballad feature apiece".

Professional ratings
Review scores
Source	Rating
AllMusic	4.5/5 stars
The Penguin Guide to Jazz	3/4 stars
The Rolling Stone Jazz Record Guide	4/5 stars

== Track listing ==
1. "Limehouse Blues" (Philip Braham, Douglas Furber) – 4:40
2. "Stars Fell on Alabama" (Mitchell Parish, Frank Perkins) – 6:15
3. "Wabash" (Adderley) – 5:46
4. "Grand Central" (Coltrane) – 4:33
5. "You're a Weaver of Dreams" (Jack Elliott, Victor Young) – 5:34
6. "The Sleeper" (Coltrane) – 7:13

== Personnel ==
- Cannonball Adderley – alto saxophone (except on #5)
- John Coltrane – tenor saxophone (except on #2)
- Wynton Kelly – piano
- Paul Chambers – bass
- Jimmy Cobb – drums
