= Kelly Great =

Studio album by Wynton Kelly
- Released: 1959
- Recorded: August 12, 1959
- Studio: Fine Sound, New York City, NY
- Genre: Jazz
- Length: 35:24
- Label: Vee-Jay; LP-1016/SR-1016
- Producer: Sid McCoy

Wynton Kelly chronology
Kelly Blue (1959)	Kelly Great (1959)	Kelly at Midnight (1960)

Kelly Great is an album by pianist Wynton Kelly released in 1959 by the Vee-Jay label.

== Reception ==
Professional ratings
Review scores
Source	Rating
AllMusic	3/5 stars
The Penguin Guide to Jazz	3/4 stars

In his AllMusic review, music critic Scott Yanow wrote the album "is pretty brief, but what is here on the formerly rare session should satisfy collectors of the style".

== Track listing ==
1. "Wrinkles” (Wynton Kelly) – 8:05
2. "Mama 'G'" (Wayne Shorter) – 7:42
3. "June Night" (Abel Baer, Cliff Friend) – 8:23
4. "What Know" (Lee Morgan) – 8:01
5. "Sydney" (Shorter) – 3:55

== Personnel ==
- Wynton Kelly – piano
- Lee Morgan – trumpet
- Wayne Shorter – tenor saxophone
- Paul Chambers – bass
- Philly Joe Jones – drums
- Sid McCoy – producer
- Cozy Noda – digital remastering
