= Comin' in the Back Door =

Studio album by Wynton Kelly
- Released: 1963
- Recorded: May 10 and November 14 & 15, 1963
- Genre: Jazz
- Length: 34:27
- Label: Verve
- Producer: Creed Taylor

Wynton Kelly chronology
| Someday My Prince Will Come (1961) | Comin' in the Back Door (1963) | It's All Right! (1964) |

Comin' in the Back Door is an album by American jazz pianist Wynton Kelly released on the Verve label featuring performances by Kelly with Paul Chambers and Jimmy Cobb with guitarist Kenny Burrell and an orchestra recorded in 1963.

== Reception ==
The Allmusic review awarded the album 3 stars.

Professional ratings
Review scores
| Source | Rating |
|---|---|
| Allmusic | 3/5 stars |

== Track listing ==
1. "If That's the Way You Want It" (Gloria Shayne) – 2:36
2. "Comin' in the Back Door" (Scott Turner) – 2:20
3. "Don't Wait Too Long" (Sunny Skylar) – 2:10
4. "Nocturne" (Claus Ogerman) – 2:40
5. "The Bitter End" (Ogerman) – 2:00
6. "Theme from "Burke's Law" (Herschel Burke Gilbert) – 2:10
7. "Quiet Village" (Les Baxter) – 3:09
8. "Caesar and Cleopatra Theme" (Alex North) – 3:10
9. "Signing Off" (Leonard Feather) – 2:27
10. "Little Tracy" (Wynton Kelly) – 2:39
11. "To Kill a Mockingbird" (Elmer Bernstein) – 2:15
- Recorded in New York City on May 10, 1963 (tracks 7, 8 & 11), November 14, 1963 (tracks 4, 5 & 10) and November 15, 1963 (tracks 1–3, 6 & 9)

== Personnel ==
- Wynton Kelly – piano
- Kenny Burrell – guitar (tracks 1, 3–6 & 8–11)
- Paul Chambers – bass
- Jimmy Cobb – drums
- Claus Ogerman – string arrangement, conductor (tracks 1–3, 6–9 & 11)
- Unknown musicians – cornet, clarinet, tenor saxophone (tracks 2 & 5)
- Unknown musician – vibes (tracks 8, 9 & 11)
- Unknown musician – percussion (tracks 1, 7 & 8)
- Unknown musicians – trumpet, trombone, saxophones, conga, timpany, bell (track 11)
- Bob Simpson, Phil Ramone – engineer
- Val Valentin – director of engineering
