= Introducing Wayne Shorter =

Studio album by Wayne Shorter
- Released: August 1960
- Recorded: November 9–10, 1959
- Studio: Bell Sound (New York City)
- Genre: Hard bop
- Length: 37:12 original LP
- Label: Vee-Jay; VJLP 3006
- Producer: Sid McCoy

Wayne Shorter chronology
Introducing Wayne Shorter (1960)	Wayning Moments (1962)

Introducing Wayne Shorter is the debut album by jazz saxophonist Wayne Shorter. It was recorded on November 9 and 10, 1959, at Bell Sound Studios in New York City. It features five Shorter compositions, plus Kurt Weill's "Mack the Knife”, performed by a quintet featuring trumpeter Lee Morgan, pianist Wynton Kelly, bassist Paul Chambers and drummer Jimmy Cobb. Shorter played with Morgan in the front line of Art Blakey's Jazz Messengers at this time while Kelly, Chambers and Cobb were the widely celebrated rhythm section with Miles Davis.

The album was released in 1960 by Vee-Jay Records, and was also issued later under the title Blues a la Carte. Tracks from this session were included on the 1972 compilation Shorter Moments as well as the 2000 compilation The Complete Vee Jay Lee Morgan-Wayne Shorter Sessions

On November 10, Shorter also participated in the recording of the Art Blakey and The Jazz Messengers' album Africaine, his first studio session with the Jazz Messengers, which included two of his compositions, one of which was the title track.

== Reception ==
Professional ratings
Review scores
Source	Rating
AllMusic	3/5 stars
The Penguin Guide to Jazz Recordings	3.5/4 stars
The Rolling Stone Jazz Record Guide	3/5 stars

In a review for AllMusic, Scott Yanow called the music "quite enjoyable," and wrote that the album "shows that, even at this early stage, Shorter was far along toward developing his own sound." The authors of The Penguin Guide to Jazz stated that the album gives "the impression of a searching performer who has sufficient lateral vision to keep himself one step ahead of the game."

Writing for All About Jazz, C. Michael Bailey commented: "This is rarified music that is immediately enjoyable. It illuminates the sheer talent and genius of Wayne Shorter, even so early in his playing career. He is definitely a tenor for our time." In a separate article for the same publication, Chris May wrote: "Like practically every other tenor saxophonist of his generation, Shorter was profoundly influenced by Coltrane, seven years his senior; that comes through on Introducing, not least in Shorter's tone, but there are clear glimpses of the singularity to come."

== Track listing ==
All compositions by Wayne Shorter except where noted.

1. "Blues a la Carte" [Take 4] – 5:35
2. "Harry's Last Stand" [Take 5] – 4:40
3. "Down in the Depths" [Take 5] – 9:41
4. "Pug Nose" [Take 3] – 6:49
5. "Black Diamond" [Take 7] – 6:00
6. "Mack the Knife" [Take 5] (Marc Blitzstein, Bertolt Brecht, Kurt Weill) – 4:27

Bonus tracks on CD reissue

7. "Blues a la Carte" [Take 3] – 5:43
8. "Harry's Last Stand" [Take 4] – 4:58
9. "Down in the Depths" [Take 3] – 10:18
10. "Black Diamond" [Take 1] – 7:42

Recorded on November 9 (#1-2) and November 10 (#3-6), 1959.

== Personnel ==
- Wayne Shorter – tenor saxophone
- Lee Morgan – trumpet
- Wynton Kelly – piano
- Paul Chambers – double bass
- Jimmy Cobb – drums
