= Smokin' at the Half Note =

Live album / studio album by The Wynton Kelly Trio and Wes Montgomery
- Released: November 1965
- Recorded: June 1965 and September 22, 1965
- Venue: The Half Note Club (recording in June)
- Genre: Jazz
- Length: 40:58
- Label: Verve
- Producer: Creed Taylor

Wes Montgomery chronology
Bumpin' (1965)	Smokin' at the Half Note (1965)	Smokin' Guitar (1965)

Wynton Kelly chronology
Undiluted (1965)	Smokin' at the Half Note (1965)	Blues on Purpose (1965)

Smokin' at the Half Note is an album by Wes Montgomery and the Wynton Kelly Trio that was released in 1965. It was recorded live in June 1965 at the Half Note Club in New York City and September 22, 1965 at Van Gelder Studios in Englewood Cliffs, New Jersey. The album combines guitarist Montgomery with the Miles Davis rhythm section from 1959–1963 of Wynton Kelly, Paul Chambers, and Jimmy Cobb. The album's versions of "Unit 7" and "Four on Six" have helped to establish these pieces as jazz standards.

== History ==
Montgomery had performed numerous times previously with Kelly, and his trio with Chambers and Cobb had recorded earlier Montgomery albums for the Riverside label such as Full House. In the summer of 1965, the quartet toured the major jazz clubs in the US and also appeared at the Newport Jazz Festival on the afternoon of Sunday, July 4. Drummer Jimmy Cobb had previously toured briefly with Montgomery in an organ trio with Melvin Rhyne in 1963. The performance was part of Alan Grant's "Portrait In Jazz" series, and Grant is heard as the announcer.

Only two of the original LP's five tracks were recorded at the Half Note: "No Blues" and "If You Could See Me Now." At the behest of producer Creed Taylor, the other three were re-recorded three months later at Rudy Van Gelder's studio in New Jersey.

In 1998, Verve reissued the show on disc two of Impressions: The Verve Jazz Sides with a scrambled track order and some crucial cuts. The first five tracks are from the original Verve LP. Tracks six through eleven are from the posthumously released Willow Weep for Me, without that album's string arrangements.

Pat Metheny stated to The New York Times in 2005 that the solo on "If You Could See Me Now" from this album was his favorite of all time. He called Smokin' at the Half Note "the absolute greatest jazz-guitar album ever made. It is also the record that taught me how to play."

== Reception ==
Professional ratings
Review scores
Source	Rating
Allmusic	5/5 stars
Jazz Institute of Chicago	(no rating)
The Penguin Guide to Jazz	3.5/4 stars

Allmusic jazz critic Jim Smith called the album "essential listening for anyone who wants to hear why Montgomery's dynamic live shows were considered the pinnacle of his brilliant and incredibly influential guitar playing." Smith wrote that "Montgomery never played with more drive and confidence, and he's supported every step of the way by a genuinely smokin' Wynton Kelly Trio."

In his review for the Jazz Institute of Chicago, jazz writer Stuart Nicolson extensively reviewed each song. He praised the album in general, writing "it was in jazz where his impact was most powerfully felt. His style and sound became the role-model for subsequent generations of guitar players and can be heard echoed in the playing of George Benson, Emily Remler, Bruce Forman, Joe Diorio, Pat Metheny, Mark Whitfield, Kevin Eubanks, David Becker and a host of others. These recordings go some way to illustrate why Montgomery turned the jazz world on its collective ear, the effects of which are still with us today."

== Track listing ==
=== Original LP (1965) ===
Side-A (live)

1. "No Blues" (Miles Davis) – 13:00
2. "If You Could See Me Now" (Tadd Dameron, Carl Sigman) – 6:45

Side-B (studio)

1. "Unit 7" (Sam Jones) – 7:30
2. "Four on Six" (Montgomery) – 6:45
3. "What's New?" (Bob Haggart, Johnny Burke) – 6:00

=== CD release (1986– ) ===
1. "No Blues" (Miles Davis) – 12:57
2. "If You Could See Me Now" (Tadd Dameron, Carl Sigman) – 8:21
3. "Unit 7" (Sam Jones) – 6:45
4. "Four on Six" (Montgomery) – 6:44
5. "What's New?" (Bob Haggart, Johnny Burke) – 6:11

=== Remastered CD (2005– ) ===
1. "No Blues" (Miles Davis) – 12:57
2. "If You Could See Me Now" (Tadd Dameron, Carl Sigman) – 8:21
3. "Unit 7" (Sam Jones) – 6:44
4. "Four on Six" (Montgomery) – 6:43
5. "What's New?" (Bob Haggart, Johnny Burke) – 6:10
6. "Willow Weep for Me" (Ann Ronell) – 9:08
7. "Portrait of Jennie" (Gordon Burdge, J. Russell Robinson) – 3:27
8. "The Surrey with the Fringe on Top" (Richard Rodgers, Oscar Hammerstein II) – 6:12
9. "Oh, You Crazy Moon" (Jimmy Van Heusen, Johnny Burke) – 5:29
10. "Misty" (Erroll Garner) – 6:55
11. "Impressions" (John Coltrane) – 5:03

== Personnel ==
Musicians

- Wes Montgomery – guitar
- Wynton Kelly – piano
- Paul Chambers – double bass
- Jimmy Cobb – drums

Production

- Rudy Van Gelder – engineer
- Val Valentin – engineering director
