= Wynton Kelly =

American jazz pianist (1931–1971)

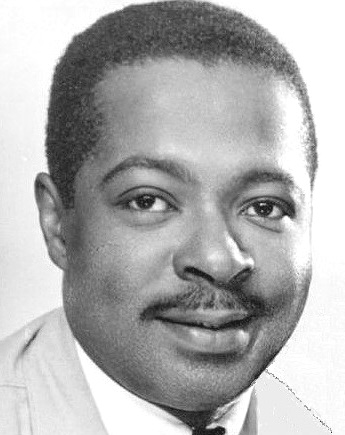
- Kelly c. 1957

Background information
- Born: Wynton Charles Kelly; December 2, 1931; New York City, U.S.
- Died: April 12, 1971 (aged 39) Toronto, Ontario, Canada
- Genres: Jazz; bebop; straight-ahead jazz; hard bop
- Occupations: Musician; composer
- Instrument: Piano
- Years active: 1940s–1971
- Labels: Blue Note; Riverside; Vee-Jay; Verve; Milestone

Wynton Charles Kelly (December 2, 1931 – April 12, 1971) was an American jazz pianist and composer. He is known for his lively, blues-based playing and as one of the finest accompanists in jazz. He began playing professionally at the age of 12 and was pianist on a No. 1 R&B hit at the age of 16. His recording debut as a leader occurred three years later, around the time he started to become better known as an accompanist to singer Dinah Washington, and as a member of trumpeter Dizzy Gillespie's band. This progress was interrupted by two years in the United States Army, after which Kelly worked again with Washington and Gillespie, and played with other leaders. Over the next few years, these included instrumentalists Cannonball Adderley, John Coltrane, Hank Mobley, Wes Montgomery, and Sonny Rollins, and vocalists Betty Carter, Billie Holiday, and Abbey Lincoln.

Kelly attracted the most attention as part of Miles Davis' band from 1959, including an appearance on the trumpeter's Kind of Blue, often mentioned as the best-selling jazz album ever. After leaving Davis in 1963, Kelly played with his own trio, which recorded for several labels and toured the United States and internationally. His career did not develop much further, and he had difficulty finding enough work late in his career. Kelly, who was known to have epilepsy, died in a hotel room in Canada following a seizure, aged 39.

== Early life ==
The son of Jamaican immigrants, Kelly was born in Brooklyn, New York, on December 2, 1931. He began playing the piano at the age of four, but did not receive much formal training in music. He attended the High School of Music & Art and the Metropolitan Vocational High School in New York, but "[t]hey wouldn't give us piano, so I fooled around with the bass and studied theory."

Kelly started his professional career in 1943, initially as a member of R&B groups. Through this, he improved his playing – the bands' "music had to be accessible, entertaining and easy to dance to"; this influenced his later playing. Around this time he also played organ in local churches. In his local area, he played with brothers Lee and Ray Abrams, as well as Ahmed Abdul-Malik, Ernie Henry, and Cecil Payne, who went on to have careers in jazz.

== Main career ==
=== 1946–1958 ===
At the age of 15, Kelly toured the Caribbean as part of Ray Abrams' R&B band. Kelly made his recording debut aged 16, playing on saxophonist Hal Singer's 1948 "Cornbread", which became a Billboard R&B chart-topping hit. In the following year, Kelly recorded with vocalist Babs Gonzales; these tracks included his first recorded solos. Other R&B bands that Kelly played with included those led by Hot Lips Page (1948 or earlier), Eddie "Cleanhead" Vinson (1949), and Eddie "Lockjaw" Davis (1950). Material from sessions on July 25 and August 1, 1951, formed Piano Interpretations, a trio album that was Kelly's recording debut as leader, released by Blue Note Records later that year. Critic Scott Yanow indicates that, at this stage of his career, Kelly's main influence was Bud Powell, but that his playing "displayed some of the joy of Teddy Wilson's style along with his own chord voicings". Kelly became better known after joining vocalist Dinah Washington's band in 1951. After this, he played in bands led by Lester Young in the spring of 1952, and Dizzy Gillespie, recording with the latter later in 1952. In September of that year, just as Kelly was beginning to build a reputation, he was drafted into the army.

After a period at Fort McClellan in Alabama, Kelly was part of a Third Army traveling show. He recruited fellow draftee and future jazz pianist Duke Pearson into the show; together they were able to convince their unit to involve more black musicians, as they were initially the only two out of around two dozen performers. By April 1954, Kelly was "Private First Class Wynton Kelly", musical director of the show. He ended his military service with a music performance for an audience of 10,000 in the Chastain Memorial Park Amphitheater in Atlanta.

Kelly was released from the military after two years, following which he worked on and off with Washington and Gillespie again. Kelly was also part of Charles Mingus' group for a tour of Washington, D.C., California, and Vancouver in late 1956 to early 1957. He left Mingus to rejoin Gillespie, who led a big band that toured Canada and the southern United States. Commenting on Kelly's ability to move from a small group to a big band setting, saxophonist Benny Golson, also from Gillespie's band, said: "He kept his identity; yet he was able to add something to the band, not only melodically (which he was known for) but rhythmically. He would set up patterns – never interfering with the arrangement, but he was able to get into the cracks and he would always be adding something, giving it impetus, more energy." In 1956, Kelly recorded with vocalist Billie Holiday, including for the original version of her song "Lady Sings the Blues", as well as for the Blue Note debuts of saxophonists Johnny Griffin and Sonny Rollins. After leaving Gillespie again, Kelly formed his own trio.

Kelly was much in demand as a sideman for recordings and appeared on albums by most of the major jazz leaders in the late 1950s and early 1960s. In April 1957, for instance, he appeared as a guest in an enlarged version of Art Blakey's Jazz Messengers, for an album later released as Theory of Art; this band included trumpeter Lee Morgan, with whom Kelly had recorded a few weeks earlier. The recording sessions continued four days later, with Kelly joining Blakey, Morgan and others on Griffin's A Blowin' Session; this was followed by three studio days for Gillespie, and another for trumpeter Clark Terry, before the end of the month. Later that year, Kelly made a rare appearance playing bass, for one track of vocalist Abbey Lincoln's That's Him!, after the regular bassist, Paul Chambers, became drunk and fell asleep in the studio.

Early in 1958, Kelly recorded his second album as a leader, the quartet Piano, more than six years after his first. In the same year, he played for recordings led by, among others, vocalist Betty Carter, and made the first of several appearances on albums led by Cannonball Adderley, Blue Mitchell (beginning with Big 6 in 1958), and Hank Mobley. Kelly also played organ on one track of Pepper Adams and Jimmy Knepper's The Pepper-Knepper Quintet, an unusual departure from his usual instrument.

=== 1959–1971 ===
In January 1959, Kelly joined the musician with whom he became most associated – Miles Davis. Adderley, the alto saxophonist in the band, related how Kelly came to replace Red Garland on piano: Davis had admired Kelly's playing as part of Gillespie's band, and Garland was invariably late to arrive for their club performances: "One night, Wynton was there when we started and Miles asked him to sit in. When Red came, Wynton was playing. Miles told Red, 'Wynton's got the gig.' Just like that." Kelly stayed with the trumpeter until March 1963, appearing on the studio albums Kind of Blue and Someday My Prince Will Come, as well as on numerous concert recordings. On Kind of Blue (1959), often mentioned as the best-selling jazz album ever, Kelly played on the track "Freddie Freeloader". Even though Kelly was Davis' regular pianist at the time, the trumpeter had planned the album with Bill Evans in mind, so this is the only piece on which Kelly appears. Kelly toured 22 cities in Europe as part of Davis' quintet in the spring of 1960. Fellow pianist McCoy Tyner commented on Kelly's playing with Davis: "His harmonic colorations were very beautiful. But I think above all it was his ability to swing. John [Coltrane] used to mention that. Miles used to get off the bandstand and just look at Wynton with admiration, because he really held the group together."

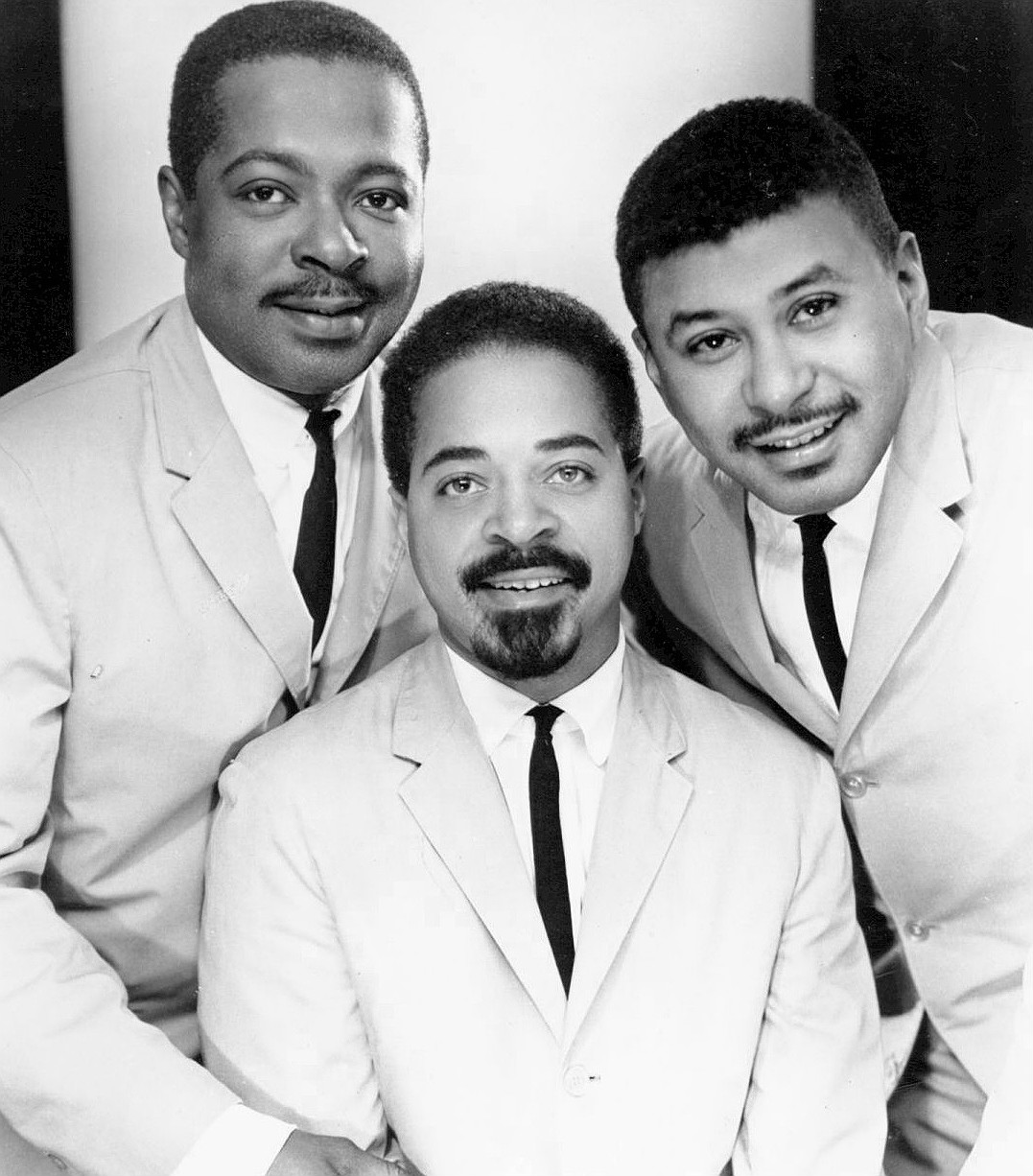
The Wynton Kelly Trio; Kelly (left), Jimmy Cobb (center), Paul Chambers (right)

Davis often left considerable time between band engagements, which allowed the musicians to do other work, so Kelly continued to record with other leaders, including with other members of the Davis band. In February 1959, when in Chicago for performances with Davis, Kelly was pianist on Cannonball Adderley Quintet in Chicago, and bassist Chambers' Go. Later that year, Kelly made his first album for Vee-Jay Records, in a quintet containing Wayne Shorter; Kelly returned the favor a few months later by playing on the saxophonist's debut as leader, Introducing Wayne Shorter. Kelly also recorded with Coltrane, including for one track, "Naima", from the saxophonist's Giant Steps. When Adderley left Davis in late 1959, he attempted to recruit Kelly; although the pianist declined, he did participate in more recording sessions led by his former bandmate, as well as more with Griffin, Mobley, Morgan, and numerous others. Kelly made his first recording with guitarist Wes Montgomery in 1961; they then made Full House the next year; the pairing was described by The Penguin Guide to Jazz as "an association that promised a lot and delivered more".

When he left Davis, Kelly formed his own trio with two others leaving the trumpeter – Chambers and drummer Jimmy Cobb. They soon embarked on a national tour and had recording dates with Verve Records, Kelly having left Vee-Jay after four albums. In May 1964, the calypso track "Little Tracy" from Kelly's Verve album Comin' in the Back Door reached number 38 on Billboard's R&B chart. A few months later, the trio toured Japan for a series of George Wein-organized concerts. In the summer of 1965, they joined Montgomery on a tour of the US that included an appearance at the Newport Jazz Festival, and a club recording released as the Kelly co-led Smokin' at the Half Note. The trio also played with Joe Henderson and others after leaving Davis. According to Cobb, he took charge of the financial side of the trio, as well as its recruiting of additional members, while Kelly primarily was pianist and responsible for dealing with interviewers. The trio stayed together until 1969, when Chambers died.

Towards the end of his career, Kelly had problems finding work, but played with Ray Nance, and as a soloist in New York. Kelly's final recording session appears to have been in the autumn of 1970, accompanying saxophonist Dexter Gordon.

== Death ==
Kelly died in Toronto, Canada, following an epileptic seizure, on April 12, 1971. He had traveled there from New York to play in a club with drummer George Reed and vocalist Herb Marshall. Kelly had a longstanding epilepsy problem and had to monitor his condition carefully. An account of his death was given by his friend, Cobb: "Wynton called his girlfriend in New York and said, 'You know, I don't feel good.' She said, 'Why don't you go downstairs to the bar and if something happens somebody could tend to you.' We don't know if he did that, because when they found him he was in the room." Kelly was found in his room in the Westminster Hotel on Jarvis Street by Marshall. He was reported to have had almost no money at the time of his death. A memorial concert was held on June 28 in New York and featured numerous well-known musicians of the period.

== Personal life and personality ==
Kelly was survived by a daughter, Tracy. Bassist Marcus Miller is a cousin of Kelly's, as are rapper Foxy Brown, and pianist Randy Weston.

Kelly was a heavy drinker; saxophonist Jimmy Heath described him as "an alcoholic" who "could control his drinking" and not let his playing be affected by it. Kelly was known "for being a very warm, generous human being". Bassist Bill Crow reported that Kelly was "full of fun" and said: "He was often the center of backstage laughing sessions as we told stories on each other. Wynton had a removable upper front denture. While on stage, if he saw some of us standing in the wings listening, he would turn around so the audience couldn't see, give us a stern look, and drop his upper plate forward onto his lower lip, creating a grotesquely comical effect. Sometimes he heightened it by sticking his tongue out at us over his upper teeth."

== Playing style ==
Kelly played "with a crisp, leaping rhythmic blues approach that generated intense excitement", wrote The Washington Post's obituarist. The happiness conveyed in his playing was described by Cobb: "It's happy sounding all the time. It's got a West Indian kind of hop to it. Always sparkling". The Rough Guide to Jazz stated that Kelly "combined boppish lines and bluesy interpolations, but with a taut sense of timing quite unlike anyone else except his many imitators", and highlighted the effectiveness of his block chords in contributing to a "dynamic and driving accompanying style". Pianist Brad Mehldau commented that Kelly "dotted his eighth notes quite strongly, and in his own hands the effect was exhilarating".

Kelly was an excellent sight reader, and could memorize parts very quickly, as well as play pieces he had heard but not read before.

Several commentators have rated Kelly the best accompanist in jazz, including critic Ray Comiskey and music educator Mark Levine. Drummer Philly Joe Jones said that, as an accompanist, Kelly "puts down flowers behind a soloist. He never wanted to steal in. He just put together the right things." Pianist Bruce Barth pointed out that part of Kelly's success as an accompanist came from "occasional and compelling use of 'blues licks' and melodic phrases in place of chords." Pianist Sergio Pamies suggested that Kelly represents the bridge between the supportive comping of Red Garland and the conversational comping of Bill Evans.

== Legacy and influence ==
In critic Gary Giddins' view:

Kelly was never able to exploit his gifts when he went out on his own. His quartet with Wes Montgomery should have developed into a major force, but the same commercial interests that shanghaied Montgomery saddled Kelly with the fashionable soul-funk of the mid-'60s. Unlike Montgomery, his career went nowhere, and he didn't live long enough to find himself again.

Writer David Rosenthal commented: "Kelly seemed unable to escape being typecast as a sideman".

Kelly's style of playing has been an influence on numerous pianists, beginning in the 1960s. Among those to cite him directly as an influence are Monty Alexander, Chick Corea, Brad Mehldau, and Chucho Valdés. Pamies suggested that Kelly's comping had a direct influence on Herbie Hancock and McCoy Tyner. Pianists Dan Nimmer and Willie Pickens have recorded tribute albums to Kelly.

The trumpeter Wynton Marsalis (born 1961) was named after Kelly.
