= John Coltrane discography =

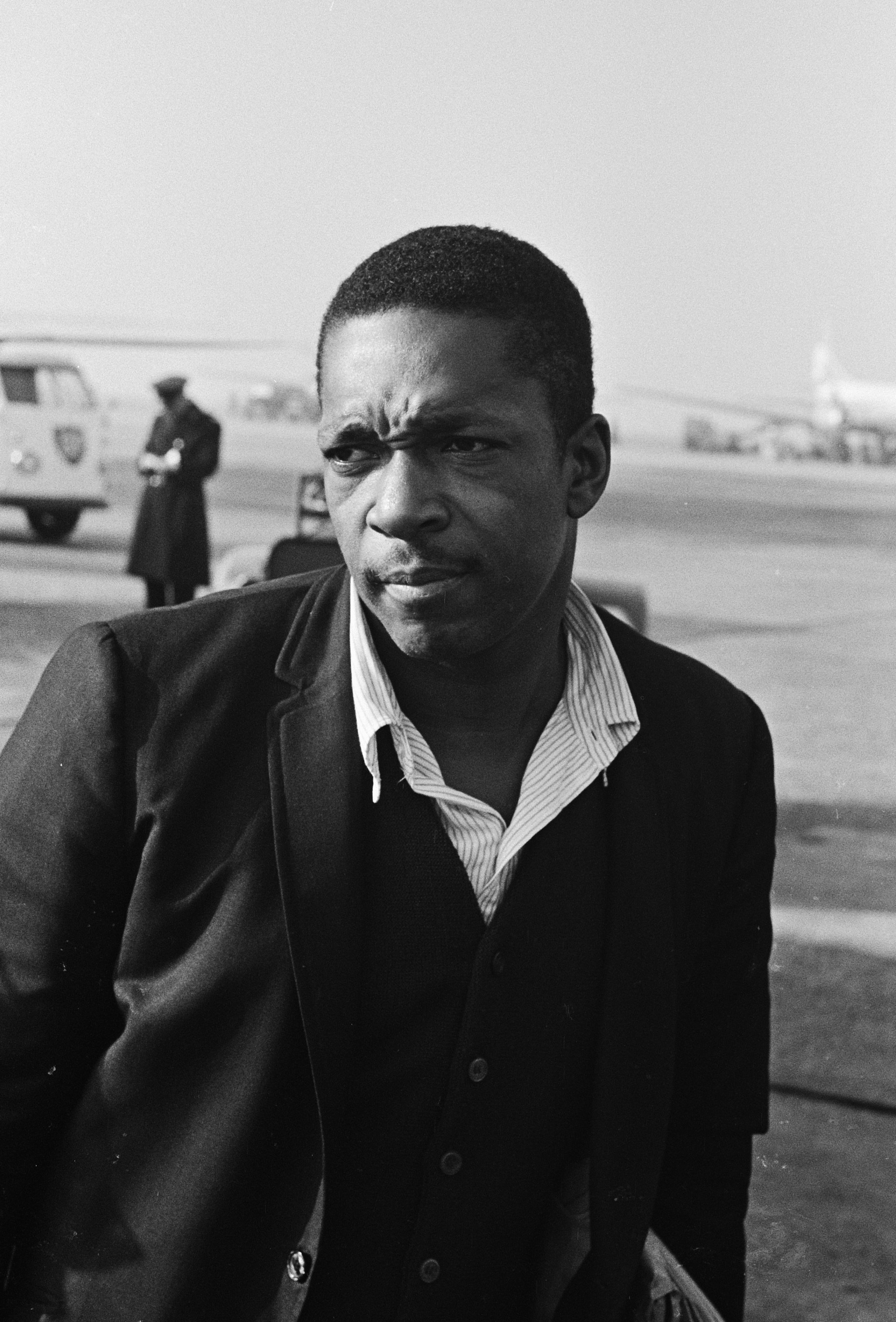
- John Coltrane in 1963
- Studio albums: 45
- Live albums: 11
- Compilation albums: 23
- Singles: 19
- Video albums: 2
- Appearances: 59
- Documentaries: 3
- Television: 2

This article presents the discography of the American jazz saxophonist and bandleader John Coltrane (1926–1967).

== Introduction ==
Coltrane participated in his first recording sessions while enlisted in the Navy from August 6, 1945, to August 11, 1946. He performed eight numbers in a pickup band that included trumpeter Dexter Culbertson. These were private recordings not made for official release. However, one track from the session, "Hot House", eventually appeared on the 1992 compilation The Last Giant: The John Coltrane Anthology.

There are conflicting sources as to whether he made his first professional recording session with Dinah Washington: Jazzdisco.org lists the session as September 27, 1949 in New York City, but Lewis Porter's John Coltrane: His Life and Music states that he was on tour with the Dizzy Gillespie Big Band during that time. Most sources confirm that he recorded with Billy Valentine on November 7 in Los Angeles for Mercury Records. In subsequent years, Coltrane sat in on recording sessions with Gillespie, Johnny Hodges, Earl Bostic, and Gay Crosse.

In September 1955, Coltrane joined the Miles Davis Quintet and appeared on several Miles Davis-led recordings, including 'Round About Midnight and Milestones. He briefly joined Thelonious Monk in May 1957, and their handful of recordings together have been collected on albums such as 1961's Thelonious Monk with John Coltrane. In 1958, he rejoined Davis' band and stayed until April 1960; during that time he participated in the 1959 Kind of Blue sessions.

In April 1957, he signed a contract with Prestige Records; it is unclear if this was a two-year deal or a one-year contract plus a one-year option. Many of Coltrane's recordings for Prestige could be classified as "sideman" recordings and informal jam sessions (or "blowing sessions", in the then-current terminology). He also made his first albums as a group leader, including his 1957 debut, Coltrane. That same year, Prestige allowed him to fulfill a promise that he would make an album for Blue Note, leading to 1958's Blue Train. After Coltrane gained prominence in the early 1960s, Prestige reissued a number of Coltrane's sideman and jam sessions under his name to capitalize on his success. The Prestige Recordings collects all of Coltrane's recordings for Prestige with the exception of his sideman work with Davis.

When his Prestige contract expired, Coltrane signed a two-year contract (one year, plus a one-year option) with Atlantic Records in April 1959. He was the leader of all of these sessions except Bags & Trane and The Avant-Garde, where he was featured with Milt Jackson and Don Cherry respectively. Albums from this period include Giant Steps and My Favorite Things. The Heavyweight Champion box collects his recordings for Atlantic, including all known outtakes.

Coltrane became the first artist to sign with the new Impulse! Records when it bought out his Atlantic contract in April 1961. He would record for the label until the end of his life, and his success earned Impulse! a reputation as "The House That Trane Built". Albums from this final period include the live album Live at Birdland, A Love Supreme, and Ascension.

All of the companies Coltrane worked with during his lifetime have compiled and reissued his material. In addition, Impulse! has issued several previously unreleased live recordings, including Live in Japan and The Olatunji Concert: The Last Live Recording. Coltrane's concert, television and radio performances generated dozens of unauthorized and bootleg recordings. Pablo Records, a label that specializes in live recordings, purchased rights to several tapes of his performances, and is therefore considered a legitimate source despite never signing him to its label.

== Studio albums ==
=== Prestige Records studio albums ===
List of albums released with John Coltrane under contract
Release date	Album	Personnel	Recording date
1957	Coltrane (reissued as The First Trane!)	Johnnie Splawn, Sahib Shihab, Red Garland, Mal Waldron, Paul Chambers, Albert "Tootie" Heath	1957-05-31
1958	John Coltrane with the Red Garland Trio (reissued as Traneing In)	Red Garland, Paul Chambers, Art Taylor	1957-08-23
1958	Soultrane	Red Garland, Paul Chambers, Art Taylor	1958-02-07

List of albums assembled after John Coltrane's contract expired
Release date	Album	Personnel	Recording date
1959	Cattin' with Coltrane and Quinichette (co-leader)	Paul Quinichette (co-leader), Mal Waldron, Julian Euell, Ed Thigpen	1957-05-17
1959	The Cats	Idrees Sulieman, Tommy Flanagan, Kenny Burrell, Doug Watkins, Louis Hayes	1957-04-18
1961-01-00	Lush Life	Earl May, Art Taylor, Red Garland, Paul Chambers, Donald Byrd, Louis Hayes, Albert "Tootie" Heath	1957-05-31, 1957-08-16, 1958-01-10
1961-12-00	Settin' the Pace	Red Garland, Paul Chambers, Art Taylor	1958-03-26
1962	Standard Coltrane	Wilbur Harden, Red Garland, Paul Chambers, Jimmy Cobb	1958-07-11
1963-05-00	Kenny Burrell & John Coltrane (co-leader)	Kenny Burrell (co-leader), Tommy Flanagan, Paul Chambers, Jimmy Cobb	1958-03-07
1963	Stardust	Wilbur Harden, Freddie Hubbard, Red Garland, Paul Chambers, Jimmy Cobb, Art Taylor	1958-07-11, 1958-12-26
1963	Dakar	Cecil Payne, Pepper Adams, Mal Waldron, Doug Watkins, Art Taylor	1957-04-20
1964-04-20	The Believer	Red Garland, Paul Chambers, Donald Byrd, Freddie Hubbard, Louis Hayes, Art Taylor, Gil Coggins, Ray Draper, Spanky DeBrest, Larry Ritchie	1957-12-20, 1958-01-10, 1958-12-26
1964-08-00	Black Pearls	Donald Byrd, Red Garland, Paul Chambers, Art Taylor	1958-05-23
1965-05-00	Bahia	Wilbur Harden, Freddie Hubbard, Red Garland, Paul Chambers, Art Taylor, Jimmy Cobb	1958-07-11, 1958-12-26
1966	The Last Trane	Donald Byrd, Red Garland, Paul Chambers, Earl May, Louis Hayes, Art Taylor	1957-08-16, 1958-01-10, 1958-03-26

=== Blue Note Records studio album ===
Release date	Album	Personnel	Recording date
1958-01	Blue Train	Lee Morgan, Curtis Fuller, Kenny Drew, Paul Chambers, Philly Joe Jones	1957-09-15

=== Savoy Records studio albums ===
Release date	Album	Personnel	Recording date
1958	Tanganyika Strut (co-leader)	Wilbur Harden (co-leader), Curtis Fuller, Tommy Flanagan, Howard Williams, Alvin Jackson, Art Taylor	1958-05-13, 1958-06-24
1958	Jazz Way Out (co-leader)	Wilbur Harden (co-leader), Curtis Fuller, Tommy Flanagan, Alvin Jackson, Art Taylor	1958-06-24
1976	Countdown (Originally released as Wilbur Harden's album Mainstream 1958 in 1958)	Wilbur Harden (co-leader), Tommy Flanagan, Doug Watkins, Louis Hayes	1958-03-13

=== Atlantic Records studio albums ===
List of albums released with John Coltrane under contract
Release date	Album	Personnel	Recording date
1960-02-00	Giant Steps	Tommy Flanagan, Wynton Kelly, Paul Chambers, Art Taylor, Jimmy Cobb, Cedar Walton, Lex Humphries	1959-05-04, 1959-05-05, 1959-12-02
1961-02-00	Coltrane Jazz	Wynton Kelly, Paul Chambers, Jimmy Cobb, McCoy Tyner, Steve Davis, Elvin Jones	1959-03-26, 1959-11-24, 1959-12-02, 1960-10-21
1961-03-00	My Favorite Things	McCoy Tyner, Steve Davis, Elvin Jones	1960-10-21, 1960-10-24, 1960-10-26
1961-11-00	Olé Coltrane	Eric Dolphy, Freddie Hubbard, McCoy Tyner, Reggie Workman, Art Davis, Elvin Jones	1961-05-25

List of albums released after John Coltrane's contract expired
Release date	Album	Personnel	Recording date
1962-07-00	Coltrane Plays the Blues	McCoy Tyner, Steve Davis, Elvin Jones	1960-10-24
1964-06-00	Coltrane's Sound	McCoy Tyner, Steve Davis, Elvin Jones	1960-10-24, 1960-10-26
1966	The Avant-Garde (co-leader)	Don Cherry (co-leader), Charlie Haden, Percy Heath, Ed Blackwell	1960-06-28, 1960-07-08

=== Impulse! Records studio albums ===
List of albums assembled by John Coltrane
Release date	Album	Personnel	Recording date
1961-09-01	Africa/Brass	Pat Patrick, Freddie Hubbard, Booker Little, Britt Woodman, Julian Priester, Charles Greenlee, Carl Bowman, Bill Barber, Garvin Bushell, Julius Watkins, Jim Buffington, Bob Northern, Donald Corrado, Robert Swisshelm, Eric Dolphy, McCoy Tyner, Reggie Workman, Art Davis, Elvin Jones	1961-05-23, 1961-06-07
1962-08-00	Coltrane	McCoy Tyner, Jimmy Garrison, Elvin Jones	1962-04-11, 1962-06-19, 1962-06-20, 1962-06-29
1963-02-00	Duke Ellington & John Coltrane (co-leader)	Duke Ellington (co-leader), Jimmy Garrison, Elvin Jones, Aaron Bell, Sam Woodyard	1962-09-26
1963-03-00	Ballads	McCoy Tyner, Jimmy Garrison, Reggie Workman (1961-12-21), Elvin Jones	1961-12-21, 1962-09-18, 1962-11-13
1963-07-00	Impressions	McCoy Tyner, Jimmy Garrison, Elvin Jones, Roy Haynes (1963-04-29), Eric Dolphy, Reggie Workman (1961-11-05)	1961-11-05, 1962-09-18, 1963-04-29
1963-07-00	John Coltrane and Johnny Hartman (co-leader)	Johnny Hartman (co-leader), McCoy Tyner, Jimmy Garrison, Elvin Jones	1963-03-07
1964-01-09	Live at Birdland	McCoy Tyner, Jimmy Garrison, Elvin Jones	1963-10-08, 1963-11-18
1964-07-00	Crescent	McCoy Tyner, Jimmy Garrison, Elvin Jones	1964-04-27, 1964-06-01
1965-01-00	A Love Supreme	McCoy Tyner, Jimmy Garrison, Elvin Jones	1964-12-09
1965-08-00	The John Coltrane Quartet Plays	McCoy Tyner, Jimmy Garrison (1965-05-17), Art Davis (1965-02-18), Elvin Jones	1965-02-18, 1965-05-17
1966-02-00	Ascension	McCoy Tyner, Jimmy Garrison, Elvin Jones, Marion Brown, Art Davis, Freddie Hubbard, Dewey Johnson, Pharoah Sanders, Archie Shepp, John Tchicai	1965-06-28
1966-09-00	Meditations	McCoy Tyner, Jimmy Garrison, Elvin Jones, Pharoah Sanders, Rashied Ali	1965-11-23
1967-01-00	Kulu Sé Mama	McCoy Tyner, Jimmy Garrison, Elvin Jones, Pharoah Sanders, Donald Rafael Garrett, Frank Butler, Juno Lewis	1965-06-10, 1965-06-16, 1965-10-14
1967-09-00	Expression	Alice Coltrane, Pharoah Sanders, Jimmy Garrison, Rashied Ali	1967-02-15, 1967-03-07

List of posthumous John Coltrane albums
Recording date	Album	Personnel	Release date
1963-03-06	Both Directions at Once: The Lost Album	McCoy Tyner, Jimmy Garrison, Elvin Jones	2018-06-29
1964-06-24	Blue World	McCoy Tyner, Jimmy Garrison, Elvin Jones	2019-09-27
1965-05-26, 1965-06-10	Transition	McCoy Tyner, Jimmy Garrison, Elvin Jones	1970-07-00
1965-06-10, 1965-06-16	Living Space	McCoy Tyner, Jimmy Garrison, Elvin Jones	1998-03-10
1965-08-26	Sun Ship	McCoy Tyner, Jimmy Garrison, Elvin Jones	1971
1965-09-02	First Meditations (for quartet)	McCoy Tyner, Jimmy Garrison, Elvin Jones	1977
1965-10-01	Om	McCoy Tyner, Jimmy Garrison, Elvin Jones, Donald Garrett, Pharoah Sanders, Joe Brazil	1968-01-00
1963-07-07, 1965-10-14	Selflessness: Featuring My Favorite Things	McCoy Tyner, Jimmy Garrison, Elvin Jones, Pharoah Sanders, Donald Garrett, Roy Haynes, Frank Butler, Juno Lewis	1969
1967-02-15	Stellar Regions	Alice Coltrane, Jimmy Garrison, Rashied Ali	1995-10-10
1967-02-22	Interstellar Space	Rashied Ali	1974
1966-02-02, 1968-01-29	Cosmic Music (with Alice Coltrane)	Pharoah Sanders, Alice Coltrane, Jimmy Garrison, Rashied Ali, Ray Appleton, Ben Riley	1968
1965-06-16, 1965-09-22, 1966-02-02, overdubs recorded in 1972	Infinity	Pharoah Sanders, McCoy Tyner, Alice Coltrane, Jimmy Garrison, Rashied Ali, Ray Appleton, Charlie Haden, Joan Chapman, Elvin Jones, Oran Coltrane	1972

== Live albums ==
=== Impulse! Records live albums ===
List of live albums with John Coltrane as main artist, showing recording date, personnel, label and release date
Release date	Album	Personnel	Recording date
1962-03-00	Live! at the Village Vanguard	Eric Dolphy, McCoy Tyner, Reggie Workman, Jimmy Garrison, Elvin Jones	1961-11-02, 1961-11-03
1965	New Thing at Newport (split LP with Archie Shepp)	McCoy Tyner, Jimmy Garrison, Elvin Jones (John Coltrane's set)	1965-07-02
1966-12-00	Live at the Village Vanguard Again!	Pharoah Sanders, Alice Coltrane, Jimmy Garrison, Rashied Ali, Emanuel Rahim	1966-05-28
1971	Live in Seattle	McCoy Tyner, Jimmy Garrison, Elvin Jones, Donald Garrett, Pharoah Sanders	1965-09-30
1973	Concert in Japan	Alice Coltrane, Pharoah Sanders, Jimmy Garrison, Rashied Ali	1966-07-22
1991	Live in Japan	Alice Coltrane, Pharoah Sanders, Jimmy Garrison, Rashied Ali	1966-07-11, 1966-07-22
1993	Newport '63	Eric Dolphy, McCoy Tyner, Reggie Workman, Jimmy Garrison, Roy Haynes	1961-11-02, 1963-07-07
1997-09-23	The Complete 1961 Village Vanguard Recordings	Eric Dolphy, McCoy Tyner, Reggie Workman, Jimmy Garrison, Elvin Jones, Roy Haynes, Garvin Bushell, Ahmed Abdul-Malik	1961-11-01-03, 1961-11-05
2001-09-25	The Olatunji Concert: The Last Live Recording	Alice Coltrane, Pharoah Sanders, Jimmy Garrison, Rashied Ali, Algie DeWitt	1967-04-23
2005	Live at the Half Note: One Down, One Up	McCoy Tyner, Jimmy Garrison, Elvin Jones	1965-03-26, 1965-05-07
2007-07-03	My Favorite Things: Coltrane at Newport	McCoy Tyner, Reggie Workman, Jimmy Garrison, Roy Haynes (1963), Elvin Jones (1965)	1963-07-07, 1965-07-02
2014-09-23	Offering: Live at Temple University	Alice Coltrane, Pharoah Sanders, Sonny Johnson, Rashied Ali	1966-11-11
2021-10-22	A Love Supreme: Live in Seattle	McCoy Tyner, Jimmy Garrison, Elvin Jones, Donald Garrett, Pharoah Sanders, Carlos Ward	1965-10-02
2023-07-14	Evenings at the Village Gate: John Coltrane with Eric Dolphy	Eric Dolphy, Elvin Jones, McCoy Tyner, and Reggie Workman	1961-08

=== Pablo Records live albums ===
List of live albums released by Pablo Records, showing recording date, personnel and release date
Release date	Album	Personnel	Notes	Recording date
1977	Afro Blue Impressions	McCoy Tyner, Jimmy Garrison, Elvin Jones	Stockholm (first date); Berlin, Germany (second date)	1963-10-22, 1963-11-02
1979	The Paris Concert	McCoy Tyner, Jimmy Garrison, Elvin Jones		1962-11-17, 1963-11-0?
1980	The European Tour	McCoy Tyner, Jimmy Garrison, Elvin Jones	Stockholm, Sweden	1963-10-22
1981	Bye Bye Blackbird	McCoy Tyner, Jimmy Garrison, Elvin Jones	Stockholm, Sweden	1962-11-19
2001	Live Trane: The European Tours	Eric Dolphy, McCoy Tyner, Reggie Workman, Jimmy Garrison, Elvin Jones	7-CD set of the above recordings, plus previously unissued tracks.	1961-11-18 – 1963-11-04

=== Live albums released by miscellaneous labels ===
List of live albums released on miscellaneous labels, showing recording date, personnel and release date
Release date	Recording date	Album / label	Personnel
1965	1964-2-23, 1965-4-2	Creation / Blue Parrot	McCoy Tyner, Jimmy Garrison, Elvin Jones
1974	1965-07-27, 1965-07-28	Live in Paris / Charly	McCoy Tyner, Jimmy Garrison, Elvin Jones
1978	1965-05-07	Brazilia / Blue Parrot	McCoy Tyner, Jimmy Garrison, Elvin Jones
1988	1965-07-27, 1965-07-28	Live in Antibes / France's Concert	McCoy Tyner, Jimmy Garrison, Elvin Jones
2009	1961-11-20	The Complete Copenhagen Concert / Gambit	Eric Dolphy, McCoy Tyner, Reggie Workman, Elvin Jones
2009	1966-07-02	Last Performance At Newport / FreeFactory	Jimmy Garrison, Rashied Ali, Alice Coltrane, Pharoah Sanders
2015	1961-11-18–1961-11-23	So Many Things: The European Tour 1961 / Acrobat	Eric Dolphy, McCoy Tyner, Reggie Workman, Elvin Jones
2024	1965-07-26	A Love Supreme (6th International Jazz Festival Juan-Les-Pins, Antibes, France) / Charly	McCoy Tyner, Jimmy Garrison, Elvin Jones

== Appearances ==
=== With Miles Davis ===
List of albums recorded during Coltrane's tenure with Miles Davis, showing recording date, label and release date
Release date	Album	Label	Recording date
1956	What is Jazz? (Leonard Bernstein instructional album) [1 track only : Sweet Sue, Just You]	Columbia	1956-09-10
1956-04	Miles: The New Miles Davis Quintet	Prestige	1955-11-16
1957-03-04	'Round About Midnight	Columbia	1955-10-26, 1956-06-05, 1956-09-10
1957-07	Cookin' with The Miles Davis Quintet	Prestige	1956-10-26
1958-03	Relaxin' with The Miles Davis Quintet	Prestige	1956-05-11, 1956-10-26
1958-09-02	Milestones	Columbia	1958-02-04, 1958-03-04
1959	Legrand Jazz (Michel Legrand album) [4 tracks only]	Columbia	1958-06-25
1959	Miles Davis and the Modern Jazz Giants [1 track only : 'Round Midnight]	Prestige	1956-10-26
1959	Kind of Blue	Columbia	1959-03-02, 1959-04-22
1959	Jazz Track [May 26, 1958 session only]	Columbia	1958-05-26
1960-01	Workin' with The Miles Davis Quintet	Prestige	1956-05-11, 1956-10-26
1961-05	Steamin' with The Miles Davis Quintet	Prestige	1956-05-11, 1956-10-26
1961-12-11	Someday My Prince Will Come [2 tracks only : Someday my Prince Will Come, Teo]	Columbia	1961-03-20, 1961-03-21
1964	Miles and Monk at Newport	Columbia	1958-07-03
1973	Jazz at the Plaza Vol. I	Columbia	1958-09-09
1973	Basic Miles [2 unreleased tracks only : Little Melonae, Budo]	Columbia	1955-10-27
1974	1958 Miles [May 26, 1958 session from Jazz Track with unreleased track Love for Sale, plus concert from Jazz at The Plaza Vol. 1]	Columbia	1958-05-26, 1958-09-09
1979	Circle in the Round [1 unreleased track only : Two bass hit]	Columbia	1955-10-26
2005	'Round About Midnight CD reissue [8 unreleased tracks only from concert at the 1956 Pacific Jazz Festival in Pasadena]	Columbia	1956-02-18
2013	The Unissued Café Bohemia Broadcasts	Domino Records	1956-09-15, 1956-09-29, 1957-04-13, 1958-05-17
2014	All of You: The Last Tour 1960 [including Live in Stockholm, and at the Olympia in Paris]	Acrobat	1960-03-22 – 1960-04-09

=== With Thelonious Monk ===
List of albums recorded during Coltrane's tenure with Thelonious Monk, showing recording date, label and release date
Year released	Album	Label	Recording date
1957	Monk's Music	Riverside	1957-06-26
1959	Thelonious Monk with John Coltrane	Jazzland	1957-04-16, 1957-06-25, 1957-06-26, 1957-07
1959	Thelonious Himself ("Monk's Mood" only)	Riverside	1957-04-16
1993	Live at the Five Spot Discovery!	Blue Note	Late summer 1957
2005	Thelonious Monk Quartet with John Coltrane at Carnegie Hall	Blue Note	1957-11-29
2006	Complete Live at the Five Spot 1958	Gambit	1958-09-11

=== Other appearances ===
List of albums and 78 rpm singles with John Coltrane as session musician, showing recording date, session leader, label and release date
Release date	Album	Leader	Label	Recording date
1949 (session date)	"How Long, How Long / Beer Drinking Baby" (78 rpm disc)	Billy Valentine	Mercury	1949-11-07
1949 (session date)	"Ain't Gonna Cry No More / I Want You to Love Me" (78 rpm disc)	Billy Valentine	Mercury	1949-11-07
1949 (session date)	"Say When / You Stole My Wife, You Horse Thief" (78 rpm disc)	Dizzy Gillespie	Capitol	1949-11-21
1949 (session date)	"Tally Ho / I Can't Remember" (78 rpm disc)	Dizzy Gillespie	Capitol	1949-11-21
1950 (session date)	"Carambola / Honeysuckle Rose" (78 rpm disc)	Dizzy Gillespie	Capitol	1950-01-09
1952 (session date)	"Easy Rockin' / G.C. Rock"	Gay Crosse	Republic	1952
1952 (session date)	"No Better for You / Tired of Being Shoved Around"	Gay Crosse	Republic	1952
1952 (session date)	"Fat Sam from Birmingham / Bittersweet"	Gay Crosse	Gotham	1952-01-19
1952	Earl Bostic and His Alto Sax, Vol. 4 (10-inch album)	Earl Bostic	King	1952-08-15
1954	More of Johnny Hodges	Johnny Hodges	Norgran / Verve	1954-08-05
1956	Earl Bostic for You	Earl Bostic	King	1952-04-07, 1952-08-15
1956	Dance Time	Earl Bostic	King	1952-04-07, 1952-08-15
1956	The Blues and Used to Be Duke	Johnny Hodges	Norgran / Verve	1954-07-02, 1954-08-05
1956	Chambers' Music: A Jazz Delegation from the East	Paul Chambers	Jazz West	1956-03-01 or 02
1956	Jazz in Transition (sampler, one track only)	Pepper Adams	Transition	1956-04-20
1956	Informal Jazz (reissued as Two Tenors)	Elmo Hope	Prestige	1956-05-07
1956	Tenor Madness (title track only)	Sonny Rollins	Prestige	1956-05-24
1956-12-00	Whims of Chambers	Paul Chambers	Blue Note	1956-09-21
1957	Tenor Conclave	No session leader	Prestige	1956-09-07
1957	Mating Call	Tadd Dameron	Prestige	1956-11-30
1957	Taylor's Wailers (March 22, 1957 session only)	Art Taylor	Prestige	1957-03-22
1957	Interplay for 2 Trumpets and 2 Tenors	The Prestige All Stars	Prestige	1957-03-22
1957	A Blowin' Session	Johnny Griffin	Blue Note	1957-04-06
1957	Mal/2	Mal Waldron	Prestige	1957-04-19, 1957-05-17
1957	Baritones and French Horns (reissued as Dakar)	Pepper Adams	Prestige	1957-04-20
1957	Blues for Tomorrow (title track only)	Various Artists	Riverside	1957-06-26
1957	Winner's Circle	No session leader	Bethlehem	1957-10-00
1958	Sonny's Crib	Sonny Clark	Blue Note	1957-09-01
1958	Wheelin' & Dealin'	The Prestige All Stars	Prestige	1957-09-20
1958	All Mornin' Long	Red Garland	Prestige	1957-11-15
1958	The Ray Draper Quintet featuring John Coltrane	Ray Draper	New Jazz	1957-12-20
1958	Art Blakey Big Band	Art Blakey	Bethlehem	1957-12-00
1958	Groove Blues	Gene Ammons	Prestige	1958-01-03
1958	The Big Sound	Gene Ammons	Prestige	1958-01-03
1958	Mainstream 1958: The East Coast Jazz Scene	Wilbur Harden	Savoy	1958-03-15
1959	The Cats	No session leader	Prestige	1957-04-18
1959	New York, N.Y. (one track only)	George Russell	Decca	1958-09-12
1959	Stereo Drive or Hard Driving Jazz (reissued as Coltrane Time)	Cecil Taylor	United Artists	1958-10-13
1959	A Tuba Jazz (reissued as Like Sonny)	Ray Draper	Jubilee	1958-11-00
1959	Cannonball Adderley Quintet in Chicago	Cannonball Adderley	Mercury	1959-02-03
1960	Soul Junction	Red Garland	Prestige	1957-11-15
1961-07	Bags & Trane	Milt Jackson	Atlantic	1959-01-15
1962	High Pressure	Red Garland	Prestige	1957-11-15, 1957-12-13
1962	Dig It! (December 13, 1957 session only)	Red Garland	Prestige	1957-12-13
1964	The Dealers	Mal Waldron	Prestige	1957-04-19, 1957-09-20
1964	Four for Trane (as producer only)	Archie Shepp	Impulse!	1964-08-10

List of previously unreleased songs released on compilations during Coltrane's lifetime
Release Year	Song	Album	Label	Recording date
1961	"Exotica"	The Birdland Story	Roulette	1960-09-08
1964	"Big Nick"	The Definitive Jazz Scene Volume 1	Impulse!	1962-04-1
1964	"Dear Old Stockholm"	The Definitive Jazz Scene Volume 2	Impulse!	1963-04-29
1965	"Vilia"	The Definitive Jazz Scene Volume 3	Impulse!	1963-03-06
1965	"Nature Boy" (Live)	The New Wave In Jazz	Impulse!	1965-03-28

== Singles ==
List of singles and EPs, showing label and release date
Release date	Single	Label
Unknown	"Time Was (Part 1) / Time Was (Part 2)"	Prestige
1957	"Blue Train, Part 1 / Blue Train, Part 2"	Blue Note
1958	"Things Ain't What They Used to Be (Part 1) / Things Ain't What They Used to Be (Part 2)"	Prestige
1958	"Traneing In, Part One / Traneing In, Part Two"	Prestige
1958	"Moment's Notice, Part 1 / Moment's Notice, Part 2"	Blue Note
1959	"Good Bait (Part 1) / Good Bait (Part 2)"	Prestige
1959	"Naima / Cousin Mary"	Atlantic
1960	"I Want to Talk About You (Part 1) / I Want to Talk About You (Part 2)"	Prestige
1960	"Lush Life / I Love You"	Prestige
1961	"My Favorite Things (Part 1) / My Favorite Things (Part 2)"	Atlantic
1961	"Greensleeves / Easy to Remember"	Impulse!
1962	Ballads (EP)	Impulse!
1963	John Coltrane and Johnny Hartman (EP)	Impulse!
1963	"Nancy (with the Laughing Face) / Up 'Gainst the Wall"	Impulse!
1963	"Stardust / Love Thy Neighbor"	Prestige
1963	"The Believer / Dakar"	Prestige
1964	"Limehouse Blues / Stars Fell on Alabama" (with Cannonball Adderley)	Limelight
1965	"By the Numbers (Pt. 1) / By the Numbers (Pt. 2)" (with Red Garland)	Prestige
1966	"I Love You / You Leave Me Breathless"	Prestige

== Compilation albums ==
List of compilations and remix albums with John Coltrane as main artist, showing label and release date
Release date	Compilation	Label
1962	The Best of Birdland: Volume 1. (Side A only)	Roulette
1966	John Coltrane Plays for Lovers	Prestige
1970	The Best of John Coltrane: His Greatest Years	Impulse!
1970-02-00	The Best of John Coltrane	Atlantic
1970-04-00	The Coltrane Legacy	Atlantic
1972	The Best of John Coltrane: His Greatest Years, Vol. 2	Impulse!
1972	More Lasting Than Bronze	Prestige
1972	Infinity	Impulse!
1972	Echoes of an Era (Side D only)	Roulette
1973	The Art of John Coltrane: The Atlantic Years	Atlantic
1974	The Best of John Coltrane: His Greatest Years, Vol. 3	Impulse!
1974	The Africa/Brass Sessions, Volume 2	Impulse!
1975	The Gentle Side Of John Coltrane	Impulse!
1975	High Step (with Paul Chambers)	Blue Note
1975	The Stardust Session	Prestige
1975-03-00	Alternate Takes	Atlantic
1977	Dial Africa: The Savoy Sessions	Savoy
1977	Gold Coast	Savoy
1978	Countdown: The Savoy Sessions	Savoy
1978	On a Misty Night	Prestige
1978	The Mastery of John Coltrane, Vol. 1: Feelin' Good	Impulse!
1978	The Mastery of John Coltrane, Vol. 2: To the Beat of a Different Drum	Impulse!
1978	The Mastery of John Coltrane, Vol. 3: Jupiter Variation	Impulse!
1979	The Mastery of John Coltrane, Vol. 4: Trane's Modes	Impulse!
1980	Coltrane/Dolphy	Carrere
1992	The Major Works of John Coltrane	GRP
1992	The Last Giant: The John Coltrane Anthology	Rhino
1993	Dear Old Stockholm	Impulse!
1995	The Heavyweight Champion: The Complete Atlantic Recordings	Atlantic
1998	The Prestige Recordings	Prestige
1998	The Classic Quartet: The Complete Impulse! Recordings	Impulse!
1998-03-10	Living Space	Impulse!
1999-01-26	Trane's Blues	Blue Note
1999-10-26	The Complete Columbia Recordings of Miles Davis with John Coltrane	Columbia
2000-02-15	The Very Best of John Coltrane	Rhino
2000-11-07	Ken Burns Jazz: John Coltrane	Verve
2001-01-23	Coltrane for Lovers	Impulse! / Verve
2001-07-24	The Very Best of John Coltrane	Impulse!
2002-05-07	Timeless	Savoy
2005-10-25	Prestige Profiles, Vol. 9: John Coltrane	Prestige
2006-09-26	Fearless Leader	Prestige
2007-09-18	Interplay	Prestige
2008-06-09	Opus Collection: A Man Called Trane	Rhino
2009-10-06	Side Steps	Prestige
2012-06-12	The Very Best of John Coltrane: The Prestige Era	Prestige
2016-07-08	The Atlantic Years in Mono	Rhino
2017-06-09	Trane: The Atlantic Collection	Rhino
2018-11-16	1963: New Directions	Impulse!

== Documentaries ==
- The World According to John Coltrane (1990)
- The Church of Saint Coltrane (1996)
- Trane Tracks: The Legacy of John Coltrane (2005)
- Chasing Trane: The John Coltrane Documentary (2017)

== Video albums ==
- John Coltrane: A True Innovator (2004)
- Impressions of Coltrane (2007)

== Television ==
- Jazz Casual: John Coltrane (1963)
- Imagine: Saint John Coltrane (2004)

== Sources ==
- Chasin' The Trane, J.C. Thomas. (1975, Doubleday)
- John Coltrane: His Life and Music, Lewis Porter. (1998, University of Michigan Press)
- Coltrane: The Story of a Sound, Ben Ratliff. (2007, Farrar, Straus and Giroux)
- The House That Trane Built: The Story of Impulse Records, Ashley Kahn. (2006, W.W. Norton)
