= The Prestige Recordings =

Box set by John Coltrane
- Released: 1991
- Recorded: 1956–58
- Studio: Rudy Van Gelder Studio
- Genre: Jazz
- Length: 18h20min
- Label: Prestige
- Producer: Orrin Keepnews (reissue)

John Coltrane chronology
The Prestige Recordings (1991)	The Major Works of John Coltrane (1992)

The Prestige Recordings is a box set by jazz musician John Coltrane.

== Reception ==
Professional ratings
Review scores
Source	Rating
Allmusic	4.5/5 stars
The Penguin Guide to Jazz	3.5/4 stars

In review for AllMusic Lindsay Planer wrote: "The 16 CDs in this compendium represent nearly everything that John Coltrane recorded for the Prestige label during a 32-month period between May 7, 1956, and December 26, 1958... Accompanying the music is a 32-page liner notes booklet. Inside are a historical essay from Doug Ramsey, a session-by-session breakdown by Carl Woideck..., and several different cross-references of the contents. Overall, the audio quality is excellent throughout, especially considering that the original tapes were transferred during the infancy of digital audio technology."

The authors of The Penguin Guide to Jazz commented: "The boxed set offers the most comprehensive and, for most listeners, exhaustive documentation of Trane's time with the label... It reveals the saxophonist still in larval stage and not yet the compellingly beautiful imago of the Atlantic years."

== Track listing ==
(Original album, and recording date, for each track listed in parentheses)

=== CD1 ===
1. Tenor Madness (Sonny Rollins – Tenor Madness – 5/24/56)
2. Weeja (Elmo Hope – Informal Jazz – 5/7/56)
3. Polka Dots And Moonbeams (Elmo Hope – Informal Jazz - 5/7/56)
4. On It (Elmo Hope – Informal Jazz – 5/7/56)
5. Avalon (Elmo Hope – Informal Jazz – 5/7/56)
6. Tenor Conclave (Tenor Conclave – 9/7/56)
7. How Deep is the Ocean? (Tenor Conclave – 9/7/56)

=== CD2 ===
1. Just You, Just Me (Tenor Conclave – 9/7/56)
2. Bob's Boys (Tenor Conclave – 9/7/56)
3. Mating Call (Tadd Dameron – Mating Call – 11/30/56)
4. Soultrane (Tadd Dameron – Mating Call – 11/30/56)
5. Gnid (Tadd Dameron – Mating Call – 11/30/56)
6. Super Jet (Tadd Dameron – Mating Call – 11/30/56)
7. On A Misty Night (Tadd Dameron – Mating Call – 11/30/56)
8. Romas (Tadd Dameron – Mating Call – 11/30/56)
9. Soul Eyes (Interplay for 2 Trumpets and 2 Tenors – 3/22/57)

=== CD3 ===
1. Anatomy (Interplay for 2 Trumpets and 2 Tenors – 3/22/57)
2. Interplay (Interplay for 2 Trumpets and 2 Tenors – 3/22/57)
3. Light Blue (Interplay for 2 Trumpets and 2 Tenors – 3/22/57)
4. C.T.A. (Art Taylor – Taylor's Wailers – 3/22/57)
5. Eclypso (The Cats – 4/18/57)
6. Solacium (The Cats – 4/18/57)
7. Minor Mishap (The Cats – 4/18/57)
8. Tommy's Tune (The Cats – 4/18/57)

=== CD4 ===
1. Dakar (Baritones and French Horns – 4/20/57)
2. Mary's Blues (Baritones and French Horns – 4/20/57)
3. Route 4 (Baritones and French Horns – 4/20/57)
4. Velvet Scene (Baritones and French Horns – 4/20/57)
5. Witches' Pit (Baritones and French Horns – 4/20/57)
6. Cat Walk (Baritones and French Horns – 4/20/57)
7. Pot Pourri (Mal Waldron – Mal/2 – 4/19/57)
8. J.M.'s Dream Doll (Mal Waldron – Mal/2 – 4/19/57)
9. Don't Explain (Mal Waldron – Mal/2 – 4/19/57)
10. Falling In Love With Love (Mal Waldron – The Dealers – 4/19/57)

=== CD5 ===
1. Blue Calypso (Mal Waldron – The Dealers – 4/19/57)
2. The Way You Look Tonight (Mal Waldron – Mal/2 – 5/17/57)
3. From This Moment On (Mal Waldron – Mal/2 – 5/17/57)
4. One By One (Mal Waldron – Mal/2 – 5/17/57)
5. Cattin' (Cattin' with Coltrane and Quinichette – 5/17/57)
6. Anatomy (Cattin' with Coltrane and Quinichette – 5/17/57)
7. Vodka (Cattin' with Coltrane and Quinichette – 5/17/57)
8. Sunday (Cattin' with Coltrane and Quinichette – 5/17/57)

=== CD6 ===
1. Straight Street (Coltrane – 5/31/57)
2. While My Lady Sleeps (Coltrane – 5/31/57)
3. Chronic Blues (Coltrane – 5/31/57)
4. Bakai (Coltrane - 5/31/57)
5. Violets For Your Furs (Coltrane – 5/31/57)
6. Time Was (Coltrane – 5/31/57)
7. I Hear A Rhapsody (Lush Life – 5/31/57)
8. Trane's Slow Blues (Lush Life – 8/16/57)
9. Slowtrane (The Last Trane – 8/16/57)
10. Like Someone in Love (Lush Life – 8/16/57)
11. I Love You (Lush Life – 8/16/57)

=== CD7 ===
1. Dealin' (Take 1) (Mal Waldron – The Dealers – 9/20/57)
2. Dealin' (Take 2) (Wheelin' & Dealin' – 9/20/57)
3. Wheelin' (Take 1) (Mal Waldron – The Dealers – 9/20/57)
4. Wheelin' (Take 2) (Wheelin' & Dealin' – 9/20/57)
5. Robbin's Nest (Wheelin' & Dealin' – 9/20/57)
6. Things Ain't What They Used To Be (Wheelin' & Dealin' – 9/20/57)

=== CD8 ===
1. You Leave Me Breathless (John Coltrane with the Red Garland Trio a.k.a. Traneing In – 8/23/57)
2. Bass Blues (John Coltrane with the Red Garland Trio a.k.a. Traneing In – 8/23/57)
3. Soft Lights And Sweet Music (John Coltrane with the Red Garland Trio a.k.a. Traneing In – 8/23/57)
4. Traneing In (John Coltrane with the Red Garland Trio a.k.a. Traneing In – 8/23/57)
5. Slow Dance (John Coltrane with the Red Garland Trio a.k.a. Traneing In – 8/23/57)
6. Our Delight (Red Garland – All Mornin' Long – 11/15/57)
7. They Can't Take That Away From Me (Red Garland – All Mornin' Long – 11/15/57)
8. Woody'n You (Red Garland – Soul Junction – 11/15/57)
9. I Got It Bad And That Ain't Good (Red Garland – Soul Junction – 11/15/57)

=== CD9 ===
1. Undecided (Red Garland – High Pressure – 12/13/57)
2. Soul Junction (Red Garland – Soul Junction – 11/15/57)
3. What Is There To Say? (Red Garland – High Pressure – 12/13/57)
4. Birk's Works (Red Garland – Soul Junction – 11/15/57)
5. Hallelujah (Red Garland – Soul Junction – 11/15/57)
6. All Mornin' Long (Red Garland – All Mornin' Long – 11/15/57)

=== CD10 ===
1. Billie's Bounce (Red Garland – Dig It! – 12/13/57)
2. Solitude (Red Garland – High Pressure – 12/13/57)
3. Two Bass Hit (Red Garland – High Pressure – 12/13/57)
4. Soft Winds (Red Garland – High Pressure – 12/13/57)
5. Lazy Mae (Red Garland – Dig It! – 12/13/57)
6. Under Paris Skies (Ray Draper - The Ray Draper Quintet featuring John Coltrane – 12/20/57)
7. Two Sons (Ray Draper - The Ray Draper Quintet featuring John Coltrane – 12/20/57)

=== CD11 ===
1. Clifford's Kappa (Ray Draper - The Ray Draper Quintet featuring John Coltrane - 12/20/57)
2. Filide (The Believer) (Ray Draper – The Ray Draper Quintet featuring John Coltrane - 12/20/57)
3. Paul's Pal (The Believer – 1958) (Ray Draper - The Ray Draper Quintet featuring John Coltrane – 12/20/57)
4. Ammon Joy (Gene Ammons – Groove Blues – 1/3/58)
5. Groove Blues (Gene Ammons – Groove Blues – 1/3/58)
6. The Real McCoy (Gene Ammons – The Big Sound – 1/3/58)
7. It Might As Well Be Spring (Gene Ammons – Groove Blues – 1/3/58)

=== CD12 ===
1. Lush Life (Lush Life 1/10/58)
2. The Believer (The Believer 1/10/58)
3. Nakatini Serenade (The Believer 1/10/58)
4. Come Rain or Come Shine (The Last Trane – 1/10/1958)
5. Lover (The Last Trane – 1/10/58)
6. Russian Lullaby (Soultrane – 2/7/58)
7. Theme For Ernie (Soultrane – 2/7/58)

=== CD13 ===
1. You Say You Care (Soultrane – 2/7/58)
2. Good Bait (Soultrane – 2/7/58)
3. I Want To Talk About You (Soultrane – 2/7/58)
4. Lyresto (Kenny Burrell – Kenny Burrell and John Coltrane - 3/7/58)
5. Why Was I Born? (Kenny Burrell – Kenny Burrell and John Coltrane – 3/7/58)
6. Freight Trane (Kenny Burrell – Kenny Burrell and John Coltrane – 3/7/58)
7. I Never Knew (Kenny Burrell – Kenny Burrell and John Coltrane – 3/7/58)
8. Big Paul (Kenny Burrell – Kenny Burrell and John Coltrane – 3/7/58)

=== CD14 ===
1. Rise 'N' Shine (Settin' the Pace – 3/26/58)
2. "I See Your Face Before Me" (Settin' the Pace – 3/26/58)
3. If There Is Someone Lovelier Than You (Settin' the Pace – 3/26/58)
4. Little Melonae (Settin' the Pace – 3/26/58)
5. By The Numbers (The Last Trane – 3/26/58)
6. Black Pearls (Black Pearls – 5/23/58)

=== CD15 ===
1. Lover Come Back To Me (Black Pearls – 5/23/58)
2. Sweet Sapphire Blues (Black Pearls - 5/23/58)
3. Spring Is Here (Standard Coltrane – 7/11/58)
4. Invitation (Standard Coltrane – 7/11/58)
5. I'm A Dreamer, Aren't We All (Bahia - 7/11/58)
6. Love Thy Neighbor (Stardust – 7/11/58)
7. Don't Take Your Love From Me (Standard Coltrane – 7/11/58)

=== CD16 ===
1. Stardust (Stardust – 7/11/58)
2. My Ideal (Bahia - 7/11/58)
3. I'll Get By (Standard Coltrane – 7/11/58)
4. Do I Love You Because You're Beautiful? (The Believer – 12/26/58)
5. Then I'll Be Tired Of You (Stardust - 12/26/58)
6. Something I Dreamed Last Night (Bahia - 12/26/58)
7. Bahia (Bahia - 12/26/58)
8. Goldsboro Express (Bahia - 12/26/58)
9. Time After Time (Stardust - 12/26/58)
