= Settin' the Pace =

Studio album by John Coltrane
- Released: December 1961
- Recorded: March 26, 1958
- Studio: Van Gelder (Hackensack)
- Genres: Jazz; hard bop
- Length: 40:42 (Original LP); 52:42 (2008 Reissue)
- Labels: Prestige; PRLP 7213
- Producer: Bob Weinstock

John Coltrane chronology
Olé Coltrane (1961)	Settin' the Pace (1961)	Live! at the Village Vanguard (1962)

Settin' the Pace is a studio album by the jazz musician and composer John Coltrane. It was released in December 1961 through Prestige Records. It is assembled from previously unissued tracks from a recording session at the studio of Rudy Van Gelder in Hackensack, New Jersey in 1958. Coltrane on tenor saxophone is accompanied by Red Garland on piano, Paul Chambers on bass, and Art Taylor on drums. With Garland and Chambers, Coltrane had played together since at least October 1955 in Miles Davis' band. With Art Taylor they were part of the Tenor Conclave recordings in September 1956. As a quartet they had already recorded two albums for Prestige, John Coltrane with the Red Garland Trio and Soultrane. The material the quartet recorded on this session were extended interpretations of three popular songs and "Little Melonae", a classic bebop tune written by Jackie McLean. Of note is Coltrane's use of the sheets of sound technique, particularly on "Little Melonae".

== Release history ==
As Coltrane's profile increased during the 1960s, Prestige released recordings without Coltrane's input or approval. The original mono recordings were 'electronically rechannelled' to 'fake stereo' in 1970 and released on Prestige's "Jazz Classic Series" as Trane's Reign (PRT 7746). Original Jazz Classics reissued the album again in 1983 on LP in true stereo. (There may have been true stereo releases prior to this one, however.) The first digitally remastered CD release followed in 1987. A technically advanced remastering (XRCD) was produced by Akira Taguchi for JVC in 2008 with an additional bonus track.

== Reception ==
Professional ratings
Review scores
Source	Rating
AllMusic	4/5 stars
The Penguin Guide to Jazz	3/4 stars
The Rolling Stone Album Guide	4/5 stars
The Virgin Encyclopedia of Jazz	3/5 stars

A reviewer for AllMusic wrote: "This is not the fire-breathing saxophonist of the mid-'60s, but a player who was beginning to push against the boundaries, all the while playing with thoughtful, imaginative lyricism... Anyone who likes the mainstream jazz of the '50s, or Miles' music of that time, or Coltrane fans who want to hear their idol in an easygoing context, should pick this up."

The authors of The Penguin Guide to Jazz Recordings stated that, in comparison with Soultrane, Settin' the Pace "is much less venturesome and might easily be mistaken for a second-string selection from the same date."

Justin Gawaziuk of All About Jazz commented: "Settin' the Pace may not be the definitive lyrical album..., but it still ranks close to [Coltrane's] best work. Chronologically, it is key in the development of jazz in the late 1950s and development of Coltrane as a player. Highly recommended!"

Progrography's Dave Connolly remarked: "The approach on this session seems formulaic: state the theme, cram in about five minutes (or more) of solos and return to the main theme at the end. I'm glad these sessions weren't lost to time, but whether or not you find time for it is a question of how much time in your life you've carved out for Coltrane."

== Track listing ==
No.	Title	Writer(s)	Length
1.	"I See Your Face Before Me"	Howard Dietz; Arthur Schwartz	9:59
2.	"If There Is Someone Lovelier Than You"	Dietz; Schwartz	9:22
3.	"Little Melonae"	Jackie McLean	14:05
4.	"Rise 'n' Shine"	Buddy DeSylva; Vincent Youmans	7:16
Total length:			40:42

=== 2008 reissue bonus track ===
No.	Title	Writer(s)	Length
5.	"By the Numbers"	Coltrane	12:00
Total length:			52:42

== Personnel ==
- John Coltrane – tenor saxophone
- Red Garland – piano
- Paul Chambers – bass
- Art Taylor – drums
