= The Magic Touch (album) =

1962 studio album by Tadd Dameron

Studio album by Tadd Dameron
- Released: 1962
- Recorded: New York, February – April, 1962
- Genre: Jazz
- Label: Riverside / Original Jazz Classics
- Producer: Orrin Keepnews

Tadd Dameron chronology
Mating Call (1957)	The Magic Touch (1962)

Professional ratings
Review scores
Source	Rating
DownBeat	3/5 stars
AllMusic	4.5/5 stars
New Record Mirror	4/5 stars
The Rolling Stone Jazz Record Guide	4/5 stars
The Penguin Guide to Jazz Recordings	2.5/4 stars

The Magic Touch is a 1962 album by jazz pianist and arranger Tadd Dameron and His Orchestra, released on Riverside Records. It was also Dameron's final completed work before his death three years later.

The AllMusic review says of the line-up that "one has to be in awe of them, and that only Dameron was able to convene such a band of extraordinary jazz performers in their prime."

The album has since been reissued many times on Original Jazz Classics.

== Reception ==
In his DownBeat magazine review, critic John S. Wilson awarded the album three stars and wrote: "Although Dameron's arrangements are, for the most part, designed as settings for soloists, neither the soloists nor the arrangements generate much interest."

By contrast, AllMusic gave the album 4.5 stars, concluding: "As close to a definitive recording as Dameron issued, and considering his very small discography, The Magic Touch is a recording that all modern jazz lovers need to own and take further lessons from."

== Track listing ==
All songs composed by Dameron except where noted.

1. "On a Misty Night"
2. "Fontainebleau"
3. "Just Plain Talkin'"
4. "If You Could See Me Now" (Dameron, Sigman)
5. "Our Delight"
6. "Dial B for Beauty"
7. "Look, Stop and Listen "
8. "Bevan's Birthday"
9. "You're a Joy"
10. "Swift as the Wind"

== Personnel ==
- Tadd Dameron - Piano, Arranger, Conductor
- Clark Terry - Trumpet
- Ernie Royal - Trumpet
- Charlie Shavers - Trumpet
- Joe Wilder - Trumpet
- Jimmy Cleveland - Trombone
- Britt Woodman - Trombone
- Julius Watkins - French Horn
- Jerry Dodgion - Alto Sax, Flute
- Leo Wright - Alto Sax, Flute
- Jerome Richardson - Tenor Sax, Flute
- Johnny Griffin - Tenor Sax
- Tate Houston - Baritone Sax
- Bill Evans - Piano
- Ron Carter - Bass
- George Duvivier - Bass
- Philly Joe Jones - Drums
- Barbara Winfield - Vocals (tracks 4, 9)

== Production ==
- Ken Deardoff - Design
- Phil DeLancie - Digital Remastering
- Ray Fowler - Engineer
- Joe Goldberg - Liner Notes
- Orrin Keepnews - Producer
- Steve Schapiro - Photography
