= Coltrane "Live" at the Village Vanguard =

Live album by John Coltrane
- Released: February 1962
- Recorded: November 1961
- Venues: Village Vanguard, New York City
- Genre: Jazz
- Length: 36:31
- Labels: Impulse! Records; A-10
- Producer: Bob Thiele

John Coltrane chronology
Settin' the Pace (1961)	Coltrane "Live" at the Village Vanguard (1962)	Coltrane Plays the Blues (1962)

Coltrane "Live" at the Village Vanguard is a live album by the jazz musician and composer John Coltrane. It was released in February 1962 through Impulse Records. It is the first album to feature the members of the classic quartet of Coltrane with McCoy Tyner, Jimmy Garrison, and Elvin Jones, as well as the first Coltrane live album to be issued. In contrast to his previous album for Impulse!, this one generated much turmoil among both critics and audience alike with its challenging music.

== Background ==
In 1961, Coltrane created controversy with the hiring of Eric Dolphy and with the kind of music his band was playing. In reaction to the Quintet's residency at the Village Vanguard in New York City starting in late October 1961, DownBeat critic John Tynan described the group as "musical nonsense being peddled in the name of jazz" and "a horrifying demonstration of what appears to be a growing anti-jazz trend." European critics and audiences also had difficulty with appearances earlier in the year, finding the group's music, especially that of Coltrane and Dolphy, puzzling and difficult to follow. DownBeat magazine editor Don DeMichael took the step of inviting the pair to defend themselves, a piece appearing in the April 12, 1962 issue entitled "John Coltrane and Eric Dolphy Answer the Critics".

It was the idea of new producer Bob Thiele to record Coltrane live over four nights in early November, Thiele meeting the saxophonist for the first time face-to-face at the club. This commenced a close working relationship between Thiele and Coltrane that would last for the rest of his time at Impulse!, Thiele producing virtually every subsequent album. Thiele secured Coltrane's trust right away by not insisting he record his most popular song, "My Favorite Things", during these shows. Recording engineer Rudy Van Gelder set up his equipment at a table by the stage, and for these concerts Coltrane often enhanced the Quintet by adding tampura, contrabassoon, oboe, or a second bass.

These were Reggie Workman's final recordings with the group, as by December 1961 Garrison was announced as his replacement, stabilizing a line-up that would remain constant for the next four years. (Garrison's performance on the album marked the first time he had played with the group.)

Two additional recordings taken from these shows appeared on the album Impressions, "Impressions" and "India". On September 23, 1997, Impulse! issued a box set The Complete 1961 Village Vanguard Recordings, with recordings from all four nights chronologically on four compact discs.

== Music ==
Three performances (two original compositions and one jazz standard) were chosen for the album. "Spiritual", played by a quintet featuring Coltrane on tenor and soprano saxophones (the album credits only list the soprano; however, Coltrane acknowledged playing both instruments on the piece in a 1966 interview) and Eric Dolphy on bass clarinet, is possibly an adaptation of "Nobody Knows de Trouble I See" published in The Book of American Negro Spirituals by James Weldon Johnson. Coltrane stated: "It's a piece we'd been working with for some time because I wanted to make sure before we recorded it that we would be able to get the original emotional essence of the spiritual." "Softly, as in a Morning Sunrise", a pop standard, is played by a quartet with Coltrane again on soprano sax. Coltrane stated that the piece "seems to me to round out the two originals, and I especially like the swinging by Jones..."

The third selection, the blues "Chasin' the Trane", is seen by Ashley Kahn in his book about the Impulse! label as "the birth cry of sixties avant-garde jazz: an outpouring of stylistic tongues and melodic ideas that linked the bebop dexterity and daring of the past with a free, stripped-bare, spiritually charged future," and was described by Coltrane biographer Ben Ratliff as "a great statement", his "landmark performance of the period", and "one of the most important recordings in jazz as it is currently practiced." One aspect of the track is the fact that it was recorded as a trio, without Tyner, freeing Coltrane, who plays tenor sax, from the harmonic underpinnings normally provided by the piano. Jimmy Garrison, the bassist on "Chasin' the Trane", had recently played with Ornette Coleman's piano-less quartet, and, in a 1961 interview prior to the recording, Coltrane expressed great admiration for Coleman and acknowledged his influence, stating that "there probably will be some songs in the future that we're going to play, just as Ornette does, with no accompaniment from the piano at all." Coltrane also recalled: "When I played with Monk... I played many times without a piano: Monk... after two pieces, would return to the dressing room or even stand looking out the window for two or three hours. So, we played without a piano."

The absence of a piano, along with a rhythm section playing with what Gary Giddins called "formidable concentration", allowed Coltrane to "stretch out" on "Chasin' the Trane". Coltrane stated that "the melody not only wasn't written but it wasn't even conceived before we played it. We set the tempo, and in we went." (Ratliff wrote that the piece "just vaults into being," and is "remarkable for the way it starts at absolute full intensity and retains that level without peaking or deflating.") According to Ratliff, in his solo, Coltrane "trips up the internal 12-bar logic. He causes patterns to change every bar, or stretches a single pattern across the 2nd and 3rd bar, or the 4th and 5th, or three in a row. In under a minute, Garrison, walking in hiccupped phrasing... loosens himself from the 12-bar structure; Coltrane (and Jones) still demarcate the end of the 12 bars by the beginning of a new melodic idea and an emphatic cymbal crash... at two and a half minutes in, Coltrane starts to disregard the 12-bar markers, and he's off, at large, exploring texture, fooling with short, sweet melodies." Aspects of the solo reflect the influence of tenor sax player John Gilmore, best known for his playing with Sun Ra: "run-on language of short motivic cells". Coltrane confirmed the Gilmore connection, stating: "I'd listened to John Gilmore kinda closely before I made 'Chasin' the Trane'... So some of those things on there are really direct influences of listening to this cat."

Nat Hentoff wrote that Coltrane's solo on "Chasin' the Trane" is "particularly fascinating for the astonishing variety of textures Coltrane draws from the full range of his horn," reflecting the fact that "when he developed his embouchure to reach the higher notes on the soprano, he started to think in higher pitch ranges for the tenor. He began to play much more of his instrument". Coltrane also explores multiphonics and split tones; Eric Nisenson wrote that "he squeals, wails, and cries through his saxophone" during the solo.

"Chasin' the Trane" is in part successful because of the tension between what Gary Giddins called Coltrane's "desire to pare down harmony and escape any form — chords, choruses, the tempered scale — that keeps him from an elusive grail of total expressiveness" with the fact that "Garrison and Jones follow him... but whenever he threatens to push beyond the blues, they bring him home." Giddins wrote: "In pushing jazz orthodoxies to but not through the wall, Coltrane employs everything he has learned in order to challenge the validity of what he had already mastered... No matter how far afield he goes, he upholds the playful quality of the theme, recurrent and childlike, for the duration of the performance." Ratliff stated that "Chasin' the Trane" "is a unifier. This recording, precisely, is what free jazz and straight-ahead jazz... have in common."

== Reception ==
Professional ratings
Review scores
Source	Rating
Allmusic	4.5/5 stars
And It Don't Stop	A
DownBeat	3.5/5 stars
Pitchfork	8.5/10
The Rolling Stone Jazz Record Guide	5/5 stars

Pursuant to the article by Coltrane and Dolphy, for the following April 26 issue DownBeat presented two reviews of Live! at the Village Vanguard, both focusing on "Chasin' the Trane". Pete Welding described it as "a torrential and anguished outpouring, delivered with unmistakable power, conviction, and near-demonic ferocity." On the other hand, Ira Gitler, who had coined the phrase "sheets of sound", stated that "Coltrane may be searching for new avenues of expression, but if it is going to take this form of yawps, squawks, and countless repetitive runs, then it should be confined to the woodshed."

Writing in 2020 in his "Consumer Guide" column, Robert Christgau found the "relaxed "quietude of side one" to be "lovely enough" but went on to say, "this endlessly rereleased album is sacred for one reason: a second side consisting entirely of the 16-minute 'Chasin' the Trane,'" which he regarded as equal in importance to Louis Armstrong's "West End Blues" (1928) and the Beatles' "She Loves You" (1963). He said the album track "both evoked and rendered unto history a theretofore unknown species of chaotic command", with "Trane wailing and whaling on tenor as Jones furiously drives and depth-bombs and bassist Jimmy Garrison tirelessly anchors and intensifies (and Dolphy is said to interpose brief alto commentary, though I’ve given up on figuring out where)".

Writers have acknowledged the sheer emotional impact of "Chasin' the Trane". In his liner notes, Nat Hentoff wrote: "Listening to Coltrane in this unyielding performance is so absorbing because it allows the outsider to be present at an uncompromising act of spontaneous creation. Usually, even in jazz, some polishing has been done beforehand to avoid at least some of the dangers of unbridled improvisation; but here the whole piece comes newly and unpredictably alive before us. It is possible, therefore, to experience vicariously that rare contemporary phenomenon - a man going for broke. And in public no less. If you can open yourself emotionally to so relentless a self-exploration, you can gain considerable insight into the marrow of the jazz experience and into Coltrane's own indomitably resourceful musicianship through this whirlpool of blues."

Eric Nisenson wrote that on "Chasin' the Trane", "Coltrane's playing is the most intensely emotional of his career... Analyzing the tune technically is beside the point - it is an experience, a catharsis shared by Coltrane and his audience, and it is unlike anything that preceded it... 'Chasin' the Trane' is especially hair-raising because it is clear that Coltrane has dug deeply into his psyche to create this music - 'cleaning the mirror,' as he would put it a few years later. The music sounds as if it is a portrait of the raw stuff of his inner being, music so frankly confessional we feel slightly embarrassed listening to it. It is, in its subjectivity, in the tradition of the most innovative twentieth-century art and literature. This type of inner-driven improvising was key to Coltrane's quest. By looking within, he was trying to find a center of both that musical 'essence' and the mind of God. From here on, most of his music would similarly be a result of his 'cleaning the mirror.'"

Gary Giddins stated that "Chasin' the Trane" was "the most vivid documentation of [Coltrane's] struggle to date," describing it as "preeminent and indispensable... a sweat-soaked fury of resolute musical invention" He wrote: "Gone are the piano, routine theme, harmonic substitutions, auxiliary soloist(s), call-and-response, and conventional duration. He attenuates the music still more by draining his virtuoso technique — sanding the shine off his sound, indulging a glossary of false notes, overtones, and vocalisms. He pushes himself and the blues to the limits of endurance, drawing light from dark, pleasure from pain, liberation from constraint."

Coltrane biographer J. C. Thomas described "Chasin' the Trane" as "fifteen minutes and fifty-five seconds of energetic, expressive changes and counterchanges, interpolations and improvisations in a continuous stream-of-consciousness creation that would leave listeners shaking their heads not in negation but disbelief that such a difficult project had not only been attempted but had also emerged with such musically successful results." He observed that, during the performance and recording, "Max Gordon was nodding his head so forcefully that it seemed ready to snap off... Bob Thiele was tapping his feet hard enough to wear down his heels, puffing so fiercely on his pipe that he nearly insulated himself in a smoke screen of his own making... Rudy van Gelder was a study in near-perpetual motion, following Coltrane around as closely as a bill collector and keeping one of his microphones just inches from the leader's tenor saxophone at all times, even though he had to climb over half the customers to do it." (Van Gelder suggested the title "Chasin' the Trane" for the previously untitled piece partly as a result of his having to scramble to maintain good microphone placement "with Coltrane swinging his saxophone and stalking the small stage of the basement club.")

Archie Shepp recalled the first time he heard "Chasin' the Trane": "I was living in a loft in [New York's] East Village in 1962. I heard my neighbor's record player booming and I knew it was Trane. But the piano never came in. As he began to develop the line it became clear that the structure wasn't so apparent and he was playing around with sounds: playing way above the normal scale of the horn, neutral and freak notes, overtones, and so on. I found it as shocking a piece of music as Stravinsky's 'Rite of Spring' was in his day... the song's form is much less important than the melody itself, and the relation between the melody and the rhythm. Sonny Rollins had worked without piano before, but his playing was primarily harmonically oriented — and Ornette Coleman too, who was totally aharmonic. Coltrane was able to integrate the two, to put everything in context, in such a sophisticated way that it influenced everybody. [Without the piano] it's the point where the Coltrane Quartet became an avant-garde trio... ['Chasin' the Trane' was] a synthesis of what came before. You could say that it's free jazz, but it's not totally free because there are still very strong structural indications: chords, harmony. Trane said that 'Giant Steps' [1959] was sort of the end of one phase where he had exhausted all of the permutations of chords. 'Chasin' the Trane' was another door that opened: the use of sound for sound itself... I think it's one of the most innovative pieces in the history of African-American improvised music, as important as Charlie Parker's 'Ko-Ko' [1945] or Coleman Hawkins' 'Body and Soul' [1939]. That's the greatness of Trane, that he always kept the feeling of dance and the spiritual elements so important to what they used to call 'hot jazz.' That's why his peers all respected him so much, because he didn't throw the baby out with the bathwater."

== Track listing ==
All tracks written by John Coltrane, except where noted.

Side one
No.	Title	Writer(s)	Length
1.	"Spiritual"		13:47
2.	"Softly, as in a Morning Sunrise"	Sigmund Romberg, Oscar Hammerstein II	6:36

Side two
No.	Title	Length
1.	"Chasin' the Trane"	16:08
Total length:		36:31

== Personnel ==
- John Coltrane — soprano and tenor saxophone
- Eric Dolphy — bass clarinet on "Spiritual"
- McCoy Tyner — piano on side one
- Reggie Workman — bass on side one
- Jimmy Garrison — bass on side two
- Elvin Jones — drums

Technical

- Pete Turner — photography
