= Black Pearls =

Studio album by John Coltrane
- Released: August 1964
- Recorded: May 23, 1958
- Studios: Van Gelder Studio, Hackensack
- Genre: Jazz
- Length: 38:53
- Labels: Prestige; PRLP 7316
- Producer: Bob Weinstock

John Coltrane chronology
Crescent (1964)	Black Pearls (1964)	A Love Supreme (1965)

Black Pearls is a studio album by American jazz musician John Coltrane, released in 1964 on Prestige Records. It was recorded at a single recording session on May 23, 1958, at the studio of Rudy Van Gelder in Hackensack, New Jersey.

On that Friday session, "the songs weren't long enough for a whole album", recalled producer Bob Weinstock in 2001, "so I said 'Let's do a slow blues to finish it out'." Coltrane invited Weinstock to write the song on the spot, but he didn't know music, so Coltrane replied "'Just tell me what you want me to play. Should it go like this?' and he would play some notes. After having played a rough melody, he'd say 'Okay, you wrote it.' That was the genesis of 'Sweet Sapphire Blues'".

The title track is a sustained exhibition of Coltrane's sheets of sound technique during his solo.

== Reception ==
Professional ratings
Review scores
Source	Rating
AllMusic	4/5 stars
DownBeat	4/5 stars
The Penguin Guide to Jazz Recordings	2/4 stars
The Rolling Stone Jazz Record Guide	3/5 stars

In a review for AllMusic, giving the record four stars out of five, Lindsay Planer stated that the album "captures Coltrane at the height of perfecting the intense volley that would garner the name 'sheets of sound'," but noted that it "seems a bit ambiguous when placed in a more historical context."

DownBeat's Don Nelson wrote: "Despite a commanding technique, [Coltrane] is still not in control." However, his "involvement with his music and instrument is total."

The authors of The Penguin Guide to Jazz Recordings stated that, along with Om, the album is "the drabbest session in the whole Coltrane canon."

== Track listing ==
=== Side one ===
No.	Title	Writer(s)	Length
1.	"Black Pearls"	Coltrane	13:13
2.	"Lover, Come Back to Me"	Oscar Hammerstein II, Sigmund Romberg	7:27
Total length:			20:40

=== Side two ===
No.	Title	Writer(s)	Length
1.	"Sweet Sapphire Blues"	Bob Weinstock	18:13
Total length:			38:53

== Personnel ==
- John Coltrane – tenor saxophone
- Donald Byrd – trumpet
- Red Garland – piano
- Paul Chambers – bass
- Art Taylor – drums
