= It's a Blue World (Red Garland album) =

Studio album by The Red Garland Trio
- Released: December 1970
- Recorded: February 7, 1958; Van Gelder Studio, Hackensack, New Jersey
- Genre: Jazz
- Length: 35:50
- Label: Prestige; PRLP 7838
- Producer: Bob Weinstock

Red Garland chronology
Dig It! (1962)	It's a Blue World (1970)	Manteca (1958)

Professional ratings
Review scores
Source	Rating
AllMusic	4/5 stars
The Penguin Guide to Jazz Recordings	3/4 stars

It's a Blue World is an album by jazz pianist Red Garland, recorded in 1958 but not released on Prestige Records until 1970.

== Track listing ==
1. "This Can't Be Love" (Richard Rodgers, Lorenz Hart) – 8:30
2. "Since I Fell for You" (Buddy Johnson) – 12:43
3. "Crazy Rhythm" (Irving Caesar, Joseph Meyer, Roger Wolfe Kahn) – 3.27
4. "Teach Me Tonight" (Gene de Paul, Sammy Cahn) – 9:03
5. "It's a Blue World" (Robert Wright, George Forrest) – 5:34

== Personnel ==
- Red Garland – piano
- Paul Chambers – double bass
- Art Taylor – drums
