= Standard Coltrane =

Studio album by John Coltrane
- Released: October 2, 1962
- Recorded: July 11, 1958
- Studio: Van Gelder (Hackensack)
- Genres: Jazz; hard bop
- Length: 34:46
- Labels: Prestige; PRLP 7243
- Producer: Bob Weinstock

John Coltrane chronology
Coltrane (1962)	Standard Coltrane (1962)	Duke Ellington & John Coltrane (1963)

Standard Coltrane is an album by the jazz musician and composer John Coltrane. It was released in October 1962 by Prestige Records. It was recorded at a single recording session at the studio of Rudy Van Gelder in Hackensack, New Jersey, in 1958. This album was rereleased in 1970 as The Master (PR 7825) with that version rereleased on CD to include the other four tunes recorded at the same 11 July session. Those other tunes had previously been released on two other albums assembled from unissued recordings (Stardust and Bahia).

== Reception ==
Professional ratings
Review scores
Source	Rating
DownBeat	4/5 stars
The Penguin Guide to Jazz Recordings	3/4 stars
AllMusic	3/5 stars

In a review for AllMusic, Steve Leggett stated that the album is "more historical than vital or transitional, although it's pleasant enough."

The authors of The Penguin Guide to Jazz called the album "a low-intensity operation with the emphasis on ballads," and commented: "Harden's warm, unemphatic trumpet-playing is perfectly appropriate to the setting, and it rarely attempts anything that will scare the horses. He and the leader seem to have worked out the approach only rather notionally, and each of their improvisations has an informal, loose-limbed quality that is attractive but hardly dynamic."

== Track listing ==
=== Side one ===
No.	Title	Writer(s)	Length
1.	"Don't Take Your Love From Me"	Henry Nemo	9:17
2.	"I'll Get By"	Fred Ahlert, Roy Turk	8:12
Total length:			17:29

=== Side two ===
No.	Title	Writer(s)	Length
1.	"Spring Is Here"	Lorenz Hart, Richard Rodgers	6:55
2.	"Invitation"	Bronislau Kaper, Paul Francis Webster	10:22
Total length:			17:17 34:46

== Personnel ==
- John Coltrane – tenor saxophone
- Wilbur Harden – trumpet, flugelhorn
- Red Garland – piano
- Paul Chambers – bass
- Jimmy Cobb – drums
