= Duke Ellington & John Coltrane =

Studio album by Duke Ellington and John Coltrane
- Released: January 1963
- Recorded: September 26, 1962
- Studio: Van Gelder (Englewood Cliffs)
- Genre: Jazz
- Length: 34:42
- Label: Impulse!
- Producer: Bob Thiele

Duke Ellington chronology
Money Jungle (1963)	Duke Ellington & John Coltrane (1963)	Afro-Bossa (1963)

John Coltrane chronology
Standard Coltrane (1962)	Duke Ellington & John Coltrane (1963)	Ballads (1963)

Professional ratings
Review scores
Source	Rating
AllMusic	5/5 stars
DownBeat	4/5 stars
The Encyclopedia of Popular Music	4/5 stars
The Penguin Guide to Jazz Recordings	3.5/4 stars
The Rolling Stone Jazz Record Guide	4/5 stars

Duke Ellington & John Coltrane is an album by the American jazz musicians Duke Ellington and John Coltrane. It was released in January 1963 through Impulse! Records.

The album was one of Ellington's many collaborations in the early 1960s with musicians such as Count Basie, Louis Armstrong, Coleman Hawkins, Max Roach, and Charles Mingus, and placed him with a quartet rather than a big band. The quartet was filled out by the bassist and drummer from either of their bands. The album featured Ellington standards (e.g., "In a Sentimental Mood"), new Ellington compositions, and a new Coltrane composition ("Big Nick").

Coltrane said of the session:

I was really honored to have the opportunity of working with Duke. It was a wonderful experience. He has set standards I haven't caught up with yet. I would have liked to have worked over all those numbers again, but then I guess the performances wouldn't have had the same spontaneity. And they mightn't have been any better!

== Track listing ==
Side one
No.	Title	Writer(s)	Length
1.	"In a Sentimental Mood"	Irving Mills; Duke Ellington; Manny Kurtz	4:14
2.	"Take the Coltrane"	Ellington	4:42
3.	"Big Nick"	John Coltrane	4:30
4.	"Stevie"	Ellington	4:22

Side two
No.	Title	Writer(s)	Length
1.	"My Little Brown Book"	Billy Strayhorn	5:20
2.	"Angelica"	Ellington	6:00
3.	"The Feeling of Jazz"	Ellington; Bobby Troup; George T. Simon	5:34

== Personnel ==
- Duke Ellington – piano
- John Coltrane – tenor saxophone (all but track 3) and soprano saxophone (track 3)
- Elvin Jones – drums (tracks 1–3, 6)
- Jimmy Garrison – bass (tracks 2–3, 6)
- Aaron Bell – bass (tracks 1, 4–5, 7)
- Sam Woodyard – drums (tracks 4–5, 7)

== Charts ==
Chart performance for Duke Ellington & John Coltrane
Chart (2022)	Peak position
German Albums (Offizielle Top 100)	31
