= All Mornin' Long =

Studio album by The Red Garland Quintet
- Released: April 1958
- Recorded: November 15, 1957
- Studio: Van Gelder Studio, Hackensack, New Jersey
- Genre: Jazz, hard bop
- Length: 37:08
- Label: Prestige; PRLP 7130
- Producer: Bob Weinstock

The Red Garland Quintet chronology
John Coltrane with the Red Garland Trio (1958)	All Mornin' Long (1958)	Soul Junction (1960)

Professional ratings
Review scores
Source	Rating
Allmusic	3/5 stars
The Penguin Guide to Jazz Recordings	3/4 stars

All Mornin' Long is a studio album by the jazz pianist and composer Red Garland. It was released in April 1958 through Prestige Records. It features only three pieces, which belong to the hard bop subgenre and distinguish themselves by being fast-paced and bluesy. Critic Ira Gitler found the album satisfactory and said that the title piece was a "many-splendored, deep-dish demonstration of feeling, mood and melody".

== Track listing ==
1. "All Mornin' Long" (Red Garland) – 20:21
2. "They Can't Take That Away from Me" (George Gershwin, Ira Gershwin) – 10:28
3. "Our Delight" (Tadd Dameron) – 6:18

== Personnel ==
- Red Garland – piano
- John Coltrane – tenor sax
- Donald Byrd – trumpet
- George Joyner – bass
- Art Taylor – drums
