= Coltrane (1957 album) =

Studio album by John Coltrane
- Released: October 1957
- Recorded: May 31, 1957
- Studios: Van Gelder Studio; Hackensack, New Jersey
- Genre: Hard bop
- Length: 41:50
- Labels: Prestige; PRLP 7105
- Producer: Bob Weinstock

John Coltrane chronology
Coltrane (1957)	Blue Train (1958)

Professional ratings
Review scores
Source	Rating
AllMusic	4/5 stars
DownBeat	3/5 stars
The Penguin Guide to Jazz	3/4 stars
The Rolling Stone Jazz Record Guide	5/5 stars

Coltrane is a studio album by the American jazz musician John Coltrane. It was released in October 1957 through Prestige Records. The recordings took place at the studio of Rudy Van Gelder in Hackensack, New Jersey, and document Coltrane's first session as a leader. It has been reissued at times under the title of The First Trane!.

== Background ==
As a result of his exposure as a member of the Miles Davis Quintet, Prestige Records owner and producer Bob Weinstock offered Coltrane a recording contract. Dated April 9, 1957, it stipulated three albums per year at $300 per album. Coltrane had previously recorded as a sideman, and had co-led a session with Paul Quinichette (released in 1959 as Cattin' with Coltrane and Quinichette), but never as sole bandleader.

Coltrane had been fired by Davis in April 1957 for drug abuse, and had returned to Philadelphia to end his habit. He returned to New York City for mid-May sessions with Prestige, this one taking place the day after Memorial Day. By the summer, Coltrane would be recording with Thelonious Monk and playing as a member of Monk's quartet for the rest of the year.

For his debut, Coltrane chose a tune by his friend Calvin Massey, in addition to three standards including the relatively obscure "Time Was". Sidemen included Paul Chambers and Red Garland from the Davis band, and Philadelphia colleagues Johnnie Splawn and Albert Heath.

== Track listing ==
Side one
No.	Title	Writer(s)	Length
1.	"Bakai"	Calvin Massey	8:44
2.	"Violets for Your Furs"	Tom Adair, Matt Dennis	6:18
3.	"Time Was"	Gabriel Luna de la Fuente, Paz Miguel Prado, Bob Russell	7:31

Side two
No.	Title	Writer(s)	Length
1.	"Straight Street"	John Coltrane	6:21
2.	"While My Lady Sleeps"	Gus Kahn, Bronislaw Kaper	4:44
3.	"Chronic Blues"	John Coltrane	8:12

== Personnel ==
- John Coltrane – tenor saxophone
- Johnnie Splawn – trumpet on "Bakai", "Straight Street", "While My Lady Sleeps", "Chronic Blues"
- Sahib Shihab – baritone saxophone on "Bakai", "Straight Street", "Chronic Blues"
- Red Garland – piano on side one
- Mal Waldron – piano on side two
- Paul Chambers – bass
- Albert "Tootie" Heath – drums
