= Sheets of sound =

Music term coined in 1958

Sheets of sound was a term coined in 1958 by DownBeat magazine jazz critic Ira Gitler to describe the new, unique improvisational style of John Coltrane. Gitler first used the term on the liner notes for Soultrane (1958).

== Style ==
Coltrane, a saxophonist, employed extremely dense improvisational yet patterned lines consisting of high speed arpeggios and scale patterns played in rapid succession: hundreds of notes running from the lowest to highest registers. The lines are often faster than sixteenth notes, consisting of quintuplets, septuplets, etc., and can sound like glissandos. Coltrane invented this style while playing with Thelonious Monk and developed it further when he returned to Miles Davis' group.

== Vertical approach ==
Coltrane used the "sheets of sound" lines to liquidise and loosen the strict chords, modes, and harmonies of hard bop, whilst still adhering to them (at this stage in his musical development). Playing with the Miles Davis groups, in particular, gave Coltrane the free musical space in which to apply harmonic ideas to stacked chords and substitutions. Further, this open approach allowed Coltrane to arpeggiate three chords simultaneously, a style Monk initially taught Coltrane. The "three-on-one chord approach" gave the music a fluid, sweeping sound that was harmonically vertical. Concepts of vertical (chordal) versus horizontal (melody) are key ideas in the work of George Russell, whom Coltrane had recorded with in September 1958. This approach reflected Coltrane's fascination with third relations. Sometimes he used diminished chords, other times he used augmented chords. At times, Coltrane might use scales or licks in the passing keys instead of arpeggios. Coltrane employed these harmonic ideas during his "sheets of sound" stage in 1958. At other times, he would simply play rapid patterns of diminished-scales.

== Usage ==
The "sheets of sound" approach can be heard as early as the 1957 collaboration with Monk in solos like the one on "Trinkle, Tinkle" from the album Thelonious Monk with John Coltrane. Coltrane's live performance of "If I Were a Bell" with the Miles Davis sextet on September 9, 1958, well exemplifies his use of the "sheets of sound" during this stage of his career. In "Trane on the Track", an article published on October 16, 1958 in DownBeat magazine, Coltrane spoke to Ira Gitler about the sheets of sound, telling him, "Now it is not a thing of beauty, and the only way it would be justified is if it becomes that. If I can't work it through, I will drop it." Coltrane began using the style intermittently in 1959, preferring to incorporate it into his solos in a less abrupt manner.

== Selected recordings ==
- Blue Train (1958)
- John Coltrane with the Red Garland Trio (1958)
- Milestones (1958)
- Soultrane (1958)
- Kind of Blue (1959)
- Giant Steps (1960)
- Bags & Trane (1961)
- Thelonious Monk with John Coltrane (1961)
- Miles & Monk at Newport (1964)
- '58 Miles Featuring Stella By Starlight (1974)
- Thelonious Monk Quartet with John Coltrane at Carnegie Hall (2005)
