= Sugan (album) =

Studio album by Phil Woods with Red Garland
- Released: 1965
- Recorded: July 19, 1957
- Studio: Van Gelder Studio, Hackensack, New Jersey
- Genre: Jazz
- Length: 35:58
- Label: Status; ST 8304
- Producer: Bob Weinstock

Phil Woods chronology
Four Altos (1957)	Sugan (1965)	Bird Feathers (1957)

Red Garland chronology
Red Garland Revisited! (1957)	Sugan (1957)	The P.C. Blues (1957)

Sugan is an album by saxophonist Phil Woods with pianist Red Garland recorded in 1957 and originally released on the Status label, a subsidiary of Prestige Records.

== Reception ==
Professional ratings
Review scores
Source	Rating
Allmusic	4/5 stars
The Penguin Guide to Jazz Recordings	3/4 stars

In his review for Allmusic, Scott Yanow stated: "essentially a bebop jam session... This little-known date is quite enjoyable".

== Track listing ==
All compositions by Phil Woods, except as indicated.

1. "Au Privave" (Charlie Parker) - 6:56
2. "Steeplechase" (Parker) - 7:27
3. "Last Fling" - 6:33
4. "Sugan" - 9:25
5. "Green Pines" - 5:02
6. "Scrapple from the Apple" (Parker) - 7:38

== Personnel ==
- Phil Woods - alto saxophone
- Ray Copeland - trumpet
- Red Garland - piano
- Teddy Kotick - bass
- Nick Stabulas - drums
