= Soultrane =

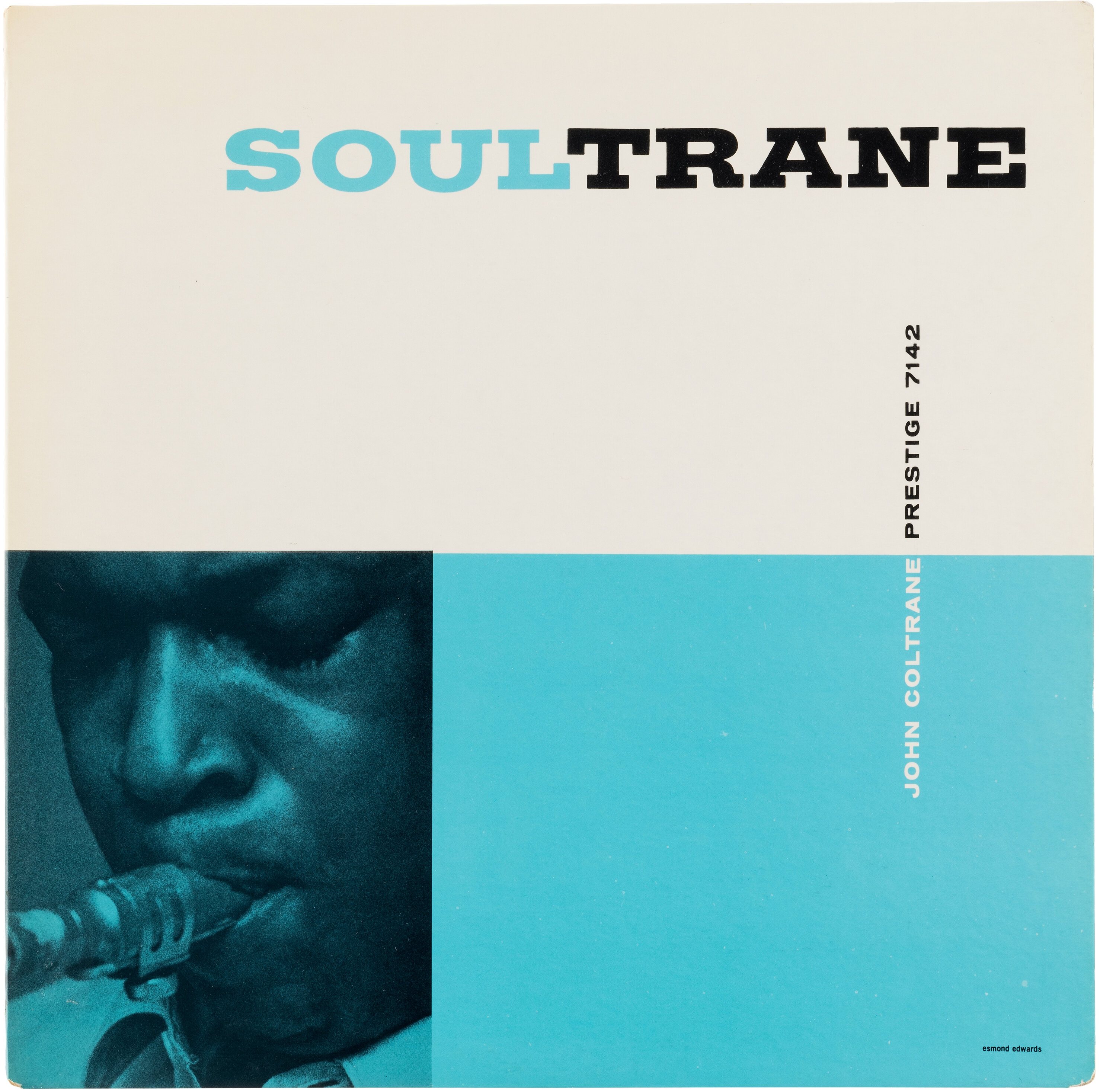

Studio album by John Coltrane
- Released: October 1958
- Recorded: February 7, 1958
- Studios: Van Gelder, Hackensack, New Jersey
- Genres: Jazz; hard bop
- Length: 39:56
- Label: Prestige
- Producer: Bob Weinstock

John Coltrane chronology
John Coltrane with the Red Garland Trio (1958)	Soultrane (1958)	Giant Steps (1960)

Professional ratings
Review scores
Source	Rating
AllMusic	4/5 stars
The Encyclopedia of Popular Music	4/5 stars
Tom Hull	A−
The Penguin Guide to Jazz	3.5/4 stars
The Rolling Stone Jazz Record Guide	5/5 stars

Soultrane is a studio album by the jazz musician John Coltrane. It was released in 1958 through Prestige Records, with catalogue no. 7142. It was recorded in mono at the studio of Rudy Van Gelder in Hackensack, New Jersey, three days after a Columbia Records session for Miles Davis and the Milestones album.

== Content ==
The album is a showcase for Coltrane's late-1950s "sheets of sound" style, the term itself coined by critic Ira Gitler in the album's liner notes. Also featured is a long reading of Billy Eckstine's ballad standard "I Want to Talk About You", which Coltrane would revisit often, including a version on the album Live at Birdland. Among the other tracks are "Good Bait" by Tadd Dameron, and Fred Lacey's "Theme for Ernie". "You Say You Care" is from the Broadway production of Gentlemen Prefer Blondes.

The album closes with a frenetic version of Irving Berlin's "Russian Lullaby". Producer Bob Weinstock relates Coltrane's humorous interpretation:

We were doing a session and we were hung for a tune and I said, "Trane, why don't you think up some old standard?" He said, "OK I got it.["]...and they played "Russian Lullaby" at a real fast tempo. At the end I asked, "Trane, what was the name of that tune?" And he said, "Rushin' Lullaby". I cracked up.

Soultrane takes its title from a song on a 1956 album by Tadd Dameron featuring Coltrane, Mating Call. "Soultrane" does not appear on this Soultrane, and none of the five tunes on Soultrane is an original by Coltrane. The song "Theme for Ernie" was featured on the soundtrack for the 2005 film Hollywoodland.

== Track listing ==
Side one
No.	Title	Writer(s)	Length
1.	"Good Bait"	Tadd Dameron; Count Basie	12:08
2.	"I Want to Talk about You"	Billy Eckstine	10:53
Total length:			23:01

Side two
No.	Title	Writer(s)	Length
1.	"You Say You Care"	Leo Robin; Jule Styne	6:16
2.	"Theme for Ernie"	Fred Lacey	4:57
3.	"Russian Lullaby"	Irving Berlin	5:33
Total length:			16:46

== Personnel ==
- John Coltrane – tenor saxophone
- Red Garland – piano
- Paul Chambers – bass
- Art Taylor – drums

=== Production ===
- Rudy Van Gelder – engineering, remastering
- Shigeo Miyamoto – engineering, mastering
- Alan Yoshida, Steve Hoffman – mastering
- Del Costello, Bob Weinstock – production
- Kazue Sugimoto – supervision
- Akira Taguchi – supervision
- Ira Gitler – liner notes
