= Fontainebleau (album) =

Studio album by Tadd Dameron
- Released: 1956
- Recorded: March 9, 1956, Van Gelder Studio, Hackensack, New Jersey
- Genre: Jazz
- Length: 30:58
- Label: Prestige

Tadd Dameron chronology
A Study in Dameronia (1956)	Fontainebleau (1956)	Mating Call (1956)

Fontainebleau is a 1956 album by jazz musician Tadd Dameron. The title track, inspired by a trip to the French palace of the same name, is a through-composed composition with no solos, while "Flossie Lou" is a contrafact of "Jeepers Creepers".

== Reception ==
Professional ratings
Review scores
Source	Rating
AllMusic	4.5/5 stars
Disc	4.5/5 stars
MusicHound Jazz	4.5/5 stars
The Penguin Guide to Jazz Recordings	3.5/4 stars
The Rolling Stone Jazz Record Guide	4/5 stars
The Virgin Encyclopedia of Jazz	4/5 stars

In a review for AllMusic, Scott Yanow wrote: "As is usual with most Dameron dates, the emphasis is on his inventive arrangements although there is space... for individual solos. Recommended."

Marc Myers of JazzWax called Fontainebleau "one of the prettiest octet albums of the 1950s," and commented: "The players on the album come together well, as if carefully selected for their tones... For me, the album is as perfect as a panoramic landscape painting... The music is delicate and cohesive, and the solos celebrate the vistas that dazzle the eye."

== Track listing ==
All tracks composed by Tadd Dameron.

1. "Fontainebleau" – 4:48
2. "Delirium" – 5:00
3. "The Scene Is Clean" – 5:00
4. "Flossie Lou" – 4:50
5. "Bula-Beige" – 11:20

Recorded March 9, 1956, at Van Gelder Studio, Hackensack, New Jersey.

== Personnel ==
- Kenny Dorham – trumpet
- Henry Coker – trombone
- Cecil Payne - baritone saxophone
- Sahib Shihab – alto saxophone
- Joe Alexander – tenor saxophone
- Tadd Dameron – piano
- John Simmons – bass
- Shadow Wilson – drums
