= Brazilia (album) =

Live album by John Coltrane
- Released: 1978
- Recorded: May 7, 1965
- Venues: Half Note Club, New York City
- Genre: Hard bop
- Label: Blue Parrot

Brazilia is a live album by jazz musician John Coltrane. It was recorded at the Half Note Club in New York City on May 7, 1965, and was released in 1978 by Blue Parrot Records. On the album, Coltrane is accompanied by the members of his "classic quartet": pianist McCoy Tyner, bassist Jimmy Garrison, and drummer Elvin Jones.

According to the authors of The John Coltrane Reference, the track titled "Brazilia" is actually "Song of Praise." Both tracks were also released on the second disc of the 2005 album Live at the Half Note: One Down, One Up.

== Track listing ==
Original LP release Brazilia (Blue Parrot).

1. "Brazilia" (John Coltrane) – 19:20
2. "My Favorite Things" (Richard Rodgers) – 21:30

== Personnel ==
Recorded May 7, 1965 in New York City.

- John Coltrane — tenor saxophone/soprano saxophone
- McCoy Tyner — piano
- Jimmy Garrison — double bass
- Elvin Jones — drums
