= Ballads (John Coltrane album) =

1963 studio album by John Coltrane

Studio album by John Coltrane
- Released: January 1963
- Recorded: December 21, 1961; September 18 and November 13, 1962
- Studio: Van Gelder (Englewood Cliffs)
- Genre: Jazz
- Length: 32:15 (Original LP); 80:56 (2002 CD reissue)
- Labels: Impulse! A-32
- Producer: Bob Thiele

John Coltrane chronology
Duke Ellington & John Coltrane (1963)	Ballads (1963)	Kenny Burrell & John Coltrane (1963)

Professional ratings
Review scores
Source	Rating
AllMusic	4/5 stars
DownBeat (Original Lp release)	2/5 stars
The Encyclopedia of Popular Music	4/5 stars
New Record Mirror	3/5 stars
The Penguin Guide to Jazz	3.5/4 stars
The Rolling Stone Jazz Record Guide	3/5 stars

Ballads is a jazz album by American saxophonist John Coltrane released in January 1963 by Impulse! Records. It was recorded in December 1961 and 1962, and released with catalogue number A-32 (mono) and AS-32 (stereo). Critic Gene Lees stated that the quartet had never played the tunes before. "They arrived with music-store sheet music of the songs" and just before the recordings, they "would discuss each tune, write out copies of the changes they'd use, semi-rehearse for a half hour and then do it". Each piece was recorded in one take, except for "All or Nothing at All".

In 2008, the album was a recipient of the Grammy Hall of Fame award.

== Track listing ==
=== Original LP ===
Side one
No.	Title	Writer(s)	Length
1.	"Say It (Over and Over Again)"	Jimmy McHugh	4:18
2.	"You Don't Know What Love Is"	Gene DePaul	5:15
3.	"Too Young to Go Steady"	Jimmy McHugh	4:23
4.	"All or Nothing at All"	Arthur Altman	3:39
Total length:			17:35

Side two
No.	Title	Writer(s)	Length
1.	"I Wish I Knew"	Harry Warren	4:54
2.	"What's New?"	Bob Haggart	3:47
3.	"It's Easy to Remember"	Richard Rodgers	2:49
4.	"Nancy (With the Laughing Face)"	Jimmy Van Heusen	3:10
Total length:			14:40 32:15

=== 2002 CD Deluxe edition ===
Disc two
No.	Title	Length
1.	"They Say It's Wonderful"	3:03
2.	"All or Nothing at All" (Alternate take)	3:42
3.	"Greensleeves" (Alternate take)	4:27
4.	"Greensleeves" (Alternate take)	3:47
5.	"Greensleeves" (Alternate take)	3:44
6.	"Greensleeves" (Master take)	3:37
7.	"Greensleeves" (Alternate take)	4:18
8.	"It's Easy to Remember" (Alternate take)	4:40
9.	"It's Easy to Remember" (Alternate take)	2:45
10.	"It's Easy to Remember" (Alternate take)	2:47
11.	"It's Easy to Remember" (Alternate take)	2:46
12.	"It's Easy to Remember" (Alternate take)	3:45
13.	"It's Easy to Remember" (Alternate take)	2:38
14.	"It's Easy to Remember" (Alternate take)	2:42
Total length:		48:41 80:56

== Personnel ==
- John Coltrane – tenor saxophone
- McCoy Tyner – piano
- Jimmy Garrison (#1–6, 8), Reggie Workman (#7; Disc 2, #3–14) – bass
- Elvin Jones – drums

== Production ==
- Rudy Van Gelder – recording engineer
- Jim Marshall – photography
