= Impressions (John Coltrane album) =

1963 studio album / live album by John Coltrane

Studio album / Live album by John Coltrane
- Released: July 1963
- Recorded: November 3, 1961; September 18, 1962 and April 29, 1963
- Venues: Village Vanguard, New York
- Studio: Van Gelder (Englewood Cliffs)
- Genres: Avant-garde jazz; post-bop; modal jazz
- Length: 36:40
- Label: Impulse!
- Producer: Bob Thiele

John Coltrane chronology
Kenny Burrell & John Coltrane (1963)	Impressions (1963)	Stardust (1963)

Professional ratings
Review scores
Source	Rating
AllMusic	4/5 stars
Down Beat (Original LP release)	5/5 stars
Down Beat (Reissue)	4/5 stars
The Rolling Stone Jazz Record Guide	5/5 stars
Encyclopedia of Popular Music	4/5 stars
The Penguin Guide to Jazz Recordings	3.5/4 stars

Impressions is an album of live and studio recordings by the American jazz saxophonist and composer John Coltrane. It was released through Impulse! Records in July 1963.

== Music and recording ==
Tracks 1 and 3 were recorded live at the Village Vanguard in Greenwich Village, Manhattan, in November 1961, during the same residency that produced "Live" at the Village Vanguard. Tracks 2 and 4 were recorded at Van Gelder Studio, respectively on September 18, 1962 and April 29, 1963. The CD reissue bonus track "Dear Old Stockholm" was also recorded at the April 1963 session.

The studio tracks were performed by the classic Coltrane quartet (pianist McCoy Tyner, bassist Jimmy Garrison, and drummer Elvin Jones), who are joined by multireedist Eric Dolphy and bassist Reggie Workman on the live tracks. Dolphy contributes a long bass clarinet solo on "India", but lays out on all but the final chord of "Impressions". Workman plays only on "India", joining Garrison in approximating the droning sound of Hindustani classical music. Drummer Roy Haynes replaces Jones on "After the Rain" and "Dear Old Stockholm".

== Reception ==
DownBeat magazine critic Harvey Pekar summed up the album in his five-star review of August 29, 1963: "Not all the music on this album is excellent (which is what a five-star rating signifies,) but some is more than excellent."

== Influence on popular music ==
According to Roger McGuinn, while touring in late 1965, the Byrds had only a single tape recording to listen to on the tour bus, with a Ravi Shankar recording on one side and Coltrane's Impressions and Africa/Brass on the other: "We played that damn thing 50 or 100 times, through a Fender amplifier that was plugged into an alternator in the car." The band's 1966 single "Eight Miles High" was a direct homage to Coltrane, and to "India" on Impressions in particular.

In 2000 it was voted number 687 in Colin Larkin's All Time Top 1000 Albums.

== Track listing ==
All tracks composed by John Coltrane except where noted.

Side 1
No.	Title	Recording date and location	Length
1.	"India"	November 3, 1961, Village Vanguard	14:10
2.	"Up 'Gainst the Wall"	September 18, 1962, Van Gelder Studio	3:17

Side 2
No.	Title	Recording date and location	Length
3.	"Impressions"	November 3, 1961, Village Vanguard	15:06
4.	"After the Rain"	April 29, 1963, Van Gelder Studio	4:07

CD reissue bonus track
No.	Title	Recording date and location	Length
5.	"Dear Old Stockholm" (Stan Getz, Traditional)	April 29, 1963, Van Gelder Studio	10:38

== Personnel ==
Musicians

- John Coltrane – soprano and tenor saxophones
- Jimmy Garrison – double bass
- McCoy Tyner – piano
- Elvin Jones – drums (tracks 1–3)
- Eric Dolphy – bass clarinet (track 1), alto saxophone (track 3)
- Reggie Workman – double bass (track 1)
- Roy Haynes – drums (tracks 4–5)

Production

- Bob Thiele – producer
- Rudy Van Gelder – recording engineer
- Kevin Reeves – reissue mastering

== Charts ==
Chart performance for Impressions
Chart (2014–2026)	Peak position
UK Jazz & Blues Albums (Official Charts)	20
