= Wheelin' & Dealin' (Prestige Records album) =

1958 jazz studio album

Studio album by Frank Wess, John Coltrane, Paul Quinichette, Mal Waldron, Doug Watkins and Art Taylor
- Released: April 1958
- Recorded: September 20, 1957
- Studio: Van Gelder Studio, Hackensack, New Jersey
- Genre: Jazz
- Length: 45:38 (original LP)
- Label: Prestige; PRLP 7131
- Producer: Bob Weinstock

Professional ratings
Review scores
Source	Rating
Allmusic	3/5 stars
The Penguin Guide to Jazz	2.5/4 stars
The Rolling Stone Jazz Record Guide	3/5 stars

Wheelin' & Dealin' is an album by Frank Wess, John Coltrane, Paul Quinichette, Mal Waldron, Doug Watkins and Art Taylor released in April 1958 by Prestige Records. It was later reissued on New Jazz Records in 1964. On a small number of reissues, it is credited to "The Prestige All Stars", a name used by Prestige for various combinations of musicians who were under contract to the label. The compact disc reissue adds two alternate takes that did not appear on the initial vinyl releases.

== Track listing ==
All tracks composed by Mal Waldron, except where noted.

1. "Things Ain't What They Used to Be" (Mercer Ellington, Ted Persons) – 8:27
2. "Wheelin'" (Take 2) – 11:22
3. "Wheelin'" (Take 1) – 10:25 Bonus track on CD reissue
4. "Robbins' Nest" (Illinois Jacquet, Bob Russell, Sir Charles Thompson) – 15:33
5. "Dealin'" (Take 2) – 10:16
6. "Dealin'" (Take 1) – 9:59 Bonus track on CD reissue

== Personnel ==
- John Coltrane – tenor saxophone
- Paul Quinichette – tenor saxophone
- Frank Wess – tenor saxophone, flute
- Mal Waldron – piano
- Doug Watkins – bass
- Art Taylor – drums
