= High Pressure (album) =

Studio album by The Red Garland Quintet with John Coltrane
- Released: End of November/early December 1961
- Recorded: November 15 & December 13, 1957; Van Gelder Studio, Hackensack, NJ
- Genre: Jazz
- Length: 43:58
- Label: Prestige; PRLP 7209
- Producer: Bob Weinstock

Red Garland chronology
Soul Junction (1960)	High Pressure (1961)	Dig It! (1962)

Professional ratings
Review scores
Source	Rating
AllMusic	3/5 stars
The Penguin Guide to Jazz Recordings	3.5/4 stars

High Pressure is an album by the jazz pianist Red Garland, recorded in 1957 but not released until 1961 on Prestige Records.

== Track listing ==
1. "Soft Winds" (Benny Goodman, Fletcher Henderson) – 13:47
2. "Solitude" (Duke Ellington, Eddie DeLange, Irving Mills) – 8:33
3. "Undecided" (Sid Robin, Charlie Shavers) – 6:52
4. "What Is There to Say?" (Vernon Duke, Yip Harburg) – 5:58
5. "Two Bass Hit" (Dizzy Gillespie, John Lewis) – 8:48

Recorded on November 15 (#3–4) and December 13 (#1–2, 5), 1957.

== Personnel ==
- Red Garland – piano
- John Coltrane – tenor sax
- Donald Byrd – trumpet
- George Joyner – double bass
- Art Taylor – drums
