= Lush Life (John Coltrane album) =

Studio album by John Coltrane
- Released: February or March 1961
- Recorded: May 31, 1957; August 16, 1957; January 10, 1958
- Studios: Van Gelder Studio; Hackensack, New Jersey
- Genre: Jazz
- Length: 36:39
- Labels: Prestige; PRLP 7188
- Producer: Bob Weinstock

John Coltrane chronology
Coltrane Jazz (1961)	Lush Life (1961)	My Favorite Things (1961)

Lush Life is a studio album by the jazz musician John Coltrane. It was released in early 1961 through Prestige Records. It was assembled from previously unissued tracks from three recording sessions at Van Gelder Studio in Hackensack, New Jersey in 1957 and 1958. As Coltrane's profile increased during the 1960s, some years after the end of his Prestige contract, the label used unissued recordings to create new albums without Coltrane's input or approval.

== Reception ==
Professional ratings
Review scores
Source	Rating
The Absolute Sound	4/5 stars
AllMusic	4/5 stars
DownBeat	5/5 stars
The Penguin Guide to Jazz	3/4 stars
The Rolling Stone Jazz Record Guide	5/5 stars

In a review for AllMusic, Lindsay Planer called the album "among John Coltrane's best endeavors on the Prestige label," and praised the title track, stating that "it is rightfully considered as one of Coltrane's unqualified masterworks," and commenting: "Coltrane handles the tune's delicate complexities with infinite style and finesse. Garland similarly sparkles at the 88s, while Byrd's solo offers a bit of a tonal alternative."

DownBeat's Dave Cantor also singled out the title track for praise, stating that it "punctuates the bandleader's ability to transcend time and place," with Coltrane "display[ing] an ability to synthesize the tune's lyrical content while still personalizing its message."

Regarding the trio tracks, the authors of The Penguin Guide to Jazz Recordings noted that bassist Earl May "is too anonymous a player to go the extra yard required for this exacting discipline," and warned that "there are unexpected inconsistencies of register and articulation in Coltrane's own performances."

David Rickert of All About Jazz stated that the album "is as good a place as any to start exploring the early days of Trane," and commented: "the record documents Coltrane's rapid growth over a short period of time while also showcasing how great a talent Coltrane was, even at this early stage."

In an article for The Absolute Sound, Wayne Garcia described the album as "consistently fabulous," and remarked: "The sound is exceptionally detailed, present, and airy, with gorgeously rich instrumental tones and textures, excellent dynamic scaling, and a notable lack of groove noise that brings these performances to goose bump-raising life."

Flophouse Magazine's François van de Linde wrote: "Prestige didn't have the decency to consult Coltrane in the matters of organising a record release. However, as both a longtime Coltrane fan and vinyl freak, I'm glad those 'crumbs' of Coltrane saw the light of day in 1961."

Matt Fripp of JazzFuel stated that the album "documents a pivotal point in [Coltrane's] development," and commented: "Whilst it may have been an exercise in money-making from the label... it is still a highly valuable and exciting insight into the career of a jazz great... an essential addition to any Coltrane collection."

== Track listing ==
Side one
No.	Title	Writer(s)	Date recorded	Length
1.	"Like Someone in Love"	Jimmy Van Heusen	August 16, 1957	5:00
2.	"I Love You"	Cole Porter	August 16, 1957	5:33
3.	"Trane's Slow Blues"	John Coltrane	August 16, 1957	6:05
Total length:				16:38

Side two
No.	Title	Writer(s)	Date recorded	Length
1.	"Lush Life"	Billy Strayhorn	January 10, 1958	14:00
2.	"I Hear a Rhapsody"	Jack Baker; George Fragos; Dick Gasparre	May 31, 1957	6:01
Total length:				20:01 36:39

== Personnel ==
=== May 31, 1957 ("I Hear a Rhapsody") ===
- John Coltrane – tenor saxophone
- Red Garland – piano
- Paul Chambers – bass
- Albert Heath – drums

=== August 16, 1957 (Side one) ===
- John Coltrane – tenor saxophone
- Earl May – bass
- Art Taylor – drums

=== January 10, 1958 ("Lush Life") ===
- John Coltrane – tenor saxophone
- Donald Byrd – trumpet
- Red Garland – piano
- Paul Chambers – bass
- Louis Hayes – drums

== See also ==
- John Coltrane and Johnny Hartman (1963) includes a version of the Strayhorn song 'Lush Life' with Johnny Hartman's vocal.
