= Stardust (John Coltrane album) =

Studio album by John Coltrane
- Released: July 1963
- Recorded: July 11, 1958 (#1, 3); December 26, 1958 (#2, 4)
- Studio: Van Gelder (Hackensack)
- Genres: Jazz; hard bop
- Length: 37:17
- Label: Prestige
- Producer: Bob Weinstock

John Coltrane chronology
Impressions (1963)	Stardust (1963)	John Coltrane and Johnny Hartman (1963)

Stardust is an album by the jazz saxophonist and composer John Coltrane. It was released in July 1963 through Prestige Records. It was assembled from two separate 1958 recording sessions at Rudy Van Gelder's studio in Hackensack, New Jersey.

== Reception ==
Professional ratings
Review scores
Source	Rating
The Rolling Stone Jazz Record Guide	3/5 stars
The Penguin Guide to Jazz Recordings	3/4 stars
AllMusic	3/5 stars

AllMusic reviewer Alex Henderson wrote:

Stardust contains some highlights of two bop-oriented Coltrane dates from 1958. ... At both sessions, Coltrane's playing is quite engaging. He is a lyrical, expressive ballad player on Then I'll Be Tired of You, Stardust, and Time After Time, but he swings fast and aggressively on Love Thy Neighbor. ... Coltrane is well served by Garland's piano and Chambers' bass. ... Although not quite essential, Stardust paints a consistently attractive picture of Coltrane's 1958 output.

== Track listing ==
No.	Title	Writer(s)	Length
1.	"Stardust"	Hoagy Carmichael; Mitchell Parish	10:44
2.	"Time After Time"	Sammy Cahn; Jule Styne	7:45
3.	"Love Thy Neighbor"	Mack Gordon; Harry Revel	9:21
4.	"Then I'll Be Tired of You"	Yip Harburg; Arthur Schwartz	9:27
Total length:			37:17

== Personnel ==
- John Coltrane – tenor saxophone
- Wilbur Harden – flugelhorn (track 1), trumpet (3)
- Freddie Hubbard – trumpet (4)
- Red Garland – piano
- Paul Chambers – bass
- Jimmy Cobb – drums (1, 3)
- Arthur Taylor – drums (2, 4)
