= Blue Train (album) =

1958 jazz album by John Coltrane

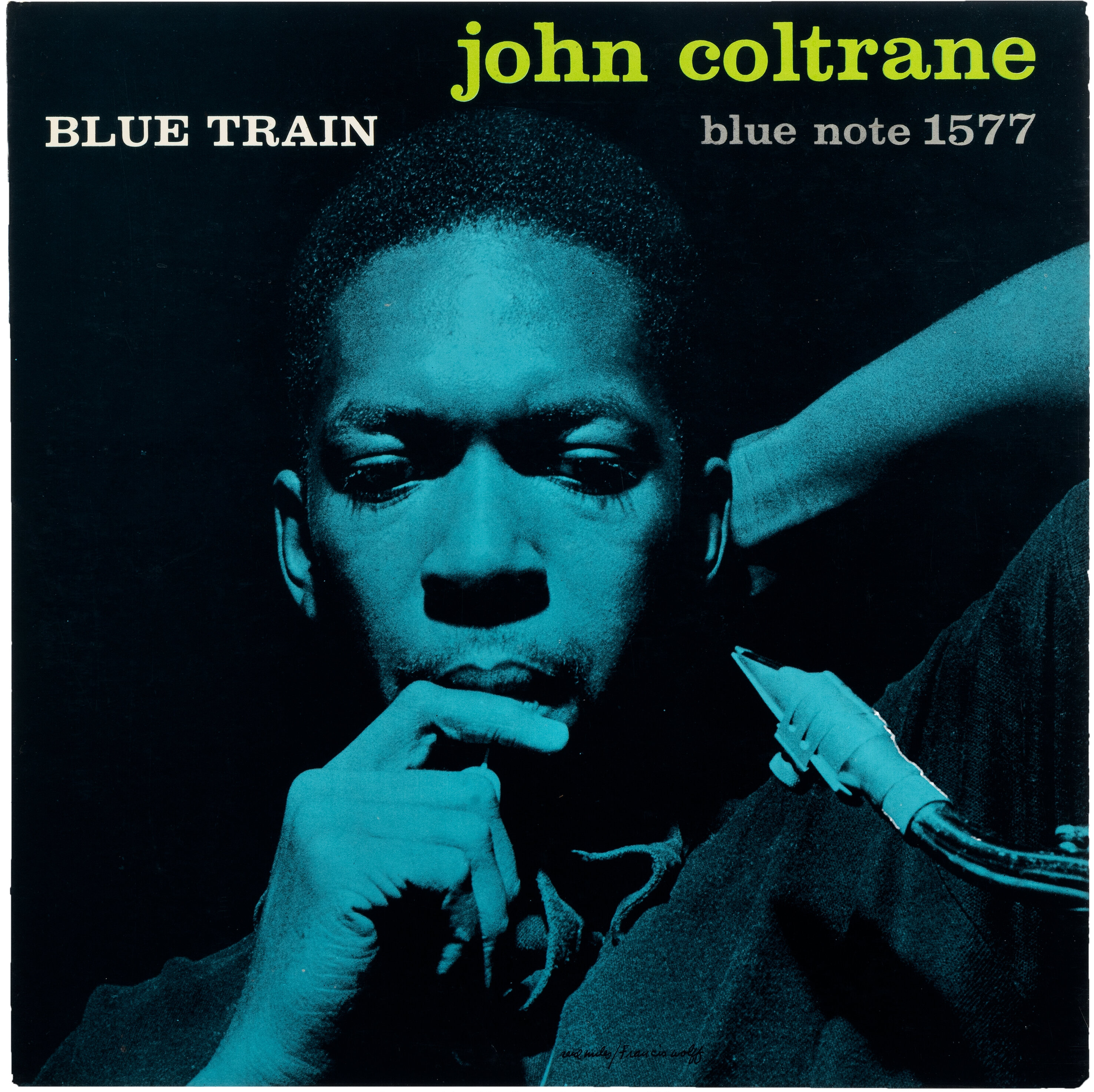

Studio album by John Coltrane
- Released: January 1958
- Recorded: September 15, 1957
- Studio: Van Gelder (Hackensack, New Jersey)
- Genre: Hard bop
- Length: 42:05
- Label: Blue Note
- Producer: Alfred Lion

John Coltrane chronology
Coltrane (1957)	Blue Train (1958)	John Coltrane with the Red Garland Trio (1958)

Blue Train is a studio album by the jazz saxophonist and composer John Coltrane. It was released in January 1958 through Blue Note Records, and is Coltrane's only session as leader for the label. The recording was engineered by Rudy Van Gelder and took place at his studio in Hackensack, New Jersey, on September 15, 1957.

Coltrane wrote four of the record's five tracks. His playing exhibits early elements of the signature style for which he later became known. The album attained a gold sales certification from the Recording Industry Association of America in 2001.

== Background ==
The album was recorded in the midst of Coltrane's residency at the Five Spot as a member of the Thelonious Monk quartet. The personnel includes Coltrane's Miles Davis bandmates Paul Chambers (bass) and Philly Joe Jones (drums), both of whom had worked before with pianist Kenny Drew. Both trumpeter Lee Morgan and trombonist Curtis Fuller were up-and-coming jazz musicians. Unlike Coltrane's previous label, Blue Note paid the musicians to rehearse the music before the recording session.

=== Composition ===
Four of the five compositions were written by Coltrane, the exception being the standard "I'm Old Fashioned". Though at this point his compositions used conventional diatonic harmonies, they were set in unconventional ways. The title track is a bluesy piece with a quasi-minor (E♭7#9) theme. "Locomotion" is also a blues riff tune, in forty-four-bar form. There is a harmonic relationship between Coltrane's "Lazy Bird" and the Tadd Dameron composition "Lady Bird".

=== Style ===
Coltrane's playing exhibits the move toward what would become his signature style. His solos are more harmonic or "vertical" and lines arpeggiated. His timing was often apart from or over the beat, rather than playing on or behind it. During a 1960 interview, Coltrane described Blue Train as his favorite album of his own up to that point.

John Coltrane's next major album, Giant Steps, broke new melodic and harmonic ground in jazz, whereas Blue Train adheres to the hard bop style of the era.

While on Joe Vella's podcast "Traneumentary", Michael Cuscuna, the reissue producer at Blue Note, commented:

We’re listening to Blue Train, which to me is one of the most beautiful pieces on one of the most beautiful records that Coltrane recorded in the fifties. It’s his first real mature statement and he wrote all but one of the tunes on this album which was very rare in the fifties and each one is a gem, particularly the title tune Blue Train. And while it’s kind of easy to play the blues, this has a suspended and haunting kind of quality to it.

=== Reissues and certification ===
It had sold more than half a million copies by April 2001 and thus was certified with a gold sales certification by the Recording Industry Association of America the following year.

In 1997, The Ultimate Blue Train was released, adding two alternate takes and enhanced content, and in 1999 a 24bit 192 kHz DVD-Audio version was issued. In 2003, both a Super Audio Compact Disc version was released, as well as a remastered compact disc as part of Blue Note's Rudy Van Gelder series.

In 2015, Blue Note/Universal released a Blu-ray audio edition of the album with four bonus tracks, one of which is a previously unreleased take of "Lazy Bird". Alternate takes of "Moment's Notice" were released on Blue Train: The Complete Masters, in 2022.

== Reception ==
Professional ratings
Review scores
Source	Rating
AllMusic	5/5 stars
The Encyclopedia of Popular Music	5/5 stars
Tom Hull	A−
The Penguin Guide to Jazz	4/4 stars
The Rolling Stone Jazz Record Guide	5/5 stars

In 2000 it was voted number 339 in Colin Larkin's All Time Top 1000 Albums. He stated, "Coltrane may have made more important albums, but none swung as effectively as this one."

== Track listing ==
All tracks written by John Coltrane except where noted.

Side 1
No.	Title	Length
1.	"Blue Train"	10:43
2.	"Moment's Notice"	9:10
Total length:		19:53

Side 2
No.	Title	Writer(s)	Length
1.	"Locomotion"		7:14
2.	"I'm Old Fashioned"	Johnny Mercer, Jerome Kern	7:58
3.	"Lazy Bird"		7:00
Total length:			22:12 42:05

== Personnel ==
=== Musicians ===
- John Coltrane – tenor saxophone
- Lee Morgan – trumpet
- Curtis Fuller – trombone
- Kenny Drew – piano
- Paul Chambers – double bass
- Philly Joe Jones – drums

=== Technical personnel ===
- Alfred Lion – producer
- Rudy Van Gelder – recording engineer, mastering
- Reid Miles – design
- Francis Wolff – photography
- Robert Levin – liner notes

== Charts ==
Chart performance for Blue Train: Complete Masters
Chart (2022)	Peak position
Austrian Albums (Ö3 Austria)	31
Belgian Albums (Ultratop Flanders)	17
Belgian Albums (Ultratop Wallonia)	75
Dutch Albums (Album Top 100)	39
German Albums (Offizielle Top 100)	12
Japanese Albums (Oricon)	43
Japanese Hot Albums (Billboard Japan)	62
Scottish Albums (Official Charts)	23
Swiss Albums (Schweizer Hitparade)	21
US Billboard 200	95
US Top Jazz Albums (Billboard)	1

Chart (2026)	Peak position
Croatian International Albums (HDU)	25

== Certifications ==
Certifications for Blue Train
Region	Certification	Certified units/sales
Canada (Music Canada)	Gold	50,000^{^}
Italy (FIMI)	Platinum	50,000^{‡}
United Kingdom (BPI)	Gold	100,000^{^}
United States (RIAA)	Gold	500,000^{^}
^{^} Shipments figures based on certification alone.^{‡} Sales+streaming figures based on certification alone.
