= Dig It! =

Studio album by The Red Garland Quintet with John Coltrane
- Released: Mid August 1962
- Recorded: March 22, 1957; December 13, 1957; February 2, 1958
- Studio: Van Gelder Studio, Hackensack, New Jersey
- Genre: Jazz
- Length: 33:40
- Label: Prestige; PRLP 7229
- Producer: Bob Weinstock

Red Garland chronology
High Pressure (1961)	Dig It! (1962)	It's a Blue World (1970)

Professional ratings
Review scores
Source	Rating
DownBeat	5/5 stars
AllMusic	link
The Penguin Guide to Jazz Recordings	2.5/4 stars

Dig It! is a jazz album by The Red Garland Quintet, recorded in 1957 and 1958 but not released on the Prestige label as PRLP 7229 until 1962.

== Reception ==
Harvey Pekar wrote in the December 6, 1962 issue of DownBeat magazine: "This Lp is another in the series of excellent informal sessions Garland and Coltrane made for Prestige in the late '50s."

== Track listing ==
1. "Billie's Bounce" (Charlie Parker) – 9:24
2. "Crazy Rhythm" (Irving Caesar, Joseph Meyer, Roger Wolfe Kahn) – 3:26
3. "CTA" (Jimmy Heath) – 4:42 also already issued on Taylor's Wailers
4. "Lazy Mae" (Garland) – 16:06

== Personnel ==
- Red Garland – piano
- John Coltrane – tenor saxophone (tracks 1, 3, 4)
- Donald Byrd – trumpet (1, 4)
- Jamil Nasser – bass (1, 3, 4)
- Paul Chambers – bass (2)
- Art Taylor – drums
