= The Last Trane =

Studio album by John Coltrane
- Released: January 1966
- Recorded: August 16, 1957 (2); January 10, 1958 (1, 4); March 26, 1958 (3)
- Studios: Van Gelder Studio, Hackensack
- Genre: Jazz
- Length: 34:56
- Labels: Prestige; PRLP 7378
- Producer: Bob Weinstock

John Coltrane chronology
The John Coltrane Quartet Plays (1965)	The Last Trane (1966)	Ascension (1966)

Professional ratings
Review scores
Source	Rating
Allmusic	3/5 stars
DownBeat	4/5 stars
The Penguin Guide to Jazz	3/4 stars
The Rolling Stone Jazz Record Guide	3/5 stars

The Last Trane is an album credited to jazz musician John Coltrane, released in 1966 on Prestige Records, catalogue 7378.

It was assembled from unissued material from three separate recording sessions at the studio of Rudy Van Gelder in Hackensack, New Jersey in 1957 and 1958. Coltrane was a sideman on all the original sessions, which were led by trumpeter Donald Byrd, pianist Red Garland or drummer Art Taylor.

== Track listing ==
No.	Title	Writer(s)	Length
1.	"Lover"	Lorenz Hart, Richard Rodgers	8:00
2.	"Slowtrane"	Coltrane	7:16
3.	"By the Numbers"	Coltrane	11:00
4.	"Come Rain or Come Shine"	Harold Arlen, Johnny Mercer	8:40
Total length:			34:56

== Personnel ==
- John Coltrane – tenor saxophone
- Donald Byrd – trumpet (tracks 1,4)
- Red Garland – piano (tracks 1,3,4)
- Paul Chambers – bass (tracks 1,3,4)
- Earl May – bass (track 2)
- Louis Hayes – drums (tracks 1,4)
- Art Taylor – drums (tracks 2,3)
