= Kenny Burrell & John Coltrane =

Studio album by Kenny Burrell & John Coltrane
- Released: April 1963
- Recorded: March 7, 1958
- Studio: Van Gelder (Hackensack)
- Genre: Jazz
- Length: 37:20
- Labels: New Jazz; NJ 8276
- Producer: Bob Weinstock

John Coltrane chronology
Ballads (1963)	Kenny Burrell & John Coltrane (1963)	Impressions (1963)

Kenny Burrell chronology
Blue Lights (1958)	Kenny Burrell & John Coltrane (1962)	Blue Bash! (1963)

Alternative cover
- The Kenny Burrell Quintet With John Coltrane (PR 7532, 1968)

Kenny Burrell & John Coltrane is a studio album of music performed by jazz musicians Kenny Burrell and John Coltrane. It was released on the New Jazz label in April 1963. The recording was made on March 7, 1958. It was reissued in 1967 on New Jazz's parent label Prestige, with a different cover and retitled The Kenny Burrell Quintet With John Coltrane. The record was the second to feature Coltrane, Burrell, and Flanagan playing together in a small group. Eleven months earlier, the three recorded The Cats, which was first released in December 1959 on the New Jazz label.

== Reception ==
Professional ratings
Review scores
Source	Rating
AllMusic	4/5 stars
The Encyclopedia of Popular Music	4/5 stars
The Penguin Guide to Jazz Recordings	3/4 stars
The Rolling Stone Jazz Record Guide	3/5 stars

Lindsay Planer of AllMusic gave it 4 stars, stating: "While not one of Coltrane's most assured performances, he chases the groove right into the hands of Burrell. The guitarist spins sonic gold and seems to inspire similar contributions from Chambers' bowed bass and Coltrane alike."

== Track listing ==
No.	Title	Writer(s)	Length
1.	"Freight Trane"	Tommy Flanagan	7:18
2.	"I Never Knew"	Ted Fio Rito, Gus Kahn	7:04
3.	"Lyresto"	Kenny Burrell	5:41
4.	"Why Was I Born?"	Oscar Hammerstein II, Jerome Kern	3:12
5.	"Big Paul"	Tommy Flanagan	14:05
Total length:			37:20

== Personnel ==
- John Coltrane – tenor saxophone
- Kenny Burrell – guitar
- Tommy Flanagan – piano
- Paul Chambers – bass
- Jimmy Cobb – drums
