= Soul Junction =

Studio album by The Red Garland Quintet
- Released: Late 1960
- Recorded: November 15, 1957
- Studio: Van Gelder Studio, Hackensack, New Jersey
- Genre: Jazz
- Length: 42:41
- Label: Prestige; PRLP 7181
- Producer: Bob Weinstock

Red Garland chronology
All Mornin' Long (1958)	Soul Junction (1960)	High Pressure (1961)

Professional ratings
Review scores
Source	Rating
Allmusic	4/5 stars
The Penguin Guide to Jazz Recordings	3.5/4 stars

Soul Junction is an album by the jazz pianist and composer Red Garland. It was released in 1960 through Prestige Records. It features tracks recorded on November 15, 1957, the same day the pieces for All Mornin' Long were recorded, with the same lineup.

== Track listing ==
1. "Soul Junction" (Garland) – 15:30
2. "Woody 'n' You" (Dizzy Gillespie) – 6:50
3. "Birks' Works" (Dizzy Gillespie) – 7:35
4. "I've Got It Bad (And That Ain't Good)" (Duke Ellington, Paul Francis Webster) – 6:15
5. "Hallelujah" (Vincent Youmans) – 6:31

== Personnel ==
- Red Garland – piano
- John Coltrane – tenor sax
- Donald Byrd – trumpet
- George Joyner – bass
- Art Taylor – drums
