= Bahia (album) =

Studio album by John Coltrane
- Released: May 1965
- Recorded: July 11, 1958 (#3–4); December 26, 1958 (#1–2, 5)
- Studios: Van Gelder Studio, Hackensack, NJ
- Genres: Jazz, hard bop
- Length: 36:28
- Labels: Prestige; PRLP 7353
- Producer: Bob Weinstock

John Coltrane chronology
A Love Supreme (1965)	Bahia (1965)	The John Coltrane Quartet Plays (1965)

Bahia is an album by jazz musician John Coltrane, released in 1965 on Prestige Records, catalogue 7353. It was recorded at two sessions at the studio of Rudy Van Gelder in Hackensack, New Jersey in 1958. Prestige drew on a stockpile of Coltrane material for several years after his contract had ended without the saxophonist's input.

== Reception ==
Professional ratings
Review scores
Source	Rating
AllMusic	3/5 stars
Down Beat	4/5 stars
The Penguin Guide to Jazz	3/4 stars
Record Mirror	3/5 stars
The Rolling Stone Jazz Record Guide	3/5 stars

In a review for AllMusic, Ron Wynn called the album "a steady, often very good hard-blowing and blues date."

The authors of The Penguin Guide to Jazz Recordings wrote: "Harden's warm, unemphatic trumpet-playing is perfectly appropriate to the setting, and it rarely attempts anything that will scare the horses."

A reviewer for the Record Mirror commented: "Talk of Coltrane being 'anti-jazz' must be dispelled by this little lot."

Tremr's Charlie Wooley described Bahia as "an enjoyable listen," and stated that it "proves that Coltrane manages to be thoroughly entertaining, even at some of his weakest, most traditional moments. It reminds listeners once again that he excels at tackling a huge variety of styles."

== Track listing ==
=== Side 1 ===
No.	Title	Writer(s)	Length
1.	"Bahia"	Ary Barroso	6:19
2.	"Goldsboro Express"	Coltrane	4:41
3.	"My Ideal"	Richard Whiting and Newell Chase (music), Leo Robin (words)	7:30
Total length:			18:30

=== Side 2 ===
No.	Title	Writer(s)	Length
1.	"I'm a Dreamer, Aren't We All"	Ray Henderson (m), Buddy De Sylva and Lew Brown (w)	7:10
2.	"Something I Dreamed Last Night"	Sammy Fain (m), Jack Yellen and Herb Magidson (w)	10:48
Total length:			17:58 36:28

== Personnel ==
- John Coltrane – tenor saxophone
- Wilbur Harden – flugelhorn, trumpet (tracks 3, 4)
- Freddie Hubbard – trumpet (track 5)
- Red Garland – piano (tracks 1, 3–5)
- Paul Chambers – bass
- Art Taylor – drums (track 1–2,5)
- Jimmy Cobb – drums (tracks 3–4)
