= Tenor Conclave =

Studio album by John Coltrane, Hank Mobley, Al Cohn and Zoot Sims
- Released: February or March 1957
- Recorded: September 7, 1956; Van Gelder Studio, Hackensack
- Genre: Jazz
- Length: 43:59
- Label: Prestige; PRLP 7074/PRLP 7249
- Producer: Bob Weinstock

Alternative cover
- 1962 reissue (PRLP 7249)

Professional ratings
Review scores
Source	Rating
Allmusic	4/5 stars
Disc	4/5 stars

Tenor Conclave is a studio album by John Coltrane, Hank Mobley, Al Cohn, and Zoot Sims. It was recorded in 1956 and issued in early 1957 by Prestige Records.

Prestige re-released it in 1962 with a different cover more prominently displaying Coltrane's name. This reissue of the album was given the catalogue number PRLP 7249.

== Track listing ==
1. "Tenor Conclave" (Mobley) — 11:05
2. "Just You, Just Me" (Jesse Greer, Raymond Klages) — 9:29
3. "Bob's Boys" (Hank Mobley) — 8:26
4. "How Deep Is the Ocean" (Irving Berlin) — 15:04

== Personnel ==
- Al Cohn, John Coltrane, Hank Mobley, Zoot Sims — tenor saxophone
- Red Garland — piano
- Paul Chambers — bass
- Art Taylor — drums
