= John Coltrane with the Red Garland Trio =

Studio album by John Coltrane with the Red Garland Trio
- Released: February or March 1958
- Recorded: August 23, 1957
- Studios: Van Gelder Studio; Hackensack, New Jersey
- Genre: Jazz
- Length: 37:56
- Labels: Prestige; PRLP 7123; PRLP 7651 (Traneing In)
- Producer: Bob Weinstock

John Coltrane chronology
Blue Train (1958)	John Coltrane with the Red Garland Trio (1958)	Soultrane (1958)

Red Garland chronology
Sugan (1957)	John Coltrane with the Red Garland Trio (1958)	All Mornin' Long (1958)

Traneing In Cover

Professional ratings
Review scores
Source	Rating
AllMusic	4/5 stars
Encyclopedia of Popular Music	4/5 stars
The Penguin Guide to Jazz	3.5/4 stars

John Coltrane with the Red Garland Trio is the third studio album by the jazz musician John Coltrane. It was released in early 1958 through Prestige Records. The recording took place at Rudy Van Gelder's studio on August 23, 1957.

It was reissued in 1961 as Traneing In with a new catalogue number and cover design. The album was reissued on compact disc in 2007 as part of the Concord Music Group remastering series by original recording engineer Rudy Van Gelder.

== Track listing ==
All tracks are written by John Coltrane except as noted.

Side one
No.	Title	Writer(s)	Length
1.	"Traneing In"		12:34
2.	"Slow Dance"	Alonzo Levister	5:28
Total length:			18:02

Side two
No.	Title	Writer(s)	Length
1.	"Bass Blues"		7:48
2.	"You Leave Me Breathless"	Ralph Freed; Friedrich Hollaender	7:25
3.	"Soft Lights and Sweet Music"	Irving Berlin	4:41
Total length:			19:54 37:56

== Personnel ==
- John Coltrane – tenor saxophone
- Red Garland – piano
- Paul Chambers – bass
- Art Taylor – drums

== Charts ==
Chart performance
Chart (2026)	Peak position
Croatian International Albums (HDU)	24
