= Mating Call =

Studio album by Tadd Dameron
- Released: February or March 1957
- Recorded: November 30, 1956
- Genre: Jazz
- Length: 34:45
- Label: Prestige
- Producer: Bob Weinstock

Tadd Dameron chronology
Fontainebleau (1956)	Mating Call (1957)	The Magic Touch of Tadd Dameron (1962)

Professional ratings
Review scores
Source	Rating
AllMusic	4.5/5 stars
The Penguin Guide to Jazz Recordings	3/4 stars
The Rolling Stone Jazz Record Guide	4/5 stars

Mating Call is a studio album by the jazz musician Tadd Dameron with saxophonist John Coltrane, issued in early 1957 on Prestige Records. It was recorded at the studio of Rudy Van Gelder in Hackensack, New Jersey.

== Track listing ==
All compositions by Tadd Dameron.

1. "Mating Call" – 5:57
2. "Gnid" – 5:07
3. "Soultrane" – 5:24
4. "On a Misty Night" – 6:23
5. "Romas" – 7:45
6. "Super Jet" – 6:00

== Personnel ==
- Tadd Dameron – piano
- John Coltrane – tenor saxophone
- John Simmons – bass
- Philly Joe Jones – drums
