= Ira Gitler =

American jazz historian and journalist (1928–2019)

Ira Gitler (December 18, 1928 – February 23, 2019) was an American jazz historian and journalist. The co-author of The Biographical Encyclopedia of Jazz with Leonard Feather—the most recent edition appeared in 1999—he wrote hundreds of liner notes for jazz recordings beginning in the early 1950s and wrote several books about jazz and ice hockey, two of his passions.

== Jazz ==
Gitler was born at Brooklyn, New York into a Jewish family and grew up listening to swing bands in the late 1930s and 1940s, before discovering the new music of Charlie Parker and Dizzy Gillespie. In the early 1950s, he worked as a producer of recording sessions for the Prestige label. He is credited with coining the term "sheets of sound" in the late 1950s, to describe the playing of John Coltrane. In a review of Abbey Lincoln's album Straight Ahead published in the November 1961 issue of Down Beat magazine, Gitler controversially dismissed the record's engagement with Black politics, expressing regret that Lincoln had become a "professional Negro" who was "leaning too much on her Negritude" to "exploit a career."

Gitler was the New York editor of Down Beat magazine during the 1960s and wrote for Metronome Magazine, JazzTimes, Jazz Improv, Modern Drummer, The New York Times, the San Francisco Chronicle, the Village Voice, Vibe, Playboy, World Monitor, and New York magazine. Internationally, he contributed to Swing Journal (Japan), Musica Jazz (Italy) and Jazz Magazine (France). He was awarded a Guggenheim Fellowship in 1974.

Gitler was given Lifetime Achievement Awards by the New Jersey Jazz Society (in 2001) and by the Jazz Journalists Association (in 2002).

In 2017, Gitler was awarded an NEA Jazz Masters Fellowship.

== Ice hockey ==
Gitler's passion for ice hockey prompted him to write several books on the subject. He also wrote for the New York Rangers as well as the National Hockey League in their former magazine, Goal. He died in New York at the age of 90 on February 23, 2019.

== Books ==
- Jazz Masters of the Forties; New York: Macmillan, 1966.
- Make the Team in Ice Hockey; New York: Macmillan, 1968.
- Hockey! The Story of the World's Fastest Sport, with Richard Beddoes and Stan Fischler; New York: Macmillan, 1969.
- Blood on the Ice: Hockey's Most Violent Moments; Chicago: H. Regnery Co., 1974.
- The Encyclopedia of Jazz in the Seventies, with Leonard Feather; New York: Horizon Press, 1976. ISBN 0-8180-1215-3.
- Ice Hockey A to Z; New York: Lothrop, Lee & Shepard, 1978. ISBN 0-688-41842-2.
- Swing to Bop: An Oral History of the Transition in Jazz in the 1940s; New York: Oxford University Press, 1985. ISBN 0-19-503664-6.
- The Biographical Encyclopedia of Jazz, with Leonard Feather and the assistance of Swing journal (Tokyo); New York: Oxford University Press, 1999. ISBN 0-19-507418-1.
- The Masters of Bebop: A Listener's Guide; New York: Da Capo Press, 2001. ISBN 0-306-81009-3.
