= Red Garland =

American modern jazz pianist (1923–1984)

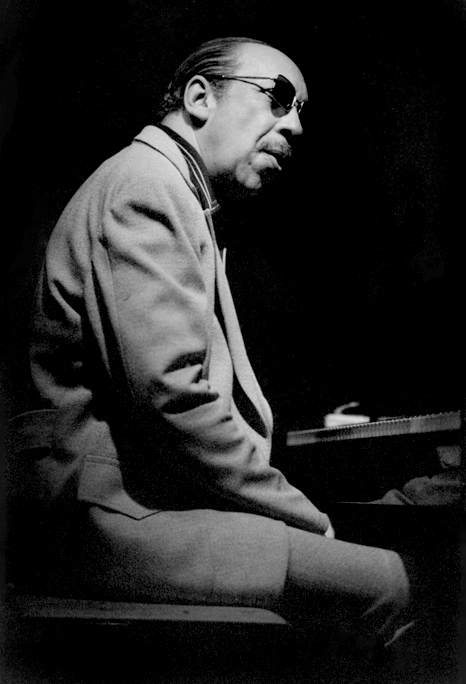
- Garland at Keystone Korner jazz club, San Francisco, California, May 1978

Background information
- Born: William McKinley Garland, Jr. May 13, 1923; Dallas, Texas, U.S.
- Died: April 23, 1984 (aged 60) Dallas, Texas, U.S.
- Genres: Jazz, straight-ahead jazz, bebop, hard bop
- Occupation: Musician
- Instrument: Piano
- Years active: 1940s–1984
- Labels: Prestige, Jazzland, Fantasy
- Formerly of: Miles Davis Quintet

William McKinley "Red" Garland Jr. (May 13, 1923 – April 23, 1984) was an American modern jazz pianist. Known for his work as a bandleader and during the 1950s with Miles Davis, Garland helped popularize the block chord style of playing in jazz piano.

== Early life and education ==
William "Red" Garland was born in 1923 in Dallas, Texas. He began his musical studies on the clarinet and alto saxophone, having studied with saxophonist Buster "Prof" Smith, who had been an early mentor of alto saxophonist Charlie Parker in Kansas City. His nickname came from Garland's hair color, though sources disagree on whether he had a natural reddish tint or if he artificially colored his hair.

He joined the United States Army in 1941 and was stationed in Fort Huachuca, Arizona. While there, Garland began to learn the piano with Army pianists John Lewis (not to be confused with John Lewis of the Modern Jazz Quartet) and Lee Barnes. At this time, he was also an amateur boxer, having fought Sugar Ray Robinson but losing the match.

After being discharged from the military in 1944, Garland continued teaching himself piano using classical piano exercise books by composers like Carl Czerny and Charles-Louis Hanon and heavily copying the style of Count Basie, who became his early idol. Garland played locally around Texas until 1946 when he joined the trumpet player Hot Lips Page's band, playing with him until a tour ended in New York in March 1946. Garland decided to stay in New York and soon found work there and also in Philadelphia. While in New York, Garland was recommended to singer Billy Eckstine, who hired him for several weeks.

== Musical career ==
=== 1955–1958: The first Miles Davis Quintet ===
Garland found success in 1955 when he joined the Miles Davis Quintet, featuring John Coltrane, Philly Joe Jones, and Paul Chambers. Davis was a fan of boxing and was impressed that Garland had boxed earlier in his life. Together, the group recorded their famous Prestige albums, Miles: The New Miles Davis Quintet (1956), Workin', Steamin', Cookin', and Relaxin'. Garland's style is prominent in these seminal recordings—evident in his distinctive chord voicings, his sophisticated accompaniment, and his musical references to Ahmad Jamal's style. Some observers dismissed Garland as a "cocktail" pianist, but Miles was pleased with his style, having urged Garland to absorb some of Jamal's lightness of touch and harmonics within his own approach.

Garland played on the first of Davis's many Columbia recordings, 'Round About Midnight (1957). Their relationship was already beginning to deteriorate, but he continued playing with Miles. By 1958, Garland and Jones had started to become more erratic in turning up for recordings and shows. He was eventually fired by Miles but later returned to play on another jazz classic, Milestones. Davis was displeased when Garland quoted Davis's much earlier, and by then famous, solo from "Now's The Time" in block chords during the slower take of "Straight, No Chaser". Garland walked out of one of the sessions for Milestones; on the track "Sid's Ahead", Davis comped behind the saxophone solos in his absence.

=== 1958–1984: Red Garland Trio and later life ===
In 1958, Garland formed his own trio. Among the musicians the trio recorded with are Pepper Adams, Nat Adderley, Ray Barretto, Kenny Burrell, Eddie "Lockjaw" Davis, Jimmy Heath, Harold Land, Philly Joe Jones, Paul Chambers, Blue Mitchell, Ira Sullivan, and Leroy Vinnegar. The trio also recorded as a quintet with John Coltrane and Donald Byrd. Altogether, Garland released 25 albums on Prestige Records and its subsidiary Moodsville, which were recorded between 1956 and 1962. He also recorded several albums for the Riverside Records subsidiary Jazzland in the early 1960s.

In the mid-to-late 1960s, Garland's career suffered when rock music caused a substantial drop in the popularity of jazz, and his record sales plunged. During this period, he returned to his Dallas, Texas to care for his mother. After her death in 1968, he left music for a number of years.

Garland resumed his recording career in 1971 with two albums for the German MPS Records label, and later in the decade recorded for Galaxy Records, Muse Records, Xanadu Records, and other jazz labels. In 1977, his Crossings album reunited him with Philly Joe Jones, with whom he also played club performances that same year. Garland continued recording until his death from a heart attack on April 23, 1984, at the age of 60.

== Artistry ==
In the original liner notes of Red Garland's Piano in 1957, jazz historian Ira Gitler wrote: "Red Garland's piano is an instrument effulgent with warm emotion. Red Garland is a pianist who eschews the flowery and champions the direct approach in a simple, subtle manner. His basic, solid style, developed along personal lines out of Nat Cole and Bud Powell, encompasses all moods and tempos with equal ease. Never syrupy on the ballads in ballad tempo or merely fleet on the up tempos, Red is especially buoyant in a soul-lifting way on the middle ground. Here is a musician who even if he played every cocktail lounge in the country could never be considered a 'cocktail lounge pianist.'" In addition to Cole and Powell, jazz writer Scott Yanow noted the influence of Ahmad Jamal present in Garland's style.

== Legacy ==
NPR inducted the album A Garland of Red into the NPR Basic Jazz Record Library in 2001. Staff broadcaster Murray Horwitz stated: "Red Garland is one of those musicians you probably know a lot more about than you think you do, but it's still not enough. He made his biggest splash as a sideman, but [...] A Garland of Red is some of the finest piano trio jazz you can find."

== Discography ==
=== As leader ===
Recording date	Title	Label	Year released	Personnel/Notes
1956-08	A Garland of Red	Prestige	1957	Trio, with Paul Chambers (bass), Art Taylor (drums)
1956-12, 1957-03	Red Garland's Piano	Prestige	1957	Trio, with Paul Chambers (bass), Art Taylor (drums)
1957-05	Red Garland Revisited!	Prestige	1969	Most tracks trio, with Paul Chambers (bass), Art Taylor (drums); some tracks quartet, with Kenny Burrell (guitar) added
1956-05, 1957-03, 1957-08	The P.C. Blues	Prestige	1970	Most tracks trio with Paul Chambers (bass), Art Taylor (drums); one track trio with Chambers (bass), Philly Joe Jones (drums)
1956-12, 1957-05, 1957-08	Groovy	Prestige	1957	Trio with Paul Chambers (bass), Art Taylor (drums)
1957-11	All Mornin' Long	Prestige	1958	Quintet, with John Coltrane (tenor sax), Donald Byrd (trumpet), George Joyner (bass), Art Taylor (drums)
1957-11	Soul Junction	Prestige	1960	Quintet, with John Coltrane (tenor sax), Donald Byrd (trumpet), George Joyner (bass), Art Taylor (drums)
1957-11, 1957-12	High Pressure	Prestige	1961	Quintet, with John Coltrane (tenor sax), Donald Byrd (trumpet), George Joyner (bass), Art Taylor (drums)
1957-03, 1957-12, 1958-02	Dig It!	Prestige	1962	One track trio, with Paul Chambers (bass), Art Taylor (drums); two tracks quintet, with John Coltrane (tenor sax), Donald Byrd (trumpet), George Joyner (bass), Taylor (drums); one track quartet, without Byrd
1958-02	It's a Blue World	Prestige	1970	Trio, with Paul Chambers (bass), Art Taylor (drums)
1958-04	Manteca	Prestige	1958	Quartet, with Paul Chambers (bass), Art Taylor (drums), Ray Barretto (congas)
1958-06	Can't See for Lookin'	Prestige	1963	Trio, with Paul Chambers (bass), Art Taylor (drums)
1958-08	Rojo	Prestige	1961	Quartet, with George Joyner (bass), Charlie Persip (drums), Ray Barretto (congas)
1958-11	The Red Garland Trio	Moodsville	1960	Trio, with Paul Chambers (bass), Art Taylor (drums)
1958-11	All Kinds of Weather	Prestige	1959	Trio, with Paul Chambers (bass), Art Taylor (drums)
1959-04	Red in Blues-ville	Prestige	1959	Trio, with Sam Jones (bass), Art Taylor (drums)
1959-08, 1959-10	Satin Doll	Prestige	1971	Most tracks trio with Doug Watkins (bass), Charles "Specs" Wright (drums); some tracks trio with Jimmy Rowser (bass), Taylor (drums)
1959-10	Red Garland at the Prelude	Prestige	1971	Trio, with Jimmy Rowser (bass), Charles "Specs" Wright (drums); in concert
1959-10	Lil' Darlin'	Status/Prestige	1965	Trio, with Jimmy Rowser (bass), Charles "Specs" Wright (drums); in concert
1959-10	Red Garland Live!	New Jazz/Prestige	1965	Trio, with Jimmy Rowser (bass), Charles "Specs" Wright (drums); in concert
1959-12	The Red Garland Trio + Eddie "Lockjaw" Davis	Moodsville	1960	Most tracks trio, with Sam Jones (bass), Art Taylor (drums); some tracks quartet, with Eddie "Lockjaw" Davis (tenor sax) added
1960-04	Red Alone	Moodsville	1960	Solo piano
1960-04	Alone with the Blues	Moodsville	1960	Solo piano
1960-07	Halleloo-Y'-All	Prestige	1964	Trio, with Sam Jones (bass), Art Taylor (drums); Garland plays organ on one track
1960-07, 1961-03	Soul Burnin'	Prestige	1964	Three tracks trio, with Sam Jones (bass), Art Taylor (drums); two tracks quintet, with Oliver Nelson (tenor sax, alto sax), Richard Williams (trumpet), Peck Morrison (bass), Charlie Persip (drums)
1961-07	Bright and Breezy	Jazzland	1961	Trio, with Sam Jones (bass), Charlie Persip (drums)
1961-11	The Nearness of You	Jazzland	1962	One track solo piano; most tracks trio, with Larry Ridley (bass), Frank Gant (drums)
1962-01	Solar	Jazzland	1962	Most tracks trio, with Sam Jones (bass), Frank Gant (drums); some tracks quartet, with Les Spann (guitar, flute) added
1962-03	Red's Good Groove	Jazzland	1962	Quintet, with Blue Mitchell (trumpet), Pepper Adams (baritone sax), Sam Jones (bass), Philly Joe Jones (drums)
1962-10	When There Are Grey Skies	Prestige	1963	Trio, with Wendell Marshall (bass), Charlie Persip (drums)
1971-05	The Quota	MPS	1973	Quartet, with Jimmy Heath (tenor sax, soprano sax), Peck Morrison (bass), Lenny McBrowne (drums)
1971-05	Auf Wiedersehen	MPS	1975	Trio, with Sam Jones (bass), Roy Brooks (drums)
1974-03	Groovin' Live	Alfa Jazz	1991	[2CD] Trio, with James Leary (bass), Eddie Marshall (drums); in concert
1974-03	Groovin' Live II	Alfa Jazz	1991	Trio, with James Leary (bass), Eddie Marshall (drums); in concert
1977-05	Keystones!	Xanadu	1977	Trio, with Leroy Vinnegar (bass), Philly Joe Jones (drums); in concert
1977-05	Groovin' Red	Keystone	1995?	Trio, with Leroy Vinnegar (bass), Philly Joe Jones (drums); in concert
1977-12	Red Alert	Galaxy	1978	Some tracks trio, with Ron Carter (bass), Frank Butler (drums); one track quartet, with Nat Adderley (cornet) added; two tracks sextet, with Harold Land and Ira Sullivan (tenor sax) added; one track quartet, with Sullivan, Carter, Butler
1977-12	Crossings	Galaxy	1978	Trio, with Ron Carter (bass), Philly Joe Jones (drums)
1978-05	Feelin' Red	Muse	1979	Trio, with Sam Jones (bass), Al Foster (drums)
1978-05	I Left My Heart...	Muse	1985	Some tracks trio, with Chris Amberger (bass), Eddie Moore (drums); some tracks quartet, with Leo Wright (alto sax) added; in concert
1978-08	Equinox	Galaxy	1979	Trio, with Richard Davis (bass), Roy Haynes (drums)
1979-07	Stepping Out	Galaxy	1981	Some tracks trio, with Ron Carter (bass), Ben Riley (drums); some tracks quartet, with Kenny Burrell (guitar) added
1979-07	So Long Blues	Galaxy	1984	Some tracks trio, with Ron Carter (bass), Ben Riley (drums); two tracks quartet, with Kenny Burrell (guitar) added; some tracks quintet, with Julian Priester (trombone), George Coleman (tenor sax) added
1979-07	Strike Up the Band	Galaxy	1982	One track quartet with Julian Priester (trombone), Ron Carter (bass), Ben Riley (drums); one track quartet with George Coleman (tenor sax), Carter (bass), Riley (drums); three tracks quintet, with all listed
1982-04	Misty Red	Sony Music Entertainment	1982	Trio, with Jamil Nasser (bass), Frank Gant (drums)

Compilations

- Rediscovered Masters (Prestige, 1977) – rec. 1958–61
- At the Prelude, Vol. 1 (Prestige, 1994) – rec. 1959. compilation of Red Garland at the Prelude + Red Garland Live!.
- Blues in the Night (Prestige, 1997) – rec. 1960. compilation of Halleloo-Y'-All + Soul Burnin'.
- Red's Blues (Prestige, 1998) – rec. 1956–62.
- Stretching Out (Prestige, 2002) – rec. 1959. compilation of Satin Doll + Lil' Darlin'.
- The Best of the Red Garland Quintets (Prestige, 2004)
- The Best of the Red Garland Trios (Prestige, 2004)

=== As sideman ===
With Arnett Cobb

- Sizzlin' (Prestige, 1960)
- Ballads by Cobb (Moodsville, 1960)

With John Coltrane

- Tenor Conclave with Al Cohn, Hank Mobley, Zoot Sims (Prestige, 1957)
- John Coltrane with the Red Garland Trio (Prestige, 1957) – reissued as Traneing In
- Soultrane (Prestige, 1958)
- Lush Life (Prestige, 1961)
- Settin' The Pace (Prestige, 1961)
- Standard Coltrane (Prestige, 1962)
- The Believer (Prestige, 1964)
- The Last Trane (Prestige, 1965)

With Miles Davis

- The Musings of Miles (Prestige, 1955)
- Miles: The New Miles Davis Quintet (Prestige, 1955)
- Cookin' with The Miles Davis Quintet (Prestige, 1956)
- Relaxin' with The Miles Davis Quintet (Prestige, 1956)
- Workin' with The Miles Davis Quintet (Prestige, 1956)
- Steamin' with The Miles Davis Quintet (Prestige, 1956)
- 'Round About Midnight (Columbia, 1957)
- Milestones (Columbia, 1958)

With others

- Curtis Fuller, Curtis Fuller with Red Garland (Prestige, 1963) – rec. 1957
- Coleman Hawkins, Coleman Hawkins with the Red Garland Trio (Swingville, 1959)
- Jackie McLean, McLean's Scene (Prestige, 1959) – rec. 1956–57
- Charlie Parker, Charlie Parker at Storyville (Blue Note, 1953)
- Art Pepper, Art Pepper Meets the Rhythm Section (Contemporary, 1957)
- Sonny Rollins, Tenor Madness (Prestige, 1956)
- Phil Woods, Sugan (Status/Prestige, 1965) – rec. 1957
