= List of recording sessions at Van Gelder Studio in 1950s =

This is a list of recording sessions at Van Gelder Studio in the 1950s.

Rudy Van Gelder commenced recording part-time in 1952 in Hackensack, beginning a long-standing association with the Blue Note label, but soon recorded for other labels including Prestige and Savoy. At the end of the decade, he moved to a purpose-built studio in Englewood Cliffs.

== List of recording sessions ==
Recording date	Album	Artist	Label
Hackensack
March 2, 1952 & January 31, 1953	Gil Mellé Quintet/Sextet	Gil Mellé	Blue Note
April 13, 1953 & June 10, 1954	The Jazz Guitarist	Chuck Wayne	Savoy
April 16, 1953	New Faces, New Sounds	Kenny Drew	Blue Note
June 18, 1953	Elmo Hope Trio	Elmo Hope	Blue Note
June 23, 1953	Al Cohn's Tones	Al Cohn	Savoy
October 25, 1953	Gil Mellé Quintet with Urbie Green and Tal Farlow	Gil Mellé	Blue Note
December 15, 1953	Kenny Dorham Quintet	Kenny Dorham	Debut
December 24, 1953	Sal Salvador Quintet	Sal Salvador	Blue Note
December 27, 1953	New Faces, New Sounds	Urbie Green	Blue Note
January 8, 1954, April 12, 1954 & September 29, 1954	Moody	James Moody	Prestige
January 20, 1954 & November 9, 1954	Early Art	Art Farmer	New Jazz
March 6, 1954	Miles Davis Volume 1	Miles Davis	Blue Note
March 15, 1954 & April 3, 1954	Blue Haze	Miles Davis	Prestige
April 3, 1954 & April 29, 1954	Walkin'	Miles Davis	Prestige
April 11, 1954	Tal Farlow Quartet	Tal Farlow	Blue Note
May 5, 1954	Here Comes Frank Foster	Frank Foster	Blue Note
May 9, 1954	Elmo Hope Quintet, Volume 2	Elmo Hope	Blue Note
May 10, 1954 & October 17, 1954	Joltin' Joe Roland	Joe Roland	Savoy
May 11, 1954	Monk	Thelonious Monk	Prestige
May 19, 1954 & May 26, 1955	When Farmer Met Gryce	Art Farmer & Gigi Gryce	Prestige
May 28, 1954, February 18, 1955 & March 8, 1955	A	Jimmy Raney	Prestige
June 7, 1954	The Art Farmer Septet	Art Farmer	Prestige
June 16, 1954	MJQ	Milt Jackson	Prestige
June 29, 1954 & December 24, 1954	Bags' Groove	Miles Davis	Prestige
July 3, 1954 & July 7, 1955	Bob Brookmeyer Quartet	Bob Brookmeyer Quartet featuring John Williams and Red Mitchell	Pacific Jazz
July 28, 1954 & July 28, 1955	Meditations	Elmo Hope	Blue Note
July 30, 1954	Cross Section	Billy Taylor	Prestige
August 8, 1954	New Faces, New Sounds	Julius Watkins Sextet	Blue Note
August 11, 1954	Jimmy Raney Quintet	Jimmy Raney	Prestige
August 11, 1954 & March 10, 1955	The Fabulous Thad Jones	Thad Jones	Debut
August 17, 1954	Blues and Other Shades of Green	Urbie Green	ABC-Paramount
August 18, 1954 & October 25, 1954	Moving Out	Sonny Rollins	Prestige
August 22, 1954	Lou Donaldson Sextet, Volume 2	Lou Donaldson Sextet	Blue Note
August 24, 1954 & August 26, 1954	Jay and Kai	J. J. Johnson and Kai Winding	Savoy
September 5, 1954	Gil Mellé Quartet featuring Lou Mecca	Gil Mellé	Blue Note
September 7, 1954	The Billy Taylor Trio with Candido	Billy Taylor with Candido	Prestige
September 22, 1954 & October 25, 1954	Thelonious Monk and Sonny Rollins	Thelonious Monk and Sonny Rollins	Prestige
September 24, 1954	The Eminent Jay Jay Johnson Volume 2	J. J. Johnson	Blue Note
September 29, 1954, January 28, August 24 & December 12, 1955	James Moody's Moods	James Moody	Prestige
October 12, 1954 & February 4, 1955	Pot Pie	Phil Woods with Jon Eardley	New Jazz
October 31, 1954 & January 30, 1955	Jazz Composers Workshop	Charles Mingus	Savoy
November 26, 1954 & November 4, 1955	Sock!	Gene Ammons	Prestige
December 7, 1954	King Pleasure Sings	King Pleasure	Prestige
December 13, 1954 & February 6, 1955	Horace Silver and the Jazz Messengers	Horace Silver	Blue Note
December 23, 1954 & January 9, 1955	Django	Modern Jazz Quartet	Prestige
December 24, 1954 & October 26, 1956	Miles Davis and the Modern Jazz Giants	Miles Davis	Prestige
January 6, 1955	Evolution	Teddy Charles	Prestige
January 21, 1955	Relaxed Piano Moods	Hazel Scott	Debut
January 25, 1955	The Randy Weston Trio	Randy Weston	Riverside
January 30, 1955 & March 29, 1955	Afro-Cuban	Kenny Dorham	Blue Note
February 7, 1955	Telefunken Blues	Kenny Clarke	Savoy
February 8, 1955	Jazz Laboratory Series, Vol. 2	Hall Overton	Signal
February 8, 1955	The 78 Era	Gene Ammons	Prestige
February 26, 1955	The Amazing Johnny Costa	Johnny Costa	Savoy
February 27, 1955	5 Impressions of Color	Gil Mellé	Blue Note
February 28, 1955	Piano: East/West	Freddie Redd / Hampton Hawes	Prestige
March 7, 1955	Jazz Laboratory Series, Vol. 1	Duke Jordan	Signal
March 10, 1955	New Piano Expressions	John Dennis	Debut
March 14, 1955	Hey There, Jon Eardley!	Jon Eardley	Prestige
March 15, 1955 & March 16, 1955	A Woman in Love	Barbara Lea	Riverside
March 15, 1955 & March 16, 1955	Joe Roland Quintette	Joe Roland	Bethlehem
March 20, 1955	Julius Watkins Sextet Vol. 2	Julius Watkins Sextet	Blue Note
March 27, 1955	Hank Mobley Quartet	Hank Mobley	Blue Note
March 30, 1955	Kenny Clarke & Ernie Wilkins	Kenny Clarke and Ernie Wilkins	Savoy
April 8, 1955 & April 11, 1955	George Lewis and His New Orleans Stompers Volume One	George Lewis	Blue Note
April 10, 1955	A Touch of Taylor	Billy Taylor	Prestige
May 4, 1955	The Fourmost Guitars	Jimmy Raney, Chuck Wayne, Joe Puma and Dick Garcia	ABC-Paramount
May 6, 1955	The Prophetic Herbie Nichols Vol. 1	Herbie Nichols	Blue Note
May 13, 1955	The Prophetic Herbie Nichols Vol. 2	Herbie Nichols	Blue Note
May 20, 1955	Milt Jackson Quartet	Milt Jackson	Prestige
May 31, 1955	Musician of the Year	Eddie Bert	Savoy
June 1955	Charlie Mariano	Charlie Mariano	Bethlehem
June 7, 1955	The Musings of Miles	Miles Davis	Prestige
June 10, 1955 & September 22, 1955	Bennie Green Blows His Horn	Bennie Green	Prestige
June 15, 1955	All Star Sessions	Gene Ammons	Prestige
June 22, 1955 & September 1, 1955	Encore	Eddie Bert	Savoy
June 28, 1955 & July 14, 1955	Bohemia After Dark	Kenny Clarke	Savoy
June 30, 1955	The Dual Role of Bob Brookmeyer	Bob Brookmeyer	Prestige
July 1955	Bud Freeman	Bud Freeman	Bethlehem
July 2, 1955	Concorde	Modern Jazz Quartet	Prestige
July 9, 1955	Blue Moods	Miles Davis	Debut
July 14, 1955	Presenting Cannonball Adderley	Cannonball Adderley	Savoy
July 19, 1955 & July 20, 1955	Hal Stein & Warren Fitzgerald	Hal Stein and Warren Fitzgerald	Progressive
July 21, 1955 & July 27, 1955	Thelonious Monk Plays Duke Ellington	Thelonious Monk	Riverside
July 26, 1955	That's Nat	Nat Adderley	Savoy
August 1, 1955, August 7, 1955 & April 19, 1956	Herbie Nichols Trio	Herbie Nichols	Blue Note
August 2, 1955	Flutes & Reeds	Ernie Wilkins and Frank Wess	Savoy
August 4, 1955	The Trio	Hank Jones, Wendell Marshall and Kenny Clarke	Savoy
August 5, 1955	Quintet / Sextet	Miles Davis and Milt Jackson	Prestige
August 23, 1955 & August 24, 1955	Hi Fi Party	James Moody	Prestige
August 29, 1955 & August 31, 1955	Get Happy with the Randy Weston Trio	Randy Weston	Riverside
September 1, 1955 & September 20 and 29, 1955	Montage	Eddie Bert/John Mehegan/Donald Byrd	Savoy
September 6, 1955 & September 20, 1955	Reflections	John Mehegan	Savoy
September 19, 1955	Scott Free	Bobby Scott	ABC-Paramount
September 27, 1955	Jazz Young Blood	Chuz Alfred, Ola Hanson and Chuck Lee	Savoy
September 29, 1955	Byrd's Word	Donald Byrd	Savoy
October 1955	Australian Jazz Quartet	The Australian Jazz Quartet	Bethlehem
October 4, 1955	Hope Meets Foster	Elmo Hope and Frank Foster	Prestige
October 10, 1955 & November 20, 1955	Duke Jordan Trio and Quintet	Duke Jordan	Savoy
October 11, 1955	Presenting... Jackie McLean	Jackie McLean	Ad Lib
October 15, 1955 & October 22, 1955	Nica's Tempo	Gigi Gryce	Signal
October 21, 1955	Art Farmer Quintet featuring Gigi Gryce	Art Farmer and Gigi Gryce	Prestige
November 1, 1955	Quartet-Quintet	Hank Jones	Savoy
November 1, 1955, November 3, 1955, November 29, 1955 & December 20, 1955	Bluebird	Hank Jones	Savoy
November 8, 1955	Top Brass	Ernie Wilkins	Savoy
November 15, 1955	A Pair of Pianos	John Mehegan and Eddie Costa	Savoy
November 16, 1955	Miles	Miles Davis	Prestige
November 17, 1955, April 23, 1956 & May 21, 1956	Portrait	Johnny Coates Jr.	Savoy
November 22, 1955	Mighty Mike Cuozzo	Mike Cuozzo	Savoy
November 25, 1955	Woodlore	Phil Woods	Prestige
November 29, 1955, March 12, 1956 & May 29, 1956	Night People	Mort Herbert	Savoy
December 2, 1955	Work Time	Sonny Rollins	Prestige
December 12, 1955	Wail, Moody, Wail	James Moody	Prestige
December 14, 1955 & December 27, 1955	Serenade in Blue	Al Caiola	Savoy
1956	The Jazz Organist	Doug Duke	Regent
1956	Rogers Revisited	Cy Walter	Atlantic
January 5, 1956	Roll 'Em Bags	Milt Jackson	Savoy
January 13, 1956	The Jon Eardley 7	Jon Eardley	Prestige
January 19, 1956	Wilder 'n' Wilder	Joe Wilder	Savoy
January 20, 1956	Jazz for the Carriage Trade	George Wallington	Prestige
January 23, 1956	Jackson's Ville	Milt Jackson	Savoy
January 27, 1956	Lights Out!	Jackie McLean	Prestige
January 30, 1956 & February 8, 1956	The Jazz Message of Hank Mobley	Hank Mobley	Savoy
February 6, 1956	Klook's Clique	Kenny Clarke	Savoy
February 14, 1956	Ballads & Blues	Milt Jackson	Atlantic
February 14, 1956	Fontessa	Modern Jazz Quartet	Atlantic
February 20, 1956 & March 2, 1956	Guitar Moods	Mundell Lowe	Riverside
March 2, 1956 & June 8, 1956	Earl Coleman Returns	Earl Coleman	Prestige
March 5, 1956 & March 7, 1956	North, South, East....Wess	Frank Wess	Savoy
March 5, 1956 & March 7, 1956	No 'Count	Frank Foster	Savoy
March 9, 1956	Fontainebleau	Tadd Dameron	Prestige
March 14, 1956 & March 21, 1956	With These Hands...	Randy Weston	Riverside
March 16, 1956	Collectors' Items	Miles Davis	Prestige
March 17, 1956 & April 3, 1956	The Unique Thelonious Monk	Thelonious Monk	Riverside
March 21, 1956	All About Ronnie	Ronnie Ball	Savoy
March 22, 1956	Sonny Rollins Plus 4	Sonny Rollins	Prestige
April 1, 1956	Patterns in Jazz	Gil Mellé	Blue Note
April 13, 1956	Bennie Green with Art Farmer	Bennie Green and Art Farmer	Prestige
April 17, 1956	Introducing Johnny Griffin	Johnny Griffin	Blue Note
April 20, 1956 & June 1, 1956	Primitive Modern	Gil Mellé	Prestige
April 23, 1956	The Happy Blues	Gene Ammons	Prestige
May 3, 1956 & May 4, 1956	Here Is Phineas	Phineas Newborn Jr.	Atlantic
May 7, 1956	Informal Jazz	Elmo Hope	Prestige
May 11, 1956 & October 26, 1956	Relaxin' with The Miles Davis Quintet	Miles Davis	Prestige
May 11, 1956 & October 26, 1956	Steamin' with The Miles Davis Quintet	Miles Davis	Prestige
May 11, 1956 & October 26, 1956	Workin' with The Miles Davis Quintet	Miles Davis	Prestige
May 19, 1956 & May 22, 1956	Patterns of Jazz	Cecil Payne	Savoy
May 24, 1956	Tenor Madness	Sonny Rollins	Prestige
May 29, 1956 & May 30, 1956	Introducing Kenny Burrell	Kenny Burrell	Blue Note
May 29, 1956 & May 30, 1956	Kenny Burrell Volume 2	Kenny Burrell	Blue Note
June 1956	Jazzville Vol. 1	Charlie Rouse-Julius Watkins Jazz Modes / Gene Quill-Dick Sherman Quintet	Dawn
June 9, 1956 & June 14, 1956	The Magnificent Thad Jones	Thad Jones	Blue Note
June 13, 1956, July 13, 1956 & July 20, 1956	4, 5 and 6	Jackie McLean	Prestige
June 15, 1956	Pairing Off	Phil Woods	Prestige
June 20, 1956	Opus in Swing	Frank Wess and Kenny Burrell	Savoy
June 22, 1956	Saxophone Colossus	Sonny Rollins	Prestige
June 29, 1956	Walking Down	Bennie Green	Prestige
June 29, 1956 & June 30, 1956	A Musical Offering	Don Elliott	ABC-Paramount
July 9, 1956 & August 8 and 20, 1956	Have You Met Hank Jones	Hank Jones	Savoy
July 13, 1956	Jammin' with Gene	Gene Ammons	Prestige
July 18, 1956	Trombones	Frank Wess, Henry Coker, Bill Hughes, Jimmy Cleveland and Benny Powell	Savoy
July 20, 1956	Mobley's Message	Hank Mobley	Prestige
July 23, 1956 & November 7, 1956	Jazz Message #2	Hank Mobley	Savoy
July 27, 1956	Mobley's 2nd Message	Hank Mobley	Prestige
July 28, 1956	Jutta Hipp with Zoot Sims	Jutta Hipp and Zoot Sims	Blue Note
July 30, 1956 & February 21, 1957	The John Lewis Piano	John Lewis	Atlantic
August 1956	The Jazz Harpist	Dorothy Ashby	Regent
August 3, 1956	2 Trumpets	Art Farmer and Donald Byrd	Prestige
August 10, 1956, August 24, 1956 & January 18, 1957	Gil's Guests	Gil Mellé	Prestige
August 14, 1956 & August 16 and 23, 1956	Easy Living	Mary Ann McCall with the Ernie wilkins Orchestra	Regent
August 17, 1956	A Garland of Red	Red Garland	Prestige
August 20, 1956	All About Urbie Green and His Big Band	Urbie Green	ABC-Paramount
August 21, 1956	Hank Jones' Quartet	Hank Jones	Savoy
August 31, 1956	Jackie's Pal	Jackie McLean	Prestige
September 1, 1956	Trio and Solo	Randy Weston	Riverside
September 4, 1956 & September 5, 1956	Knight Music	George Wallington	Atlantic
September 7, 1956	Tenor Conclave	Hank Mobley, Al Cohn, John Coltrane and Zoot Sims	Prestige
September 21, 1956	Whims of Chambers	Paul Chambers	Blue Note
September 26, 1956	Bright's Spot	Ronnell Bright	Regent
September 26, 1956 & October 16, 1956	Inside Hi-Fi	Lee Konitz	Atlantic
October 5, 1956	Rollins Plays for Bird	Sonny Rollins	Prestige
October 5, 1956 & December 7, 1956	Sonny Boy	Sonny Rollins	Prestige
October 18, 1956 & October 19, 1956	Barbara Lea	Barbara Lea	Prestige
October 26, 1956	Cookin' with the Miles Davis Quintet	Miles Davis	Prestige
November 2, 1956	The Young Bloods	Phil Woods and Donald Byrd	Prestige
November 4, 1956	Lee Morgan Indeed!	Lee Morgan	Blue Note
November 5, 1956 & November 7, 1956	Introducing Lee Morgan	Lee Morgan	Savoy
November 9, 1956	Mal-1	Mal Waldron	Prestige
November 10, 1956	6 Pieces of Silver	Horace Silver	Blue Note
November 23, 1956	Farmer's Market	Art Farmer	New Jazz
November 25, 1956	Hank Mobley Sextet	Hank Mobley	Blue Note
November 30, 1956	Mating Call	Tadd Dameron	Prestige
December 2, 1956	Lee Morgan Sextet	Lee Morgan	Blue Note
December 7, 1956	Tour de Force	Sonny Rollins	Prestige
December 14, 1956 & February 15, 1957	McLean's Scene	Jackie McLean	New Jazz
December 14, 1956 & March 22, 1957	Red Garland's Piano	Red Garland	Prestige
December 14, 1956, May 24, 1957 & August 9, 1957	Groovy	Red Garland	Prestige
December 16, 1956	Sonny Rollins, Vol. 1	Sonny Rollins	Blue Note
December 26, 1956 & January 5, 1957	Jazz for Playboys	Frank Wess, Joe Newman, Kenny Burrell and Freddie Greene	Savoy
December 28, 1956	All Night Long	Kenny Burrell	Prestige
1957	Nostalgia in Hi-Fi	Bert Buhrman	Regent
January 4, 1957	All Day Long	Kenny Burrell	Prestige
January 11, 1957	Funky	Gene Ammons	Prestige
January 13, 1957	Hank Mobley and his All Stars	Hank Mobley	Blue Note
January 25, 1957	Earthy	Kenny Burrell	Prestige
January 26, 1957	Three Trumpets	Donald Byrd, Art Farmer and Idrees Sulieman	Prestige
January 27, 1957	Wailing with Lou	Lou Donaldson	Blue Note
February 1, 1957	Kenny Burrell	Kenny Burrell	Prestige
February 2, 1957	The Magnificent Thad Jones Vol. 3	Thad Jones	Blue Note
February 8, 1957	Jackie McLean & Co.	Jackie McLean	Prestige
February 9, 1957	Four Altos	Phil Woods, Gene Quill, Sahib Shihab and Hal Stein	Prestige
February 10, 1957	K. B. Blues	Kenny Burrell	Blue Note
February 15, 1957 & August 30, 1957	Makin' the Changes	Jackie McLean	New Jazz
February 15, 1957 & August 30, 1957	A Long Drink of the Blues	Jackie McLean	New Jazz
February 15, 1957, August 30, 1957 & July 12, 1957	Strange Blues	Jackie McLean	Prestige
February 16, 1957	Olio	Thad Jones	Prestige
February 25, 1957 & March 22, 1957	Taylor's Wailers	Art Taylor	Prestige
March 1957 & April, 1957	Essais	André Hodeir	Savoy
March 1, 1957	The New York Scene	George Wallington	New Jazz
March 3, 1957	Blowing in from Chicago	Clifford Jordan and John Gilmore	Blue Note
March 5, 1957	2 Guitars	Kenny Burrell and Jimmy Raney	Prestige
March 5, 1957 & March 26, 1957	Dancing Jazz	Billy Ver Planck and his Orchestra	Savoy
March 7, 1957	Back Country Suite	Mose Allison	Prestige
March 8, 1957	Hank Mobley Quintet	Hank Mobley	Blue Note
March 12, 1957 & March 21, 1957	Flute Flight	Herbie Mann and Bobby Jaspar	Prestige
March 12, 1957 & March 21, 1957	Flute Soufflé	Herbie Mann and Bobby Jaspar	Prestige
March 15, 1957	Tuba Sounds	Ray Draper	Prestige
March 21, 1957	Flute Suite	A. K. Salim	Savoy
March 22, 1957	Interplay for 2 Trumpets and 2 Tenors	The Prestige All Stars	Prestige
March 22, 1957 & August 9, 1957	The P.C. Blues	Red Garland	Prestige
March 22, 1957, December 13, 1957 & February 7, 1958	Dig It!	Red Garland Quintet with John Coltrane	Prestige
March 24, 1957	Lee Morgan Vol. 3	Lee Morgan	Blue Note
March 29, 1957	Phil and Quill with Prestige	Phil Woods and Gene Quill	Prestige
April 5, 1957	Ray Bryant Trio	Ray Bryant	Prestige
April 6, 1957	A Blowin' Session	Johnny Griffin	Blue Note
April 12, 1957	Jammin' in Hi Fi with Gene Ammons	Gene Ammons	Prestige
April 14, 1957	Sonny Rollins, Vol. 2	Sonny Rollins	Blue Note
April 14, 1957	Coolin'	Teddy Charles	New Jazz
April 18, 1957	The Cats	Tommy Flanagan, John Coltrane, Kenny Burrell and Idrees Sulieman	Prestige
April 19, 1957 & May 17, 1957	Mal/2	Mal Waldron	Prestige
April 19, 1957, April 24, 1957, April 26, 1957 & May 1, 1957	Lea in Love	Barbara Lea	Prestige
April 20, 1957	Baritones and French Horns	Pepper Adams	Prestige
April 20, 1957	Dakar	John Coltrane	Prestige
April 21, 1957	Hank	Hank Mobley	Blue Note
April 26, 1957	Quadrama	Gil Mellé	Prestige
April 27, 1957	Teo	Teo Macero	Prestige
May 2, 1957 & June 7, 1957	The Jazz We Heard Last Summer	Herbie Mann	Savoy
May 3, 1957	Alto Madness	Jackie McLean and John Jenkins	Prestige
May 8, 1957	The Stylings of Silver	Horace Silver	Blue Note
May 10, 1957	On the Sunny Side	Paul Quinichette	Prestige
May 10, 1957 & July 18, 1958	Guitar Soul	Kenny Burrell/Tiny Grimes	Status
May 11, 1957	New Trombone	Curtis Fuller	Prestige
May 14, 1957	Curtis Fuller with Red Garland	Curtis Fuller and Red Garland	New Jazz
May 14, 1957	Yardbird Suite	Herbie Mann	Savoy
May 17, 1957	Cattin' with Coltrane and Quinichette	John Coltrane and Paul Quinichette	Prestige
May 18, 1957	Curtis Fuller and Hampton Hawes with French Horns	Curtis Fuller and Hampton Hawes	Prestige
May 19, 1957	Paul Chambers Quintet	Paul Chambers	Blue Note
May 31, 1957	Coltrane	John Coltrane	Prestige
May 31, 1957, August 16, 1957 & January 10, 1958	Lush Life	John Coltrane	Prestige
June 2, 1957	Cliff Jordan	Clifford Jordan	Blue Note
June 9, 1957	Swing and Soul	Lou Donaldson	Blue Note
June 14, 1957	For Lady	Webster Young	Prestige
June 16, 1957	The Opener	Curtis Fuller	Blue Note
June 21, 1957	After Hours	Thad Jones	Prestige
June 22, 1957 & June 28, 1957	The Prestige Jazz Quartet	Teddy Charles	Prestige
June 23, 1957	Hank Mobley	Hank Mobley	Blue Note
July 9, 1957 & November 7, 1957	Jazz Sahib	Sahib Shihab	Savoy
July 14, 1957	Bass on Top	Paul Chambers	Blue Note
July 19, 1957	Sugan	Phil Woods and Red Garland	Status
July 21, 1957	Dial "S" for Sonny	Sonny Clark	Blue Note
July 26, 1957	Jenkins, Jordan and Timmons	John Jenkins, Clifford Jordan and Bobby Timmons	New Jazz
July 30, 1957	Jazz is Busting Out All Over	Various Artists	Savoy
August 3, 1957	Bud! The Amazing Bud Powell (Vol. 3)	Bud Powell	Blue Note
August 4, 1957	Blues for Night People	Charlie Byrd	Savoy
August 4, 1957	Bone & Bari	Curtis Fuller	Blue Note
August 11, 1957	John Jenkins with Kenny Burrell	John Jenkins and Kenny Burrell	Blue Note
August 16, 1957, January 10, 1958 & March 26, 1958	The Last Trane	John Coltrane	Prestige
August 18, 1957	Curtain Call	Hank Mobley	Blue Note
August 23, 1957	John Coltrane with the Red Garland Trio	John Coltrane and Red Garland	Prestige
August 25, 1957	City Lights	Lee Morgan	Blue Note
September 1, 1957	Sonny's Crib	Sonny Clark	Blue Note
September 5, 1957	Jazz ...It's Magic!	Curtis Fuller	Regent
September 6, 1957. September 27, 1957 & October 10, 1957	Gil Evans & Ten	Gil Evans	Prestige
September 10, 1957	Jazz Eyes	John Jenkins and Donald Byrd	Regent
September 15, 1957	Blue Train	John Coltrane	Blue Note
September 17, 1957	Pretty for the People	A. K. Salim	Savoy
September 20, 1957	Wheelin' & Dealin'	Frank Wess	Prestige
September 22, 1957	Newk's Time	Sonny Rollins	Blue Note
September 29, 1957	The Cooker	Lee Morgan	Blue Note
October 9, 1957	Jazz and the Sounds of Nature	Yusef Lateef	Savoy
October 10, 1957	Prayer to the East	Yusef Lateef	Savoy
October 11, 1957	The Sounds of Yusef	Yusef Lateef	Prestige
October 13, 1957	Sonny Clark Trio	Sonny Clark	Blue Note
October 18, 1957	For Basie	Paul Quinichette	Prestige
October 20, 1957	Poppin'	Hank Mobley	Blue Note
October 23, 1957	The Congregation	Johnny Griffin	Blue Note
October 25, 1957 & December 6, 1957	Roots	Idrees Sulieman	New Jazz
November 1, 1957	Soprano Sax	Steve Lacy	Prestige
November 8, 1957	Local Color	Mose Allison	Prestige
November 10, 1957	Cliff Craft	Clifford Jordan	Blue Note
November 12, 1957	Two Altos	Art Pepper and Sonny Red	Regent
November 14, 1957	Jazz at Hotchkiss	George Wallington	Savoy
November 15, 1957	All Mornin' Long	Red Garland	Prestige
November 15, 1957	Soul Junction	Red Garland	Prestige
November 15, 1957 & December 13, 1957	High Pressure	Red Garland	Prestige
November 18, 1957 & February 2, 1958	Candy	Lee Morgan	Blue Note
November 17, 1957	Jazz for Playgirls	Billy Ver Planck's Orchestra	Savoy
November 19, 1957	The Cool Sound of Pepper Adams	Pepper Adams	Regent
November 22, 1957 & November 24, 1957	Red Rodney: 1957	Red Rodney	Signal
December 1, 1957	Curtis Fuller Volume 3	Curtis Fuller	Blue Note
December 8, 1957	Sonny Clark Quintets	Sonny Clark	Blue Note
December 15, 1957	Lou Takes Off	Lou Donaldson	Blue Note
December 20, 1957	The Ray Draper Quintet featuring John Coltrane	Ray Draper and John Coltrane	New Jazz
December 20, 1957, January 10, 1958 & December 26, 1958	The Believer	John Coltrane	Prestige
December 27, 1957	Triple Exposure	Hal McKusick	Prestige
1958	Tommy Edwards Sings	Tommy Edwards	Regent
1958	Music to Break a Sub-Lease	Don Costa's Freeloaders	ABC-Paramount
January 3, 1958	The Big Sound	Gene Ammons	Prestige
January 3, 1958	Groove Blues	Gene Ammons	Prestige
January 5, 1958	Cool Struttin'	Sonny Clark	Blue Note
January 13, 1958	Further Explorations	Horace Silver	Blue Note
January 22, 1958	Two Bones	Curtis Fuller	Blue Note
January 24, 1958	Young Man Mose	Mose Allison	Prestige
January 31, 1958	Mal/3: Sounds	Mal Waldron	Prestige
February 7, 1958	It's a Blue World	Red Garland Trio	Prestige
February 9, 1958	Peckin' Time	Hank Mobley and Lee Morgan	Blue Note
February 14, 1958	Just Wailin'	Herbie Mann	New Jazz
February 28, 1958	Blues Groove	Tiny Grimes and Coleman Hawkins	Prestige
March 7, 1958	Kenny Burrell and John Coltrane	Kenny Burrell and John Coltrane	New Jazz
March 9, 1958	Somethin' Else	Cannonball Adderley	Blue Note
March 13, 1958	Mainstream 1958	Wilbur Harden	Savoy
March 13, 1958	Countdown: The Savoy Sessions	John Coltrane and Wilbur Harden	Savoy
March 16, 1958	Minor Move	Tina Brooks	Blue Note
March 21, 1958	Hip Harp	Dorothy Ashby	Prestige
March 23, 1958	Back on the Scene	Bennie Green	Blue Note
March 26, 1958	Settin' the Pace	John Coltrane	Prestige
March 27, 1958	The Spirit of Charlie Parker	Frank Wess, Bobby Jaspar and Seldon Powell	World Wide
March 30, 1958	Smithville	Louis Smith	Blue Note
April 11, 1958	Manteca	Red Garland	Prestige
April 18, 1958	Ramblin' with Mose	Mose Allison	Prestige
April 24, 1958	The Saxophone Section	Coleman Hawkins	World Wide
April 28, 1958	Soul Stirrin'	Bennie Green	Blue Note
May 2, 1958	Blue Gene	Gene Ammons	Prestige
May 5, 1958	The Soul of Jazz	Bill Harris, Joe Wilder, Bobby Jaspar, Pepper Adams and Eddie Costa	World Wide
May 13, 1958 & June 24, 1958	Tanganyika Strut	Wilbur Harden and John Coltrane	Savoy
May 22, 1958	Dixieland New York	Bobby Donaldson's 7th Avenue Stompers	World Wide
May 23, 1958	Black Pearls	John Coltrane	Prestige
May 23, 1958, October 23, 1958 & April 8, 1960	Shirley's Sounds	Shirley Scott	Prestige
May 24, 1958	Time Waits: The Amazing Bud Powell (Vol. 4)	Bud Powell	Blue Note
May 27, 1958	Workin'	Shirley Scott	Prestige
June 16, 1958	"Senor Blues" / "Tippin'"	Bill Henderson with the Horace Silver Quintet	Blue Note
June 20, 1958	The Eddie "Lockjaw" Davis Cookbook	Eddie "Lockjaw" Davis	Prestige
June 24, 1958	Jazz Way Out	Wilbur Harden and John Coltrane	Savoy
June 27, 1958	Can't See for Lookin'	Red Garland	Prestige
June 27, 1958, August 12, 1959 & March 16, 1961	Rediscovered Masters	Red Garland	Prestige
July 11, 1958	Standard Coltrane	John Coltrane	Prestige
July 11, 1958 & December 26, 1958	Stardust	John Coltrane	Prestige
July 11, 1958 & December 26, 1958	Bahia	John Coltrane	Prestige
July 15, 1958, May 24 & June 16, 1959	Home Cookin'	Jimmy Smith	Blue Note
July 16, 1958	Six Views of the Blues	Jimmy Smith	Blue Note
July 18, 1958	Callin' the Blues	Tiny Grimes and J. C. Higginbotham	Prestige
July 28, 1958	Blues Walk	Lou Donaldson	Blue Note
August 15, 1958	Creek Bank	Mose Allison	Prestige
August 22, 1958	Rojo	Red Garland	Prestige
August 29, 1958	Outskirts of Town	The Prestige Blues-Swingers	Prestige
September 5, 1958	Basie Reunion	Paul Quinichette	Prestige
September 12, 1958	Jaws	Eddie "Lockjaw" Davis and Shirley Scott	Prestige
September 16, 1958 & September 18, 1958	Introducing the 3 Sounds	The Three Sounds	Blue Note
September 16, 1958, September 28, 1958 & February 11, 1959	Bottoms Up!	The Three Sounds	Blue Note
September 19, 1958	In a Minor Groove	Dorothy Ashby and Frank Wess	New Jazz
September 23, 1958 & September 30, 1958	The King and I	Wilbur Harden	Savoy
September 26, 1958	Mal/4: Trio	Mal Waldron	New Jazz
October 6, 1958	Blues Suite	A. K. Salim	Savoy
October 10, 1958	Midnight Oil	Jerome Richardson	New Jazz
October 17, 1958	Reflections	Steve Lacy	New Jazz
October 23, 1958	Scottie	Shirley Scott	Prestige
October 14, 1958	"Ain't That Love" / "Willow Weep For Me" "Ain't No Use" / "Angel Eyes"	Bill Henderson with the Jimmy Smith Trio	Blue Note
October 30, 1958	Moanin'	Art Blakey and The Jazz Messengers	Blue Note
November 7, 1958	Soul	Coleman Hawkins	Prestige
November 14, 1958	We Three	Roy Haynes, Phineas Newborn and Paul Chambers	New Jazz
November 16, 1958	The Art of The Trio	Sonny Clark	Blue Note
November 21, 1958	The Red Garland Trio	Red Garland	Moodsville
November 23, 1958	The 45 Session	Bennie Green	Blue Note
November 27, 1958	All Kinds of Weather	Red Garland	Prestige
December 5, 1958	The Eddie "Lockjaw" Davis Cookbook, Vol. 2	Eddie "Lockjaw" Davis	Prestige
December 7, 1958	Blues in the Night	Sonny Clark	Blue Note
December 14, 1958	Light-Foot	Lou Donaldson	Blue Note
December 19, 1958	Alone with the Blues	Ray Bryant	New Jazz
December 21, 1958	Off to the Races	Donald Byrd	Blue Note
December 29, 1958	The Scene Changes: The Amazing Bud Powell (Vol. 5)	Bud Powell	Blue Note
1959	The Amazing Nina Simone	Nina Simone	Colpix
January 9, 1959	Blow Arnett, Blow	Arnett Cobb	Prestige
January 18, 1959	Jackie's Bag	Jackie McLean	Blue Note
January 25, 1959	Walkin' & Talkin'	Bennie Green	Blue Note
January 31, 1959	Finger Poppin'	Horace Silver	Blue Note
February 5, 1959	Stasch	The Prestige Blues-Swingers featuring Coleman Hawkins	Swingville
February 13, 1959	Autumn Song	Mose Allison	Prestige
February 18, 1959	LD + 3	Lou Donaldson and The Three Sounds	Blue Note
February 20, 1959	Blue Stompin'	Hal Singer with Charlie Shavers	Prestige
February 27, 1959	Smooth Sailing	Arnett Cobb	Prestige
March 8, 1959	Just Coolin'	Art Blakey and the Jazz Messengers	Blue Note
March 20, 1959	Impressions	Mal Waldron	New Jazz
March 29, 1959	My Conception	Sonny Clark	Blue Note
March 29, 1959	Drums Around the Corner	Art Blakey	Blue Note
April 3, 1959	Hawk Eyes	Coleman Hawkins	Prestige
April 17, 1959	Red in Bluesville	Red Garland	Prestige
April 24, 1959	Scottie Plays the Duke	Shirley Scott	Prestige
April 28, 1959 & February 2, 1960	He Doeth All Things Well	The Raymond Rasberry Singers	Savoy
April 29, 1959	Very Saxy	Eddie "Lockjaw" Davis, Buddy Tate, Coleman Hawkins and Arnett Cobb	Prestige
May 1, 1959	Jaws in Orbit	Eddie "Lockjaw" Davis and Shirley Scott	Prestige
May 2, 1959	New Soil	Jackie McLean	Blue Note
May 14, 1959	Party Time	Arnett Cobb	Prestige
May 17, 1959	"I'm in the Mood for Love" / "Lazy River"	Leon Eason	Blue Note
May 20, 1959	Good Deal	The Three Sounds	Blue Note
May 21, 1959	Blues-ette	Curtis Fuller	Savoy
May 25, 1959	Please Mr. Jackson	Willis Jackson	Prestige
May 25, 1959 & February 26, 1960	Cool "Gator"	Willis Jackson	Prestige
May 25, 1959, November 9, 1959, February 26, 1960 & August 16, 1960	Blue Gator	Willis Jackson	Prestige
May 25, 1959, November 9, 1959, February 26, 1960 & August 16, 1960	Together Again!	Willis Jackson and Jack McDuff	Prestige
May 25, 1959, November 9, 1959, February 26, 1960 & December 13, 1961	Together Again, Again	Willis Jackson and Jack McDuff	Prestige
May 31, 1959	Byrd in Hand	Donald Byrd	Blue Note
June 3, 1959	Taylor's Tenors	Art Taylor	New Jazz
June 11, 1959	The Dreamer	Yusef Lateef	Savoy
June 11, 1959	The Fabric of Jazz	Yusef Lateef	Savoy
June 20, 1959	Gone with Golson	Benny Golson	New Jazz
July 1, 1959	From Hackensack to Englewood Cliffs	Ike Quebec	Blue Note
Englewood Cliffs
July 20, 1959	From Hackensack to Englewood Cliffs	Ike Quebec	Blue Note
August 2, 1959	Davis Cup	Walter Davis Jr.	Blue Note
August 12, 1959	Coleman Hawkins with the Red Garland Trio	Coleman Hawkins and Red Garland	Swingville
August 12, 1959, July 15, 1960, & March 16, 1961	Soul Burnin'	Red Garland	Prestige
August 12, 1959	Satin Doll	Red Garland	Prestige
August 13, 1959	Tiny in Swingville	Tiny Grimes	Swingville
August 21, 1959	Enough Said!	Bill Jennings	Prestige
August 25, 1959	The Curtis Fuller Jazztet	Curtis Fuller	Savoy
August 28, 1959	Groovin' with Golson	Benny Golson	New Jazz
August 29, 1959, August 30, 1959 & September 13, 1959	Blowin' the Blues Away	Horace Silver	Blue Note
September 8, 1959	The Modern Jazz Disciples	The Modern Jazz Disciples	New Jazz
September 11, 1959	All Soul	Johnny "Hammond" Smith	New Jazz
September 20, 1959	Hear My Blues	Al Smith with Eddie "Lockjaw" Davis	Bluesville
September 25, 1959	Winchester Special	Lem Winchester and Benny Golson	New Jazz
October 4, 1959	Fuego	Donald Byrd	Blue Note
October 8, 1959	Standards	The Three Sounds	Blue Note
October 16, 1959	Cry! – Tender	Yusef Lateef	New Jazz
October 20, 1959	Swing, Swang, Swingin'	Jackie McLean	Blue Note
October 21, 1959	Roamin' with Richardson	Jerome Richardson	New Jazz
October 25, 1959	Profile	Duke Pearson	Blue Note
October 30, 1959	Meet Oliver Nelson	Oliver Nelson	New Jazz
October 31, 1959 & November 28, 1959	The Time Is Right	Lou Donaldson	Blue Note
November 4, 1959	That Good Feelin'	Johnny "Hammond" Smith	New Jazz
November 9, 1959, February 26, 1960 & August 16, 1960	Cookin' Sherry	Willis Jackson	Prestige
November 10, 1959	Africaine	Art Blakey and the Jazz Messengers	Blue Note
November 13, 1959	Quiet Kenny	Kenny Dorham	New Jazz
November 19, 1959	Star Bright	Dizzy Reece	Blue Note
December 3, 1959	Willie's Blues	Willie Dixon and Memphis Slim	Bluesville
December 4, 1959	Soul Searching	Shirley Scott	Prestige
December 4, 1959 & April 12, 1960	Misty	Eddie "Lockjaw" Davis and Shirley Scott	Moodsville
December 5, 1959	Out of the Blue	Sonny Red	Blue Note
December 8, 1959	Opus de Blues	Frank Wess	Savoy
December 11, 1959	The Red Garland Trio + Eddie "Lockjaw" Davis	Red Garland and Eddie "Lockjaw" Davis	Moodsville
December 16, 1959 & December 19, 1959	Tender Feelin's	Duke Pearson	Blue Note
December 17, 1959	Imagination	Curtis Fuller	Savoy
December 18, 1959	Tate's Date	Buddy Tate	Swingville
December 20, 1959	Bacalao	Eddie "Lockjaw" Davis and Shirley Scott	Prestige
December 23, 1959	Gettin' with It	Benny Golson	New Jazz
