= The Believer (John Coltrane album) =

Studio album by John Coltrane
- Released: April 20, 1964
- Recorded: December 20, 1957 (4–5); January 10, 1958 (1–2); December 26, 1958 (3)
- Studios: Van Gelder Studio, Hackensack
- Genre: Jazz
- Length: 30:01 (Original LP); 44:27 (1996 CD reissue)
- Labels: Prestige; PRLP 7292
- Producers: Bob Weinstock and Esmond Edwards (3)

John Coltrane chronology
Live at Birdland (1964)	The Believer (1964)	Coltrane's Sound (1964)

The Believer is a jazz album by John Coltrane released in 1964 on Prestige Records, catalogue 7292. It was recorded by Rudy Van Gelder in Hackensack, New Jersey in 1957 and 1958.

As Coltrane's profile increased, for several years after his Prestige contract had expired, the label issued “new” Coltrane albums. The original album consists of three previously unissued tracks with Coltrane as a leader ("The Believer", "Nakatini Serenade" and "Do I Love You Because You're Beautiful?") from two separate recording sessions in 1958.

A CD version of the album released by the Original Jazz Classics label in 1996 has two additional tracks recorded in 1957, "Filidé" and "Paul's Pal", from the 1960 New Jazz Records release The Ray Draper Quintet featuring John Coltrane, catalogue 8228.

Many versions of the album exist (AllMusic lists nine), including a 2015 vinyl re-release on the Waxtime label (catalogue 772003 LP) and a Japanese CD version with "20bit K2 Mastering". A 2006 digital media release by Prestige includes the two additional tracks from the 1996 CD release, but a 2014 Doxy Records release has only the three original tracks.

== Reception ==
Professional ratings
Review scores
Source	Rating
Allmusic	3/5 stars
The Penguin Guide to Jazz	3/4 stars
The Rolling Stone Jazz & Blues Album Guide	3.5/5 stars

A review for AllMusic states: "this early solo outing finds Coltrane confident but just beginning to explore the kind of modalities with which he would soon revolutionize the world of jazz... Things to come are hinted at briefly in flurries of notes here and there, and it's fascinating to listen to the early work of this developing genius."

The authors of The Penguin Guide to Jazz called the album "a fascinating compilation for early sight and sound of young talent", and observed that "McCoy Tyner is the composer of the title-piece, two years before he joined Coltrane's group."

== Track listing ==
No.	Title	Writer(s)	Length
1.	"The Believer"	McCoy Tyner	13:47
2.	"Nakatini Serenade"	Calvin Massey	11:02
3.	"Do I Love You Because You're Beautiul?"	Richard Rodgers, Oscar Hammerstein II	5:12
Total length:			30:01

=== Bonus tracks on 1996 CD reissue ===
No.	Title	Writer(s)	Length
1.	"Filidé"	Ray Draper	7:15
2.	"Paul's Pal"	Sonny Rollins	7:11
Total length:			14:26 44:27

== Personnel ==
Tracks 1–3

- John Coltrane – tenor saxophone
- Red Garland – piano
- Paul Chambers – bass
- Donald Byrd – trumpet (#1–2)
- Freddie Hubbard – trumpet (#3)
- Louis Hayes – drums (#1–2)
- Art Taylor – drums (#3)

Tracks 4–5

- John Coltrane – tenor sax
- Gil Coggins – piano
- Ray Draper – tuba
- Spanky DeBrest – bass
- Larry Ritchie – drums
