= Larry Ritchie =

American jazz drummer

Larry Ritchie (born March 5, 1932) was an American jazz drummer and record/CD producer. He was born in Brooklyn, New York as Lawrence Ritchie to Walter Ritchie, an electrician, and Pearl Ritchie, a domestic worker, both of whom were migrants from rural Virginia.

Ritchie has recorded with John Coltrane, Ray Draper, and Jackie McLean. Examples of his jazz work are provided by McLean's Strange Blues (1957) and Freddie Redd's Music from The Connection (1960).

Ritchie was also a talented painter and by the mid-1960s, he devoted more of his time to painting than to music.

== Discography ==
With John Coltrane

- Like Sonny (Capitol, 1958–60)

With Ray Draper

- The Ray Draper Quintet featuring John Coltrane (Prestige, 1957)
- A Tuba Jazz (Jubilee, 1958)

With Jackie McLean

- Fat Jazz (Jubilee, 1957)
- Strange Blues (Prestige, 1957)

With Freddie Redd

- The Connection (Blue Note, 1960)
