= Jon Mayer =

American jazz pianist and composer (born 1938)

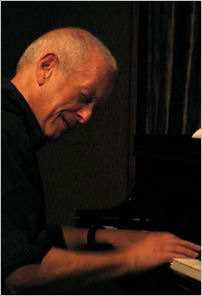

Background information
- Born: Jon David Stone Mayer; September 7, 1938 (age 87); Harlem, New York City, New York, U.S.
- Genres: Jazz; Hard bop
- Occupations: Musician, composer
- Instrument: Piano
- Labels: Reservoir, Fresh Sounds, A-Records, UDJ

Jon Mayer (born September 7, 1938 in New York City) is an American jazz pianist and composer.

== Discography ==
=== As leader ===
- Round Up the Usual Suspects (1995) – with Ron Carter, Billy Higgins
- Do It Like This (1998) – with Ernie Watts, Bob Maize, Harold Mason
- Rip Van Winkle: Live at the Jazz Bakery (1999) – with Bob Maize, Harold Mason
- Full Circle (2002) – with Rufus Reid, Victor Lewis
- The Classics (2003) – with Rufus Reid, Willie Jones III
- Strictly Confidential (2005) – with Chuck Israels, Arnie Wise
- My Romance (2005) – with Rufus Reid, Dick Berk
- So Many Stars (2007) – with Rufus Reid, Roy McCurdy
- Nightscape (2009) – with Rufus Reid, Roy McCurdy
- The Art of the Ballad (2014) – solo piano
- Live at the Athenaeum (2017) – with Darek Oles, Roy McCurdy

=== As sideman ===
With Jackie McLean

- Strange Blues (Prestige, 1957)

With John Coltrane

- Like Sonny (Roulette, 1958, 1960)
