= Buhrman =

Buhrman or Bührman is a surname. Notable people with the surname include:

- Bert Buhrman (died 1999), American organist
- Frits Bührman (1904–1930), Dutch athlete
- Harry Buhrman (born 1966), Dutch computer scientist
- Henry G. Buhrman (1844–1906), Union Army soldier
- Upton Buhrman (1818–1895), American politician from Maryland
