= Art Phipps =

Jazz musician

Arthur Phipps is a jazz double-bass player. His extensive session credits include work with Sonny Rollins, Babs Gonzales, Bruce Lawrence, Roy Haynes, Don Redman, Linton Garner, Wynton Kelly, Jordan Fordin, J. J. Johnson, Bennie Green, Julius Watkins, Albert Socarras, Paul Chambers, Mal Waldron, Art Taylor, Fats Navarro, John Richard Lewis, Jackie McLean, David Amram and Jackie Mills.

== Discography ==
With Jackie McLean

- Jackie McLean (1957). McLean's Scene. New Jazz/OJC.
- Jackie McLean - Makin' the Changes (New Jazz, 1957)
- Jackie McLean - Strange Blues (Prestige, 1957)
- Jackie McLean - A Long Drink of the Blues (Prestige, 1957)

With Sonny Rollins

- Sonny Rollins (2002). Real Crazy-Young Sonny: 1949-51. Jasmine Records.
- Sonny Rollins (2004). Complete Capitol, Savoy and Blue Note Feature Recordings. Definitive Classics.

With others

- David Amram (1957). Jazz Studio, Vol. 6: The Eastern Scene. Decca Records.
- Dizzy Gillespie; Tadd Dameron; Babs Gonzales (1949). Strictly Bebop. Capitol Records.
- Babs Gonzales (1947). Weird Lullaby. Blue Note Records.
