= Gil Coggins =

American jazz pianist

Gil Coggins (died February 15, 2004) was an American jazz pianist.

Coggins was born to parents of West Indian heritage. His mother was a pianist and had her son start on piano from an early age. He attended school in New York City and Barbados. In Harlem, New York City, he attended The High School of Music & Art.

In 1946, Coggins met Miles Davis while stationed at Jefferson Barracks in Missouri. After his discharge he began playing piano professionally, working with Davis on several of his Blue Note and Prestige releases. Coggins also recorded with John Coltrane, Sonny Rollins, Lester Young, Art Blakey's Jazz Messengers, Ray Draper, and Jackie McLean.

Coggins gave up playing jazz professionally in 1954 and took up a career in real estate, playing music only occasionally. He did not record as a leader until 1990, when Interplay Records released Gil's Mood. He continued performing through the 1990s and 2000s until 2004, when he died from complications sustained in a car crash eight months earlier in Forest Hills, New York. Better Late Than Never, his second album recorded as a leader, was released posthumously.

== Discography ==
- Gil's Mood (Interplay, 1990)
- Better Late Than Never (2003)

=== As sideman ===
With Miles Davis

- Miles Davis Volume 1 (Blue Note, 1956)
- Miles Davis Volume 2 (Blue Note, 1956)

With Ray Draper

- The Ray Draper Quintet featuring John Coltrane (New Jazz, 1957)

With Jackie McLean

- Fat Jazz (Jubilee, 1959)
- Makin' the Changes (New Jazz, 1960)
- A Long Drink of the Blues (New Jazz, 1961)
- Strange Blues (Prestige, 1967)
