= Capuchin Swing =

Studio album by Jackie McLean
- Released: Early December 1960
- Recorded: April 17, 1960
- Studio: Van Gelder, Englewood Cliffs
- Genre: Jazz
- Length: 40:37
- Label: Blue Note; BLP 4038
- Producer: Alfred Lion

Jackie McLean chronology
Swing, Swang, Swingin' (1959)	Capuchin Swing (1960)	Jackie's Bag (1961)

Capuchin Swing is an album by American saxophonist Jackie McLean, recorded in 1960 and released on the Blue Note label. It features McLean in a quintet featuring trumpeter Blue Mitchell, pianist Walter Bishop Jr., bassist Paul Chambers and drummer Art Taylor. McLean and Mitchell do not play on “Don’t Blame Me”.

== Reception ==
Professional ratings
Review scores
Source	Rating
AllMusic	4.5/5 stars
The Penguin Guide to Jazz Recordings	3/4 stars

The AllMusic review by Stephen Cook stated: "One of McLean's more underrated albums from a plethora of Blue Note releases, 1960's Capuchin Swing finds the bebop alto saxophonist in fine form on a mix of covers and originals... Capuchin Swing makes for a great introduction to McLean's extensive catalog".

== Track listing ==
All compositions by Jackie McLean except as indicated.

1. "Francisco" - 9:33
2. "Just for Now" (Walter Bishop, Jr.) - 7:33
3. "Don't Blame Me" (Dorothy Fields, Jimmy McHugh) - 4:24
4. "Condition Blue" - 8:13
5. "Capuchin Swing" - 6:10
6. "On the Lion" (Bishop) - 4:44

== Personnel ==
- Jackie McLean - alto saxophone
- Blue Mitchell - trumpet
- Walter Bishop, Jr. - piano
- Paul Chambers - bass
- Art Taylor - drums
