= Taylor's Tenors =

Studio album by Art Taylor
- Released: 1959
- Recorded: June 3, 1959
- Studio: Van Gelder Studio, Hackensack, New Jersey
- Genre: Jazz
- Length: 36:17
- Label: New Jazz; NJ 8219
- Producer: Bob Weinstock

Art Taylor chronology
Taylor's Wailers (1957)	Taylor's Tenors (1959)	A.T.'s Delight (1960)

Taylor's Tenors is the second studio album by drummer Art Taylor. It was recorded and released in 1959 for Prestige sub-label New Jazz, as NJ 8219. The album was reissued on CD once in 1995.

== Reception ==
Professional ratings
Review scores
Source	Rating
AllMusic	4/5 stars
MusicHound Jazz	4/5 stars
The Penguin Guide to Jazz Recordings	3.5/4 stars
The Rolling Stone Jazz & Blues Album Guide	4/5 stars

In a review for AllMusic, Al Campbell noted that although Taylor "played on a multitude of classic jazz sessions," he "only managed to release a few dates as a leader." He described the album as "an insightful yet swinging hard bop conversation."

The authors of The Penguin Guide to Jazz Recordings called the album a "cracker," and wrote: "Rouse didn't often have to play in two-tenor situations, but he acquits himself with honour against Foster, who moves like a particularly dangerous big cat through Taylor's flashing rhythms... Forty minutes or so of this sort of thing is enough; and this is just right."

Chris Hovan of MusicHound Jazz stated: "Taylor's Tenors is essentially a blowing session, but what a fine one it is! Charlie Rouse and Frank Foster make a killer tenor pair, and pianist Walter Davis is no slouch either."

A writer for Billboard called the album "a happy session," and noted that the tenor players "have a good blowing time." They commented: "All of the tunes are originals, and they move."

== Track listing ==
1. "Rhythm-A-Ning" (Monk) - 6:51
2. "Little Chico" (Rouse) - 5:03
3. "Cape Millie" (Walter Davis Jr.) - 6:15
4. "Straight No Chaser" (Monk) - 5:43
5. "Fidel" (Jackie McLean) - 6:51
6. "Dacor" (Art Taylor) - 5:34

== Personnel ==
- Art Taylor - drums
- Frank Foster, Charlie Rouse - tenor sax
- Walter Davis Jr. - piano
- Sam Jones - bass
