= Webster Young =

American jazz trumpeter and cornetist

- Born: Webster English Young; December 3, 1932; Columbia, South Carolina, US
- Origin: New York City, US
- Died: December 13, 2003 (aged 71) Vancouver, Washington, US
- Genres: Jazz
- Occupations: Educator, musician
- Instruments: Trumpet, cornet

Webster English Young (December 3, 1932 – December 13, 2003) was an American jazz trumpeter and cornetist.

Born in Columbia, South Carolina, and raised in Washington, D.C., Young was known for his lyrical playing, and performed with John Coltrane, Dexter Gordon, Hampton Hawes, Jackie McLean, and Ike and Tina Turner, among others. He recorded only sparingly; his principal album as a leader, For Lady (Prestige, 1957), was mainly dedicated to tunes associated with Billie Holiday.

In the late 1950s, at the suggestion of Miles Davis, Webster Young moved to New York City, where he began performing with musicians such as Lester Young and Bud Powell. During the mid-1960s, Young returned to Washington, D.C., where he became an educator, teaching music theory at the University of the District of Columbia; he was also director of the District of Columbia Music Center jazz workshop band.

Webster Young died on December 13, 2003, from brain cancer in Vancouver, Washington.

== Discography ==
=== As leader ===
- 1957: For Lady (Prestige) with Paul Quinichette, Joe Puma, Mal Waldron, Ed Thigpen, Earl May
- 1961: Webster Young Plays the Miles Davis Songbook (VGM) with Freddie Washington, Red Anderson, John Chapman, John Mixon, Chauncey Williams

=== As sideman ===
With Ray Draper

- Tuba Sounds (Prestige, 1957)

With Jackie McLean

- A Long Drink of the Blues (Prestige, 1957)
- Makin' the Changes (Prestige, 1957)
- Strange Blues (Prestige, 1957)
- Fat Jazz (Jubilee, 1958)

With The Prestige All Stars

- Interplay for 2 Trumpets and 2 Tenors (Prestige, 1957)
