= Fat Jazz =

Studio album by Jackie McLean
- Released: 1959
- Recorded: December 27, 1957
- Studio: New York City
- Genre: Jazz
- Length: 36:24
- Label: Jubilee; JLP 1093
- Producer: Charlie Mack

Jackie McLean chronology
Alto Madness (1957)	Fat Jazz (1959)	New Soil (1959)

Professional ratings
Review scores
Source	Rating
AllMusic	3/5 stars
The Penguin Guide to Jazz Recordings	3/4 stars

Fat Jazz, also referred to as Jackie McLean Plays Fat Jazz, is an album by American saxophonist Jackie McLean, recorded in late 1957 and released by the Jubilee label in 1959. It features McLean in a sextet with trumpeter Webster Young (here on cornet), tuba player Ray Draper, pianist Gil Coggins, bassist George Tucker and drummer Larry Ritchie.

== Track listing ==
1. "Filidé" (Jackie McLean, Ray Draper) – 7:21
2. "Millie's Pad" (Webster Young) – 8:32
3. "Two Sons" (Draper) – 7:17
4. "What Good Am I Without You?" (Don Rodney, Sammy Gallop) – 7:35
5. "Tune Up" (Miles Davis) – 5:31

== Personnel ==
- Jackie McLean – alto saxophone
- Webster Young – cornet
- Ray Draper – tuba
- Gil Coggins – piano
- George Tucker – bass
- Larry Ritchie – drums
