= Makin' the Changes =

Studio album by Jackie McLean
- Released: August 1960
- Recorded: February 15 & August 30, 1957
- Studio: Van Gelder, Hackensack, New Jersey
- Genre: Jazz
- Length: 35:53
- Label: New Jazz; NJ 8231
- Producer: Bob Weinstock

Jackie McLean chronology
Jackie McLean & Co. (1957)	Makin' the Changes (1960)	A Long Drink of the Blues (1957)

Professional ratings
Review scores
Source	Rating
AllMusic	4/5 stars
The Penguin Guide to Jazz Recordings	3/4 stars

Makin' the Changes is a studio album by saxophonist Jackie McLean. It was recorded in 1957 for Prestige, but not released until 1960 by the subsidiary label New Jazz as NJ 8231. It features three tracks with McLean in a quartet with pianist Mal Waldron, bassist Arthur Phipps and drummer Art Taylor, and three with a sextet featuring trumpeter Webster Young, trombonist Curtis Fuller, pianist Gil Coggins, bassist Paul Chambers and drummer Louis Hayes.

== Track listing ==
1. "Bean and the Boys" (Coleman Hawkins a contrafact of "Lover Come Back to Me") - 8:33
2. "What's New?" (Bob Haggart, Johnny Burke) - 7:09
3. "I Never Knew" (Gus Kahn, Ted Fiorito) - 3:00
4. "I Hear a Rhapsody" (Dick Gasparre, George Fragos, Jack Baker) - 5:08
5. "Jackie's Ghost" (Ray Draper) - 5:28
6. "Chasin' the Bird" (Charlie Parker) - 6:35

Recorded on February 15 (#1, 3-4) & August 30 (#2, 5-6), 1957.

== Personnel ==
Tracks 1, 3-4

- Jackie McLean - alto sax
- Mal Waldron - piano
- Arthur Phipps - bass
- Art Taylor - drums

Tracks 2, 5-6

- Jackie McLean - alto sax
- Curtis Fuller - trombone
- Webster Young - trumpet
- Gil Coggins - piano
- Paul Chambers - bass
- Louis Hayes - drums
