= Soul Eyes =

Composition by Mal Waldron

Composition by Mal Waldron

from the album Interplay for 2 Trumpets and 2 Tenors
- Language: English
- Recorded: March 22, 1957
- Genre: Jazz
- Length: 17:31
- Label: Prestige
- Composer: Mal Waldron
- Producer: Bob Weinstock

"Soul Eyes" is a composition, with lyrics, written by Mal Waldron. It is a 32-bar ballad that takes the song form ABAC, and is written in 4/4 time. It was first recorded on March 22, 1957, for the album Interplay for 2 Trumpets and 2 Tenors. One of the tenor saxophonists on that recording was John Coltrane, who brought the song back to attention by recording it in 1962 for his album Coltrane, when he had become more famous. This was only the second ever recording of the song, which has since become "part of the basic repertory of jazz performers" – a jazz standard. Waldron wrote the piece with Coltrane in mind: "I liked Coltrane's sound and I thought the melody would fit it."

Since these early versions, the song has been recorded hundreds of times. A vocal version is on Vanessa Rubin's debut album in 1992; another comparatively rare vocal version, featuring Jeanne Lee, is available on Waldron's 1997 album entitled Soul Eyes. In 2016, the song became the title track of Kandace Springs' debut album.
