= McLean's Scene =

Studio album by Jackie McLean
- Released: May 1959
- Recorded: December 14, 1956; February 15, 1957
- Studio: Van Gelder, Hackensack
- Genre: Jazz
- Length: 40:33
- Label: New Jazz; NJ 8212
- Producer: Bob Weinstock

Jackie McLean chronology
Jackie's Pal (1956)	McLean's Scene (1959)	Jackie McLean & Co. (1957)

Professional ratings
Review scores
Source	Rating
AllMusic	4/5 stars
The Penguin Guide to Jazz Recordings	3/4 stars
The Rolling Stone Jazz Record Guide	4/5 stars

McLean's Scene is a studio album by saxophonist Jackie McLean. It was recorded in 1956 and 1957, but not released until 1959 on Prestige's subsidiary label New Jazz Records, as NJ 8212. It was reissued on CD in 1991. Three tracks features McLean in a quintet with trumpeter Bill Hardman, pianist William “Red” Garland, bassist Paul Chambers and drummer Art Taylor, and the remainder a quartet with pianist Mal Waldron, bassist Art Phipps and Art Taylor.

== Track listing ==
1. "Gone with the Wind" (Allie Wrubel, Herb Magidson) - 7:31
2. "Our Love Is Here to Stay" (George Gershwin, Ira Gershwin) - 4:21
3. "Mean to Me" (Fred E. Ahlert, Roy Turk) - 8:50
4. "McLean's Scene" (McLean) - 10:21
5. "Old Folks" (Dedette Lee Hill, Willard Robison) - 4:56
6. "Outburst" (McLean) - 4:34

Recorded on December 14, 1956 (#1, 3, 4), and February 15, 1957(#2, 5, 6).

== Personnel ==
Tracks 1, 3, 4

- Jackie McLean - alto sax
- Bill Hardman - trumpet
- Red Garland - piano
- Paul Chambers - bass
- Art Taylor - drums

Tracks 2, 5, 6

- Jackie McLean - alto sax
- Mal Waldron - piano
- Arthur Phipps - bass
- Art Taylor - drums
