= Coltrane (1962 album) =

Studio album by John Coltrane
- Released: July 1962
- Recorded: April 11, June 19, 20, and 29, 1962
- Studio: Van Gelder (Englewood Cliffs)
- Genre: Modal jazz
- Length: 39:55 (Original LP); 47:12 (1997 CD release)
- Label: Impulse!
- Producer: Bob Thiele

John Coltrane chronology
Coltrane Plays the Blues (1962)	Coltrane (1962)	Standard Coltrane (1962)

Coltrane is a studio album by the jazz saxophonist, bandleader, and composer John Coltrane. It was released in July 1962 through Impulse! Records. The recording was made in April and June 1962 at the Van Gelder Studio.

At the time of release it was overlooked by the music press, but has since come to be regarded as a significant recording in Coltrane's discography. When reissued on CD, it featured a Coltrane composition dedicated to his musical influence "Big Nick" Nicholas that the saxophonist recorded for his Duke Ellington collaboration Duke Ellington & John Coltrane (1963). The composition "Tunji" was written by Coltrane in dedication to the Nigerian drummer Babatunde Olatunji.

== Release history ==
The album was released in July 1962 through Impulse! Records. According to All About Jazz writer Mark Werlin, Coltrane was initially overlooked in the music press, and later by music historians, because of the "hostility and incomprehension" that had met the saxophonist's controversial performances alongside fellow saxophonist Eric Dolphy at the Village Vanguard in 1961 and on tour in the US and Europe: "[The album] was intentionally shadowed—at the time of its recording—by a campaign of uninformed music criticism and personal attacks on Coltrane and Dolphy published in prestigious American newspapers and the preeminent jazz magazine Down Beat."

In 2002, Impulse! reissued Coltrane as a two-CD deluxe edition with the disclaimer that it used "second-generation, compressed and equalized tapes of all tracks", except "Miles' Mode", whose original master was still in existence, along with bonus tracks and alternate takes mastered from original recordings. In 2016, the Verve Label Group rereleased the album in commemoration of Coltrane's 90th birthday, as a 192 kHz/24bit digital download.

== Critical reception and analysis ==
Professional ratings
Review scores
Source	Rating
AllMusic	4.5/5 stars
Down Beat	4.5/5 stars
Encyclopedia of Popular Music	4/5 stars
New Record Mirror	3/5 stars
The Penguin Guide to Jazz	3.5/4 stars
The Rolling Stone Jazz Record Guide	4/5 stars
Tom Hull – on the Web	A−

According to Werlin, "The music of Coltrane is modal jazz, but far from the cerebral music advanced by George Russell or the comparatively restrained work by the Miles Davis Sextet on Kind of Blue." Ultimately, Werlin regards the album as a "major" work of Coltrane and his quartet. AllMusic's Michael G. Nastos calls the album "a most focused effort, a relatively popular session to both [Coltrane's] fans or latecomers, with five selections that are brilliantly conceived and rendered." He found Coltrane "simply masterful" on tenor saxophone with a "fully formed instrumental voice" that "shine[s] through in the most illuminating manner", and wrote of the album's standing in his catalog:

Even more than any platitudes one can heap on this extraordinary recording, it historically falls between the albums Olé Coltrane and Impressions — completing a triad of studio efforts that are as definitive as anything Coltrane ever produced, and highly representative of him in his prime.

Francis Davis of The Village Voice feels that, apart from the "modal, three-quarter time novelty hit" "The Inch Worm", consumers should buy the album for "the gorgeous 'Soul Eyes' and a shattering 'Out of This World'."

== Track listing ==
=== LP track listing ===
Side one
No.	Title	Writer(s)	Length
1.	"Out of This World"	Harold Arlen, Johnny Mercer	14:06
2.	"Soul Eyes"	Mal Waldron	5:26
Total length:			19:32

Side two
No.	Title	Writer(s)	Length
1.	"The Inch Worm"	Frank Loesser	6:19
2.	"Tunji"	Coltrane	6:33
3.	"Miles' Mode"	Coltrane	7:31
Total length:			20:23 39:55

=== 1997 CD bonus tracks ===
No.	Title	Writer(s)	Length
6.	"Big Nick"	Coltrane	4:04
7.	"Up 'Gainst the Wall"	Coltrane	3:13
Total length:			47:12

=== 2002 Deluxe edition ===
Side one
No.	Title	Writer(s)	Length
1.	"Out of This World"	Harold Arlen, Johnny Mercer	14:04
2.	"Soul Eyes"	Mal Waldron	5:25
3.	"The Inch Worm"	Frank Loesser	6:14
4.	"Tunji"	Coltrane	6:32
5.	"Miles' Mode"	Coltrane	7:31
Total length:			39:46

Disc two
No.	Title	Writer(s)	Length
1.	"Not Yet"	Tyner	6:13
2.	"Miles' Mode (Take 2)"		7:08
3.	"Tunji (Take 1)"		10:41
4.	"Tunji (Take 4)"		7:55
5.	"Tunji (Take 5)"		7:16
6.	"Tunji (Take 7)"		7:48
7.	"Impressions (Take 1)"	Coltrane	6:32
8.	"Impressions (Take 2)"		4:33
9.	"Big Nick"		4:28
10.	"Up 'gainst the Wall"		3:15
Total length:			65:49 105:35

== Personnel ==
=== John Coltrane Quartet ===
- John Coltrane – tenor saxophone, soprano saxophone
- McCoy Tyner – piano
- Jimmy Garrison – bass
- Elvin Jones – drums

=== Technical personnel ===
- Bob Thiele – producer
- Pete Turner – photography
