= For Lady =

Studio album by Webster Young
- Released: 1957
- Recorded: June 14, 1957; Van Gelder Studio, Hackensack, New Jersey
- Genre: Jazz
- Length: 42:09
- Label: Prestige; PR 7106
- Producer: Bob Weinstock

Webster Young chronology
Interplay for 2 Trumpets and 2 Tenors (1957)	For Lady (1957)	Webster Young Plays the Miles Davis Songbook (1961)

For Lady (subtitled songs Billie Holiday made famous... an instrumental tribute to her great talents) is an album by the American jazz cornetist Webster Young. It contains tracks recorded in 1957 for the Prestige label.

== Reception ==
Professional ratings
Review scores
Source	Rating
AllMusic	3/5 stars

AllMusic awarded the album 3 stars, with its review by Jim Todd stating: "While trumpeter Webster Young pays tribute to Billie Holiday on this, his only studio date as a leader, the set is equally a tribute to Young's musical role model, Miles Davis." All About Jazz praised the album's "sleepy sadness," writing that "Young's approach to the trumpet was relaxed and steady ... bucking the trend toward the poker-hot heat beginning to be exhibited by Lee Morgan and Freddie Hubbard."

== Track listing ==
1. "The Lady" (Webster Young) – 7:00
2. "God Bless the Child" (Billie Holiday, Arthur Herzog, Jr.) – 7:05
3. "Moanin' Low" (Howard Dietz, Ralph Rainger) – 7:42
4. "Good Morning Heartache" (Ervin Drake, Dan Fisher, Irene Higginbotham) – 8:54
5. "Don't Explain" (Holiday, Herzog) – 7:10
6. "Strange Fruit" (Abel Meeropol) – 4:18

== Personnel ==
- Webster Young – cornet
- Paul Quinichette – tenor saxophone
- Mal Waldron – piano
- Joe Puma – guitar
- Earl May – double bass
- Ed Thigpen – drums
