= Davis Cup (album) =

Studio album by Walter Davis Jr.
- Released: June 1960
- Recorded: August 2, 1959
- Studio: Van Gelder Studio; Englewood Cliffs, New Jersey
- Genre: Hard bop
- Length: 37:51
- Label: Blue Note; BLP 4018
- Producer: Alfred Lion

Walter Davis Jr. chronology
Davis Cup (1960)	Night Song (1979)

Davis Cup is the debut album by American jazz pianist Walter Davis Jr. recorded on August 2, 1959 and released on Blue Note the following year—Davis's sole release for the label, and one of his few recordings as leader.

== Reception ==
Professional ratings
Review scores
Source	Rating
AllMusic	4.5/5 stars
The Penguin Guide to Jazz Recordings	3/4 stars

In his review for AllMusic, Stephen Thomas Erlewine says, "Walter Davis Jr.'s debut record as a leader for Blue Note is a terrific hard bop session, a driving collection of six original tunes that emphasize the strengths not only of the pianist himself, but also his supporting band... It all adds up to a wonderful straight-ahead hard bop date, one that's so good it's a wonder that Davis didn't receive another chance to lead a session until 1979."

== Track listing ==
All tracks composed by Walter Davis Jr.

=== Side 1 ===
1. "'Smake It" – 5:08
2. "Loodle-Lot" – 5:58
3. "Sweetness" – 8:14

=== Side 2 ===
1. "Rhumba Nhumba" – 6:59
2. "Minor Mind" – 6:26
3. "Millie's Delight" – 5:06

== Personnel ==
=== Musicians ===
- Walter Davis Jr. – piano
- Donald Byrd – trumpet
- Jackie McLean – alto saxophone
- Sam Jones – bass
- Art Taylor – drums

=== Technical personnel ===
- Alfred Lion – production
- Rudy Van Gelder – recording engineer, mastering
- Reid Miles – design
- Francis Wolff – photography
- Joe Goldberg – liner notes
