= Jackie's Pal =

Studio album by Jackie McLean Quintet
- Released: February 1957
- Recorded: August 31, 1956
- Studio: Van Gelder, Hackensack
- Genre: Jazz
- Length: 42:09
- Label: Prestige; PRLP 7068
- Producer: Bob Weinstock

Jackie McLean Quintet chronology
4, 5 and 6 (1956)	Jackie's Pal (1957)	McLean's Scene (1956)

Alternative cover
- Steeplechase (1963, NJ 8290)

Professional ratings
Review scores
Source	Rating
AllMusic	3/5 stars
The Penguin Guide to Jazz Recordings	3/4 stars

Jackie's Pal is a studio album by saxophonist Jackie McLean, his third issued recording for Prestige Records. It was recorded in 1956 and first released as PRLP 7068. In 1963, like the previous 4, 5 and 6, the album was reissued on the Prestige subsidiary label New Jazz Records, as NJ 8290, with a different cover and retitled Steeplechase. It was reissued on CD in 1991 under the original title. It features McLean in a quintet with trumpeter Bill Hardman, bassist Paul Chambers and drummer Philly Joe Jones.

== Track listing ==
1. "Sweet Doll" (McLean) - 6:06
2. "Just for Marty" (Bill Hardman) - 6:39
3. "Dee's Dilemma (Mal Waldron) - 7:06
4. "Sublues (Hardman) - 8:03
5. "Steeplechase" (Charlie Parker) - 8:12
6. "It Could Happen to You" (Johnny Burke, Jimmy Van Heusen) - 6:03

== Personnel ==
- Jackie McLean - alto sax (except track 6)
- Bill Hardman - trumpet
- Mal Waldron - piano
- Paul Chambers - bass
- Philly Joe Jones - drums
