= Interplay for 2 Trumpets and 2 Tenors =

Studio album by Idrees Sulieman, Webster Young, John Coltrane and Bobby Jaspar
- Released: November 1957
- Recorded: March 22, 1957
- Studio: Van Gelder Studio, Hackensack, NJ
- Genre: Jazz
- Length: 46:58
- Label: Prestige; PRLP 7112
- Producer: Bob Weinstock

Interplay for 2 Trumpets and 2 Tenors is a jazz album released in November 1957 by Prestige Records. It is credited to Idrees Sulieman, Webster Young, John Coltrane and Bobby Jaspar, with Mal Waldron, Kenny Burrell, Paul Chambers and Art Taylor.

== Overview ==
Interplay for 2 Trumpets and 2 Tenors was released in November 1957 on Prestige Records as 7112. The record features the first recording of pianist Mal Waldron's composition, "Soul Eyes", which went on to become a jazz standard. Some CD reissues also include the bonus track "C.T.A." (Jimmy Heath), originally issued on Taylor's Wailers, recorded the same day, with just Coltrane, Chambers, Taylor and pianist Red Garland. The album would also be issued in 1964 as Jazz Interplay, a 2-LP compilation credited to Coltrane alone, which features tracks from other albums.

== Reception ==
Professional ratings
Review scores
| Source | Rating |
|---|---|
| AllMusic | 3.5/5 stars |

Lindsay Planer of AllMusic reviewed the album stating: "This interesting blend of instrumentalists lives up to its potential".

== Track listing ==
All compositions by Mal Waldron

1. "Interplay" – 9:41
2. "Anatomy" – 11:54
3. "Light Blue" – 7:52
4. "Soul Eyes" – 17:31

== Personnel ==
- John Coltrane, Bobby Jaspar – tenor saxophone
- Idrees Sulieman, Webster Young – trumpet
- Mal Waldron – piano
- Kenny Burrell – guitar
- Paul Chambers – bass
- Art Taylor – drums
