= Jackie McLean & Co. =

Studio album by Jackie McLean
- Released: June 1957
- Recorded: February 8, 1957
- Studio: Van Gelder, Hackensack, New Jersey
- Genre: Jazz
- Length: 41:47
- Label: Prestige; PRLP 7087
- Producer: Bob Weinstock

Jackie McLean chronology
McLean's Scene (1957)	Jackie McLean & Co. (1957)	Makin' the Changes (1957)

Professional ratings
Review scores
Source	Rating
AllMusic	3/5 stars
The Penguin Guide to Jazz Recordings	2.5/4 stars

Jackie McLean & Co. is a studio album by saxophonist Jackie McLean. It was recorded and released in 1957 on Prestige. It was also reissued on New Jazz Records as NJ 8323. It features McLean in a quintet with trumpeter Bill Hardman, pianist Mal Waldron, bassist Doug Watkins and drummer Art Taylor. Tuba player Ray Draper appears on three tracks.

== Track listing ==
1. "Flickers" (Waldron) - 6:59
2. "Help" (Watkins) - 8:42
3. "Minor Dream" (Draper) - 7:50
4. "Beau Jack" (McLean) - 11:26
5. "Mirage" (Waldron) - 9:50

== Personnel ==
- Jackie McLean - alto sax
- Bill Hardman - trumpet
- Ray Draper - tuba (tracks 1–3)
- Mal Waldron - piano
- Doug Watkins - bass
- Art Taylor - drums
