= A Long Drink of the Blues =

Studio album by Jackie McLean
- Released: Early June 1961
- Recorded: August 30, 1957 (1–2); February 15, 1957 (3–5)
- Studio: Van Gelder, Hackensack, New Jersey
- Genre: Jazz
- Length: 45:05
- Label: New Jazz
- Producer: Bob Weinstock

Jackie McLean chronology
Makin' the Changes (1957)	A Long Drink of the Blues (1961)	Strange Blues (1957)

A Long Drink of the Blues is a studio album by saxophonist Jackie McLean. It was recorded in 1957, and released in 1961 on New Jazz Records as NJ 8253. It features two tracks with McLean in a sextet featuring trumpeter Webster Young, trombonist Curtis Fuller, bassist Paul Chambers and drummer Louis Hayes, and three with a quartet featuring pianist Mal Waldron, bassist Art Phipps and drummer Art Taylor.

== Reception ==
Professional ratings
Review scores
Source	Rating
AllMusic	4/5 stars
DownBeat	4/5 stars
The Penguin Guide to Jazz Recordings	3/4 stars

The contemporaneous DownBeat reviewer picked "These Foolish Things" as the highlight, stating that McLean's playing of the bridge in his two solo choruses varied effectively, giving "a different emotional experience to the listener".

== Track listing ==
1. "A Long Drink of the Blues" [Take 1] false start - 2:21
2. "A Long Drink of the Blues" (McLean) [Take 2] - 20:49
3. "Embraceable You" (Gershwin, Gershwin) - 7:07
4. "I Cover the Waterfront" (Heyman, Green) - 6:27
5. "These Foolish Things (Remind Me of You)" (Link, Marvell, Strachey) - 8:21

== Personnel ==
- Jackie McLean - alto and tenor sax (1–2) alto sax (3–5)
- Webster Young - trumpet (1–2)
- Curtis Fuller - trombone (1–2)
- Gil Coggins (1–2), Mal Waldron (3–5) - piano
- Paul Chambers (1–2), Arthur Phipps (3–5) - bass
- Louis Hayes (1–2), Art Taylor (3–5) - drums
