= Alto Madness =

Studio album by Jackie McLean and John Jenkins
- Released: 1957
- Recorded: May 3, 1957
- Studio: Van Gelder, Hackensack, New Jersey
- Genre: Jazz
- Length: 39:26
- Label: Prestige; PRLP 7114
- Producer: Bob Weinstock

Jackie McLean chronology
Strange Blues (1957)	Alto Madness (1957)	Fat Jazz (1959)

John Jenkins chronology
Alto Madness (1957)	Jenkins, Jordan and Timmons (1957)

Alto Madness is an album by alto saxophonists Jackie McLean and John Jenkins, recorded in 1957 and released on the Prestige label. The rhythm section is pianist Wade Legge, bassist Doug Watkins and drummer Art Taylor.

== Reception ==
Professional ratings
Review scores
Source	Rating
AllMusic	3.5/5 stars
The Penguin Guide to Jazz Recordings	3/4 stars
The Rolling Stone Jazz Record Guide	3/5 stars

The AllMusic review by Scott Yanow stated: "McLean became much more individual within a few years, while Jenkins would fade from the scene altogether. This likable jam session features plenty of tradeoffs by the two altoists".

== Track listing ==
All compositions by John Jenkins, except where indicated.

1. "Alto Madness" (Jackie McLean) – 11:48
2. "Windy City" – 6:59
3. "The Lady Is a Tramp" (Lorenz Hart, Richard Rodgers) – 6:49
4. "Easy Living" (Ralph Rainger, Leo Robin) – 7:35
5. "Pondering" – 6:15

== Personnel ==
- Jackie McLean, John Jenkins – alto saxophone
- Wade Legge – piano
- Doug Watkins – bass
- Art Taylor – drums

Production

- Bob Weinstock – supervisor
- Rudy Van Gelder – engineer
