= Presenting... Jackie McLean =

Studio album by Jackie McLean
- Released: 1956
- Recorded: October 21, 1955
- Studio: Van Gelder, Hackensack, NJ
- Genre: Jazz
- Length: 40:18
- Label: Ad Lib; 6601

Jackie McLean chronology
Presenting... Jackie McLean (1956)	Lights Out! (1956)

Presenting... Jackie McLean, also referred to as The New Tradition and Jackie McLean Quintet, is the debut album by American alto saxophonist Jackie McLean, which was recorded in 1955, becoming the first LP released by the Ad Lib label before being reissued on the Jubilee label in 1958. It features McLean in a quintet with trumpeter Donald Byrd, pianist Mal Waldron, bassist Doug Watkins and drummer Ron Tucker.

== Reception ==
Professional ratings
Review scores
Source	Rating
AllMusic	3/5 stars
The Penguin Guide to Jazz Recordings	3/4 stars

The AllMusic review by Thom Jurek said: "A standard late bebop and early hard bop date (but then again, hard bop was still fresh and new at the time, and McLean was at the forefront of it), the album is most notable for its two McLean originals". Reviewing a CD reissue Alex Henderson said "Although far from essential, The New Tradition is a decent bop outing that will appeal to collectors, historians, and hardcore fans".

== Track listing ==
All compositions by Jackie McLean, except where indicated.

1. "It's You or No One" (Jule Styne, Sammy Cahn) – 6:51
2. "Blue Doll" – 7:00
3. "Little Melonae" – 6:27
4. "The Way You Look Tonight" (Jerome Kern, Dorothy Fields) – 6:30
5. "Mood Malody" (Mal Waldron) – 6:53
6. "Lover Man" (Jimmy Davis, Ram Ramirez, James Sherman) – 6:37

== Personnel ==
- Jackie McLean – alto saxophone
- Donald Byrd – trumpet
- Mal Waldron – piano
- Doug Watkins – bass
- Ronald Tucker – drums
