= Swing, Swang, Swingin' =

Studio album by Jackie McLean
- Released: March 28, 1960
- Recorded: October 20, 1959
- Studio: Van Gelder; Englewood Cliffs, New Jersey
- Genre: Jazz
- Length: 38:13
- Label: Blue Note; BLP 4024
- Producer: Alfred Lion

Jackie McLean chronology
New Soil (1959)	Swing, Swang, Swingin' (1960)	Capuchin Swing (1960)

Swing, Swang, Swingin' is an album by American saxophonist Jackie McLean, recorded in 1959 and released on the Blue Note label. McLean's quartet features rhythm section Walter Bishop Jr., Jimmy Garrison and Art Taylor.

== Reception ==
Professional ratings
Review scores
Source	Rating
AllMusic	4/5 stars
DownBeat	3.5/5 stars
The Penguin Guide to Jazz Recordings	3/4 stars

The AllMusic review by Steve Huey states, "Perhaps as a result of Blue Note's more prepared, professional approach to recording sessions, McLean sounds invigorated here, catapulting each melody forward before launching into a series of impassioned improvisations... Swing, Swang, Swingin' may not be as groundbreaking as McLean's more modernist work, but it's a solid session from an artist just beginning an incredible hot streak."

== Track listing ==
All compositions by Jackie McLean, except as indicated

Side 1

1. "What's New?" (Burke, Haggart) – 5:19
2. "Let's Face the Music and Dance" (Berlin) – 4:51
3. "Stablemates" (Golson) – 5:47
4. "I Remember You" (Mercer, Victor Schertzinger) – 5:16

Side 2

1. "I Love You" (Porter) – 5:10
2. "I'll Take Romance" (Oscar Hammerstein II, Oakland) – 5:49
3. "116th and Lenox" – 6:01

== Personnel ==
Musicians

- Jackie McLean – alto saxophone
- Walter Bishop Jr. – piano
- Jimmy Garrison – bass
- Art Taylor – drums

Technical personnel

- Alfred Lion – production
- Rudy Van Gelder – recording engineer, mastering
- Reid Miles – design
- Francis Wolff – photography
- Ira Gitler – liner notes
