= Jammin' with Gene =

Studio album by Gene Ammons
- Released: 1956
- Recorded: July 13, 1956
- Studio: Van Gelder Studio, Hackensack, New Jersey
- Genre: Jazz
- Length: 40:21
- Label: Prestige; PRLP 7060

Gene Ammons chronology
The Happy Blues (1956)	Jammin' with Gene (1956)	Funky (1957)

Jammin' with Gene is an album by saxophonist Gene Ammons recorded in 1956 and released on the Prestige label.

== Reception ==
Professional ratings
Review scores
Source	Rating
Allmusic	4/5 stars
DownBeat	3/5 stars
The Rolling Stone Jazz Record Guide	4/5 stars
The Penguin Guide to Jazz Recordings	2.5/4 stars

The AllMusic review by Scott Yanow stated: "this is an excellent (and rather spontaneous) straightahead session".

== Track listing ==
1. "Jammin' With Gene" (Gene Ammons) - 14:15
2. "We'll Be Together Again" (Carl T. Fischer, Frankie Laine) - 10:00
3. "Not Really the Blues" (Johnny Mandel) - 16:06

== Personnel ==
- Gene Ammons - tenor saxophone
- Donald Byrd, Art Farmer - trumpet
- Jackie McLean - alto saxophone
- Mal Waldron - piano
- Doug Watkins - bass
- Art Taylor - drums
