= Art Taylor =

American jazz drummer (1929–1995)

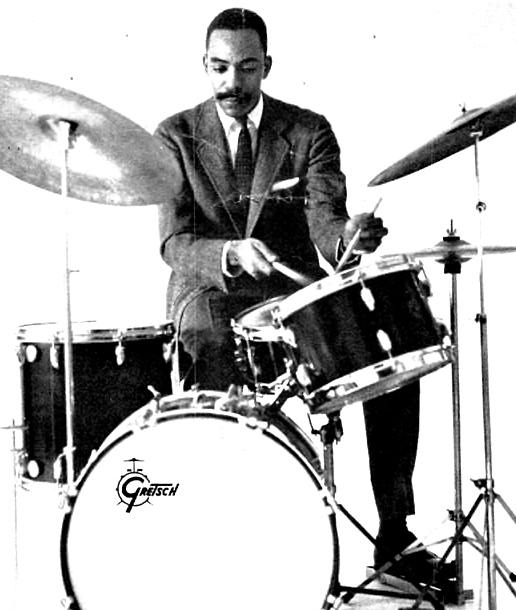
- Taylor in a 1963 advertisement for Gretsch

Background information
- Born: Arthur S. Taylor Jr. April 6, 1929; New York City, US
- Died: February 6, 1995 (aged 65) Manhattan, New York City, US
- Genre: Jazz
- Occupations: Musician, composer
- Instrument: Drums

Arthur S. Taylor Jr. (April 6, 1929 – February 6, 1995) was an American jazz drummer, who "helped define the sound of modern jazz drumming".

== Early life ==
Born in New York City, Taylor grew up in the Sugar Hill section of Harlem, Manhattan. He was often nicknamed A.T. or Mr. Cool with those who knew him well.

== Career ==
As a teenager, Taylor first decided that he wanted to become a musician after hearing Sid Catlett play at a jam session at the current site of the Lincoln Center. He joined a local Harlem band that featured Sonny Rollins, Jackie McLean and Kenny Drew. After playing in the bands of Howard McGhee (1948), Coleman Hawkins (1950–51), Buddy DeFranco (1952), Bud Powell (1953–58; 1961; 1964), George Wallington and Art Farmer (1954), Wallington again (1954–55), Gigi Gryce and Donald Byrd (1956), he formed his own group, Taylor's Wailers. Between 1957 and 1963, he toured with Donald Byrd, recorded with Miles Davis, Gene Ammons and John Coltrane, and performed with Thelonious Monk; Taylor also was a member of the original Kenny Dorham Quartet of 1957.

=== 1956-1962: Taylor's Wailers ===
Taylor formed his own group in 1956, the Taylor's Wailers. They recorded their debut album Taylor's Wailers in 1957, at the Van Gelder Studio in Hackensack, New Jersey, with musicians Donald Byrd (trumpeter), Jackie McLean (altoist), Charlie Rouse (tenor), Ray Bryant (pianist), and Wendel Marshall (bassist). Their album featured modern hard bop and multiple swinging sessions. Two notable tracks, "Well, You Needn't" and "Off Minor", are compositions of Thelonious Monk. Other tracks include "C.T.A" which featured artists such as John Coltrane, Red Garland and Paul Chambers.

=== 1963-1980: Europe ===
In 1963, Taylor moved to Europe, where he lived mainly in France and Belgium for 17 years, playing with local groups and jazz musicians such as Johnny Griffin, John Bodwin, and with travelling American musicians, such as Woody Shaw during the latter's tenure in Paris. Taylor also studied drums in Paris with Kenny Clarke. Having worked for fellow expatriate Powell throughout the 1950s, Taylor once again recorded with him in 1964 for the album The Invisible Cage, at Paris' Studio Acousti.

Taylor was the author of Notes and Tones, a 1977 book based on his interviews with other musicians. This was, for many musicians, a ground-breaking work, because it presented the interviewees' perspectives on the wider social, political, and economic forces in which they operated – topics normally not mentioned in mainstream coverage of jazz musicians. Da Capo Press has released an extended edition of his book which features in-depth interviews of jazz musicians such as Miles Davis, Sonny Rollins, Thelonious Monk, Ornette Coleman and Dizzy Gillespie. Additionally, Taylor shares that his book had helped him put him on the "right track". Since writing his book, people assumed that he could not play well anymore, which only reignited the fire in himself to play better than he ever had in his life.

=== 1980-1995: Return to the U.S. ===
He returned to the United States to help his mother, who was ill. He continued freelancing after returning to the United States.

In 1991 he organized a second band called Taylor's Wailers. In 1992, his group released albums such as Mr. A.T. and a live album called Wailin’ At The Vanguard recorded in New York City at the Village Vanguard and was his final recording as a leader.

In 1995 Taylor's last recording session was with Jimmy Smith on the album Damn! which was dedicated in his memory.

== Style and influences ==
Taylor was originally influenced by American drummer J. C. Heard, who had "solidified his vision in becoming a drummer". In a 1994 interview with Modern Drummer magazine he shared childhood memories of his father taking him to the Apollo Theatre, to see J.C. Heard and other artists such as Duke Ellington, Count Basie, Buddy Rich and Charlie Barnet. Other influential names in his lifetime included Sid Catlett, Philly Joe Jones, Tony Williams, Elvin Jones, and Kenny Clarke who had encouraged him to study music.

Taylor also revealed in a 1994 voice recording interview by NPR that he first studied drums in Paris with Kenny Clarke. He explained that he was self-trained, but felt encouraged by Clarke to continue studying music. He states "Kenny always tried to encourage me… He said you're gonna be better, you're gonna be better... ".

While Kenny Clarke is regarded as one of the larger influences from his time in France, Taylor noted that Art Blakey and Max Roach were his most important influences on his personal style of jazz. He expresses his admiration for the technique and control of Roach's playing, the finesse of Philly Joe and the power of Blakey. “I took something from all those people. I know I have, because when I hear a drummer play something I like, I learn to play. After playing it for a long time, it isn't like something you stole from somebody else. It becomes almost your own, because you sure can't play it like anybody else did... ".

His rhythmic conception is also influenced by Bud Powell’s piano rhythms, which he incorporates into his drum playing. Their collaboration can be heard also in Powell's live recording Birdland 1953: The Complete Trio Recording; pieces performed live included "Moose the Mooche", "Cheryl", "Budo", and "Un Poco Loco" featuring Taylor as the drummer. He can also be heard in John Coltrane’s album Giant Steps and Miles Davis's Miles Ahead, expanding his horizon as a collaborative artist.

Taylor mentions a few students he took under his wing, from places such as Germany, Australia, and Japan, and would come into the United States once a year and take multiple lessons. Taylor emphasized the importance of playing the bass drum on every beat of the song to become a better drummer and build a foundation for other musicians to play on.

== Death ==
He died aged 65 in Beth Israel Hospital, Manhattan, in 1995.

== Legacy ==
Art Taylor was known to be one of the greatest drummers of the 1950s but worked primarily as a sideman, recording 323 sessions. Coltrane described how he hired Taylor to record with him because Taylor's playing "doesn't interfere with his".

Whether playing with Johnny Griffin, Jackie McLean, Dexter Gordon or Coleman Hawkins, Taylor paid careful attention to the individual's sound and tone. When practicing to perform, he noted that he regarded himself as a "slow learner" compared to other drummers, but had "kept learning". He valued the importance of learning a section, or arrangement, permanently, helping his members play their sections when needed. Taylor's ability to adapt and play "with" the musician's playing style, rather than "at" them, was another one of his values.

== Discography ==
=== As leader ===
- Taylor's Wailers (Prestige, 1957)
- Taylor's Tenors (Prestige, 1959)
- A.T.'s Delight (Blue Note, 1961)
- Mr. A.T. (Enja, 1992)
- Wailin' at the Vanguard (Verve, 1993)

=== As sideman ===
With Arnett Cobb

- Party Time (Prestige, 1959)
- More Party Time (Prestige, 1960)
- Movin' Right Along (Prestige, 1960)

With Art Farmer

- The Art Farmer Septet (Prestige, 1953–54)
- When Farmer Met Gryce (Prestige, 1955) – with Gigi Gryce

With Bennie Green

- Hornful of Soul (Bethlehem, 1960)

With Benny Bailey

- Big Brass (Candid, 1960)

With Benny Golson

- Gettin' with It (New Jazz, 1959)
- Free (Argo, 1962)

With Buddy DeFranco

- King of the Clarinet (MGM, 1953)

With Bud Powell

- The Amazing Bud Powell, Vol. 2 (Blue Note, 1954)
- Bud Powell Trio (Roost, 1953)
- Bud Powell's Moods (Verve, 1954)
- The Lonely One... (Verve, 1955)
- Piano Interpretations by Bud Powell (Verve, 1955)
- Strictly Powell (RCA, 1956)
- Swingin' with Bud (RCA, 1956)
- Bud Plays Bird (Blue Note, 1957)
- Bud! The Amazing Bud Powell (Vol. 3) (Blue Note, 1957)
- The Scene Changes: The Amazing Bud Powell (Vol. 5) (Blue Note, 1958)
- Live at Birdland (Queen-disk, recorded 1953)
- Three Nights at Birdland (SSJ, 2017; recorded 1953)

With Buddy Tate

- Tate-a-Tate (Swingville, 1960) with Clark Terry

With Cecil Payne

- Patterns of Jazz (Savoy, 1956)

With Charlie Rouse

- Takin' Care of Business (Jazzland, 1960)

With Chris Anderson

- My Romance (Vee-Jay, 1960 [1983])

With Clark Terry

- Top and Bottom Brass (Riverside, 1959)

With Clifford Jordan

- Cliff Jordan (Blue Note, 1957)

With Continuum

- Mad About Tadd (1980, Palo Alto Records)

With Dexter Gordon

- One Flight Up (Blue Note, 1964)
- The Squirrel (Blue Note, 1967 [1997])
- A Day in Copenhagen (MPS, 1969) – with Slide Hampton

With Dizzy Reece

- Blues in Trinity (Blue Note, 1958)

With Donald Byrd

- 2 Trumpets (Prestige, 1956) – with Art Farmer
- Jazz Eyes (Regent, 1957) – with John Jenkins
- Off to the Races (Blue Note, 1958)
- Byrd in Hand (Blue Note, 1959)

With Dorothy Ashby

- In a Minor Groove (New Jazz, 1958)
- Hip Harp (Prestige, 1958)

With Duke Jordan

- Flight to Jordan (Blue Note, 1960)

With Eddie "Lockjaw" Davis

- Goin' to the Meeting (Prestige, 1962)

With Elmo Hope and Frank Foster

- Hope Meets Foster (Prestige, 1955)

With Ernie Henry

- Presenting Ernie Henry (Riverside, 1956)

With Gene Ammons

- The Happy Blues (Prestige, 1956)
- Jammin' with Gene (Prestige, 1956)
- Funky (Prestige, 1957)
- Jammin' in Hi Fi with Gene Ammons (Prestige, 1957)
- The Big Sound (Prestige, 1958)
- Groove Blues (Prestige, 1958)
- Blue Gene (Prestige, 1958)
- Boss Tenor (Prestige, 1960)
- Velvet Soul (Prestige, 1960 [1964])
- Angel Eyes (Prestige, 1960 [1965])
- Up Tight! (Prestige, 1961)
- Boss Soul! (Prestige, 1961)

With Gigi Gryce

- Jazz Lab (Columbia, 1957) – with Donald Byrd
- Gigi Gryce and the Jazz Lab Quintet (Riverside, 1957)
- Modern Jazz Perspective (Columbia, 1957) – with Donald Byrd
- New Formulas from the Jazz Lab (RCA Victor, 1957) with Donald Byrd
- Jazz Lab (Jubilee, 1958) with Donald Byrd
- Doin' the Gigi (Uptown, 2011)

With Hampton Hawes

- Spanish Steps (Black Lion, 1968)

With Horace Silver

- Silver's Blue (Columbia, 1956)

With Idrees Sulieman, Webster Young, John Coltrane, and Bobby Jaspar

- Interplay for 2 Trumpets and 2 Tenors (Prestige, 1957)

With Jackie McLean

- Lights Out! (Prestige, 1956)
- 4, 5 and 6 (Prestige, 1956)
- Jackie McLean & Co. (Prestige, 1957)
- Alto Madness (Prestige, 1957)
- McLean's Scene (New Jazz, 1959)
- Swing, Swang, Swingin' (Blue Note, 1960)
- Makin' the Changes (Prestige, 1960)
- Capuchin Swing (Blue Note, 1960)
- A Long Drink of the Blues (New Jazz, 1961)
- Strange Blues (Prestige, 1967)
- Street Singer (album) (Blues Note, 1980)
- Back to the Tracks (Blue Note, 1998)

With James Clay

- The Sound of the Wide Open Spaces!!!! (Riverside, 1960) – with David "Fathead" Newman

With Jimmy Cleveland

- A Map of Jimmy Cleveland (Mercury, 1959)

With Jimmy Smith

- Damn! (Verve, 1995)

With John Coltrane

- Wheelin' & Dealin' (Prestige, 1957)
- Traneing In (Prestige, 1958)
- Soultrane (Prestige, 1958)
- Giant Steps (Atlantic, 1960)
- Lush Life (Prestige, 1961)
- Settin' the Pace (Prestige, 1961)
- Bahia (1964)
- The Believer (Prestige, 1964)
- Black Pearls (Prestige, 1964)
- The Last Trane (Prestige, 1966)
- Alternate Takes (Atlantic, 1975)
- Trane's Blues (Blue Note, 1999)

With Johnny Griffin

- Do Nothing 'til You Hear from Me (Riverside, 1963)

With Johnny Griffin and Eddie "Lockjaw" Davis

- Ow! Live at the Penthouse (Cellar Live, 2019)

With Johnny "Hammond" Smith

- Talk That Talk (New Jazz, 1960)
- Open House (Riverside, 1963)

With Julian Priester

- Spiritsville (Jazzland, 1960)

With Julius Watkins and Charlie Rouse

- Les Jazz Modes (Dawn, 1957)

With Kai Winding & J. J. Johnson

- The Great Kai & J. J. (Impulse!, 1960)

With Frank Wright

- Uhuru na Umoja (America, 1970)

With Kenny Burrell

- All Night Long (Prestige, 1956)
- All Day Long (Prestige, 1957)
- 2 Guitars – with Jimmy Raney (Prestige, 1957)
- Just Wailin' (New Jazz, 1958) with Herbie Mann, Charlie Rouse and Mal Waldron

With Kenny Dorham

- Show Boat (1960)

With Lee Morgan

- Introducing Lee Morgan (1956)
- City Lights (Blue Note, 1957)
- Candy (Blue Note, 1957)

With Lem Winchester

- Winchester Special (New Jazz, 1959)
- Lem's Beat (New Jazz, 1960)

With Louis Smith

- Here Comes Louis Smith (Blue Note, 1958)

With Ken McIntyre

- Looking Ahead (New Jazz, 1960) with Eric Dolphy

With Mal Waldron

- Mal-2 (Prestige, 1957)
- The Dealers (Status, 1964)

With Matthew Gee

- Jazz by Gee (Riverside, 1956)

With Miles Davis

- Quintet/Sextet (Prestige, 1956)
- Collectors' Items (Prestige, 1956)
- Miles Ahead (Columbia, 1957)

With Milt Jackson

- Bags & Flutes (Atlantic, 1957)

With Noah Howard

- Space Dimension (America, 1971)

With Oliver Nelson

- Meet Oliver Nelson (New Jazz, 1959)

With Pepper Adams, et al.

- Baritones and French Horns (Prestige, 1958)

With Paul Chambers

- Bass on Top (Blue Note, 1957)

With Red Garland

- A Garland of Red (Prestige, 1956)
- Red Garland Revisited! (Prestige, 1957 [1969])
- The P.C. Blues (Prestige 1956–57 [1970])
- Red Garland's Piano (Prestige, 1956–57)
- Groovy (Prestige, 1956–57)
- All Mornin' Long (Prestige, 1957)
- Soul Junction (Prestige, 1957)
- John Coltrane with the Red Garland Trio (Prestige, 1958)
- Manteca (Prestige, 1958)
- Red in Blues-ville(Prestige, 1959)
- High Pressure (Prestige, 1957 [1962])
- The Red Garland Trio (Moodsville, 1958 [1960])
- All Kinds of Weather (Prestige, 1958)
- The Red Garland Trio + Eddie "Lockjaw" Davis (Moodsville, 1959)
- Halleloo-Y'-All (Prestige, 1960)

With Sahib Shihab

- Jazz Sahib (Savoy, 1957)

With Sonny Clark

- Sonny's Crib (Blue Note, 1957)

With Sonny Stitt

- Stitt Meets Brother Jack (Prestige, 1962) – with Jack McDuff

With Thad Jones

- After Hours (Prestige, 1957)

With Thelonious Monk

- Thelonious Monk and Sonny Rollins (Prestige, 1956)
- The Thelonious Monk Orchestra at Town Hall (Riverside, 1956)
- 5 by Monk by 5 (Riverside, 1959)

With Tiny Grimes

- Tiny in Swingville (Swingville, 1959) – with Jerome Richardson

With Tommy Flanagan

- Thelonica (Enja, 1982)

With Toots Thielmans

- Man Bites Harmonica! (Riverside, 1957)

With Randy Weston

- African Cookbook (Polydor [France], 1969)
- Niles Littlebig (Polydor [France], 1969)

With Stanley Turrentine

- ZT's Blues (Blue Note, 1985)

With Steve Grossman

- In New York (Steve Grossman album) (Dreyfus, 1991)

With Walter Davis Jr.

- Davis Cup (1960)

With Wilbur Harden and John Coltrane

- Jazz Way Out (Savoy, 1958)

== Bibliography ==
- Taylor, Art (1993). Notes and Tones: Musician-to-Musician Interviews. New York: Da Capo Press. ISBN 030680526X. OCLC 28214069.
