= 4, 5 and 6 =

Studio album by Jackie McLean
- Released: November 1956
- Recorded: July 13 & 20, 1956
- Studio: Van Gelder, Hackensack
- Genre: Jazz, hard bop
- Length: 45:18
- Label: Prestige; PRLP 7048
- Producer: Bob Weinstock

Jackie McLean chronology
Lights Out! (1956)	4, 5 and 6 (1956)	Jackie's Pal (1956)

Alternative cover
- 1962 New Jazz LP (NJ 8279)

Professional ratings
Review scores
Source	Rating
AllMusic	4/5 stars
The Penguin Guide to Jazz Recordings	3/4 stars
The Rolling Stone Jazz Record Guide	4/5 stars

4, 5 and 6 is a studio album by saxophonist Jackie McLean recorded for Prestige Records. It was recorded in 1956 and released that year as PRLP 7048. In 1962, the album was reissued under the same title on the Prestige sub-label New Jazz Records as NJ 8279 with a different cover. The album was reissued on CD in 1991. It features McLean in a quartet with pianist Mal Waldron, bassist Doug Watkins and drummer Art Taylor. Trumpeter Donald Byrd guests on three tracks, and tenor saxophonist Hank Mobley on one.

== Track listing ==
No.	Title	Writer(s)	Length
1.	"Sentimental Journey"	Ben Homer, Bud Green, Les Brown	10:00
2.	"Why Was I Born?"	Jerome Kern, Oscar Hammerstein II	5:16
3.	"Contour"	Kenny Drew	5:01
4.	"Confirmation"	Charlie Parker	11:26
5.	"When I Fall in Love"	Edward Heyman, Victor Young	5:36
6.	"Abstraction"	Mal Waldron	7:59

Recorded on July 13 (#1–3) and 20 (#4–6), 1956.

== Personnel ==
- Jackie McLean – alto sax
- Hank Mobley – tenor sax (#4 only)
- Donald Byrd – trumpet (#3, 4, 6 only)
- Mal Waldron – piano
- Doug Watkins – bass
- Art Taylor – drums
