= Byrd in Hand =

Studio album by Donald Byrd
- Released: 1959
- Recorded: May 31, 1959
- Studio: Van Gelder Studio; Hackensack, New Jersey
- Genre: Hard bop
- Length: 39:54
- Label: Blue Note; BLP 4019
- Producer: Alfred Lion

Donald Byrd chronology
Off to the Races (1958)	Byrd in Hand (1959)	Fuego (1959)

Professional ratings
Review scores
Source	Rating
AllMusic	4.5/5 stars
DownBeat	5/5 stars
The Penguin Guide to Jazz	3/4 stars

Byrd in Hand is an album by American jazz trumpeter Donald Byrd recorded on May 31, 1959 and released on Blue Note later that year.

== Reception ==
The Penguin Guide to Jazz described the recording as a "typical Blue Note blowing session".

The AllMusic reviewer wrote that "Although none of the new tunes caught on, the group [...] plays consistently creative and spirited solos in the hard bop idiom."

== Track listing ==
All compositions by Donald Byrd, except as noted.

=== Side 1 ===
1. "Witchcraft" (Cy Coleman, Carolyn Leigh) – 8:29
2. "Here Am I" – 8:25
3. "Devil Whip" – 4:42

=== Side 2 ===
1. "Bronze Dance" (Walter Davis, Jr.) – 6:42
2. "Clarion Calls" (Walter Davis, Jr.) – 5:41
3. "The Injuns" – 6:13

== Personnel ==
=== Musicians ===
- Donald Byrd – trumpet
- Charlie Rouse – tenor saxophone
- Pepper Adams – baritone saxophone
- Walter Davis Jr. – piano
- Sam Jones – bass
- Art Taylor – drums

=== Technical personnel ===
- Alfred Lion – production
- Rudy Van Gelder – recording engineer, mastering
- Reid Miles – design
- Francis Wolff – photography
- Ira Gitler – liner notes
