= Strange Blues =

Studio album by Jackie McLean
- Released: 1967
- Recorded: February 15 & July 12, 1957
- Studio: Van Gelder, Hackensack, New Jersey
- Genre: Jazz
- Length: 37:15
- Label: Prestige; PR 7500
- Producer: Don Schlitten

Jackie McLean chronology
A Long Drink of the Blues (1957)	Strange Blues (1967)	Alto Madness (1957)

Strange Blues is an album by American saxophonist Jackie McLean, recorded in 1957 and released on the Prestige label. It features three tracks with McLean in a quartet featuring pianist Jon Mayer, bassist Bill Salter and drummer Larry Ritchie, one with a quartet featuring pianist Mal Waldron, bassist Art Phipps and drummer Art Taylor and one with a quartet featuring pianist Gil Coggins, bassist Paul Chambers and drummer Louis Hayes. Trumpeter Webster Young and tuba player Ray Draper appear together on two tracks.

== Reception ==
The AllMusic review by Scott Yanow called the album "a generally strong set chiefly recommended to Jackie McLean completists."

Professional ratings
Review scores
Source	Rating
AllMusic	4/5 stars
The Penguin Guide to Jazz Recordings	3/4 stars
The Rolling Stone Jazz Record Guide	2/5 stars

== Track listing ==
All compositions by Jackie McLean, except as indicated

1. "Strange Blues" – 7:32
2. "Millie's Pad" (Webster Young) – 11:15
3. "What's New?" (Johnny Burke, Bob Haggart) – 6:35
4. "Disciples Love Affair" (Ray Draper) – 6:49
5. "Not So Strange Blues" – 4:49
- Recorded at Van Gelder Studio, Hackensack, New Jersey, on February 15 (track 1), July 12 (tracks 2, 4 & 5), and August 30 (track 3), 1957

== Personnel ==
- Jackie McLean – alto saxophone
- Webster Young – trumpet (tracks 2 & 4)
- Ray Draper – tuba (tracks 2 & 4)
- Gil Coggins (track 3), Jon Mayer (tracks 2, 4 & 5), Mal Waldron (track 1) – piano
- Paul Chambers (track 3), Art Phipps (track 1), Bill Salter (tracks 2, 4 & 5) – bass
- Louis Hayes (track 3), Art Taylor (track 1), Larry Ritchie (tracks 2, 4 & 5) – drums
