= Funky (Gene Ammons album) =

Studio album by Gene Ammons
- Released: 1957
- Recorded: January 11, 1957; Van Gelder Studio, Hackensack, New Jersey
- Genre: Jazz
- Length: 39:24
- Label: Prestige; PRLP 7083
- Producer: Bob Weinstock

Gene Ammons chronology
Jammin' with Gene (1956)	Funky (1957)	Jammin' in Hi Fi with Gene Ammons (1957)

Funky is an album by saxophonist Gene Ammons recorded in 1957 and released on the Prestige label.

== Reception ==
AllMusic reviewer Scott Yanow stated: "The Gene Ammons all-star jam session recordings of the 1950s are all quite enjoyable and this one is no exception... Ammons seems to really inspire his sidemen on these soulful bop jams".

Professional ratings
Review scores
Source	Rating
Allmusic	4/5 stars
The Penguin Guide to Jazz Recordings	3/4 stars

== Track listing ==
1. "Funky" (Kenny Burrell) - 9:01
2. "Pint Size" (Jimmy Mundy) - 12:23
3. "Stella by Starlight" (Ned Washington, Victor Young) - 8:57
4. "King Size" (Mundy) - 9:16

== Personnel ==
- Gene Ammons - tenor saxophone
- Art Farmer - trumpet
- Jackie McLean - alto saxophone
- Mal Waldron - piano
- Kenny Burrell - guitar
- Doug Watkins - bass
- Art Taylor - drums
