= Tuba Sounds =

Studio album by Ray Draper
- Released: 1957
- Recorded: March 15, 1957
- Studio: Van Gelder Studio, Hackensack, New Jersey
- Genre: Jazz
- Length: 37:16
- Label: Prestige; PRLP 7096
- Producer: Bob Weinstock

Ray Draper chronology
Tuba Sounds (1957)	The Ray Draper Quintet featuring John Coltrane (1957)

Tuba Sounds is the debut album by tuba player Ray Draper recorded in 1957 and released on the Prestige label.

== Reception ==
Professional ratings
Review scores
Source	Rating
Allmusic	4/5 stars
The Penguin Guide to Jazz Recordings	3/4 stars

Scott Yanow of Allmusic reviewed the album, stating: "His solos are sometimes a touch awkward rhythmically and it takes one a little while to get used to his sound in this setting but, overall, this is a successful effort". The Penguin Guide to Jazz Recordings describes the album as “an impressive debut” for Draper, who was only 16 when it was recorded.

== Track listing ==
All compositions by Ray Draper except as indicated

1. "Terry Anne" (Webster Young) - 6:39
2. "You're My Thrill" (Sidney Clare, Jay Gorney) - 6:48
3. "Pivot" (Mal Waldron) - 5:13
4. "Jackie's Dolly" - 4:54
5. "Mimi's Interlude" - 8:14
6. "House of Davis" (Webster Young) - 5:28

== Personnel ==
- Ray Draper - tuba
- Webster Young - trumpet
- Jackie McLean - alto saxophone
- Mal Waldron - piano
- Spanky DeBrest - bass
- Ben Dixon - drums

=== Production ===
- Bob Weinstock - supervisor
- Rudy Van Gelder - engineer
