= Jammin' in Hi Fi with Gene Ammons =

Studio album by Gene Ammons
- Released: 1957
- Recorded: April 12, 1957
- Studio: Van Gelder Studio, Hackensack, New Jersey
- Genre: Jazz
- Length: 50:12
- Label: Prestige; PRLP 7110
- Producer: Bob Weinstock

Gene Ammons chronology
Funky (1957)	Jammin' in Hi Fi with Gene Ammons (1957)	The Big Sound (1958)

Jammin' in Hi Fi with Gene Ammons (also rereleased as The Twister) is an album by saxophonist Gene Ammons recorded in 1957 and released on the Prestige label.

== Reception ==
Professional ratings
Review scores
Source	Rating
Allmusic	4/5 stars
The Rolling Stone Jazz Record Guide	4/5 stars
The Penguin Guide to Jazz Recordings	2/4 stars

Allmusic reviewer Scott Yanow stated: "Tenorman Gene Ammons headed a series of notable studio jam session in the 1950s and this is one of the better ones... The results are an accessible and often exciting brand of bebop".

== Track listing ==
1. "The Twister" (Mal Waldron) - 12:15
2. "Four" (Miles Davis) - 13:02
3. "Pennies from Heaven" (Johnny Burke, Arthur Johnston) - 13:02
4. "Cattin'" (Waldron) - 11:58

== Personnel ==
- Gene Ammons - tenor saxophone
- Idrees Sulieman - trumpet
- Jackie McLean - alto saxophone
- Mal Waldron - piano
- Kenny Burrell - guitar
- Paul Chambers - bass
- Art Taylor - drums
