= New Soil =

Studio album by Jackie McLean
- Released: August 1959
- Recorded: May 2, 1959
- Studio: Van Gelder; Hackensack, New Jersey
- Genre: Jazz
- Length: 38:31 (LP); 44:47 (CD)
- Label: Blue Note; BLP 4013
- Producer: Alfred Lion

Jackie McLean chronology
Fat Jazz (1959)	New Soil (1959)	Swing, Swang, Swingin' (1959)

New Soil is an album by American jazz saxophonist Jackie McLean, recorded on May 2, 1959, and released on Blue Note later that year. McLean's quintet features trumpeter Donald Byrd and rhythm section Walter Davis Jr., Paul Chambers and Pete La Roca.

== Reception ==
Professional ratings
Review scores
Source	Rating
AllMusic	4.5/5 stars
The Encyclopedia of Popular Music	5/5 stars
The Penguin Guide to Jazz Recordings	4/4 stars

The AllMusic review by Steve Huey states, "New Soil wasn't the first session Jackie McLean recorded for Blue Note, but it was the first one released, and as the title suggests, the first glimmerings of McLean's desire to push beyond the limits of bop are already apparent... It could be argued that McLean never recorded a bad album for Blue Note, and New Soil got his career with the label off to a terrifically stimulating start."

== Track listing ==
All compositions by Walter Davis Jr., except as noted.

Side 1

1. "Hip Strut" (Jackie McLean) – 11:20
2. "Minor Apprehension" (McLean) – 7:34

Side 2

1. "Greasy" – 7:25
2. "Sweet Cakes" – 6:46
3. "Davis Cup" – 5:26

1988 CD reissue bonus track

6. "Formidable" – 6:16

== Personnel ==
Musicians

- Jackie McLean – alto saxophone
- Donald Byrd – trumpet
- Walter Davis Jr. – piano
- Paul Chambers – bass
- Pete LaRoca – drums

Technical personnel

- Alfred Lion – producer
- Rudy Van Gelder – recording engineer, mastering
- Reid Miles – design
- Francis Wolff – photography
- Joe Goldberg – liner notes
