= Lights Out! =

Studio album by Jackie McLean
- Released: June 1956
- Recorded: January 27, 1956
- Studio: Van Gelder, Hackensack, New Jersey
- Genre: Jazz
- Length: 45:58
- Label: Prestige; PRLP 7035
- Producer: Bob Weinstock

Jackie McLean chronology
Presenting... Jackie McLean (1955)	Lights Out! (1956)	4, 5 and 6 (1956)

Professional ratings
Review scores
Source	Rating
AllMusic	4/5 stars
Disc	4/5 stars
DownBeat	3.5/5 stars
The Penguin Guide to Jazz Recordings	3.5/4 stars
The Rolling Stone Jazz Record Guide	3/5 stars

Lights Out! is a studio album by saxophonist Jackie McLean, his debut on Prestige Records. It was recorded in 1956 and released the same year as PRLP 7035. The album was reissued on CD in 1990 (as Original Jazz Classics OJCCD-426-2/Prestige P-7035). It was re-issued on 180 gram vinyl by Analogue Productions in 2012. It features McLean in a quintet with trumpeter Donald Byrd, pianist Elmo Hope, bassist Doug Watkins and drummer Art Taylor.

== Track listing ==
1. "Lights Out" (Jackie McLean) – 13:00
2. "Up" (McLean) – 4:47
3. "Lorraine" (Donald Byrd) – 6:26
4. "A Foggy Day" (George Gershwin, Ira Gershwin) – 6:24
5. "Kerplunk" (Byrd) – 8:51
6. "Inding" (McLean) – 6:30

== Personnel ==
- Jackie McLean – alto saxophone
- Donald Byrd – trumpet
- Elmo Hope – piano
- Doug Watkins – bass
- Art Taylor – drums
