= Off to the Races (Donald Byrd album) =

Studio album by Donald Byrd
- Released: March 1959
- Recorded: December 21, 1958
- Studio: Van Gelder Studio; Hackensack, New Jersey
- Genre: Jazz
- Length: 36:52
- Label: Blue Note; BLP 4007
- Producer: Alfred Lion

Donald Byrd chronology
Byrd in Paris (1959)	Off to the Races (1959)	Byrd in Hand (1959)

Off to the Races is an album by American jazz trumpeter Donald Byrd recorded on December 21, 1958 and released on Blue Note the following year.

== Reception ==
Professional ratings
Review scores
Source	Rating
AllMusic	4/5 stars

The AllMusic review by Stephen Thomas Erlewine states, "There's nothing surprising about Off to the Races; it's simply a set of well-performed, enjoyable hard bop, but sometimes that's enough."

== Track listing ==
All compositions by Donald Byrd, except as noted.

=== Side 1 ===
1. "Lover, Come Back to Me" (Oscar Hammerstein II, Sigmund Romberg) – 6:52
2. "When Your Lover Has Gone" (Einar Aaron Swan) – 5:04
3. "Sudwest Funk" – 6:53

=== Side 2 ===
1. "Paul's Pal" (Sonny Rollins) – 7:08
2. "Off to the Races" – 6:36
3. "Down Tempo" – 5:19

== Personnel ==
=== Musicians ===
- Donald Byrd – trumpet
- Jackie McLean – alto saxophone (except "When Your Lover Has Gone")
- Pepper Adams – baritone saxophone (except "When Your Lover Has Gone")
- Wynton Kelly – piano
- Sam Jones – bass
- Art Taylor – drums

=== Technical personnel ===
- Alfred Lion – producer
- Rudy Van Gelder – recording engineer
- Reid Miles – design
- Francis Wolff – photography
- Joe Goldberg – liner notes
