= Fuego (Donald Byrd album) =

Album by American jazz trumpeter Donald Byrd

Studio album by Donald Byrd
- Released: July 1960
- Recorded: October 4, 1959
- Studio: Van Gelder Studio; Englewood Cliffs, New Jersey
- Genre: Hard bop
- Length: 40:56
- Label: Blue Note; BLP 4026
- Producer: Alfred Lion

Donald Byrd chronology
Byrd in Hand (1959)	Fuego (1960)	Byrd in Flight (1960)

Fuego is an album by American jazz trumpeter Donald Byrd recorded on October 4, 1959 and released on Blue Note the following year. Byrd's quintet features saxophonist Jackie McLean and rhythm section Duke Pearson, Doug Watkins and Lex Humphries.

Professional ratings
Review scores
Source	Rating
DownBeat	3.5/5 stars
AllMusic	4/5 stars
The Penguin Guide to Jazz	2.5/4 stars
The Rolling Stone Jazz Record Guide	3/5 stars

== Reception ==
The AllMusic review by Michael G. Nastos states, "hard bop is at the core of this band, but Byrd is moving further into post-bop... as he takes a break from forceful interaction to play a more democratic role on this refined and mature album that is less brash, a prelude for his more powerful statements yet to come."

The Penguin Guide to Jazz praised McLean's contributions but criticized the uninteresting compositions.

== Track listing ==
All compositions by Donald Byrd

=== Side 1 ===
1. "Fuego" – 6:38
2. "Bup a Loup" – 4:05
3. "Funky Mama" – 10:58

=== Side 2 ===
1. "Low Life" – 6:02
2. "Lament" – 8:27
3. "Amen" – 4:46

== Personnel ==
=== Musicians ===
- Donald Byrd – pocket trumpet
- Jackie McLean – alto saxophone
- Duke Pearson – piano
- Doug Watkins – bass
- Lex Humphries – drums

=== Technical personnel ===
- Alfred Lion – producer
- Rudy Van Gelder – recording engineer, mastering
- Reid Miles – design
- Francis Wolff – photography
- Leonard Feather – technical personnel
