= Bert Buhrman =

American theater and radio organist

- Born: 1915 Springfield, Missouri, United States
- Died: January 29, 1999
- Occupations: Theater and radio organist

Albert J. Buhrman (1915-January 29, 1999) was an American theater and radio organist, active in New York and Missouri.

== Biography ==
Buhrman was born in Springfield, Missouri, United States. His musical career began at the St. John's Episcopal Church in Springfield. first gained general popularity in New York. In 1936, he was featured in daily radio shows on radio WREN in Lawrence, Kansas. By 1939, he was the musical director of station KCMO. He was the organist for the radio version of Guiding Light. He performed for several radio shows, for both CBS and NBC, and felt his hectic radio schedule, performing for eighteen hours each day of the week, was to blame for mistakenly playing the wrong sponsor's theme on at least one occasion.

In 1957, he released an album on ABC-Paramount Records where he featured the Conn electronic organ from Madison Square Gardens. His 1960 album for Columbia Records featured pipe organ. Citing burnout, he quit performing for radio in 1965. He became the official organist at the College of the Ozarks sometime around 1970. Beginning in 1972 until at least the mid-1980s, he performed an annual fundraising concert at the College of the Ozarks on behalf of that school's scholarship fund. His 1984 performance was so popular that would-be attendees were turned away, even though extra seating with viewing limited to closed-circuit television was opened.

Shortly before his death, Buhrman donated his sheet music collection to the Springfield Greene County Library. This collection consists of more than 5000 pieces of music, with a concentration in the 1930s. Burhman died on January 29, 1999.

== Discography ==
- 1957 - Nostalgia in Hi-Fi (ABC-Paramount 209)
- 1960 - And the Pipes Will Play (Columbia CS 8139)
