= Taylor's Wailers =

Studio album by Art Taylor
- Released: 1957
- Recorded: February 25, 1957 (#1, 3–6); March 22, 1957 (#2); Van Gelder Studio, Hackensack
- Genre: Jazz
- Length: 41:00
- Labels: Prestige; PRLP 7117
- Producer: Bob Weinstock

Art Taylor chronology
Taylor's Wailers (1957)	Taylor's Tenors (1959)

Taylor's Wailers is the debut album by drummer Art Taylor, released in 1957 on Prestige. It features tracks recorded mainly on February 25, 1957, plus a track from a different session featuring John Coltrane on saxophone.

== Reception ==
Professional ratings
Review scores
Source	Rating
AllMusic	4.5/5 stars
MusicHound Jazz	4/5 stars
The Penguin Guide to Jazz Recordings	3/4 stars
The Rolling Stone Jazz & Blues Album Guide	4/5 stars

In a review for AllMusic, Scott Yanow singled out the renditions of Bryant's "Cubano Chant" and Monk's "Off Minor" and "Well, You Needn't" for praise, and wrote: "Bryant is the most mature of the soloists, but the three horn players were already starting to develop their own highly individual sounds."

The authors of The Penguin Guide to Jazz Recordings called the album a "well-cooked hard-bop session," and stated that Taylor's playing is "authoritative, although some of his mannerisms leave him a degree short of the single-minded drive of Art Blakey."

A writer for Billboard noted the music's "open, throbbing swing," and commented: "Rouse and... Byrd are in especially fine form; Taylor, his forceful, tasteful self."

== Track listing ==
1. "Batland" (Lee Sears) – 9:52
2. "C.T.A." (Jimmy Heath) – 4:43
3. "Exhibit A" (Sears) – 6:16
4. "Cubano Chant" (Bryant) – 6:36
5. "Off Minor" (Monk) – 5:38
6. "Well, You Needn't" (Monk) – 7:55

== Personnel ==
Tracks 1, 3–6

- Art Taylor – drums
- Donald Byrd – trumpet
- Jackie McLean – alto sax
- Charlie Rouse – tenor sax
- Ray Bryant – piano
- Wendell Marshall – bass

Track 2

- Art Taylor – drums
- John Coltrane – tenor sax
- Red Garland – piano
- Paul Chambers – bass
