= The Ray Draper Quintet featuring John Coltrane =

Studio album by Ray Draper
- Released: 1958
- Recorded: December 20, 1957
- Studio: Van Gelder Studio, Hackensack, New Jersey
- Genre: Jazz
- Length: 37:16
- Label: New Jazz; NJLP 8228
- Producer: Bob Weinstock

Ray Draper chronology
| Tuba Sounds (1957) | The Ray Draper Quintet featuring John Coltrane (1958) | Like Sonny (1958) |

The Ray Draper Quintet featuring John Coltrane is the second album by tuba player Ray Draper recorded in 1957 and released on the New Jazz label.

== Reception ==
Professional ratings
Review scores
| Source | Rating |
|---|---|
| AllMusic | 4/5 stars |
| The Rolling Stone Jazz Record Guide | 3/5 stars |
| The Penguin Guide to Jazz Recordings | 3/4 stars |

Scott Yanow of AllMusic reviewed the album: "Draper had ambitious dreams of making the tuba a major jazz solo instrument; the tuba/tenor front line is an unusual and generally successful sound... One does admire Draper's courage, and it is a pity that he hardly recorded at all after 1960 because he had strong potential." The All About Jazz review by Douglas Payne stated "Even though Draper's career fizzled after only a few more records, this one is probably the best thing he did on his own."

== Track listing ==
All compositions by Ray Draper except as indicated

1. "Clifford's Kappa" – 9:16
2. "Filidé" – 7:16
3. "Two Sons" – 5:24
4. "Paul's Pal" (Sonny Rollins) – 7:14
5. "Under Paris Skies" (Jean Andre Brun, Kim Gannon, Hubert Giraud) – 7:47
6. "I Hadn't Anyone Till You" (Ray Noble) – 3:05

== Personnel ==
- Ray Draper – tuba
- John Coltrane – tenor saxophone (tracks 1–5)
- Gil Coggins – piano
- Spanky DeBrest – bass
- Larry Ritchie – drums

=== Production ===
- Bob Weinstock – supervisor
- Rudy Van Gelder – engineer
