= Ray Draper =

American jazz tuba player

- Birth name: Raymond Allan Draper
- Born: August 3, 1940; New York City, New York, U.S.
- Died: November 1, 1982 (aged 42); Harlem, New York, U.S.
- Genres: Jazz
- Occupation: Musician
- Instrument: Tuba
- Years active: 1950s–1982

Raymond Allen Draper (August 3, 1940, New York City – November 1, 1982) was an American jazz tuba player.

== Early life and education ==
Draper was born in New York City and attended the Manhattan School of Music in the mid-1950s.

== Career ==
As a leader, he recorded his first album, Tuba Sounds (Prestige 1957), at the age of 16, with a quintet. His second album, The Ray Draper Quintet featuring John Coltrane, was recorded at the age of 17 with slight changes in his quintet, including John Coltrane.

Imprisoned over his drug use, after his release in the late 1960s, Draper formed the first jazz rock fusion band composed of established jazz musicians of the day. This preceded Miles Davis's Bitches Brew, which is normally recognized as the first jazz rock fusion group and recording by two years. Original band members included George Bohanon on trombone, Hadley Caliman on tenor sax, John Duke on upright bass, Paul Lagos on drums and Tom Trujillo on guitar. This band, after its first live performance at Hollywood's Whisky a Go Go - where it shared the bill with Nazz - was offered numerous record deals and booked solid at rock venues for the rest of the year. Paul Lagos went on to tour with John Mayall and was one of the founders of the group Pure Food & Drug Act, featuring Don 'Sugarcane' Harris.

Draper began using heroin again, whereupon the more experienced band members quit, except for the youngest member, guitarist Tom Trujillo and his landlord, Chuck Gooden. This led to a search for new members and hirings that included San Diego trumpeter Don Sleet and Ernie Watts. After two years of searching and many personnel changes, including getting clean from drugs, Draper brought drummer Paul Lagos back, along with saxophonist Richard Aplanalp, trumpeter Phil Wood, and bassist Ron Johnson. This new group was eventually named Red Beans and Rice, named after their favorite meal cooked by Draper's first wife, Cassondra. This group appeared on bills with some of the day's headlining groups including Jimi Hendrix, Chicago Transit Authority, Jethro Tull, and Gil Scott Heron. In a 1970 Billboard, reviewing a Dr. John performance mentioned that "His excellent support included Ray Draper on tuba....".

They went on to record the album produced by Jackie Mills titled Red Beans and Rice Featuring Sparerib Ray Draper on Epic Records. But when the band saw that Draper and his manager Forrest Hamilton had put only Draper's picture on the cover, the whole group quit and Draper was on his own once more. After this, he got hooked back on heroin and he sporadically performed and recorded but he was no longer able to recreate the band sound with other players. He left California and spent a couple years in London before returning to New York in the hopes of becoming clean once again. He remarried and had two children, Kayella and Hakim, with his second wife, Anne, continuing to compose for other musicians. Draper played for a time with Max Roach, as mentioned in the 2004 book, "Drummin' Men": "For a time, the Roach group included a tuba, played by young, talented Ray Draper. The instrument was used both as a rhythmic presence and as part of the front-line sound." In 1982, Draper joined the orchestra of Lionel Hampton.

In 1982, coming out of a bank in Harlem, he was held up by a gang of juveniles. The 13-year-old leader of the gang shot him, after Draper had given him his money. Draper had been clean of drug use and was working on a composition, found in his attaché case upon his death.

== Discography ==
=== As leader ===
- 1957: Tuba Sounds (Prestige)
- 1957: The Ray Draper Quintet featuring John Coltrane (Prestige/New Jazz)
- 1958: A Tuba Jazz (Jubilee), reissued as John Coltrane album, Like Sonny (Roulette, 1990)
- 1968: Red Beans and Rice (Epic)

=== As sideman ===
With Sonny Criss

- Sonny's Dream (Birth of the New Cool) (Prestige, 1968)

With Brother Jack McDuff

- Who Knows What Tomorrow's Gonna Bring? (Blue Note, 1970)

With Jackie McLean

- Jackie McLean & Co. (Prestige, 1957)
- Strange Blues (Prestige, 1957)
- Fat Jazz (Jubilee, 1957)

With Max Roach

- Max Roach + 4 at Newport (EmArcy, 1958)
- Deeds, Not Words (Riverside, 1958)
- Award-Winning Drummer (Time, 1958)

With Archie Shepp

- There's a Trumpet in My Soul (Arista Freedom, 1975)

With Dr. John

- The Sun, Moon & Herbs (Atlantic, 1971)
