= Jackie McLean =

American jazz saxophonist, composer, bandleader, and educator (1931–2006)

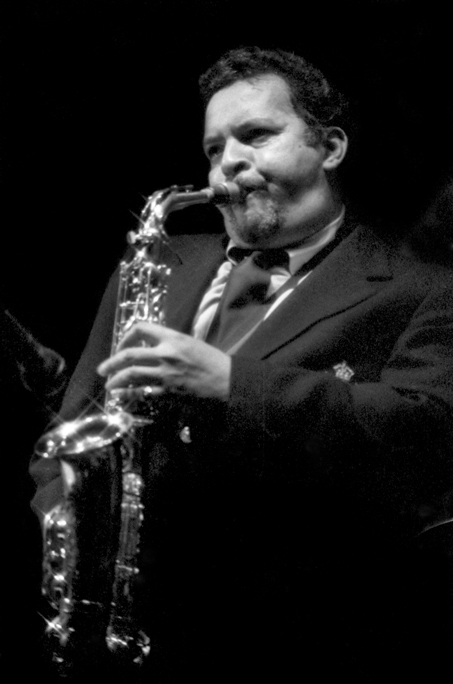
- McLean in 1982

Background information
- Born: John Lenwood McLean; May 17, 1931; New York City, U.S.
- Died: March 31, 2006 (aged 74) Hartford, Connecticut, U.S.
- Genres: Jazz; hard bop; post-bop; jazz fusion; avant-garde jazz
- Occupations: Musician; composer; educator
- Instrument: Alto saxophone
- Years active: 1951–2004

John Lenwood McLean (May 17, 1931 – March 31, 2006) was an American jazz alto saxophonist, composer, bandleader, and educator. He is one of the few musicians to be elected to the DownBeat Hall of Fame in the year of their death.

== Biography ==
McLean was born on May 17, 1931, in Harlem's Sugar Hill sub-neighborhood in New York City. His father, John Sr., played guitar in Tiny Bradshaw's orchestra. After his father's death in 1939, Jackie's musical education was continued by his godfather, his record-store-owning stepfather, and several noted teachers. He also received informal tutoring from neighbors Thelonious Monk, Bud Powell, and Charlie Parker. During high school McLean played in a band with Kenny Drew, Sonny Rollins, and Andy Kirk, Jr. (the saxophonist son of Andy Kirk).

Along with Rollins, McLean featured on Miles Davis's Dig album, recorded in 1951 when McLean was 20 years old. As a young man, he also recorded with Gene Ammons, Charles Mingus (for Pithecanthropus Erectus), George Wallington, and as a member of Art Blakey's Jazz Messengers. McLean joined Blakey after reportedly being punched by Mingus. Fearing for his life, McLean pulled out a knife and contemplated using it against Mingus in self-defense, but later stated he was grateful that he had not stabbed the bassist.

McLean's early recordings as leader were in the hard bop school. He later became an exponent of modal jazz without abandoning his foundation in hard bop. Throughout his career he was known for a distinctive tone, akin to the tenor saxophone and often described with such adjectives as "bittersweet", "piercing", or "searing", a slightly sharp pitch, and a strong foundation in the blues.

McLean was a heroin addict throughout his early career, and the resulting loss of his New York City cabaret card forced him to undertake a large number of recording dates to earn income in the absence of nightclub performance opportunities. Consequently, he produced an extensive body of recorded work in the 1950s and 1960s. He was under contract with Blue Note Records from 1959 to 1967, having previously recorded for Prestige. Blue Note offered better pay and more artistic control than other labels, and his work for this organization is highly regarded and includes leadership and sideman dates with a wide range of musicians, including Donald Byrd, Sonny Clark, Lee Morgan, Ornette Coleman, Dexter Gordon, Freddie Redd, Billy Higgins, Freddie Hubbard, Grachan Moncur III, Bobby Hutcherson, Mal Waldron, Tina Brooks and many others.

In 1962, McLean recorded Let Freedom Ring for Blue Note. This album was the culmination of attempts he had made over the years to deal with harmonic problems in jazz, incorporating ideas from the free jazz developments of Ornette Coleman and the "new breed", which inspired his blending of hard bop with the "new thing": "the search is on, Let Freedom Ring". Let Freedom Ring began a period in which he performed with avant-garde jazz musicians rather than the veteran hard bop performers he had been playing with previously. His adaptation of modal jazz and free jazz innovations to his vision of hard bop made his recordings from 1962 on distinctive.

McLean recorded with dozens of musicians and had a gift for spotting talent. Saxophonist Tina Brooks, trumpeter Charles Tolliver, pianist Larry Willis, trumpeter Bill Hardman, and tubist Ray Draper were among those who benefited from McLean's support in the 1950s and 1960s. Drummers such as Tony Williams, Jack DeJohnette, Lenny White, Michael Carvin, and Carl Allen gained important early experience with McLean.

In 1967, his recording contract, like those of many other progressive musicians, was terminated by Blue Note's new management. His opportunities to record promised so little pay that he abandoned recording as a way to earn a living, concentrating instead on touring. In 1968, he began teaching at The Hartt School of the University of Hartford. He later set up the university's African American Music Department (now the Jackie McLean Institute of Jazz) and its Bachelor of Music degree in Jazz Studies program. His Steeplechase recording New York Calling, made with his son René McLean, showed that by 1980 the assimilation of all influences was complete.

In 1970, he and his wife, Dollie McLean, along with jazz bassist Paul (PB) Brown, founded the Artists Collective, Inc. of Hartford, an organization dedicated to preserving the art and culture of the African Diaspora. It provides educational programs and instruction in dance, theatre, music and visual arts. The membership of McLean's later bands were drawn from his students in Hartford, including Steve Davis and his son René, who is a jazz saxophonist and flautist, as well as a jazz educator. Also in McLean's Hartford group was Mark Berman, the jazz pianist and Broadway conductor of Smokey Joe's Cafe and Rent. In 1979, he reached No. 53 in the UK Singles Chart with "Doctor Jackyll and Mister Funk". This track, released on RCA as a 12" single, was an unusual sidestep for McLean to contribute towards the funk/disco revolution of the late 1970s. Many people, at the time, in the clubs where it was played confused the female singers on the track with his name, thinking he was actually female.

He received an American Jazz Masters fellowship from the National Endowment for the Arts in 2001 and numerous other national and international awards. McLean was the only American jazz musician to found a department of studies at a university and a community-based organization almost simultaneously. Each has existed for over three decades.

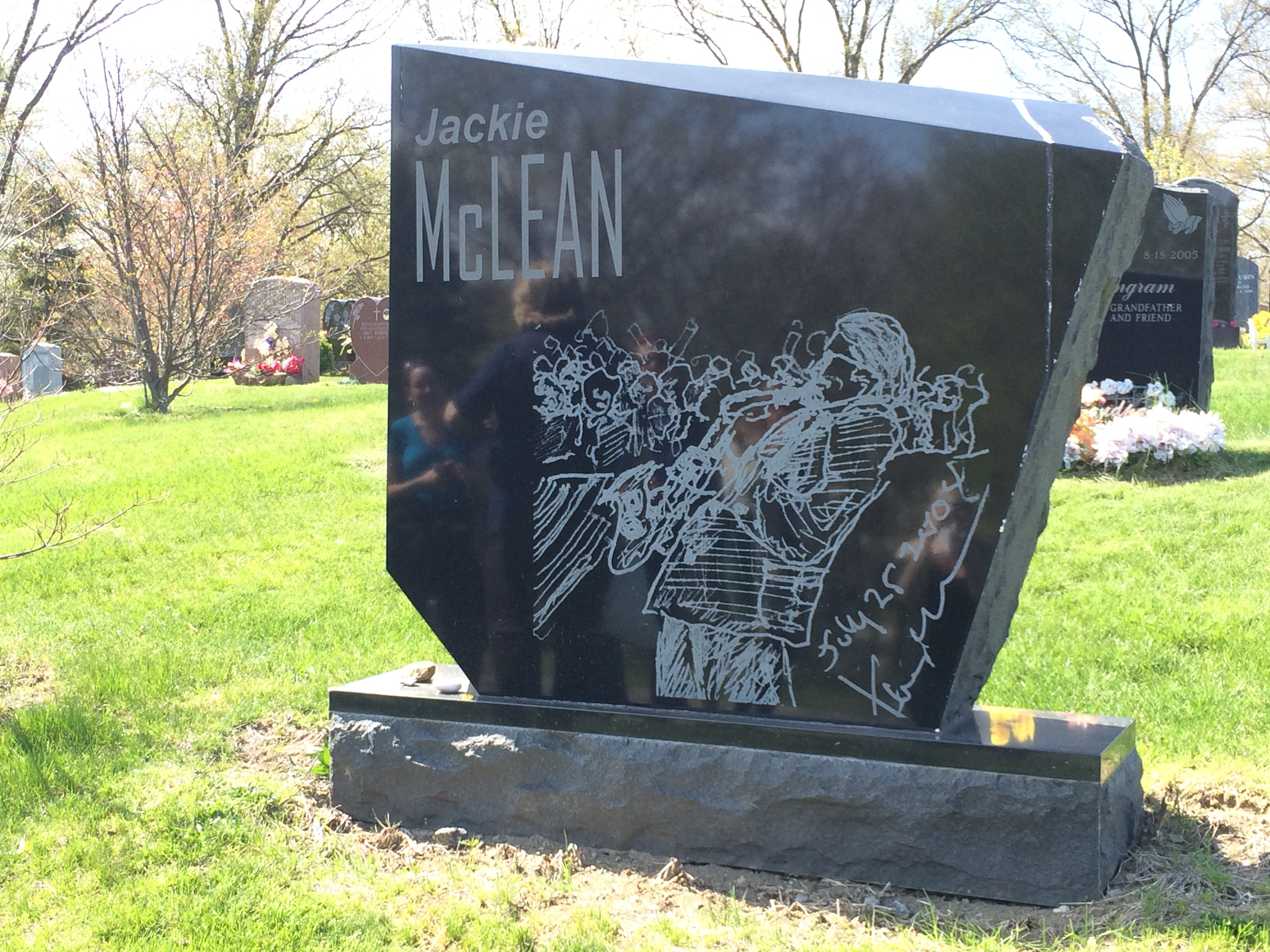
Jackie McLean's grave

McLean died aged 74 on March 31, 2006, in Hartford, Connecticut, after a long illness. In 2006, he was elected to the DownBeat Jazz Hall of Fame via the International Critics Poll. He is interred in Woodlawn Cemetery, The Bronx, New York City, with an image of him playing the saxophone, etched in black granite, high on a hill.

A. B. Spellman's 1966 study, Black Music, Four Lives: Cecil Taylor, Ornette Coleman, Herbie Nichols, Jackie McLean, still in print, includes extensive mid-career reflections by McLean on his youth and career to date. Derek Ansell's full-length biography of McLean, Sugar Free Saxophone. details the story of his career and provides a full analysis of his music on record.

== Discography ==
=== As leader/co-leader ===
Recording date	Title / Co-leader	Label	Year released	Notes
1955-10	Presenting... Jackie McLean	Ad Lib	1955	
1956-01	Lights Out!	Prestige	1956	
1956-07	4, 5 and 6	Prestige	1956	
1956-08	Jackie's Pal a.k.a. Steeplechase	Prestige	1957	As Jackie McLean Quintet (introducing Bill Hardman)
1956-12, 1957-02	McLean's Scene	Prestige (New Jazz)	1959	
1957-02	Jackie McLean & Co.	Prestige	1957	
1957-05	Alto Madness with John Jenkins	Prestige	1957	
1957-02, 1957-07	Strange Blues	Prestige	1967	
1957-02, 1957-08	Makin' the Changes	Prestige (New Jazz)	1960	
1957-02, 1957-08	A Long Drink of the Blues	Prestige (New Jazz)	1961	
1957-12	Fat Jazz	Jubilee	1959	
1959-05	New Soil	Blue Note	1959	
1959-10	Swing, Swang, Swingin'	Blue Note	1960	
1960-04	Capuchin Swing	Blue Note	1960	
1960-06	Street Singer with Tina Brooks	Blue Note	1980	
1959-01, 1960-09	Jackie's Bag	Blue Note	1961	
1961-01	Bluesnik	Blue Note	1962	
1961-10	A Fickle Sonance	Blue Note	1962	
1961-11	Inta Somethin' with Kenny Dorham	Pacific Jazz	1962	
1962-03	Let Freedom Ring	Blue Note	1963	
1962-09	Tippin' the Scales	Blue Note	1979	Blue Note Sekai Hatsutōjō 1800 Series (Japan only)
1959-05, 1962-06, 1963-02	Vertigo	Blue Note	1980	LT series
1963-04	One Step Beyond	Blue Note	1964	
1963-09	Destination... Out!	Blue Note	1964	
1964-08	It's Time!	Blue Note	1965	
1964-09	Action Action Action	Blue Note	1967	
1965-01	Right Now!	Blue Note	1966	
1965-12	Consequence	Blue Note	1979	LT series
1965-09, 1966-04	Jacknife	Blue Note	1975	
1966-12	Dr. Jackle	SteepleChase	1979	
1966-12	Tune Up	SteepleChase	1981	
1962-06, 1967-02	Hipnosis	Blue Note	1978	
1967-03	New and Old Gospel	Blue Note	1968	
1967-09	'Bout Soul	Blue Note	1969	
1967-12	Demon's Dance	Blue Note	1970	
1972-08	Live at Montmartre	SteepleChase	1972	Live
1973-07	Altissimo with Lee Konitz, Gary Bartz and Charlie Mariano	Philips	1973	
1973-07	Ode to Super	SteepleChase	1973	featuring Gary Bartz
1973-07	A Ghetto Lullaby	SteepleChase	1974	Live
1973-07	The Meeting	SteepleChase	1974	Live featuring Dexter Gordon
1973-07	The Source	SteepleChase	1974	featuring Dexter Gordon (Vol. 2)
1974-08	Antiquity with Michael Carvin	SteepleChase	1975	
1974-10	New York Calling	SteepleChase	1974	with the Cosmic Brotherhood (Billy Skinner, René McLean, Billy Gault, James "Fish" Benjamin, Michael Carvin)
1976-04	Like Old Times with Mal Waldron	Victor (JP)	1976	
1978-04	New Wine in Old Bottles	East Wind (JP)	1978	
1978-11 – 1979-01	Monuments	RCA	1979	
1985-04	It's About Time with McCoy Tyner	Blue Note	1985	
1986-09	Left Alone '86 with Mal Waldron	Paddle Wheel	1986	Live
1988-11	Dynasty	Triloka	1990	featuring René McLean
1991-01	Rites of Passage	Triloka	1991	featuring René McLean
1991-04	The Jackie Mac Attack Live	Birdology/Verve	1993	Live
1992-03	Rhythm of the Earth	Antilles/Birdology	1992	
1996-01	Hat Trick	Somethin' Else (JP)	1996	with Junko Onishi
1997-07	Fire & Love	Somethin' Else (JP)/Blue Note	1997	
1999-06	Nature Boy	Somethin' Else (JP)/Blue Note	1999	

Compilations

- Complete 1955-1957 Quartet Quintet Sextet Sessions (Jazz Connections, 2007) – comprises Presenting... Jackie McLean up to Fat Jazz
- The Complete Jubilee Sessions (Lone Hill Jazz, 2008) – combines Fat Jazz and Jackie McLean Quintet

=== As sideman ===
The sortable table's default is the date of the recording session. An asterisk (*) behind the album's title signifies only a minor contribution by McLean to the recording.

Recorded date	Leader	Album	Label	Year released
1951-01, 1951-10	Miles Davis	Blue Period	Blue Note	1953
1951-10	Miles Davis	The New Sounds	Blue Note	1951
1951-10	Miles Davis	Dig	Blue Note	1956
1952-05	Miles Davis	Young Man with a Horn	Blue Note	1953
1952-05	Miles Davis	Miles Davis Vols. 1 & 2	Blue Note	1956
1955-08	Miles Davis (and Milt Jackson)	Quintet/Sextet	Prestige	1956
1955-09	George Wallington	Live! at Cafe Bohemia	Progressive	1956
1956-01	Charles Mingus Jazz Workshop	Pithecanthropus Erectus	Atlantic	1956
1956-04	Gene Ammons	Hi Fidelity Jam Session a.k.a. The Happy Blues	Prestige	1956
1956-07	Gene Ammons	Jammin' with Gene	Prestige	1956
1956-07	Hank Mobley	Mobley's Message	Prestige	1957
1956-08	Art Farmer and Donald Byrd	2 Trumpets	Prestige	1957
1956-12	Art Blakey and the Jazz Messengers	Hard Bop	Columbia	1957
1956-12	Art Blakey	Originally	Columbia	1982
1956-12	Art Blakey	Drum Suite	Columbia	1957
1957-01	Gene Ammons	Funky	Prestige	1957
1957-01, 1957-02	Art Blakey	Ritual	Pacific Jazz	1960
1957-02	Art Taylor	Taylor's Wailers	Prestige	1957
1957-03	Kenny Burrell and Jimmy Raney	2 Guitars	Prestige	1957
1957-03	Art Blakey	A Midnight Session a.k.a. Mirage	Elektra, Savoy	1957
1957-03	Ray Draper	Tuba Sounds	Prestige	1957
1957-04?	Art Blakey	Tough!	Cadet	1966
1957-04	Art Blakey	A Night in Tunisia	Vik	1957
1957-04	Gene Ammons	Jammin' in Hi Fi with Gene Ammons	Prestige	1957
1957-04	Mal Waldron	Mal/2 (and The Dealers)	Prestige (Status)	1957
1958-01	Sonny Clark	Cool Struttin'	Blue Note	1958
1958-12	Donald Byrd	Off to the Races	Blue Note	1959
1959-02	Charles Mingus	Blues & Roots	Atlantic	1960
1959-02	Mal Waldron	Left Alone*	Bethlehem	1959
1959-08	Walter Davis Jr.	Davis Cup	Blue Note	1960
1959-10	Donald Byrd	Fuego	Blue Note	1960
1960-02	Freddie Redd	The Music from "The Connection"	Blue Note	1960
1960-03	Jimmy Smith	Open House	Blue Note	1968
1960-03	Jimmy Smith	Plain Talk*	Blue Note	1968
1960-04	Lee Morgan	Lee-Way	Blue Note	1961
1960-07	Donald Byrd	Byrd in Flight	Blue Note	1960
1960-08	Freddie Redd	Shades of Redd	Blue Note	1961
1960-09	Tina Brooks	Back to the Tracks	Blue Note	1998
1961	Freddie Redd	Redd's Blues	Blue Note	1988
1962	Kenny Dorham	Matador	United Artists	1963
1963	Grachan Moncur III	Evolution	Blue Note	1964
1964	Lee Morgan	Tom Cat	Blue Note	1980
1965	Lee Morgan	Cornbread	Blue Note	1967
1965	Lee Morgan	Infinity	Blue Note	1981
1966	Lee Morgan	Charisma	Blue Note	1969
1967	Jack Wilson	Easterly Winds	Blue Note	1968
1967	Hank Mobley	Hi Voltage	Blue Note	1968
1967	Lee Morgan	The Sixth Sense	Blue Note	1970
1976	Mal Waldron	Like Old Time	Victor (Jp)	1976
1977	Art Farmer	Live in Tokyo	CTI (Jp)	1977
1985	All Star band	One Night with Blue Note Preserved Vol. 2	Blue Note	1985
1989	All star band	Birdology: Live at the TBB Jazz Festival (Vol. 1 & 2)	Verve (F)	1989, 1990
1989	All star band with Dizzy Gillespie	The Paris All Stars - Homage to Charlie Parker	A&M	1990
1989	Art Blakey's Jazz Messengers	The Art of Jazz	In & Out	1989
1990	Abbey Lincoln	The World Is Falling Down	Verve	1990
1991	Miles Davis	Black Devil a.k.a. At La Villette (DVD)*	Beech Marten, JVC (Jp)	1992, 2001
1992	Dizzy Gillespie	To Bird with Love	Telarc	1992
1992	Dizzy Gillespie	Bird Songs: The Final Recordings*	Telarc	1992

== Filmography ==
- The Connection, as himself (dir. Shirley Clarke)
- Jackie McLean on Mars (1980), as himself (dir. Ken Levis)
- Ken Burns' Jazz (2000), as himself (dir. Ken Burns)
