= Discoveries (Cannonball Adderley album) =

Compilation album by Cannonball Adderley
- Released: 1987
- Recorded: July 14, 1955
- Genre: Jazz
- Length: 35:27
- Label: Savoy

Cannonball Adderley chronology
Bohemia After Dark (1955)	Discoveries (1987)	Presenting Cannonball Adderley (1955)

Professional ratings
Review scores
Source	Rating
Allmusic	4.5/5 stars

Discoveries is a compilation album by jazz saxophonist Cannonball Adderley released on the Savoy label featuring alternate takes of tracks from Adderley's recording debut originally released as Kenny Clarke's Bohemia After Dark (1955) and his first album Presenting Cannonball Adderley (1955) performed by a quintet with Nat Adderley, Hank Jones, Paul Chambers, and Kenny Clarke and a septet with Donald Byrd and Jerome Richardson added and Horace Silver replacing Jones.

== Reception ==
The Allmusic review by Rick Anderson states "Adderley plays beautifully throughout... Unfortunately, the sound quality of this disc varies (sometimes within a single track) more than it should for a recording of this vintage, and the disc's 35-minute length is another annoyance. But the weight of great performances by Adderley, Silver and the infallible Clarke/Chambers axis, combined with the disc's attractive price, make it a solid value. Highly recommended". Several of these tracks were also included on the CD rerelease of Presenting Cannonball Adderley.

== Track listing ==
All compositions by Julian "Cannonball" Adderley and Nat Adderley except as indicated

1. "With Apologies to Oscar" [Take 1] - 5:44
2. "Bohemia After Dark" [Take 1] (Oscar Pettiford) - 5:45
3. "Chasm" [Take 3] - 4:09
4. "Late Entry" [Take 4] - 3:16
5. "A Little Taste" [Take 1] (Julian "Cannonball" Adderley) - 5:00
6. "Caribbean Cutie" [Take 1] (Julian "Cannonball" Adderley) - 5:18
7. "Spontaneous Combustion" [Take 4] (Julian "Cannonball" Adderley) - 0:39
8. "With Apologies to Oscar" [Take 2] - 5:44
  - Recorded in New York City on June 28 (tracks 1–4 & 8), and July 14 (tracks 5–7), 1955

== Personnel ==
- Cannonball Adderley – alto saxophone
- Nat Adderley – cornet
- Donald Byrd – trumpet (tracks 1–3 & 8)
- Jerome Richardson – tenor saxophone, flute (tracks 1–4 & 8)
- Horace Silver – piano (tracks 1–4 & 8)
- Hank Jones – piano (tracks 5–7)
- Kenny Clarke – drums
- Paul Chambers – bass
