= Gold Coast (album) =

Compilation album by John Coltrane and Wilbur Harden
- Released: 1977
- Recorded: May 13 and June 24, 1958; Van Gelder Studio, Hackensack
- Genre: Jazz
- Label: Savoy Records; SJL 1115
- Producer: Ozzie Cadena

Gold Coast is a compilation album by jazz musicians John Coltrane and Wilbur Harden, released in 1977 just after Dial Africa: The Savoy Sessions, featuring pieces recorded during the two 1958 sessions that produced Tanganyika Strut and Jazz Way Out.

== Reception ==
Professional ratings
Review scores
Source	Rating
AllMusic	2.5/5 stars
The Rolling Stone Jazz Record Guide	3/5 stars

In a review for AllMusic, Scott Yanow wrote, "John Coltrane's Savoy recordings with fluegelhornist Wilbur Harden are enjoyable but not particularly innovative... Despite all of the emphasis on Africa in the song titles, the music is essentially American bebop featuring Coltrane, Harden and trombonist Curtis Fuller; Harden and Fuller contributed two originals apiece. This album is a companion of Dial Africa."

== Track listing ==
1. "Tanganyika Strut" – 9:57
2. "Dial Africa" – 8:42
3. "Gold Coast" – 14:34
4. "B.J." – 4:32

== Personnel ==
- John Coltrane – tenor saxophone
- Wilbur Harden – trumpet, flugelhorn
- Curtis Fuller – trombone
- Tommy Flanagan – piano (tracks 1–3)
- Howard Williams – piano (track 4)
- Alvin Jackson – bass
- Art Taylor – drums
