= Dial Africa: The Savoy Sessions =

Compilation album by John Coltrane and Wilbur Harden
- Released: 1977
- Recorded: May 13 & June 24, 1958; Van Gelder Studio, Hackensack
- Genre: Jazz
- Label: Savoy; SJL 1110
- Producer: Ozzie Cadena

John Coltrane and Wilbur Harden chronology
Black Pearls (1958)	Dial Africa: The Savoy Sessions (1977)	Gold Coast (1958)

Dial Africa: The Savoy Sessions is a compilation album by jazz musicians John Coltrane and Wilbur Harden released in 1977, featuring pieces recorded during the two 1958 sessions that produced Tanganyika Strut and Jazz Way Out.

== Reception ==
Professional ratings
Review scores
Source	Rating
AllMusic	4/5 stars
The Rolling Stone Jazz Record Guide	3/5 stars

In a review for AllMusic, Thom Jurek wrote: "Coltrane and Harden were in many ways a dream team: Coltrane's already fiery playing, which pushed bop phrasing to the seam and split it, is anchored beautifully by Harden's deeply lyrical and airy playing. They weave through one another with great balance and poise, particularly on the slightly funky title cut. Of the four sessions Coltrane and Harden recorded together, start with this one."

== Track listing ==
1. "Dial Africa" [Take 2, Master] (Wilbur Harden) – 8:42
2. "Anedac" (Wilbur Harden) – 5:12
3. "B.J." [Take 2] (Wilbur Harden) – 4:56
4. "B.J." [Take 3, Master] (Wilbur Harden) – 4:32
5. "Once in a While" (Michael Edwards (m) - Bud Green (w)) – 9:28
6. "Oomba" (Wilbur Harden) – 5:31

== Personnel ==
- John Coltrane – tenor saxophone
- Wilbur Harden – trumpet, flugelhorn
- Curtis Fuller – trombone
- Tommy Flanagan – piano (#1, 6)
- Howard Williams – piano (#2–5)
- Alvin Jackson – bass
- Art Taylor – drums
