= Countdown: The Savoy Sessions =

Compilation album by John Coltrane and Wilbur Harden
- Released: 1978
- Recorded: March 13, 1958; Van Gelder Studio, Hackensack
- Genre: Jazz
- Label: Savoy; SJL 2203
- Producer: Ozzie Cadena

Professional ratings
Review scores
Source	Rating
The Rolling Stone Jazz Record Guide	4/5 stars

Countdown: The Savoy Sessions is a compilation album by jazz musicians John Coltrane and Wilbur Harden. It was issued on Savoy Records in 1978 as SJL 2203 and comprises all the pieces recorded on the March 13, 1958 session. Actually, the only unissued original track is "Count Down", the remainder being mere alternate takes of the pieces featured on Mainstream 1958: The East Coast Jazz Scene. All the tracks can also be found on two compilations which feature the complete Savoy recordings made by Harden and Coltrane together, The Complete Mainstream 1958 Sessions (2009) and The Complete Savoy Sessions (1999).

== Track listing ==
1. "Wells Fargo I" – 7:26
2. "Wells Fargo II" [master] – 7:16
3. "E.F.F.P.H" – 5:26
4. "Count Down I" [master] – 7:26
5. "Count Down II" – 7:56
6. "Rhodomagnetics I" [master] – 7:11
7. "Rhodomagnetics II " – 7:59
8. "Snuffy" – 9:37
9. "West 42nd Street" – 7:51

== Personnel ==
- John Coltrane – tenor saxophone
- Wilbur Harden – trumpet, flugelhorn
- Tommy Flanagan – piano
- Doug Watkins – bass
- Louis Hayes – drums
