= Jazz for Playboys =

Studio album by Frank Wess, Joe Newman, Kenny Burrell and Freddie Greene
- Released: 1957
- Recorded: December 26, 1956 and January 5, 1957
- Studios: Van Gelder Studio, Hackensack, New Jersey
- Genre: Jazz
- Length: 39:16
- Labels: Savoy; MG 12095
- Producer: Ozzie Cadena

Frank Wess chronology
Opus in Swing (1956)	Jazz for Playboys (1957)	Wheelin' & Dealin' (1957)

Jazz for Playboys is an album by saxophonist Frank Wess, trumpeter Joe Newman and guitarists Kenny Burrell and Freddie Greene recorded in late 1956 and early 1957 and released on the Savoy label.

Professional ratings
Review scores
Source	Rating
Allmusic	3/5 stars

== Track listing ==
1. "Playboy" (Ernie Wilkins) – 5:24
2. "Miss Blues" (Joe Newman) – 9:37
3. "Baubles, Bangles and Beads" (Robert Wright, George Forrest) – 4:13
4. "Low Life" (Johnny Mandel) – 4:59
5. "Pin Up" (Frank Wess) – 4:05
6. "Blues for a Playmate" (Kenny Burrell) – 10:58
7. "Southern Exposure" (alt. long take) – 7:42 - bonus track not on original LP
- Recorded at Van Gelder Studio, Hackensack, NJ on December 26, 1956 (tracks 1, 2 & 4) and January 5, 1957 (tracks 3, 5 & 6); track 7 recorded June 20, 1956

== Personnel ==
- Frank Wess – tenor saxophone, alto saxophone, flute
- Joe Newman – trumpet (tracks 1, 2 & 4)
- Kenny Burrell, Freddie Greene – guitar
- Eddie Jones – bass
- Gus Johnson (tracks 3, 5 & 6), Ed Thigpen (tracks 1, 2 & 4) – drums
- Kenny Clarke (track 7) – drums
