= Jackson's Ville =

Studio album by Milt Jackson
- Released: 1956
- Recorded: January 23, 1956
- Studio: Van Gelder Studio, Hackensack, NJ
- Genre: Jazz
- Length: 30:15
- Label: Savoy
- Producer: Ozzie Cadena

Milt Jackson chronology
The Jazz Skyline (1956)	Jackson's Ville (1956)	Ballads & Blues (1956)

Jackson's Ville is an album by American jazz vibraphonist Milt Jackson featuring performances recorded in 1956 and released on the Savoy label.

== Reception ==
The Allmusic review by Jim Todd stated: "This fine 1956 date features Jackson leading a session that moves with ease and authority through a relaxing eight-minute ride on Charlie Parker's 'Now's the Time,' an Ellington ballad medley, and a pair of the vibist's own blues-based, hard bop compositions. The real treat here is Lucky Thompson's tenor sax. The Don Byas-influenced Thompson has a sound that invites the listener to luxuriate in its grace and strength".

Professional ratings
Review scores
Source	Rating
Allmusic	4.5/5 stars

== Track listing ==
1. "Now's the Time" (Charlie Parker) – 8:16
2. "In a Sentimental Mood/Mood Indigo/Azure" (Duke Ellington) – 6:43
3. "Minor Conception" (Milt Jackson) – 8:36
4. "Soul in 3/4" (Jackson) – 6:40

== Personnel ==
- Milt Jackson – vibraphone
- Lucky Thompson – tenor saxophone
- Hank Jones – piano
- Wendell Marshall – bass
- Kenny Clarke – drums
