= Presenting Cannonball Adderley =

Presenting Cannonball

Studio album by Cannonball Adderley
- Released: 1955
- Recorded: July 14, 1955
- Studio: Van Gelder (Hackensack)
- Genre: Jazz
- Length: 70:05 CD release with additional tracks
- Label: Savoy
- Producer: Ozzie Cadena

Cannonball Adderley chronology
Presenting Cannonball (1955)	Julian "Cannonball" Adderley (1955)

Reissue cover

Presenting Cannonball is the 1955 debut album by jazz saxophonist Cannonball Adderley, released on the Savoy label, featuring a quintet with Nat Adderley, Hank Jones, Paul Chambers, and Kenny Clarke. A 1994 Japanese CD release also included alternate takes of tracks from Adderley's recording debut previously released as Kenny Clarke's Bohemia After Dark (1955).

== Reception ==
Professional ratings
Review scores
Source	Rating
AllMusic	3/5 stars
The Penguin Guide to Jazz	3/4 stars

The Billboard review in 1955 stated: "This is strong, vibrant, swinging jazz of the moderate-modern school." The Penguin Guide to Jazz states: "Everything was already in place at the time of his 1955 debut with brother Nat playing the eternal second fiddle". The AllMusic review by Scott Yanow states: "Already at this early stage, Adderley was a powerful player with a soulful sound that was almost distinctive."

== Track listing ==
All compositions by Julian "Cannonball" Adderley except where noted.

1. "Spontaneous Combustion" - 10:06
2. "Still Talkin' to Ya" - 8:58
3. "A Little Taste" - 5:06
4. "Caribbean Cutie" - 7:06
5. "Flamingo" (Ted Grouya, Edmund Anderson) - 7:06
6. "With Apologies to Oscar" (Julian "Cannonball" Adderley, Nat Adderley) - 5:42 Bonus track on CD
7. "Late Entry" (Adderley, Adderley) - 3:16 Bonus track on CD
8. "Bohemia After Dark" (Oscar Pettiford) - 6:03 Bonus track on CD
9. "With Apologies to Oscar" [alternate take] (Julian "Cannonball" Adderley, Nat Adderley) - 5:42 Bonus track on CD
10. "A Little Taste" [alternate take] - 5:15 Bonus track on CD
11. "Bohemia After Dark" [alternate take] (Pettiford) - 5:45 Bonus track on CD

- Recorded on June 28 (tracks 6–9 & 11), and July 14 (tracks 1–5 & 10), 1955

== Personnel ==
- Cannonball Adderley – alto saxophone
- Nat Adderley – cornet (tracks 1–4 & 6–11)
- Donald Byrd – trumpet (tracks 6, 8–9 & 11)
- Jerome Richardson – tenor saxophone, flute (tracks 6–9 & 11)
- Horace Silver – piano (tracks 6–9 & 11)
- Hank Jones – piano (tracks 1–5 & 10)
- Kenny Clarke – drums
- Paul Chambers – bass
