= Mainstream 1958 =

Mainstream 1958: The East Coast Jazz Scene

Studio album by Wilbur Harden and John Coltrane
- Released: Late May 1958
- Recorded: March 13, 1958; Van Gelder Studio, Hackensack, NJ
- Genre: Jazz
- Length: 37:31
- Labels: Savoy; MG 12127
- Producer: Ozzie Cadena

Wilbur Harden and John Coltrane chronology
The King and I (1958)	Mainstream 1958: The East Coast Jazz Scene (1958)	Jazz Way Out (1958)

Mainstream 1958: The East Coast Jazz Scene is a 1958 album by jazz musicians Wilbur Harden and John Coltrane. It is the first of three collaborative albums with Harden and Coltrane as leaders, the other two being Jazz Way Out and Tanganyika Strut. The session produced several alternate takes; all of them can be found on the compilations featuring the complete Savoy recordings made by Harden and Coltrane together, The Complete Mainstream 1958 Sessions (2009) and The Complete Savoy Sessions (1999).

== Track listing ==
All tracks written by Wilbur Harden.

=== Side A ===
No.	Title	Length
1.	"Wells Fargo"	7:26
2.	"West 42nd St."	7:51
3.	"E.F.F.P.H"	5:26
Total length:		20:43

=== Side B ===
No.	Title	Length
1.	"Snuffy"	9:37
2.	"Rhodomagnetics"	7:11
Total length:		16:48 37:31

== Personnel ==
- Wilbur Harden - flugelhorn
- John Coltrane - tenor saxophone
- Tommy Flanagan - piano
- Doug Watkins - bass
- Louis Hayes - drums

== Literature ==
- Richard Cook & Brian Morton. The Penguin Guide to Jazz on CD 6th edition. ISBN 0-14-051521-6
