= Top Brass =

Studio album by Ernie Wilkins
- Released: 1956
- Recorded: November 8, 1955
- Studio: Van Gelder Studio, Hackensack, New Jersey
- Genre: Jazz
- Length: 37:52
- Label: Savoy; MG 12044
- Producer: Ozzie Cadena

Ernie Wilkins chronology
Flutes & Reeds (1955)	Top Brass (1956)	The Drum Suite (1956)

Top Brass (subtitled Featuring 5 Trumpets) is an album by American jazz composer and arranger Ernie Wilkins featuring performances recorded in 1955 and first released on the Savoy label. The album consists of five original selections with trumpeters Ray Copeland, Idrees Sulieman, Donald Byrd, Ernie Royal and Joe Wilder followed by five standards featuring each individually.

== Reception ==
Professional ratings
Review scores
Source	Rating
AllMusic	3/5 stars

The AllMusic review by Ken Dryden awarded the album 3 stars stating "If there's any complaint about this studio date at all, it is the excess reverb used at times, which is surprising due to Rudy Van Gelder's usually impeccable sound".

== Track listing ==
All compositions by Ernie Wilkins, except where indicated.

1. "58 Market Street" (Earl Van Riper, Ernie Wilkins) - 4:26
2. "Trick or Treat" (Manny Albam, Wilkins) - 5:22
3. "Speedway" - 4:43
4. "Dot's What" (Johnny Mandel) - 5:41
5. "Top Brass" - 3:22
6. "Willow Weep for Me" (Ann Ronell) - 2:16
7. "Imagination" (Jimmy Van Heusen, Johnny Burke) - 4:41
8. "It Might as Well Be Spring" (Richard Rodgers, Oscar Hammerstein II) - 1:01
9. "The Nearness of You" (Hoagy Carmichael, Ned Washington) - 2:37
10. "Taking a Chance on Love" (Vernon Duke, Ted Fetter, John La Touche) - 3:43

== Personnel ==
- Ernie Wilkins – arranger, conductor
- Ray Copeland (tracks 1–5 & 10), Idrees Sulieman (tracks 1–5 & 7), Donald Byrd (tracks 1–5 & 8), Ernie Royal (tracks 1–5 & 9), Joe Wilder (tracks 1–6) – trumpet
- Hank Jones – piano
- Wendell Marshall – bass
- Kenny Clarke – drums
