= Ali Jackson =

Ali Jackson may refer to:

- Alistair Jackson (born 1988), known as Ali, Northern Irish racing driver
- Ali Jackson (jazz drummer) (born 1976), American jazz drummer
- Ali Jackson (jazz bassist) (died 1987), American jazz bassist and composer
