= Klook's Clique =

Studio album by Kenny Clarke
- Released: 1956
- Recorded: February 6, 1956
- Studio: Van Gelder Studio, Hackensack, New Jersey
- Genre: Jazz
- Length: 34:17
- Label: Savoy; MG 12065
- Producer: Ozzie Cadena

Kenny Clarke chronology
Bohemia After Dark (1955)	Klook's Clique (1956)	Jazzmen: Detroit (1956)

Klook's Clique is an album led by drummer Kenny Clarke recorded in 1956 and first released on the Savoy label.

== Reception ==
Professional ratings
Review scores
Source	Rating
Allmusic	2.5/5 stars

The Allmusic reviewer David Szatmary described as "An indispensable session by the bop pioneer".

== Track listing ==
1. "Volcano" (Kenny Clarke) – 6:01
2. "La Porta-Thority" (John LaPorta) – 5:54
3. "I Hear a Rhapsody" (George Fragos, Jack Baker, Dick Gasparre) – 4:48
4. "Will Wail" (LaPorta) – 7:04
5. "Yesterdays" (Jerome Kern, Otto Harbach) – 5:58
6. "Play Fiddle Play" (Arthur Altman, Emery Deutsch, Jack Lawrence) – 4:32

== Personnel ==
- Kenny Clarke – drums
- Donald Byrd – trumpet
- John LaPorta – alto saxophone
- Ronnie Ball – piano
- Wendell Marshall – bass
