= Ali Jackson (jazz bassist) =

American jazz musician

Ali Muhammad Jackson (1931–1987), also known as Ali Jackson, was a jazz bassist and composer. Jackson spent most of his life as a professional jazz bass player in New York City. He performed live with artists such as Billie Holiday, John Coltrane, Elvin Jones, Thad Jones, Charles Mingus, Thelonious Monk, James Moody, and Mary Lou Williams.

== Early life ==
Jackson was born was in Detroit, Michigan on 29 March 1931. His brother was Oliver "Bops Jr."Jackson. Another relative was the vibraphonist Milt "Bags" Jackson.

== Career ==
In the late 1940s, Jackson was a member of a quartet, the AHJOs, named after the initials of each musician: Ali Jackson, Roland "Hac" Hanna, tenor saxophonist, Joe Alexander and, Jackson's brother, Oliver Jackson.

In the 1950s, Jackson played in a jazz trio, the Bu Bu Jackson Trio, with his brother, Oliver (drums) and Bu Bu Turner (piano) for a number of years. He was also briefly in the house band at the Blue Bird Inn, led by Billy Mitchell (together with his brother).

His composition "Prayer to the East" was the title track of Yusef Lateef's 1957 album.

Jackson returned to Detroit in 1970 to teach music at Wayne State University, Oakland University and the Metropolitan Black Arts Project funded by HUD. He also taught at Oberlin College and Greenwich House.

Jackson formed a musical group named Ali, the Chosen and Beloved and the Silver Flutes Flourish with his students. Randy Harp played bass, Michael Layne, Eddie Tann and Kathy Caesar were on flutes, Marcia Miller played the tambourine, Junior Hill played the golden shofar (a kind of trumpet), and Tony Pantoja played the conga drums. The group played for free for anyone under 10 or over 60.

In the 1980s, Jackson performed in his brother's quintet, which toured and recorded in Europe. The line-up of the Oliver Jackson Quintet that performed in Switzerland in 1984 comprised Oliver Jackson on drums, Arnett Cobb on saxophone, Irvin Stokes on trumpet, Claude Black on piano, and Ali Jackson on bass.

== Personal life ==
His son, Ali Jackson Jr., is a jazz drummer, who used to perform with the Lincoln Center Orchestra. Another son, Khalil Jackson is a Wall Street executive.

Jackson died in 1987.

== Discography ==
- 1954: recorded with Lionel Hampton
- 1956: Jazz at Ottawa University – Alex Kallao
- 1956: "Dial Africa (Arista)" – John Coltrane
- 1956: Wilbur Harden (Savoy)
- 1962: "Gretsch Drum Night at Birdland" (Roulette)
- 1966: Hank Crawford
- 1958: Jazz Way Out – John Coltrane/Wilbur Harden
- 1958: Tanganyika Strut – John Coltrane/Wilbur Harden
- 1984: Billie's Bounce – Oliver Jackson Quintet
