= North, South, East....Wess =

Studio album by Frank Wess
- Released: 1956
- Recorded: March 5 and 7, 1956
- Studio: Van Gelder Studio, Hackensack, New Jersey
- Genre: Jazz
- Length: 37:17
- Label: Savoy; MG 12072
- Producer: Ozzie Cadena

Frank Wess chronology
Flutes & Reeds (1955)	North, South, East....Wess (1956)	Opus in Swing (1956)

North, South, East....Wess is an album by saxophonist Frank Wess recorded in 1956 and released on the Savoy label.

== Reception ==
Professional ratings
Review scores
Source	Rating
Allmusic	2.5/5 stars

Allmusic reviewer by Jim Todd stated, "This easygoing swing date is essentially a small group drawn from the Count Basie band of the day. The two tenors, Wess and Frank Foster, and two trombones, Bennie Powell and Henry Coker, all from the Count's band, keep the sound comfortably cruising near the middle register ... The best moments come when Wess switches to flute, the instrument on which he does have a distinctive and appealing musical personality".

== Track listing ==
All compositions by Frank Wess except where noted

1. "What'd Ya Say" (Ozzie Cadena) – 9:41
2. "Dill Pickles" (Frank Foster) – 6:08
3. "Dancing on the Ceiling" (Richard Rodgers, Lorenz Hart) – 3:45
4. "Hard Sock Dance" – 7:42
5. "Salvation" – 3:51
6. "Lazy Sal" (Henry Coker) – 6:10
- Recorded at Van Gelder Studio, Hackensack, NJ on March 5, 1956 (tracks 2–4) and March 7, 1956 (tracks 1, 5 & 6)

== Personnel ==
- Frank Wess – tenor saxophone, flute
- Frank Foster – tenor saxophone
- Henry Coker, Benny Powell – trombone
- Kenny Burrell – guitar
- Eddie Jones - bass
- Kenny Clarke - drums
