= Wilder 'n' Wilder =

Studio album by Joe Wilder
- Released: 1956
- Recorded: January 19, 1956
- Studio: Van Gelder Studio, Hackensack, New Jersey
- Genre: Jazz
- Length: 38:01
- Label: Savoy; MG 12063
- Producer: Ozzie Cadena

Joe Wilder chronology
Wilder 'n' Wilder (1956)	The Pretty Sound (1959)

Wilder 'n' Wilder (also released as Softly with Feeling) is an album led by jazz trumpeter Joe Wilder recorded in 1956 and first released on the Savoy label.

== Reception ==
Professional ratings
Review scores
Source	Rating
Allmusic	4/5 stars

The Allmusic review by Stephen Cook stated: "The quartet effortlessly works through six cuts ... While Wilder takes quality solos throughout, especially on the slower cuts, Jones matches him track for track with his own elegantly swinging and thoughtful statements. One of the best of the trumpeter's early dates".

== Track listing ==
1. "Cherokee" (Ray Noble) – 10:38
2. "Prelude to a Kiss" (Duke Ellington, Irving Gordon, Irving Mills) – 5:00
3. "My Heart Stood Still" (Richard Rodgers, Lorenz Hart) – 4:30
4. "Six Bit Blues" (Ozzie Cadena) – 8:26
5. "Mad About the Boy" (Noël Coward) – 4:28
6. "Darn That Dream" (Jimmy Van Heusen, Eddie DeLange) – 4:59

== Personnel ==
- Joe Wilder – trumpet
- Hank Jones – piano
- Wendell Marshall – bass
- Kenny Clarke – drums
