= Musician of the Year =

Studio album by Eddie Bert
- Released: 1955
- Recorded: May 31, 1955
- Studio: Van Gelder Studio, Hackensack, New Jersey
- Genre: Jazz
- Length: 37:47
- Label: Savoy; MG 12015
- Producer: Ozzie Cadena

Eddie Bert chronology
Eddie Bert Quintet (1953)	Musician of the Year (1955)	Encore (1955)

Musician of the Year is an album led by jazz trombonist Eddie Bert recorded in 1955 and first released on the Savoy label.

== Reception ==
Professional ratings
Review scores
Source	Rating
Allmusic	4/5 stars

The Allmusic review by Ken Dryden stated: "While the original album title may be a sign of the record label getting carried away, trombonist Eddie Bert is a strong bebop trombonist like J.J. Johnson. On this session he's joined by the always superb pianist Hank Jones, plus Wendell Marshall and Kenny Clarke. ... Bert's been more active as a sideman than a leader since the '50s, so this is one album that his fans need to acquire".

== Track listing ==
All compositions by Eddie Bert, except where indicated.

1. "Fragile" (Ernie Wilkins) – 5:25
2. "Stompin' at the Savoy" (Edgar Sampson, Benny Goodman, Andy Razaf, Chick Webb) – 3:19
3. "I Should'a Said" – 4:32
4. "See You Later" – 5:02
5. "Three Bass Hit" (Ozzie Cadena) – 7:36
6. "What D'Ya Say?" (Cadena) – 5:45
7. "Billie's Bounce" (Charlie Parker) – 3:37

== Personnel ==
- Eddie Bert – trombone
- Hank Jones – piano
- Wendell Marshall – bass
- Kenny Clarke – drums
