= Flutes & Reeds =

Studio album by Ernie Wilkins and Frank Wess
- Released: 1955
- Recorded: August 2, 1955
- Studio: Van Gelder Studio, Hackensack, NJ
- Genre: Jazz
- Length: 35:20
- Label: Savoy; MG 12022
- Producer: Ozzie Cadena

Ernie Wilkins chronology
Kenny Clarke & Ernie Wilkins (1955)	Flutes & Reeds (1955)	Top Brass (1955)

Frank Wess chronology
Flutes & Reeds (1955)	North, South, East....Wess (1956)

Flutes & Reeds is an album by American jazz saxophonist/composer/arranger Ernie Wilkins and saxophonist/flautist Frank Wess featuring performances recorded in 1955 and first released on the Savoy label. The Shown cover art is from the 1970s Savoy Jazz re-issue.

== Reception ==
The Allmusic site awarded the album 4½ stars.

Professional ratings
Review scores
Source	Rating
Allmusic	4.5/5 stars

== Track listing ==
All compositions by Ernie Wilkins except where noted

1. "Shorty George" (Count Basie, Andy Gibson) – 5:40
2. "Bouncin' with Boots"– 11:17
3. "That's a Woman" (Marcel Daniels) – 3:19
4. "Doin' the Thing" (Frank Foster) – 6:41
5. "Blues in a Cold Water Flat" – 5:14
6. "Stereophonic" – 3:09

== Personnel ==
- Ernie Wilkins – alto saxophone, – featured on track 3 – arranger, conductor
- Jerome Richardson, Frank Wess – tenor saxophone, flute
- Hank Jones – piano
- Eddie Jones – bass
- Kenny Clarke – drums
