= Opus in Swing =

1956 album by Frank Wess

Studio album by Frank Wess
- Released: 1956
- Recorded: June 20, 1956
- Studio: Van Gelder Studio, Hackensack, New Jersey
- Genre: Jazz
- Length: 31:18
- Label: Savoy; MG 12085
- Producer: Ozzie Cadena

Frank Wess chronology
North, South, East....Wess (1956)	Opus in Swing (1956)	Jazz for Playboys (1957)

Opus in Swing is an album by saxophonist Frank Wess recorded in 1956 and released on the Savoy label.

== Reception ==
Professional ratings
Review scores
Source	Rating
Allmusic	3/5 stars

Allmusic reviewer by Jim Newsom stated, "Wess' playing is superb, while the guitar solos of then-newcomer Kenny Burrell shine brightly above the solid accompaniment of the swinging rhythm section. This is timeless music".

== Track listing ==
All compositions by Frank Wess except where noted

1. "Kansas City Side" – 8:28
2. "Southern Exposure" (Kenny Burrell) – 6:46
3. "Over the Rainbow" (Harold Arlen, Yip Harburg) – 5:57
4. "Wess Side" – 4:58
5. "East Wind" – 5:09

== Personnel ==
- Frank Wess – flute
- Kenny Burrell, Freddie Green – guitar
- Eddie Jones - bass
- Kenny Clarke - drums
