= J. R. Monterose =

American jazz saxophonist

- Born: Frank Anthony Peter Vincent Monterose, Jr. January 19, 1927; Detroit, Michigan, U.S.
- Died: September 16, 1993 (aged 66) Utica, New York, U.S.
- Genres: Jazz
- Occupation: Musician
- Instrument: Saxophone
- Years active: 1947–1988

J. R. Monterose (January 19, 1927 – September 16, 1993), born Frank Anthony Peter Vincent Monterose, Jr., was an American jazz saxophonist, playing mainly tenor and occasionally soprano.

Monterose played in the bebop and hard bop styles and had early successes in the late 1950's playing with leading jazz figures in New York City such as Charles Mingus (whom he disliked), and Kenny Dorham (whom he admired). Monterose left New York in the early 1960's determined to follow his own artistic path in jazz rather than doing session work or shifting to rock or pop music. To make a living as an independent jazz artist, he played long engagements often for months at small jazz clubs away from major cities. Monterose was highly regarded both by jazz club owners and by musicians such as David Sanborn who dropped out of music school at Northwestern University to play and study with Monterose. Despite his reputation in the jazz community, Monterose's preference for small-group work in out of the way places would shape much of his subsequent career, contributing to the musical growth but relegating him to obscurity.

Monterose is not to be confused with tenor saxophonist Jack Montrose.

== Early life ==
Born in Detroit, Michigan, United States, J.R. or JR (derived from Jr.) Monterose grew up in Utica, New York, where his family moved a few months after his birth. He began formal clarinet studies at thirteen, but was largely self-taught as a tenor saxophonist, which he took up at the age of 15 after hearing Glenn Miller band soloist Tex Beneke. Monterose's earliest influences were Coleman Hawkins and Chu Berry, but, as he told critic Leonard Feather, he also found harmonic inspiration in pianists, citing Bud Powell and the instruction of Utica-based guitarist and pianist Sam Mancuso, in helping him learn how to use chord changes.

== Professional career ==
Monterose's first professional experience was playing in upstate New York territory bands (1947–49). In 1950, he joined Henry "Hot Lips" Busse's touring orchestra. After a brief return to Utica, he joined the Buddy Rich big band in late 1951. Though the band had some excellent bop-oriented musicians (Rich, Dave Schildkraut, Allen Eager and Philly Joe Jones), Monterose soon left, citing the lack of soloing opportunities. "After six months I was drugged with my own playing," he declared in a 1956 interview, "and I went back home and spent the next couple of years working in little joints but with good men."

In New York City in the mid- to late 1950s, Monterose was a featured soloist with Claude Thornhill's orchestra, and with vibraphonist Teddy Charles's modernist groups, Charles Mingus's Jazz Workshop and Kenny Dorham's short-lived Jazz Prophets. Dorham, Monterose told critic Mark Gardner in 1975, "was one of the greatest leaders and players I ever played for....A wonderful musician." He also recorded two sessions as leader: J. R. Monterose (Blue Note, 1956), produced by Alfred Lion with liner notes by Leonard Feather, and The Message (JARO, 1959), produced by Manny Albam, with Nat Hentoff providing commentary.

The record of Monterose's life thereafter, however, is one of sparsely documented itinerancy, pursuing his evolving craft in small-time U.S. venues and during extended stays (late 1960s through the mid-1970s) in Belgium, The Netherlands and Denmark, with occasional low-profile recordings (In Action, Body and Soul) recorded in such places as Cedar Rapids, Iowa, and Wageningen, The Netherlands.

The last decade and a half of Monterose's life was spent at upstate New York venues, including the Lark Tavern in Albany. Live recordings at the Lark and other upstate New York venues, such as Opus 40, have been released by Croscrane Records. His visit to play Copenhagen's Jazzhuz in 1988, recorded by Danish Broadcasting, has been released by Storyville under the title T.T.T. Other live recordings from his final years, when he was in less than robust health, are available on the Croscrane specialty label.

== Influence and legacy ==
While Monterose considered himself an underground artist, his work, both as player and composer, remains esteemed by musicians, critics and aficionados of classic jazz. He never denied having been influenced by Stan Getz, Sonny Rollins and John Coltrane, but refused to be pigeonholed in any particular style. "I've tried all my life to avoid copying. If I can't be myself, there's no point being in jazz." It was this uncompromising insistence on going his own way, both musically and geographically, that moved jazz historian and writer David Brent Johnson to describe Monterose as "The Best Tenor You Never Heard".

== Discography ==
=== As leader ===
- 1956: J. R. Monterose (Blue Note)
- 1959: The Message (JARO, re-issued also as Straight Ahead) with Tommy Flanagan
- 1963: Live at the Tender Trap, (Fresh Sound) with Al Jarreau
- 1969: J.R. Monterose is Alive in Amsterdam Paradiso (Heavy Soul Records)
- 1970: Body and Soul (Munich)
- 1980: Live In Albany, (Uptown Records)
- 1981: ...And a Little Pleasure (Uptown Records) with Tommy Flanagan
- 1988: T. T. T. (Storyville)

=== As sideman ===
With Kenny Burrell

- Kenny Burrell (Blue Note, 1956), on one track from the Kenny Dorham Café Bohemia recording

With Eddie Bert

- Encore (Savoy, 1955)
- Montage (Savoy, 1955)

With Teddy Charles

- Teddy Charles N. D. Quartet Introducing J. R. Montrose (New Jazz, 1955, reissued as Evolution in 1957)
- The Teddy Charles Tentet (Atlantic, 1956)

With Freddie Deronde

- Spontaneous Effort (Igloo, 1990), with Philip Catherine and Michel Herr

With Kenny Dorham

- Kenny Dorham and the Jazz Prophets, Vol. 1 (ABC-Paramount, 1956)
- 'Round About Midnight at the Cafe Bohemia, Vol. 1–3 10 inch, Vol 1-2 12 inch (Blue Note, 1956)

With Jon Eardley

- Hey There (Prestige, 1955)

With Charles Mingus

- Pithecanthropus Erectus (1956)

With the René Thomas Quintet

- Guitar Groove (Jazzland, 1960)

With the George Wallington Quintet

- The Prestidigitator (East-West, 1958)
