= Prayer to the East =

Studio album by Yusef Lateef
- Released: 1957
- Recorded: October 10, 1957
- Studio: Van Gelder Studio, Hackensack, New Jersey
- Genre: Jazz
- Length: 44:47
- Label: Savoy; MG 12117
- Producer: Ozzie Cadena

Yusef Lateef chronology
Jazz and the Sounds of Nature (1957)	Prayer to the East (1957)	The Sounds of Yusef (1957)

Prayer to the East is an album by multi-instrumentalist Yusef Lateef recorded in 1957 and released on the Savoy label.

The title track was composed by the bassist Ali Jackson, the brother of drummer Oliver Jackson.

== Reception ==
Professional ratings
Review scores
Source	Rating
Allmusic	3.5/5 stars

The Allmusic site stated: "Prayer to the East by Yusef Lateef remains a seemingly blessed moment of creative interaction between American modern jazz and the music of the so-called Arab East".

== Track listing ==
All compositions by Yusef Lateef except as indicated

1. "A Night in Tunisia" (Dizzy Gillespie) - 9:55
2. "Endura" (Yusef Lateef) - 13:10
3. "Prayer to the East" (Ali Jackson) - 8:19
4. "Love Dance" (Les Baxter) - 6:46
5. "Lover Man" (Jimmy Davis, Ram Ramirez, James Sherman) - 6:37

== Personnel ==
- Yusef Lateef - tenor saxophone, flute, tracks 3 and 4, tambourine
- Wilbur Harden - flugelhorn
- Hugh Lawson - piano, ocarina
- Ernie Farrow - bass
- Oliver Jackson - drums, gong
