= Kenny Clarke & Ernie Wilkins =

Studio album by Kenny Clarke and Ernie Wilkins
- Released: 1955
- Recorded: March 30, 1955
- Studio: Van Gelder Studio, Hackensack, New Jersey
- Genre: Jazz
- Length: 41:14
- Label: Savoy; MG 12007
- Producer: Ozzie Cadena

Ernie Wilkins chronology
Kenny Clarke & Ernie Wilkins (1955)	Flutes & Reeds (1955)

Kenny Clarke chronology
Telefunken Blues (1955)	Kenny Clarke & Ernie Wilkins (1955)	Bohemia After Dark (1955)

Kenny Clarke & Ernie Wilkins is an album by the Kenny Clarke-Ernie Wilkins Septet recorded in 1955 and first released on the Savoy label.

== Reception ==
Professional ratings
Review scores
Source	Rating
Allmusic	4/5 stars

The Allmusic review by Scott Yanow stated: "Overall this is an excellent outing for all concerned". On All About Jazz, reviewer Marc Myers observed: "By 1955, Wilkins' charts had developed a knack for tightly wound swing and swagger, typically resulting in a polished shout chorus at the end. With Wilkins, every arrangement was an aerodynamic adventure, and he never relied on gimmicks or repeated phrases. His originals always sounded modern--the blues retrofitted with an automatic transmission and air conditioning ... For me, this is a perfect mid-1950s jazz album of seductive beauty crafted for a small group that thinks it's a big band".

== Track listing ==
All compositions by Ernie Wilkins, except where indicated.

1. "Pru's Bloose" (Ozzie Cadena) – 3:46
2. "I Dig You the Most" – 6:53
3. "Cute Tomato" – 10:58
4. "Summer Evening" (Cadena) – 5:01
5. "Oz - the Wizard" – 3:58
6. "Now's the Time" (Charlie Parker) – 2:04
7. "Plenty for Kenny" (Cadena) – 8:34

== Personnel ==
- Kenny Clarke – drums
- Ernie Wilkins – alto saxophone, tenor saxophone, arranger
- Eddie Bert – trombone
- George Barrow – tenor saxophone, baritone saxophone
- Cecil Payne – baritone saxophone
- Hank Jones – piano
- Wendell Marshall – bass
