= Telefunken Blues =

Studio album by Kenny Clarke
- Released: 1955
- Recorded: November 1, 1954 & February 7, 1955
- Studio: Hollywood, CA and Van Gelder Studio, Hackensack, New Jersey
- Genre: Jazz
- Length: 37:47
- Label: Savoy; MG 12006
- Producer: Kenny Clarke, Ozzie Cadena

Kenny Clarke chronology
Telefunken Blues (1955)	Kenny Clarke & Ernie Wilkins (1955)

Telefunken Blues is an album led by jazz drummer Kenny Clarke recorded in late 1954 and early 1955 and first released on the Savoy label.

== Reception ==
Professional ratings
Review scores
Source	Rating
Allmusic	3/5 stars

The Allmusic review by Jim Todd stated: "Everyone's in good form on these two sessions from the mid-'50s. The earlier 1954 set, though, is the more interesting. It teams Modern Jazz Quartet alumni Kenny Clarke, Milt Jackson, and Percy Heath with West Coast beboppers ... The four tracks from the later 1955 date feature a familiar Savoy grouping of Count Basie band members ... Telefunken Blues is recommended for the set with Morgan, Benton, and Wiggins, although the session with the Count's men does offer several pleasures".

== Track listing ==
All compositions by Ernie Wilkins, except where indicated.

1. "Strollin'" (Kenny Clarke) – 4:21
2. "Sonor" (Gerald Wiggins, Clarke) – 4:50
3. "Blue's Mood" (Clarke) – 4:17
4. "Skoot" (Eddie Beal, Erroll Garner) – 3:48
5. "Telefunken Blues" – 5:50
6. "Klook's Nook" – 5:09
7. "Baggin' the Blues" – 5:40
8. "Inhibitions" – 3:52

- Recorded November 1, 1954 in Hollywood, CA (tracks 1–4) & February 7, 1955 at Van Gelder Studio, Hackensack, NJ (tracks 5–8)

== Personnel ==
- Kenny Clarke – drums
- Milt Jackson – vibraphone (tracks 1–4), piano (tracks 5–8)
- Henry Coker – trombone (tracks 5–8)
- Frank Morgan – alto saxophone (tracks 1–4)
- Walter Benton – tenor saxophone (tracks 1–4)
- Frank Wess – tenor saxophone, flute (tracks 5–8)
- Charlie Fowlkes – baritone saxophone (tracks 5–8)
- Gerald Wiggins – piano (tracks 1–4)
- Percy Heath – bass (tracks 1–4)
- Eddie Jones – bass (tracks 5–8)
- Ernie Wilkins – arranger (tracks 5–8)
