= Roll 'Em Bags =

Studio album by Milt Jackson
- Released: 1956
- Recorded: January 25, 1949 and January 5, 1956
- Studio: New York City and Van Gelder Studio, Hackensack, NJ
- Genre: Jazz
- Length: 42:21
- Label: Savoy; MG 12042
- Producer: Ozzie Cadena

Milt Jackson chronology
Concorde (1955)	Roll 'Em Bags (1956)	Meet Milt Jackson (1956)

Roll 'Em Bags is an album by American jazz vibraphonist Milt Jackson featuring performances recorded in 1949 and 1956 and released on the Savoy label.

== Reception ==
The Allmusic review by Jim Todd states: "Although not commonly viewed as a hard bop pioneer, the urbane, bluesy structures that distinguish Jackson's writing at this time, arguably, make him a trailblazer for the movement."

Professional ratings
Review scores
Source	Rating
Allmusic	3/5 stars

== Track listing ==
All compositions by Milt Jackson, except as indicated

1. "Conglomeration" – 2:52
2. "Bruz" – 2:50
3. "You Go to My Head" (J. Fred Coots, Haven Gillespie) – 2:55
4. "Roll 'Em Bags" – 2:39
5. "Faultless – 2:35
6. "Hey, Frenchy" (Ozzie Cadena) – 2:35
7. "Come Rain or Come Shine" (Harold Arlen, Johnny Mercer) – 5:38
8. "Fred's Mood" – 6:26
9. "Wild Man" – 5:40

- Recorded in New York City on January 25, 1949 (tracks 1–6) and Van Gelder Studio, NJ on January 5, 1956 (tracks 7–9)

== Personnel ==
- Milt Jackson – vibes, piano
- Kenny Dorham – trumpet (tracks 1–6)
- Julius Watkins – French horn (tracks 1–6)
- Billy Mitchell (tracks 1–6), Lucky Thompson (tracks 7–9) – tenor saxophone
- Wade Legge – piano (tracks 7–9)
- Wendell Marshall (tracks 7–9) Curly Russell (tracks 1–6) – bass
- Kenny Clarke – drums
- Joe Harris – timbales (tracks 1–6)
