= Montage (Savoy Records album) =

Compilation album by Eddie Bert/John Mehegan/Donald Byrd
- Released: 1955
- Recorded: September 1, 20 and 29, 1955
- Studio: Van Gelder Studio, Hackensack, New Jersey
- Genre: Jazz
- Label: Savoy; MG 12029
- Producer: Ozzie Cadena

Eddie Bert chronology
Encore (1955)	Montage (1955)	Modern Moods (1955)

Montage is an album comprising four tracks led by jazz trombonist Eddie Bert, two by pianist John Mehegan and one by trumpeter Donald Byrd recorded in September 1955 and first released on the Savoy label.

Professional ratings
Review scores
Source	Rating
Allmusic	2.5/5 stars

== Track listing ==
All compositions by Eddie Bert, except where indicated.

1. "Steady Eddie" – 5:24
2. "Crazy Rhythm" (Irving Caesar, Joseph Meyer, Roger Wolfe Kahn)
3. "Slow Crosstown" – 9:37
4. "If I Love Again" (Ben Oakland, Jack Murray)
5. "Bronx Line" – 6:54
6. "I'll Take Romance" (Oakland, Oscar Hammerstein II)
7. "Wishbone" – 6:33

- Recorded at Van Gelder Studio, Hackensack, NJ on September 1 (tracks 1, 3, 5 & 7), September 20 (tracks 2 & 6), and September 29 (track 4), 1955

== Personnel ==
Tracks 1, 3, 5 & 7

- Eddie Bert – trombone
- J. R. Monterose – tenor saxophone
- Hank Jones – piano
- Clyde Lombardi – bass
- Kenny Clarke – drums

Tracks 2 & 6

- John Mehegan – piano

Track 4

- Donald Byrd – trumpet
- Frank Foster – tenor saxophone
- Hank Jones – piano
- Paul Chambers – bass
- Kenny Clarke – drums
