= Encore (Eddie Bert album) =

Studio album by Eddie Bert
- Released: 1955
- Recorded: June 22 & September 1, 1955
- Studio: Van Gelder Studio, Hackensack, New Jersey
- Genre: Jazz
- Length: 34:48
- Label: Savoy; MG 12019
- Producer: Ozzie Cadena

Eddie Bert chronology
Musician of the Year (1955)	Encore (1955)	Montage (1955)

Encore is an album led by jazz trombonist Eddie Bert recorded in 1955 and first released on the Savoy label.

== Reception ==
Professional ratings
Review scores
Source	Rating
Allmusic	4.5/5 stars

The Allmusic review by Scott Yanow stated: "Trombonist Eddie Bert has had a long and honorable musical career but relatively few opportunities to record as a leader. He is heard in two different settings ... with a pianoless quartet that includes guitarist Joe Puma and with a quintet that includes pianist Hank Jones and the complementary tenor of J.R. Monterose. The repertoire consists entirely of originals by either Bert or Puma but the style is very much of the era: cool-toned and lightly swinging bop. ... the music is worth exploring".

== Track listing ==
All compositions by Eddie Bert, except where indicated.

1. "Bert Tram" – 3:05
2. "One for Tubby" (Joe Puma) – 5:25
3. "It's Only Sunshine" (Puma) – 3:12
4. "Opicana" (Puma) – 3:23
5. "Conversation" – 6:45
6. "Crosstown" – 7:15
7. "Manhattan Suite" – 5:43

- Recorded at Van Gelder Studio, Hackensack, NJ on June 22 (tracks 1–4) & September 1 (tracks 5–7), 1955

== Personnel ==
- Eddie Bert – trombone
- Joe Puma – guitar (tracks 1–4)
- J. R. Monterose – tenor saxophone (tracks 5–7)
- Hank Jones – piano (tracks 5–7)
- Clyde Lombardi – bass
- Kenny Clarke – drums
