= J. R. Monterose (album) =

Studio album by J. R. Monterose
- Released: 1957
- Recorded: October 21, 1956
- Studio: Rudy Van Gelder Studio; Hackensack, NJ
- Genre: Jazz
- Label: Blue Note; BLP 1536
- Producer: Alfred Lion

J. R. Monterose chronology
J. R. Monterose (1957)	The Message (1959)

J. R. Monterose is the debut album by American jazz saxophonist J. R. Monterose, recorded on October 21, 1956 and released on Blue Note the following year. The quintet features trumpeter Ira Sullivan and rhythm section Horace Silver, Wilbur Ware and Philly Joe Jones.

== Reception ==
Professional ratings
Review scores
Source	Rating
AllMusic	4.5/5 stars
The Rolling Stone Jazz Record Guide	4/5 stars

The AllMusic review by Stephen Thomas Erlewine stating, "J. R. Monterose's first session as a leader was a thoroughly enjoyable set of swinging, straight-ahead bop that revealed him as a saxophonist with a knack for powerful, robust leads in the vein of Sonny Rollins and Coleman Hawkins.... In fact, the quality of the music is so strong, J. R. Monterose qualifies as one of the underappreciated gems in Blue Note's mid-'50s catalog."

== Track listing ==
All tracks are written by J. R. Monterose, except as noted.

Side 1
No.	Title	Writer(s)	Length
1.	"Wee-Jay"		6:56
2.	"The Third"	Donald Byrd	5:15
3.	"Bobbie Pin"		8:03

All tracks are written by J. R. Monterose, except as noted.

Side 2
No.	Title	Writer(s)	Length
1.	"Marc V"		6:30
2.	"Ka-Link"	Philly Joe Jones	9:01
3.	"Beauteous"	Paul Chambers	5:24

CD reissue bonus track
No.	Title	Length
7.	"Wee-Jay" (alternate take)	7:17

== Personnel ==
=== Musicians ===
- J. R. Monterose – tenor saxophone
- Ira Sullivan – trumpet
- Horace Silver – piano
- Wilbur Ware – bass
- Philly Joe Jones – drums

=== Technical personnel ===
- Alfred Lion – producer
- Rudy Van Gelder – recording engineer
- Reid Miles – design
- Francis Wolff – photography
- Leonard Feather – liner notes
