= The Jazz Skyline =

Studio album by Milt Jackson
- Released: 1956
- Recorded: January 23, 1956
- Studios: Medallion Studios, Newark, NJ
- Genre: Jazz
- Length: 37:22
- Label: Savoy
- Producer: Herman Lubinsky

Milt Jackson chronology
Django (1956)	The Jazz Skyline (1956)	Jackson's Ville (1956)

The Jazz Skyline is an album by American jazz vibraphonist Milt Jackson featuring performances recorded in 1956 and released on the Savoy label.

== Reception ==
The Allmusic review by Bob Rusch states: "This session has interest as an example of Milt Jackson's mid-'50s work in a non-Modern Jazz Quartet context. And despite the many critical assertions that the vibist was restrained by pianist John Lewis' direction, his playing here revealed no marked change".

Professional ratings
Review scores
Source	Rating
Allmusic	4/5 stars

== Track listing ==
1. "Lover" (Lorenz Hart, Richard Rodgers) - 7:45
2. "Can't Help Lovin' Dat Man" (Oscar Hammerstein II, Jerome Kern) - 4:35
3. "The Lady Is a Tramp" (Hart, Rodgers) - 7:18
4. "Angel Face" (Hank Jones) - 6:38
5. "Sometimes I'm Happy" (Irving Caesar, Vincent Youmans) - 7:15
6. "What's New?" (Johnny Burke, Bob Haggart) - 3:51

== Personnel ==
- Milt Jackson – vibes
- Lucky Thompson – tenor saxophone
- Hank Jones – piano
- Wendell Marshall – bass
- Kenny Clarke – drums
