= Ballads & Blues (Milt Jackson album) =

Studio album by Milt Jackson
- Released: 1956
- Recorded: January 17 & 21, and February 14, 1956
- Studio: New York City and Van Gelder Studio, Hackensack, New Jersey
- Genre: Jazz
- Length: 42:02
- Label: Atlantic; 1242
- Producer: Nesuhi Ertegun

Milt Jackson chronology
Jackson's Ville (1956)	Ballads & Blues (1956)	Fontessa (1956)

Ballads & Blues is an album by the American jazz vibraphonist Milt Jackson of performances recorded in 1956 and released on the Atlantic label.

== Reception ==
Professional ratings
Review scores
Source	Rating
AllMusic	4.5/5 stars
The Penguin Guide to Jazz Recordings	3.5/4 stars

The AllMusic review awarded the album 4½ stars.

The authors of The Penguin Guide to Jazz Recordings called the album "near-perfect Jackson fare," and wrote: "The others mostly keep out of his way and let him blow, although Lucky Thompson is on the final three tracks and in excellent fettle."

Jazz Journal's Derek Ansell stated that the album "makes me want to trot out the tired old cliché – they don't make 'em like this anymore. The trouble is it's true, they really don't."

A reviewer for Billboard commented: "The fans should heartily welcome this 'blowing' session... An excellent set that should sell well."

== Track listing ==
All compositions by Milt Jackson, except as indicated

1. "So in Love" (Cole Porter) – 3:14
2. "These Foolish Things" (Eric Maschwitz, Jack Strachey, Harry Link) – 4:25
3. "Solitude" (Duke Ellington) – 4:43
4. "The Song Is Ended" (Irving Berlin) – 4:40
5. "They Didn't Believe Me" (Jerome Kern, Herbert Reynolds) – 3:45
6. "How High the Moon" (Nancy Hamilton, Morgan Lewis) – 6:13
7. "Gerry's Blues" – 5:02
8. "Hello" – 3:47
9. "Bright Blues" – 6:13

Recorded in New York City on January 17 (tracks 6, 8 & 9) and January 21 (tracks 1, 3 & 5) and at the Van Gelder Studio in Hackensack, New Jersey on February 14 (tracks 2, 4 & 7), 1956

== Personnel ==
=== January 17, 1956 (tracks 6, 8, 9) ===
- Milt Jackson – vibraphone
- Lucky Thompson – tenor saxophone
- Skeeter Best – guitar
- John Lewis – piano
- Oscar Pettiford – bass
- Kenny Clarke – drums

=== January 21, 1956 (tracks 1, 3 & 5) ===
- Milt Jackson – vibraphone
- Barry Galbraith – guitar
- John Lewis – piano
- Oscar Pettiford – bass
- Kenny Clarke – drums
  - Ralph Burns – arranger

=== February 14, 1956 (tracks 2, 4 & 7) ===
- Milt Jackson – vibraphone
- Barney Kessel – guitar
- Percy Heath – bass
- Lawrence Marable – drums
