= Joe Wilder =

American trumpeter

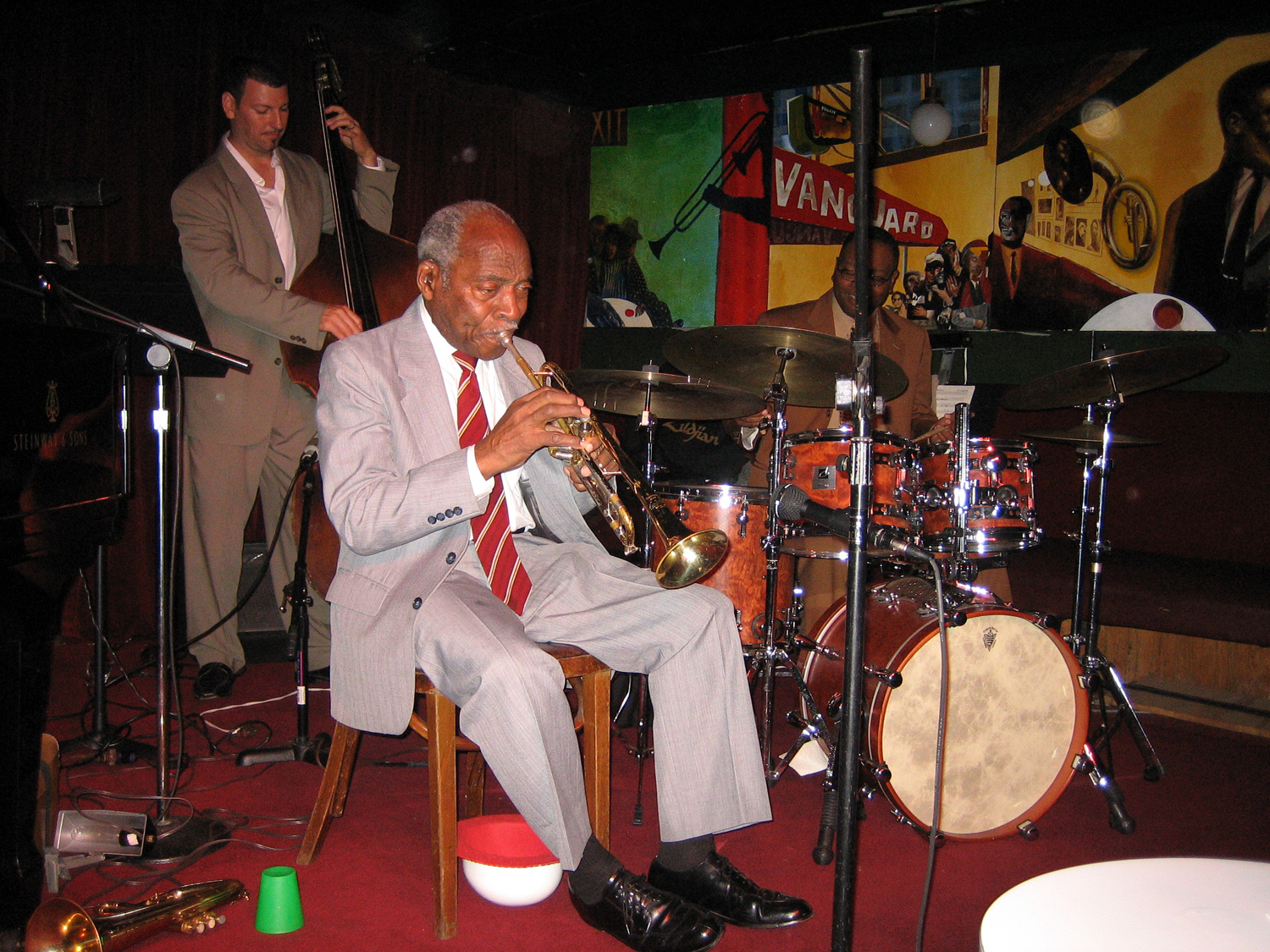
- Left to right: John Webber, Joe Wilder and Lewis Nash

Background information
- Born: February 22, 1922; Colwyn, Pennsylvania, U.S.
- Died: May 9, 2014 (aged 92) New York City, New York, U.S.
- Genres: Jazz, Swing music
- Occupations: Musician, composer
- Instruments: Trumpet, flugelhorn
- Years active: 1940s – 2014
- Labels: Savoy, Columbia, Evening Star

Joseph Benjamin Wilder (February 22, 1922 – May 9, 2014) was an American jazz trumpeter, bandleader, and composer.

Wilder was awarded the Temple University Jazz Master's Hall of Fame Award in 2006. The National Endowment for the Arts honored him with its highest honor in jazz, the NEA Jazz Masters Award for 2008.

== Biography ==
Wilder was born into a musical family led by his father Curtis, a bassist and bandleader in Philadelphia. Wilder's first performances took place on the radio program "Parisian Tailor's Colored Kiddies of the Air". He and the other young musicians were backed up by such illustrious bands as Duke Ellington's and Louis Armstrong's that were also then playing at the Lincoln Theater. Wilder studied at the Mastbaum School of Music in Philadelphia, but turned to jazz when he felt that there was little future for an African-American classical musician. At the age of 19, Wilder joined his first touring big band, Les Hite's band.

Wilder was one of the first thousand African Americans to serve in the Marines during World War II. He worked first in Special Weapons and eventually became Assistant Bandmaster at the headquarters' band. Following the war during the 1940s and early 1950s, he played in the orchestras of Jimmie Lunceford, Herbie Fields, Sam Donahue, Lucky Millinder, Noble Sissle, Dizzy Gillespie, and finally with the Count Basie Orchestra. From 1957 to 1974, Wilder did studio work for ABC-TV, New York City, and in the pit orchestras for Broadway musicals, while building his reputation as a soloist with his albums for Savoy (1956) and Columbia (1959). His Jazz from Peter Gunn (1959), features ten songs from Henry Mancini ("Peter Gunn") television score in melodic and swinging fashion with a quartet. He was also a regular sideman with such musicians as NEA Jazz Masters Hank Jones, Gil Evans, and Benny Goodman. He became a favorite with vocalists and played for Billie Holiday, Lena Horne, Johnny Mathis, Harry Belafonte, Eileen Farrell, Tony Bennett, and many others. Wilder earned a bachelor of music degree in 1953, studying classical trumpet at the Manhattan School of Music with Joseph Alessi, where he was also principal trumpet with the school's symphony orchestra under conductor Jonel Perlea. In the 1960s, he performed on several occasions with the New York Philharmonic under Andre Kostelanetz and Pierre Boulez and played lead for the Symphony Of The New World from 1965 to 1971.

He appeared on The Cosby Show episode "Play It Again, Russell" (1986), and played the trumpet in the Malcolm X Orchestra in Spike Lee's "Malcolm X" (1992). Since 1991 he returned as a leader and recorded three albums for Evening Star. He died on May 9, 2014, in New York City, of congestive heart failure.

== Discography ==
=== As leader ===
Year recorded	Title	Label	Notes
1956	Wilder 'n' Wilder	Savoy	Quartet, with Hank Jones (piano), Wendell Marshall (bass), Kenny Clarke (drums)
1959	The Pretty Sound	Columbia	
1959	Jazz from Peter Gunn	Columbia	
1963	Sonata for Trumpet and Piano	Golden Crest	The composer was Alec Wilder (no relation)
1984	Hangin' Out	Concord	With Joe Newman (trumpet), Hank Jones (piano), Rufus Reid (bass), Marvin "Smitty" Smith (drums)
1991	Alone with Just My Dreams	Evening Star	With James Williams (piano), Remo Palmier (guitar), Jay Leonhart (bass), Sherman Ferguson (drums)
1993	No Greater Love	Evening Star	
2003	Among Friends	Evening Star	

=== As sideman ===
With Yusef Lateef

- 10 Years Hence (Atlantic, 1974)
- The Doctor is In... and Out (Atlantic, 1976)

With John Lewis

- Odds Against Tomorrow (Soundtrack) (United Artists, 1959)
- The Golden Striker (Atlantic, 1960)

With Les McCann

- Comment (Atlantic, 1970)
- Another Beginning (Atlantic, 1974)

With Oliver Nelson

- Encyclopedia of Jazz (Verve, 1966)
- The Sound of Feeling (Verve, 1966)
- The Spirit of '67 with Pee Wee Russell (Impulse!, 1967)

With A. K. Salim

- Flute Suite (Savoy, 1957) with Frank Wess and Herbie Mann
- Blues Suite (Savoy, 1958)

With others

- Trigger Alpert, Trigger Happy! (Riverside, 1956)
- Count Basie, Dance Session (Clef, 1953)
- Louis Bellson and Gene Krupa, The Mighty Two (Roulette, 1963)
- Ruby Braff: Being With You (Arbirs, 1996)
- Ruth Brown, Miss Rhythm (Atlantic, 1959)
- Ralph Burns and Leonard Feather, Winter Sequence (MGM, 1954)
- Charlie Byrd: For Louis' (Concord, 1996)
- Benny Carter, A Gentleman and His Music (Concord, 1985)
- Al Cohn, Four Brass One Tenor (RCA Victor, 1955)
- Tadd Dameron, The Magic Touch (Riverside, 1962)
- Gil Evans, Into the Hot (Impulse!, 1961)
- Dizzy Gillespie, Gillespiana (Verve, 1960)
- Jimmy Giuffre, The Music Man (Atlantic, 1958)
- Urbie Green, All About Urbie Green and His Big Band (ABC-Paramount, 1956)
- Johnny Hartman, Once in Every Life (Bee Hive, 1980)
- Coleman Hawkins, The Hawk Talks (Decca, 1955) – rec. 1952-53
- The Heath Brothers, Jazz Family (Concord, 1998)
- Donna Hightower, Take One (Capitol, 1959)
- Johnny Hodges, Sandy's Gone (Verve, 1963)
- J. J. Johnson, J.J.! (RCA Victor, 1964)
- Etta Jones, From the Heart (Prestige, 1962)
- Hank Jones, Bluebird (Savoy, 1955)
- Quincy Jones, The Birth of a Band! (Mercury, 1959)
- Jay Jay Johnson, The Brass Orchestra (Verve, 1996)
- Mundell Lowe, New Music of Alec Wilder (Riverside, 1956)
- Herbie Mann, Salute to the Flute (Epic, 1957)
- David Newman, The Weapon (Atlantic, 1973)
- Joe Newman, Hangin´ Out (Concord, 1984)
- Anita O'Day, Indestructible! (Kayo Stereophonics, 2006)
- Houston Person, Broken Windows, Empty Hallways (Prestige, 1972)
- Oscar Pettiford, Basically Duke (Bethlehem, 1954)
- Shirley Scott, Great Scott!! (Impulse!, 1964)
- Rex Stewart and Cootie Williams, Porgy & Bess Revisited (Warner Bros., 1959)
- Sonny Stitt, What's New!!! (Roulette, 1966)
- Ernie Wilkins, Top Brass (Savoy, 1955)
