= Meet Milt Jackson =

Studio album by Milt Jackson
- Released: 1956
- Recorded: February 23, 1949, November 1, 1954, February 7, 1955 and January 5, 1956
- Genre: Jazz
- Length: 37:26
- Label: Savoy

Milt Jackson chronology
Roll 'Em Bags (1956)	Meet Milt Jackson (1956)	Django (album) (1956)

Meet Milt Jackson is an album by American jazz vibraphonist Milt Jackson featuring performances recorded between 1949 and 1956 and released on the Savoy label.

== Reception ==
The Allmusic review by Jim Todd stated: "This collection is valuable for its three tracks from Jackson's January 1956 collaborations with Lucky Thompson.".

Professional ratings
Review scores
Source	Rating
Allmusic	3.5/5 stars

== Track listing ==
All compositions by Milt Jackson except as indicated

1. "They Can't Take That Away from Me" (George Gershwin, Ira Gershwin) – 6:39
2. "Soulful" – 7:31
3. "Flamingo" (Ted Grouya, Edmund Anderson) – 3:41
4. "Telefunken Blues" [Take 2] (Kenny Clarke, Ernie Wilkins) – 5:53
5. "I've Lost Your Love" – 3:25
6. "Hearing Bells" – 2:53
7. "Junior" – 2:34
8. "Bluesology" – 2:48
9. "Bubu" – 2:32

- Recorded in New York City on February 23, 1949 (tracks 6–9), in Los Angeles, California on November 1, 1954 (track 5) and in New York City on February 7, 1955 (track 4) and January 5, 1956 (tracks 1–3)

== Personnel ==
- Milt Jackson – vibes, piano, vocals
- Bill Massey – trumpet (tracks 6–9)
- Julius Watkins – French horn (tracks 6–9)
- Frank Morgan – alto saxophone (track 5)
- Walter Benton (track 5), Billy Mitchell (tracks 6–9), Lucky Thompson (tracks 1–3) – tenor saxophone
- Frank Wess – tenor saxophone, flute (track 4)
- Charlie Fowlkes – baritone saxophone (track 4)
- Walter Bishop Jr. (tracks 6–9), Wade Legge (tracks 1–3) – piano
- Nelson Boyd (tracks 6–9), Percy Heath (track 5), Eddie Jones (track 4), Wendell Marshall (tracks 1–3) – bass
- Kenny Clarke (tracks 1–5), Roy Haynes (tracks 6–9) – drums
- Ernie Wilkins – arranger (track 4)
