= The Pretty Sound =

Studio album by Joe Wilder
- Released: October 1959
- Recorded: 1959
- Genre: Jazz
- Length: 40:20
- Label: Columbia; CL 1372

Joe Wilder chronology
Wilder 'n' Wilder (1956)	The Pretty Sound (1959)	Jazz From Peter Gunn (1959)

The Pretty Sound is an album led by jazz trumpeter Joe Wilder recorded in 1959 and first released on the Columbia label.

== Reception ==
Professional ratings
Review scores
Source	Rating
Allmusic	3/5 stars

The Allmusic review by Wade Kergan stated: "Wilder is joined by Urbie Green, Hank Jones, Jerome Richardson, and Herbie Mann on Pretty Sound of Joe Wilder, which lives up to its name on a tasteful selection of ballads and standards".

== Track listing ==
1. "Harbor Lights" (Hugh Williams, Jimmy Kennedy) – 3:39
2. "I Hear Music" (Burton Lane, Frank Loesser) – 3:21
3. "It's So Peaceful in the Country" (Alec Wilder) – 5:02
4. "Autumn in New York" (Vernon Duke) – 5:03
5. "Guys and Dolls" (Loesser) – 4:17
6. "Blue Moon" (Richard Rodgers, Lorenz Hart) – 4:14
7. "Caravan" (Juan Tizol, Duke Ellington) – 4:49
8. "Greensleeves" (Traditional) – 3:30
9. "The Boy Next Door" (Hugh Martin, Ralph Blane) – 3:22
10. "Lullabye" (Johannes Brahms) – 3:03

== Personnel ==
- Joe Wilder – trumpet
- Urbie Green – trombone (tracks 1, 3, 5, 6 & 8–10)
- Herbie Mann – flute (tracks 2, 4 & 7)
- Phil Bodner – English horn, flute, clarinet, saxophone, (tracks 1, 6 & 9)
- Jerome Richardson – clarinet, saxophone (tracks 1, 3, 5, 6 & 8–10)
- Jerry Sanfino – flute, clarinet, saxophone (tracks 3, 5, 8 & 10)
- Hank Jones – piano
- Al Cassamenti – guitar
- George Duvivier – bass (tracks 1, 3, 5, 6 & 8–10)
- Milt Hinton – bass (tracks 2, 4 & 7)
- John Cresci Jr. – drums (tracks 2, 4 & 7)
- Osie Johnson – drums (tracks 3, 5, 8 & 10)
- Don Lamond – drums (tracks 1, 6 & 9)
- Mike Colicchio – arranger
