= The Drum Suite =

Studio album by Manny Albam-Ernie Wilkins and Their Orchestra
- Released: 1956
- Recorded: March 5, 6 & 7, 1956; Webster Hall, NYC
- Genre: Jazz
- Length: 36:52
- Label: RCA Victor; LPM 1279
- Producer: Jack Lewis

Ernie Wilkins chronology
Top Brass (1955)	The Drum Suite (1956)	The Big New Band of the 60's (1960)

The Drum Suite (subtitled A Musical Portrait of Eight Arms from Six Angles) is an album by American jazz composers and arrangers Manny Albam and Ernie Wilkins featuring performances recorded in 1956 and first released on the RCA Victor label. The album was followed by Al Cohn's Son of Drum Suite (RCA Victor, 1960).

== Reception ==
Professional ratings
Review scores
Source	Rating
AllMusic	4/5 stars

The AllMusic review stated "No doubt written to exploit the hi-fi craze in full swing during Ike's presidency, Manny Albams' and Ernie Wilkins' The Drum Suite took the unprecedented step of including parts for four drummers. Inevitably, Albams and Wilkins abandoned the anarchic idea of turning all four drummers loose at the same time; thus these six movements -- divided equally between the two composers -- feature carefully written-out parts for each drummer to follow. ...By keeping things free of gimmickry, Albams/Wilkins created a viable piece of music that, if truth be told, could have been performed acceptably by one drummer." and awarded the album 4 stars.

== Track listing ==
All compositions by Ernie Wilkins except as indicated

1. "First Movement: Dancers on Drums" - 5:20
2. "Second Movement: Bristling" (Manny Albam) - 5:22
3. "Third Movement: Chant of the Witch Doctor" (Albam) - 6:30
4. "Fourth Movement: Skinning the Valves" (Albam) - 6:05
5. "Fifth Movement: Cymbalisms" - 7:35
6. "Sixth Movement: The Octopus" - 6:00

== Personnel ==
- Manny Albam, Ernie Wilkins - arranger, conductor
- Conte Candoli (tracks 3, 4 & 5), Joe Ferrante (track 4), Bernie Glow (track 4), Joe Newman (tracks 1–6), Ernie Royal (track 4) - trumpet
- Jimmy O'Heigho (track 2), Urbie Green (track 3), Fred Ohms (track A3), Tommy Mitchell (track 3), Chauncey Welsch (track 3) - trombone
- John Barrows, Jimmy Buffington - French horn (track 5)
- Al Epstein - English horn (track 3)
- Ray Beckenstein - piccolo (track 3)
- Hal McKusick - alto saxophone (tracks 1, 2 & 4)
- Al Cohn - tenor saxophone, clarinet (tracks 2, 3 & 6)
- Gus Johnson, Osie Johnson, Don Lamond, Teddy Sommer – drums
