= That's Nat =

Studio album by Nat Adderley
- Released: 1955
- Recorded: July 26, 1955
- Studio: Van Gelder, Hackensack, NJ
- Genre: Jazz
- Length: 37:52
- Label: Savoy
- Producer: Bob Shad

Nat Adderley chronology
That's Nat (1955)	Introducing Nat Adderley (1955)

That's Nat is an album by jazz cornetist Nat Adderley, released on the Savoy label. It features performances by Adderley with Jerome Richardson, Hank Jones, Wendell Marshall, and Kenny Clarke.

== Reception ==
Professional ratings
Review scores
Source	Rating
AllMusic	3/5 stars
The Penguin Guide to Jazz	3/4 stars

The Penguin Guide to Jazz states, "Jones comping is inch-perfect throughout and Clarke is right on the case, often following Adderley outside the basic count for a phrase or two". The AllMusic review stated, "His pithy, pungent trumpet and cornet work is effective in a hard bop context, although his own work outside his brother's group has never seemed quite as effective".

== Track listing ==
All compositions by Nat Adderley & Julian "Cannonball" Adderley except where noted

1. "Porky" – 5:15
2. "I Married an Angel" (Lorenz Hart, Richard Rodgers) – 4:32
3. "Big "E"" – 10:40
4. "Kuzzin's Buzzin'" – 5:10
5. "Ann Springs" (Mal Waldron) – 6:17
6. "You Better Go Now" (Robert Graham, Bickley S. Reichmer) – 5:58

== Personnel ==
- Nat Adderley – cornet
- Jerome Richardson – tenor saxophone, flute
- Hank Jones – piano
- Wendell Marshall – bass
- Kenny Clarke – drums
