= Introducing Nat Adderley =

Studio album by Nat Adderley
- Released: 1955
- Recorded: September 6, 1955
- Genre: Jazz
- Label: Wing
- Producer: Bob Shad

Nat Adderley chronology
That's Nat (1955)	Introducing Nat Adderley (1955)	To the Ivy League from Nat (1956)

Introducing Nat Adderley is an album by jazz cornetist Nat Adderley, released on the Wing label. It features performances by Adderley and his brother Julian "Cannonball" Adderley, Horace Silver, Paul Chambers, and Roy Haynes. The album was later released on the Emarcy label and also rereleased on the Limelight label as Them Adderleys

== Reception ==
The AllMusic review by Thom Jurek states, "This is a day in 1955, top to bottom, when some of the finest musicians in the world didn't know it yet. They got together for a good time and a blowing session that became a legendary moment in the history of jazz. Enough said". The All About Jazz review by David Rickert stated, "The Adderley brothers were always at their best working in the hard bop vein... Most of the songs here are skillfully designed to exploit the talents of both, although they are interchangeable with hundreds of other hard bop themes from the era. However, they truly seem to be enjoying themselves here, indulging their love of playing jazz". The Penguin Guide to Jazz stated, "Introducing is a buoyant, exuberant set created by a band who sound as if they have absolutely nothing to prove".

Professional ratings
Review scores
Source	Rating
AllMusic	4/5 stars
The Penguin Guide to Jazz	3/4 stars

== Track listing ==
All compositions by Nat Adderley & Julian "Cannonball" Adderley except as indicated

1. "Watermelon" - 2:47
2. "Little Joanie Walks" - 4:06
3. "Two Brothers" - 3:32
4. "I Should Care" (Axel Stordahl, Paul Weston, Sammy Cahn) - 4:28
5. "Crazy Baby" - 6:03
6. "New Arrivals" - 6:43
7. "Sun Dance" - 3:53
8. "Fort Lauderdale" - 3:22
9. "Friday Nite" - 3:16
10. "Blues for Bohemia" - 5:25

- Recorded in New York City on September 6, 1955

== Personnel ==
- Nat Adderley – cornet
- Cannonball Adderley - alto saxophone
- Horace Silver - piano
- Paul Chambers - bass
- Roy Haynes - drums
