= Eddie Bert =

American jazz trombonist (1922–2012)

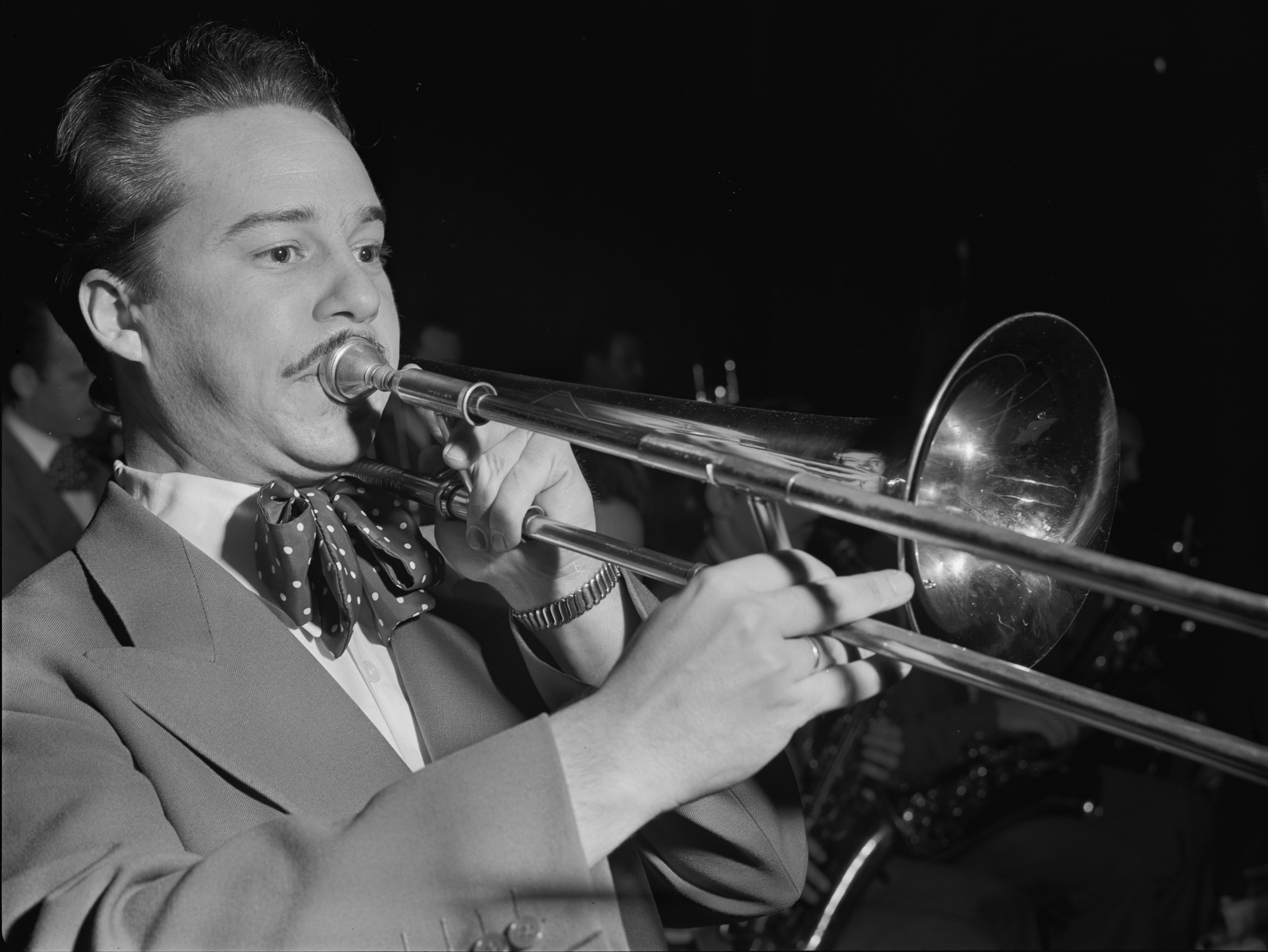

Background information
- Born: Edward Joseph Bertolatus; May 16, 1922; Yonkers, New York, U.S.
- Died: September 27, 2012 (aged 90) Danbury, Connecticut, U.S.
- Genres: Jazz, swing, avant-garde
- Occupation: Musician
- Instrument: Trombone
- Website: www.eddiebert.com

Edward Joseph Bertolatus (May 16, 1922 – September 27, 2012), also known as Eddie Bert, was an American jazz trombonist.

== Music career ==
He was born in Yonkers, New York, United States. Bert received a degree and a teaching license from the Manhattan School of Music (1957). He taught at Essex College, University of Bridgeport, and Western Connecticut State University.

Bert performed and recorded with many bands and orchestras. He spent the most time with Benny Goodman's Orchestra (1958–86), Charles Mingus (1955–74), The Thad Jones/Mel Lewis Orchestra (1968–72), New York Jazz Repertory Company (1973–78), The American Jazz Orchestra (1986–92), Loren Schoenberg Orchestra (1986–2001), and Walt Levinsky's Great American Swing Orchestra (1987–95).

Bert is featured on hundreds of recordings and recorded extensively as a leader on various labels including Savoy, Blue Note, Trans-World, Jazztone, and Discovery Records. Bert continued to play sold-out shows until his death, at the age of 90, on September 27, 2012, in Danbury, Connecticut.

His photography can be seen on Jazz Giants, To Bird with Love (Chan Parker and F. Paudras), and The Band that Never Was (Spotlight Records, album cover and liner notes).

== Honors ==
- Musician of the Year, Metronome magazine, 1955
- Grammy for Musician of the Year, 1959
- Honored at Town Hall, New York City, May 16, 2002
- Honored at Jazz at the Kennedy Center with Billy Taylor, May 6, 2002
- Rugers University Jazz Hall of Fame, 2009

== Discography ==
=== As leader ===
- Encore (Savoy, 1955)
- Let's Dig Bert (Eddie That Is) (Trans-World, 1955)
- Musician of the Year (Savoy, 1955)
- Montage (Savoy, 1955)
- Modern Moods (Jazztone, 1955)
- East Coast Sounds with Billy Byers & Joe Newman (Jazztone, 1957)
- Like Cool (Somerset, 1958)
- Skeleton of the Band (Backbone, 1979)
- Kaleidoscope (Savoy, 1987)
- The Human Factor (Fresh Sound, 1988)
- Live at Birdland (Fresh Sound, 1992)
- Live at Capozzoli's (Woofy, 1999)

=== As sideman ===
With Chris Connor

- Chris Connor Sings the George Gershwin Almanac of Song (Atlantic, 1957)
- I Miss You So (Atlantic, 1957)
- Sings Ballads of the Sad Cafe (Atlantic, 1959)

With Urbie Green

- The Persuasive Trombone of Urbie Green (Command, 1960)
- 21 Trombones (Project 3, 1967)
- 21 Trombones Rock & Blues & Jazz Vol. Two (Project 3, 1969)
- The Message (RCA, 1986)

With Thad Jones & Mel Lewis

- Central Park North (Solid State, 1969)
- Consummation (Blue Note, 1970)
- Suite for Pops (A&M, 1975)
- Thad Jones & Mel Lewis (Blue Note, 1975)
- Thad Jones & Mel Lewis (LRC, 1990)
- Paris 1969 Vol. 1 (Royal, 1990)
- Basle 1969 (TCB, 1996)
- The Groove Merchant (LaserLight 1999)

With Stan Kenton

- A Presentation of Progressive Jazz (Capitol, 1948)
- Encores (Capitol, 1949)
- Stan Kenton's Milestones (Capitol, 1950)
- Stan Kenton Classics (Capitol, 1952)
- The Kenton Era (Capitol, 1955)
- Popular Favorites by Stan Kenton (Capitol, 1955)
- Artistry in Rhythm (Capitol, 1955)

With Elliot Lawrence

- Plays Gerry Mulligan Arrangements (Fantasy, 1956)
- Plays Tiny Kahn and Johnny Mandel Arrangements (Fantasy, 1956)
- Swinging at the Steel Pier (Vogue, 1956)
- Big Band Modern (Jazztone, 1957)

With Charles Mingus

- Mingus at the Bohemia (Debut, 1955 [1956])
- Pre-Bird (Mercury, 1961)
- The Charles Mingus Quintet & Max Roach (Fantasy, 1955 [1964])
- Charles Mingus and Friends in Concert (Columbia, 1973)
- The Complete Town Hall Concert (Blue Note, 1983)
- Shoes of the Fisherman's Wife (Columbia, 1988)
- Epitaph (Columbia, 1989)

With Thelonious Monk

- At Town Hall (Riverside, 1959)
- Big Band and Quartet in Concert (Columbia, 1964)
- In Person (Milestone, 1976)
- Always Know (Columbia, 1979)
- The Thelonious Monk Memorial Album (Milestone, 1982)

With Red Norvo

- Jazz Concert (Jazztone, 1956)
- Town Hall Concert Vol. 1 (London, 1974)
- Live from the Blue Gardens (MusicMasters, 1992)

With Chico O'Farrill

- Jazz (Clef, 1953)
- 2nd Afro Cuban Suite (Norgran, 1954)
- Cuban Blues (Verve, 1996)

With Buddy Rich

- Richcraft (Mercury, 1959)
- The Rich Rebellion (Mercury, 1970)
- Both Sides (Mercury, 1976)
- Buddy Rich (Verve, 1987)

With Sal Salvador

- Shades of Sal Salvador (Bethlehem, 1957)
- Colors in Sound (Decca, 1958)
- The Beat for This Generation (Decca, 1959)
- Starfingers (Bee Hive, 1978)

With Loren Schoenberg

- Time Waits for No One (MusicMasters, 1987)
- Solid Ground (MusicMasters, 1988)
- Just A-Settin' and A-Rockin (MusicMasters, 1990)
- Out of This World (TCB, 1998)

With Bobby Short

- Celebrating 30 Years at the Cafe Carlyle (Telarc, 1997)
- How's Your Romance? (Telarc, 1999)
- You're the Top (Telarc, 1999)

With others

- Manny Albam, Brass on Fire (Solid State, 1966)
- American Jazz Orchestra, Ellington Masterpieces (EastWest, 1989)
- American Jazz Orchestra, The Music of Jimmie Lunceford (MusicMasters, 1991)
- Mildred Bailey, Her Greatest Performances 1929–1946 (Columbia, 1962)
- Charlie Barnet, Sky Liner (MCA, 1976)
- Charlie Barnet, Drop Me Off in Harlem (GRP/Decca, 1992)
- Louis Bellson, Drummer's Holiday (Verve, 1956)
- Bob Brookmeyer & Jimmy Cleveland & Frank Rosolino, The Trombones Inc. (Lone Hill, 1959)
- Kenny Burrell, Bluesin' Around (Columbia, 1983)
- Artie Butler, Have You Met Miss Jones? (A&M/CTI, 1968)
- Benny Carter, Central City Sketches (MusicMasters, 1987)
- Benny Carter, Harlem Renaissance (MusicMasters, 1992)
- Ron Carter, Empire Jazz (RSO, 1980)
- Teddy Charles, Word from Bird (Atlantic, 1957)
- Kenny Clarke & Ernie Wilkins, Kenny Clarke & Ernie Wilkins (Savoy, 1955)
- Al Cohn, East Coast West Coast Scene (RCA, Victor, 1955)
- Al Jazzbo Collins, Presents Swinging at The Opera (Everest, 1960)
- Neil Diamond, The Bang Years 1966-1968 (Columbia/Legacy 2011)
- Larry Elgart, Flight of the Condor (RCA, Victor, 1981)
- Bill Evans & Bob Brookmeyer, The Ivory Hunters (United Artists, 1959)
- Maynard Ferguson, Birdland Dream Band (Vik, 1957)
- Herbie Fields, Blow Hot Blow Cool (Decca, 1955)
- George Gee, Swingin' at Swing City Zurich (Zort Music 2003)
- George Gee, Setting the Pace (GJazz 2004)
- Stan Getz, Plays Music from the Soundtrack of Mickey One (Verve, 1965)
- Benny Goodman, Bebop Spoken Here (Capitol, 1972)
- Benny Goodman, Benny's Bop (Hep, 1987)
- Al Haig, Al Haig Meets the Master Saxes Vol. One (Spotlite, 1977)
- Lionel Hampton, Silver Vibes (Columbia, 1960)
- Lionel Hampton, At Newport '78 (Timeless, 1980)
- Bill Harris, Your Blase & Bill Not Phil (Mercury, 1952)
- Bill Harris, Bill Harris Herd (Norgran, 1956)
- Gene Harris, Live at Town Hall N.Y.C. (Concord Jazz, 1989)
- Coleman Hawkins, Accent on Tenor Sax (Urania, 1955)
- Jimmy Heath, Little Man Big Band (Verve, 1992)
- Woody Herman, The Turning Point (Coral, 1969)
- Woody Herman, Second Herd (Capitol, 1982)
- Janis Ian, Between the Lines (Columbia, 1975)
- Willis Jackson, Plays with Feeling (Cotillion, 1976)
- Bob James, Two (CTI, 1975)
- J.J. Johnson & Kai Winding, Jay and Kai + 6 (Columbia, 1956)
- J.J. Johnson & Kai Winding, Jay and Kai (Fontana, 1959)
- Duke Jordan, Duke Jordan Trio and Quintet (Signal, 1955)
- Beverly Kenney, Like Yesterday (Decca, 1959)
- Lee Konitz, You and Lee (Verve, 1991)
- Gene Krupa, Gene Krupa Plays Gerry Mulligan Arrangements (American Jazz Classics 1959)
- Michel Legrand, Legrand Jazz (Columbia, 1958)
- Michel Legrand, Michel Legrand Meets Miles Davis (Philips, 1970)
- O'Donel Levy, Dawn of a New Day (Groove Merchant, 1973)
- Pat Lundy, The Lady Has Arrived! (Pyramid, 1976)
- Machito, Kenya (Roulette, 1958)
- Teo Macero, What's New? (Columbia, 1956)
- Teo Macero, Impressions of Charles Mingus (Palo Alto, 1983)
- Jimmy McGriff, The Big Band (Solid State, 1966)
- Jimmy McGriff, Tribute to Basie Funkiest Little Band in the Land (LRC, 1992)
- Meco, The Wizard of Oz (Milenium, 1978)
- Phil Medley, Happy Walk (Pyramid, 1976)
- Gil Melle, Gil Mellé Quintet/Sextet (Blue Note, 1953)
- Gil Melle, New Faces New Sounds (Blue Note, 1953)
- Gil Melle, Patterns in Jazz (Blue Note, 1956)
- Metronome All-Stars, Metronome All-Stars 1956 (Verve, 1956)
- Garnet Mimms, Has It All (Arista, 1978)
- T. S. Monk, Monk on Monk (N2K, 1997)
- Gerry Mulligan & Bob Brookmeyer, Jazz Concerto Grosso (ABC-Paramount, 1958)
- Babatunde Olatunji, Soul Makossa (Paramount, 1973)
- Oscar Pettiford, New York City 1955–1958 (Uptown, 2017)
- Nat Pierce, The Ballad of Jazz Street (Zim, 1980)
- Tito Rodriguez, Mambo Gee Gee (Tumbao Cuban Classics, 1992)
- Roswell Rudd, Trombone Tribe (Sunnyside, 2009)
- Pete Rugolo, Rugolomania (Columbia, 1955)
- Pete Rugolo, New Sounds by Pete Rugolo (Harmony, 1957)
- Bill Russo, School of Rebellion (Roulette, 1960)
- Bill Russo, Seven Deadly Sins (Roulette, 1960)
- Bobby Scott, The Compositions of Bobby Scott (Fresh Sound, 2020)
- Frank Socolow, Sounds by Socolow (London, 1957)
- Marlena Shaw, Take a Bite (Columbia, 1979)
- Carly Simon, Boys in the Trees (Elektra, 1978)
- Dakota Staton, I Want a Country Man (Groove Merchant, 1973)
- Rex Stewart &Cootie Williams, Porgy & Bess Revisited (Warner Bros., 1958)
- Tom Talbert, Bix Duke Fats (Atlantic, 1957)
- Tom Talbert, This Is Living! (Chartmaker, 1997)
- Clark Terry, Live! at Buddy's Place (Vanguard, 1976)
- Teri Thornton, Teri Thornton Sings Open Highway (Koch, 2001)

== Broadway shows and movies ==
- Jam Session with Charlie Barnett (1943) (movie)
- Bye Bye Birdie, 1960
- How to Succeed in Business Without Really Trying, 1961
- Here's Love, 1963
- Golden Boy, 1964
- The Apple Tree, 1965
- Golden Rainbow, 1968
- The French Connection (1971) (movie)
- Pippin, 1972–77
- Ain't Misbehavin', 1978–82
- Human Comedy, 1984–85
- Uptown... It's Hot!, 1986
- School Daze (1987) (movie)

== Sources ==
- JazzWax, four-part interview with Eddie Bert in 2007. Additional parts are linked above the red date at the top of Part 1.
- Cook, Richard; Morton, Brian (2004). The Penguin Guide To Jazz on CD (7th ed.). London: Penguin Books. ISBN 978-0141014166.
