= Claude Black (musician) =

American jazz pianist (1932–2013)

- Born: October 24, 1932; Detroit, Michigan, U.S.
- Died: January 17, 2013 (aged 80) Toledo, Ohio, U.S.
- Genres: Jazz
- Instrument: Piano

Claude Black (October 24, 1932 – January 17, 2013) was an American jazz pianist who performed with Stan Getz, Charlie Parker, Wes Montgomery, Sonny Stitt, Aretha Franklin and, for the last few decades of his life, with bassist Clifford Murphy.

== Background ==
Black was born in Detroit. He began his jazz career in 1948, but his big success came in 1965, when he began a tour with Aretha Franklin. Black died on January 17, 2013, at the age of 80, after suffering from cancer for a long time.
