= Valdo Williams =

Canadian jazz pianist (1928–2010)

Valdo O. Williams (March 30, 1928 – July 8, 2010) was a Canadian post-bop free jazz pianist best known for his trio work with Reggie Johnson and Stu Martin. Williams recorded for the Savoy record label in a trio setting in 1966. They released one album, entitled New Advanced Jazz. AllMusic's review of New Advanced Jazz comments on Williams "performing free jazz that has a strong forward movement and generally swings."

Williams appeared on Canadian television accompanying saxophonists Charlie Parker in the 1950s and Hal Singer in the 1960s.

== Discography ==
- New Advanced Jazz (Savoy, 1966)
