= Bohemia After Dark =

Studio album by Kenny Clarke
- Released: September 1955
- Recorded: June 28 & July 14, 1955
- Studio: Van Gelder Studio, Hackensack, NJ
- Genre: Jazz
- Length: 41:38
- Label: Savoy
- Producer: Ozzie Cadena

Kenny Clarke chronology
Kenny Clarke & Ernie Wilkins (1955)	Bohemia After Dark (1955)	Klook's Clique (1956)

Reissue cover

Professional ratings
Review scores
Source	Rating
Allmusic	4/5 stars
The Penguin Guide to Jazz Recordings	3/4 stars

Bohemia After Dark is an album by jazz drummer Kenny Clarke, featuring the earliest recordings with Cannonball Adderley and Nat Adderley. It was released by Savoy Records in September 1955.

The album, and its first track, are titled after the Café Bohemia a restaurant where, between 1955 and 1960, jazz live sessions were held.

== Reception ==
The Allmusic review by Scott Yanow states: "Although drummer Kenny Clarke is the nominal leader and the other sidemen include trumpeter Donald Byrd, Jerome Richardson on tenor and flute, pianist Horace Silver and bassist Paul Chambers, the impressive performance by the young Adderleys makes this a historic session that has often been reissued under Cannonball's name".

== Track listing ==
All compositions by Julian "Cannonball" Adderley & Nat Adderley, except where indicated.

1. "Bohemia After Dark" (Oscar Pettiford) – 6:06
2. "Chasm" – 4:18
3. "Willow Weep for Me" (Ann Ronell) – 6:18
4. “Late Entry" – 6:56
5. "Hear Me Talkin' to Ya" – 3:12
6. "With Apologies to Oscar" – 9:06
7. "We'll Be Together Again" (Carl T. Fischer, Frankie Laine) – 5:42

- Recorded on June 28 (tracks 1–5 & 7), and July 14 (track 6), 1955

== Personnel ==
- Kenny Clarke – drums
- Cannonball Adderley – alto saxophone feature track 3, not on track 7
- Nat Adderley – cornet feature track 7
- Donald Byrd – trumpet tracks 1,2 and 5
- Jerome Richardson – tenor saxophone, or flute tracks 1,2 and 4
- Horace Silver – piano (tracks 1–6)
- Hank Jones – piano (track 7)
- Paul Chambers – bass
