= Wilbur Harden =

American jazz trumpeter (1924–1969)

Background information
- Born: Wilbur Harden; December 31, 1924; Birmingham, Alabama, U.S.
- Died: June 10, 1969 (aged 44) New York City, U.S.
- Genres: Hard bop; post-bop
- Occupations: Musician; composer
- Instruments: Trumpet; flugelhorn
- Years active: 1950s–1960
- Labels: Savoy; Prestige; New Jazz
- Formerly of: John Coltrane; Yusef Lateef; Curtis Fuller

Wilbur Harden (December 31, 1924, in Birmingham, Alabama – June 10, 1969, in New York City) was an American jazz trumpeter, flugelhornist, and composer.

Harden is best remembered for his recordings with saxophonists Yusef Lateef and John Coltrane, and with trombonist Curtis Fuller. One of the earliest jazz trumpeters to double on flugelhorn, he began his career with Roy Brown (recording R&B in 1950) and Ivory Joe Hunter, before moving to Detroit in 1957 to play with Yusef Lateef's quintet. His music career ended in 1960 due to health problems.

He is a 1991 inductee of the Alabama Jazz Hall of Fame.

== Discography ==
=== As leader ===
- 1958: The King and I (Savoy)
- 1958: Mainstream 1958 (Savoy)
- 1958: Jazz Way Out (Savoy)
- 1958: Tanganyika Strut (Savoy)

Compilations

- 1958: Dial Africa: The Savoy Sessions (Savoy, 1977)
- 1958: Gold Coast (Savoy, 1977)
- 1958: Countdown: The Savoy Sessions (Savoy, 1978)
- 1958: The Complete Savoy Sessions (Savoy, 1999)
- 1958: The Complete Mainstream 1958 Sessions (Savoy, 2009)

=== As sideman ===
With John Coltrane

- Stardust (Prestige, 1958 [1963])
- Standard Coltrane (Prestige, 1958 [1962])
- The Master (Prestige, 1958 [1970])
- Bahia (Prestige, 1958 [1965])

With Curtis Fuller

- Images of Curtis Fuller (Savoy, 1960)

With Yusef Lateef

- Jazz and the Sounds of Nature (Savoy, 1957 [1958])
- Prayer to the East (Savoy, 1957)
- The Sounds of Yusef (Prestige, 1957 [1958])
- Other Sounds (New Jazz, 1957 [1959])
- Cry! – Tender (New Jazz, 1957 [1960])
