= Jazz Way Out =

Studio album by Wilbur Harden and John Coltrane
- Released: 1958
- Recorded: June 24, 1958; Van Gelder Studio, Hackensack
- Genre: Jazz
- Length: 28:47
- Labels: Savoy; MG 12131
- Producer: Ozzie Cadena

Wilbur Harden and John Coltrane chronology
Mainstream 1958: The East Coast Jazz Scene (1958)	Jazz Way Out (1958)	Tanganyika Strut (1958)

Alternative cover
- Reissue cover

Professional ratings
Review scores
Source	Rating
AllMusic	3/5 stars
The Penguin Guide to Jazz	3.5/4 stars

Jazz Way Out is an album by jazz musicians Wilbur Harden and John Coltrane, the second of three 1958 Savoy recordings featuring Harden and Coltrane together as leaders. The session also produced an alternate take of "Dial Africa", which can be found on some compilations, most notably the ones featuring the complete Savoy recordings made by Harden and Coltrane together, The Complete Mainstream 1958 Sessions (2009) and The Complete Savoy Sessions (1999).

== Track listing ==
No.	Title	Writer(s)	Length
1.	"Dial Africa"	Wilbur Harden	8:42
2.	"Oomba"	Wilbur Harden	5:31
3.	"Gold Coast"	Curtis Fuller	14:34
Total length:			28:47

== Personnel ==
- Wilbur Harden - trumpet/flugelhorn
- John Coltrane - tenor saxophone
- Curtis Fuller - trombone
- Tommy Flanagan - piano
- Ali Jackson - bass
- Art Taylor - drums
