= Tanganyika Strut =

Studio album by Wilbur Harden and John Coltrane
- Released: 1958
- Recorded: May 13 and June 24, 1958; Van Gelder Studio, Hackensack, New Jersey
- Genre: Jazz
- Length: 29:09
- Labels: Savoy; MG 12136
- Producer: Ozzie Cadena

Wilbur Harden and John Coltrane chronology
Jazz Way Out (1958)	Tanganyika Strut (1958)

Tanganyika Strut is the last of the three 1958 Savoy recordings made by jazz musicians John Coltrane and Wilbur Harden. The album features the two men as leaders, and is Harden's final as a leader. The sessions also produced a couple of alternate takes which can be found on some compilations, most notably the ones featuring the complete Savoy recordings made by Harden and Coltrane together, The Complete Mainstream 1958 Sessions (2009) and The Complete Savoy Sessions (1999).

== Track listing ==
Tracks were recorded on June 24 (#1) and May 13 (all others), 1958.

=== Side A ===
No.	Title	Writer(s)	Length
1.	"Tanganyika Strut"	Curtis Fuller	9:57
2.	"B.J."	Wilbur Harden	4:32
Total length:			14:29

=== Side B ===
No.	Title	Writer(s)	Length
1.	"Anedac"	Wilbur Harden	5:12
2.	"Once in a While"	Michael Edwards (m), Bud Green (w)	9:28
Total length:			14:40 29:09

== Personnel ==
- Wilbur Harden – trumpet, flugelhorn
- John Coltrane – tenor saxophone
- Curtis Fuller – trombone
- Art Taylor – drums
- Ali Jackson – bass
- Tommy Flanagan – piano (A1)
- Howard Williams – piano (A2, B1, B2)
