= Savoy Records =

American record label

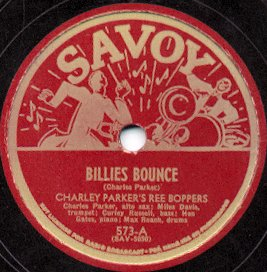
- Savoy disc from the 1940s
- Parent company: Concord
- Founded: 1942; 84 years ago
- Founder: Herman Lubinsky
- Distributor: Universal Music Group
- Genre: Jazz, R&B, gospel
- Country of origin: U.S.
- Location: Newark, New Jersey

Savoy Records is an American record company and label established by Herman Lubinsky in 1942 in Newark, New Jersey. Savoy specialized in jazz, rhythm and blues, and gospel music.

In September 2017, Savoy was acquired by Concord Bicycle Music.

== History ==
In the 1940s, Savoy recorded some of the biggest names in jazz, including Charlie Parker, Erroll Garner, Dexter Gordon, J. J. Johnson, Fats Navarro, and Miles Davis. In 1948, it began buying other labels: Bop, Discovery, National, and Regent. It also reissued music from Jewel Records. In the early 1960s, Savoy briefly recorded several avant-garde jazz artists. These included Paul Bley, Bill Dixon, Charles Moffett, Perry Robinson, Archie Shepp, Sun Ra, Marzette Watts, and Valdo Williams.

After Lubinsky's death in 1974, Clive Davis, then manager of Arista Records, acquired Savoy's catalogue. After that, Joe Fields of Muse Records purchased the catalogue from Arista. In 1986, Malaco Records acquired Savoy's black gospel titles and contracts.

In 1991, Nippon Columbia acquired Savoy and its library, and distributed Savoy releases through its wholly owned subsidiary, Savoy Jazz. In 2003, Savoy Jazz acquired the rights to the Muse and Landmark catalogues from 32 Jazz. In 2009, the label entered a distribution arrangement with Warner Music Group. Savoy included the rock imprint 429 Records.

Many of the label's African American artists begrudged the label's founder, Herman Lubinsky, feeling underpaid for their work. Tiny Price, a journalist for the African American newspaper The Newark Herald News, said of Savoy and Lubinsky:

There's no doubt everybody hated Herman Lubinsky. If he messed with you, you were messed. At the same time, some of those people, many of them Newark's top singers and musicians, would never have been exposed on records if he didn't do what he did. Except for Lubinsky, all the hot little numbers, like Buddy Johnson's "Cherry", would have been lost. The man may have been hated, but he saved a lot of our history for us and for future generations.

Savoy's artistic directors included Buck Ram, Teddy Reig, Ralph Bass (1948–1952), Fred Mendelsohn (1953), and Ozzie Cadena (1954–1962).

== Discography ==
The following are 12" LPs and have the prefix MG.

Cat	Artist	Album
12000	Charlie Parker	Memorial 1
12001	Charlie Parker	Immortal Charlie Parker, The
12002	Erroll Garner	Penthouse Serenade
12003	Erroll Garner	Serenade to Laura
12004	Marian McPartland	At Storyville/At the Hickory House
12005	Marian McPartland	Lullaby of Birdland
12006	Kenny Clarke	Telefunken Blues
12007	Kenny Clarke and Ernie Wilkins	Kenny Clarke & Ernie Wilkins
12008	Erroll Garner/Billy Taylor	Back to Back
12009	Charlie Parker	Memorial 1
12010	J. J. Johnson and Kai Winding	Jay and Kai
12011	Fats Navarro	Fats, Bud, Klook, Sonny, Kinney
12012	Dexter Gordon and Wardell Gray	Jazz Concert – West Coast
12013	Coleman Hawkins	The Hawk Returns
12014	Charlie Parker	Genius of Parker
12015	Eddie Bert	Musician of the Year
12016	Marian McPartland/George Shearing	Great Britain's Marian McPartland & George Shearing
12017	Kenny Clarke	Bohemia After Dark
12018	Cannonball Adderley	Presenting Cannonball Adderley
12019	Eddie Bert	Encore
12020	Dizzy Gillespie	Groovin' High
12021	Nat Adderley	That's Nat
12022	Ernie Wilkins and Frank Wess	Flutes & Reeds
12023	Hank Jones	The Trio
12024	Ray McKinley	Borderline
12025	Boyd Raeburn	Man with the Horns
12026	Howard McGhee and Milt Jackson	Howard McGhee and Milt Jackson
12027	Jimmy Scott	Very Truly Yours
12028	John Mehegan	Reflections
12029	Eddie Bert/John Mehegan/Donald Byrd	Montage
12030	Chuz Alfred, Ola Hanson and Chuck Lee	Jazz Young Blood
12031	LaVergne Smith	New Orleans Nightingale
12032	Donald Byrd	Byrd's Word
12033	Al Caiola	Deep in a Dream
12034	Pee Wee Russell	Jazz at Storyville 1
12035	Wild Bill Davison	At Storyville
12036	Milt Jackson	Opus de Jazz
12037	Hank Jones	Quartet-Quintet
12038	Mutt Carey and Punch Miller	New Orleans Jazz 1
12039	Joe Roland	Joltin' Joe Roland
12040	Boyd Raeburn	Boyd Meets Stravinsky
12041	Various Artists	Jazz at Storyville 2
12042	Milt Jackson	Roll 'Em Bags
12043	Various Artists	The Jazz Keyboard
12044	Ernie Wilkins	Top Brass
12045	Charles Mingus	Jazz Composers Workshop
12046	Modern Jazz Quartet	The Quartet
12047	Dizzy Gillespie	The Champ
12048	Al Cohn	Al Cohn's Tones
12049	John Mehegan and Eddie Costa	A Pair of Pianos
12050	Mutt Carey and Punch Miller	New Orleans Jazz 2
12051	Mike Cuozzo	Mighty Mike
12052	Johnny Costa	The Amazing Johnny Costa
12053	Hank Jones	The Trio with Guests
12054	Cal Tjader/Don Elliot	Vibrations
12055	Wild Bill Davison	Ringside at Condon's
12056	Phil Urso	The Philosophy of Urso
12057	Al Caiola	Serenade in Blue
12058	Marlene VerPlanck	I Think of You
12059	Jazz Composers Workshop	Jazz Composers Workshop 2
12060	Various Artists	Singin' & Swingin′
12061	Milt Jackson	Meet Milt Jackson
12062	Terry Gibbs	Swing, Not Spring
12063	Joe Wilder	Wilder 'n' Wilder
12064	Hank Mobley	The Jazz Message of Hank Mobley
12065	Kenny Clarke	Klook's Clique
12066	Herbie Brock	Solo
12067	Slam Stewart	Bowin' Singin' Slam
12068	Lester Young	Blue Lester
12069	Herbie Brock	Brock's Tops
12070	Milt Jackson	The Jazz Skyline
12071	Lester Young	The Master's Touch
12072	Frank Wess	North, South, East....Wess
12073	Mort Herbert	Night People
12074	Kai Winding	Loaded
12075	Ronnie Ball	All About Ronnie
12076	John Mehegan	How I Play Jazz Piano
12077	Chuck Wayne	The Jazz Guitarist
12078	Frank Foster	No 'Count
12079	Charlie Parker	Story
12080	Milt Jackson	Jackson's Ville
12081	George Wallington	Trio
12082	Johnny Coates	Portrait
12083	Kenny Clarke	Jazzmen: Detroit
12084	Jones, Hank	Have You Met Hank Jones
12085	Frank Wess and Kenny Burrell	Opus in Swing
12086	Frank Wess	Trombones
12087	Hank Jones	Hank Jones' Quartet
12088	Red Norvo	Move!
12089	Art Pepper	Surf Ride
12090	Ben Pollack	Dixieland (Pick-a-rib Boys)
12091	Lee Morgan	Introducing Lee Morgan
12092	Hank Mobley	Jazz Message No. 2
12093	Red Norvo/George Shearing	Midnight on Cloud 69
12094	Paul Smith	By the Fireside
12095	Frank Wess	Jazz for Playboys
12096	Ernie Wilkins	Trumpets All Out
12097	Marian McPartland	Lookin' for a Boy
12098	Georgie Auld/Bobby Sherwood	Jumpin' Bands, The (never issued)
12099	Charlie Byrd	Jazz Recital
12100	Various Artists	I Just Love Jazz Piano (Pianos: Down & Out)
12101	Billy Ver Planck	Dancing Jazz
12102	A. K. Salim	Flute Suite
12103	Yusef Lateef	Jazz Mood
12104	Andre Hodeir	Essais
12105	Stan Getz	Lestorian Mode
12106	J.J. Johnson	J. J. Johnson's Jazz Quintets
12107	Herbie Mann	Mann Alone
12108	Herbie Mann	Yardbird Suite
12109	Yusef Lateef	Jazz for the Thinker
12110	Dizzy Gillespie	Dizzy Gillespie Story
12111	Dizzy Reece and Tubby Hayes	Changing the Jazz at Buckingham Palace
12112	Sahib Shihab/Herbie Mann	The Jazz We Heard Last Summer
12113	Andre Hodeir	The Paris Scene
12114	Stan Getz	Opus De Bop
12115	A. K. Salim/Yusef Lateef	Stable Mates
12116	Charlie Byrd	Blues for Night People
12117	Yusef Lateef	Prayer to the East
12118	A. K. Salim	Pretty for the People
12119	Various Artists	In the Beginning ... Bebop!
12120	Yusef Lateef	Jazz and the Sounds of Nature
12121	Billy Ver Planck	Jazz for Playgirls
12122	George Wallington	Jazz at Hotchikiss
12123	Frank Wess	Jazz Is Busting Out All Over!
12124	Sahib Shihab	Jazz Sahib
12125	Various Artists	Many Faces of Blues, The
12126	Various Artists	Jazz Hour, The
12127	Wilbur Harden	Mainstream 1958
12128	Bobby Donaldson	Dixieland Jazz Party
12129	Various Artists	Jazz Carousel, A (never issued)
12130	Dexter Gordon	Dexter Rides Again
12131	Wilbur Harden	Jazz Way Out
12132	A. K. Salim	Blues Suite
12133	Fats Navarro	Nostalgia
12134	Wilbur Harden	Plays the King and I
12135	Various Artists	Gift of Jazz
12136	Wilbur Harden	Tanganyika Strut
12137	Gigi Gryce	Nica's Tempo
12138	Various Artists	Bird's Night
12139	Yusef Lateef	Dreamer
12140	Yusef Lateef f	The Fabric of Jazz
12141	Curtis Fuller	Blues-ette
12142	Frank Wess	Opus de Blues
12143	Curtis Fuller	The Curtis Fuller Jazztet
12144	Curtis Fuller	Imagination
12145	Duke Jordan/Hall Overton	Do-It-Yourself Jazz
12146	Gigi Gryce	Do-It-Yourself Jazz
12147	Cecil Payne	Patterns of Jazz
12148	Red Rodney	Fiery
12150	Jimmy Scott	The Fabulous Jimmy Scott
12151	Curtis Fuller	(never issued)
12152	Charlie Parker	An Evening at Home
12153	Miles Davis	Miles Ahead (never issued)
12154	Booker Ervin	Cookin'
12155	Lester Young	Jazz Immortal Series 2
12156	Johnny Rae	Opus De Jazz 2
12157	Tony Argo	Jazz Argo
12158	Bucky Pizzarelli and Vinnie Burke	Music Minus Many Men
12160	Bill Barron	The Tenor Stylings of Bill Barron
12161	Barbara Long	Voice of Barbara Long, The
12162	Art Tatum	(never issued)
12163	Bill Barron	Modern Windows
12164	Curtis Fuller	Images of Curtis Fuller
12167	Gabe Baltazar	(never issued)
12169	Sun Ra	The Futuristic Sounds of Sun Ra
12170	Bill Hardman	Saying Something
12171	Art Blakey	Midnight Session
12172	New York Jazz Ensemble	Adams Theme
12173	Mathews, Mat	Four French Horns Plus Rhythm
12174	Teddy Charles	The Vibe-rant Quintet
12175	New York Jazz Quartet	Gone Native
12176	Various Artists	The Giants of Jazz
12177	Pery Robinson	Funk Dumpling
12178	Bill Dixon and Archie Shepp	Archie Shepp – Bill Dixon Quartet
12179	Charlie Parker	Bird Returns
12180	Jack Brokensha	And Then I Said
12181	Jimmy Scott	If You Only Knew
12182	Paul Bley	Footloose!
12183	Bill Barron	Hot Line
12184	Bill Dixon/Archie Shepp	Bill Dixon 7-tette/Archie Shepp and the New York Contemporary 5
12185	Joseph Scianni	New Concepts
12186	Charlie Parker	Newly Discovered Sides
12187	Vinson Hill	Vinson Hill Trio
12188	Valdo Williams	New Advanced Jazz
12189	Robert F. Pozar	Good Golly, Miss Nancy
12190	Marc Levin	The Dragon Suite
12191	Ed Curran	Elysa
12192	Paul Jeffrey	Electrifying Sounds
12193	Marzette Watts	The Marzette Watts Ensemble
12194	Charles Moffett	The Gift
12195	Doug Carn	Doug Carn Trio
12196	Various Artists	Jazz Concert West Coast
12197	Cozy Cole	Concerto for Cozy
12198	Jackie and Roy	Jazz Classics by Charlie Ventura's Band
12199	Pete Johnson	Pete's Blues
12200	Charlie Kennedy and Charlie Ventura	Crazy Rhythms
12201	John Jenkins and Donald Byrd	Jazz Eyes
12202	Charlie Ventura	East of Suez
12203	Don Byas	Free and Easy
12204	Dizzy Gillespie	Dizzy Gillespie, Milt Jackson, Joe Carroll
12205	Various Artists	South Pacific Jazz
12206	Ronnell Bright	Bright's Spot
12207	Ben Pollack and Wingy Manone	Dixieland Strut
12208	Various Artists	We Dig Dixieland Jazz
12209	Curtis Fuller	Jazz ...It's Magic!
12210	Don Bagley	Jazz on the Rocks
12211	Pepper Adams	The Cool Sound of Pepper Adams
12212	Dorothy Ashby	The Jazz Harpist
12213	Various Artists	Dixieland Mainstream
12214	Wild Bill Davison/Bill Stafford	Dixieland
12215	Art Pepper and Sonny Red	Two Altos
12216	Joe Williams	Sings
12217	Various Artists	Singin' and Swingin'
12218	Sonny Terry and Brownie McGhee	Down Home Blues
12219	Mildred Bailey	Mildred Bailey
12220	Various Artists	The Girls Sing
12300	Jimmy Scott	Very Truly Yours
12301	Jimmy Scott	The Fabulous Songs of Jimmy Scott
12302	Jimmy Scott	The Fabulous Voice of Jimmy Scott
12303	Bill Barron	Motivation
12305	Rock Ferrante	Rock 'n Rhythm
13001	A. K. Salim	Blues Suite
13002	Wilbur Harden	Plays the King and I
13003	Bobby Donaldson	Dixieland Jazz Party
13004	Wilbur Harden	Jazz Way Out
13005	Wilbur Harden	Tanganyika Strut
13006	Curtis Fuller	Blues-ette
13007	Yusef Lateef	The Dreamer
13008	Yusef Lateef	The Fabric of Jazz
13009	Frank Wess	Opus de Blues
13010	Curtis Fuller	Jazztet Feat. Benny Golson
13011	Curtis Fuller	Imagination
13012	Bucky Pizzarelli	Midnight Moods
14002	Nappy Brown	Sings
14003	Jimmy Scott	If You Only Knew
14004	Sammy Price	Rock
14005	Big Maybelle	Sings
14009	Various Artists	Angry Tenors
14010	Cozy Cole	Concerto for Cozy
14011	Big Maybelle	Candy
14012	Joe Turner	And the Blues'll Make You Happy, Too!
14016	Joe Turner	Careless Love
14018	Various Artists	House Rent Party
14019	Sonny Terry and Brownie McGhee	Back Country Blues
14025	Nappy Brown	The Right Time
14033	Gene Ammons	Golden Saxophone
14041	Dud Bascomb	(never issued)
14471	Houston Person	The Gospel Soul of Houston Person
16000	Various Artists	Livin' With the Blues
16002	Esther Rolle	The Garden of My Mind
16003	Jimmy Scott	Can't We Begin Again

== Subsidiaries ==
- Acorn Records (1949‒51)
- Gospel Records (1958–early 1970s)
- Regent Records (1947‒64)
- Sharp Records (1960‒64)

== See also ==
- List of record labels
