= Ozzie Cadena =

American record producer

Background information
- Birth name: Oscar Cadena
- Born: September 26, 1924; Oklahoma City, Oklahoma, U.S.
- Died: April 9, 2008 (aged 83); Torrance, California, U.S.
- Genres: Jazz music
- Instrument: Record producer
- Years active: 1950s–70s
- Labels: Savoy Records

Oscar "Ozzie" Cadena (September 26, 1924 – April 9, 2008) was an American record producer with Savoy Records and Prestige Records who recorded gospel and jazz music in the 1950s, 1960s and 1970s, and helped popularize jazz music in Los Angeles.

== Background ==
Cadena was born in Oklahoma City on September 26, 1924, and moved as a child to Newark, New Jersey. As a youth, he would visit African-American churches and travel to Harlem to listen to the music. He enlisted in the United States Marine Corps and served for four years in the South Pacific during World War II.

He worked at Newark's Radio Record Shop, whose owner Herman Lubinsky also owned Savoy Records. Cadena became a producer and A&R scout from 1954 to 1959 after his first sessions, in which he recorded trombonists J. J. Johnson and Kai Winding in the first album of a lengthy collaboration; Cadena had first spoken to Johnson about a duo with Bennie Green which led to a duo after all, but with Winding as his partner. Together with drummer Kenny Clarke, Cadena arranged series of one-time recordings with groups of musicians, recorded at recording engineer Rudy Van Gelder's studio in Hackensack, New Jersey. His recordings at Savoy included work of artists Cannonball Adderley, Shirley Caesar, John Lee Hooker, Milt Jackson, Yusef Lateef, Charles Mingus, Esther Phillips, Jimmy Scott and Marion Williams.

Cadena owned a record store in New Brunswick, New Jersey, and another in Newark that would feature jam sessions, and also established the recording label Choice Records. He went to Prestige Records in October 1962 as head of A&R, replacing Esmond Edwards, who left to take a similar position developing jazz artists at the Argo Records label of Chess Records. At Prestige he was responsible for overseeing the production and release of soul jazz and other records by artists including Red Holloway, Jack McDuff and Shirley Scott.

After relocating to the West Coast, and settling in Hermosa Beach, California, in the mid-1970s, Cadena promoted jazz in the LA area at such clubs as the Lighthouse Café in Hermosa Beach and other influential area clubs.

== Death ==
A resident of Redondo Beach, California, Cadena died at the age of 83 on April 9, 2008, at Little Company of Mary Hospital in Torrance, California, due to pneumonia. He had suffered a stroke in 2007. He was survived by his wife, daughter, two sons, and two grandsons. His son, Dez Cadena, is a singer and guitarist who performed with the hardcore punk band Black Flag and later played guitar with the Misfits. His grandson, Kyle Cadena, is a guitarist who performed with Bernie Worrell, keyboardist for P-Funk and Talking Heads, in the Bernie Worrell Orchestra.
