= More (Clarke-Boland Big Band album) =

Studio album by Kenny Clarke/Francy Boland Big Band
- Released: 1968
- Recorded: July 17, 1968; International Recording Studios, Rome, Italy
- Genre: Jazz
- Length: 35:22
- Label: Campi; SJG 12006
- Producer: Gigi Campi and Giuseppe Giacchi

Kenny Clarke-Francy Boland Big Band chronology
Faces (1968)	More (1968)	Jazz Convention Vol. III (1968)

Jazz in the Movies cover

More (also released as Jazz in the Movies) is an album by the Kenny Clarke/Francy Boland Big Band featuring performances recorded in Italy in 1968 and first released on producer Gigi Campi's own label. The album features big band arrangements of Italian film music.

== Reception ==
Professional ratings
Review scores
Source	Rating
AllMusic	3/5 stars

The AllMusic review says "unless one is a devotee of Italian films, most of this music will be unfamiliar to jazz fans, although the perfunctory arrangements (nearly all under four minutes) don't leave room for a lot of solos... The music is good, but there are higher priority recordings by the Kenny Clarke-Francy Boland Big Band available".

== Track listing ==
1. "Seven Golden Men" (Armando Trovajoli) - 4:03
2. "Je M'en Fous" (Riz Ortolani, Nino Oliviero, Marcello Ciorciolini) - 3:05
3. "Your Smile" (Piero Piccioni) - 2:22
4. "Questi Vent' Anni Miei" (Ennio Morricone, Franco Torti, Guido Castaldo) - 3:06
5. "Passerella di Otto e Mezzo" (Nino Rota) - 2:44
6. "Roma Nun Fa' la Stupida Stasera" (Trovajoli, Pietro Garinei, Sandro Giovannini) - 2:12
7. "More" (Ortolani, Oliviero, Ciorciolini, Norman Newell) - 4:02
8. "Canto d'Amore" (Carlo Rustichelli, Nino Nicotra) - 3:26
9. "Voglio Bene al Mondo" (Oliviero, Torti, Castaldo) - 3:04
10. "La Hora de la Verdad" (Piccioni) - 3:48
11. "Saxology" (Mario Bertolazzi) - 2:48

== Personnel ==
- Kenny Clarke - drums
- Francy Boland - piano, arranger
- Benny Bailey - trumpet, flugelhorn
- Jimmy Deuchar, Shake Keane, Duško Gojković, Idrees Sulieman - trumpet
- Nat Peck, Åke Persson, Eric van Lier - trombone
- Derek Humble - alto saxophone
- Tony Coe, Johnny Griffin, Don Menza, Ronnie Scott, - tenor saxophone
- Sahib Shihab - baritone saxophone, flute
- Jimmy Woode - bass
- Fats Sadi - vibraphone, percussion
- Mario Bertolazzi, Ralph Ferraro - arranger
