= Midnight Mood =

1967 studio album by Mark Murphy

- original artwork by Heinz Bähr

Studio album by Mark Murphy
- Released: 1968
- Recorded: December 18, 1967
- Studios: Lindström Studios, Cologne, Nordrhein-Westfalen, Germany
- Genre: Vocal jazz
- Length: 37:33
- Label: SABA
- Producer: Gigi Campi

Mark Murphy chronology
Who Can I Turn To (1966)	Midnight Mood (1968)	This Must Be Earth (1970)

Midnight Mood is a 1967 studio album by Mark Murphy.

Midnight Mood is the 10th album by American jazz vocalist Mark Murphy. It was recorded when Murphy was 35 years old and released by the SABA/MPS Records label in Germany in 1968. The release is a mix of standards and original songs from members of the Kenny Clarke-Francy Boland Big Band.

== Background ==
Murphy had been living in London for four years by the time he recorded Midnight Mood. Members of the Kenny Clarke-Francy Boland Big Band formed Murphy's backing group for this recording. Murphy had been touring Europe and playing Ronnie Scott's Jazz Club in London with them.

== Recording ==
Professional ratings
Review scores
Source	Rating
The Rolling Stone Jazz Record Guide	4/5 stars
The Virgin Encyclopedia of Popular Music	3/5 stars
AllMusic	4.5/5 stars

Producer Gigi Campi (Pierluigi Campi), an Italian architect, Cologne restauranteur, jazz concert and festival organizer, helped found the Clarke-Boland Big Band in the early 1960s. Campi produced many jazz recordings including "Tough Tenors” by Johnny Griffin & Eddie “Lockjaw” Davis, “All Smiles” by The Kenny Clarke-Francy Boland Big Band, and “November Girl” by Carmen McRae and The Kenny Clarke Francy Boland Big Band, all on MPS. But he also founded MoD Records and worked on other labels.

Campi assembled an eight-man band to accompany Murphy on this recording. Kenny Clarke plays drums and Francy Boland plays piano and did the arrangements. The members of the Kenny Clarke-Francy Boland Big Band providing backup include Ronnie Scott on tenor saxophone, Jimmy Deuchar on trumpet, Sahib Shihab on flute and baritone saxophone, Åke Persson on trombone, Derek Humble on alto saxophone, and former Ellington bassist Jimmy Woode.

Murphy contributes lyrics to Jimmy Deuchar's "Why and How" and Francy Boland's "Hopeless". Years later DJ Gilles Peterson would turn "Why and How", a soul-jazz rare groove, into a dance floor smash in the 1980s and help revive Murphy's career.

Jump for Joy is a Duke Ellington 1941 stage musical and Murphy opens the album singing the title tune a cappela before the band joins in and he follows with scat improvisation. Clarke and Woode's "I Don't Want Nothin' " is an up-tempo bluesy arrangement. The ballad "Alone Together" is from a 1932 Broadway show Flying Colors by Arthur Schwartz and Howard Dietz and is taken at a quick tempo featuring brushwork by Clarke and a muted trumpet solo from Jimmy Deuchar. Åke Persson is featured on trombone on Cy Coleman's "You Fascinate Me So". Several of the remaining ballads feature Boland on piano. "Sconsolato" is a slow Latin groove, Murphy's first of many to follow on subsequent releases.

== Reception ==
The Rolling Stone Jazz Record Guide assigns the album 4 stars (meaning, excellent: a record of substantial merit, though flawed in some essential way). In the review Andy Rowan writes that Midnight Mood boasts "inventive, full-bodied performances that create a feeling of cohesiveness" proving "that when the glitter is stripped away Mark Murphy is a singer of great power, depth and skill".

The Virgin Encyclopedia of Popular Music gives the album 3 stars (meaning, good, by the artist's usual standards and therefore recommended.)

The AllMusic guide assigns 4.5 stars.

Murphy biographer Peter Jones includes Midnight Mood in his list of essential top 10 Mark Murphy albums. In his book This is Hip: The Life of Mark Murphy, Jones says that Midnight Mood is one of the best albums Murphy ever made. He writes, "Murphy is in devastatingly fine voice on these tracks, relaxed and swinging with the kind of material he loved and knew well".

Peter Quinn, writing a review for Jazzwise magazine, gives the album 4 stars. He writes, "Midnight Mood is a must-hear recording, not just for Murphy die-hards but all lovers of vocal jazz...the 10-track album is outstandingly good on all fronts: dynamic control, time-bending phrasing, plus an immense depth of feeling."

Christopher Louden praised the album in his JazzTimes review writing, "Like so many of his vocal contemporaries, Mark Murphy was struggling in the late 1960s, jumping from label to label for scattershot projects that garnered little attention. Best among them is 1968’s Midnight Mood (actually released on SABA, which became MPS), vital connective tissue bridging Murphy’s progress from Sinatra-styled crooner to the most boldly dynamic vocalist of his generation". He praises Murphy's interpretations of “Alone Together”, “My Ship”, “Jump for Joy”, “You Fascinate Me So”, “I Get Along Without You Very Well” and “I Don’t Want Nothin".

== Track listing ==
1. "Jump for Joy" (Duke Ellington, Sid Kuller, Paul Francis Webster) – 4:46
2. "I Don't Want Nothin' " (Kenny Clarke, Jimmy Woode) – 2:53
3. "Why and How" (Jimmy Deuchar, Mark Murphy) – 3:02
4. "Alone Together" (Arthur Schwartz, Howard Dietz) – 3:03
5. "You Fascinate Me So" (Cy Coleman, Carolyn Leigh) – 4:14
6. "Hopeless" (Francy Boland, Murphy) – 4:31
7. "Sconsolato" (Woode) – 3:51
8. "My Ship" (Kurt Weill, Ira Gershwin) – 3:54
9. "Just Give Me Time" (Boland, Woode) – 2:39
10. "I Get Along Without You Very Well" (Hoagy Carmichael, Jane Brown Thompson) – 4:46

== Personnel ==
Performance

- Mark Murphy – vocals
- Jimmy Woode – bass
- Francy Boland – piano, arranger
- Kenny Clarke – drums
- Derek Humble – alto saxophone
- Sahib Shihab – baritone saxophone, flute
- Ronnie Scott – tenor saxophone
- Åke Persson – trombone
- Jimmy Deuchar – trumpet

Production

- Wolfgang Hirschmann – engineer
- Gigi Campi – producer
- Heinz Bähr – original artwork
- Keith Lightbody – liner notes
- Stefan Franzen – reissue liner notes
