= Now Hear Our Meanin' =

Studio album by Kenny Clarke/Francy Boland Big Band
- Released: 1965
- Recorded: January 25–26, 1963; Cologne, West Germany
- Genre: Jazz
- Length: 31:30
- Label: Columbia; CS 9114
- Producer: Gigi Campi

Kenny Clarke-Francy Boland Big Band chronology
Handle with Care (1963)	Now Hear Our Meanin' (1965)	Swing, Waltz, Swing (1966)

Now Hear Our Meanin' is an album by the Kenny Clarke/Francy Boland Big Band featuring performances recorded in Germany in 1963 and released on the Columbia label in 1965.

== Reception ==
Professional ratings
Review scores
Source	Rating
AllMusic	4/5 stars
The Penguin Guide to Jazz Recordings	3/4 stars
Record Mirror	3/5 stars

The AllMusic review stated "Their third studio date is a swinging affair, with potent charts by Boland and a number of strong soloists... The only disappointment with this disc is the excessive use of reverb and occasional shifting of instruments back and forth between both channels".

== Track listing ==
All compositions by Francy Boland, except where indicated.

1. "Johnny One Note" (Richard Rodgers, Lorenz Hart) - 2:25
2. "Night Lady" - 8:12
3. "I'm So Scared of Girls When They're Good Looking" (Jack Sels) - 5:25
4. "A Ball for Othello" - 2:32
5. "Sabbath Message" - 5:27
6. "Now Hear My Meanin'" - 6:29

== Personnel ==
- Kenny Clarke - drums
- Francy Boland - piano, arranger
- Edmund Arnie, Benny Bailey, Jimmy Deuchar, Maffy Falay, Roger Guérin, Idrees Sulieman - trumpet
- Keg Johnson, Erich Kleinschuster, Nat Peck, Åke Persson - trombone
- Derek Humble - alto saxophone
- Carl Drevo, Billy Mitchell, Ronnie Scott - tenor saxophone
- Sahib Shihab - baritone saxophone, flute
- Jimmy Woode - bass
- Joe Harris - timpani
