= Handle with Care (Clarke-Boland Big Band album) =

Studio album by Kenny Clarke/Francy Boland Big Band
- Released: 1963
- Recorded: January 25 & 26, 1963; Cologne, West Germany
- Genre: Jazz
- Length: 34:25
- Label: Atlantic; SD 1404
- Producer: Gigi Campi

Kenny Clarke-Francy Boland Big Band chronology
Jazz Is Universal (1962)	Handle with Care (1963)	Now Hear Our Meanin' (1965)

Handle with Care is an album by the Kenny Clarke/Francy Boland Big Band featuring performances recorded in Germany in 1963 for the Atlantic label.

== Reception ==
Professional ratings
Review scores
Source	Rating
The Penguin Guide to Jazz Recordings	3/4 stars

The AllMusic review by Ken Dryden stated: "Although pretty brief by CD standards at just 34 minutes 26 seconds, there's absolutely no filler in this highly recommended CD".

== Track listing ==
All compositions by Francy Boland, except where indicated.

1. "Long Note Blues (Here Is Cecco Beppe)" - 6:38
2. "Get Out of Town" (Cole Porter) - 5:50
3. "Sonor" (Kenny Clarke) - 3:11
4. "Speedy Reeds" - 5:39
5. "Old Stuff" - 4:37
6. "Om Mani Padme Hum" - 8:30

== Personnel ==
- Kenny Clarke - drums
- Francy Boland - piano, arranger
- Edmund Arnie, Benny Bailey, Jimmy Deuchar, Maffy Falay, Roger Guérin, Idrees Sulieman - trumpet
- Keg Johnson, Erich Kleinschuster, Nat Peck, Åke Persson - trombone
- Derek Humble - alto saxophone
- Carl Drevo, Billy Mitchell, Ronnie Scott - tenor saxophone
- Sahib Shihab - baritone saxophone, flute
- Jimmy Woode - bass
- Joe Harris - timpani
- Fats Sadi - bongos
