= The Golden 8 =

Studio album by Kenny Clarke, Francy Boland
- Released: 1961
- Recorded: May 18 & 19, 1961
- Venue: Café Campi
- Genre: Jazz
- Length: 48:25
- Label: Blue Note
- Producer: Pierluigi "Gigi" Campi

Kenny Clarke chronology
Plays Andre Hodeir (1957)	The Golden 8 (1961)	Jazz Is Universal (1961)

The Golden 8 is an album by American jazz drummer Kenny Clarke and Belgian jazz composer and pianist Francy Boland recorded live in Gigi Campi's 'gelateria' in Cologne in 1961 and released on the Blue Note label. The album established the relationship which led to the formation of the Kenny Clarke/Francy Boland Big Band.

== Reception ==
The AllMusic review awarded the album 3 stars.

Professional ratings
Review scores
Source	Rating
AllMusic	3/5 stars

== Track listing ==
All compositions by Francy Boland, except as indicated

1. "La Campimania"
2. "Gloria" (aka "Gloria's Theme from BUtterfield 8") (Bronislau Kaper, Mack David)
3. "High Notes"
4. "Softly, as in a Morning Sunrise" (Oscar Hammerstein II, Sigmund Romberg)
5. "The Golden Eight"
6. "Strange Meeting"
7. "You'd Be So Nice to Come Home To" (Cole Porter)
8. "Dorian 0437"
9. "Poor Butterfly" (John Golden, Raymond Hubbell)
10. "Basse Cuite"

== Personnel ==
- Kenny Clarke - drums
- Francy Boland - piano
- Dusko Gojkovic - trumpet
- Raymond Droz - alto horn
- Derek Humble - alto saxophone
- Karl Drevo - tenor saxophone
- Chris Kellens - euphonium
- Jimmy Woode - bass
- Wolfgang Hirschmann - engineer
- Rudy Van Gelder - mastering
