= 17 Men and Their Music =

Live album by Kenny Clarke/Francy Boland Big Band
- Released: 1968
- Recorded: November and December 1967; Cologne, West Germany
- Genre: Jazz
- Label: Campi; SJG 12004
- Producer: Gigi Campi

Kenny Clarke-Francy Boland Big Band chronology
Open Door (1967)	17 Men and Their Music (1968)	All Smiles (1968)

17 Men and Their Music is a live album by the Kenny Clarke/Francy Boland Big Band featuring performances recorded in West Germany in 1967 and first released on producer Gigi Campi's own label. The album's title phrase was added as a subtitle / "sticker" to re-issues of four Clarke-Boland Big Band albums: Faces: Gigi Campi Presents 17 Men and Their Music 1; All Smiles: Gigi Campi Presents 17 Men and Their Music 2; Latin Kaleidoscope: Gigi Campi Presents 17 Men and Their Music 3; Fellini 712: Gigi Campi Presents 17 Men and Their Music 4

== Track listing ==
All compositions by Francy Boland except where noted.

1. "Resurrection" (Kenny Clarke)
2. "Woody Nightshade"
3. "New Eye"
4. "Mauve"
5. "The 18th Man" (Clarke)
6. "Klook's Report" (Clarke)
7. "Personeske"
8. "Hopeless"
9. "Shihab, Humble & Co."
10. "You Dig It"
11. "The Griffin"
12. "Kenny and Kenny"

== Personnel ==
- Kenny Clarke - drums
- Francy Boland - piano, arranger
- Benny Bailey, Jimmy Deuchar, Shake Keane, Idrees Sulieman - trumpet
- Nat Peck, Åke Persson, Eric van Lier - trombone
- Derek Humble - alto saxophone
- Johnny Griffin, Don Menza, Ronnie Scott, - tenor saxophone
- Sahib Shihab - baritone saxophone, flute
- Jimmy Woode - bass
- Fats Sadi - percussion
