= Muvaffak "Maffy" Falay =

Turkish trumpeter (1930–2022)

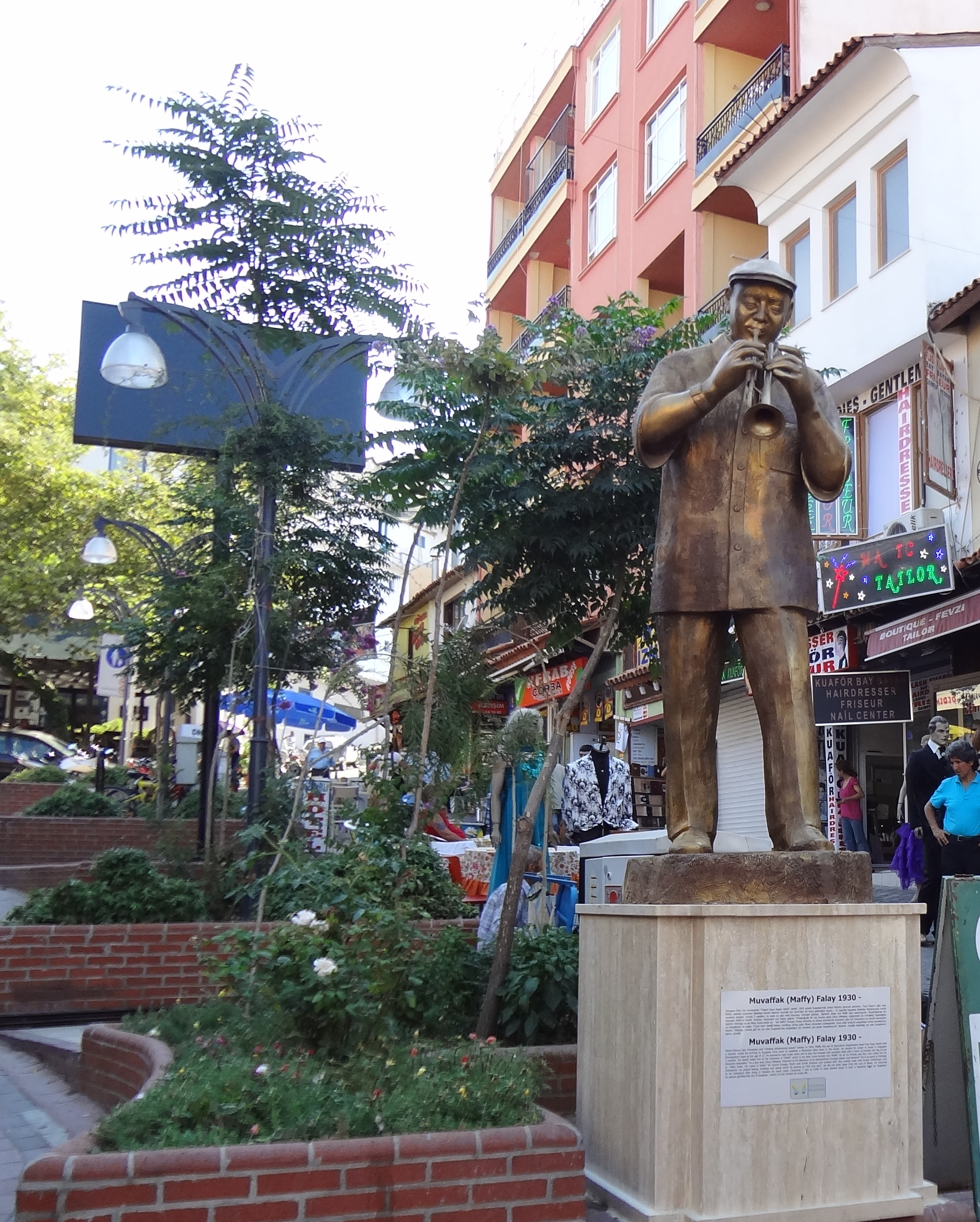
Statue of Falay in his hometown of Kuşadası

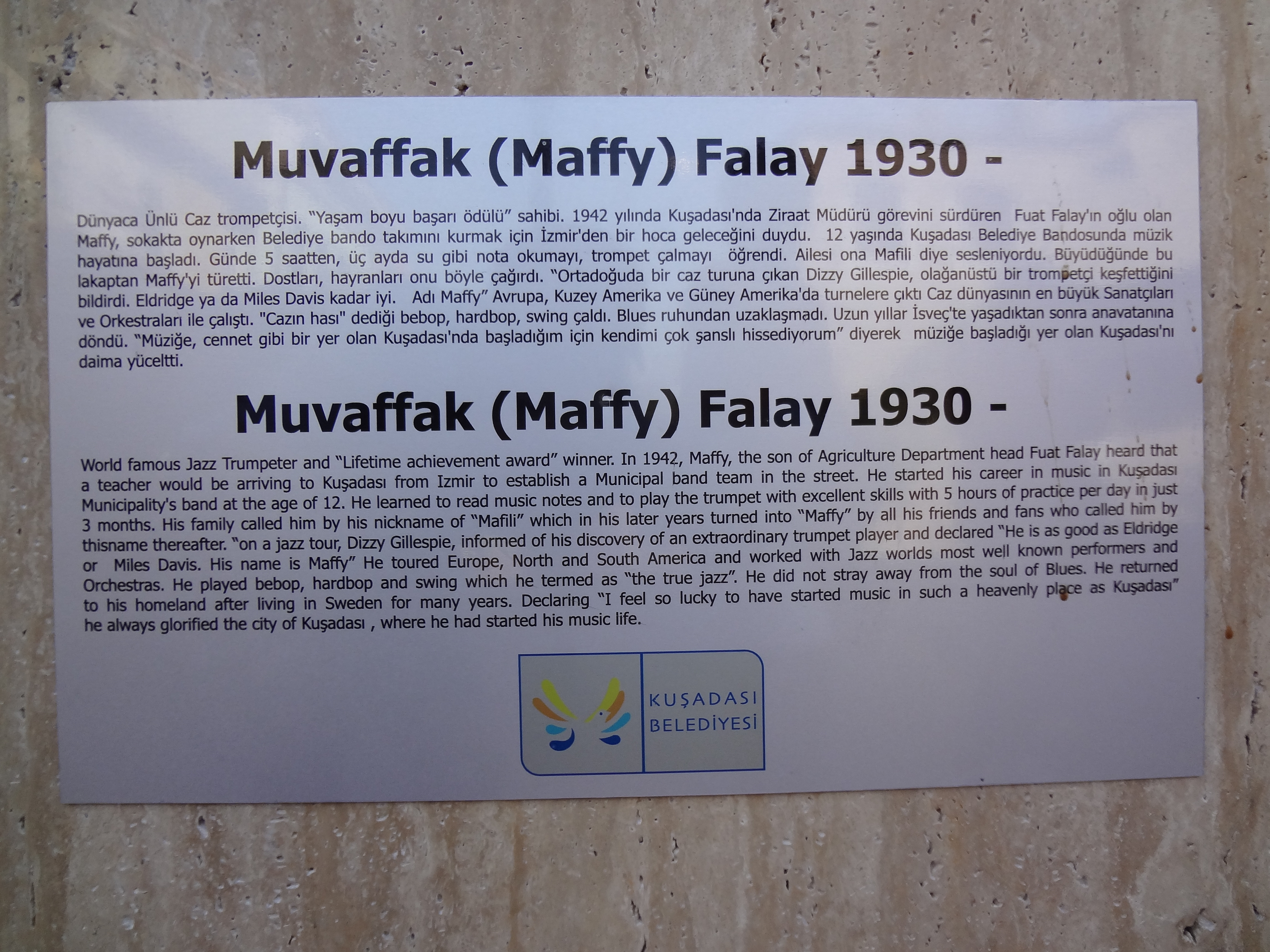
Descriptive plaque at Falay statue

Muvaffak "Maffy" Falay (30 August 1930 – 22 February 2022) was a Turkish jazz trumpeter.

== Biography ==
Falay was born in Karşıyaka; his family later moved to Kuşadası, a large resort town on Turkey's Aegean coast. A statue in the Kuşadası town square now honors him, with the plaque reading in part:

"In 1942, Maffy, the son of Agriculture Department head Fuat Falay heard that a teacher would be arriving in Kuşadası from Izmir to establish a Municipal band team in the street. He started his career in music in Kuşadası Municipality’s band at the age of 12. He learned to read music notes and to play the trumpet with excellent skills with 5 hours of practice per day in just 3 months."

He studied trumpet and piano in Ankara Conservatory. In 1960, he joined the radio orchestra of Kurt Edelhagen in Cologne. Then he toured Europe as a member of the Kenny Clarke/Francy Boland Big Band and played on six of the band's albums.

He has played in orchestras led by Benny Bailey, Åke Persson, Phil Woods, Sixten Eriksson and Quincy Jones. In 1965, he decided to move to Sweden where he was playing for the radio jazz orchestra, and touring around the Americas at the same time. In 1970, he started playing in the Dizzy Gillespie Reunion Orchestra. Gillespie is said to have described him as "as good as Roy Eldridge or Miles Davis." He has also played with Dexter Gordon, Stan Getz, and Elvin Jones.

In 1971, he formed the band Sevda, featuring Bernt Rosengren, Okay Temiz, Gunnar Bergsten, Ove Gustafsson and Salih Baysal.

In 2005, he received the Lifetime Achievement Award at the Istanbul Jazz Festival. Falay died on 22 February 2022, at the age of 91.

== Recordings ==
=== As leader/co-leader ===
- 1972: Sevda (Caprice)
- 1972: Live at Jazzhus Montmartre (Caprice 1972)
- 1973: Live at Fregatten (Sonet)
- 1986: We Six (Phontastic)

=== As sideman ===
With Don Cherry

- The Creator Has a Master Plan (Caprice, 1971)
- Live in Stockholm (Caprice, 2013)

With the Kenny Clarke/Francy Boland Big Band

- Jazz Is Universal (Atlantic, 1962)
- Handle with Care (Atlantic, 1963)
- Now Hear Our Meanin' (Columbia, 1963 [1965])
