= Latin Kaleidoscope =

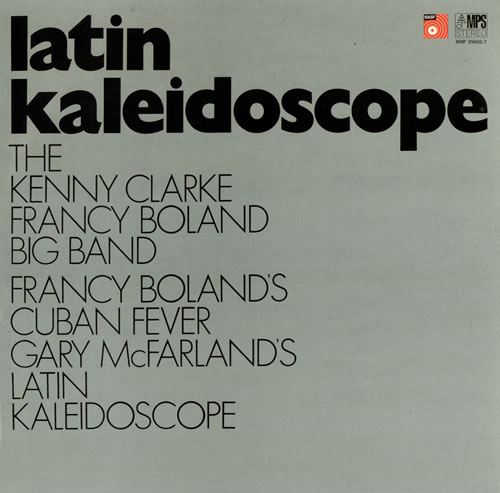

Studio album by Kenny Clarke/Francy Boland Big Band
- Released: 1968
- Recorded: August 28 & 29, 1968
- Studio: Lindström Studios, Cologne, Germany
- Genre: Jazz
- Label: MPS; MPS 15 213
- Producer: Gigi Campi

Kenny Clarke-Francy Boland Big Band chronology
| More (1968) | Latin Kaleidoscope (1968) | Fellini 712 (1969) |

Prestige Records cover

Latin Kaleidoscope is an album by the Kenny Clarke/Francy Boland Big Band featuring performances recorded in Germany in 1968 and released on the MPS label in Europe and also released in the US on Prestige Records.

== Reception ==
Professional ratings
Review scores
| Source | Rating |
|---|---|
| AllMusic | 3/5 stars |

AllMusic awarded the album 3 stars. On All About Jazz, Douglas Payne said "Latin Kaleidoscope is comprised of two suites that are more traditionally Latinate, with the band swinging on well-written parts to a panoply of well-used percussion elements".

== Track listing ==
All compositions by Francy Boland, except where indicated.

1. "Un Graso de Areia" (Gary McFarland) - 4:57
2. "Duas Rosas" (McFarland) - 2:20
3. "A Rosa Negra" (McFarland) - 1:57
4. "Uma Fita de Tres Cores" - 4:47
5. "Olhos Negros" (McFarland) - 4:00
6. "Ramo de Flores" (McFarland) - 2:00
7. "Fiebre Cuban" - 2:25
8. "Mambo de las Brujas" - 4:09
9. "Strano Sueno" - 4:00
10. "Cara Bruja" - 2:06
11. "Crespusculo y Aurora" - 6:47

== Personnel ==
- Kenny Clarke - drums
- Francy Boland - piano, arranger
- Benny Bailey, Jimmy Deuchar, Duško Gojković, Milo Pavlovic, Idrees Sulieman - trumpet
- Nat Peck, Åke Persson, Eric van Lier - trombone
- Derek Humble, Phil Woods - alto saxophone
- Johnny Griffin, Ronnie Scott, Tony Coe - tenor saxophone
- Sahib Shihab - baritone saxophone, flute
- Jean Warland, Jimmy Woode - bass
- Kenny Clare - drums
- Shake Keane, Albert Heath, Tony Inzalaco, Sabu Martinez - percussion
