= Swing, Waltz, Swing =

Studio album by Carl Drevo and the Clarke-Boland Big Band
- Released: 1966
- Recorded: February 28, 1966; EMI Studios, Cologne, West Germany
- Genre: Jazz
- Labels: Philips; 840 246 PY
- Producer: Gigi Campi

Kenny Clarke-Francy Boland Big Band chronology
Now Hear Our Meanin' (1965)	Swing, Waltz, Swing (1966)	Sax No End (1967)

Swing, Waltz, Swing is an album by Carl Drevo and the Kenny Clarke/Francy Boland Big Band featuring performances recorded in Germany in 1966 for the German Philips label. The album features big band interpretations of classical waltzes interspersed with jazz standards and original compositions.

== Track listing ==
1. "Frühlingsstimmen" Opus 410 (Johann Strauss) - 3:00
2. "My Favourite Things" (Richard Rodgers, Lorenz Hart) - 3:17
3. "Schön ist die Welt" (Franz Lehár) - 2:38
4. "Wives and Lovers" (Burt Bacharach, Hal David) - 2:26
5. "Rosenkavalier" Opus 59 (Richard Strauss) - 3:12
6. "Claudia" (Karl Drewo) - 2:28
7. "By Strauss" (George Gershwin) - 3:49
8. "Kaiserwalzer" (Johann Strauss) - 3:25
9. "Just Give Me Time" (Francy Boland) - 3:14
10. "Keep On Keeping On" (Jimmy Woode) - 2:48

== Personnel ==
- Kenny Clarke - drums
- Francy Boland - piano, arranger
- Benny Bailey, Jimmy Deuchar, Dusko Gojkovic, Shake Keane - trumpet
- Nat Peck, Åke Persson - trombone
- Derek Humble - alto saxophone
- Carl Drevo, Sal Nistico - tenor saxophone
- Sahib Shihab - baritone saxophone, flute
- Jimmy Woode - bass
- Fats Sadi - percussion
- Bora Roković - arranger
