= Roger Guérin =

French jazz trumpeter and singer

Roger Guérin (French pronunciation: [ʁɔʒe ɡeʁɛ̃]; 9 January 1926, Saarbrücken – 6 February 2010, Nîmes) was a French jazz trumpeter and singer.

Initially a violinist, Guérin studied trumpet and cornet at the Paris Conservatory and won a first prize there as a teenager.

He began working professionally in 1947, playing with Aimé Barelli, Django Reinhardt, Don Byas, Hubert Fol, James Moody, Benny Golson, Bernard Peiffer, Fats Sadi, Lucky Thompson, Kenny Clarke, Blossom Dearie, Martial Solal, Michel Legrand and André Hodeir.

Guérin played at the 1958 Newport Jazz Festival with a youth ensemble, and played in Les Double Six in 1959, later returning to this group. He replaced Clark Terry in Quincy Jones's Big Band in 1960. He worked on the soundtrack to the film Paris Blues in 1961 with Duke Ellington. He worked extensively as a vocalist for Michel Legrand.

Guérin has over 150 album credits to his name. He won the Prix Django Reinhardt in 1959.

== Discography ==
=== As sideman ===
With the Kenny Clarke/Francy Boland Big Band

- Jazz Is Universal (Atlantic, 1962)
- Handle with Care (Atlantic, 1963)
- Now Hear Our Meanin' (Columbia, 1966)

With Andre Hodeir

- The Paris Scene (Savoy, 1957)
- Anna Livia Plurabelle (Philips, 1966)
- Bitter Ending (Epic, 1972)

With Jimmy Raney

- Jimmy Raney Visits Paris (Dawn, 1958)
- Guitaristic (Swing, 1974)
- The Complete Paris Sessions (Vogue, 1984)

With others

- Mickey Baker, Mickey Baker Plays Mickey Baker (Versailles, 1962)
- Pierre Barouh, Pierre Barouh (Disc'Az 1966)
- Claude Bolling, French Jazz (Bally, 1956)
- Claude Bolling, Les Succes de La Nouvelle Orleans (Club Francais, 1958)
- Kenny Clarke, Plays Andre Hodeir (Philips, 1956)
- Michel De Villers, Line for Lions (RDC, 1993)
- Jack Dieval, Jack Dieval & Paris Jazz Quartet (Concert Hall, 1968)
- Benny Golson, Benny Golson and the Philadelphians (United Artists, 1959)
- Michel Hausser, Up in Hamburg (Columbia, 1960)
- Bobby Jaspar, Revisited (Inner City, 1980)
- Quincy Jones, Lausanne 1960 (TCB, 1994)
- Eddy Louiss, Flomela (Dreyfus, 1996)
- Pierre Michelot, Round About a Bass (Mercury, 1963)
- Claude Nougaro, Claude Nougaro (Philips, 1966)
- Django Reinhardt, Django Reinhardt et Son Quintette (Decca, 1966)
- Martial Solal, Martial Solal Big Band (Gaumont, 1981)
- Lucky Thompson, Lucky Sessions (Vogue, 1992)
