= More Smiles =

Studio album by Kenny Clarke/Francy Boland Big Band
- Released: 1969
- Recorded: May 28, 1969
- Studio: Lindström Studios, Cologne, Germany
- Genre: Jazz
- Length: 34:35
- Label: MPS; MPS 15 287
- Producer: Gigi Campi

Kenny Clarke-Francy Boland Big Band chronology
All Blues (1969)	More Smiles (1969)	At Her Magesty's Pleasure... (1969)

More Smiles is an album by the Kenny Clarke/Francy Boland Big Band featuring performances recorded in Germany in 1969 and released on the MPS label.

== Reception ==
Professional ratings
Review scores
Source	Rating
AllMusic	3/5 stars
The Penguin Guide to Jazz Recordings	3/4 stars

AllMusic awarded the album 3 stars.

== Track listing ==
1. "Johnny One Note" (Richard Rodgers, Lorenz Hart) - 2:38
2. "Lullaby of the Leaves" (Bernice Petkere) - 4:14
3. "Bei Dir War Es Immer So Schön" (Theo Mackeben) - 4:19
4. "My Favorite Things" (Richard Rodgers, Oscar Hammerstein II) - 4:52
5. "Just in Time" (Jule Styne, Betty Comden, Adolph Green) - 4:24
6. "All Through the Night" (Cole Porter) - 3:01
7. "November Girl" (Francy Boland) - 5:51
8. "My Heart Belongs to Daddy" (Cole Porter) - 2:39
9. "Love for Sale" (Cole Porter) - 2:37

== Personnel ==
- Kenny Clarke - drums
- Francy Boland - piano, arranger
- Benny Bailey, Tony Fisher, Duško Gojković, Idrees Sulieman - trumpet
- Nat Peck, Åke Persson, Eric van Lier - trombone
- Derek Humble - alto saxophone
- Johnny Griffin, Ronnie Scott, Tony Coe - tenor saxophone
- Sahib Shihab - baritone saxophone
- Jimmy Woode - bass
