= Kenny Clare =

British jazz drummer (1929–1985)

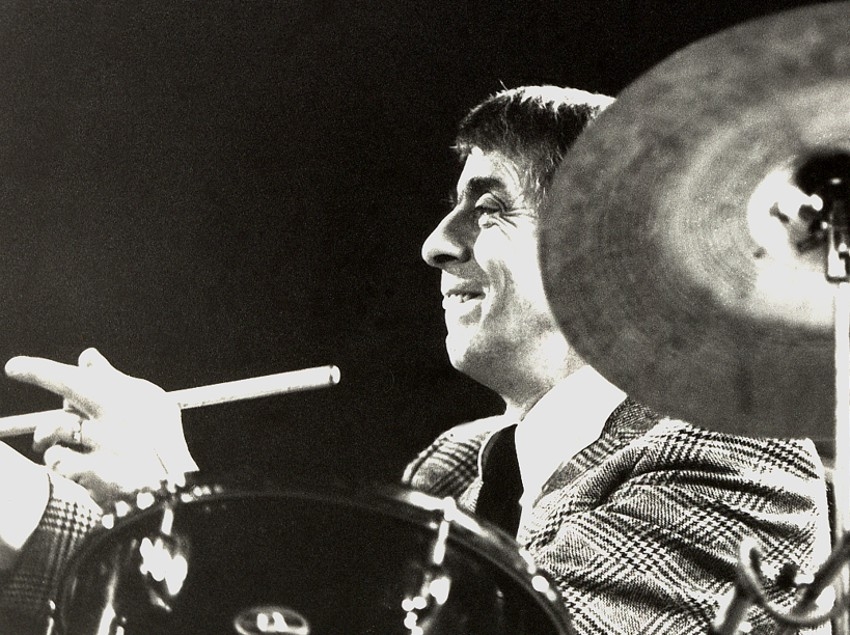

Background information
- Born: Kenneth Cloudsley Clare; 8 June 1929; Leytonstone, London, England
- Died: 11 January 1985 (aged 55) London
- Genre: Jazz
- Occupation: Musician
- Instrument: Drums
- Years active: 1947–1985

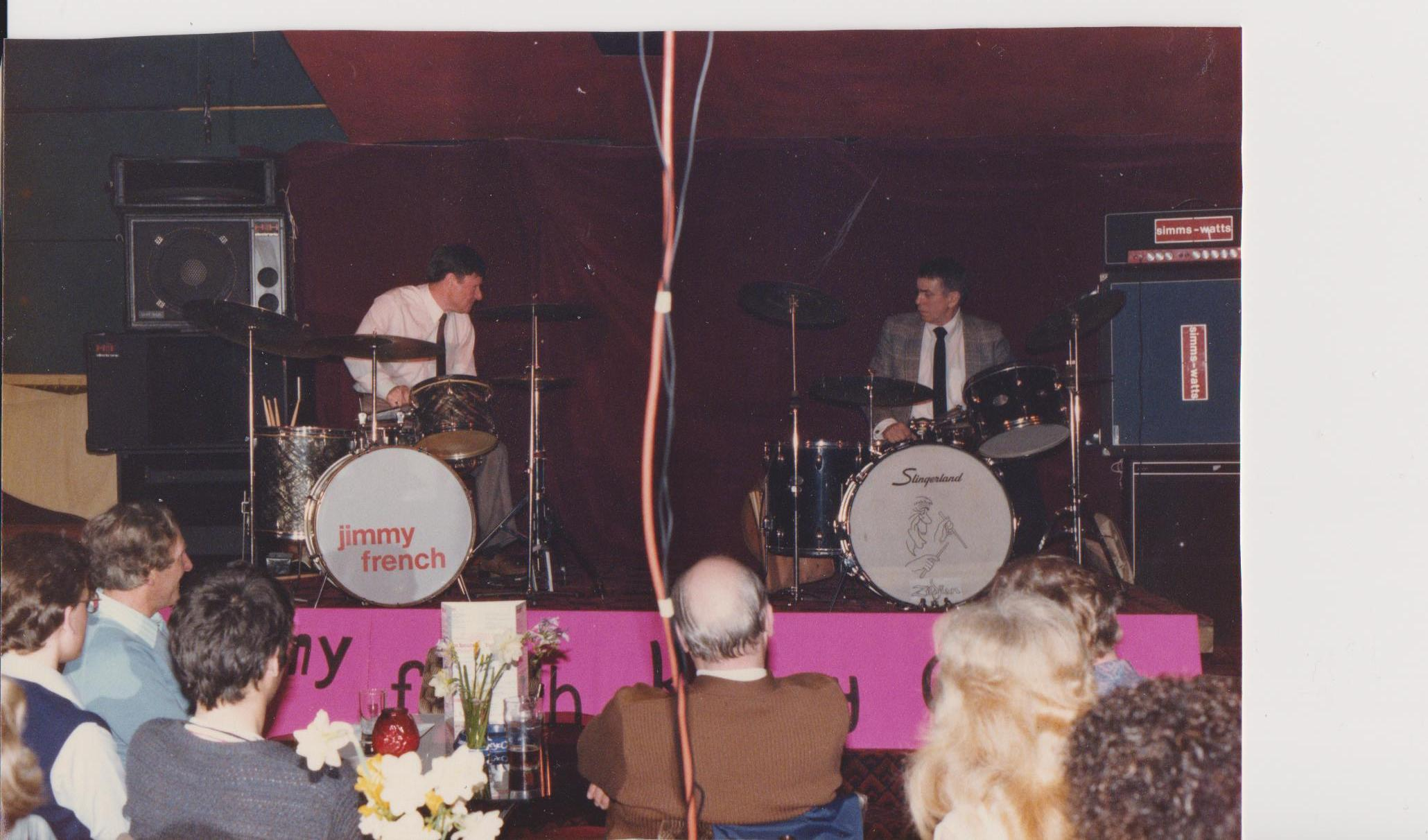
Jazz drummer Jimmy French (left) with Kenny Clare (right), (Penmare Hotel, Hayle, Cornwall, England, 16 April 1984)

Kenneth Cloudsley Clare (8 June 1929 – 11 January 1985) was a British jazz drummer. (Note: He should not be confused with Kenny Clarke (also a jazz drummer), in whose band he played.)

== Early life ==
Born in Leytonstone, Essex, England, Clare learnt to play the drums at the age of 13.

== Career ==
In 1947, Clare joined the Royal Air Force and played with various service bands. He played with Oscar Rabin on UK radio in his early 20s. Following this, he played with Jack Parnell and then with the Johnny Dankworth Orchestra in 1955 and remained with this orchestra for five years until September 1960. He also worked with the Dudley Moore Trio. In the 1960s, he played with Ted Heath and Ronnie Stephenson, and played in the studios as a member of Sounds Orchestral.

He stood in for Kenny Clarke from 1963 until 1966 in the Kenny Clarke-Francy Boland Big Band when Clarke was unavailable. However, from 1967 to 1971 (when the band folded), Clare was a regular paired with Clarke in what became a two-drummer band for performances, concerts, and at least 15 recordings issued by several labels. Clare also accompanied singers including Ella Fitzgerald, Tony Bennett, and Cleo Laine. On 5 December 1971, he appeared in concert at Queen Elizabeth Hall with fellow drummers Buddy Rich and Louie Bellson. Clare continued to work in the 1980s, predominantly with Dankworth and singer Cleo Laine. Clare visited Hayle in Cornwall on 16 April 1984 and performed a 'drumming duel' with former professional and local drummer Jimmy French (in the photo shown) at the Penmare Hotel.

Clare worked extensively for radio, television, film, and commercials. He served as secretary to the International Drummers Association.

== Personal life and death ==
Clare was admitted to Westminster Hospital, London in November 1984 and had several operations for the removal of cancer from the esophagus. He died on 11 January 1985, aged 55. The singer Tony Bennett held a benefit concert after his death as a tribute to Clare, who was a fan of Bennett.

Clare was survived by his wife, a freelance London-based session singer, Marjorie Daw, whom he married in 1952. They had both been members of the Oscar Rabin Band in the early 1950s; she also sang with the Don Smith Orchestra, her stage name was See Saw Majorie Daw taken from the nursery rhyme. In 1958 she recorded a solo EP (extended play record) on Columbia Records called "Personally".

His adopted twin daughters, Susan and Lesley, both died from breast cancer. Clare's enthusiasm never drained, always devoting time to other drummers and discussing techniques and the instrument. Even while in the hospital for two months, he kept his practice pads and drumsticks next to his bed.

Marjorie died in 2023 aged 96.

== Legacy ==
In November 2015, just over 30 years after his death, he was honoured with the installation of a blue plaque on his former east London home in Richmond Road, Leytonstone, London.

== Discography ==
With the Kenny Clarke/Francy Boland Big Band

- 17 Men and Their Music (Campi, 1967)
- All Smiles (MPS, 1968)
- Latin Kaleidoscope (MPS, 1968)
- Fellini 712 (MPS, 1969)
- Volcano (Polydor, 1969)
- Rue Chaptal (Polydor, 1969)
- All Blues (MPS, 1969)
- Clarke Boland Big Band en Concert avec Europe 1 (Tréma, 1969 [1992])
- Off Limits (Polydor, 1970)
- November Girl (Black Lion, 1970 [1975]) - with Carmen McRae
- Change of Scenes (Verve, 1971) - with Stan Getz
