= Tony Inzalaco =

American jazz drummer (born 1938)

Anthony Frank "Tony" Inzalaco, Jr. (born January 14, 1938) is an American jazz drummer.

Inzalaco was born in Passaic, New Jersey. He obtained bachelor's and master's degrees from the Manhattan School of Music, and was active in the United States from 1959 to 1968, performing and/or recording with Vinnie Burke, Jaki Byard, Donald Byrd, Chris Connor, Maynard Ferguson, Jim Hall, Roger Kellaway, Morgana King, Lee Konitz, Morris Nanton, Duke Pearson, Benny Powell, Buddy Rich, Charlie Shavers, Johnny Smith, Billy Taylor, and Ben Webster.

== Career ==
In 1968 he moved to Germany, where he lived until 1978 as member of the bands of Kurt Edelhagen and Eugen Cicero. While in Germany he worked with Benny Bailey, Don Byas, Kenny Clarke and Francy Boland, Kenny Drew, Art Farmer, Dizzy Gillespie, Dexter Gordon, Johnny Griffin, Peter Herbolzheimer, Carmen McRae, Sal Nistico, Horace Parlan, Fritz Pauer, Oscar Peterson, Idrees Sulieman, Ben Webster again, Jiggs Whigham, Jimmy Woode, and Leo Wright.

After moving back to the US, he was active principally in Boston in the 1980s, working with Byrd, Griffin, and Farmer again, as well as with Ruby Braff, Al Cohn, and Dakota Staton. He relocated again to Los Angeles in the 1990s, where he led his own ensemble.

== Discography ==
- Roger Kellaway Trio: A Jazz Portrait of Roger Kellaway, Fresh Sound, FSR-147, 1963, CD
- Maynard Ferguson Orchester: The New Sounds, Fresh Sound, FSCD-2010, 1964, CD
- Kenny Clarke/Francy Boland Big Band: Latin Kaleidoscope, MPS, 15 213, 1968, LP
- Paul Nero: El Condor Pasa – Paul Nero in South-America, Liberty, 1970, LP
- Peter Herbolzheimer: My Kind of Sunshine MPS 2121331-5, 1971, LP
- Benny Bailey: Mirrors, Freedom 26316, 1971, LP
- Stan Getz/Francy Boland: Change of Scenes, Verve/Ex Libris 171 084, 1971, LP
- Ira Kris Group: Jazzanova, MPS 21 20907-5, 1971, LP
- Mangelsdorff-Whigham-Persson-Hampton: Trombone Workshop, MPS 2120915-6, 1971, LP
- Bora Roković: Ultra Native MPS 1972
- Maynard Ferguson: Dues, Mainstream, MSM 474418 2, 1972, CD
- Ben Webster: In Hannover, Impro-Jazz, IJ 506v (DVD; auch Gambit Records – 69316 als CD), 1973, (mit Oscar Peterson, Niels-Henning Ørsted Pedersen)
- Peter Herbolzheimer: Rhythm Combination & Brass, MPS, 0088.048, 1970 – 1974, LP
- Art Farmer: A Sleeping Bee Sonet Records, SNTCD 715, 1974, CD
- Francy Boland: Papillon Noir, Freedom 40176, 1975, LP
- Dexter Gordon: Stable Mable, SteepleChase SCCD-31040, 1975, CD
- Eugen Cicero: For My Friends, Intercord 130.010, 1977, LP
- Fritz Pauer Trio: Blues Inside Out, MPS 0068218, 1978, LP
- Dexter Gordon: At the Subway Club 1973, Elemental, 2019

== Sources ==
- "Tony Inzalaco". The New Grove Dictionary of Jazz. 2nd edition, ed. Barry Kernfeld.
