= Faces (Clarke-Boland Big Band album) =

Studio album by Kenny Clarke/Francy Boland Big Band
- Released: 1969
- Recorded: June 28 & 29, 1968
- Studios: Sonopress Studios, Cologne, Germany
- Genre: Jazz
- Labels: MPS; MPS 15 218
- Producer: Gigi Campi

Kenny Clarke-Francy Boland Big Band chronology
All Smiles (1968)	Faces (1969)	More (1968)

Faces (subtitled 17 Men and Their Music) is an album by the Kenny Clarke/Francy Boland Big Band featuring performances recorded in Germany in 1968 and released on the MPS label.

== Reception ==
Professional ratings
Review scores
Source	Rating
AllMusic	3/5 stars

AllMusic awarded the album 3 stars.

== Track listing ==
All compositions by Francy Boland.

1. "1st Movement: Vortographs" - 10:31
2. "2nd Movement: Solarisation" - 8:12
3. "3rd Movement: Panchromatic" - 3:40
4. "4th Movement: Macrographic" - 12:37

== Personnel ==
- Kenny Clarke - drums
- Francy Boland - piano, arranger
- Benny Bailey, Jimmy Deuchar, Duško Gojković, Idrees Sulieman - trumpet
- Nat Peck, Åke Persson, Eric van Lier - trombone
- Derek Humble - alto saxophone
- Johnny Griffin, Ronnie Scott, Tony Coe - tenor saxophone
- Sahib Shihab - baritone saxophone, flute
- Jimmy Woode - bass
- Kenny Clare - drums
- Fats Sadi - vibraphone, percussion
