= Rick Kiefer =

American trumpet player (born 1939)

Rick Kiefer (born 1939 died 2 March 2025) was an American trumpet player who has spent most of his career as a professional musician in Germany. Born and raised in Cleveland, Ohio, he first attracted notice in the early 1960s as a member of the Maynard Ferguson big band. In the mid-60s, he moved to Germany and became a member of the Max Greger band, and by the end of the decade, he had joined the Kurt Edelhagen orchestra in Cologne. He spent the first half of the 1970s as a member of the James Last Orchestra, as well as with the Peter Herbolzheimer band, and from the late 70s onwards became a permanent member of the WDR (Westdeutscher Rundfunk, or West German Radio) big band. Kiefer is notable for being part of a group of Cleveland natives who played trumpet for James Last, the others being Bob Lanese, Chuck Findley and Bob Findley.

== Discography ==
With Maynard Ferguson

- Newport Suite (Roulette, 1960)
- Let's Face the Music and Dance (Roulette, 1960)
- Maynard '61 (Roulette, 1961)

With the Kenny Clarke/Francy Boland Big Band

- Off Limits (Polydor, 1970)
- Change of Scenes (Verve, 1971) with Stan Getz

As a soloist Rick Kiefer

- Lush Life (Omega, 1975) with Rob Pronk and Jerry van Rooyen
