= Sax No End =

Studio album by Kenny Clarke/Francy Boland Big Band
- Released: 1967
- Recorded: June 18, 1967
- Studio: Rhenus Studios, Cologne, West Germany
- Genre: Jazz
- Length: 35:16
- Label: SABA; SB 15 138
- Producer: Gigi Campi

Kenny Clarke-Francy Boland Big Band chronology
Swing, Waltz, Swing (1966)	Sax No End (1967)	Out of the Folk Bag (1967)

Fire, Heat, Soul & Guts! cover

Sax No End is an album by the Kenny Clarke/Francy Boland Big Band with guest soloist Eddie "Lockjaw" Davis featuring performances recorded in Germany in 1967 and released on the SABA label. The album was also released in the US on Prestige Records as Fire, Heat, Soul & Guts!.

== Reception ==
Professional ratings
Review scores
Source	Rating
AllMusic	4.5/5 stars

The AllMusic review called it "a powerfully swinging session, a mixture of the wallop of Count Basie and the modernism of Gil Evans and Bob Brookmeyer".

== Track listing ==
All compositions by Francy Boland, except where indicated.

1. "New Box" - 6:08
2. "Sax No End" - 5:05
3. "Griff's Groove" - 5:05
4. "Lockjaw Blues" - 3:02
5. "The Turk" - 2:20
6. "Milkshake" (Kenny Clarke) - 5:02
7. "Peter's Waltz" (Sahib Shihab) - 5:01
8. "Griff'n Jaw" - 3:33

== Personnel ==
- Kenny Clarke - drums
- Francy Boland - piano, arranger
- Benny Bailey, Jimmy Deuchar, Idrees Sulieman - trumpet
- Shake Keane - trumpet, flugelhorn
- Nat Peck, Åke Persson, Eric van Lier - trombone
- Derek Humble - alto saxophone
- Eddie "Lockjaw" Davis, Carl Drevo, Johnny Griffin, Ronnie Scott - tenor saxophone
- Sahib Shihab - baritone saxophone
- Jimmy Woode - bass
- Fats Sadi - bongos
