= Off Limits (album) =

Studio album by Kenny Clarke/Francy Boland Big Band
- Released: 1971
- Recorded: September 30, 1970
- Studio: Cornet Studios, Cologne, West Germany
- Genre: Jazz
- Length: 43:38
- Label: Polydor; 2310 147
- Producer: Gigi Campi

Kenny Clarke/Francy Boland Big Band chronology
Clarke Boland Big Band en Concert avec Europe 1 (1969)	Off Limits (1971)	November Girl (1970)

Off Limits is an album by the Kenny Clarke/Francy Boland Big Band which was released on the Polydor label in 1971.

Professional ratings
Review scores
Source	Rating
AllMusic	3/5 stars

== Track listing ==
All compositions by Francy Boland, except where indicated.

1. "Wintersong" (John Surman, Indian Brandee) – 6:04
2. "Astrorama" (Jean-Luc Ponty) – 5:36
3. "Osaka Calling" (Albert Mangelsdorff) – 4:13
4. "Our Kind of Sabi" (Eddy Louiss) – 3:55
5. "Sakara" – 9:33
6. "Exorcisme" – 6:26
7. "Endosmose" – 7:51

== Personnel ==
- Francy Boland – piano, arranger
- Kenny Clarke – drums
- Benny Bailey, Art Farmer, Duško Gojković, Rick Kiefer – trumpet, flugelhorn
- Nat Peck, Åke Persson, Erik van Lier – trombone
- Derek Humble – alto saxophone
- Billy Mitchell, Ronnie Scott – tenor saxophone
- Tony Coe – tenor saxophone, clarinet
- Sahib Shihab – baritone saxophone, flute, soprano saxophone
- Jimmy Woode – bass
- Kenny Clare – drums
