= Change of Scenes =

Studio album by Stan Getz, Francy Boland and the Kenny Clarke/Francy Boland Big Band
- Released: 1971
- Recorded: June 14, 1971; Cologne, West Germany
- Genre: Jazz
- Length: 39:07
- Label: Verve; 2304 034
- Producer: Gigi Campi

Stan Getz chronology
Dynasty (1971)	Change of Scenes (1971)	Communications '72 (1972)

Kenny Clarke/Francy Boland Big Band chronology
November Girl (1970)	Change of Scenes (1971)

Change of Scenes is an album by saxophonist Stan Getz, Francy Boland and the Kenny Clarke/Francy Boland Big Band which was released on the Verve label in 1971.

== Reception ==
Professional ratings
Review scores
Source	Rating
Allmusic	4.5/5 stars

The Allmusic review by Richard S. Ginell stated: "Not only was this Getz's most adventurous session since Focus and the first few bossa nova records, it was very much out of character for Boland, who usually played it safer than this".

== Track listing ==
All compositions by Francy Boland.

1. "Extravagances" - 6:01
2. "Symptones" - 5:47
3. "Quiproquos" - 9:17
4. "Escarmouches" - 4:46
5. "Touchstone" - 6:33
6. "Provocations" - 6:34

== Personnel ==
- Stan Getz - tenor saxophone
- Francy Boland - piano, arranger
- Kenny Clarke - drums
- Benny Bailey, Art Farmer, Rick Kiefer, Manfred Schoof, Ack van Rooyen - trumpet, flugelhorn
- Erik van Lier, Albert Mangelsdorff, Åke Persson - trombone
- Herb Geller - alto saxophone, flute, oboe, English horn
- Ronnie Scott - tenor saxophone
- Stan Sulzmann - tenor saxophone, flute, soprano saxophone
- Tony Coe - tenor saxophone, clarinet
- Sahib Shihab - baritone saxophone, flute, soprano saxophone
- Jean Warland - bass
- Tony Inzalaco - percussion
