= Jimmy Deuchar =

Scottish jazz trumpeter and arranger (1930–1993)

James Deuchar (26 June 1930 – 9 September 1993) was a Scottish jazz trumpeter and big band arranger, born in Dundee, Scotland. He found fame as a performer and arranger in the 1950s and 1960s. Deuchar was taught trumpet by John Lynch, who learned bugle playing as a boy soldier in the First World War, and who later was Director of Brass Music for Dundee.

== Career ==
Deuchar was born in Dundee, Scotland, to a musical family, and started playing trumpet at twelve. In 1945 his family moved to New Malden, Surrey, with Deuchar attending Tiffin School in Kingston upon Thames and playing in a local Boys' Band. He was posted at RAF Uxbridge in West London during his National Service, sitting in at the Club Eleven and joining John Dankworth's band upon his demobilization in May 1950. Deuchar left Dankworth in August 1951, and had spells of various length with bandleaders, including Jack Parnell between April 1952 and January 1953, then with Ronnie Scott until August 1954. From 1954 to 1957 he worked with a number of commercial bands, such as the Oscar Rabin Band and Cyril Stapleton's BBC Show Band, and played intermittently with musicians including Ronnie Scott, Tony Crombie and Tommy Whittle. In 1956 he toured Europe with Lionel Hampton.

From April 1957 to late 1959 he worked with Kurt Edelhagen's orchestra in Germany, then played with Ronnie Scott's quintet from 1960 to 1962 upon his return to Britain. From 1962 until 1966 he worked regularly with Tubby Hayes. As a highly gifted player and a leading exponent of the "modern" style, he was in some demand and achieved success as a touring player in Europe and the United States. He also "sat in" with leading American players at Ronnie Scott's club as musical exchanges were liberalised at the start of the 1960s.

Deuchar played with the Kenny Clarke/Francy Boland Big Band on many occasions in 1963–1971, and moved back to Germany in 1965. He worked as a soloist and staff arranger with the Edelhagen orchestra from 1966, and also did extensive arranging and composing work. In 1971 Deuchar moved to Ealing, London, working freelance, and then to Dundee in the mid-1970s. While mainly active as an arranger, he resumed playing in 1974 and appeared in a number of settings, including the BBC Big Band in London and the BBC Scottish Radio Orchestra in Glasgow.

He died in Dundee in 1993, aged 63.

== Discography ==
=== As leader ===
- Jimmy Deuchar (Discovery, 1953)
- Pal Jimmy! (Tempo 1957, re released on Jasmine, 2002)
- Pub Crawling with Jimmy Deuchar (Contemporary, 1957)
- Music in the Making (Jasmine, 2001)
- Opus de Funk (Jasmine, 2001)
- The Anglo/American/Scottish Connection (Hep, 2004)

=== As guest ===
With Victor Feldman

- Suite Sixteen (Contemporary, 1955 [1958])

With Tubby Hayes

- 1955 Swinging Giant, Vol. 1
- 1962 Late Spot at Scott's
- 1963 A Tribute: Tubbs
- 1966 Night and Day
- 2005 England's Late Jazz Great
- 2005 Live in London, Vol. 2
- 2007 The Little Giant
- 2011 Dancing in the Dark

With Kenny Clarke/Francy Boland Big Band

- Jazz Is Universal (Atlantic, 1962)
- Handle with Care (Atlantic, 1963)
- Now Hear Our Meanin' (Columbia, 1963 [1965])
- Swing, Waltz, Swing (Philips, 1966)
- Sax No End (SABA, 1967)
- Out of the Folk Bag (Columbia, 1967)
- 17 Men and Their Music (Campi, 1967)
- All Smiles (MPS, 1968)
- Faces (MPS, 1969)
- Latin Kaleidoscope (MPS, 1969)
- Fellini 712 (MPS, 1969)
- Let's Face the Music and Dance (1969)
- Big Band Sound of Kenny Clarke & Francy Boland (1973)

With others

- 1961 Live at Ronnie Scott's, Zoot Sims
- 1965 Now Hear Our Meanin' , Kenny Clarke
- 1966 Sound Venture, Georgie Fame/Harry South Big Band
- 1967 Fire, Heat, Soul and Guts, Kenny Clarke
- 1968 Trip to the Mars, Orchester Roland Kovac
- 1969 Ray Warleigh's First Album, Ray Warleigh
- 1970 Midnight Mood, Mark Murphy
- 1986 Live at Fulham Town Hall, Charlie Watts
- 1989 Roarin' , Jack Sharpe
- 2004 Swing Revisited, Johnny Keating
- 2007 An Ace Face, Allen Eager
