= Jazz Is Universal =

Studio album by Kenny Clarke/Francy Boland Big Band
- Released: 1962
- Recorded: December 13, 1961; Cologne, West Germany
- Genre: Jazz
- Length: 37:34
- Label: Atlantic; SD 1401
- Producer: Gigi Campi

Kenny Clarke chronology
| The Golden 8 - Encore! (1961) | Jazz Is Universal (1962) | Handle with Care (1963) |

Jazz Is Universal is an album by the Kenny Clarke/Francy Boland Big Band featuring performances recorded in Germany in 1961 for the Atlantic label. The album was the first by the Big Band although earlier recordings by Kenny Clarke and Francy Boland's Octet had been released previously.

== Reception ==
Professional ratings
Review scores
| Source | Rating |
|---|---|
| AllMusic | 3/5 stars |
| New Record Mirror | 3/5 stars |

AllMusic awarded the album 3 stars.

== Track listing ==
All compositions by Francy Boland except where noted.

1. "Box 703, Washington, D.C." - 5:06
2. "The Styx" - 3:54
3. "Gloria" (Bronisław Kaper) - 4:39
4. "Los Bravos" - 5:03
5. "Charon's Ferry" - 6:10
6. "Volutes" - 6:01
7. "Last Train from Overbrook" (James Moody) - 6:41

== Personnel ==
- Kenny Clarke - drums
- Francy Boland - piano, arranger
- Benny Bailey, Jimmy Deuchar, Maffy Falay, Roger Guérin - trumpet
- Nat Peck, Åke Persson - trombone
- Derek Humble - alto saxophone
- Karl Drewo, Zoot Sims - tenor saxophone
- Sahib Shihab - baritone saxophone, flute
- Jimmy Woode - bass
