= All Smiles (Kenny Clarke/Francy Boland Big Band album) =

Studio album by Kenny Clarke/Francy Boland Big Band
- Released: 1968
- Recorded: May 13–14, 1968
- Studio: Lindström Studios, Cologne, Germany
- Genre: Jazz
- Label: MPS; MPS 15 214
- Producer: Gigi Campi

Kenny Clarke-Francy Boland Big Band chronology
| 17 Men and Their Music (1967) | All Smiles (1968) | Faces (1968) |

Let's Face the Music cover

All Smiles is an album by the Kenny Clarke/Francy Boland Big Band featuring performances recorded in Germany in 1968 and released on the MPS label. The album was also released in the US on Prestige Records as Let's Face the Music.

== Reception ==
Professional ratings
Review scores
| Source | Rating |
|---|---|
| AllMusic | 4/5 stars |
| The Penguin Guide to Jazz Recordings | 3/4 stars |

The AllMusic review says "One of the qualities that set apart this aggregation from others of the same mettle was the smoothness of the playing. Smoothness here means sensuous and bluesy, not lifeless in the sense the term is used in contemporary jazz. There's a bounce to the up-tempo tunes, but the ostentatious playing other bands were noted for is shunned. A fine performance".

== Track listing ==
1. "Let's Face the Music and Dance" (Irving Berlin) – 3:23
2. "I'm All Smiles" (Michael Leonard, Herbert Martin) – 3:25
3. "You Stepped Out of a Dream" (Nacio Herb Brown, Gus Kahn) – 3:03
4. "I'm Glad There Is You" (Jimmy Dorsey, Paul Madeira) – 3:29
5. "Get Out of Town" (Cole Porter) – 4:47
6. "By Strauss" (George Gershwin, Ira Gershwin) – 3:35
7. "When Your Lover Has Gone" (Einar Aaron Swan) – 4:16
8. "Gloria's Theme (from "Butterfield Eight")" (Bronisław Kaper, David Mack) – 4:21
9. "Sweet and Lovely" (Gus Arnheim, Jules LeMare, Harry Tobias) – 3:36
10. "High School Cadets" (John Philip Sousa) – 2:05

== Personnel ==
- Kenny Clarke – drums
- Francy Boland – piano, arranger
- Benny Bailey, Jimmy Deuchar, Sonny Grey, Idrees Sulieman – trumpet
- Nat Peck, Åke Persson, Eric van Lier – trombone
- Derek Humble – alto saxophone
- Johnny Griffin, Ronnie Scott, Tony Coe – tenor saxophone
- Sahib Shihab – baritone saxophone, flute
- Jimmy Woode – bass
- Dave Pike – vibraphone
- Kenny Clare – drums
