= Clarke Boland Big Band en Concert avec Europe 1 =

Live album by Kenny Clarke/Francy Boland Big Band
- Released: 1992
- Recorded: October 29, 1969
- Venue: Théâtre National Populaire, Paris, France
- Genre: Jazz
- Length: 99:59
- Label: Tréma; 710413/4
- Producer: Frank Tenot and Daniel Filipacchi

Kenny Clarke-Francy Boland Big Band chronology
At Her Majesty's Pleasure... (1969)	Clarke Boland Big Band en Concert avec Europe 1 (1992)	Off Limits (1970)

Clarke Boland Big Band en Concert avec Europe 1 is a live album by the Kenny Clarke/Francy Boland Big Band featuring a performance recorded in Paris in 1969, originally broadcast on Europe 1 and released on the Tréma label in 1992.

== Reception ==
Professional ratings
Review scores
Source	Rating
AllMusic	4.5/5 stars
The Penguin Guide to Jazz Recordings	3/4 stars

AllMusic awarded the album 4½ stars stating "the band is quite powerful throughout the set with Griffin generally taking solo honors. Easily recommended".

== Track listing ==
All compositions by Francy Boland except where indicated.

Disc one

1. "Pentonville" - 7:17
2. "All Through the Night" (Cole Porter) - 4:13
3. "Gloria" (Bronisław Kaper) - 5:31
4. "Now Hear My Meaning" (Jimmy Woode) - 7:58
5. "New Box" - 7:03
6. "You Stepped Out of a Dream" (Nacio Herb Brown, Gus Kahn) - 3:29
7. "Volcano" (Kenny Clarke) - 4:28
8. "Box 702" - 15:25

Disc two

1. "The James' are Coming" (Johnny Griffin) - 7:17
2. "I'm Glad There Is You" (Jimmy Dorsey, Paul Madeira) - 5:12
3. "Doing Time" - 5:47
4. "Evanescene" - 3:52
5. "Sonor" (Clarke) - 3:12
6. "Sax No End" - 19:15

== Personnel ==
- Kenny Clarke - drums
- Francy Boland - piano, arranger
- Benny Bailey, Art Farmer, Idrees Sulieman, Derek Watkins - trumpet
- Nat Peck, Åke Persson, Eric van Lier - trombone
- Derek Humble - alto saxophone
- Johnny Griffin, Ronnie Scott, Tony Coe - tenor saxophone
- Sahib Shihab - baritone saxophone
- Jimmy Woode - bass
- Kenny Clare - drums
