= Keg Johnson =

American jazz musician (1908–1967)

Frederic Homer Johnson (November 19, 1908 – November 8, 1967), known professionally as Keg Johnson, was an American jazz trombonist.

== Early life ==
He was born in Dallas, Texas. His father was a choir director there and also worked at a local Studebaker plant where Keg also worked for a while.

He and his younger brother, Budd Johnson, began their musical careers singing and playing first with their father and later with Portia Pittman, daughter of Booker T. Washington. Keg played various instruments but is most noted for the trombone. The two brothers played in Dallas-area bands as the Blue Moon Chasers and later in Ben Smith's Music Makers. Eventually they performed with an Amarillo group led by Gene Coy called the Happy Black Aces.

== Career ==
In the late 1920s, the Johnson brothers played in several bands in Dallas, including Terence Holder’s Dark Clouds of Joy. In 1929 they were playing with Jesse Stone, with whom they travelled to Kansas City and joined George E. Lee.

By 1930, Keg had settled in Chicago playing with Jabbo Smith, Cassino Simpson, and Eddie Mallory, amongst others, before touring and recording with Louis Armstrong from January 1933, and recording his first solo on Armstrong's Basin Street Blues.

In 1933, Keg Johnson went to New York, playing and recording with Benny Carter (1933–4), Fletcher Henderson (February–November 1934) and, in 1935, began his long-running collaboration with Cab Calloway at the Cotton Club.

Johnson remained with Cab Calloway for some 15 years, coinciding with fellow trombonists Claude Jones and DePriest Wheeler and later Tyree Glenn and Quentin Jackson, as well as other musicians such as Dizzy Gillespie, before moving to Los Angeles where he briefly changed careers renovating houses.

During the 1950s, he returned to New York City where he and his brother recorded the album Let's Swing. In 1961, Keg began playing with Ray Charles and was still in his band when Keg died in Chicago on November 8, 1967.

== Personal life ==
His son, Frederic Homer "Keg" Johnson, Jr. (October 24, 1939 — May 16, 2015), was a record producer whose first production was the R&B hit, "Going In Circles", performed by The Friends of Distinction. He also produced the Sylvers, Lakeside, Shalamar, LeVert, The Brothers Johnson, Gene Harris, Bobby Womack, the Blind Boys of Alabama, among others.

== Discography ==
- Ray Charles, Genius + Soul = Jazz (Impulse!, 1961)
- Kenny Clarke/Francy Boland Big Band, Handle with Care (Atlantic, 1963)
- Kenny Clarke/Francy Boland Big Band, Now Hear Our Meanin' (Columbia, 1966)
- Gil Evans, Out of the Cool (Impulse!, 1961)
- Fletcher Henderson, Swing's the Thing (Decca, 1961)
- Budd Johnson, Let's Swing (Prestige Swingville, 1960)
