= Derek Humble =

English jazz saxophonist

Derek Humble (March 1930 – 22 February 1971) was an English jazz alto saxophonist.

Humble was born in Livingston, County Durham, England, and played professionally from his teenage years. He was working with Kathy Stobart by 1950 and played with Vic Lewis in 1951 and Jack Parnell in 1952. He worked with Ronnie Scott from 1953 until 1956, and recorded with Tony Crombie, Victor Feldman, Arnold Ross, Kenny Graham, and Jimmy Deuchar in the 1950s. He played with Oscar Rabin in 1956, then returned to duty under Scott for a tour of the United States.

Humble played with Kurt Edelhagen in Cologne from 1957 to 1967, in addition to recording with Heinz Kretschmar and Dusko Goykovich. He played with Kenny Clarke and Francy Boland in 1961, and soon after became the lead altoist with the Clarke-Boland Big Band. He toured with the group until 1968, when he was seriously injured in a mugging in Cologne; Phil Woods temporarily took over lead alto in Clarke-Boland while he recovered. He played with Gordon Beck in 1969, then returned to Clarke-Boland in 1970, though he was unable to make a full recovery. He played briefly with Phil Seamen in London, shortly before his death in early 1971.

== Discography ==
=== As sideman ===
With Kurt Edelhagen

- Kurt Edelhagen Presents (Polydor, 1957)
- A Toast to the Bands (Polydor, 1959)
- Kurt Edelhagen & Wolfgang Sauer (Amiga, 1965)
- Kurt Edelhagen (Amiga, 1965)

With the Kenny Clarke/Francy Boland Big Band

- The Golden 8 (Blue Note, 1961)
- Jazz Is Universal (Atlantic, 1962)
- Handle with Care (Atlantic, 1963)
- Now Hear Our Meanin' (Columbia, 1966)
- Swing, Waltz, Swing (Philips, 1966)
- Sax No End (SABA, 1967)
- Out of the Folk Bag (Columbia, 1967)
- 17 Men and Their Music (Campi, 1967)
- All Smiles (MPS, 1968)
- Latin Kaleidoscope (MPS, 1968)
- Fellini 712 (MPS, 1969)
- All Blues (MPS, 1969)
- More Smiles (MPS, 1969)
- Faces (MPS, 1971)
- Off Limits (Polydor, 1971)
- The Second Greatest Jazz Big Band in the World (Black Lion, 1972)
- Open Door (Muse, 1975)
- November Girl with Carmen McRae (Black Lion, 1976)
- Clarke Boland Big Band en Concert avec Europe 1 (Tréma, 1992)

With others

- Jimmy Deuchar, Pub Crawling (Contemporary, 1957)
- Jimmy Deuchar, Pal Jimmy (Tempo, 1958)
- Victor Feldman, In London Vol. 2 Big Band (Tempo, 1957)
- Victor Feldman, Suite Sixteen (Contemporary, 1958)
- Mark Murphy, Midnight Mood (SABA, 1968)
- Bill Ramsey, Paul Kuhn, Ballads & Blues (Columbia, 1965)
- Ronnie Scott, Presenting the Ronnie Scott Sextet (Philips, 1957)
