= All Blues (Clarke-Boland Big Band album) =

Studio album by Kenny Clarke/Francy Boland Big Band
- Released: 1971
- Recorded: May 27, 1969
- Studio: Lindström Studios, Cologne, Germany
- Genre: Jazz
- Length: 34:35
- Label: MPS; MPS 15 288
- Producer: Gigi Campi

Kenny Clarke-Francy Boland Big Band chronology
Rue Chaptal (1969)	All Blues (1971)	More Smiles (1969)

All Blues is an album by the Kenny Clarke/Francy Boland Big Band featuring performances recorded in Germany in 1969 and released on the MPS label.

== Reception ==
Professional ratings
Review scores
Source	Rating
AllMusic	3/5 stars

AllMusic awarded the album 3 stars.

== Track listing ==
All compositions by Francy Boland, except where indicated.

1. "The Wildman" (Kenny Clarke) - 6:19
2. "The Jamfs are Coming" (Johnny Griffin) - 5:55
3. "At Ronnie's" (Benny Bailey) - 4:23
4. "All Blues 1st Movement: Open Door" - 5:18
5. "All Blues 2nd Movement: Dia Blue" - 9:22
6. "All Blues 3rd Movement: Total Blues" - 2:58

== Personnel ==
- Kenny Clarke - drums
- Francy Boland - piano, arranger
- Benny Bailey, Tony Fisher, Duško Gojković, Idrees Sulieman - trumpet
- Nat Peck, Åke Persson, Eric van Lier - trombone
- Derek Humble - alto saxophone
- Johnny Griffin, Ronnie Scott, Tony Coe - tenor saxophone
- Sahib Shihab - baritone saxophone, flute
- Jean Warland (tracks 1 & 6), Jimmy Woode (tracks 2–5) - bass
