= Out of the Folk Bag =

Studio album by Clarke-Boland Big Band
- Released: 1967
- Recorded: July 31, 1967; EMI Studios, Cologne, West Germany
- Genre: Jazz
- Label: Columbia; SMC 74 323
- Producer: Gigi Campi

Kenny Clarke-Francy Boland Big Band chronology
Sax No End (1967)	Out of the Folk Bag (1967)	Jazz Convention Vol. I (1967)

Out of the Folk Bag is an album by the Kenny Clarke/Francy Boland Big Band featuring performances recorded in Cologne in 1967 for the German Columbia label. The album features big band interpretations of traditional songs from around the world.

== Track listing ==
1. "Belgium: Nice Bunch" (Bosseret) - 2:58
2. "England: Greensleeves" (Trad.) - 4:00
3. "Italy: Funiculì, Funiculà" (Luigi Denza) - 3:27
4. "Poland: Nights in Warsaw" (Trad.) - 3:07
5. "USA: I Don't Want Nothin" (Trad.) - 4:25
6. "Turkey: The Turk" (Trad.) - 1:52
7. "Canada: Here The Good Wind Comes" (Trad.) - 5:49
8. "Jugoslavia: Return" (Trad.) - 3:40
9. "Sweden: Dear Old Stockholm" (Trad.) - 4:51

== Personnel ==
- Kenny Clarke - drums
- Francy Boland - piano, arranger
- Benny Bailey, Jimmy Deuchar, Shake Keane, Idrees Sulieman - trumpet
- Torolf Mølgaard, Nat Peck, Eric van Lier - trombone
- Derek Humble - alto saxophone
- Carl Drevo, Johnny Griffin, Ronnie Scott - tenor saxophone
- Sahib Shihab - baritone saxophone, flute
- Jimmy Woode - bass
- Fats Sadi - vibraphone, percussion
