= Eje Thelin =

Swedish trombonist

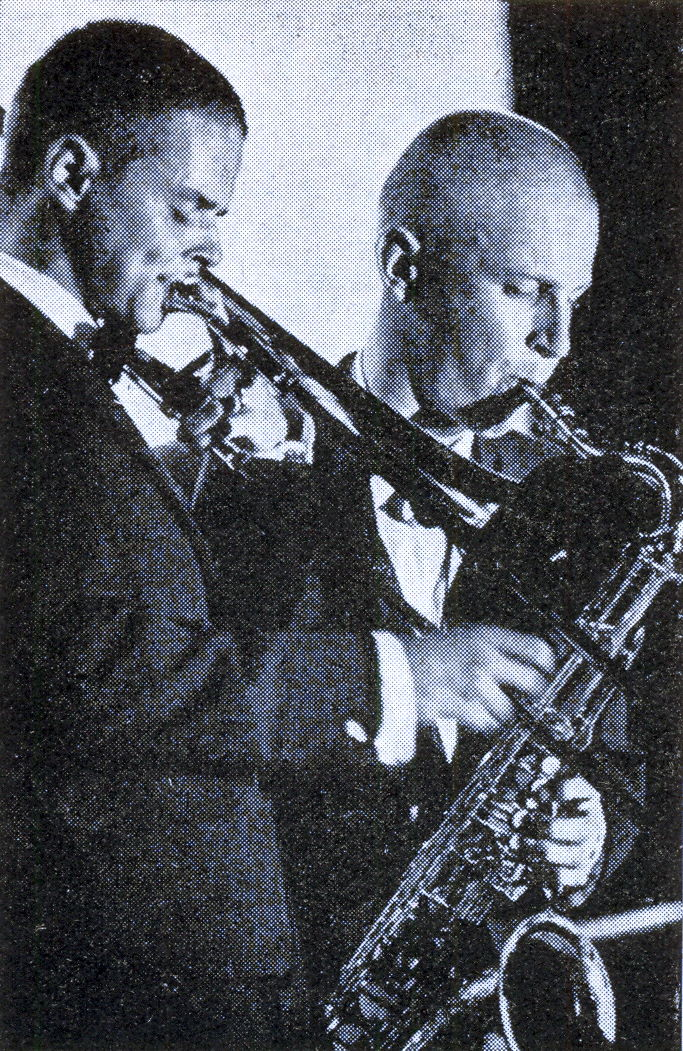
- Thelin (left) and Ulf Andersson in 1963

Background information
- Born: Eilert Ove Thelin; 9 June 1938; Jönköping, Sweden
- Died: 18 May 1990 (aged 51) Stockholm, Sweden
- Genres: Jazz
- Occupation: Musician
- Instrument: Trombone

Eilert Ove "Eje" Thelin (9 June 1938 – 18 May 1990) was a Swedish jazz trombonist.

== Biography ==
Thelin, who was self-taught as a musician, started playing with the dixieland group Pygmé Jazz Band, and later joined the sextet of Putte Wickman. Influenced by Miles Davis among others, he then moved towards modern jazz. Thelin led his own quintet from 1961 until 1965, touring in Europe on several occasions.

Disillusioned with the Swedish jazz scene, Thelin moved to Austria in 1968, where he taught at the Academy of Music in Graz, while also performing free improvised music with a group led by himself and Joachim Kühn in several European countries. After returning to Stockholm in 1972, he led his own Eje Thelin Group in Sweden for the rest of the 1970's, moving towards jazz fusion and experimenting with electronics. Thelin would later mainly devote himself to composing and performing as a soloist.

During his career, Thelin performed and collaborated with Roy Brooks, Graham Collier, Palle Danielsson, Joe Harris, Joachim Kühn, Evan Parker, George Russell, John Surman and Kenny Wheeler.

== Discography ==
=== As leader ===
- Acoustic Space (Odeon, 1970)
- Candles Of Vision (Calig, 1972) – with Pierre Favre and Jouck Minor
- Club Jazz 8 (SR Records, 1973)
- Bits & Pieces (Phono Suecia, 1980)
- Polyglot (Caprice, 1981)
- E. T. Project Live At Nefertiti (Dragon, 1986)
- 1966 (Dragon, 2003) – with Barney Wilen
- Graz 1969 (Dragon, 2005) – with Palle Danielsson and John Preininger

With Eje Thelin Group

- Eje Thelin Group (Caprice, 1975)
- Live '76 (Caprice, 1977)
- Hypothesis (MRC/Electrola, 1979)
- Night Music 1974 (BE! Jazz, 2015)

With Eje Thelin Quintet

- Jazz Jamboree 1962 Vol. 2 (Polskie Nagrania Muza, 1962)
- So Far (Columbia [EMI], 1963)
- At The German Jazz Festival (Metronome, 1964)

With Eje Thelin Trio

- 1965 (Dragon, 2016) – with Bengt Hallberg

With The New Joachim Kühn–Eje Thelin Group

- In Paris (Metronome, 1970)

=== As composer ===
- Swedish Radio Jazz Group: Raggruppamento (Phono Suecia, 1991)

=== As sideman ===
- Don Cherry: Eternal Rhythm (MPS, 1969)
- Clarinet Summit: You Better Fly Away (MPS, 1980)
- Graham Collier: Hoarded Dreams (Cuneiform, 1983 [2007])
- Klaus Doldinger: Jubilee (Atlantic, 1973)
- Léon Francioli: Live In Montreux (Evasion Disques, 1972) – with Pierre Favre and Jouk Minor
- Benny Golson: Stockholm Sojourn (Prestige, 1965)
- Karin Krog: Different Days, Different Ways (Philips, 1976)
- Rolf and Joachim Kühn: Monday Morning (Hör Zu, 1969)
- Kenny Wheeler: Around 6 (ECM, 1979)
- Jimmy Witherspoon: Some of My Best Friends Are the Blues (Prestige, 1964)
- Monica Zetterlund: Monica Zetterlund (Philips, 1967)
