= Fellini 712 =

Studio album by Kenny Clarke/Francy Boland Big Band
- Released: 1969
- Recorded: December 2 & 3, 1968
- Studio: Lindström Studios, Cologne, Germany
- Genre: Jazz
- Length: 33:48
- Label: MPS; MPS 15 220
- Producer: Gigi Campi

Kenny Clarke-Francy Boland Big Band chronology
Latin Kaleidoscope (1968)	Fellini 712 (1969)	Volcano (1969)

Fellini 712 is an album by the Kenny Clarke/Francy Boland Big Band featuring performances recorded in Germany in 1969 and released on the MPS label.

== Reception ==
Professional ratings
Review scores
Source	Rating
AllMusic	3/5 stars

AllMusic awarded the album 3 stars. On All About Jazz, Douglas Payne said "Boland's Fellini 712 suite is an ambitious, slightly more avant-garde take on Latin themes that is a testament to Boland's substantial abilities as a writer and arranger. This suite, named for Italian director Federico Fellini and a reference to Rome's 712-kilometre distance from the French border, was the result of an invitation for the band to perform in Rome during 1968. Boland was inspired by the band's "dolce vita" Roman holiday and named his three movements after their hotel, the location of the studio where they performed and a café popular among musicians and artists. During this suite, it's as if the band coalesces before your ears into one brilliant entity, each individual providing light and shadow to the collective whole. It is the magic Boland works in his pieces, but it's brought alive by the enthusiastic playing of the band members".

== Track listing ==
All compositions by Francy Boland.

1. "1st Movement: Villa Radieuse" - 11:36
2. "2nd Movement: Tween Dusk and Dawn in Via Urbania" - 6:52
3. "3rd Movement: Rosati at Popolo Square" - 15:20

== Personnel ==
- Kenny Clarke - drums
- Francy Boland - piano, arranger
- Benny Bailey, Jimmy Deuchar, Duško Gojković, Idrees Sulieman - trumpet
- Nat Peck, Åke Persson, Eric van Lier - trombone
- Derek Humble - alto saxophone
- Johnny Griffin, Ronnie Scott, Tony Coe - tenor saxophone
- Sahib Shihab - baritone saxophone, flute
- Jean Warland - bass
- Kenny Clare - drums
