= Quincy – Here We Come =

Quincy - Here We Come

Studio album by Benny Bailey
- Released: 1959
- Recorded: October 8, 1959
- Studio: Millessalen Recording Studios in Stockholm, Sweden
- Genre: Jazz
- Label: Metronome; MLP 15030
- Producer: Nat Hentoff

Benny Bailey chronology
Quincy - Here We Come (1959)	Big Brass (1960)

The Music of Quincy Jones cover

Quincy – Here We Come is an album led by trumpeter Benny Bailey, trombonist Åke Persson and drummer Joe Harris featuring performances recorded in Sweden in 1959 and originally released on the Swedish Metronome label. The album was released in the US in 1960 as The Music of Quincy Jones on Argo Records. The album is one of the earliest devoted solely to the compositions of Quincy Jones and emerged from his work in Europe in the late 1950s.

== Reception ==
Professional ratings
Review scores
Source	Rating
Allmusic	3/5 stars

Allmusic awarded the album 3 stars.

== Track listing ==
All compositions by Quincy Jones

1. "The Golden Touch" (Jones, Oscar Pettiford) - 5:01
2. "Jones Beach" - 4:52
3. "The Midnight Sun Never Sets" (Jones, Dorcas Cochran, Henri Salvador) - 4:55
4. "I'm Gone" (Jones, King Pleasure) - 5:15
5. "Meet Benny Bailey" - 2:48
6. "Count 'Em" (Jones, Jimmy Cleveland) - 7:33
7. "Fallen Feathers" - 3:30
8. "Plenty, Plenty Soul" (Jones, Milt Jackson) - 3:32

== Personnel ==
- Benny Bailey - trumpet (tracks 1, 2, 4, 5 & 7)
- Åke Persson - trombone (tracks 1, 3, 4–6 & 8)
- Arne Domnérus - alto saxophone (tracks 2, 4 & 5)
- Bjarne Nerem - tenor saxophone (tracks 4–6)
- Gunnar Svensson (track 1), Gösta Theselius (tracks 3–6) - piano
- Lennart Jansson (tracks 1, 4, 5 & 8) - baritone saxophone
- Gunnar Johnson - bass
- Anders Burman (tracks 3 & 6), Joe Harris (tracks 1, 2, 4, 5, 7 & 8) - drums
