= Fatty George =

Austrian jazz musician

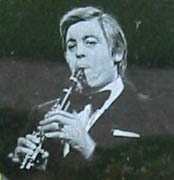
Fatty George, as depicted on his gravestone

Franz Georg Pressler (24 April 1927 – 29 March 1982), known by the stage name Fatty George was an Austrian jazz clarinettist, alto saxophonist, and band leader.

George began playing the alto saxophone as a teenager and was educated as a clarinetist at the Vienna Academy (now the University of Music and Performing Arts Vienna). In 1947 he founded his own bop group, Hot Club Seven, and in 1955 founded the nightclub Jazz Casino in Vienna. When that club closed in 1958, he rebounded by opening Fatty’s Saloon which became an important jazz venue in Austria. In the 1950s he was the leader of the Two Sounds Band whose other members included trumpeter Oscar Klein, saxophonist Karl Drewo, pianist and vibraphonist Bill Grah, and keyboardist and composer Joe Zawinul. He later led a group called the Chicago Jazz Band in the 1970s, and remained active as bandleader until his death in 1982.
