= November Girl =

Studio album by Carmen McRae and the Kenny Clarke/Francy Boland Big Band
- Released: 1975
- Recorded: November 3, 1970
- Studio: Lansdowne Studios, London
- Genre: Jazz
- Length: 34:25
- Label: Black Lion; BLP 30172
- Producer: Gigi Campi

Carmen McRae chronology
Ms. Jazz (1974)	November Girl (1975)	Can't Hide Love (1976)

Kenny Clarke/Francy Boland Big Band chronology
Off Limits (1970)	November Girl (1970 (1975))	Change of Scenes (1971)

November Girl is an album by vocalist Carmen McRae and the Kenny Clarke/Francy Boland Big Band recorded in London in 1970 and originally released on the Black Lion label in 1975.

== Reception ==
Professional ratings
Review scores
Source	Rating
AllMusic	3.5/5 stars

The AllMusic review by Ken Dryden stated "The Kenny Clarke-Francy Boland Big Band didn't record too often with vocalists, so this meeting with Carmen McRae had a lot of potential. McRae was likely seeing most of these songs for the first take at the recording sessions, since almost all are originals written by the bandmembers. She's game and does her best, but several tracks are badly dated by Boland's insistence upon using an inferior electric piano, whereas no piano at all on these performances would have sounded far better. ...This is a good session that could have been far better without the cheesy electronics".

== Track listing ==
All compositions by Jimmy Woode, except where indicated.

1. "November Girl" (Jimmy Woode, Francy Boland) – 4:36
2. "Just Give Me Time" (Boland) – 2:22
3. "'Tis Autumn" (Henry Nemo) – 4:24
4. "A Handful of Soul" (Dusko Gojkovic, Woode) – 4:09
5. "Dear Death" – 4:18
6. "I Don't Want Nothing from Nobody" (Woode, Kenny Clarke) – 4:25
7. "You're Getting to Be a Habit with Me" (Harry Warren, Al Dubin) – 4:05
8. "My Kind of World" – 3:13
9. "This Could Be the Start of Something Big" (Steve Allen) – 2:36 Bonus track on CD reissue

== Personnel ==
- Carmen McRae – vocals
- Francy Boland – piano, keyboards, arranger
- Kenny Clarke – drums
- Benny Bailey, Art Farmer, Duško Gojković, Idrees Sulieman – trumpet
- Nat Peck, Åke Persson, Eric van Lier – trombone
- Tony Coe, Derek Humble, Billy Mitchell, Ronnie Scott, Sahib Shihab – reeds
- Jimmy Woode – bass
- Kenny Clare – drums
- Dizzy Gillespie – snare drum (track 2)
