= Summer Dawn =

Studio album by Sahib Shihab
- Released: 1964
- Recorded: May 8–9, 1963; Cologne, West Germany
- Genre: Jazz
- Length: 38:02
- Label: Argo; LP-742
- Producer: Gigi Campi

Sahib Shihab chronology
Sahib's Jazz Party (1963)	Summer Dawn (1964)	Sahib Shihab and the Danish Radio Jazz Group (1965)

Summer Dawn is an album by American jazz saxophonist/flautist Sahib Shihab recorded in 1964 for the Argo label.

== Reception ==
Professional ratings
Review scores
Source	Rating
AllMusic	3/5 stars

The AllMusic site gave the album 3 stars.

== Track listing ==
All compositions by Sahib Shihab.

1. "Lillemore" - 7:58
2. "Please Don't Leave Me" - 9:47
3. "Waltz for Seth" - 6:19
4. "Campi's Idea" - 8:27
5. "Herr Fixit" - 5:31

== Personnel ==
- Sahib Shihab - alto saxophone, baritone saxophone, flute
- Åke Persson - trombone
- Francy Boland - piano
- Jimmy Woode - bass
- Kenny Clarke - drums
- Joe Harris - bongos
