= Basie in Sweden =

Live album by Count Basie and His Orchestra
- Released: 1962
- Recorded: August 10–12, 1962
- Venue: Dans In, Gröna Lund (Stockholm, Sweden)
- Genre: Jazz
- Label: Roulette
- Producer: Teddy Reig

Count Basie chronology
Back with Basie (1962)	Basie in Sweden (1962)	Sinatra–Basie: An Historic Musical First (1962)

Basie in Sweden (subtitled Recorded Live in Concert featuring Louis Bellson on Drums) is a live album by pianist, composer and bandleader Count Basie, featuring tracks recorded at an amusement park in Sweden in 1962 and originally released on the Roulette label.

== Reception ==
Professional ratings
Review scores
Source	Rating
AllMusic	4.5/5 stars

AllMusic awarded the album 4½ stars.

== Track listing ==
1. "Little Pony" (Neal Hefti) – 2:25
2. "Plymouth Rock" (Hefti) – 7:00
3. "Backwater Blues" (Bessie Smith) – 5:06
4. "Who Me" (Frank Foster) – 3:23
5. "April in Paris" (Vernon Duke, Yip Harburg) – 3:30
6. "Backstage Blues" (Don Elliott, Terry Gibbs, Urbie Green) – 5:00
7. "Good Time Blues" (Ernie Wilkins) – 5:00
8. "Peace Pipe" (Wilkins) – 4:35
- Recorded at the Dans In at Gröna Lund in Stockholm, Sweden, on August 10 (track 5), August 11 (tracks 1, 2, 4, 6 & 7) & August 12 (tracks 3 & 8), 1962

== Personnel ==
- Count Basie – piano
- Benny Bailey (tracks 1, 4 & 6), Al Aarons, Sonny Cohn, Thad Jones, Fip Ricard – trumpet
- Henry Coker, Quentin Jackson, Åke Persson (tracks 1, 4 & 6), Benny Powell – trombone
- Marshal Royal, Frank Wess – alto saxophone
- Eric Dixon, Frank Foster – tenor saxophone
- Charlie Fowlkes – baritone saxophone
- Freddie Green – guitar
- Ike Isaacs – bass
- Louis Bellson – drums
- Irene Reid – vocals (track 3)
