= Jazz Sahib =

Studio album by Sahib Shihab
- Released: 1957
- Recorded: July 9 and November 7, 1957
- Studio: Van Gelder, Hackensack
- Genre: Jazz
- Length: 44:34
- Label: Savoy; MG 12124
- Producer: Ozzie Cadena

Sahib Shihab chronology
The Jazz We Heard Last Summer (1957)	Jazz Sahib (1957)	Sahib's Jazz Party (1963)

Jazz Sahib is an album by American jazz saxophonist Sahib Shihab recorded in 1957 for the Savoy label.

== Reception ==
Professional ratings
Review scores
Source	Rating
Allmusic	3/5 stars

The Allmusic review by Ron Wynn states: "This excellent reissue spotlights great groups Sahib worked with in late 50s".

== Track listing ==
All compositions by Sahib Shihab, except where indicated.

1. "S.M.T.W.T.F.S.S. Blues" - 4:56
2. "Jamila" - 5:33
3. "The Moors" (Melba Liston) - 7:19
4. "Blu-a-Round" - 10:17
5. "Le' Sneak" - 5:49
6. "Ballad to the East" (Liston) - 4:41
7. "Ba-Dut-Du-Dat" (Liston) - 5:59 Bonus track on CD reissue

Note

- Recorded at Van Gelder Studio in Hackensack, New Jersey on July 9 (tracks 1–3) and November 7 (tracks 4–7), 1957

== Personnel ==
- Sahib Shihab - baritone saxophone
- Phil Woods - alto saxophone
- Benny Golson - tenor saxophone
- Bill Evans (tracks 4–7), Hank Jones (tracks 1–3) - piano
- Paul Chambers (tracks 1–3), Oscar Pettiford (tracks 4–7) - bass
- Art Taylor - drums
