= Big Brass =

Studio album by Benny Bailey
- Released: 1960
- Recorded: November 25, 1960
- Studio: Nola Penthouse Studio, New York City
- Genre: Jazz
- Length: 39:53
- Label: Candid; CJS 9011
- Producer: Nat Hentoff

Benny Bailey chronology
Quincy - Here We Come (1959)	Big Brass (1960)	Midnight in Europe (1964)

Big Brass is an album by trumpeter Benny Bailey featuring performances recorded in late 1960 and originally released on the Candid label.

== Reception ==
Professional ratings
Review scores
Source	Rating
Allmusic	4.5/5 stars
The Penguin Guide to Jazz Recordings	3/4 stars

Ken Dryden of Allmusic says, "Big Brass marks one of trumpeter Benny Bailey's earliest efforts as a leader, but it is also one of the best releases of his career. ...The entire session has a relaxed air, as if old friends got together to play some well-rehearsed material, so it is warmly recommended".

== Track listing ==
1. "Hard Sock Dance" (Quincy Jones) - 5:47
2. "Alison" (Hale Smith) - 6:46
3. "Tipsy" (Oliver Nelson) - 6:54
4. "Please Say Yes" (Tom McIntosh) - 5:58
5. "A Kiss to Build a Dream On" (Bert Kalmar, Harry Ruby, Oscar Hammerstein II) - 8:03
6. "Maud's Mood" (Benny Bailey) - 6:25

== Personnel ==
- Benny Bailey - trumpet
- Julius Watkins - French horn (tracks 1, 4 & 6)
- Phil Woods - alto saxophone, bass clarinet (tracks 1, 4 & 6)
- Les Spann - guitar, flute
- Tommy Flanagan - piano
- Buddy Catlett - bass
- Art Taylor - drums
