= Fats Sadi =

Belgian jazz musician, vocalist, and composer

"Fats" Sadi Pol Lallemand (23 October 1927, Andenne, Belgium – 20 February 2009, Huy) was a Belgian jazz musician, vocalist, and composer who played vibraphone and percussion. He chose the name "Sadi" because he disliked his last name, which means "the German" in French. He led a quartet and nonet and won the Belgian Golden Django for best French-speaking artist in 1996.

== Career ==
His first instrument was xylophone, which he played in a circus in the 1930s. After World War II, he turned professional playing the vibraphone. He performed with Bobby Jaspar in the Bob Shots, then with Don Byas. From 1950 to 1961, he lived in Paris, where he played with Aimé Barelli, Django Reinhardt, and Martial Solal.

In the 1960s, he moved to Brussels, Belgium, and was a member of Kenny Clarke/Francy Boland Big Band. He worked for RTBF, the TV channel of the French Community in Belgium. Sadi became seriously ill in January 1995 and appeared rarely on stage.

== Discography ==
=== As leader ===
- The Swinging Fats Sadi Combo (Blue Note, 1954)
- Mr. Fats Sadi, His Vibes and His Friends (MPS, 1966)

=== As sideman ===
With Don Byas

- Don Byas featuring Mary Lou Williams & Beryl Booker (Vogue, 1953)
- Memorial (Vogue, 1973)
- Don Byas (Inner City, 1980)

With Kenny Clarke/Francy Boland Big Band

- Handle with Care (Atlantic, 1963)
- Swing, Waltz, Swing (Philips, 1966)
- Sax No End (SABA, 1967)
- Out of the Folk Bag (Columbia, 1967)
- 17 Men and Their Music (Campi, 1967)
- Faces (MPS, 1971)

With Bobby Jaspar

- Bobby Jaspar & His Modern Jazz (Vogue, 1954–1955)
- Bobby Jaspar/Henri Renaud (Vogue, 1953–1954)

With Sahib Shihab

- Seeds (Vogue Schallplatten, 1970)
- Companionship (Vogue Schallplatten, 1971)

With others

- André Hodeir, The Vogue Sessions (Vogue)
- Django Reinhardt, Bruxelles/Paris (Musidisc, 1938–1953)
- Zoot Sims, Jazz in Paris: Zoot Sims & Henri Renaud (EmArcy)
- Martial Solal, The Complete Vogue Recordings Vol. 2 (Vogue, 1953–56) – Quartet co-led by Fats Sadi
