= Stockholm Sojourn =

Studio album by Benny Golson
- Released: 1965
- Recorded: July 14, 1964; Stockholm, Sweden
- Genre: Jazz
- Length: 40:51
- Label: Prestige; PR 7361
- Producer: Lew Futterman

Benny Golson chronology
The Roland Kirk Quartet Meets the Benny Golson Orchestra (1963)	Stockholm Sojourn (1965)	Tune In, Turn On (1963)

Stockholm Sojourn is an album by the International Jazz Orchestra directed by Benny Golson which was recorded in Sweden in 1964 and originally released on the Prestige label.

== Reception ==
Professional ratings
Review scores
Source	Rating
AllMusic	3/5 stars
The Penguin Guide to Jazz Recordings	3/4 stars

The AllMusic review states, "Golson, who does not play at all on this set, seemed inspired by the large instrumentation -- a full orchestra with trumpets, trombones, French horns, several English horns doubling on oboes, five reeds, up to six additional flutes and a pianoless rhythm section -- and his charts (six of his originals and three standards) are both inventive and full of subtle surprises".

== Track listing ==
All compositions by Benny Golson except as indicated

1. "Stockholm Sojourn" - 4:35
2. "Tryst" - 3:25
3. "Are You Real?" - 3:20
4. "Goodbye" (Gordon Jenkins) - 6:36
5. "Waltz for Debby" (Bill Evans) - 4:25
6. "My Foolish Heart" (Ned Washington, Victor Young) - 5:25
7. "A Swedish Villa" - 3:49
8. "I Remember Clifford" - 4:46
9. "The Call" - 4:30

== Collective personnel ==
- Benny Golson - arranger, conductor
- Benny Bailey, Bosse Broberg, Bertil Lövgren, Bengt-Arne Wallin - trumpet
- Grachan Moncur III, Åke Persson, Eje Thelin, Georg Vernon, Jörgen Johansson - trombone
- Carl Nyström, Bengt Olsson, Elis Kårvall, Willem Foch - French horn
- Runo Ericksson - euphonium
- Lars Skoglund - oboe, English horn
- Alf Nilsson, Ingvar Holst, Erik Björkhager - oboe
- Bengt Christiansson, Nils Wahrby, Yngve Sandström, Gösta Ströberg, Ulf Bergström - flute
- Arne Domnérus - alto saxophone, clarinet
- Claes Rosendahl - tenor saxophone
- Bjarne Nerem - tenor saxophone
- Cecil Payne - baritone saxophone
- Rune Falk - baritone saxophone, clarinet
- Torsten Wennberg- saxophone, clarinet
- Roman Dylag - bass
- Egil Johansen - drums

== Sources ==
- Harry Nicolausson - Swedish Jazz Discography, Stockholm 1983.
