= Live in Stockholm (Don Cherry album) =

Live album by Don Cherry
- Released: 2013
- Recorded: September 2, 1968; July 3, 1971
- Venue: ABF House, Sveavägen, Stockholm; Museum of Modern Art, Stockholm
- Genre: Free jazz
- Length: 1:17:14
- Label: Caprice Records; CAP 21836

Live in Stockholm is a live album by multi-instrumentalist Don Cherry. Two tracks were recorded on September 2, 1968, at the ABF House in Sveavägen, Stockholm, while the remaining track was recorded on July 3, 1971, at the Museum of Modern Art in Stockholm. The album was released on CD and LP by Caprice Records in 2013, and features Cherry on trumpet, flute, piano, percussion, and vocals, accompanied by saxophonists Bernt Rosengren and Tommy Koverhult, trumpeter Maffy Falay, bassists Torbjörn Hultcrantz and Rolf Olsson, and drummers Leif Wennerström and Okay Temiz.

== Reception ==
Professional ratings
Review scores
Source	Rating
All About Jazz	4.5/5 stars
The Guardian	3/5 stars
The Free Jazz Collective	3.5/5 stars

In a review for All About Jazz, Florence Wetzel wrote: "this release offers a full-bodied experience of Cherry's activities during this fruitful period of his musical journey... These four-dimensional sonic sculptures are praise songs; they create an atmosphere of celebration that explores and brings forth an open, joyful creativity that's infused with a sense of equality... This fine release is permeated with a spirit of harmony, offering a message that's still extremely welcome today."

The Guardian's John Fordham stated: "The 1960s free jazz of Coleman and John Coltrane inevitably influences this often loosely clamorous ensemble music, but startling composed parts frequently rise amid the swirl... expressionistic optimism and faith in intuition imbue all of this warm, soulful, and sketchily conceived music."

Mike Shanley, writing for Jazz Times, commented: "It would be a few more years before Don Cherry would start playing his version of world music wholeheartedly, but elements of the trumpeter's all-encompassing vision can be heard on these live recordings... the inspiration never wanes."

A reviewer for The Free Jazz Collective wrote: "It is such a joy to hear his music, and the all-inclusive approach, that even the lesser moments are taken without regret and even with feelings of generosity... This is not his best album, but fans of the artist should not miss this one, and it will in any case lift everyone's spirits. Guaranteed!"

In an article for Dusted Magazine, Jason Bivins remarked: "The music isn't absolutely essential, nor is it consistently compelling. But it's committed and insistent in its push beyond idiomatic limits."

== Track listing ==
"ABF Suite, Part 1" is based on tunes by Don Cherry. "ABF Suite, Part 2" is a collective improvisation using tunes by Don Cherry and Turkish folk melodies collected by Maffy Falay. "Another Dome Session" was composed by Don Cherry.

1. "ABF Suite, Part 1" – 22:49
2. "ABF Suite, Part 2" – 26:21
3. "Another Dome Session" – 28:06
- Tracks 1 and 2 were recorded on September 2, 1968, at the ABF House in Sveavägen, Stockholm. Track 3 was recorded on July 3, 1971, at the Museum of Modern Art in Stockholm.

== Personnel ==
- Don Cherry – trumpet, flute, piano, percussion, vocals
- Bernt Rosengren – tenor saxophone, flute, percussion (tracks 1 and 2)
- Tommy Koverhult – tenor saxophone, flute, percussion
- Maffy Falay – trumpet, flute, percussion
- Torbjörn Hultcrantz – bass (tracks 1 and 2)
- Rolf Olsson – bass (track 3)
- Leif Wennerström – drums (tracks 1 and 2)
- Okay Temiz – drums (track 3)
