= Sahib's Jazz Party =

Live album by Sahib Shihab
- Released: 1964
- Recorded: October 3, 1963
- Venue: Jazzhus Montmartre, Copenhagen, Denmark
- Genre: Jazz
- Length: 72:11
- Label: Debut; MG 12124
- Producer: Ole Vestergaard

Sahib Shihab chronology
Jazz Sahib (1957)	Sahib's Jazz Party (1964)	Summer Dawn (1964)

Sahib's Jazz Party (also released as Conversations) is a live album by American jazz saxophonist/flautist Sahib Shihab recorded at the Jazzhus Montmartre in Copenhagen in 1963 and first released on the Debut label.

== Reception ==
Professional ratings
Review scores
Source	Rating
Allmusic	4.5/5 stars

The Allmusic review by Scott Yanow states: "This surprising music is well worth several listens and shows that Shihab was a much more diverse player than is usually thought".

== Track listing ==
All compositions by Sahib Shihab, except where noted.

1. "4070 Blues" - 12:02
2. "Charade" (Henry Mancini, Johnny Mercer) - 7:50
3. "Conversations Part I" - 10:40
4. "Conversations Part II" - 3:10
5. "Conversations Part III" - 9:00
6. "Billy Boy" (Traditional) - 12:21 Bonus track on CD reissue
7. "Not Yet" - 10:47 Bonus track on CD reissue
8. "Someday My Prince Will Come" (Frank Churchill, Larry Morey) - 6:40 Bonus track on CD reissue

== Personnel ==
- Sahib Shihab - curved soprano saxophone, baritone saxophone, flute
- Allan Botschinsky - flugelhorn
- Ole Molin - guitar
- Niels-Henning Ørsted Pedersen - bass
- Alex Riel - drums
- Bjarne Rostvold - snare drum
