= Rudolf Josel =

Rudolf Josel is a retired Austrian trombonist. He was the principal trombonist in the Wiener Philharmonic orchestra from 1964 to 2000.

== Awards ==
2008: Grand Decoration of Honor in Silver for Services to the Republic of Austria
