= Nat Peck =

- Born: January 13, 1925; New York City, U.S.
- Died: October 24, 2015 (aged 90) London, England
- Genres: Jazz
- Instrument: Trombone
- Years active: 1943–1990s

Nathan Peck (January 13, 1925 – October 24, 2015) was an American jazz trombonist.

== Early life ==
Peck was born in New York City on January 13, 1925. His father was a cinema projectionist. Peck began playing the trombone as a teenager.

== Career ==
After leaving high school Peck was drafted into the army and became part of Glenn Miller's band. He remained with the band until after World War II ended. He played with Don Redman in 1947. He studied classical music at the Paris Conservatory from 1949 to 1951, while playing and recording with leading jazz musicians such as Coleman Hawkins (1949), James Moody (1949–50), and Roy Eldridge (1950). In the 1950s Peck played on television in New York, and in 1953 he recorded with Dizzy Gillespie. Peck shuttled between Paris and New York until 1957, when he married dancer Vera Tietz and settled in France.

In France, Peck played with Michel Legrand, André Hodeir and Duke Ellington. Peck spent some time in England and Germany, working as a staff musician at Sender Freies Berlin and playing with Quincy Jones and the Clarke-Boland Big Band (1963–69). He relocated to London in 1965, where he became active in the studios, film, and television. He played with Benny Goodman in 1970–72 and with Peter Herbolzheimer in 1979.

Latterly, Peck worked mainly as a contractor with his company, London Studio Orchestras. While this led to him ending his playing career, he shifted his talents to putting together the best blend of session musicians that he could find. 'The Italian Job', 'Yentl', 'The 3 Muskateers', and many more great films, especially with French composers Michel Legrand and Philippe Sarde.

== Death ==
Peck died on October 24, 2015. His death left trumpeter Ray Anthony as the last living member of Glenn Miller's band.

== Discography ==
With the Kenny Clarke/Francy Boland Big Band:

- Jazz Is Universal (Atlantic, 1962)
- Handle with Care (Atlantic, 1963)
- Now Hear Our Meanin' (Columbia, 1963 [1965])
- Swing, Waltz, Swing (Philips, 1966)
- Sax No End (SABA, 1967)
- Out of the Folk Bag (Columbia, 1967)
- 17 Men and Their Music (Campi, 1967)
- All Smiles (MPS, 1968)
- Faces (MPS, 1968)
- Latin Kaleidoscope (MPS, 1968)
- Fellini 712 (MPS, 1969)
- All Blues (MPS, 1969)
- More Smiles (MPS, 1969)
- Clarke Boland Big Band en Concert avec Europe 1 (Tréma, 1969 [1992])
- Off Limits (Polydor, 1970)
- November Girl (Black Lion, 1970 [1975]) with Carmen McRae

With Dizzy Gillespie:

- Dizzy Digs Paris (Giant Steps, 1953 [2006])
