= Joe Harris (musician) =

American jazz musician (1926–2016)

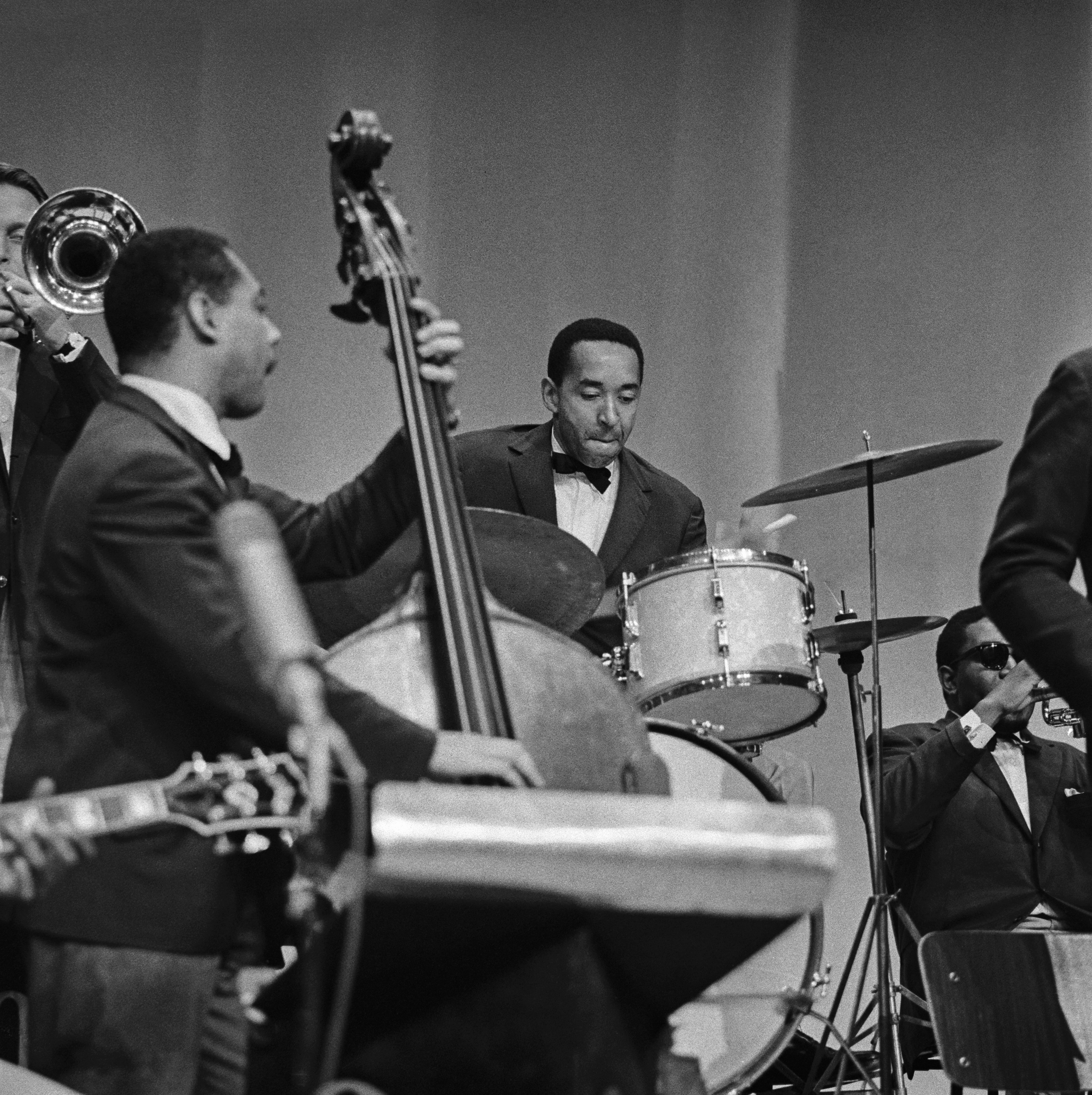
- Harris with the Quincy Jones Band in 1960

Background information
- Born: Joseph Allison Harris; 23 December 1926; Pittsburgh
- Died: January 27, 2016 (aged 89)
- Genres: Jazz; bebop
- Occupation: Musician
- Instruments: Drums; timpani

Joseph Allison Harris (1926–2016) was a big band and bebop jazz drummer.

Born in Pittsburgh, on 23 December 1926, he moved to New York City in 1946 and played in the house band at the Apollo Theater before going on to play with Dizzy Gillespie.

In January 1949, he stepped in for Max Roach, who was rehearsing with Miles Davis on some of the Charlie Parker recordings at the Royal Roost.

Having moved to Sweden in 1956, Harris stepped in for Pete La Roca in Sonny Rollins's trio for some dates in Stockholm, and worked with Rolf Ericson.

In 1960, Harris joined Quincy Jones's big band that included Clark Terry, Les Spann, Melba Liston, Buddy Catlett, Åke Persson, Sahib Shihab, Phil Woods, and Budd Johnson for the Free and Easy tour of Europe.

He then went to live in Germany, where he played timpani for the Kenny Clarke/Francy Boland Big Band from 1961 to 1966.

Harris died on 27 January 2016.
