= Erich Kleinschuster =

Austrian trombonist and bandleader (1930–2018)

Erich Kleinschuster (23 January 1930 – 12 September 2018) was an Austrian trombonist and bandleader.

== Biography ==
Kleinschuster was born in Graz, and learned to play piano before learning how to play the trombone; his first major engagement was as a member of Fridl Althaler's Radio Graz dance orchestra. As a member of the International Youth Band, he appeared at the 1958 Newport Jazz Festival, and worked with Johannes Fehring from 1958 to 1965, in addition to playing with Kenny Clarke and Francy Boland's ensemble. He played with Friedrich Gulda in 1965, then put together a six-piece ensemble the following year, which performed frequently on Österreichischer Rundfunk. He founded Vienna's Jazzinstitut in 1968 and was the leader of Österreichischer Rundfunk's big band from 1972 until 1981; he was the conductor for the Austrian entries of the Eurovision Song Contest in 1972 and 1976. Among his jazz associations in the 1970s were Stan Getz, Astrud Gilberto, George Gruntz, Peter Herbolzheimer, Gerry Mulligan, and Toots Thielemans.

In 1981 he moved back to Graz and became a lecturer in music at the Hochschule für Musik und Darstellende Kunst, a position he held until 1998; he also put together a youth orchestra, JAM, which toured in the early 1990s.
