= SABA (electronics manufacturer) =

German consumer electronics company

- Founded: 1835; 191 years ago in Villingen-Schwenningen
- Fate: shut down in 2008
- Headquarters: Triberg Villingen Paris, France
- Products: Televisions, home security, home appliances
- Parent: Technicolor

SABA (Schwarzwälder Apparate-Bau-Anstalt lit. "Black Forest Apparatus Construction Institution") was a German electronics company founded in Villingen. The company was founded in 1923 at Triberg im Schwarzwald (Black Forest), present-day Baden-Württemberg. SABA started as a clock-making company, then became a radio manufacturer, and a few years later a record label. In 1968, SABA sold the majority of the company to GTE, an American telephone company. In 1980, the company was purchased by Thomson SA and integrated as a separate business unit.

== History ==
=== Founding era ===
SABA began as a clock-maker in Triberg (Black Forest), founded in 1835 by Joseph Benedikt Schwer. Schwer manufactured clocks. In 1864/65, his son August joined the company, which from then on operated under the name "August Schwer Söhne Metallwaren-Fabrik". In 1905, Hermann Schwer, the founder's grandson took over the factory, which by then had 20 employees. The production of razors, doorbells, and bicycle bells was added to the operations. In 1918 it moved to Villingen. Herman Schwer started the manufacturing of headphones, radio parts, and a variety of products from radio components to receivers in 1923. In 1929, SABA hired the Swiss engineer Eugen Leuthold. With the S-35, he developed a radio device that sold more than 100,000 units by the end of the year. It introduced for the first time on the market dynamic loudspeakers which soon became a bestseller. The company developed the first radio receiver with search and automatic fine tuning in all bandwidths.

== Nazi era ==
SABA benefited from contracts with the Nazis. In 1939, with the outbreak of the war, SABA expanded its operations on behalf of the Wehrmacht.

In the years that followed, wartime production accounted for 88% of the company's total output. SABA manufactured radio equipment, FM transceiver for tanks as well as field telephones, measuring instruments, and more. During the WW II, so-called female "foreign workers" accounted for around one-fifth of the entire SABA workforce. Furthermore, the prisoner-of-war camp STALAG V B was located in the immediate vicinity of the SABA factory premises.

SABA actively leveraged its support for the NSDAP as a marketing tool. In advertisements from the 1930s, the company included extensive quotes from speeches by Propaganda Minister Joseph Goebbels, aiming to highlight its own significance to the state-sponsored broadcasting system. SABA was among the companies that manufactured and distributed the "Volksempfänger" (People's Receiver) VE 301, GW and Dyn W propaganda tools in the form of a low-quality radios.

Towards the end of the war, the SABA site became a target for Allied air raids due to its significance as an armaments facility. During a heavy bombing raid on April 19, 1945, large portions of the production plants, which had only recently been constructed were destroyed, and five people died. Following the arrival of French troops, the facilities were dismantled; however, by the end of 1945, the company managed to regain its footing by beginning the manufacture of telephone sets for the postal service.

== Post World War II ==
There was no active examination of the company’s role as a supporter of the Nazis, nor are there any sources available regarding this. Post-War SABA in the new West Germany was not familiar to a very different market: radio was increasingly being challenged in the home by television, consumer culture was becoming more sophisticated and with it more competitive, the influence of America on popular culture in Europe was increasing and becoming increasingly dominant. Consumers' demands and expectations were very different from those of the 1930s.

In 1951, IFA, a consumer industry electronics show in Berlin allowed SABA to show their first TV receiver. In 1956, the company built a plant in Friedrichshafen. SABA successes enabled the company to manufacture tape recorders. It introduced the large TV screen projector 'Telerama' on the market, and it launched the first color TV with wireless remote control.

=== Purchase ===
In 1968, the American Company GTE purchased 85% of SABA with the aim of achieving the greatest possible synergy with its own Sylvania brand. SABA built the first hi-fi audio set with wireless remote control and introduced a failure diagnosis system. SABA launched first modularized color TV built only of pluggable sub-assembly boards. In 1973, SABA was at this period a serious competitor in Germany to the leading Telefunken and Grundig brands. In 1976, SABA became a subsidiary of the American company GTE.

=== Thomson era ===
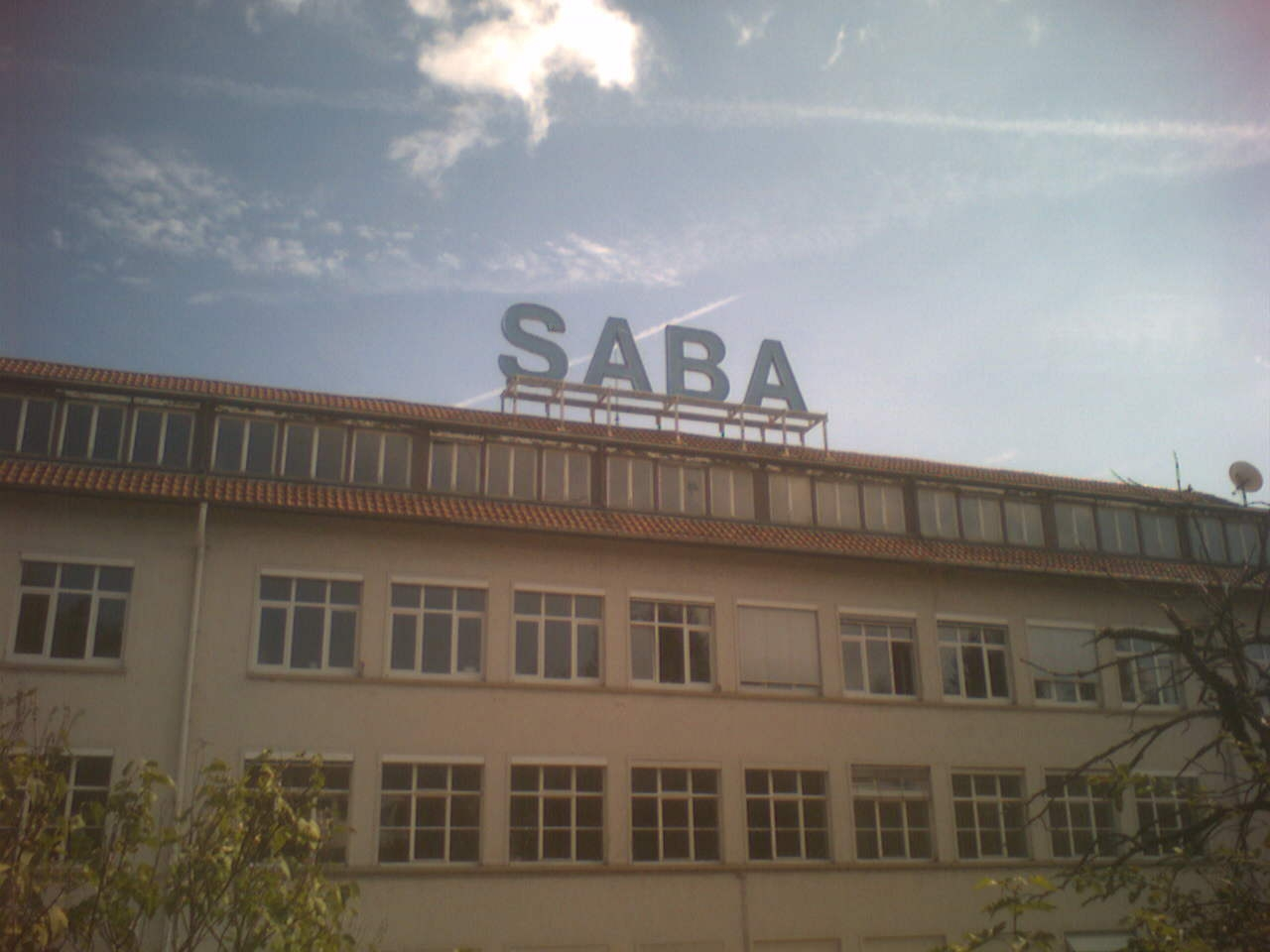
Former SABA home in Villingen in 2007

In 1980, GTE left consumer electronic distribution. Thomson-Brandt, a consumer electronics group with headquarters in Paris, took over 100% of SABA-Werke GmbH (Villingen). After Thomson also acquires Telefunken, all SABA devices are produced exclusively at that company’s facilities. From then on, SABA exists solely as a sales company and brand.

In 1986, a new environment emerged for the international trade in licenses and patents. The company’s name changed frequently: SEWEK, DEWEK, EWD, TTG, DTB, and finally TTE. TTE had only the development department remaining in Villingen-Schwenningen. In 1988, Hermann Brunner-Schwer, the former head of SABA-Werke, passed away; in 2004, Hans Georg Brunner-Schwer, head of MPS Records, died in an accident.

SABA launched several products designed by Philippe Starck, the director of consumer electronics at Thomson. These included: "Jim Nature" (1994), a portable TV set made of recycled high-density wood, now exhibited in the Museum of Modern Art (MoMA) in New York City, and "Oye-Oye", a small radio with an innovative form factor.

With the insolvency of TTE Germany, the Chinese-French joint venture between TCL and Thomson, many jobs in television development at the Villingen-Schwenningen site were lost once again in 2008.

The current holder of the trademark rights to the name "SABA" has no connection to the German or French company.

== Record label ==
Saba had a record label founded by Hans Georg Brunner-Schwer, grandson of the electronics company's founder, to produce music for automobile tape players. In 1967 Saba's catalogue included Oscar Peterson, Nathan Davis, and the Clarke-Boland Big Band. Saba bought distribution rights from Prestige Records. Saba's parent company was bought by an American company that discontinued the recording operation. Brunner-Schwer then established MPS Records.
