= Karl Drewo =

Austrian saxophonist

Karl Drewo (also spelled Carl Drevo) (May 17, 1929, Vienna - May 10, 1995, Wels) was an Austrian jazz saxophonist.

As a child, Drewo studied piano and accordion, but switched to tenor sax in his teens, working in the late 1940s with Charlie Gaudriot and Paul Reischman. He played in the early 1950s with Gert Steffens and Horst Winter, and was a member of the Austrian All Stars in the mid-1950s. From 1956 to 1958 he worked with Fatty George, then became a member of Kurt Edelhagen's orchestra, where he played into the early 1970s. In the 1960s he recorded with Francy Boland, Kenny Clarke, Zoot Sims, and Jimmy Woode, among others.

After leaving Edelhagen's group, he played with the Österreichischer Rundfunk band, and in the 1980s was a member of Peter Herbolzheimer's ensemble. Later that decade he took a position as a lecturer at an arts school in Graz. In the 1990s he played with the Lungau Big Band, Rudolf Josel, and Rudi Wilfer.
