= Benny Bailey =

American jazz trumpeter (1925–2005)

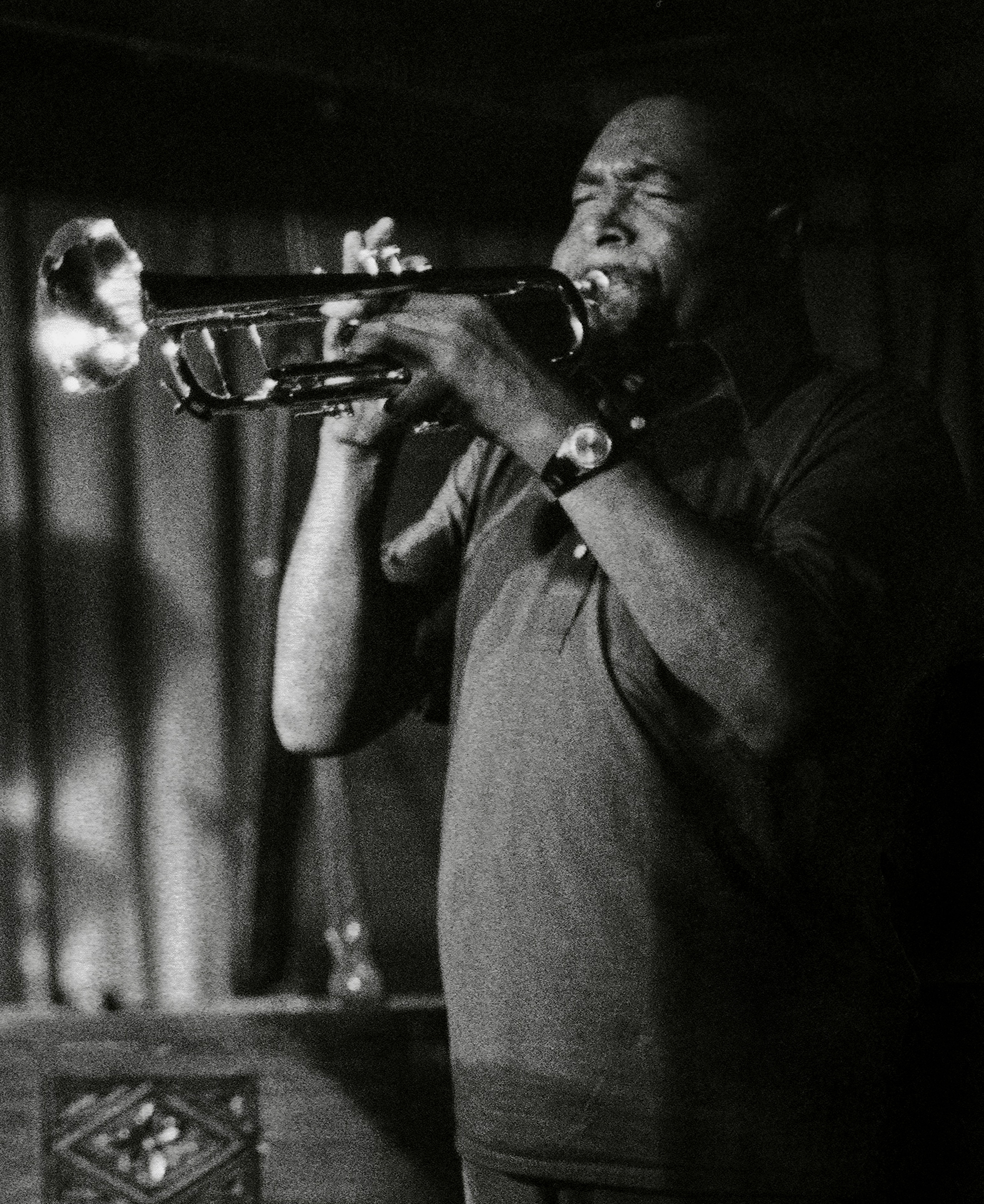
- Bailey at the Village Vanguard, June 1977

Background information
- Born: Ernest Harold Bailey; August 13, 1925; Cleveland, Ohio, U.S.
- Died: April 14, 2005 (aged 79) Amsterdam, Netherlands
- Genres: Jazz
- Occupation: Musician
- Instrument: Trumpet
- Years active: 1940s–2000s
- Formerly of: The Kenny Clarke-Francy Boland Big Band

Ernest Harold "Benny" Bailey (August 13, 1925 – April 14, 2005) was an American jazz trumpeter.

== Biography ==
A native of Cleveland, Ohio, Bailey briefly studied flute and piano before turning to trumpet. He attended the Cleveland Conservatory of Music. He was influenced by Cleveland native Tadd Dameron and had a significant influence on other Cleveland musicians, such as Albert Ayler, Bob Cunningham, Bobby Few, Bill Hardman, and Frank Wright. Bailey played with Tony Lovano, father of Joe Lovano.

In the early 1940s he worked with Bull Moose Jackson and Scatman Crothers. He later worked with Dizzy Gillespie and toured with Lionel Hampton. During a European tour with Hampton he remained in Europe and spent time in Sweden, where he worked with Harry Arnold's big band. He preferred big bands over small groups, and he became associated with several big bands in Europe, including the Kenny Clarke/Francy Boland Big Band. His time with Quincy Jones led to a brief return to the United States in 1960. He was invited to the studio as part of Freddie Redd's sextet to record Redd's Blues after meeting the pianist during a tour in Sweden, and played at the 1960 Newport Jazz Festival. He returned to Europe, first to Germany, then the Netherlands, where he settled permanently.

In 1969 he played on Eddie Harris and Les McCann's album Swiss Movement, recorded live at the Montreux Jazz Festival, although it was not his usual style of music. In 1988 he worked with British clarinetist Tony Coe and recorded albums until 2000 when he was in his mid-70s.

Bailey died at home in Amsterdam on April 14, 2005.

== Discography ==
=== As leader ===
- Quincy - Here We Come (Metronome, 1959) also released as The Music of Quincy Jones by Argo in 1961
- Big Brass (Candid, 1960)
- Soul Eyes (MPS 1968)
- Folklore in Swing (MPS, 1966)
- The Balkan in My Soul (MPS, 1968)
- Soul Eyes: Jazz Live at the Domicile Munich (MPS 1968)
- Mirrors (The Amazing Benny Bailey) (Freedom 1971)
- Islands (Enja 1976)
- Serenade to a Planet (Ego, 1976)
- East of Isar with Sal Nistico (Ego, 1978)
- Grand Slam (Jazzcraft, 1978)
- While My Lady Sleeps (Gemini, 1990)
- No Refill (TCB, 1994)
- Angel Eyes (Laika, 1995)
- Peruvian Nights (TCB, 1996)
- I Thought About You (Laika, 1996)
- The Satchmo Legacy (Enja, 2000)

=== As sideman ===
With Count Basie

- Basie in Sweden (Roulette, 1962)

With Berlin Contemporary Jazz Orchestra

- Berlin Contemporary Jazz Orchestra (ECM, 1990)

With the Kenny Clarke/Francy Boland Big Band

- Jazz Is Universal (Atlantic, 1962)
- Handle with Care (Atlantic, 1963)
- Now Hear Our Meanin' (Columbia, 1965 [1963])
- Swing, Waltz, Swing (Philips, 1966)
- Sax No End (SABA, 1967)
- Out of the Folk Bag (Columbia, 1967)
- 17 Men and Their Music (Campi, 1967)
- All Smiles (MPS, 1968)
- Faces (MPS, 1969)
- Latin Kaleidoscope (MPS, 1969)
- Fellini 712 (MPS, 1969)
- All Blues (MPS, 1969)
- More Smiles (MPS, 1969)
- Clarke Boland Big Band en Concert avec Europe 1 (Tréma, 1992 [1969])
- Off Limits (Polydor, 1970)
- November Girl with Carmen McRae (Black Lion, 1975 [1970])
- Change of Scenes with Stan Getz (Verve, 1971)

With Jazz Artists Guild

- Newport Rebels (Candid, 1961)

With Eric Dolphy

- The Berlin Concerts (enja, 1961)

With Stan Getz

- Imported from Europe (Verve, 1958)

With Benny Golson

- Stockholm Sojourn (Prestige, 1964)

With Dexter Gordon

- Sophisticated Giant (Columbia, 1977)
- Revelation (SteepleChase, 1995 [1974])
- The Rainbow People (Steeplechase, 2002 [1974])
- Round Midnight (SteepleChase, 1991 [1974])

With Quincy Jones

- Quincy's Home Again (Metronome, 1958) - also released as Harry Arnold + Big Band + Quincy Jones = Jazz! (EmArcy)
- I Dig Dancers (Mercury, 1960)
- Quincy Plays for Pussycats (Mercury, 1965) – recorded in 1959-65
- Miles & Quincy Live at Montreux (Warner Bros., 1993) also with Miles Davis – recorded in 1991

With Billy Mitchell

- De Lawd's Blues (Xanadu, 1980)

With Les McCann & Eddie Harris

- Swiss Movement (Atlantic, 1969)

With Freddie Redd

- Redd's Blues (Blue Note, 1961)

With Charlie Rouse

- The Upper Manhattan Jazz Society (Enja, 1985 [1981])

With Sahib Shihab

- Companionship (Vogue Schallplatten, 1971 [1964-70])

With Randy Weston

- Uhuru Afrika (Roulette, 1960)

With Jimmy Witherspoon

- Some of My Best Friends Are the Blues (Prestige, 1964)

With Phil Woods

- Rights of Swing (Candid, 1961)

== See also ==
- Vocalese, an album by Manhattan Transfer with a tribute song entitled "Meet Benny Bailey"
