= Åke Persson =

Swedish jazz trombonist

Åke Persson (February 25, 1932 – February 5, 1975) was a Swedish bebop jazz trombonist.

== Biography ==
Persson was born in Hässleholm, southern Sweden and started his music career by playing valve trumpet in school.

Persson, known as "the Comet" (or "Kometen"), moved to Stockholm in 1951, where he played in Simon Brehm's quintet (1951–1954). Following this Persson worked with Arne Domnérus, Hacke Björksten, Harry Arnold's Radio Band (1956–1961), Quincy Jones, Lars Gullin, the RIAS Berlin band (1961–1975), and the Kenny Clarke-Francy Boland Big Band (1963–1971). Persson played with many American musicians, including George Wallington, Roy Haynes, Benny Bailey, Count Basie, Duke Ellington, and Dizzy Gillespie. He led several sessions for labels such as Metronome, Philips, and EmArcy in the 1950s.

Persson drowned in the Djurgården canal in central Stockholm in February 1975; he had driven his car into the canal either accidentally or deliberately. There is a book trombonist Åke Persson written by author Bo Carlsson.

== Discography ==
With Benny Bailey

- Quincy - Here We Come (Metronome, 1959) - also released as The Music of Quincy Jones (Argo)

With Count Basie

- Basie in Sweden (Roulette, 1962)

With the Kenny Clarke/Francy Boland Big Band

- Jazz Is Universal (Atlantic, 1962)
- Handle with Care (Atlantic, 1963)
- Now Hear Our Meanin' (Columbia, 1963 [1965])
- Swing, Waltz, Swing (Philips, 1966)
- Sax No End (SABA, 1967)
- 17 Men and Their Music (Campi, 1967)
- All Smiles (MPS, 1968)
- Faces (MPS, 1968)
- Latin Kaleidoscope (MPS, 1968)
- Fellini 712 (MPS, 1969)
- All Blues (MPS, 1969)
- More Smiles (MPS, 1969)
- Clarke Boland Big Band en Concert avec Europe 1 (Tréma, 1969 [1992])
- Off Limits (Polydor, 1970)
- November Girl (Black Lion, 1970 [1975]) – with Carmen McRae
- Change of Scenes (Verve, 1971) – with Stan Getz

With Duke Ellington

- Live at the Opernhaus Cologne 1969 (Delta Music, 2016)

With Stan Getz

- Imported from Europe (Verve, 1958)

With Benny Golson

- Stockholm Sojourn (Prestige, 1974)

With Quincy Jones

- Jazz Abroad (Emarcy, 1955) also with Roy Haynes
- Quincy's Home Again (Metronome, 1958) - also released as Harry Arnold + Big Band + Quincy Jones = Jazz! (EmArcy)
- I Dig Dancers (Mercury, 1960)

With Herbie Mann

- Mann in the Morning (Prestige, 1956 [1958])

With Mark Murphy

- Midnight Mood (MPS, 1968)

With Oliver Nelson

- Berlin Dialogue for Orchestra (Flying Dutchman, 1970)

With Sahib Shihab

- Summer Dawn (Argo, 1964)
- Companionship (Vogue Schallplatten, 1964-70 [1971])

With Jimmy Witherspoon

- Some of My Best Friends Are the Blues (Prestige, 1964)

== Bibliography ==
- Carlsson, Bo (2015). Åke Persson: 1932-1975 : en biografi & diskografi. Hässleholm: Bo Carlsson. Libris 19349612. ISBN 9789163799952
