= Kenny Clarke/Francy Boland Big Band =

American jazz big band

- Origin: Paris, France
- Genres: Jazz
- Years active: 1960–1980
- Labels: Atlantic, MPS

The Kenny Clarke/Francy Boland Big Band was a jazz big band co-led by American drummer Kenny Clarke and Belgian pianist François "Francy" Boland. They were one of the most noteworthy jazz big bands formed outside the United States, featuring top European musicians alongside expatriate and touring Americans.

== History ==
American drummer Kenny Clarke and Belgian pianist Francy Boland started the band in Paris in 1960. A sextet became an octet before expanding into a big band that combined European musicians with American jazz expatriates. The debut album, Jazz Is Universal, was released in 1962.

The band collaborated with Stan Getz, Zoot Sims, Derek Watkins, and Phil Woods.

== Personnel ==
- Benny Bailey
- Francy Boland
- Kenny Clare
- Kenny Clarke
- Tony Coe
- Eddie "Lockjaw" Davis
- Jimmy Deuchar
- Carl Drevo
- Muvaffak "Maffy" Falay
- Art Farmer
- Tony Fisher
- Herb Geller
- Dusko Goykovich
- Johnny Griffin
- Tootie Heath
- Derek Humble
- Tony Inzalaco
- Shake Keane
- Rick Keefer
- Erik van Lier
- Albert Mangelsdorff
- Sabu Martinez
- Ron Mathewson
- Milo Pavlovic
- Nat Peck
- Åke Persson
- Ack van Rooyen
- Fats Sadi
- Manfred Schoof
- Ronnie Scott
- Sahib Shihab
- Idrees Sulieman
- Stan Sulzmann
- John Surman
- Jean Warland
- Derek Watkins
- Kenny Wheeler
- Jimmy Woode

== Discography ==
- The Golden 8 (Blue Note, 1961)
- Jazz Is Universal (Atlantic, 1962)
- Handle with Care (Atlantic, 1963)
- Now Hear Our Meanin' (Columbia, 1965)
- Swing, Waltz, Swing (Philips, 1966)
- Out of the Folk Bag (Columbia, 1967)
- Music for the Small Hours (Columbia, 1967)
- Sax No End (SABA, 1967)
- 17 Men and Their Music (Campi, 1967)
- Jazz Convention Volume 1 (KPM Music, 1968)
- Jazz Convention Volume II (KPM Music, 1968)
- Jazz Convention Volume III (KPM Music, 1968)
- My Kind Of World with Gitte (Electrola, 1969)
- Live at Ronnie’s Album 1: Volcano (Rearward/Schema, 1969)
- Live at Ronnie’s Album 2: Rue Chaptal (Rearward/Schema, 1969)
- All Blues (MPS, 1969)
- All Smiles (MPS, 1969)
- More Smiles (MPS, 1969)
- Latin Kaleidoscope (MPS, 1969)
- More (Campi, 1969)
- Faces (MPS, 1969)
- Fellini 712 (MPS, 1969)
- At Her Majesty’s Pleasure (Black Lion, 1969)
- Off Limits (Polydor, 1971)
- Change of Scenes with Stan Getz (Verve, 1971)
- The Second Greatest Jazz Big Band in the World (Black Lion, 1971)
- November Girl with Carmen McRae (Black Lion, 1975)
- Open Door (Muse Records, 1975)
- Clarke Boland Big Band en Concert avec Europe 1 (Tréma, 1992)

=== Video ===
- Live in Prague 1967 (DVD) ( mpro Jazz, 2008)
