= Kurt Edelhagen =

German big band leader (1920–1982)

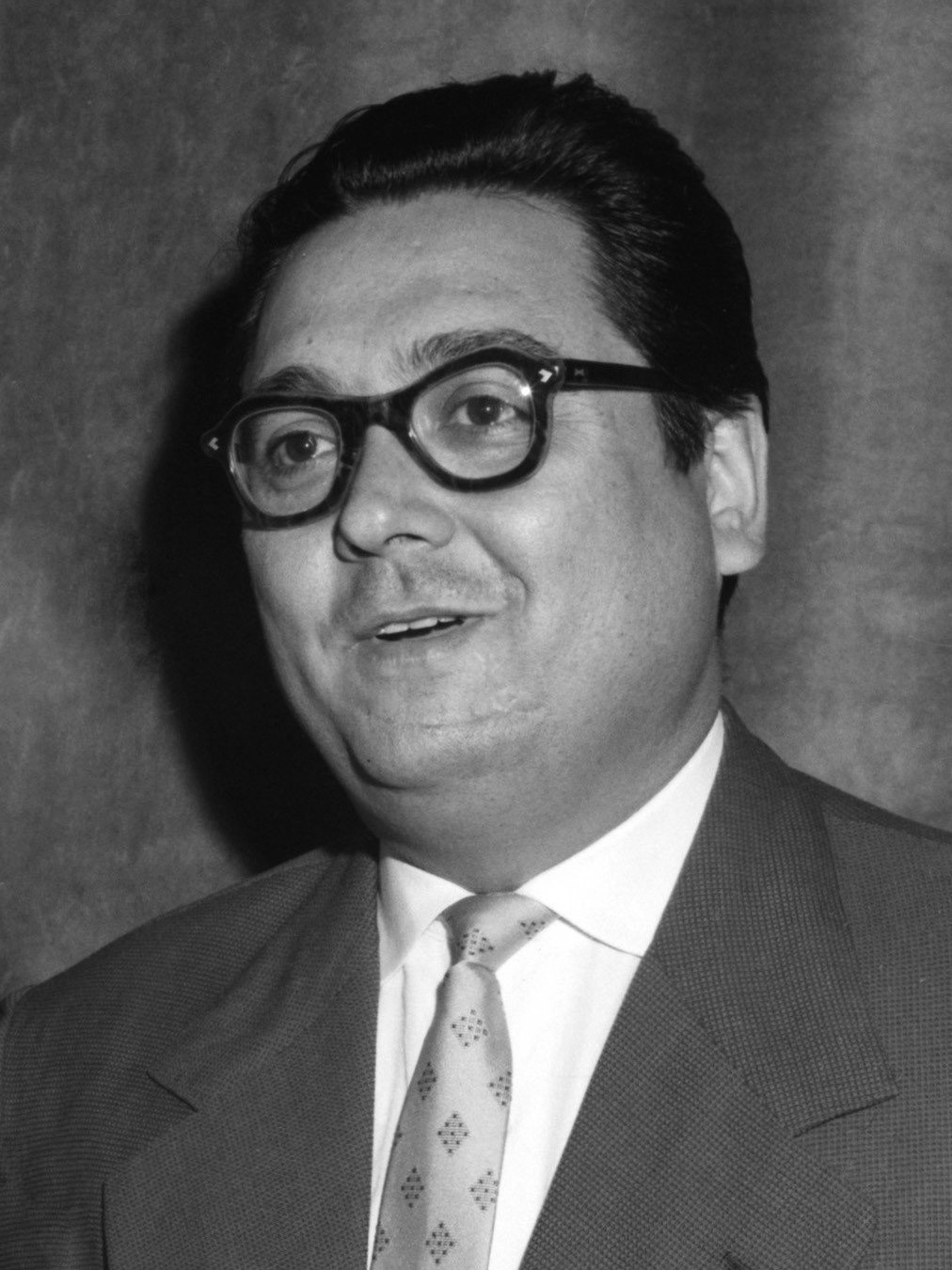
- Kurt Edelhagen in Scheveningen (June 1958)
- Born: 5 June 1920; Herne, North Rhine-Westphalia, Germany
- Died: 8 February 1982 (aged 61); Cologne, Germany
- Occupation: Composer
- Years active: 1945–1982

Kurt Edelhagen (German: [kʊʁt ˈeːdl̩ˌhaːɡn̩]; born 5 June 1920 – 8 February 1982) was a German big band leader.

== Biography ==
Edelhagen was born in Herne, North Rhine-Westphalia, Germany. Edelhagen studied conducting and piano in Essen.

In 1945, he started a trio, then a big band a year later. He performed on the radio station in Frankfurt am Main, then for three years beginning in 1949 led the Bayerischer Rundfunk in Nuremberg. From 1952 to 1957 he led the Südwestfunk big band. In 1954, he participated in the Concerto for jazz band and orchestra by Rolf Libermann. The next year he moved to Cologne, and in 1957 took the leading position in the radio station Westdeutscher Rundfunk (WDR) big band, which included Dusko Goykovich and Jiggs Whigham. The band toured East Germany, USSR, Czechoslovakia, and several Arab countries during the 1960s. By 1974, Edelhagen stopped producing for WDR.

In 1958, Hochschule für Musik und Tanz Köln introduced the university's first jazz seminars, taught by Edelhagen. Among his students were Manfred Schoof and Jaki Liebezeit.

His radio orchestra played at the opening ceremony of the 1972 Munich Olympics.

Edelhagen died in February 1982 in Cologne, at the age of 61.

== Interest ==
Kurt Edelhagen's work "Hut Ab, Charly" was the theme music of Hungarian Television's police program "Blue Light" for decades.
