= MPS Records =

German record label

- Parent company: Edel AG
- Founded: 1968
- Founder: Hans Georg Brunner-Schwer
- Distributors: BASF, Metronome Music
- Genre: Jazz
- Country of origin: Germany
- Location: Villingen-Schwenningen

MPS Records is a German jazz record company and label founded in 1968 by Hans Georg Brunner-Schwer. MPS stands for "Musik Produktion Schwarzwald" (Music Production Black Forest).

== History ==
Originally based in Villingen, MPS was founded as the successor to the SABA record label by Hans Georg Brunner-Schwer, Joachim-Ernst Berendt, Willy Fruth, and Achim Hebgen (who also worked as producers). Founded in 1968, MPS was the first German label to exclusively release jazz recordings. MPS produced and released albums by American, Canadian, European and Japanese jazz artists. Recordings of the JazzFest Berlin, the Donaueschingen Festival and the New Jazz Meeting Baden-Baden were also issued. Besides its own productions, MPS also licensed and distributed recordings from other companies.

Performers under contract to MPS included Oscar Peterson, Hans Koller, Horst Jankowski, George Duke, Erwin Lehn, Volker Kriegel, Albert Mangelsdorff, the Singers Unlimited, Wolfgang Dauner, the Kenny Clarke/Francy Boland Big Band, Jean-Luc Ponty, Lee Konitz, Charlie Mariano, Alphonse Mouzon, Monty Alexander, Dave Pike and Art Van Damme. There is a wide stylistic spectrum, from swing to free jazz, jazz rock and precursors of ethno jazz.

The hallmarks of MPS releases were the high quality of the recordings (some of the production was undertaken in the private atmosphere of label founder Brunner-Schwer's living room), the attractive design of the sleeves, and the detail of information about artists, instruments and performances. Some of these recordings have been re-released on CD.

The label was distributed by BASF from 1971, then by Metronome Music GmbH Hamburg from 1974. In 1983, Brunner-Schwer sold the rights to Philips, which then transferred it to Polydor. In 1993, Polydor subsidiary Motor Music began to release individual recordings on CD. In 1999, Universal Music Group began re-releases. Since 2000, Speakers Corner Records have released vinyl reissues of individual MPS albums with their original artwork.

Universal spun the label off in 2012, with Edel AG acquiring MPS in January 2014.
