= Francy Boland =

Belgian jazz composer and pianist (1929–2005)

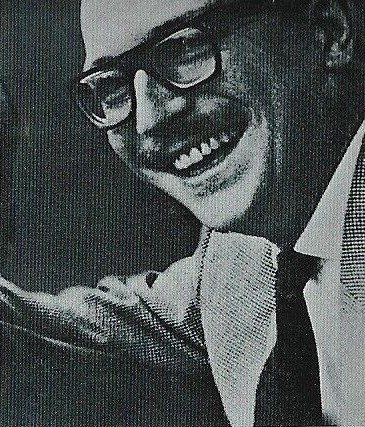
- Boland in 1961
- Born: François Boland; 6 November 1929; Namur, Belgium
- Died: 12 August 2005 (aged 75); Geneva, Switzerland

François Boland (6 November 1929 – 12 August 2005) was a classically trained Belgian jazz composer and pianist.

He first gained notice in 1949 and worked with Belgian jazz greats like Bobby Jaspar, and in 1955 he joined Chet Baker's quintet. Moving to the US, he began arranging for Count Basie, Benny Goodman, Woody Herman and Dizzy Gillespie, and set up an octet with drummer Kenny Clarke before returning to Europe and becoming Kurt Edelhagen's chief arranger. In 1961, building from a rhythm section featuring Clarke, Jimmy Woode and himself, he founded The Kenny Clarke-Francy Boland Big Band, which rapidly became one of the most noted Big Bands assembled outside the United States. After it broke up in 1972 he concentrated on composing.

He lived in Europe, primarily Switzerland, from 1976 and did musical arrangements for Sarah Vaughan among others. He was also part of One World, One Peace, an effort involving Pope John Paul II. He died in 2005.

Francy Boland's song "Just Give Me Time" was covered by Carola in 1966, first released on her album Carola & Heikki Sarmanto Trio, reaching the Finnish Charts in 2004.

== Discography ==
- Out of the Background (SABA, 1967)
- Flirt and Dream (SABA, 1967)

With Johnny Griffin

- Night Lady (Philips, 1964)
- Tough Tenors Again 'n' Again (MPS, 1970) – with Eddie "Lockjaw" Davis

Kenny Clarke / Francy Boland Big Band (1962-1971)

- see the discography section of The Kenny Clarke-Francy Boland Big Band

With Mark Murphy

- Midnight Mood (MPS, 1968)

With Sahib Shihab

- Summer Dawn (Argo, 1964)
- Seeds (Vogue Schallplatten, 1968)
- Companionship (Vogue Schallplatten, 1964-70 [1971])
