= The Teddy Charles Tentet =

Studio album by Teddy Charles
- Released: 1956
- Recorded: January 6, 1956
- Genre: Jazz
- Length: 67:24
- Label: Atlantic Records
- Producer: Nesuhi Ertegun

Teddy Charles chronology
Evolution (1953-55)	The Teddy Charles Tentet (1956)	Vibe-Rant (1957)

The Teddy Charles Tentet is a 1956 jazz album featuring a tentet led by multi-instrumentalist Teddy Charles. Critically well received, the album is listed as one of the "Core Collection" albums in The Penguin Guide to Jazz and an essential recording in 2000's The Essential Jazz Records: Modernism to Postmodernism. Released originally in high fidelity vinyl by Atlantic, the album has been reissued on CD and LP multiple times since 2001.

== Recording history ==
The original album included music recorded at three different sessions. The first, on January 6, 1956, in New York City produced "Quiet Time" and "Nature Boy". The tentet reassembled five days later to record "Green Blues" and "You Go To My Head." On January 17, Sol Schlinger filled in on baritone saxophone for George Barrow to help record "Vibrations", "The Emperor", and "Lydian M-1". The additional tracks standard on CD releases of the album were recorded in New York on October 23, 1956, with a substantially different line up.

== Critical reception ==
Professional ratings
Review scores
Source	Rating
Allmusic	4.5/5 stars
Billboard	Positive
The Penguin Guide to Jazz Recordings	4/4 stars

The album has been critically well received. Writing at the time of release, Billboard declared the "provocative, far-out material" a "must" for modernists, a "real tour-de-force" of "advanced, experimental" jazz chamber music. Contemporary reviewer Scott Yanow, writing for AllMusic described the arrangements of the music as advanced, but noted that they "often leave room for some swinging spots." Speaking of CD re-releases with extra tracks, he concluded, "this CD is pretty definitive of Teddy Charles' more adventurous music of the 1950s and it grows in interest with each listening."The Penguin Guide to Jazz has listed the album as one of its "Core Collection" for fans of jazz music, and it is included in 2000's The Essential Jazz Records: Modernism to Postmodernism. According to the latter book, the recording—which "sought to expand the basic vocabulary of bop through sound musical principles and practice"—has helped secure Charles a permanent place as an influential figure in jazz.

== Legacy ==
Writing in The Essential Jazz Records: Modernism to Postmodernism, Stuart Nicholson suggests that several compositions on the album offer early examples of evolutionary jazz techniques. "Lydian M-1" is singled out by 2000's The Essential Jazz Records: Modernism to Postmodernism for its experimentation with modes (scale patterns other than major and minor), two years before the release of Miles Davis's Milestones, often cited as a pioneer of the form. According to Nicholson, "The Emperor" offers two episodes of free jazz several years before free jazz innovator Ornette Coleman would make himself heard in the jazz music scene. Nicholson does not suggest that Charles innovated these, but rather offer them as examples of Charles' role in "a small group of New York-based musicians who were exploring ways of extending the music's boundaries" and whose "significance in anticipating changes in jazz, sometimes years in advance, have come to be overlooked."

== Track listing ==
1. "Vibrations" (Mal Waldron) — 6:14
2. "The Quiet Time" (Jimmy Giuffre) — 5:48
3. "The Emperor" (Teddy Charles) — 8:08
4. "Nature Boy" (eden ahbez) — 6:22
5. "Green Blues" (Teddy Charles) — 4:07
6. "You Go to My Head" (J. Fred Coots, Haven Gillespie) — 4:27
7. "Lydian M-1" (George Russell) — 4:26

=== Additional tracks on CD re-release ===
These additional tracks may not be available on all CD re-releases.

1. "Word from Bird" (Teddy Charles) — 10:06
2. "Show Time" (Bob Brookmeyer) — 6:04
3. "Blue Greens" (Teddy Charles) — 11:42

== Personnel ==
For January 1956 recording dates (tracks 1–7).

- Art Farmer (trumpet, credited as Peter Urban)
- Don Butterfield (tuba)
- Gigi Gryce (alto saxophone)
- J.R. Monterose (tenor saxophone)
- George Barrow (baritone saxophone on tracks 2, 4, 5, and 6)
- Sol Schlinger (baritone saxophone on tracks 1, 3, and 7)
- Teddy Charles (vibraphone)
- Mal Waldron (piano)
- Jimmy Raney (guitar)
- Teddy Kotick (bass)
- Joe Harris (drums)

For tracks 8 and 9, recorded October 23, 1956.

- Art Farmer (trumpet)
- Eddie Bert (trombone on track 8)
- Jim Buffington (French horn on track 8)
- Don Butterfield (tuba)
- Hal Stein (alto saxophone)
- Bob Newman (tenor saxophone)
- George Barrow (baritone saxophone)
- Teddy Charles (vibraphone)
- Hall Overton (piano)
- Jimmy Raney (guitar)
- Addison Farmer (bass)
- Ed Shaughnessy (drums)

For track 10, recorded November 12, 1956

- Teddy Charles (vibraphone)
- Hall Overton (piano)
- Charles Mingus (bass)
- Ed Shaughnessy (drums)

== Release history ==
Publisher	Year	Catalog/Format
Atlantic	1956	Atlantic 1229 (LP)
Collectables Records	2001	COL-6161 (CD)
Rhino Records	2005	(CD)
WEA	2007	(CD)
Disconforme/ Jazzbeat	2008	(LP)
Disconforme/Jazzbeat	2009	(CD)
