= Teddy Kotick =

American jazz musician (1928–1986)

Theodore John Kotick (June 4, 1928 – April 17, 1986) was an American jazz double bassist. Kotick never recorded as a leader, but he appeared as a sideman with many leading jazz musicians, including Charlie Parker, Buddy Rich, Artie Shaw, Horace Silver, Phil Woods, and Bill Evans. He was born in Haverhill, Massachusetts, and died of a brain tumor in 1986, aged 57.

== Discography ==
With Teddy Charles

- Teddy Charles Featuring Bobby Brookmeyer (Prestige, 1954)
- The Teddy Charles Tentet (Atlantic, 1956)
- Russia Goes Jazz (United Artists, 1964)

With Bill Evans

- New Jazz Conceptions (Riverside, 1957)
- The Secret Sessions (Recorded at the Village Vanguard 1966-1975) (Milestone, 1996) – 1966 gig only

With Tony Fruscella

- Debut (Spotlite, 1981)
- Fru'n Brew (Spotlite, 1981)
- The 1954 Unissued Atlantic Session (Fresh Sound, 2011)

With Charlie Parker

- Charlie Parker Plays Cole Porter (Verve, 1957)
- Fiesta (Verve, 1957)
- Now's the Time (Verve, 1957)
- Swedish Schnapps (Verve, 1958)
- The Happy Bird (Charlie Parker, 1961)
- Bird with Strings (Columbia, 1977)

With Jimmy Raney

- Jimmy Raney featuring Bob Brookmeyer (ABC-Paramount, 1956)
- The Fourmost Guitars (ABC-Paramount, 1957)
- A (Prestige, 1958)

With Horace Silver

- The Stylings of Silver (Blue Note, 1957)
- Further Explorations (Blue Note, 1958)

With George Wallington

- Jazz for the Carriage Trade (Prestige, 1956)
- Knight Music (Atlantic, 1956)
- The New York Scene (New Jazz, 1957)
- The Prestidigitator (EastWest, 1958)

With Phil Woods

- Encores (Prestige, 1955)
- Woodlore (Prestige, 1956)
- The Young Bloods (Prestige, 1956)
- Phil and Quill with Prestige (Prestige, 1957)
- Bird Feathers (Prestige, 1957)
- Sugan (Status, 1965)

With others

- Buddy Arnold, Wailing (ABC-Paramount, 1956)
- Bob Brookmeyer, The Dual Role of Bob Brookmeyer (Prestige, 1955)
- Kenny Burrell, Earthy (Prestige, 1957)
- Donald Byrd, House of Byrd (Prestige, 1976)
- John Carisi, The New Jazz Sound of Show Boat (Columbia, 1960)
- Al Cohn, Al and Zoot (Coral, 1957)
- Al Cohn, The Al Cohn Quintet Featuring Bobby Brookmeyer (Coral, 1957)
- Eddie Costa, Eddie Costa Quintet (Mode, 1957)
- Bill DeArango, De Arango (EmArcy, 1954)
- Allen Eager, Renaissance (Uptown, 1981)
- Jon Eardley, The Jon Eardley Seven (Prestige, 1956)
- Stan Getz, Interpretations by the Stan Getz Quintet (Norgran, 1954)
- Stan Getz, The Complete Roost Recordings (Blue Note, 1997)
- Urbie Green, The Message (RCA 1986)
- Al Haig, Al Haig Quartet (Period, 1954)
- Roy Haynes, A Life in Time (Dreyfus, 2007)
- Billie Holiday, Gallant Lady (Family, 1973)
- Duke Jordan & Hall Overton, Jazz Laboratory Series (Arista, 1981)
- Jimmy Knepper, A Swinging Introduction to Jimmy Knepper (Bethlehem, 1957)
- Art Mardigan The Jazz School (Wing 1955) – four tracks, album shared with Clark Terry, Paul Gonsalves, Joe Gordon
- Teo Macero, What's New? (Columbia, 1956)
- Helen Merrill, The Artistry of Helen Merrill (Mainstream, 1965)
- J. R. Monterose, Welcome Back J.R.! (Progressive, 1979)
- J. R. Monterose, Live in Albany (Uptown, 1980)
- Herbie Nichols, Herbie Nichols Trio (Blue Note, 1956)
- Herbie Nichols, The Complete Blue Note Recordings (Blue Note, 1997)
- Hod O'Brien, Bits and Pieces (Uptown, 1981)
- Hall Overton, Jazz Laboratory Series Vol. 2 (Signal, 1955)
- George Russell, The Jazz Workshop (RCA Victor, 1957)
- Bobby Scott, Bobby Scott Sings the Best of Lerner and Loewe (LPTime, 2010)
- Tony Scott, Both Sides of Tony Scott (RCA Victor, 1956)
- Martial Solal, At Newport '63 (RCA Victor, 1963)
- Rene Thomas, Guitar Groove (Jazzland, 1960)
- Nick Travis, The Panic Is On (RCA Victor, 1954)
