= The Prestige Jazz Quartet =

Studio album by Teddy Charles
- Released: 1957
- Recorded: June 22 & 28, 1957; Van Gelder Studio, Hackensack, New Jersey
- Genre: Jazz
- Length: 37:37
- Label: Prestige; PRLP 7108
- Producer: Teddy Charles

Teddy Charles chronology
| Three for Duke (1957) | The Prestige Jazz Quartet (1957) | Word from Bird (1958) |

The Prestige Jazz Quartet is an eponymous album by the group nominally by jazz vibraphonist Teddy Charles recorded in 1957 for the Prestige label.

== Reception ==
Professional ratings
Review scores
| Source | Rating |
|---|---|
| Allmusic | 4.5/5 stars |
| The Penguin Guide to Jazz Recordings | 4/4 stars |

The Allmusic review by Thom Jurek stated "This is as fine a jazz record as you are likely to come by from 1957 (and there were many great ones from that year); it's too bad the band didn't remain together longer to explore further the terrain mapped out on this debut".

== Track listing ==
All compositions by Teddy Charles except as indicated

1. "Take Three Parts Jazz" - 14:23
2. "Meta-Waltz" (Mal Waldron) - 5:28
3. "Dear Elaine" (Waldron) - 8:53
4. "Friday the 13th" (Thelonious Monk) - 8:53
- Recorded at Van Gelder Studio, Hackensack, New Jersey on June 22, 1957 (tracks 1, 3 & 4) and June 28, 1957 (track 2)

== Personnel ==
- Teddy Charles - vibraphone
- Mal Waldron - piano
- Addison Farmer - bass
- Jerry Segal - drums
