= Four Altos =

Studio album by Phil Woods, Gene Quill, Sahib Shihab and Hal Stein
- Released: 1957
- Recorded: February 9, 1957
- Studio: Van Gelder Studio, Hackensack, New Jersey
- Genre: Jazz
- Length: 38:16
- Label: Prestige; PRLP 7116
- Producer: Bob Weinstock

Phil Woods chronology
The Young Bloods (1956)	Four Altos (1957)	Sugan (1957)

Four Altos is an album by saxophonists Phil Woods Gene Quill, Sahib Shihab and Hal Stein recorded in 1957 and released on the Prestige label.

== Reception ==
Professional ratings
Review scores
Source	Rating
Allmusic	3/5 stars
The Penguin Guide to Jazz Recordings	2.5/4 stars

In his review for AllMusic, Scott Yanow stated "generally hard-swinging and well-played, but the strong influence of Charlie Parker makes all of the altoists sound alike". John Fordham of The Guardian described Four Altos as a "vigorous jam-session album", adding: "Quill, predominately a big-band player, was a fine foil for the agile Woods, with a darker, but more considered, Cool School sound to mark him out."

== Track listing ==
All compositions by Mal Waldron except as indicated

1. "Pedal Eyes" - 7:34
2. "Kokochee" (Teddy Charles) - 6:25
3. "No More Nights" (Charles) - 4:58
4. "Kinda Kanonic" (Hal Stein) - 5:59
5. "Don't Blame Me" (Dorothy Fields, Jimmy McHugh) - 4:57
6. "Staggers" - 8:23

== Personnel ==
- Phil Woods, Gene Quill, Sahib Shihab, Hal Stein - alto saxophone
- Mal Waldron - piano
- Tommy Potter - bass
- Louis Hayes - drums
