= Jean Swain =

American singer

Jean Adair Swain (August 12, 1923 – July 17, 2000) was born in New York City and grew up in Port Washington, Long Island, where she graduated from high school at age 16. Her musical talents included playing the cello in orchestras and chamber music groups, arranging, composing, and teaching. She was also an accomplished pianist.

She received her degree in music at Smith College (1945) where she was a founding member and arranger for the "Smithereens,"a singing group now a campus tradition.

In 1946 she and her sister, Nancy Swain Overton, founded a vocal quartet The Heathertones with Bix Brent and Pauli Skindlov (later replaced by Marianne McCormick).

After The Heathertones broke up, Jean pursued a career in documentary film production with Robert Drew where she was involved with filming of Yehudi Menuhin, Duke Ellington and the opening of the Metropolitan Opera at Lincoln Center.

In 1988, she joined her sister in a re-formed Chordettes of "Mr. Sandman" fame. Lynn Evans was an original member of that group and Nancy had sung with them for four years. Completing the foursome was Doris Alberti, a long-time barbershop music singer. hey performed at Radio City Music Hall, the Nassau Coliseum and toured with Eddy Arnold. In 1997 the group disbanded and Jean returned to her first love—playing cello in chamber groups and orchestras.

== Sources ==
- Information from interviews with Nancy Overton.
