= George Barrow (musician) =

- Born: September 25, 1921
- Died: March 20, 2013 (aged 91)
- Occupation: Jazz saxophonist
- Instruments: Tenor saxophone, baritone saxophone

George Barrow (September 25, 1921 – March 20, 2013) was an American jazz saxophonist who played both tenor and baritone.

== Career ==
Self-taught on the saxophone, flute, and clarinet, by the mid-1950s, he was playing in different line-ups led by Charles Mingus, including the Quintet (with Eddie Bert, Mal Waldron and Max Roach) before going on to join line-ups led by Ernie Wilkins, including the Ernie Wilkins-Kenny Clarke Septet and the Ernie Wilkins Orchestra, as well as with Oliver Nelson, notably on the classic album The Blues and the Abstract Truth, although he did not take solos on the album.

== Discography ==
=== As leader ===
- The Amram-Barrow Quartet – with David Amram

=== As sideman ===
With Kenny Clarke and Ernie Wilkins

- Kenny Clarke & Ernie Wilkins (Savoy, 1955)

With Charles Mingus

- The Moods of Mingus (Savoy, 1955)
- Mingus at the Bohemia (Debut, 1955)
- The Charles Mingus Quintet & Max Roach (Debut, 1955)

With Teddy Charles

- The Teddy Charles Tentet (Atlantic, 1956)
- Word from Bird (Atlantic, 1957)

With The Three Playmates

- The Three Playmates (Savoy, 1957)

With Eddie "Lockjaw" Davis

- Trane Whistle (Prestige, 1960)

With Oliver Nelson

- The Blues and the Abstract Truth (Impulse, 1961)

With Gene Ammons

- Soul Summit Vol. 2 (Prestige, 1962)
- Late Hour Special (Prestige, 1964)
- Velvet Soul (Prestige, 1964)

With Jimmy Forrest

- Soul Street (New Jazz, 1962)

With Etta Jones

- From the Heart (Prestige, 1962)

With Jimmy Smith

- Bashin': The Unpredictable Jimmy Smith (Verve, 1962)

With Clark Terry

- Clark Terry Plays the Jazz Version of All American (Moodsville, 1962)

With Frank Wess

- Southern Comfort (Prestige, 1962)

With Bill Dixon

- Bill Dixon 7-tette/Archie Shepp and the New York Contemporary 5 (Savoy, 1964)

With Bobby Timmons

- Got to Get It! (Milestone, 1967)

With The Jazz Composer's Orchestra

- The Jazz Composer's Orchestra (ECM, 1968)

With Melvin Van Peebles

- Ain't Supposed to Die a Natural Death (A&M, 1971)

With Jimmy Owens

- Headin' Home (A&M/Horizon, 1978)
