= Hal Stein =

American jazz saxophonist

- Born: Harold Jerome Stein; September 5, 1928; Weehawken, New Jersey, United States
- Origin: New York City
- Died: April 27, 2008 (aged 79) Oakland, California, United States
- Genres: Jazz
- Occupation: Musician
- Instrument: Saxophone

Harold Jerome Stein (September 5, 1928, in Weehawken, New Jersey – April 27, 2008, in Oakland, California) was an American jazz musician and bebop saxophone player.

Stein began performing on the tenor saxophone in the early 1940s in New York City. As a teen he frequently sat in with Don Byas, whom he considered a mentor, and Erroll Garner, at The Three Deuces on 52nd Street. In 1945 he was featured in concert with pianist Teddy Wilson at Town Hall (although he had recently completed high school, he was billed as a high school student to make more of a sensation) on the same bill with Byas, Stuff Smith, and Charlie Parker. During the same year, Stein recorded with Doc Pomus, Tab Smith and Leonard Feather. He went on to work with Gene Krupa, Buddy Morrow, Les Elgart, Artie Shaw, Charles Mingus, Rudy Williams, Roy Haynes, Georgie Auld, Claude Thornhill, J. C. Heard and others. He also played the alto saxophone, recording on it with Al Cohn on "Broadway" (1954); in his own session with Warren Fitzgerald, simply called Hal Stein and Warren Fitzgerald (reissued decades later after becoming something of a cult classic in Japan, under the name Hal Stein-Warren Fitzgerald Quintet-The Classic Sessions") with sidemen Bob Dorough, Paul Motian and Alphonso Cotton (1955); on vibraphonist Teddy Charles's albums The Teddy Charles Tentet album's cd re-release (1956) and Word from Bird (1957); and as one of the Four Altos with Juilliard buddy Phil Woods, Sahib Shihab, and Gene Quill (1957).

He studied at Juilliard during 1950–51. During his stint in the Army jazz band in Japan during the Korean War (1951–1953), he was a regular member of Toshiko Akiyoshi's quartet. When he decided to go back to college in the late-1950s he realized that the GI bill would not cover the cost of completing his degree at Juilliard, so he switched to Manhattan School of Music, where he achieved his master's degree in 1960. Stein embarked on a career as an educator, primarily to make a steady income to support his burgeoning family, while continuing to perform regularly. During the 1960s he taught in public schools in New York and California. Starting in the 1970s, he taught at Stanford University, Mills College, University of California at San Francisco and San Francisco State University, as well as privately. During the late-1970s and early-1980s he taught in Jamey Aebersold workshops around the world.

During the mid-1960s he moved back and forth between the East and West Coasts. In 1968 he moved out West for good, living first in Las Vegas, then in Seattle, and finally settling in the Bay Area in California in 1971, where he remained for the rest of his life. Some of the musicians he played with in this period include Benny Carter, Chick Corea, Sammy Davis Jr., Kenny Dorham, James Brown, Kenny Drew, Elvin Jones, Louis Hayes, Bill Evans, Joe Henderson, Joe Farrell, Nancy Wilson, Jessica Williams, and Rob Schneiderman. He led his own quartet during the 1970s and 1980s, Plank 'n Stein, featuring Al Plank on piano; later incarnations of his quartet were eponymous. In the late-1980s and early-1990s he made several solo tours of Europe, playing in France, Germany, and Italy; his daughter, singer Jennie Stein, joined him for one tour in Italy, and as a guest artist with him on a recording made there, Doctor in Jazz (1991).

Spirit! (his first recording as a leader since 1955) was recorded and released in 2006, featuring his working ensemble of pianist Lee Bloom, bassist John Wiitala and drummer Danny Spencer.

== Personal life ==
Stein was an Ashkenazi Jew, although he rejected his religious upbringing in early adulthood. His father, Ralph Stein, was born Raphael Eisenstein in Dvinsk, Russia (now Daugavpils, Latvia) in 1897; his surname was shortened to Stein at some point during his childhood after emigrating to the U.S. in 1906, in order to assimilate. His mother, Jeanette Weiss, the daughter of Hungarian immigrants, was born in New York City in 1903. He had one sibling, a sister named Marilyn, two years his junior. He married singer Shae Bevan in 1957; they divorced in 1977, and he did not remarry. They had three children: Greg (b. 1957), Jennie (b. 1959), and Naomi (b. 1968). All three have followed in his footsteps as artists and educators. He had three grandchildren, two of whom were born after he died.

He was still active teaching and performing until just a few months before his death from lung cancer at age 79.

== Discography ==
As bandleader

- Hal Stein-Warren Fitzgerald Quintet (Progressive, 1955)
- Spirit! (GuideTone Media, 2006)

With Teddy Charles

- The Teddy Charles Tentet (Atlantic, 1956)
- Word from Bird (Atlantic, 1957)

With Al Cohn

- Broadway (Progressive, 1954)

With Giorgio Diaferia

- Doctor in Jazz (Splasc(H) Records, 1991)

With Tab Smith, Doc Pomus and Leonard Feather

- Blues in the Red (1945)

With Phil Woods, Gene Quill and Sahib Shihab

- Four Altos (Prestige, 1957)
