= A (Jimmy Raney album) =

Studio album by Jimmy Raney
- Released: 1957
- Recorded: May 28, 1954, February 18 and March 8, 1955
- Studio: Van Gelder Studio, Hackensack, New Jersey
- Genre: Jazz
- Length: 46:10
- Label: Prestige; PR 7089
- Producer: Bob Weinstock

Jimmy Raney chronology
Jimmy Raney Visits Paris (1955)	A (1957)	The Four Most Guitars (1956)

A is an album by guitarist Jimmy Raney recorded at three separate sessions between 1954 and 1955 and released on the Prestige label.

== Reception ==
Professional ratings
Review scores
Source	Rating
Allmusic	5/5 stars
The Penguin Guide to Jazz Recordings	4/4 stars

Ken Dryden of Allmusic reviewed the album, stating "This CD contains some of Jimmy Raney's finest work as a leader and is highly recommended".

== Track listing ==
All compositions by Jimmy Raney, except where noted.

1. "Minor" – 4:31
2. "Some Other Spring" (Arthur Herzog, Jr., Irene Kitchings) – 5:01
3. "Double Image" – 4:28
4. "On the Square" – 4:27
5. "Spring Is Here" (Lorenz Hart, Richard Rodgers) – 2:53
6. "One More for the Mode" – 3:49
7. "What's New?" (Johnny Burke, Bob Haggart) – 2:42
8. "Tomorrow Fairly Cloudy" – 3:28
9. "A Foggy Day" (George Gershwin, Ira Gershwin) – 4:07
10. "Someone to Watch over Me" (Gershwin, Gershwin) – 3:12
11. "Cross Your Heart" (Buddy DeSylva, Lewis Gensler, Jimmy Raney) – 3:53
12. "You Don't Know What Love Is" (Gene de Paul, Don Raye) – 3:39

Note

- Tracks 5–12 were initially released on a Prestige 10" LP titled Jimmy Raney 1955 (PRLP199)

== Personnel ==
- Jimmy Raney – guitar
- John Wilson – trumpet (tracks 5–12)
- Hall Overton – piano
- Teddy Kotick – bass
- Art Mardigan (tracks 1–4), Nick Stabulas (tracks 5–12) – drums

=== Production ===
- Bob Weinstock – supervisor
- Rudy Van Gelder – engineer
