= Blue Gardenia (song) =

1953 film composition

Blue Gardenia is the title of a torch song composed by Lester Lee and Bob Russell, for the 1953 movie The Blue Gardenia in which a recording of the song serves as a crucial plot point. The song was recorded for The Blue Gardenia by Nat King Cole who also performs the song in the film as a lounge singer. Cole recorded "Blue Gardenia" in a 20 January 1953 session at the Capitol Records Recording Studio in Hollywood, featuring the Nelson Riddle orchestra. The track was issued as the B-side of Cole's number 16 hit, "Can't I".

== Dinah Washington recording ==
"Blue Gardenia" became a signature song of Dinah Washington whose initial recording was made in the 15 March 1955 New York City sessions for the singer's album For Those in Love which was produced by Quincy Jones. Washington recorded the song a second time on 15 August 1961 during a session for her album I Wanna Be Loved, which version featured the Quincy Jones Orchestra. The 1955 version was featured in the soundtrack of the 1995 film The Bridges of Madison County.

== Other recordings ==
The song has also been recorded on albums by:

- Helen Merrill (You've Got a Date With the Blues, 1958)
- Johnny Mathis (Faithfully, 1960)
- Gloria Lynne (Intimate Moments, 1965)
- Bobby Scott (Star, 1969)
- Bruno Martino (I Remember 1945, 1973)
- Irene Kral (The Gentle Rain, 1977)
- Dexter Gordon (Landslide, 1982)
- Mark Murphy (Sings the Nat King Cole Songbook Volume Two, 1985)
- Ran Blake (Film Noir, 1980)
- Audrey Morris (Film Noir, 1989)
- Della Griffin (Travelin' Light, 1992)
- Diane Schuur (Love Walked In, 1995)
- Lee Morgan (Standards, 1998 release of 1967 recording)
- Etta James (Blue Gardenia, 2001 - featuring Dorothy Leatherwood)
- Patti Wicks (Love's Locked Out, 2003)
- Charles Davis (Blue Gardenia, 2003)
- Stephanie Nakasian (Thrush Hour: A Study of the Great Ladies of Jazz, 2006)
- Joanna Pascale (de) (Through My Eyes, 2008)
- China Moses (vocalist) & Raphaël Lemonnier (pianist) (This One's For Dinah, 2009)
- Branford Marsalis Quartet with vocalist Kurt Elling (Upward Spiral, 2016)
- Diane Marino (Soul Serenade, 2018)
