= John Williams (pianist) =

American jazz musician

John Thomas Williams (January 28, 1929 – December 2018) was an American jazz pianist.

== Early life ==
Williams was born in Windsor, Vermont on January 28, 1929. He began playing piano aged eight and joined a local ensemble at twelve; he also learned organ, and performed in church as a teenager. In March 1945, he embarked on a six-month tour as a member of Mal Hallett's band, having not yet completed high school.

== Later life and career ==
Late in the 1940s, he played with Johnny Bothwell and Teddy Kotick, and at the end of the decade he relocated from Vermont to New York City. After playing a gig with Charlie Parker at the end of 1950, he served in the military during the Korean War (1951–53), playing low brass in Army bands. After the war, he returned to New York, where he enrolled at the Manhattan School of Music, formed his own trio ensemble, and recorded widely as a sideman. His associations around this time included Charlie Barnet, Stan Getz, Sal Salvador, Charlie Mariano, Cannonball Adderley, Jimmy Cleveland, Phil Woods, Al Cohn, Zoot Sims, Jimmy Raney, and Lon Norman.

Williams also recorded two albums as a leader for EmArcy Records in the mid-1950s. His eponymous debut was a trio album, with bassist Bill Anthony and drummer Frank Isola, and was recorded in 1954. The follow-up was also a trio record, with various other musicians, and was made in 1955. The two were released on one CD by Fresh Sound.

Disillusioned with the jazz life in New York, Williams decided to move to Florida, where he played for a time as a pianist in Miami Beach, then receded from performance. He worked as a city commissioner from 1971 to 1991 and held a position in a banking firm while still occasionally playing locally. He also was a regular performer at an annual music festival in Hollywood, Florida, where he played with Bob Brookmeyer, Buddy DeFranco, Terry Gibbs, and Scott Hamilton. In 1987, he appeared with Spike Robinson in Clearwater, Florida. This appearance, plus a piece published in Jazz Journal International in 1994, "helped bring Williams back to the attention of the jazz world", and he recorded two albums in the 1990s. He died on December 14 or 15, 2018.

== Playing style ==
Williams was "strongly influenced by Bud Powell and Horace Silver". AllMusic described him as "Inventive, forceful, with a commanding sense of swing and, importantly, a workmanlike view of the true role of the pianist in both mainstream and bop settings".

== Discography ==
=== As leader ===
Year recorded	Title	Label	Notes
1954	John Williams	EmArcy	Trio, with Bill Anthony (bass), Frank Isola (drums)
1955	John Williams Trio	EmArcy	Trio
1990s?	Welcome Back	Marshmallow	With Spike Robinson (tenor sax), Jeff Grubbs (bass), Frank Isola (drums)

=== As sideman ===
Year recorded	Leader	Title	Label
1953	Stan Getz	Interpretations by the Stan Getz Quintet	Norgran
1953	Stan Getz	Interpretations by the Stan Getz Quintet #2	Norgran
1953–54	Stan Getz	Interpretations by the Stan Getz Quintet #3	Norgran
1954	Stan Getz	Stan Getz at The Shrine	Norgran
1955	Phil Woods	Woodlore	Prestige
1955	Cannonball Adderley	Julian "Cannonball" Adderley	EmArcy
1998	Spike Robinson	The C.T.S. Session	Hep
