= Teo (album) =

Studio album by Teo Macero
- Released: 1957
- Recorded: April 27, 1957; Van Gelder Studio, Hackensack, New Jersey
- Genre: Jazz
- Length: 36:13
- Label: Prestige; PRLP 7104
- Producer: Teddy Charles

Teo Macero chronology
What's New? (1956)	Teo (1957)	New Music in Quarter-Tones (1967)

Teo (also referred to as Teo Macero and the Prestige Jazz Quartet) is an album by saxophonist Teo Macero fronting the Prestige Jazz Quartet, a group nominally led by jazz vibraphonist Teddy Charles, which was recorded in 1957 for the Prestige label.

== Reception ==
Professional ratings
Review scores
Source	Rating
Allmusic	4.5/5 stars

The Allmusic review by Scott Yanow stated "The music is advanced but from the jazz tradition, and overall this set is more noteworthy for Macero's interesting playing than for the tunes themselves".

== Track listing ==
1. "Ghost Story" (Mal Waldron) – 6:27
2. "Please Don't Go Now" (John Ross) – 6:38
3. "Just Spring" (Teo Macero) – 4:52
4. "Star Eyes" (Gene de Paul, Don Raye) – 7:09
5. "Polody" (Teddy Charles) – 5:15
6. "What's Not" (Waldron) – 5:52

== Personnel ==
- Teo Macero – tenor saxophone
- Teddy Charles – vibraphone
- Mal Waldron – piano
- Addison Farmer – bass
- Jerry Segal – drums
