= Subway Night =

Studio album by David Amram
- Released: 1972
- Genre: Jazz
- Label: RCA
- Producer: David Amram

David Amram chronology
No More Walls (1971)	Subway Night (1972)	Havana/New York (1972)

Subway Night is an album by jazz hornist David Amram. It was released in 1972 under RCA Records.

== Track listing ==
1. "Fabulous Fifties"
2. "Little Momma"
3. "Credo"
4. "Subway Night"
5. "Professor and the Panhandler"
6. "Horn and Hardart Succotash Blues"
7. "Neon Casbah"
8. "East and West"
9. "Ballad for Red Allen"
10. "Message to the Politicians of the World"
11. "Mean Dean"

== Personnel ==
- David Amram - piano, vocals, guitar, flute
- Macdougal Street Composers - choir, chorus
- Irwin Markowitz - trumpet
- Tony Miranda - French horn
- Jack O'Hara - guitar
- Randy Peyton Quartet - choir, chorus
- Henry Schuman - oboe
- Midhat Serbagi - viola
- Brooks Tillotson - French horn
- Wilmer Wise - trumpet
- Andy Statman - mandolin
- Al Harewood - drums
- William Arrowsmith - English horn
- Souren Baronian - clarinet
- Dick Baxter - engineer
- Sam T. Brown - guitar
- James Buffington - French horn
- Herb Bushler - bass
- Don Butterfield - tuba
- Earl Chapin - French horn
- Jane Cochran - oboe
- Kenny Kosek - violin
- Marvin Feinsmith - bassoon
- Charles Ganimian -
- Ali Candido Hafid - bongos, congas
- David Bromberg - electric guitar
- Pepper Adams - baritone saxophone
- Joe Beck - electric guitar
- Joe Henderson - tenor saxophone
- Bobby Jones - tenor saxophone, clarinet
- Thad Jones - trumpet
- George Mgrdichian -
- Collin Walcott - tabla
- Bill Watrous - trombone
- Joe Wilder - trumpet
