= Three Trumpets =

Studio album by Art Farmer, Donald Byrd and Idrees Sulieman
- Released: 1957
- Recorded: January 26, 1957
- Studio: Van Gelder Studio, Hackensack, New Jersey
- Genre: Jazz
- Length: 39:22
- Label: Prestige; PRLP 7092
- Producer: Teddy Charles

Idrees Sulieman chronology
Three Trumpets (1957)	Interplay for 2 Trumpets and 2 Tenors (1957)

Donald Byrd chronology
The Young Bloods (1956)	Three Trumpets (1957)	Jazz Lab (1957)

Art Farmer chronology
Farmer's Market (1956)	Three Trumpets (1957)	Last Night When We Were Young (1957)

Three Trumpets is an album by the Prestige All Stars nominally led by trumpeters Art Farmer, Donald Byrd and Idrees Sulieman, recorded in 1957 and released on the New Jazz label.

== Reception ==
Professional ratings
Review scores
Source	Rating
AllMusic	4/5 stars
Down Beat	4/5 stars

Scott Yanow of AllMusic reviewed the album, stating: "Three of the up-and-coming hard bop trumpeters of the 1950s are matched up on this jam session-flavored set. ...Although none of the songs caught on there are some fireworks during these performances".

== Track listing ==
1. "Palm Court Alley" (Idrees Sulieman) – 7:48
2. "Who's Who?" (Art Farmer) – 6:29
3. "Diffusion of Beauty" (Hod O'Brien) – 7:01
4. "Forty Quarters" (Sulieman) – 4:34
5. "You Gotta Dig It to Dig It" (Donald Byrd) – 13:30

== Personnel ==
- Art Farmer, Donald Byrd, Idrees Sulieman – trumpet
- Hod O'Brien – piano
- Addison Farmer – bass
- Ed Thigpen – drums
- Teddy Charles – supervisor
- Rudy Van Gelder – engineer
