= Evolution (Teddy Charles album) =

Studio album by Teddy Charles
- Released: 1957
- Recorded: August 31, 1953 and January 6, 1955; Los Angeles, California and Van Gelder Studio, Hackensack, New Jersey
- Genre: Jazz
- Length: 34:14
- Label: Prestige; PRLP 7078
- Producer: Bob Weinstock (tracks 1-6), Teddy Charles (tracks 7 & 8)

Teddy Charles chronology
Collaboration West (1953)	Evolution (1957)	The Teddy Charles Tentet (1956)

Evolution is an album by jazz vibraphonist and pianist Teddy Charles recorded in 1953 and 1955 for the Prestige label.

== Reception ==
Professional ratings
Review scores
Source	Rating
Allmusic	4/5 stars
The Penguin Guide to Jazz Recordings	3/4 stars

The Allmusic review by Scott Yanow stated "Although somewhat overlooked in the jazz history books, vibraphonist Teddy Charles was for a period an important participant in the early Third Stream movement, using aspects of classical music to revitalize West Coast-style jazz... This session alternates cookers with sensitive ballads and is one of the better recorded showcases for Charles' vibes. Recommended".

== Track listing ==
1. "Violetta" (John Nielson) - 3:37
2. "The Night We Called It a Day" (Matt Dennis, Tom Adair) - 2:41
3. "Jay Walkin'" (J. R. Monterose) - 3:36
4. "Speak Low" (Kurt Weill, Ogden Nash) - 3:16
5. "Relaxo Abstracto" (Teddy Charles) - 5:23
6. "I Can't Get Started" (Vernon Duke, Ira Gershwin) - 7:10
7. "Free" (Shorty Rogers) - 4:18
8. "Evolution" (Jimmy Giuffre) - 4:13
- Recorded in Los Angeles, California on August 31, 1953 (tracks 7 & 8) and at Van Gelder Studio, Hackensack, New Jersey on January 6, 1955 (tracks 1–6)

== Personnel ==
- Teddy Charles - vibraphone, piano
- Shorty Rogers - trumpet (tracks 7 & 8)
- Jimmy Giuffre - tenor saxophone, baritone saxophone (tracks 7 & 8)
- J. R. Monterose - tenor saxophone (tracks 1–6)
- Curtis Counce (tracks 7 & 8), Charles Mingus (tracks 1–6) - bass
- Shelly Manne (tracks 7 & 8), Gerry Segal (tracks 1–6) - drums
