= Modern Art (Art Farmer album) =

1958 studio album by trumpeter Art Farmer

Studio album by Art Farmer
- Released: 1958
- Recorded: September 10–11 & 14, 1958
- Studio: Nola's Penthouse, NYC
- Genre: Jazz
- Length: 40:03
- Label: United Artists; UAL 4007
- Producer: Jack Lewis

Art Farmer chronology
Portrait of Art Farmer (1958)	Modern Art (1958)	Brass Shout (1959)

Modern Art is an album by trumpeter Art Farmer featuring performances recorded in 1958 and originally released on the United Artists label.

== Reception ==
Professional ratings
Review scores
Source	Rating
AllMusic	3.5/5 stars
DownBeat	5/5 stars
The Penguin Guide to Jazz	4/4 stars
Encyclopedia of Popular Music	5/5 stars

The 1958 DownBeat review gave the album a maximum five stars. The AllMusic review stated: "Modern Art is the prelude recording for Art Farmer prior to his partnership in the Jazztet with Benny Golson, and also foreshadows the classy, tasteful inventiveness that group brought to the modern jazz world two years after this 1958 session... the Farmer-Golson combine proved to be a[n] important pairing beyond their initial partnership, with the seeds of that forest flower heard and enjoyed here". The Penguin Guide to Jazz described it as "one of Farmer's most successful records of the period", praising the contributions of pianist Bill Evans in particular.

== Track listing ==
1. "Mox Nix" (Art Farmer) – 4:39
2. "Fair Weather" (Benny Golson) – 5:42
3. "Darn That Dream" (Eddie DeLange, Jimmy Van Heusen) – 3:57
4. "The Touch of Your Lips" (Ray Noble) – 4:52
5. "Jubilation" (Junior Mance) – 4:15
6. "Like Someone in Love" (Johnny Burke, Van Heusen) – 5:55
7. "I Love You" (Cole Porter) – 6:58
8. "Cold Breeze" (Wade Legge) – 3:53

== Personnel ==
- Art Farmer – trumpet
- Benny Golson – tenor saxophone
- Bill Evans – piano
- Addison Farmer – bass
- Dave Bailey – drums
