= Mal/4: Trio =

Studio album by Mal Waldron
- Released: 1958
- Recorded: September 26, 1958
- Studio: Van Gelder Studio, Hackensack, NJ
- Genre: Jazz
- Length: 43:18
- Label: New Jazz

Mal Waldron chronology
Mal/3: Sounds (1958)	Mal/4: Trio (1958)	Left Alone (1959)

Mal/4: Trio is an album by American jazz pianist Mal Waldron recorded in 1958 and released on the New Jazz label.

== Reception ==
The AllMusic review by Scott Yanow awarded the album 4½ stars stating "His sometimes-brooding style was already quite recognizable and his inventive use of repetition was quite impressive. This recording gives listeners a definitive look at the early style of Mal Waldron".

Professional ratings
Review scores
Source	Rating
AllMusic	4.5/5 stars
Penguin Guide to Jazz	3.5/4 stars

== Track listing ==
All compositions by Mal Waldron except as indicated

1. "Splidium-Dow" – 5:20
2. "Like Someone in Love" (Johnny Burke, Jimmy Van Heusen) – 7:12
3. "Get Happy" (Harold Arlen, Ted Koehler) – 4:52
4. "J.M.'s Dream Doll" – 4:18
5. "Too Close for Comfort" (Jerry Bock, Larry Holofcener, George David Weiss) – 11:27
6. "By Myself" (Howard Dietz, Arthur Schwartz) – 4:58
7. "Love Span" – 5:11

- Recorded at Van Gelder Studio in Hackensack, New Jersey on September 26, 1958.

== Personnel ==
- Mal Waldron – piano
- Addison Farmer – bass
- Kenny Dennis – drums
