= Jazz in the Garden at the Museum of Modern Art =

Live album by Teddy Charles
- Released: Feb 1961
- Recorded: August 25, 1960
- Venue: Museum of Modern Art, NYC
- Genre: Jazz
- Length: 43:41
- Label: Warwick; W 2033 ST
- Producer: Jordi Pujol

Teddy Charles chronology
On Campus – Ivy League Jazz Concert (1960)	Jazz in the Garden at the Museum of Modern Art (1961)	Russia Goes Jazz (1963)

Jazz in the Garden at the Museum of Modern Art is a Teddy Charles jazz album recorded live at the Museum of Modern Art in August 1960 and released in February 1961. Music from Jazz In The Garden At The Museum Of Modern Art was later reissued under the title "Sounds of the Inner City.

== Reception ==
Professional ratings
Review scores
Source	Rating
AllMusic	3/5 stars

In an AllMusic review of Sounds of the Inner City (a reissue of Jazz in the Garden at the Museum of Modern Art), Al Campbell stated "This is a noteworthy reissue considering that there are so few instances of Little's lyrical trumpet style and Ervin's passionate tenor recorded together."

== Track listing ==
1. "Introduction" - 0:31
2. "Scoochie (a.k.a. Skoo Chee & Schooche cooche)" (Booker Ervin) - 6:19
3. "Cycles" (Mal Waldron) - 5:39
4. "Embraceable You" (George Gershwin and Ira Gershwin) - 4:42
5. "Blues de Tambour" (Ed Shaughnessy) - 6:06
6. "Take Three Parts Jazz/Route 4/Byriste/Father Greoge" - 12:16
7. "The Confined Few" (Booker Little) - 8:08
8. "Stardust" (Mitchell Parish and Hoagy Carmichael)- available only in some reissues.

== Personnel ==
- Teddy Charles - vibraphone
- Booker Little - trumpet
- Booker Ervin - tenor saxophone
- Mal Waldron - piano
- Addison Farmer - bass
- Ed Shaughnessy - drums
