= Farmer's Market (album) =

Studio album by Art Farmer
- Released: 1958
- Recorded: November 23, 1956
- Studio: Van Gelder Studio, Hackensack, New Jersey
- Genre: Jazz
- Length: 36:32
- Label: New Jazz; PRLP 8203
- Producer: Bob Weinstock

Art Farmer chronology
2 Trumpets (1956)	Farmer's Market (1958)	Three Trumpets (1957)

Farmer's Market is an album by trumpeter Art Farmer, featuring performances recorded in 1956 and released on the New Jazz label.

== Reception ==
Professional ratings
Review scores
Source	Rating
Allmusic	4.5/5 stars
The Penguin Guide to Jazz	3/4 stars
The Rolling Stone Jazz Record Guide	4/5 stars

The Allmusic review stated: "Considering this is early period Farmer, and that his work after leaving the U.S. for Europe led him to playing the softer toned flugelhorn and trumpet exclusively, it is an important document in his legacy, comparing favorably alongside peers Clifford Brown, Miles Davis, and an also emerging Donald Byrd or Lee Morgan". The Penguin Guide to Jazz gave it three stars out of four, commenting positively on Drew's soloing, but stating that the album "suffers slightly from unexpectedly heavy tempos and an erratic performance from Mobley".

== Track listing ==
All compositions by Kenny Drew except as indicated

1. "With Prestige" – 5:13
2. "Ad-Dis-Un" – 6:22
3. "Farmer's Market" (Art Farmer) – 5:50
4. "Reminiscing" (Gigi Gryce) – 4:57
5. "By Myself" (Howard Dietz, Arthur Schwartz) – 7:03
6. "Wailin' with Hank" (Hank Mobley) – 7:13

== Personnel ==
- Art Farmer – trumpet
- Hank Mobley – tenor saxophone (tracks 1–3 & 6)
- Kenny Drew – piano
- Addison Farmer – bass
- Elvin Jones – drums
