= Woodlore (album) =

Studio album by Phil Woods Quartet
- Released: 1956
- Recorded: November 25, 1955
- Studio: Van Gelder Studio, Hackensack, New Jersey
- Genre: Jazz
- Length: 32:58
- Label: Prestige; PRLP 7018
- Producer: Bob Weinstock

Phil Woods chronology
| Pot Pie (1955) | Woodlore (1956) | Pairing Off (1956) |

Woodlore is a studio album by saxophonist Phil Woods' Quartet. It was recorded in 1955 and released on the Prestige Records.

== Reception ==
Professional ratings
Review scores
| Source | Rating |
|---|---|
| AllMusic | 3/5 stars |
| The Rolling Stone Jazz Record Guide | 4/5 stars |
| The Penguin Guide to Jazz Recordings | 3/4 stars |

In his review for AllMusic, Scott Yanow stated "The altoist displays plenty of energy and a strong command of the bebop vocabulary, sounding quite enthusiastic".

== Track listing ==
All compositions by Phil Woods except as indicated

1. "Woodlore" – 5:23
2. "Falling in Love All Over Again" (Neil Hefti) – 4:44
3. "Be My Love" (Sammy Cahn, Nicholas Brodszky) – 5:38
4. "Slow Boat to China" (Frank Loesser) – 5:04
5. "Get Happy" (Harold Arlen, Ted Koehler) – 6:46
6. "Strollin' With Pam" – 5:20

== Personnel ==
- Phil Woods – alto saxophone
- John Williams – piano
- Teddy Kotick – bass
- Nick Stabulas – drums
