= Last Night When We Were Young (album) =

Studio album by Art Farmer
- Released: 1958
- Recorded: March 28, April 24 & 29, 1957, New York, NY
- Genre: Jazz
- Length: 39:18
- Label: ABC-Paramount
- Producer: Creed Taylor

Art Farmer chronology
| Three Trumpets (1957) | Last Night When We Were Young (1958) | Portrait of Art Farmer (1958) |

Professional ratings
Review scores
| Source | Rating |
|---|---|
| AllMusic | 4/5 stars |

Last Night When We Were Young is a studio album by trumpeter Art Farmer - with an orchestra of strings arranged and conducted by Quincy Jones. It was recorded in three sessions in 1957 and released the following year on ABC-Paramount.

== Track listing ==
1. "Two Sleepy People" (Hoagy Carmichael, Frank Loesser) – 3:14
2. "Someone to Watch Over Me" (George Gershwin, Ira Gershwin) – 3:35
3. "I Concentrate on You" (Cole Porter) – 2:54
4. "Ill Wind" (Harold Arlen, Ted Koehler) – 3:43
5. "Last Night When We Were Young" (Arlen, Yip Harburg) – 3:00
6. "Out of This World" (Arlen, Johnny Mercer) – 4:07
7. "When I Fall in Love" (Victor Young, Edward Heyman) – 3:34
8. "Tangorine" (Dizzy Gillespie) – 2:45
9. "What's Good About Goodbye?" (Arlen, Leo Robin) – 3:41

== Personnel ==
- Art Farmer – trumpet
- Hank Jones – piano
- Tommy Kay – guitar (on March 28, tracks 2, 4, 8)
- Barry Galbraith – guitar (on April 24 & 29)
- Addison Farmer – bass
- Osie Johnson – drums (on March 28, tracks 2, 4, 8)
- Sol Gubin – drums (on April 24 & 29)
- Quincy Jones – arranger, conductor
- Orchestra on March 28
  - Jim Buffington – French horn
  - Romeo Penque – flute
  - Harry Lookofsky, Gene Orloff, Leonard Posner, Arnold Eidus, Julius Held – violin
  - David Mankovitz, Walter Trampler – viola
  - George Ricci – cello
- Orchestra on April 24
  - Don Corrado – French horn
  - Sal Amato – flute
  - Harry Lookofsky, Gene Orloff, Leonard Posner, Arnold Eidus, Harry Urbout – violin
  - David Mankovitz, Howard Kay – viola
  - George Ricci – cello
- Orchestra on April 29
  - Sal Amato, Jerry Sanfino, Stan Webb, flute
  - Harry Lookofsky, Gene Orloff, Leonard Posner, Alvin Rudnitsky, Sol Shapiro – violin
  - Howard Kay, Burt Fisch – viola
  - Maurice Brown – cello
  - Betty Glamann – harp
