= Mal Hallett =

American jazz violinist and bandleader (1893–1952)

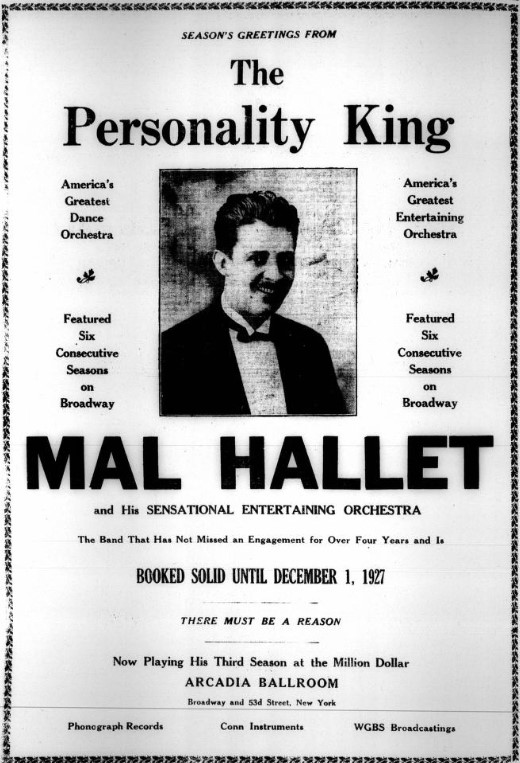
1926 season's greetings with last name spelled "Hallet"

Mal Hallett (born 1893, Roxbury, Massachusetts – died November 20, 1952, Boston) was an American jazz violinist and bandleader.

== Biography ==
Hallett was a graduate of the Boston Conservatory of Music. He played in France during World War I as a member of Al Moore's orchestra, and led his own band, primarily in New England, for much of the 1930s. His ensemble featured a large number of sidemen who went on to become noted for their own achievements, including Gene Krupa, Jack Teagarden, Frankie Carle, Jack Jenney, Toots Mondello, Irene Daye, Floyd O'Brien, Spud Murphy, Boots Mussulli, Brad Gowans, Turk Murphy, Teddy Grace, John Williams, and Don Fagerquist.

Hallett was an older swing bandleader, and had trouble winning over younger fans, to the detriment of his career. He also battled alcoholism for much of his life, and an arm injury incurred while drunk prevented him from playing violin later in life. He died in 1952 in Boston.
