= Once a Thief and Other Themes =

Studio album by Lalo Schifrin
- Released: 1965
- Recorded: May 21 & 23, 1965
- Studio: Van Gelder Studio, Englewood Cliffs, New Jersey
- Genre: Jazz
- Length: 29:46
- Label: Verve; V-8624
- Producer: Creed Taylor

Lalo Schifrin chronology
The Liquidator (1965)	Once a Thief and Other Themes (1965)	The Cincinnati Kid (1965)

Once a Thief and Other Themes is an album of film and television themes by Argentine composer, pianist and conductor Lalo Schifrin recorded in 1965 and released on the Verve label. The album features rerecorded versions of Schifrin's themes from the motion pictures Once a Thief and Joy House and a theme inspired by the television series The Man from U.N.C.L.E..

Professional ratings
Review scores
Source	Rating
Allmusic	3/5 stars

== Track listing ==
All compositions by Lalo Schifrin except as noted

1. "Blues a Go Go" - 2:49
2. "Once a Thief" (Dorcas Cochran, Schifrin) - 2:02
3. "Insinuations" - 3:35
4. "The Right to Love" (Gene Lees, Schifrin) - 3:07
5. "The Cat" - 2:35
6. "The Man from T.H.R.U.S.H." - 2:57
7. "Roulette Rhumba" - 2:10
8. "The Joint" - 4:23
9. "Once a Thief (Instrumental)" - 2:02
10. "Return to Trieste" - 4:06
- Recorded at Van Gelder Studio in Englewood Cliffs, New Jersey on May 21 (tracks 6, 8 & 9) and May 23 (tracks 1–5, 7 & 10), 1965

== Personnel ==
- Lalo Schifrin - piano, arranger, conductor
- Freddie Hubbard, Ernie Royal, Snooky Young, Clark Terry - trumpet
- Jimmy Cleveland, J. J. Johnson, Tony Studd, Bob Brookmeyer - trombone
- Jim Buffington, Bob Northern, Willie Ruff - French horn
- Phil Woods - alto saxophone, clarinet, flute
- Jerome Richardson, James Moody - tenor saxophone, flute
- Margaret Ross - harp
- Kenny Burrell - guitar
- Don Butterfield - tuba
- Bob Cranshaw - bass
- Grady Tate, Dave Bailey - drums
- Irene Reid - vocal
- Unnamed string section
