= Brass Shout =

Studio album by Art Farmer
- Released: 1959
- Recorded: May 14, 1959
- Genre: Jazz
- Length: 33:26
- Label: United Artists; UAL 4047
- Producer: Tom Wilson

Art Farmer chronology
Modern Art (1958)	Brass Shout (1959)	The Aztec Suite (1959)

Professional ratings
Review scores
Source	Rating
Allmusic	4/5 stars

Brass Shout is an album by trumpeter Art Farmer, featuring a brass ensemble arranged and conducted by Benny Golson. Recorded in 1959, the album was originally released on the United Artists label.

== Recording ==
The album was recorded in Nola Studies in New York City.

== Reception ==
The Allmusic review stated: "Golson's well-crafted arrangements back Farmer's superb solos with flair". The Penguin Guide to Jazz commented: "the arrangements are fairly laid-back and use the ensemble rather sparingly, leaving lots of space for the featured horns".

== Track listing ==
All compositions by Benny Golson, except as indicated

1. "Nica's Dream" (Horace Silver) – 5:55
2. "Autumn Leaves" (Joseph Kosma, Jacques Prévert, Johnny Mercer) – 5:08
3. "Moanin'" (Bobby Timmons) – 5:47
4. "April in Paris" (Vernon Duke, E. Y. Harburg) – 4:00
5. "Five Spot After Dark" – 4:52
6. "Stella by Starlight" (Victor Young, Ned Washington) – 3:50
7. "Minor Vamp" – 3:54

== Personnel ==
=== Musicians ===
The following played on most tracks:

- Art Farmer, Lee Morgan, Ernie Royal – trumpet
- Julius Watkins – French horn
- Jimmy Cleveland, Curtis Fuller – trombone
- James Haughton – baritone horn
- Don Butterfield – tuba
- Percy Heath – bass
- Philly Joe Jones – drums
- Benny Golson – arranger and conductor

The following replacements or additions played on the stated tracks:

- Wayne Andre – trombone on track 4, replacing Cleveland; and on tracks 1, 2, 6, replacing Haughton
- Bob Northern – French horn on track 4, replacing Watkins
- Bobby Timmons – piano on track 3
- Elvin Jones – drums on tracks 1, 2, 6, replacing Philly Joe Jones

=== Production ===
- Tom Wilson – production
- Lew Merritt – recording engineering
- Hugh Bell – photography
