= Cliff Smalls =

American jazz trombonist, pianist, and conductor

Clifton Arnold (3 March 1918 – 2008), better known as Cliff Smalls, was an American jazz trombonist, pianist, conductor and arranger who worked in the jazz, soul and rhythm & blues genres.

== Early life ==
Smalls was raised in Charleston, South Carolina. His father, a carpenter, performed piano and organ for Charleston's Central Baptist Church. He taught Smalls classical music at an early age.

== Later life and career ==
=== Jazz, early years of bebop ===
Smalls left Charleston with the Carolina Cotton Pickers, and also recorded with them, for instance "Off and on Blues" and "Deed I Do" (arranged by Smalls and also featuring Cat Anderson) in 1937, when Smalls was 19. His career coincided with the early years of bebop. From 1942 to 1946 he was a trombonist, arranger and also backup piano-player for band-leader and pianist Earl Hines, alongside Dizzy Gillespie and Charlie Parker, also then in the Hines band which often broadcast seven nights a week on open mikes coast-to-coast across America. Hines also used Teddy Wilson, Jess Stacy and Nat "King" Cole as backup piano-players but Smalls was his favorite. Smalls also played in the Jimmie Lunceford and Erskine Hawkins bands.

=== Singers, popular direction, return to jazz roots ===
After the inevitable post-World War II break-up of the Hines big-band, Smalls went on to play and record in smaller ensembles with his former Earl Hines band colleagues, singer and band-leader Billy Eckstine, trombonist Bennie Green, saxophonist Earl Bostic and singer Sarah Vaughan. In 1949 he recorded with JJ Johnson and Charlie Rouse. Smalls was the pianist on Earl Bostic's 1950 hit 'Flamingo' [along with John Coltrane] but had a serious automobile accident, with Earl Bostic, in 1951 "so I laid in bed all of 1952, til March 1953".

Recovering, Smalls shifted his musical career to serve as music director/arranger for singers Eartha Kitt, Ella Fitzgerald, Sammy Davis Jr., Smokey Robinson and the Miracles, Clyde McPhatter, Roy Hamilton and Brook Benton. He recorded Bennie Green with Art Farmer in 1956 and was, for many years, a regular with Sy Oliver's nine-piece "Little Big-Band" including, from 1974 to 1984, a regular stint in New York's Rainbow Room.

In the 1970s Smalls returned to jazz-recording, including four solo tracks for The Complete Master Jazz Piano Series in 1970, with Sy Oliver in 1973, Texas Twister with Buddy Tate in 1975, Swing and Things in 1976 and 'Caravan' in France in 1978.

In 1980 Smalls was featured playing piano in The Cotton Club, directed by Francis Ford Coppola.
