= Bennie Green with Art Farmer =

Studio album by Bennie Green
- Released: 1956
- Recorded: April 13, 1956
- Studio: Van Gelder Studio, Hackensack, New Jersey
- Genre: Jazz
- Length: 33:48
- Label: Prestige

Bennie Green chronology
Bennie Green with Strings (1956)	Bennie Green with Art Farmer (1956)	Walking Down (1956)

Professional ratings
Review scores
Source	Rating
AllMusic	3/5 stars
The Penguin Guide to Jazz Recordings	3/4 stars

Bennie Green with Art Farmer is an album by American trombonist Bennie Green with trumpeter Art Farmer. It was recorded in 1956 and released on the Prestige label.

== Reception ==
The AllMusic review by Scott Yanow awarded the album 3 stars and stated: "The playing is not flawless on this recording but the soloists take chances and the music is often exciting. It's recommended to straightahead jazz fans."

== Track listing ==
All compositions by Bennie Green except where noted.

1. "My Blue Heaven" (Walter Donaldson, George A. Whiting) – 5:26
2. "Sky Coach" (Art Farmer) – 5:31
3. "Cliff Dweller" (Cliff Smalls) – 5:50
4. "Let's Stretch" – 10:52
5. "Gone With the Wind" (Herb Magidson, Allie Wrubel) – 6:24

== Personnel ==
- Bennie Green – trombone
- Art Farmer – trumpet
- Cliff Smalls – piano
- Addison Farmer – bass
- Philly Joe Jones – drums
