= After Hours (Thad Jones album) =

Studio album by Thad Jones
- Released: 1957
- Recorded: June 21, 1957
- Studio: Van Gelder Studio, Hackensack, New Jersey
- Genre: Jazz
- Length: 41:07
- Label: Prestige; PR 7118
- Producer: Bob Weinstock

Thad Jones chronology
Olio (1957)	After Hours (1957)	Keepin' Up with the Joneses (1958)

After Hours is an album by the Prestige All Stars nominally led by trumpeter Thad Jones recorded in 1957 and released on the Prestige label. The album was also re-released as Steamin' by Frank Wess and Kenny Burrell in 1963.

== Reception ==
Professional ratings
Review scores
Source	Rating
Allmusic	4/5 stars
The Penguin Guide to Jazz Recordings	3/4 stars

Scott Yanow of Allmusic reviewed the album, stating "The all-star lineup is in fine form on the straightahead material and bop fans will want to pick up this".

== Track listing ==
All compositions by Mal Waldron.

1. "Steamin'" – 9:20
2. "Blue Jelly" – 11:20
3. "Count One" – 7:52
4. "Empty Street" – 12:35

== Personnel ==
- Thad Jones – trumpet
- Frank Wess – flute, tenor saxophone
- Mal Waldron – piano
- Kenny Burrell – guitar
- Paul Chambers – bass
- Art Taylor – drums

=== Production ===
- Bob Weinstock – supervisor
- Rudy Van Gelder – engineer
