= Word from Bird =

Studio album by Teddy Charles
- Released: 1957
- Recorded: October 23 and November 12, 1956; New York City
- Genre: Jazz
- Length: 41:30
- Label: Atlantic; LP 1274
- Producer: Nesuhi Ertegun

Teddy Charles chronology
Teddy Charles Tentet (1956)	Word from Bird (1957)	Vibe-Rant (1957)

Word from Bird is an album by American jazz vibraphonist Teddy Charles released on the Atlantic label in 1957.

== Reception ==
Professional ratings
Review scores
Source	Rating
Allmusic	3/5 stars

Allmusic calls the album "enjoyable".

== Track listing ==
All compositions by Teddy Charles except as indicated

1. "Word from Bird" - 10:06
2. "Laura" (David Raksin, Johnny Mercer) - 4:52
3. "Show Time" (Bob Brookmeyer) - 6:04
4. "When Your Lover Has Gone" (Einar Aaron Swan) - 2:27
5. "Just One of Those Things" (Cole Porter) - 6:06
6. "Blue Greens" - 11:42
- Recorded in New York City on October 23, 1956 (tracks 1 & 3) and November 12, 1956 (tracks 2 & 4–6)

== Personnel ==
- Teddy Charles -vibraphone
- Art Farmer - trumpet (tracks 1 & 3)
- Eddie Bert - trombone (track 1)
- Jim Buffington - French horn (track 1)
- Don Butterfield - tuba (tracks 1 & 3)
- Hal Stein - alto saxophone (tracks 1 & 3)
- Bob Newman - tenor saxophone (tracks 1 & 3)
- George Barrow - baritone saxophone (tracks 1 & 3)
- Hall Overton - piano
- Jimmy Raney - guitar (tracks 1 & 3)
- Addison Farmer - bass (tracks 1 & 3)
- Charles Mingus - bass (tracks 2 & 4–6)
- Ed Shaughnessy - drums
