= Portrait of Art Farmer =

Studio album by Art Farmer
- Released: 1958
- Recorded: April 19 and May 1, 1958; New York City
- Genre: Jazz
- Length: 46:47 (reissue)
- Label: Contemporary; S 7027
- Producer: Nat Hentoff

Art Farmer chronology
Last Night When We Were Young (1957)	Portrait of Art Farmer (1958)	Modern Art (1958)

Professional ratings
Review scores
Source	Rating
Penguin Guide to Jazz	4/4 stars
Allmusic	4.5/5 stars
The Rolling Stone Jazz Record Guide	4/5 stars

Portrait of Art Farmer is an album by trumpeter Art Farmer featuring performances recorded in 1958 and released on the Contemporary label. It was recorded when Farmer was adjusting to moving from Horace Silver's band, where he received a high level of rhythmic and harmonic support from the rhythm section, to Gerry Mulligan's quartet, where there was no piano and only light backing.

== Reception ==
The Penguin Guide to Jazz selected the album as part of its suggested Core Collection stating "The rhythm section is beautifully balanced and offers exemplary support to the leader, whose playing summons elegance, fire and craftsmanship in almost perfect accord, with his ballad playing particularly refined". The Allmusic review called the album "an excellent showcase for trumpeter Art Farmer in the 1950s".

== Track listing ==
All compositions by Art Farmer except as indicated

1. "Back in the Cage" – 5:04
2. "Stablemates" (Benny Golson) – 4:32
3. "The Very Thought of You" (Ray Noble) – 5:41
4. "And Now..." – 6:07
5. "Nita" (George Russell) – 4:28
6. "By Myself" (Howard Dietz, Arthur Schwartz) – 6:15
7. "Too Late Now" (Burton Lane, Alan Jay Lerner) – 5:55
8. "Earth" – 4:10
9. "The Folks Who Live On the Hill" (Oscar Hammerstein II, Jerome Kern) – 4:35

The original release on Contemporary contained tracks 1–8; track 9 was added to the Original Jazz Classics reissue.

Tracks 1, 2, 5, 6 and 7 were recorded on April 19, 1958, the remainder on May 1, 1958.

"Back in the Cage" is a 12-bar blues with a theme that is not stated until Farmer's second entry. "Stablemates" is a 36-bar number in ABA form, with each A section lasting 14 bars; it contains several ii-V-I progressions. "The Very Thought of You" and "By Myself" are played by Farmer with a cup mute. "And Now..." is an up-tempo composition by Farmer over the chord changes from 'I Got Rhythm'. The ballad "Too Late Now" has a brassier trumpet performance from Farmer, as opposed to his breathier playing on the other tracks. "Earth" is a blues, played in a simple, swinging style.

== Personnel ==
- Art Farmer – trumpet
- Hank Jones – piano
- Addison Farmer – bass
- Roy Haynes – drums
