= All Star Sessions =

Studio album by Gene Ammons
- Released: 1956
- Recorded: March 5 & October 28, 1950 | January 31, 1951 | June 15, 1955
- Studios: Apex Studios - NYC & Van Gelder Studio - Hackensack, NJ
- Genre: Jazz
- Length: 54:40
- Labels: Prestige; PRLP 7050
- Producer: Bob Weinstock

Gene Ammons chronology
Golden Saxophone (1953)	All Star Sessions (1956)	The Happy Blues (1956)

All Star Sessions is an album by saxophonist Gene Ammons recorded between 1950 and 1955 and released on the Prestige label.

== Reception ==
Professional ratings
Review scores
Source	Rating
Allmusic	4.5/5 stars
The Rolling Stone Jazz Record Guide	5/5 stars
The Penguin Guide to Jazz Recordings	3.5/4 stars

The Allmusic review by Stewart Mason stated: "A bop classic, All-Star Session was the recording debut of Gene Ammons as a leader with his group the Gene Ammons All-Stars, featuring his fellow tenor saxophonist Sonny Stitt... Those looking to explore Stitt and Ammons' enormous catalogs (both together and separately) could do much worse than starting right here".

== Track listing ==
All compositions by Gene Ammons and Sonny Stitt, except where indicated.

1. "Woofin' and Tweetin'" (Gene Ammons) – 15:05
2. "Juggernaut" (Ammons) – 10:28
3. "Blues Up and Down" [take 3] – 2:39
4. "Blues Up and Down" [take 1] – 1:28 Bonus track on CD reissue
5. "Blues Up and Down" [take 2] – 2:23 Bonus track on CD reissue
6. "You Can Depend on Me" [take 1] (Charlie Carpenter, Louis Dunlap, Earl Hines) – 2:50
7. "You Can Depend on Me" [take 2] (Carpenter, Dunlap, Hines) – 2:50 Bonus track on CD reissue
8. "Stringin' the Jug" – 5:05
9. "New Blues Up and Down" – 5:07
10. "Bye Bye" (Jimmy Mundy) – 3:02 Bonus track on CD reissue
11. "When I Dream of You" (Carpenter, Hines) – 2:55 Bonus track on CD reissue
12. "A Lover Is Blue" (Carpenter, Mundy, James Oliver Young) – 2:46

Note

- Recorded in New York City on March 5, 1950 (tracks 3–7 & 10), October 28, 1950 (tracks 8, 11 & 12), January 31, 1951 (track 9) and at Van Gelder Studio in Hackensack New Jersey on June 15, 1955 (tracks 1 & 2)

== Personnel ==
- Gene Ammons – tenor saxophone, baritone saxophone
- Sonny Stitt – tenor saxophone, baritone saxophone (tracks 3–10)
- Art Farmer (tracks 1 & 2), Billy Massey (tracks 9 & 10) – trumpet
- Chippy Outcalt – trombone (track 9)
- Lou Donaldson – alto saxophone (tracks 1 & 2)
- Charlie Bateman (track 9), Duke Jordan (tracks 3–7 & 10), Junior Mance (track 8, 11 & 12), Freddie Redd (tracks 1 & 2) – piano
- Addison Farmer (tracks 1 & 2), Tommy Potter (tracks 3–7 & 10), Gene Wright (tracks 8, 9, 11 & 12) – bass
- Art Blakey (track 9), Kenny Clarke (tracks 1 & 2), Jo Jones (tracks 3–7 & 10), Wes Landers (tracks 8, 11 & 12) – drums
- Larry Townsend – vocals (track 9)
