= The Happy Blues =

Studio album by Gene Ammons
- Released: 1956
- Recorded: April 23, 1956
- Studio: Van Gelder Studio, Hackensack, New Jersey
- Genre: Jazz
- Length: 40:02
- Label: Prestige; PRLP 7039
- Producer: Bob Weinstock

Gene Ammons chronology
All Star Sessions (1950-55)	The Happy Blues (1956)	Jammin' with Gene (1956)

The Happy Blues is an album by saxophonist Gene Ammons recorded in 1956 and released on the Prestige label.

== Reception ==
Professional ratings
Review scores
Source	Rating
AllMusic	5/5 stars
The Rolling Stone Jazz Record Guide	5/5 stars
The Penguin Guide to Jazz Recordings	3/4 stars

The AllMusic review by Scott Yanow stated: "This is one of the great studio jam sessions... a highly recommended set".

== Track listing ==
1. "The Happy Blues" (Art Farmer) – 12:08
2. "The Great Lie" (Cab Calloway, Andy Gibson) – 8:42
3. "Can't We Be Friends?" (Paul James, Kay Swift) – 12:54
4. "Madhouse" (Jackie McLean) – 6:42

== Personnel ==
- Gene Ammons – tenor saxophone
- Art Farmer – trumpet
- Jackie McLean – alto saxophone
- Duke Jordan – piano
- Addison Farmer – bass
- Art Taylor – drums
- Candido – congas
