= Coolin' =

Studio album by Teddy Charles
- Released: 1959
- Recorded: April 14, 1957
- Studio: Van Gelder Studio, Hackensack, New Jersey
- Genre: Jazz
- Length: 43:12
- Label: New Jazz; NJLP 8216
- Producer: Teddy Charles

Teddy Charles chronology
| Vibe-Rant (1957) | Coolin' (1959) | 3 For Duke (1957) |

Coolin' is an album by the Prestige All Stars nominally led by vibraphonist Teddy Charles recorded in 1957 and released on the Prestige label.

== Reception ==
Professional ratings
Review scores
| Source | Rating |
|---|---|
| Allmusic | 4/5 stars |
| The Penguin Guide to Jazz Recordings | 3/4 stars |

Allmusic reviewed the album stating "The group plays five originals by bandmembers that often have complex melodies but familiar chord changes. ...This obscure session is an excellent outing".

== Track listing ==
1. "Staggers" (Mal Waldron) – 7:52
2. "Song of a Star" (John Jenkins) – 7:11
3. "The Eagle Flies" (Idrees Sulieman) – 7:38
4. "Bunni" (Teddy Charles) – 8:02
5. "Reiteration" (Waldron) – 7:56
6. "Everything Happens to Me" (Matt Dennis, Tom Adair) – 4:33

== Personnel ==
- Teddy Charles – vibraphone
- Idrees Sulieman – trumpet
- John Jenkins – alto saxophone (tracks 1–5)
- Mal Waldron – piano
- Addison Farmer – bass
- Jerry Segal – drums

Production

- Teddy Charles – supervisor
- Rudy Van Gelder – engineer
