= 2 Trumpets =

Studio album by Art Farmer and Donald Byrd
- Released: January 1957
- Recorded: August 3, 1956
- Studio: Van Gelder Studio, Hackensack, New Jersey
- Genre: Jazz
- Length: 42:00
- Label: Prestige; PRLP 7062
- Producer: Bob Weinstock

Art Farmer chronology
Art Farmer Quintet featuring Gigi Gryce (1955)	2 Trumpets (1957)	Farmer's Market (1956)

Donald Byrd chronology
Byrd Blows on Beacon Hill (1956)	2 Trumpets (1956)	The Young Bloods (1956)

2 Trumpets is an album by trumpeters Art Farmer and Donald Byrd, recorded in 1956 and released on the Prestige label. They are joined by Jackie McLean in the front line for the uptempo pieces but have a ballad quartet track apiece.

== Reception ==
Professional ratings
Review scores
Source	Rating
Allmusic	3/5 stars
The Penguin Guide to Jazz	2.5/4 stars
The Rolling Stone Jazz Record Guide	4/5 stars

In a contemporaneous review, Billboard was positive, commenting that it is a "very enjoyable LP for the modern jazz customer". In Ron Wynn's review for Allmusic, he stated: "This nice date puts two top trumpets together". The Penguin Guide to Jazz gave it two-and-a-half stars out of four, describing it as "capable but routine".

== Track listing ==
1. "The Third" (Donald Byrd) – 7:42
2. "Contour" (Kenny Drew) – 7:38
3. "When Your Lover Has Gone" (Einar Aaron Swan) – 5:13
4. "Dig" (Miles Davis) – 14:29
5. "'Round Midnight" (Thelonious Monk, Cootie Williams, Bernie Hanighen) – 6:38

== Personnel ==
- Art Farmer – trumpet (tracks 1–4)
- Donald Byrd – trumpet (tracks 1, 2, 4 & 5)
- Jackie McLean – alto saxophone (tracks 1, 2 & 4)
- Barry Harris – piano
- Doug Watkins – bass
- Art Taylor – drums
