= Olio (Thad Jones album) =

Studio album by Thad Jones
- Released: 1957
- Recorded: February 16, 1957; Van Gelder Studio, Hackensack, New Jersey
- Genre: Jazz
- Length: 38:05
- Label: Prestige; PR 7084
- Producer: Teddy Charles

Thad Jones chronology
The Jones Boys (1957)	Olio (1957)	After Hours (1957)

Olio is an album by the Prestige All Stars nominally led by trumpeter Thad Jones recorded in 1957 and released on the Prestige label.

== Reception ==
Professional ratings
Review scores
Source	Rating
Allmusic	4/5 stars
Disc	4/5 stars

Allmusic reviewer Scott Yanow stated: "Although this was not a regular group and there is not an obvious leader, the music is on a higher level than that of a routine jam session. The challenging material and the high quality playing of the young greats makes this fairly obscure modern mainstream set well worth exploring".

== Track listing ==
All compositions by Teddy Charles except as indicated

1. "Potpourri" (Mal Waldron) - 6:04
2. "Blues Without Woe" - 7:58
3. "Touché" (Waldron) - 6:25
4. "Dakar" - 6:58
5. "Embraceable You" (George Gershwin, Ira Gershwin) - 4:17
6. "Hello Frisco" - 6:23

== Personnel ==
- Thad Jones - trumpet
- Frank Wess - flute, tenor saxophone
- Mal Waldron - piano
- Teddy Charles - vibraphone
- Doug Watkins - bass
- Elvin Jones - drums

=== Production ===
- Teddy Charles - supervisor
- Rudy Van Gelder - engineer
