= James Buffington =

American hornist (1922–1981)

- Born: James Lawrence Buffington; 15 May 1922; Jersey Shore, Pennsylvania, U.S.
- Died: July 20, 1981 (aged 59) Englewood, New Jersey, U.S.
- Genres: jazz
- Instrument: French horn

James Lawrence Buffington (May 15, 1922, Jersey Shore, Pennsylvania – July 20, 1981, Englewood, New Jersey) was an American jazz, studio, and classical hornist.

Buffington was a busy studio and jazz player on the French horn. He was an autodidact as a child, though his father played piano and trumpet. He graduated from the Eastman School of Music and began playing in New York City in the 1950s, with Oscar Pettiford among others. He played with Mel Powell in 1954 and Teddy Charles in 1956.

He is perhaps best known for his work with Miles Davis on some of his Gil Evans sessions for Columbia Records. He has done extensive work as a session musician, and has recorded with Moondog, Carly Simon, James Brown, Urbie Green, Jimmy Cleveland, Ernie Royal, Britt Woodman, Don Butterfield, Donald Byrd, John Coltrane, Dizzy Gillespie, J. J. Johnson, Quincy Jones, Thad Jones and Mel Lewis, Michel Legrand, Lee Morgan, Paul Desmond, Eddie Sauter, Oliver Nelson, Wes Montgomery, Jimmy Smith, the Modern Jazz Quartet and Grover Washington, Jr. Late in the 1970s he played with Freddie Hubbard, Gato Barbieri and George Benson; in 1980 he played on a Helen Merrill album.

Buffington released some solo work but it is far less well known.

== Discography ==
With Manny Albam

- The Drum Suite (RCA Victor, 1956) with Ernie Wilkins
- Brass on Fire (Sold State, 1966)

With Gato Barbieri

- Chapter Three: Viva Emiliano Zapata (Impulse!, 1974)

With Donald Byrd

- I'm Tryin' to Get Home (Blue Note, 1965)

With Teddy Charles

- Word from Bird (Atlantic, 1957)

With Al Cohn

- Son of Drum Suite (RCA Victor, 1960)

With John Coltrane

- The Complete Africa/Brass Session (Impulse! Records, 1961)

With Hank Crawford

- Wildflower (Kudu, 1973)

With Miles Davis

- Miles Ahead (Columbia, 1957)
- Sketches Of Spain (Columbia, 1959–60)

With Paul Desmond

- Summertime (A&M/CTI, 1968)
- From the Hot Afternoon (A&M/CTI, 1969)

With Bill Evans

- Symbiosis (MPS, 1974)

With Gil Evans

- The Individualism of Gil Evans (Verve, 1963–64)

With Art Farmer

- The Aztec Suite (United Artists, 1959)
- Listen to Art Farmer and the Orchestra (Mercury, 1962)

With Maynard Ferguson

- The Blues Roar (Mainstream, 1965)

With Curtis Fuller

- Cabin in the Sky (Impulse!, 1962)

With Stan Getz

- Mickey One (Verve, 1965)
- What the World Needs Now: Stan Getz Plays Burt Bacharach and Hal David (Verve, 1968)

With Dizzy Gillespie

- Dizzy and Strings (Norgran, 1954)
- Gillespiana (Verve, 1960)
- Carnegie Hall Concert (Verve, 1961)
- Perceptions (Verve, 1961)

With Coleman Hawkins

- The Hawk in Hi Fi (RCA Victor, 1956)

With Jimmy Heath

- Swamp Seed (Riverside, 1963)

With Jackie and Roy

- Time & Love (CTI, 1972)

With J. J. Johnson

- J.J.! (RCA Victor, 1964)
- Broadway Express (RCA Victor, 1965)

With Quincy Jones

- Quincy Jones Explores the Music of Henry Mancini (Mercury, 1964)
- Golden Boy (Mercury, 1964)
- Quincy Plays for Pussycats (Mercury, 1959-65 [1965])
- Strike Up the Band (Mercury, 1964)

With Yusef Lateef

- The Doctor is In... and Out (Atlantic, 1976)

With Michel Legrand

- Legrand Jazz (Philips, 1958)

With Mundell Lowe

- New Music of Alec Wilder (Riverside, 1956)
- Satan in High Heels (soundtrack) (Charlie Parker, 1961)

With Arif Mardin

- Journey (Atlantic, 1974)

With Helen Merrill

- Casa Forte (Emarcy, 1980)

With the Modern Jazz Quartet

- Plastic Dreams (Atlantic, 1971)

With Hugo Montenegro

- Arriba! (Time Records, 1960)

With James Moody

- Moody with Strings (Argo, 1961)
- The Blues and Other Colors (Milestone, 1969)

With David "Fathead" Newman

- Scratch My Back (Prestige, 1979)

With Houston Person

- Broken Windows, Empty Hallways (Prestige, 1972)

With Lalo Schifrin

- Once a Thief and Other Themes (Verve, 1965)

With Don Sebesky

- Giant Box (CTI, 1973)

With Sonny Stitt

- Mr. Bojangles (Cadet, 1973)

With Gábor Szabó

- Mizrab (CTI, 1972)

With Billy Taylor

- My Fair Lady Loves Jazz (Impulse!, 1957)

With Stanley Turrentine

- The Man with the Sad Face (Fantasy, 1976)
- Nightwings (Fantasy, 1977)

With Julius Watkins

- French Horns for My Lady (Philips, 1962)

With Randy Weston

- Blue Moses (CTI, 1972)

With Phil Woods

- Round Trip (Verve, 1969)
