= The Young Bloods =

Studio album by Phil Woods and Donald Byrd
- Released: April 1957
- Recorded: November 2, 1956; Van Gelder Studio, Hackensack, New Jersey
- Genre: Jazz
- Length: 35:58
- Label: Prestige; PRLP 7080
- Producer: Bob Weinstock

Phil Woods chronology
Pairing Off (1956)	The Young Bloods (1957)	Four Altos (1957)

Donald Byrd chronology
2 Trumpets (1956)	The Young Bloods (1956)	Three Trumpets (1957)

The Young Bloods is an album by trumpeter Donald Byrd and saxophonist Phil Woods recorded in 1956 and released on the Prestige label.

== Reception ==
Professional ratings
Review scores
Source	Rating
Allmusic	4/5 stars
Disc	4/5 stars
The Penguin Guide to Jazz Recordings	2.5/4 stars

In his review for Allmusic, Scott Yanow stated: "this is an easily recommended release (despite its brief LP length) for straight-ahead jazz collectors".

== Track listing ==
All compositions by Phil Woods except as indicated

1. "Dewey Square" (Charlie Parker) - 7:49
2. "Dupeltook" - 6:46
3. "Once More" - 5:05
4. "House of Chan" - 5:52
5. "In Walked George" - 5:07
6. "Lover Man" (Jimmy Davis, Ram Ramirez, James Sherman) - 5:45

== Personnel ==
- Donald Byrd - trumpet
- Phil Woods - alto saxophone
- Al Haig - piano
- Teddy Kotick - bass
- Charlie Persip - drums
