= What's New? =

Song by Bob Crosby and His Orchestra, with vocals by Teddy Grace
- Published: 1939 by M. Witmark & Sons
- Genre: Pop
- Composer: Bob Haggart
- Lyricist: Johnny Burke

"What's New?" is a 1939 popular song composed by Bob Haggart, with lyrics by Johnny Burke. It was originally an instrumental tune titled "I'm Free," composed by Haggart in 1938 when he was performing with Bob Crosby and His Orchestra. The tune was written with a trumpet solo, meant to showcase the talents of band-mate Billy Butterfield. Crosby's orchestra recorded "I'm Free" the same day it was written.

The following year, the music publishers hired Johnny Burke to write lyrics for the tune. Burke's telling of the torch song is unique, using one side of a casual conversation between former lovers. Thus the song was retitled using the song's first line, "What's New?"

Bing Crosby recorded the song on June 30, 1939 with John Scott Trotter and His Orchestra and this was the biggest hit recording of the song, peaking at #2 during a 10-week stay in the charts. Other popular 1939 recordings of "What's New" include Hal Kemp and His Orchestra with vocalist Nan Wynn, which peaked at #11, and Benny Goodman and His Orchestra with vocalist Louise Tobin, which peaked at #7; Bob Crosby and His Orchestra re-recorded the song as "What's New," with vocalist Teddy Grace. Dexter Gordon regularly performed the song in the 1950s and 1960s. Peggy Lee covered the song on her 1957 album Dream Street.

"I'm Free" was "lyricized" again in the 1990s, this time by Catherine O'Brien, who also provided lyrics to the Haggart tune "My Inspiration." O'Brien's version, published in 1996, retains the original title, "I'm Free."

== Composition and structure ==
The song is in the form A1 – A1– A2 - A1. It was originally written in the key of C major and modulates to A♭ major and then F major to D♭ major for the bridge section before modulating back to C major. It begins on the tonic major, C major 7 before moving to a ♭VII (B♭ minor 7) in a II-V-I cadence in the key of A♭ major. That is replicated in the bridge section, going from F major 7 to E♭ minor 7 as part of a II-V-I cadence in the key of D♭ major.

== Linda Ronstadt recording ==
"What's New" was the title track of a triple platinum 1983 album by Linda Ronstadt, one of three recordings she released backed by The Nelson Riddle Orchestra. Linda's earnest version of the song, released as the album's first single, reached the Top 40 of the Cash Box Top 100 chart and peaked at #53 on the Billboard Hot 100. It achieved far greater success at Adult Contemporary radio, where it spent several weeks in the top five.

=== Chart performance ===
Chart (1983–1984)	Peak position
U.S. Billboard Adult Contemporary	5
US Billboard Hot 100	53

== Other notable recordings ==
- Billy Eckstine, 1950. National record
- Cannonball Adderley - Cannonball's Sharpshooters (1958)
- Louis Armstrong – Louis Armstrong Meets Oscar Peterson (1957)
- John Coltrane – Ballads (1963)
- Larry Coryell – Cedars of Avalon (2002)
- Bob Crosby – "I'm Free" – 1938
- Ella Fitzgerald – Like Someone In Love (1957)
- Dizzy Gillespie for the Live album The Dizzy Gillespie Big 7 (1975)
- Dexter Gordon – Our Man in Amsterdam (1969)
- Billie Holiday – Velvet Mood (1956)
- Helen Merrill – Helen Merrill (1954)
- Frank Sinatra – Frank Sinatra Sings for Only the Lonely (1958)
- Golden Gate Quartet (1939)
- Ahmad Jamal – At the Pershing: But Not for Me (1958)
