= Hod O'Brien =

American jazz musician

Walter Howard "Hod" O'Brien (January 19, 1936 – November 20, 2016) was an American jazz pianist.

O'Brien was born in Chicago. He attended the Hotchkiss School and then studied at the Oberlin Conservatory and the Manhattan School of Music (1954–1957). He began playing professionally in 1950, and substituted for Randy Weston in 1955. He led his own group in Lenox, Massachusetts during 1956–57, then joined Oscar Pettiford in 1957–58, and J.R. Monterose/Elvin Jones in 1958–59. Between 1960 and 1963, he played with Phil Woods, Freddie Hubbard, Charlie Rouse, and Lee Konitz. In 1964, he enrolled at Columbia University, where he studied mathematics and psychology, achieving his bachelor's degree in 1969; he then took a position in computer programming at New York University during 1969–1974, and studied computer music under Hall Overton and Charles Wuorinen.

O'Brien ran the St. James Infirmary jazz club in New York City in 1974–75, and played in the house band alongside Beaver Harris and Cameron Brown; this group accompanied Roswell Rudd, Sheila Jordan, Chet Baker, Zoot Sims, Al Cohn, Pepper Adams, and Archie Shepp, among others. He played with Marshall Brown (1975), Russell Procope and Sonny Greer (1977), Joe Puma (1977–1982, at Gregory's in New York City), saxophonist J.R. Monterose, and Stephanie Nakasian (1982). He later married Nakasian. (Their daughter is singer Veronica Swift.) He taught at Turtle Bay Music School 1972–1975, and in the 1990s at the University of Virginia.

Hod O'Brien continued playing actively while he underwent treatment for cancer. He died at the age of 80 on November 20, 2016.

== Discography ==
=== As leader ===
- I'm a Sucker Too (Silvertone)
- Bits and Pieces (Uptown, 1982)
- Opalessence (Criss Cross, 1985)
- Ridin' High (Reservoir, 1990)
- Hod & Cole (JazzMania, 1993)
- So That's How it Is (Reservoir, 1998)
- Fine and Dandy (Fresh Sound, 2004)
- Have Piano Will Swing (Fresh Sound, 2004)
- Live at Blues Alley, Sets 1–3 (Reservoir, 2005)

=== As sideman ===
With Ted Brown

- In Good Company (Criss Cross, 1985) with Jimmy Raney
- Free Spirit (Criss Cross, 1989)

With Chet Baker

- Blues for a Reason (Criss Cross Jazz, 1984)

With Art Farmer, Donald Byrd and Idrees Sulieman

- Three Trumpets (Prestige, 1957)

With Stephanie Nakasian

- Comin' Alive (1989)
- French Cookin' (1992)
- BitterSweet (1993)
- Invitation to an Escapade (2001)
- Lullaby in Rhythm: In Tribute to June Christy (2002)
- Thrush Hour: A Study of the Great Ladies of Jazz (2006)
- I Love You (2006)
- Dedicated to Lee Wiley (2009)

With Joe Puma

- Shining Hour (Reservoir 1984)

With Roswell Rudd

- Flexible Flyer (Arista/Freedom 1974)

With Rene Thomas

- Guitar Groove (Jazzland, 1960)

== Sources ==
- Leonard Feather and Ira Gitler, The Biographical Encyclopedia of Jazz. Oxford, 1999, p. 502.
