= The Stylings of Silver =

Studio album by the Horace Silver Quintet
- Released: 1957
- Recorded: May 8, 1957
- Studio: Van Gelder; Hackensack, New Jersey
- Genre: Jazz
- Length: 38:57
- Label: Blue Note; BLP 1562
- Producer: Alfred Lion

Horace Silver chronology
| 6 Pieces of Silver (1956) | The Stylings of Silver (1957) | Further Explorations (1958) |

The Stylings of Silver is an album by the Horace Silver Quintet recorded on May 8, 1957, and released on Blue Note Records later that year. The quintet features horn section Art Farmer and Hank Mobley and rhythm section Teddy Kotick and Louis Hayes.

== Reception ==
Professional ratings
Review scores
| Source | Rating |
|---|---|
| AllMusic | 3.5/5 stars |
| The Rolling Stone Jazz Record Guide | 5/5 stars |

The AllMusic review by Scott Yanow states, "All of Silver's Blue Note quintet recordings are consistently superb and swinging and, although not essential, this is a very enjoyable set."

== Track listing ==
All compositions by Horace Silver except as noted.

Side 1

1. "No Smokin'" – 5:33
2. "The Back Beat" – 6:23
3. "Soulville" – 6:16

Side 2

1. "Home Cookin'" – 6:28
2. "Metamorphosis" – 7:18
3. "My One and Only Love" (Robert Mellin, Guy Wood) – 6:59

== Personnel ==
Horace Silver Quintet

- Horace Silver – piano
- Art Farmer – trumpet
- Hank Mobley – tenor saxophone
- Teddy Kotick – bass
- Louis Hayes – drums

Technical personnel

- Alfred Lion – producer
- Rudy Van Gelder – recording engineer, mastering
- Reid Miles – design
- Francis Wolff – photography
- Nat Hentoff – liner notes
