= Impressions (Mal Waldron album) =

Studio album by Mal Waldron
- Released: 1959
- Recorded: March 20, 1959
- Studio: Van Gelder, Hackensack, New Jersey
- Genre: Jazz
- Length: 41:28
- Label: New Jazz

Mal Waldron chronology
Left Alone (1959)	Impressions (1959)	The Quest (1961)

Impressions is an album by American jazz pianist Mal Waldron, recorded in 1959 and released on the New Jazz label.

== Reception ==
A contemporaneous review by the New Pittsburgh Courier stated that it was Waldron's "best trio offering to date" and "definitely of five-star calibre"

The AllMusic review by Scott Yanow stated, "Waldron's brooding Monk-influenced style is heard in its early prime on this excellent release".

Professional ratings
Review scores
Source	Rating
AllMusic	4/5 stars
New Pittsburgh Courier	5/5 stars
The Penguin Guide to Jazz Recordings	4/4 stars

== Track listing ==
All compositions by Mal Waldron except as indicated

1. "Les Champs Elysées" – 6:22
2. "C'est Formidable" – 4:04
3. "Ciao" – 9:55
4. "You Stepped Out of a Dream" (Nacio Herb Brown, Gus Kahn) – 5:47
5. "All the Way" (Sammy Cahn, Jimmy Van Heusen) – 6:38
6. "All About Us" (Elaine Waldron) – 5:02
7. "With a Song in My Heart" (Lorenz Hart, Richard Rodgers) – 3:40

== Personnel ==
- Mal Waldron – piano
- Addison Farmer – bass
- Albert Heath – drums
