= The Dual Role of Bob Brookmeyer =

Studio album by Bob Brookmeyer
- Released: 1956
- Recorded: January 6, 1954, and June 30, 1955
- Studio: New York City and Van Gelder Studio, Hackensack, New Jersey
- Genre: Jazz
- Length: 30:28
- Label: Prestige; PRLP 7066
- Producer: Bob Weinstock

Bob Brookmeyer chronology
| Bob Brookmeyer Plays Bob Brookmeyer and Some Others (1955) | The Dual Role of Bob Brookmeyer (1956) | Tonite's Music Today (1956) |

The Dual Role of Bob Brookmeyer is an album by jazz trombonist and pianist Bob Brookmeyer recorded in 1954 and 1955 for the Prestige label.

== Reception ==
Professional ratings
Review scores
| Source | Rating |
|---|---|
| Allmusic | 3/5 stars |
| The Penguin Guide to Jazz Recordings | 3.5/4 stars |

The Allmusic review by Scott Yanow stated: "Although the overall set is not all that essential, the music is pleasing and reasonably creative".

== Track listing ==
All compositions by Bob Brookmeyer except as indicated

1. "Rocky Scotch" – 4:40
2. "Under the Lilacs" – 5:07
3. "They Say It's Wonderful" (Irving Berlin) – 5:49
4. "Potrezebie" (Jimmy Raney) – 4:49
5. "Revelation" (Gerry Mulligan) – 5:46
6. "Star Eyes" (Gene de Paul, Don Raye) – 4:29
7. "Nobody's Heart" (Lorenz Hart, Richard Rodgers) – 4:25
8. "Loup-Garou" (Teddy Charles) – 4:38
- Recorded in New York City on January 6, 1954 (tracks 5–8) and at Van Gelder Studio in Hackensack, New Jersey on June 30, 1955 (tracks 1–4)

== Personnel ==
- Bob Brookmeyer – valve trombone, piano
- Jimmy Raney – guitar (tracks 1–4)
- Teddy Charles – vibraphone (tracks 5–8)
- Teddy Kotick – bass
- Mel Lewis (tracks 1–4), Ed Shaughnessy (tracks 5–8) – drums
- Nancy Overton – vocals (track 7)
