= Further Explorations =

Album by Horace Silver

Further Explorations by the Horace Silver Quintet

Studio album by the Horace Silver Quintet
- Released: Early May 1958
- Recorded: January 13, 1958
- Studio: Van Gelder; Hackensack, NJ
- Genre: Jazz
- Length: 42:20
- Label: Blue Note; BLP 1589
- Producer: Alfred Lion

Horace Silver chronology
The Stylings of Silver (1957)	Further Explorations by the Horace Silver Quintet (1958)	Finger Poppin' (1959)

Further Explorations by the Horace Silver Quintet is an album by American jazz pianist Horace Silver, recorded on January 13, 1958, and released on Blue Note Records in 1958. The quintet features horn section Art Farmer and Clifford Jordan and rhythm section Teddy Kotick and Louis Hayes.

== Background ==
Silver's tune "Safari" had been recorded by Blue Note before in 1952 and was re-issued as a single to coincide with the release of the album.

== Reception ==
Professional ratings
Review scores
Source	Rating
AllMusic	4/5 stars
The Penguin Guide to Jazz	3.5/4 stars

The AllMusic review by Steve Leggett states: "Further Explorations is a solid, even striking outing, and if it isn't maybe quite as flashy as some of its predecessors, it is no less substantive and revealing."

== Track listing ==
All tracks are written by Horace Silver, except as noted.

Side 1
No.	Title	Length
1.	"The Outlaw"	6:07
2.	"Melancholy Mood"	6:35
3.	"Pyramid"	6:38

Side 2
No.	Title	Writer(s)	Length
1.	"Moon Rays"		10:56
2.	"Safari"		5:11
3.	"Ill Wind"	Harold Arlen; Ted Koehler	6:53

== Personnel ==
Horace Silver Quintet

- Horace Silver – piano
- Art Farmer – trumpet (except "Melancholy Mood")
- Clifford Jordan – tenor saxophone (except "Melancholy Mood")
- Teddy Kotick – bass
- Louis Hayes – drums

Technical personnel

- Alfred Lion – production
- Rudy Van Gelder – recording engineer
- Reid Miles – design
- Francis Wolff – photography
