= Thrush Hour: A Study of the Great Ladies of Jazz =

Studio album by Stephanie Nakasian
- Released: July 18, 2006
- Recorded: September 9–10, 2004; Red Rock Recording Studio; Saylorsburg, Pennsylvania
- Genre: Jazz
- Length: 66:47
- Label: V.S.O.P. Records
- Producer: Stephanie Nakasian

Stephanie Nakasian chronology
Lullaby in Rhythm: In Tribute to June Christy (2002)	Thrush Hour: A Study of the Great Ladies of Jazz (2006)	I Love You (2006)

Professional ratings
Review scores
Source	Rating
All About Jazz	4/5 stars
All About Jazz	5/5 stars
JazzTimes	1/5 stars

Thrush Hour: A Study of the Great Ladies of Jazz is Stephanie Nakasian's sixth album as leader. It was released in 2006.

The album features Nakasian paying tribute to twenty of jazz's great female singers. Nakasian's intention, as stated in the liner notes, is to emulate and mimic their styles and inflections in order to bring a sense of authenticity back to vocal jazz.

The extensive liner notes include a short biography of each singer as well as Nakasian's description of how she endeavors to achieve their unique sound.

All of the arrangements were taken from the originals and prepared by Nakasian and Hod O'Brien.

== Track listing ==
#	Title	Emulating	Writers	Time
1.	"A Good Man Is Hard to Find"	Bessie Smith	Eddie Green	3:43
2.	"Guess Who's In Town"	Ethel Waters	James P. Johnson, Andy Razaf	2:48
3.	"Rockin' Chair"	Mildred Bailey	Hoagy Carmichael	3:32
4.	"A Hundred Years from Today"	Lee Wiley	Victor Young, Ned Washington, Joe Young	3:46
5.	"It Don't Mean A Thing"	Ivie Anderson	Duke Ellington, Irving Mills	3:06
6.	"Lullaby of the Leaves"	Connee Boswell	Bernice Petkere, Joe Young	3:35
7.	"Goody Goody"	Helen Ward	Matty Malneck, Johnny Mercer	2:24
8.	"All of Me"	Billie Holiday	Gerald Marks, Seymour Simons	2:44
9.	"What is This Thing Called Love?"	Anita O'Day	Cole Porter	2:40
10.	"Moments Like This"	Peggy Lee	Frank Loesser, Burton Lane	3:35
11.	"Take the 'A' Train"	Betty Roche	Billy Strayhorn	2:40
12.	"Million Dollar Secret"	Helen Humes	Helen Humes, Jules Taub	3:52
13.	"Day Dream"	Sarah Vaughan	Duke Ellington, Billy Strayhorn, John Latouche	4:42
14.	"I Cried For You"	Carmen McRae	Arthur Freed, Gus Arnheim, Abe Lyman	2:20
15.	"Maybe"	Lena Horne	Billy Strayhorn	2:50
16.	"Too Late Now"	Shirley Horn	Alan Jay Lerner, Burton Lane	4:28
17.	"Peel Me A Grape"	Blossom Dearie	Dave Frishberg	2:38
18.	"Blue Gardenia"	Dinah Washington	Bob Russell, Lester Lee	4:41
19.	"Street of Dreams"	Abbey Lincoln	Sam M. Lewis, Victor Young	3:58
20.	"All That Jazz"	Ella Fitzgerald	Benny Carter, Al Stillman	3:22

== Personnel ==
Performers

- Stephanie Nakasian - vocals
- Hod O'Brien - piano
- Randy Sandke - trumpet
- Tom Hamilton - tenor saxophone
- John Jensen - trombone
- Howie Collins - rhythm guitar
- Steve Gillmore - bass
- Bill Goodwin - drums

Other Personnel

- Session Producer - Stephanie Nakasian
- Engineer - Kent Heckman
- Editing and Mastering - Bill Goodwin
- Liner Notes - Scott Yanow, Stephanie Nakasian
- Photos - Stephen Poffenberger, The Wayne Knight Collection, Cynthia Sesso
- Booklet Design - Mario Levesque
