= Pairing Off =

Studio album by Phil Woods Septet
- Released: 1956
- Recorded: June 15, 1956
- Studios: Van Gelder Studio, Hackensack, New Jersey
- Genre: Hard bop
- Length: 44:35
- Labels: Prestige; PRLP 7046
- Producer: Bob Weinstock

Phil Woods chronology
Woodlore (1955)	Pairing Off (1956)	The Young Bloods (1956)

Pairing Off is an album by American jazz saxophonist Phil Woods' Septet recorded in 1956 and released on Prestige.

== Reception ==
Professional ratings
Review scores
Source	Rating
AllMusic	4/5 stars
The Rolling Stone Jazz Record Guide	4/5 stars
The Penguin Guide to Jazz Recordings	3/4 stars

In his review for AllMusic, Scott Yanow stated "The full group stretches out on four lengthy numbers".

== Track listing ==
All compositions by Phil Woods except as indicated

1. "The Stanley Stomper" - 14:20
2. "Cool Aid" - 9:47
3. "Pairing Off" - 12:15
4. "Suddenly It's Spring" (Johnny Burke, Jimmy Van Heusen) - 8:22

== Personnel ==
- Phil Woods, Gene Quill - alto saxophone
- Donald Byrd, Kenny Dorham - trumpet
- Tommy Flanagan - piano
- Doug Watkins - bass
- Philly Joe Jones - drums
