= Julian "Cannonball" Adderley (album) =

Studio album by Cannonball Adderley
- Released: 1955
- Recorded: July 21, 29 & August 5, 1955
- Genre: Jazz
- Length: 70:05
- Label: EmArcy
- Producer: Ken Druker, Bryan Koniarz, Bob Shad

Cannonball Adderley chronology
Presenting Cannonball Adderley (1955)	Julian "Cannonball" Adderley (1955)	Julian Cannonball Adderley and Strings (1955)

Julian "Cannonball" Adderley is the second album by jazz saxophonist Cannonball Adderley, and his first released on the EmArcy label, featuring an octet with Nat Adderley, Jerome Richardson, Cecil Payne, John Williams, Paul Chambers, Jimmy Cleveland or J. J. Johnson, and Kenny Clarke or Max Roach arranged by Quincy Jones.

== Reception ==
The AllMusic review by Michael G. Nastos states "Nothing on the album screams as a standout, but there's an even-keeled consonance that is very enjoyable, and lingers to the point where you want to listen again and again. That enduring quality makes this recording special, and set the bar high for what Adderley would produce through a long and fruitful career as a jazz master. This album is the seed for that field of flowers". The Penguin Guide to Jazz gave the album a three star rating saying "the confidence and brio is already in place and seemingly unstoppable".

Professional ratings
Review scores
Source	Rating
AllMusic	3.5/5 stars
The Penguin Guide to Jazz	3/4 stars

== Track listing ==
All compositions by Julian "Cannonball" Adderley except as indicated

1. "Cannonball" - 4:17
2. "Willows" (Quincy Jones) - 4:59
3. "Everglade" (Adderley, Jones) - 3:44
4. "Cynthia's in Love" (Billy Gish, Jack Owens, Earl White) - 3:07
5. "The Song Is You" (Oscar Hammerstein II, Jerome Kern) - 4:16
6. "Hurricane Connie" (Jones) - 4:18
7. "Purple Shades" (Phil S. Dooley, Lew Douglas, Frank LaVere) - 3:34
8. "Rose Room" (Art Hickman, Harry Williams) - 5:49
9. "Fallen Feathers" (Jones) - 3:48
10. "You'd Be So Nice to Come Home To" (Cole Porter) - 3:36

- Recorded in New York City on July 21 (tracks 4–7), July 29 (tracks 1, 3 & 10), and August 5 (tracks 2 & 8–9), 1955

== Personnel ==
- Cannonball Adderley - alto saxophone
- Jerome Richardson - tenor saxophone & flute
- Cecil Payne - baritone saxophone
- Nat Adderley – cornet
- J. J. Johnson - (tracks 1–3 & 8–10) - trombone
- Jimmy Cleveland - (tracks 4–7) - trombone
- John Williams - piano
- Paul Chambers - bass
- Kenny Clarke - (tracks 1, 3, 4–7 & 10) - drums
- Max Roach - (tracks 2 & 8–9) - drums
- Quincy Jones - arranger
