= Left Alone (Mal Waldron album) =

Studio album by Mal Waldron
- Released: 1959
- Recorded: February 24, 1959
- Genre: Jazz
- Length: 38:11
- Label: Bethlehem
- Producer: Teddy Charles

Mal Waldron chronology
Mal/4: Trio (1958)	Left Alone (1959)	Impressions (1959)

Left Alone is an album by American jazz pianist Mal Waldron, recorded in 1959 and released on the Bethlehem label.

"Left Alone" is Waldron's signature song. He released an album of a similar title, Left Alone Live 1 (Fontana Records). It was recorded in Japan in 1971 and features Isao Suzuki (b) / Yoshiyuki Nakamura (dms) / Kohsuke Mine (sax). West 54 Records released the album on LP in 1980 as Left Alone: Mal Waldron Live.

The tracks "Left Alone" and "Catwalk" were released as two sides of a single; both were given four-star reviews by Billboard.

== Reception ==
The AllMusic review by Scott Yanow stated: "Although Waldron dedicated the album to Lady Day and talks about her a bit on the last track in a short interview with vibraphonist Teddy Charles (which was recorded a bit later), he actually only performs one song from her repertoire... McLean's emotional alto is such a strong asset on the title cut that one wishes he were on the rest of this worthwhile set."

John S. Wilson assigned 4 stars to the release in his DownBeat review. He singles out "Left Alone", "Minor Pulsation", "Catwalk", and "Airegin" as highlights.

Professional ratings
Review scores
Source	Rating
AllMusic	3/5 stars
DownBeat	4/5 stars

== Track listing ==
All compositions by Mal Waldron except as indicated

1. "Left Alone" (Billie Holiday, Mal Waldron) – 6:06
2. "Catwalk" (Mal Waldron) – 6:56
3. "You Don't Know What Love Is" (Gene de Paul, Don Raye) – 5:52
4. "Minor Pulsation" (Mal Waldron) – 8:14
5. "Airegin" (Sonny Rollins) – 7:11
6. Mal Waldron Interview: The Way He Remembers Billie Holiday – 4:09

- Recorded in New York City on February 24, 1959.

== Personnel ==
- Mal Waldron – piano
- Jackie McLean – alto saxophone (track 1)
- Julian Euell – bass
- Al Dreares – drums
