= The Aztec Suite =

Studio album by Art Farmer
- Released: 1959
- Recorded: November 1959; Webster Hall, New York City
- Genre: Jazz
- Length: 33:31
- Labels: United Artists; UAL 4082
- Producer: Jack Lewis

Art Farmer chronology
Brass Shout (1959)	The Aztec Suite (1959)	Meet the Jazztet (1960)

Professional ratings
Review scores
Source	Rating
Allmusic	3/5 stars
DownBeat	3/5 stars

The Aztec Suite is an album by trumpeter Art Farmer featuring performances arranged by Chico O'Farrill recorded in 1959 and originally released on the United Artists label.

== Reception ==
The Allmusic review stated: "In spite of the assurances of the uncredited liner notes author who states that "since its introduction, it has become a jazz classic," this suite sounds uneven and rather dated".

== Track listing ==
1. "The Aztec Suite" (Chico O'Farrill) - 16:24
2. "Heat Wave" (Irving Berlin) - 3:35
3. "Deliro" (Felipe Domínguez) - 2:50
4. "Woody 'N You" (Dizzy Gillespie) - 3:14
5. "Drume Negrita" (Eliseo Grenet) - 3:07
6. "Alone Together" (Howard Dietz, Arthur Schwartz) - 4:21

== Personnel ==
- Art Farmer, Bernie Glow, Nick Travis - trumpet
- Jimmy Cleveland, Frank Rehak - trombone
- Jim Buffington - French horn
- Zoot Sims, Seldon Powell - tenor saxophone
- Hank Jones - piano
- Addison Farmer - bass
- Charlie Persip - drums
- José Mangual - percussion
- Chico O'Farrill - arranger
- Al Cohn - conductor
