= The Heathertones =

American singer, songwriter, actress

The Heathertones vocal quartet took form in 1946 with members Nancy Swain Overton, her sister Jean Swain, Bix Brent and Pauli Skindlov. Jean and Bix were both graduates of Smith College, while Nancy and Pauli had completed their studies at Juilliard. Pauli was replaced by Ellie Decker whose lead spot was eventually filled by Marianne McCormick for six of the seven years the group was together.

They wrote all their own vocal arrangements and band lead sheets. Among their many recordings were those with Benny Goodman, Buddy Greco and Tommy Dorsey. They appeared regularly on network TV with Frank Sinatra, Bert Parks and others, always involved with the skits, live commercials, etc. typical of TV shows of that era. The group disbanded in 1953.

Three recordings they made on October 27, 1949 with Buddy Greco and the Benny Goodman orchestra are available on a cd recording "Benny Goodman: 1949-1951". The songs are "Brother Bill", "Spin a Record" and "You're Always There".
