= Nightwings (Stanley Turrentine album) =

Studio album by Stanley Turrentine
- Released: 1977
- Recorded: June–July, 1977 in New York City
- Genre: Jazz
- Label: Fantasy F 9534
- Producer: Stanley Turrentine

Stanley Turrentine chronology
The Man with the Sad Face (1976)	Nightwings (1977)	West Side Highway (1977)

Nightwings is an album by jazz saxophonist Stanley Turrentine. It was recorded for the Fantasy label in 1977 and features performances by Turrentine with an orchestra arranged and conducted by Claus Ogerman.

== Reception ==
The AllMusic review by Michael Erlewine simply stated: "Large group session for Fantasy".

Professional ratings
Review scores
Source	Rating
AllMusic	2/5 stars
The Rolling Stone Jazz Record Guide	3/5 stars

== Track listing ==
1. "Papa "T"" (Stanley Turrentine) - 7:23
2. "If You Don't Believe" (Clarence McDonald, Deniece Williams, Fritz Baskett) - 5:48
3. "Joao" (Tommy Turrentine) - 3:40
4. "Birdland" (Joe Zawinul) - 5:54
5. "There's Music In the Air" (Caiphus Semenya, Will Jennings) - 4:14
6. "Nightwings" (Claus Ogerman) - 3:49
7. "Don't Give Up On Us" (Ogerman) - 5:19

== Personnel ==
- Stanley Turrentine - tenor saxophone
- Randy Brecker, John Faddis, Earl Gardner, Alan Rubin, Lew Soloff - trumpet, flugelhorn
- Paul Faulise, Urbie Green, Dave Taylor - trombone
- Brooks Tillotson - French horn
- Jerome Ashby, Jim Buffington, John Clark, Don Corrado, Joseph De Angelis, Fred Griffen, Margaret Reill - French horn
- Don Butterfield, Tony Price - tuba
- Phil Bodner, Kenneth Harris, Hubert Laws, George Marge - flute
- Paul Griffin - keyboards
- Eric Gale, Lloyd Davis, Cornell Dupree - guitar
- Ron Carter - bass
- Gary King - electric bass
- Charles Collins - drums
- Errol "Crusher" Bennett - percussion
- Unnamed String Section
- Sanford Allen - concertmaster
- Claus Ogerman - arranger, conductor
