= Jerry Segal =

American jazz musician

Gerald "Jerry" Segal (February 16, 1931 – August 1974) was an American jazz drummer.

Segal was born and raised in Philadelphia, where he worked with Bennie Green and Pete Rugolo in local clubs. In the late 1950s he played with Johnny Smith, Terry Gibbs, Teddy Charles, Stan Getz, Charles Mingus, Herbie Mann, Lennie Tristano, Bob Dorough, Teo Macero, Curtis Fuller, Hampton Hawes, Dick Cary, Mal Waldron, Addison Farmer, the Australian Jazz Quintet, and Mose Allison.

He also played with Bernard Peiffer from 1958 to 1960 and with the composer Edgar Varese in the 1950s. He worked in 1960 with Dave McKenna. Raising his children, Jerry and Josylyn Segal, he was primarily the big act "show drummer" for the honeymoon resort, Mount Airy Lodge, in the Poconos through the 60's.
