= Teddy Grace =

American jazz musician

- Born: Stella Gloria Crowson; June 26, 1905; Arcadia, Louisiana, U.S.
- Died: January 4, 1992 (age 86); La Mirada, California, U.S.
- Other name: Stella Maple
- Occupation: Singer

Teddy Grace (born Stella Gloria Crowson, June 26, 1905 – January 4, 1992) was an American female jazz singer.

== Big bands ==
Grace first sang professionally in 1931. She sang on radio in the American South and worked with the bands of Bob Crosby, Paul Whiteman, Al Katz (1933), Tommy Christian (1934), and Mal Hallett (1934–37).

== Recording ==
From 1937 to 1940, Grace recorded for Decca Records, and her sidemen on these recordings included Bobby Hackett, Jack Teagarden, Charlie Shavers, Buster Bailey, Pee Wee Russell, Bob Crosby and His Orchestra, and Bud Freeman.

== Military service ==
Grace left the music industry in 1940 and joined the WACs a short time later, where she sang at war bond rallies and other political events. Grace lost her voice as a result of these activities. She was unable to speak for years and was never again able to sing.

Twenty-two of the 30 sides Grace recorded for Decca were reissued on CD by Timeless Records in 1996. Another 26 of her sides with Mal Hallett and Bob Crosby were released by Hep Records in 1997.
