= Art Mardigan =

American jazz drummer (1923–1977)

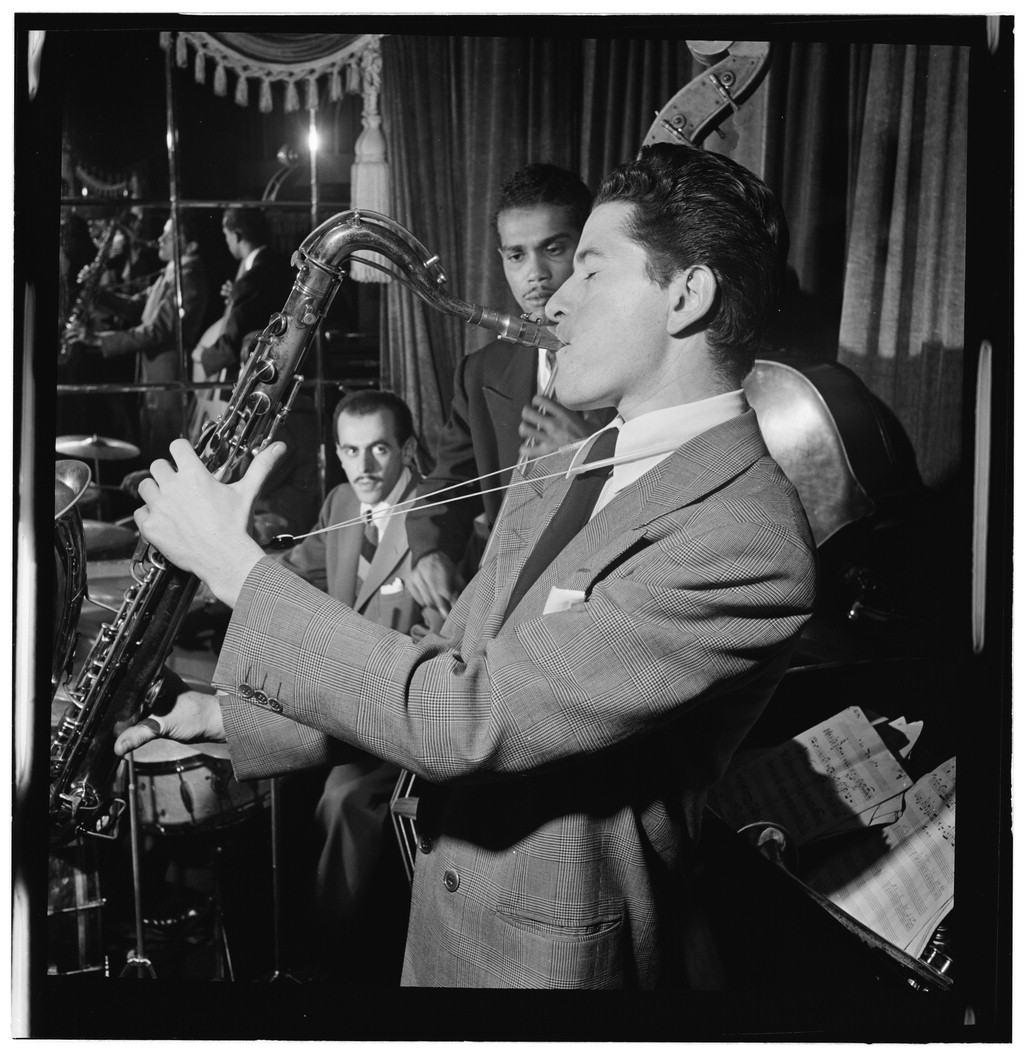
- Mardigan at Club 18, New York City, c. November 1947; by William P. Gottlieb

Background information
- Born: Art Mardigian; February 12, 1923; Detroit, Michigan, U.S.
- Died: June 6, 1977 (aged 54) Detroit, Michigan, U.S.
- Genres: Jazz
- Occupation: Musician
- Instrument: Drums
- Years active: 1945–1977
- Formerly of: Woody Herman Herd; Al Cohn; Stan Getz

Art Mardigian (February 12, 1923 – June 6, 1977), better known as Art Mardigan, was an American jazz drummer.

== Biography ==
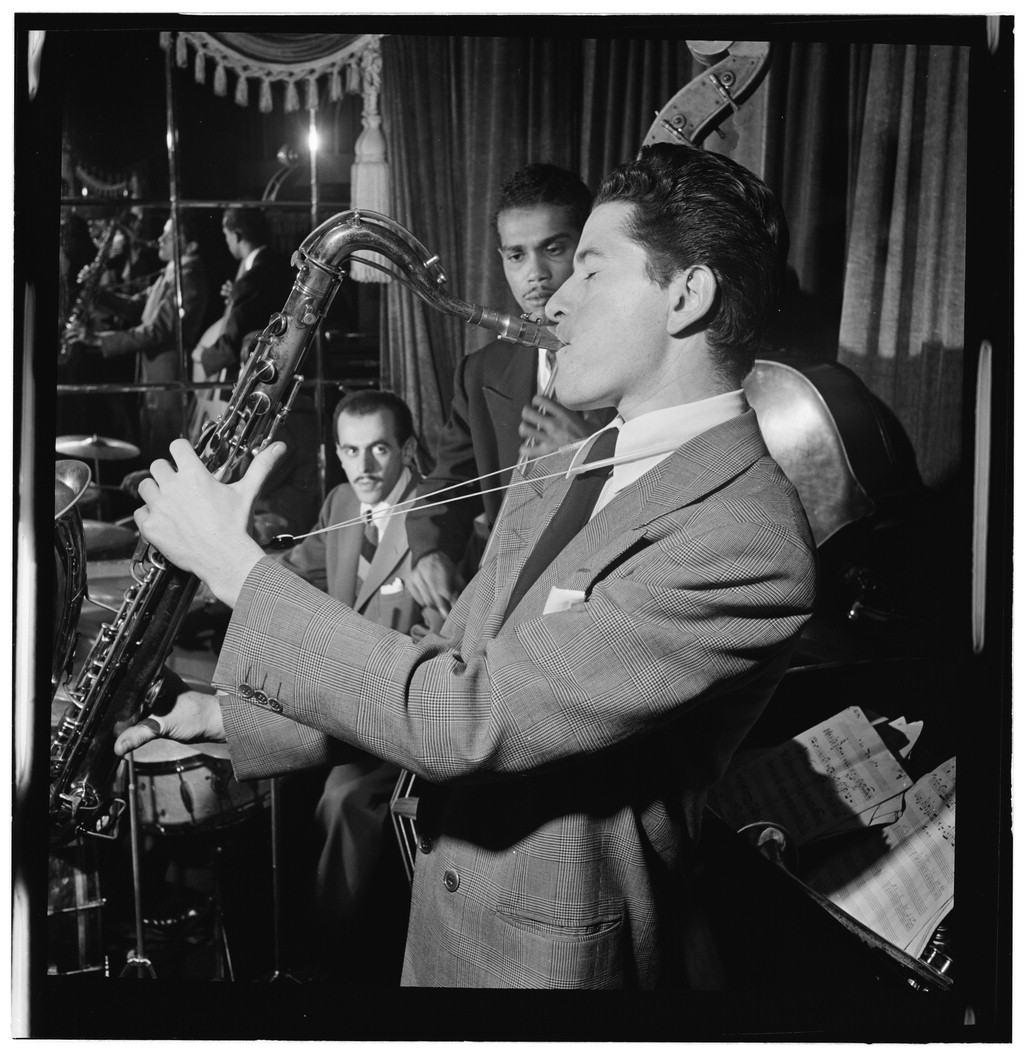
Mardigan (left) with bassist Curly Russell and saxophonist Allen Eager at Club 18, New York City, c. November 1947

Mardigan played with Tommy Reynolds in 1942 and served in the U.S. Army in 1943–44. After his discharge, he worked extensively in the New York City jazz scene, playing and recording with Georgie Auld, Charlie Parker, Allen Eager, Dexter Gordon, Kai Winding, Wardell Gray, and Fats Navarro, among others.

In 1948, he was hired by Phil Hill to join his bebop trio, with Abe Woodly on vibraphone, as the first house band at the Blue Bird Inn jazz club in Detroit. The following year, Hill and Mardigan were joined by Wardell Gray, James "Beans" Richardson on bass, and Jack Tiant on bongos, and, as the Phil Hill Quintet, recorded a live album on July 20, 1949. The following April, the Wardell Gray Quartet, with Hill, Richardson, and Mardigan, recorded for Prestige Records.

In the 1950s, Mardigan toured with Woody Herman and Pete Rugolo; he recorded as a leader of a sextet which included Al Cohn in 1954 for The Jazz School. He recorded with Stan Getz in 1954 and then moved back to his birthplace of Detroit. There, he played with Jack Brokensha in 1963 and also worked at the Roostertail nightclub in the Johnny Trudell band, though returned to work with Getz near the end of his life.

== Discography ==
=== As co-leader ===
- Bill DeArango, Renditions (EmArcy, 1987)
- Clark Terry, Paul Gonsalves, and Joe Gordon, The Jazz School (Wing, 1955)

=== As sideman ===
- Georgie Auld, Handicap (Musicraft, 1990)
- Eddie Bert, Kaleidoscope (Savoy, 1987)
- Jack Brokensha, And Then I Said (Savoy, 1963)
- Chris Connor, Sings Lullabys of Birdland (Bethlehem, 1956)
- Stan Getz, At the Shrine (Norgran, 1955)
- Jimmy Giuffre, Bob Cooper, Harry Klee, Bob Enevoldsen, and Marty Paich, Tenors West (GNP, 1956)
- Woody Herman, Hey! Heard the Herd? (Verve, 1963)
- Woody Herman, The Third Herd Vol. 1 (Discovery, 1981)
- Pete Jolly, Duo, Trio, Quartet (RCA Victor, 1955)
- Jimmy Raney, A (Prestige, 1958)
- Jimmy Rowles, Rare But Well Done (Liberty, 1954)
- Nick Travis, The Panic Is On (RCA Victor, 1954)
