= Addison Farmer =

American jazz musician (1928–1963)

Addison Gerald Farmer (August 21, 1928, Council Bluffs, Iowa – February 20, 1963, New York City) was an American jazz bassist. He was the twin brother of Art Farmer.

== Early life ==
Farmer was born an hour after his twin brother, on August 21, 1928, in Council Bluffs, Iowa, reportedly at 2201 Fourth Avenue. Their parents, James Arthur Farmer and Hazel Stewart Farmer, divorced when the boys were four, and their steelworker father was killed in a work accident not long after this. Addison moved with his grandfather, grandmother, mother, brother and sister to Phoenix, Arizona when he was still four.

Farmer and his brother moved to Los Angeles in 1945, attending the music-oriented Jefferson High School, where they gained music instruction and met other developing musicians such as Sonny Criss, Ernie Andrews, Big Jay McNeely and Ed Thigpen. The brothers earned money by working in a cold-storage warehouse and by playing professionally.

He took bass lessons from Frederick Zimmermann, and studied at Juilliard and the Manhattan School of Music.

== Career ==
By late 1945, Farmer was with Johnny Alston and His Orchestra recording for the Bihari Brothers' Modern Music label, backing Jeanne Demetz and, shortly after, on the Blue Moon label. Other band members for those recording dates included Al "Cake" Wichard and King Fleming. He later recorded with Teddy Edwards's band. Farmer played in several groups with his brother, including in ensembles led by Benny Golson and Gigi Gryce. He also played with Mose Allison, Jay McShann, Charlie Parker, and Miles Davis. He recorded extensively for Prestige Records.

Farmer died from sudden unexpected death syndrome on February 20, 1963, in New York City at the age of 34.

== Discography ==
=== As sideman ===
With Mose Allison

- Local Color (Prestige, 1958) – rec. 1957
- Young Man Mose (Prestige, 1958)
- Ramblin' with Mose (Prestige, 1958)
- Creek Bank (Prestige, 1958)
- Autumn Song (Prestige, 1959)
- I Don't Worry About a Thing (Atlantic, 1962)
- Swingin' Machine (Atlantic, 1963)
- Down Home Piano (Prestige, 1965)

With Gene Ammons

- All Star Sessions (Prestige, 1956) – rec. 1950–55
- The Happy Blues (Prestige, 1956)

With Teddy Charles

- Word from Bird (Atlantic, 1957)
- Coolin' (New Jazz, 1957)
- The Prestige Jazz Quartet (Prestige, 1957)
- Jazz In The Garden At The Museum Of Modern Art (Warwick, 1960)

With Art Farmer

- Early Art (New Jazz, 1954)
- When Farmer Met Gryce (Prestige, 1955) – rec. 1954–55
- Art Farmer Quintet featuring Gigi Gryce (Prestige, 1955)
- Bennie Green with Art Farmer (Prestige, 1956)
- Farmer's Market (Prestige, 1956)
- Three Trumpets with Donald Byrd and Idrees Sulieman (Prestige, 1957)
- Last Night When We Were Young (ABC-Paramount, 1957)
- Portrait of Art Farmer (Contemporary, 1958)
- Modern Art (United Artists, 1958)
- The Aztec Suite (United Artists, 1959)
- Meet the Jazztet with Benny Golson (Argo, 1960)

With Mal Waldron

- Mal/4: Trio (New Jazz, 1958)
- Impressions (New Jazz, 1959)

With others

- Bob Brookmeyer,Kansas City Revisited (United Artists, 1958)
- Sonny Criss, California Boppin' (Fresh Sound, 1957)
- Teddy Edwards, Steady with Teddy (Cool & Blue, 2005) – rec. 1947
- Curtis Fuller and Hampton Hawes, Curtis Fuller and Hampton Hawes with French Horns (Status, 1962) – rec. 1957
- Stan Getz, The Soft Swing (Verve, 1957)
- Teo Macero, Teo with the Prestige Jazz Quartet (Prestige, 1957)
- Sahib Shihab, The Jazz We Heard Last Summer (Savoy, 1957)
