= Stephanie Nakasian =

American singer

- Born: Patricia Stephanie Nakasian; August 29, 1954; Washington, D.C., United States
- Genres: Vocal jazz, swing
- Occupations: Singer, educator
- Labels: V.S.O.P., JazzMania, Chase Music Group
- Website: www.stephanienakasian.com

Stephanie Nakasian (born August 29, 1954) is an American jazz vocalist and voice teacher.

== Biography ==
=== Early life ===
Born in Washington, D.C., Nakasian grew up in Bronxville, New York. She studied classical piano and violin, sang in choirs, and studied voice. She majored in economics at Northwestern University, where she received her BA and MBA. She subsequently worked as a financial consultant to major banks in New York and Chicago until 1981, when she began working as a musician full-time.

=== Musical career ===
Nakasian first came to international attention when she sang and toured from 1983 to 1984 with Jon Hendricks and Company. She has since toured and recorded as a leader and with pianist Hod O'Brien, her partner since 1980.

She has appeared frequently as a guest artist with the Jim Cullum Jazz Band on their internationally syndicated public radio show, Riverwalk Jazz, to portray a variety of jazz singers. More recently, Nakasian portrayed herself on the show with Dick Hyman for tributes to composers Hoagy Carmichael and Walter Donaldson. She appears at international festivals and national music education conferences including the MENC, MTNA, and IAJE nationals. She has appeared in concerts as a featured performer alongside important figures in jazz, including Urbie Green, Pat Metheny, Clark Terry, Scott Hamilton, Hank Jones, Roy Haynes, Philly Joe Jones, and Annie Ross. She also tours regularly.

=== Teaching ===
Nakasian currently teaches voice at the University of Virginia in Charlottesville, Virginia and the College of William and Mary in Williamsburg, Virginia. She has directed vocal jazz ensembles and gives numerous workshops each year to schools and conventions (including the Virginia Music Educators annual convention and at Virginia Commonwealth University in Richmond) on "Teaching Jazz Voice," "Coaching Jazz and Show Choirs on Jazz," and "How to Sing what's NOT on the Page."

Nakasian is also the author of the vocal jazz instruction manual, It's Not on the Page! How to Integrate Jazz and Jazz Rhythm into Choral and Solo Repertoire, which was published in 2001.

=== Personal life ===
Nakasian was married to pianist Hod O'Brien. She is the mother of singer Veronica Swift.

== Discography ==
=== As leader ===
- Comin' Alive (V.S.O.P, 1989)
- French Cookin' (V.S.O.P, 1992)
- BitterSweet (Jazz Mania, 1993)
- Invitation to an Escapade (Chase, 2001)
- Lullaby in Rhythm: In Tribute to June Christy (V.S.O.P, 2002)
- Thrush Hour: A Study of the Great Ladies of Jazz (V.S.O.P., 2006)
- I Love You (Spice of Life, 2006)
- The Classic Songs of Billie Holiday (Pocket Songs, 2009)
- Dedicated to Lee Wiley (Classic Jazz, 2009)
- Show Me the Way (Capri, 2012)

=== As guest ===
- Bob Dorough, This is a Recording (Laissez-Faire, 1991)
- Hod O'Brien, It Don't Mean a Thing (Spice of Life, 2011)
- Sal Soghoian, To Be with You (1993)
