= Don Butterfield =

American tuba player

- Born: Don Kiethly Butterfield; April 1, 1923
- Origin: Centralia, Washington, US
- Died: November 27, 2006 (aged 83) Cedar Grove, New Jersey, US
- Genres: Jazz, classical
- Occupation: Musician
- Instrument: Tuba
- Years active: 1940s–2005
- Label: Atlantic

Don Kiethly Butterfield (April 1, 1923 – November 27, 2006) was an American jazz and classical tuba player.

== Biography ==
Butterfield began to play the tuba in high school. He wanted to play trumpet, but the band director assigned him to tuba instead. He joined the United States Army Air Forces and reached the rank of technician fifth grade. After serving in the U.S. Military from 1942 to 1946, he studied the instrument at the Juilliard School.

Butterfield started his professional career in the late 1940s playing for the CBS and NBC radio networks. He played in orchestras, including the American Symphony, on albums by Jackie Gleason until he became a full time member at the Radio City Music Hall.

In the 1950s, Butterfield switched to jazz, backing such musicians as Dizzy Gillespie, Frank Sinatra, Charles Mingus, Rahsaan Roland Kirk, Jimmy Smith, and Moondog. He led his own sextet for a 1955 album on Atlantic Records and played at the 1958 Newport Jazz Festival.

In the 1970s, he worked as a session musician. He played on recordings for a variety of artists and on television and film soundtracks, including The Godfather Part II.

The Grove Dictionary of Music calls Butterfield's playing style, "uncommonly florid, a skill that made him of value as a jazz musician... He was one of the first modern jazz players who, rather than simply marking out the bass line, rediscovered the possibility of bringing to the instrument a facility akin to that of a trumpeter."

Butterfield played an 8-foot-long trumpet on the May 21, 1962 episode of the I've Got a Secret television program (season 10, episode 519).^{video}

Butterfield suffered a stroke in 2005, which left him unable to play, and he died in 2006 from a stroke-related illness.

== Discography ==
=== As sideman ===
With Cannonball Adderley

- African Waltz (Riverside, 1961)
- Domination (Capitol, 1965)

With Nat Adderley

- Autobiography (Atlantic, 1964)

With David Amram

- Subway Night (RCA, 1972)

With Bob Brookmeyer

- Brookmeyer (Vik, 1956)
- Jazz Concerto Grosso (ABC-Paramount, 1957) with Gerry Mulligan and Phil Sunkel
- Portrait of the Artist (Atlantic, 1960)

With Kenny Burrell

- Blues - The Common Ground (Verve, 1968)
- Night Song (Verve, 1969)

With Donald Byrd

- Jazz Lab (Columbia, 1957) - with Gigi Gryce
- I'm Tryin' to Get Home (Blue Note, 1965)

With Teddy Charles

- Word from Bird (Atlantic, 1957)

With Jimmy Cleveland

- Cleveland Style (EmArcy, 1958)
- A Map of Jimmy Cleveland (Mercury, 1959)

With Bill Evans

- Symbiosis (MPS, 1974)

With Art Farmer

- Brass Shout (United Artists, 1959)
- Baroque Sketches (Columbia, 1967)

With Maynard Ferguson

- The Blues Roar (Mainstream, 1965)

With Dizzy Gillespie

- Gillespiana (Verve, 1960)
- Carnegie Hall Concert (Verve, 1961)

With Urbie Green

- All About Urbie Green and His Big Band (ABC-Paramount, 1956)

With Coleman Hawkins

- The Hawk in Hi Fi (RCA Victor, 1956)

With Jimmy Heath

- Swamp Seed (Riverside, 1963)

With Roland Kirk

- The Roland Kirk Quartet Meets the Benny Golson Orchestra (Mercury, 1963)

With John Lewis

- Essence (Atlantic, 1962)

With Arif Mardin

- Journey (Atlantic, 1974)

With Gil Mellé

- 5 Impressions of Color (Blue Note, 1955)
- Gil's Guests (Prestige, 1963)

With Charles Mingus

- The Black Saint and the Sinner Lady (Impulse!, 1963)
- Mingus Mingus Mingus Mingus Mingus (Impulse!, 1963)

With the Modern Jazz Quartet

- Plastic Dreams (Atlantic, 1971)

With James Moody

- Moody with Strings (Argo, 1961)
- Moody and the Brass Figures (Milestone, 1966)

With Wes Montgomery

- Movin' Wes (Verve, 1964)

With Lee Morgan

- Delightfulee (Blue Note, 1966)

With Oliver Nelson

- Impressions of Phaedra (United Artists Jazz, 1962)
- The Kennedy Dream (Impulse!, 1967)

With Oscar Peterson

- Bursting Out with the All-Star Big Band! (Verve, 1962)

With Sonny Rollins

- Sonny Rollins and the Big Brass (Metro Jazz, 1958)

With Lalo Schifrin

- New Fantasy (Verve, 1964)
- Once a Thief and Other Themes (Verve, 1965)

With Jimmy Smith

- The Cat (Verve, 1964)
- Hoochie Coochie Man (Verve, 1966)

With Billy Taylor

- My Fair Lady Loves Jazz (Impulse!, 1957)

With Clark Terry

- Top and Bottom Brass (Riverside, 1959)

With The Thad Jones / Mel Lewis Orchestra

- New Life (A&M, 1975)

With Cal Tjader

- Several Shades of Jade (Verve, 1963)

With Stanley Turrentine

- Nightwings (Fantasy, 1977)
