= Nancy Overton =

American singer

- Born: Anne Swain; February 6, 1926; Port Washington, New York, U.S.
- Died: April 5, 2009 (aged 83) Blairstown, New Jersey, U.S.
- Occupations: Singer, songwriter
- Spouse(s): Hall Overton (m. 1949); 2 children

Nancy Swain Overton (born Anne Swain; February 6, 1926 – April 5, 2009) was an American pop singer and songwriter, known for her work with The Heathertones and as a touring member of The Chordettes.

== Biography ==
Overton began singing professionally in the 1940s. In 1946, she formed the vocal quartet The Heathertones with her sister Jean Swain, Bix Brent, and Pauli Skindlov. The group later included Ellie Decker and Marianne McCormick, performed with bandleader Ray Heatherton, and recorded or appeared with musicians including Benny Goodman and Tommy Dorsey before disbanding in 1953.

In 1957, Overton joined The Chordettes for live appearances after Janet Ertel stopped touring with the group. Overton toured with The Chordettes until the group broke up in the early 1960s, although she did not record with the group for Cadence Records.

== Personal life ==
Overton married jazz pianist, composer, and arranger Hall Overton in 1949. The family moved from New York City to Englewood, New Jersey, in 1966, reportedly at the urging of Dizzy Gillespie. After Hall Overton died in 1972, Nancy Overton retired from show business and worked for Prentice-Hall Publishers as an editorial assistant.

== Family ==
Overton had two sons, including actor and comedian Rick Overton.

== Later life and death ==
Overton moved to Blairstown, New Jersey, in 1982. She died there from esophageal cancer on April 5, 2009, at the age of 83.

== Discography ==
With Bob Brookmeyer

- The Dual Role of Bob Brookmeyer (Prestige, 1954)
