= Hall Overton =

American composer and music teacher

- Born: Hall Franklin Overton; February 23, 1920; Bangor, Michigan, U.S.
- Died: November 24, 1972 (aged 52) New York City, U.S.
- Genres: Jazz; Classical music
- Occupations: Composer; arranger; jazz pianist; music educator
- Instrument: Piano

Hall Franklin Overton (February 23, 1920 – November 24, 1972) was an American composer, arranger, jazz pianist, and music educator. His work encompassed jazz and classical music, including symphonies, chamber music, and opera.

== Life ==
He was born in Bangor, Michigan, the first of the three sons of Stanford and Ruth (Barnes) Overton. He grew up in Grand Rapids, Michigan. After taking piano lessons as a youngster, Overton realized he'd have to travel beyond his small Midwestern town to find the kind of music instruction he wanted. His high school music teacher recognized Overton's gift and recommended he attend The Chicago Musical College after graduation. Overton studied theory and composition there from 1940 to 1942.

He then entered the armed services and served in overseas combat duty with the U.S. 3rd Armored Division until 1945. It was during his time in the service that he learned to play jazz. Upon his discharge from the army, Overton continued his musical studies at The Juilliard School of Music, studying composition with Vincent Persichetti. He graduated in 1951 with an M.S. degree, then became a member of the faculty there.

In 1954 Overton moved into a New York City loft at 821 Sixth Avenue, known as the Jazz Loft, where he lived alongside photographer W. Eugene Smith, musician Dick Cary, painter David X. Young, and other established and rising musicians and artists. This provided the perfect setting for the musicians to jam and learn together. Smith recorded many of these sessions, which were released in October 2000 as part of the Jazz Loft Project, a large ongoing project involving Smith's photos and tapes from that period.

While Overton was writing classical compositions, he was also deeply immersed in jazz, and recorded with such jazz notables as Stan Getz, Duke Jordan, Jimmy Raney and Teddy Charles. Thelonious Monk selected him to score his piano works for orchestra; a performance of these compositions in New York City was recorded live on February 28, 1959 and released on the album The Thelonious Monk Orchestra at Town Hall. In 1963, Monk recorded a second live album with orchestral arrangements by Overton at the New York Philharmonic Hall, released as Big Band and Quartet in Concert.

In later years, Overton taught at the Yale School of Music and the New School of Social Research. See: List of music students by teacher: N to Q#Hall Overton. He received awards from The Koussevitzky Foundation and the John Simon Guggenheim Memorial Foundation.

== Death ==
Overton died on November 24, 1972, aged 52, from cirrhosis of the liver. A little more than a year earlier, on May 20, 1971, his opera Huckleberry Finn, commissioned by the Barney Jaffin Foundation, was presented by The Juilliard Opera Company.

== Family ==
Overton married Nancy Swain (1926–2009) in 1949, with whom he had two sons, Richard Adair (Rick) Overton and Steven Swain Overton.

== Compositions ==
Overton's compositions included operas, orchestral music, chamber works, and music for solo piano.

=== Stage works ===
- The Enchanted Pear Tree (1950)
- Pietro's Petard (1963)
- Huckleberry Finn (1971), with a libretto by Overton and Judah Stampfer

=== Orchestral works ===
- Symphony No. 1 for Strings (1955)
- Symphony No. 2 (1962)
- Interplay (1964)
- Sonorities (1964)
- Rhythms for Violin and Orchestra (1965)
- Pulsations for Chamber Orchestra (1972)

=== Chamber and piano works ===
- Three string quartets (1950, 1954, and 1967)
- String Trio (1957)
- Polarities No. 1 for piano (1959)
- Sonata for Viola and Piano (1960)
- Sonata for Cello and Piano (1960)
- Piano Sonata (1963)
- Polarities No. 2 for piano (1971)

== Discography ==
=== As leader ===
- Jazz Laboratory Series Vol. 2 (Signal, 1955)
- Second String Quartet/String Quartet with Ezra Laderman (CRI, 1959)
- Dual Piano Jazz with Dave McKenna (Bethlehem, 1960)
- Pulsations/In Praise of Diplomacy and Common Sense with Lester Trimble (CRI, 1972)

=== As sideman ===
With Teddy Charles

- New Directions (Prestige, 1954)
- The Teddy Charles Tentet (Atlantic, 1956)
- 3 for Duke (Jubilee, 1957)
- Word from Bird (Atlantic, 1957)

With Jimmy Raney

- Jimmy Raney Plays (Prestige, 1953)
- Jimmy Raney Quartet Featuring Hal Overton (New Jazz, 1954)
- Jimmy Raney Quartet Hifi Vol. 2 (New Jazz, 1954)
- Jimmy Raney 1955 (Prestige, 1955)
- Jimmy Raney in Three Attitudes (ABC-Paramount, 1957)
- The Fourmost Guitars with Chuck Wayne, Joe Puma, Dick Garcia (ABC-Paramount, 1957)
- A (Prestige, 1958)

With others

- Stan Getz, Early Stan (Prestige, 1963)
- Duke Jordan & Hall Overton, Jazz Laboratory Series (Arista, 1981)
- Aaron Sachs, Clarinet and Co. (Fresh Sound, 1957)
- Phil Woods, Bird Calls Vol. 1 (Savoy, 1987)
