= Teddy Charles =

American jazz musician and composer

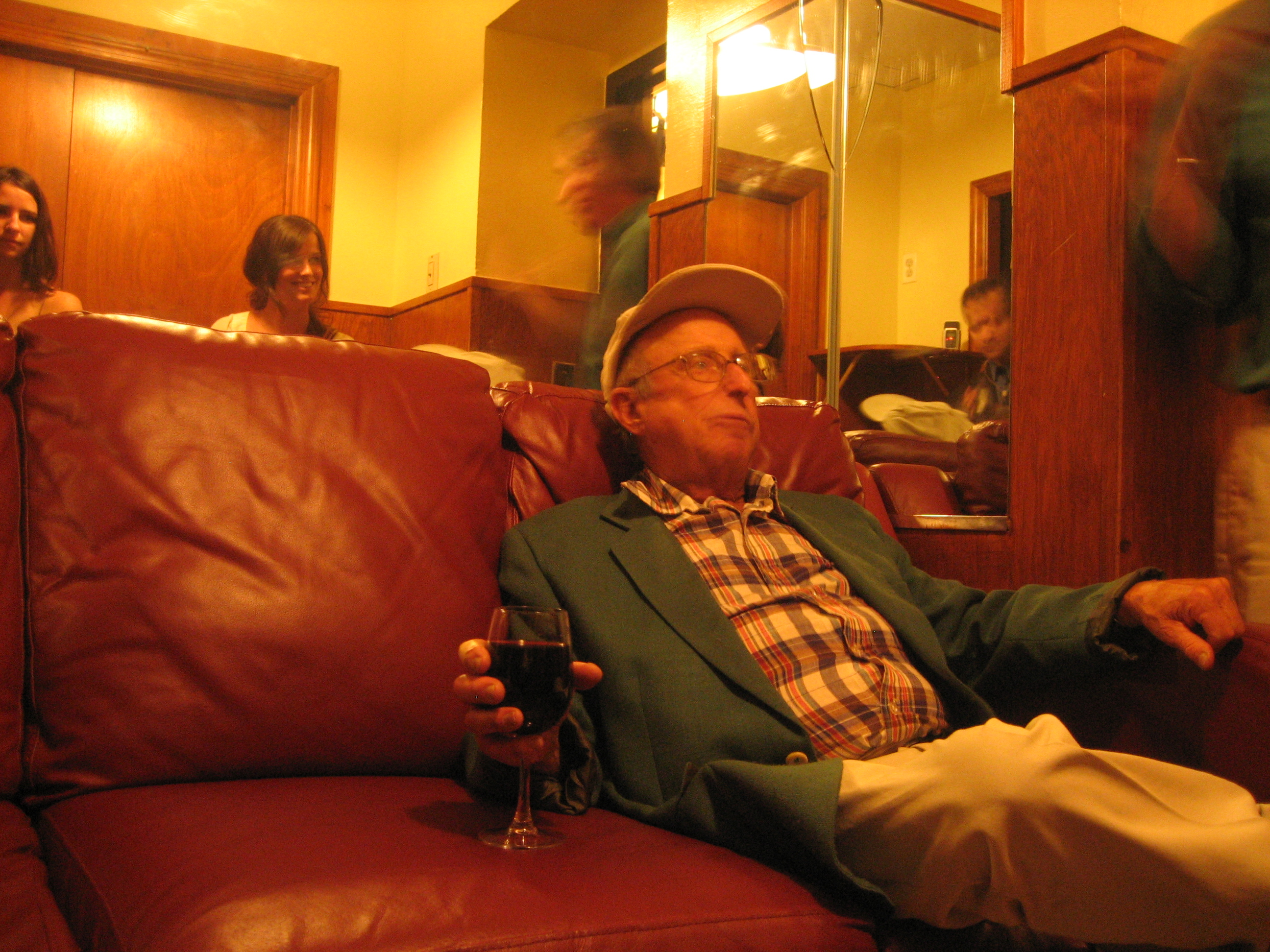

Background information
- Born: Theodore Charles Cohen; April 13, 1928; Chicopee Falls, Massachusetts, U.S.
- Died: April 16, 2012 (aged 84) Riverhead, New York
- Genre: Jazz
- Occupations: Musician, record producer, arranger
- Instruments: Vibraphone, piano, drums
- Labels: Prestige, Atlantic, Jubilee, Bethlehem, Columbia, Warwick, Soul Note, Smalls
- Formerly of: The Prestige Jazz Quartet

Teddy Charles, born Theodore Charles Cohen (April 13, 1928 – April 16, 2012) was an American jazz musician and composer, whose instruments were the vibraphone, piano, and drums.

== Career ==
Born Theodore Charles Cohen in Chicopee Falls, Massachusetts, United States, he studied at the Juilliard School of Music as a percussionist. Later he began to record and made personal appearances as Teddy Cohen with bands as a vibraphonist, writing, arranging, and producing records. In 1951, he changed his last name to Charles.

Charles was one of many jazz musicians who hung out at an apartment building at 821 Sixth Avenue, in New York City, known as the Jazz Loft rented by photographer and artist David X. Young, who in turn sublet two apartments to Hall Overton (Charles's mentor) and Dick Cary.

Known as an innovator, Charles's main work was recorded in the 1950s, with polytonal albums such as New Directions, Collaboration: West, Word from Bird, and The Teddy Charles Tentet. He was a studio musician for Miles Davis, Charles Mingus, Shelly Manne, and Dion. From the mid-1950s onwards, Charles worked primarily as a record producer. He was also a co-leader of the Prestige Jazz Quartet. He recorded an album, Live at the Verona Jazz Festival, for Soul Note in 1988.

Charles was captain of the 1906 wooden schooner Mary E he purchased in 1973 and restored, and later captained the boat Pilgrim out of Greenport, New York (on the North Fork of Long Island) and performed music locally. In his last years, he began performing again after spending some years at sea. His last recording was the 2011 collaboration with Wily Bo Walker and Danny Flam featuring the song "You Don't Know What Love Is".

He died of heart failure in 2012, aged 84.

== Discography ==
=== As leader ===
- West Coasters (Prestige, 7" EP, 1953)
- New Directions 3 (Prestige, 10" LP, 1953; rel. 1954)
- New Directions 4 (Prestige, 10" LP, 1954)
- The Teddy Charles Tentet (Atlantic 1229, 1956)
- Collaboration West (Prestige, 1956)
- 3 for Duke (Jubilee, 1957)
- The Prestige Jazz Quartet (Prestige, 1957)
- Word from Bird (Atlantic, 1957)
- Evolution (Prestige, 1957)
- Vibe-Rant (Elektra, 1957)
- Word from Bird (Atlantic Records, 1957)
- Coolin' (New Jazz, 1959)
- Salute to Hamp (Bethlehem, 1959)
- Jazz in the Garden at the Museum of Modern Art (Warwick, 1960)
- On Campus: Ivy League Jazz Concert (Bethlehem, 1960)
- Russia Goes Jazz (United Artists, 1964)
- Live at the Verona Jazz Festival 1988 (Soul Note, 1989)
- Dances with Bulls (Smalls, 2008)

==== Reissues ====
- Nontet & Tentet Complete Recordings (Jazz Collectables, 2001)
- Adventures in California (Fresh Sound Records, 2006; reissue of West Coasters and New Directions 4)

=== As sideman ===
With Bob Brookmeyer

- The Dual Role of Bob Brookmeyer (Prestige, 1956) – rec. 1954–1955
- Street Swingers (World Pacific, 1958)

With Charles Mingus

- East Coasting (Bethlehem, 1957)
- Town Hall Concert (United Artists, 1962)
- Nostalgia in Times Square/The Immortal 1959 Sessions (Columbia, 1979)
- Mingus Dynasty (Columbia, 1960)

With others

- Australian Jazz Quintet, Modern Jazz Performance of Kurt Weill's Three Penny Opera (Bethlehem, 1958)
- Donald Byrd & Pepper Adams, Out of This World (Warwick, 1961)
- Miles Davis, Blue Moods (Debut, 1955)
- Rusty Dedrick, A Jazz Journey (Monmouth, 1965)
- Aretha Franklin, Unforgettable: A Tribute to Dinah Washington (Columbia Records, 1964)
- Curtis Fuller & Hampton Hawes, Curtis Fuller and Hampton Hawes with French Horns (Status, 1965)
- Wardell Gray, Memorial Volume One (Prestige, 1955)
- Thad Jones, Olio (Prestige, 1957)
- Lee Konitz, Ezz-thetic (New Jazz, 1964)
- Eric Kloss, Grits & Gravy (Prestige, 1967)
- Alonzo Levister, Manhattan Monodrama (Debut, 1957)
- Teo Macero, Teo (Prestige, 1957)
- Mary Ann McCall, Detour to the Moon (Jubilee, 1958)
- Gil Melle, Gil's Guests (Prestige, 1956)
- Metronome All-Stars, Metronome All-Stars 1956 (Clef, 1956)
- Gunther Schuller & George Russell, Modern Jazz Concert (Columbia, 1958)
- Harold Vick, Watch What Happens (RCA Victor, 1968)
