= Wes Montgomery discography =

This is the discography for American jazz musician Wes Montgomery.

== Discography ==
=== As leader ===
Year recorded	Album	Label	Year released	Source
1949-1958	In the Beginning	Resonance	2015	
1957-1958	Echoes of Indiana Avenue	Resonance	2012	
1959	One Night in Indy	Resonance	2016	
1959	The Wes Montgomery Trio	Riverside	1959	
1960	The Incredible Jazz Guitar of Wes Montgomery	Riverside	1960	
1960	Movin' Along	Riverside	1960	
1961	So Much Guitar	Riverside	1961	
1962	Full House	Riverside	1962	
1959-1963	Guitar on the Go	Riverside	1966	
1960-1963	The Alternative Wes Montgomery	Milestone	1982	
1963	Fusion! Wes Montgomery with Strings	Riverside	1963	
1963	Boss Guitar	Riverside	1963	
1963	Portrait of Wes	Riverside	1966	
1964	Movin' Wes	Verve	1964	
1965	Straight No Chaser	Bandstand	1995	In Paris
1965	Bumpin'	Verve	1965	
1965	Solitude	BYG	1973	
1965	Goin' Out of My Head	Verve	1966	
1965	Willow Weep for Me	Verve	1969	
1966	Smokin' in Seattle	Resonance	2017	
1966	Tequila	Verve	1966	
1966	California Dreaming	Verve	1966	
1967	A Day in the Life	A&M	1967	
1967-1968	Down Here on the Ground	A&M	1968	
1968	Road Song	A&M	1968	

=== With The Montgomery Brothers ===
Year recorded	Album	Label	Year released	Notes
1957	The Montgomery Brothers and 5 Others	World Pacific	1958	Features Freddie Hubbard. Reissued as Fingerpickin' (Pacific Jazz, 1996)
1957-1958	Wes, Buddy and Monk Montgomery	Pacific Jazz	1961	
1958	Montgomeryland	Pacific Jazz	1960	Reissued as Far Wes (Pacific Jazz, 1990)
1961	Groove Yard	Riverside	1961	
1961	George Shearing and the Montgomery Brothers	Jazzland	1961	Co-leader with George Shearing. Reissued as Love Walked In (Jazzland, 1962)
1961	The Montgomery Brothers	Fantasy	1962	
1961	The Montgomery Brothers in Canada	Fantasy	1961	

=== Compilations ===
- The Best of Wes Montgomery (Verve, 1967, No. 56 US, No. 98 CB)
- The Best of Wes Montgomery Vol. 2 (Verve, 1968, No. 187 US)
- Greatest Hits (A&M, 1970, No. 175 US)
- Beginnings (Blue Note, 1975) [2 LP] – BN LA 531
- Yesterdays (Milestone/Fantasy, 1980) [2 LP]
- Far Wes (Pacific Jazz, 1990)
- Fingerpickin' (Pacific Jazz, 1996)
- The Montgomeryland Sessions (Phoenix Records, 2013) 32 track Montgomery Brothers compilation

=== Collaborations ===
- Bags Meets Wes! with Milt Jackson (Riverside, 1962)
- Smokin' at the Half Note with the Wynton Kelly Trio (Verve, 1965)
- Maximum Swing: The Unissued 1965 Half Note Recordings with the Wynton Kelly Trio (Resonance, 2023)
- Jimmy & Wes: The Dynamic Duo with Jimmy Smith (Verve, 1966)
- Further Adventures of Jimmy and Wes with Jimmy Smith (Verve, 1969)
- Live at the Turf Club 1956 with the Montgomery–Johnson Quintet (Resonance, 2014) [RSD 10" LP, Limited Edition]

=== As sideman ===
- Cannonball Adderley, Cannonball Adderley and the Poll Winners (Riverside, 1961)
- Nat Adderley, Work Song (Riverside, 1960)
- Jon Hendricks, A Good Git-Together (World Pacific, 1959)
- Harold Land, West Coast Blues! (Jazzland, 1960)
- The Mastersounds, Kismet (World Pacific, 1958)
- Wes Montgomery With Lionel Hampton, Complete Recordings (Definitive, 2001) (2CD) – compilation
