= Fusion! Wes Montgomery with Strings =

Studio album by Wes Montgomery
- Released: 1963
- Recorded: April 18–19, 1963
- Studio: Plaza Sound Studios, New York City
- Genre: Jazz
- Length: 42:39 (reissue)
- Label: Riverside
- Producer: Orrin Keepnews

Wes Montgomery chronology
| Full House (1962) | Fusion! Wes Montgomery with Strings (1963) | Boss Guitar (1963) |

Fusion!: Wes Montgomery with Strings is an album by the American jazz guitarist Wes Montgomery, released in 1963.

== History ==
Fusion was the first album Montgomery recorded with a string section. This would become more commonplace on his later releases on the Verve and A&M labels.

It has been reissued in the Original Jazz Classics series with additional alternate takes and all the tracks are also available on the Wes Montgomery compilation CD-set The Complete Riverside Recordings.

== Reception ==
Professional ratings
Review scores
| Source | Rating |
|---|---|
| AllMusic | 4/5 stars |
| The Penguin Guide to Jazz Recordings | 3/4 stars |
| The Rolling Stone Jazz Record Guide | 3/5 stars |

In his AllMusic review, music critic Scott Yanow praised the album: "As with his later albums, Montgomery's guitar solos here are brief and melodic but the jazz content is fairly high even if the emphasis is (with the exception of 'Tune Up') on ballads... worth picking up; the music is quite pretty and pleasing."

== Track listing ==
1. "All the Way" (Jimmy Van Heusen, Sammy Cahn) – 2:39
2. "Pretty Blue" (Wes Montgomery) – 3:40
3. "Pretty Blue" [Alternate take] (Montgomery) – 2:58
4. "In the Wee Small Hours of the Morning" (Mann, Hilliard) – 2:51
5. "Prelude to a Kiss" (Duke Ellington, Irving Mills, Irving Gordon) – 3:08
6. "The Girl Next Door" (Ralph Blane, Hugh Martin) – 3:08
7. "My Romance" (Richard Rodgers, Lorenz Hart) – 2:31
8. "God Bless the Child" (Billie Holiday, Arthur Herzog Jr.) – 3:19
9. "Tune Up" (Miles Davis) – 3:14
10. "Tune Up" [Alternate take] (Davis) – 5:09
11. "Tune Up" [Alternate take] (Davis) – 4:44
12. "Somewhere" (Leonard Bernstein, Stephen Sondheim) – 3:30
13. "Baubles, Bangles & Beads" (George Forrest, Robert Wright, Alexander Borodin) – 2:19

== Personnel ==
- Wes Montgomery – guitar
- Milt Hinton – bass
- Kenny Burrell – guitar
- Dick Hyman – piano, celesta
- Hank Jones – piano, celesta
- Osie Johnson – drums
- Phil Bodner – woodwinds
- Burt Fisch – viola
- Ralph Hersh – viola
- Alfred Brown – viola
- Leo Kruczek – violin
- Harry Lookofsky – violin
- Mac Ceppos – violin
- Winston Collymore – violin
- Arnold Eidus – violin
- David Nadien – violin
- Gene Orloff – violin, concert master
- Raoul Poliakin – violin
- Samuel Rand – violin
- Sylvan Shulman – violin
- Paul Winter – violin
- Isadore Zir – violin
- George Ricci – cello
- Lucien Schmit – cello
- Charles McCracken – cello
- Kermit Moore – cello
- Margaret Ross – harp
- Gloria Agostini – harp

Production notes:

- Orrin Keepnews – producer
- Ray Fowler – engineer
- Jimmy Jones – conductor, arranger
