= The Wes Montgomery Trio =

Studio album by Wes Montgomery
- Released: March 1960
- Recorded: October 5–6, 1959
- Studio: Reeves Sound Studios, New York City
- Genre: Jazz
- Length: 48:33
- Label: Riverside
- Producer: Orrin Keepnews

Wes Montgomery chronology
Far Wes (1959)	The Wes Montgomery Trio (1960)	The Incredible Jazz Guitar of Wes Montgomery (1960)

The Wes Montgomery Trio (a.k.a. A Dynamic New Sound) is an album by the American jazz guitarist Wes Montgomery, released in 1960. The track "Missile Blues" is named after the club in Indianapolis where Montgomery played before moving to New York City to record for Riverside. At this club, he met Riverside's record producer Orrin Keepnews. The album was reissued on the Original Jazz Classics label.

== Reception ==
Professional ratings
Review scores
Source	Rating
AllMusic	4/5 stars
DownBeat	4/5 stars
The Penguin Guide to Jazz Recordings	3/4 stars
The Rolling Stone Album Guide	4/5 stars

In his AllMusic review, music critic Ronnie D. Lankford, Jr. wrote: "The only drawback is that the accompaniment, which though solid, doesn't seem to perfectly match his guitar style... Montgomery's performance... was a revolution in technique and execution. Suddenly, out of nowhere, a 36-year-old guitarist re-imagines the jazz guitar solo."

== Track listing ==
1. "'Round Midnight" (Thelonious Monk, Cootie Williams) – 4:58
2. "Yesterdays" (Otto Harbach, Jerome Kern) – 3:20
3. "The End of a Love Affair" (Edward Redding) – 3:18
4. "Whisper Not" (Benny Golson) – 4:40
5. "Ecaroh" (Horace Silver) – 3:00
6. "Satin Doll" [Alternate take] (Duke Ellington, Johnny Mercer, Billy Strayhorn) – 4:08
7. "Satin Doll" (Ellington, Mercer, Strayhorn) – 3:58
8. "Missile Blues" [Alternate take] (Wes Montgomery) – 4:37
9. "Missile Blues" (Montgomery) – 6:04
10. "Too Late Now" (Burton Lane, Alan Jay Lerner) – 4:55
11. "Jingles" (Montgomery) – 5:31

Tracks 6 & 8 do not appear on the original album.

== Personnel ==
- Wes Montgomery – guitar
- Melvin Rhyne – organ
- Paul Parker – drums

Production notes:

- Orrin Keepnews – producer
- Jack Higgins – engineer

== Session information ==
Cuts 1, 5, 6, 7, 8 recorded at Reeves Sound Studios, NYC, October 5, 1959
Cuts 2, 3, 4, 9, 10, 11 recorded at Reeves Sound Studios, NYC, October 6, 1959

== Releases ==
Riverside CRLP 1156 (original album), Riverside RLP 12-310, Riverside OJCCD-034-2
