= Tune Up =

Eddie Vinson composition popularized by Miles Davis

"Tune Up" or "Tune-Up" is a composition by Eddie Vinson, but is traditionally credited to Miles Davis, who first recorded and popularized it. It has become a jazz standard.

== Background and history ==
"Tune Up" was first recorded on May 19, 1953, with John Lewis on piano, and first appeared on the Miles Davis album Blue Haze, released in 1956, for the Prestige label. John Coltrane was a member of both Vinson's band in the late 1940s and the Miles Davis Quintet and performed the tune on numerous occasions while with Davis.

According to Jack Chamber in his book Milestones: The Music in Times of Miles Davis, both "Four" and "Tune Up" were always credited to Davis for decades, and nobody objected to the false crediting until decades later. Vinson was a blues singer at the time and had no use for the tune. Davis is documented to have also recorded the tune on November 12, 1956, and November 30, 1957, both while in Paris. Wes Montgomery recorded it in October 1960 for his album Movin' Along, and three takes of the tune appeared on his 1963 album Fusion! Wes Montgomery with Strings.

== Composition ==
The tune is typically played in the key of D major, though also modulates through the tonal centres of C major and Bb major. It has been cited as a good example of a standard with ii-V-I progressions in three different keys, making it valuable to musicians learning to play jazz. There are four ii-V-I cadences: Em7-A7-D major 7, D minor 7-G7-C major 7, C minor 7-F7-Bb major 7, and back to Em7-A7-Dmajor 7. Mark Levine in The Jazz Piano Book describes "Tune Up" as a "popular jam session tune".

== Other versions ==
- Lou Levy Quartet - Jazz in Four Colors (1956)
- Stan Levey (1956) - This Time the Drum's on Me (1956)
- The Miles Davis Quintet - When the Lights Are Low (1957)
- The J.J. Johnson Quintet - J. J. in Person! (1958)
- Max Roach - Max Roach + 4 at Newport (1958)
- Sonny Rollins - Newk's Time (March 1959)
- The Sonny Stitt Quartet - The Hard Swing (1959)
- Jackie McLean Sextet - Fat Jazz (1959)
- Georges Arvanitas Trio - Cocktail for Three (1959)
- Wes Montgomery - Movin' Along (1960)
- Michel Hausser Octet - Up in Hamburg (1960)
- George Russell Sextet - George Russell Sextet in K.C. (1961)
- Wes Montgomery - Fusion! Wes Montgomery with Strings (1964)
- Don Patterson - Tune Up! (1971)
- Sonny Stitt - Tune-Up! (1972)
- The George Shearing Trio - Windows (1978)
- Monty Alexander with Ray Brown and Jeff Hamilton - Facets (1980)
- Grant Green - Oleo (1980)
- Hank Mobley - Poppin' (1980)
- Stéphane Grappelli (1983)
- The Wolverines Big Band (1984)
- Stan Getz & Albert Dailey (1984)
- Bo Lindenstrand Quartet (January 1985)
- Doug Raney Trio - Doug Raney Trio (1985)
- Doug Sertl's Uptown Express (1985)
- Jackie McLean Quartet (1987)
- Ronnie Cuber with Randy Brecker, Lonnie Smith, Ronnie Burrage (1987)
- Stéphane Grappelli and Vassar Clements (1987)
- Tete Montoliu Trio - Catalonian Nights Vol. 2 (1988)
- The Andy Simpkins Quintet (1990)
- Ben Besiakov Trio (1990)
- Larry Bunker Quartet featuring Gary Burton (1990) (live)
- Miles Davis/Stan Getz (1993) - Tune Up
- Cindy Blackman (March 1994)
- Sergio Salvatore (April 1994)
- Tom Harrell, Jacky Terrasson (1995)
- The Don Bennett Trio (1995)
- Steve Greene Trio (1995)
- Rodney Jones (1996)
- George Coleman Quintet (June 1997)
- Orrin Evans Ortet (1997)
- Jan Verwey (1997)
- Cubismo (1997)
- Louis Smith Quartet (1999)
- Patrick Saussois - Alma Sinti (1999)
- Conte Candoli, featuring Jan Lundgren, Chuck Berghofer, Joe LaBarbera (2000)
- Rick Germanson Quintet (2003)
- Frank Morgan (June 28, 2005)
- Michel Sardaby Trio (2005)
- Wayne Wallace (2006)
- Stephen Riley, John Brown (2007)
- Claudio Roditi featuring Hélio Alves, Leonardo Cioglia, Duduka Da Fonseca (February 10, 2009)
- Wagner Tiso (April 10, 2009)
- Steve Howe Trio (March 2010)
- Pearl Django (2010)
- Masayasu Tzboguchi (2011)
- Noël Akchoté (July 22, 2014)
- Paul Williamson Quartet - live (2014)
- Sandro Roy (2014)
- Gregory Tardy (September 2016)
- Simone Daclon Trio (October 14, 2016)
- Bob Fanelli (2016 )
