= SO Much Guitar! =

Studio album by Wes Montgomery
- Released: October 1961
- Recorded: August 4, 1961
- Studio: Plaza Sound Studios, New York City
- Genre: Jazz
- Length: 38:54
- Label: Riverside
- Producer: Orrin Keepnews

Wes Montgomery chronology
Movin' Along (1960)	SO Much Guitar! (1961)	Bags Meets Wes! (1962)

So Much Guitar! (stylized on the original album cover as SO Much Guitar!) is an album by American jazz guitarist Wes Montgomery, released by Riverside Records in 1961. It was reissued by Fantasy Records as a part of the Original Jazz Classics series.

All the tracks are available on the Wes Montgomery compilation CD The Complete Riverside Recordings.

== Reception ==
Professional ratings
Review scores
Source	Rating
AllMusic	4.5/5 stars
DownBeat	3/5 stars
Tom Hull	B+
The Penguin Guide to Jazz Recordings	3.5/4 stars
PopMatters	8/10 stars
The Rolling Stone Album Guide	4/5 stars

AllMusic critic Scott Yanow called the album "one of Wes Montgomery's finest recordings... All eight performances are memorable in their own way." PopMatters journalist Neil Kelly wrote: "So Much Guitar! is Montgomery at his most comfortably virile ... one of the finest recordings you’ll ever put in your player."

== Track listing ==
1. "Twisted Blues" (Wes Montgomery) – 5:31
2. "Cotton Tail" (Duke Ellington) – 3:38
3. "I Wish I Knew" (Mack Gordon, Harry Warren) – 5:26
4. "I'm Just a Lucky So-and-So" (Ellington, Mack David) – 5:57
5. "Repetition" (Neal Hefti) – 3:48
6. "Somethin' Like Bags" (Montgomery) – 4:44
7. "While We're Young" (Morty Palitz, Alec Wilder) – 2:12
8. "One for My Baby (and One More for the Road)" (Harold Arlen, Johnny Mercer) – 7:38

== Personnel ==
- Wes Montgomery – guitar
- Hank Jones – piano
- Ron Carter – bass
- Ray Barretto – conga
- Lex Humphries – drums

Production

- Orrin Keepnews – producer
- Ray Fowler – engineer
