= The Incredible Jazz Guitar of Wes Montgomery =

Studio album by Wes Montgomery
- Released: April 1960
- Recorded: January 26 & 28, 1960
- Studio: Reeves Sound Studios (New York City)
- Genre: Jazz
- Length: 44:04
- Label: Riverside/OJC
- Producer: Orrin Keepnews

Wes Montgomery chronology
The Wes Montgomery Trio (1959)	The Incredible Jazz Guitar of Wes Montgomery (1960)	Movin' Along (1960)

The Incredible Jazz Guitar of Wes Montgomery is an album by the American jazz guitarist Wes Montgomery. Most of its tracks exemplify two of Montgomery's distinguishing techniques: "thumb picking" and the use of octaves.

In 2017, the album was selected for the National Recording Registry by the Library of Congress as "culturally, historically, or aesthetically significant".

== Reception ==
Professional ratings
Review scores
Source	Rating
All About Jazz	5/5 stars
AllMusic	5/5 stars
The Penguin Guide to Jazz	4/4 stars

The album is considered by many fans and critics to be the pinnacle of Montgomery's recorded studio work. The Penguin Guide to Jazz selected it as part of its suggested "Core Collection".

AllMusic critic Michael G. Nastos praised the album, writing: "Setting him apart from the rest, this recording established Montgomery as the most formidable modern guitarist of the era, and eventually its most influential...Montgomery is clearly talented beyond convention, consistently brilliant, and indeed incredible in the company of his sidemen, and this recording—an essential addition to every jazz guitarist fan's collection—put him on the map."

Of the CD reissue, critic Chris May of All About Jazz wrote: "The Incredible Jazz Guitar burst onto the US scene in 1960 like a benign hurricane, and it still sounds like a gale almost 50 years later... Montgomery—empathetically accompanied by pianist Tommy Flanagan, bassist Percy Heath (then riding high with the Modern Jazz Quartet), and drummer Albert Heath—makes the guitar sound like it never had before. It has sounded similar since, of course, thanks to the legion of Montgomery-influenced players, but rarely so close to perfection.... The Incredible Jazz Guitar endures, and will continue to do so."

== LP Track listing ==
1. "Airegin" (Sonny Rollins) – 4:26
2. "D-Natural Blues" (Wes Montgomery) – 5:23
3. "Polka Dots and Moonbeams" (Jimmy Van Heusen, Johnny Burke) – 4:44
4. "Four on Six" (Montgomery) – 6:15
5. "West Coast Blues" (Montgomery) – 7:26
6. "In Your Own Sweet Way" (Dave Brubeck) – 4:53
7. "Mister Walker" (Montgomery) – 4:33
8. "Gone With the Wind" (Allie Wrubel, Herb Magidson) – 6:24
- Tracks 1, 2, 4, 5, and 6 recorded at Reeves Sound Studios, NYC, January 26, 1960
- Tracks 3, 7, and 8 recorded at Reeves Sound Studios, NYC, January 28, 1960
- For CD reissues, track 7 is often listed as ""Mr. Walker (Renie)". "Renie" is an unrelated 12-bar blues composition by Wes Montgomery that was originally released on the 1960 Montgomeryland LP by the Montgomery Brothers.

Riverside RLP 12-320, RLP 1169; Fantasy OJC 036, OJCCD 036-2

== Personnel ==
Musicians

- Wes Montgomery – electric guitar
- Tommy Flanagan – piano
- Percy Heath – bass
- Albert Heath – drums

Production

- Orrin Keepnews – producer, liner notes
- Jack Higgins – engineer (recording)
- Paul Bacon-Ken Braren-Harris Lewine – design
- Lawrence N. Shustak – photography
