= Oh, You Crazy Moon =

1939 traditional pop song by Jimmy Van Heusen

Single by Tommy Dorsey and His Orchestra
- A-side: "You Don't Know How Much You Can Suffer (Until You Fall in Love)"
- Published: 1939
- Released: June 26, 1939
- Recorded: June 15, 1939
- Genre: Traditional pop
- Length: 2:55
- Label: Victor
- Composer: Jimmy Van Heusen
- Lyricist: Johnny Burke

Oh, You Crazy Moon or Oh! You Crazy Moon is a traditional pop song by Jimmy Van Heusen, with lyrics by Johnny Burke. It was recorded by Tommy Dorsey in 1939, with at least six other recorded versions following Dorsey's in 1939. It was recorded by Mel Tormé in 1960 and Frank Sinatra in 1965.

== Recordings ==
- Mel Tormé - Swingin' on the Moon (1960)
- Stan Kenton - The Romantic Approach (1961)
- Sarah Vaughan - Snowbound (1963)
- Tony Bennett - When Lights Are Low (1964)
- Wes Montgomery - California Dreaming (1966), Willow Weep for Me (1969)
- Frank Sinatra - Moonlight Sinatra (1966)
- Peggy Lee - Extra Special! (1967)
- Chet Baker - Blue Room (The VARA Studio Sessions in Holland) (1979)
- Mel Tormé and George Shearing - An Elegant Evening (1985)
- Trio Désolé featuring Lorraine Caron on the album Sweet Surrender (2013)
