= The Alternative Wes Montgomery =

Compilation album by Wes Montgomery
- Released: 1982
- Recorded: October 12, 1960 – November 27, 1963
- Genre: Jazz
- Label: Riverside
- Producer: Orrin Keepnews

Wes Montgomery chronology
Guitar on the Go (1963)	The Alternative Wes Montgomery (1982)	Movin' Wes (1964)

The Alternative Wes Montgomery is a compilation album by the American jazz guitarist Wes Montgomery, released in 1982. It contains alternate takes from previous albums for Riverside. All the tracks are available on Wes Montgomery: The Complete Riverside Recordings.

== Reception ==
Professional ratings
Review scores
Source	Rating
AllMusic	4/5 stars
The Penguin Guide to Jazz Recordings	3/4 stars
The Rolling Stone Jazz Record Guide	4/5 stars

In his AllMusic review, Scott Yanow wrote that "the mistakes and flaws (such as they are) are minor on these performances and this CD gives one a good introduction into Montgomery's early recordings."

== Track list ==
1. "Born to be Blue" (Mel Tormé, Robert Wells)
2. "S.O.S." (Wes Montgomery) (Take 2)
3. "Come Rain or Come Shine" (Johnny Mercer, Harold Arlen) (Take 1)
4. "Fried Pies" (Montgomery) (Take 1)
5. "Besame Mucho" (Consuelo Velázquez, Sunny Skylar) (Take 2)
6. "The Way You Look Tonight" (Jerome Kern, Dorothy Fields) (Take 2)
7. "Stairway to the Stars" (Malneck, Parish, Signorelli) (Take 2)
8. "Jingles" (Montgomery) (Take 8)
9. "Bock to Bock" (Montgomery) (Take 1)
10. "Doujie" (Take 7)
11. "Movin’ Along" (Montgomery) (Take 1)
12. "Body and Soul" (Edward Heyman, Robert Sour, Frank Eyton, Johnny Green) (Take 2)
13. "Tune Up" (Miles Davis) (Take 9)
14. "Tune Up" (With Strings) (Take 2)

== Personnel ==
- Wes Montgomery – guitar
- Paul Chambers – bass (2, 3)
- Jimmy Cobb – drums (2, 3, 4, 5)
- Wynton Kelly – piano (2, 3, 7, 8)
- Johnny Griffin – saxophone (2, 3)
- Mel Rhyne – organ (4, 5, 6)
- George Brown – drums (6)
- Sam Jones – bass (7, 8, 11, 12, 13)
- Philly Joe Jones – drums (7, 8)
- Milt Jackson – vibraphone (7, 8)
- Monk Montgomery – bass (9, 10)
- Buddy Montgomery – piano (9, 10)
- Bobby Thomas – drums (9, 10)
- Louis Hayes – drums (11, 12, 13)
- James Clay – flute (11, 12, 13)
- Victor Feldman – piano (11, 12, 13)
- Milt Hinton – bass (14)
- Osie Johnson – drums (14)
- Kenny Burrell – guitar (14)
- Margaret Rose – harp (14)
- Dick Hyman – piano (14)
- Jimmy Jones – string arrangement (14)
- Gene Orloff – concertmaster (14)
- Phil Bodner – woodwinds (14)
