= Jim Ferguson =

American guitarist, composer, journalist, and educator (born 1948)

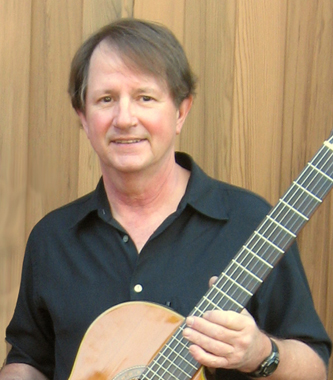
- Jim Ferguson in 2011

Background information
- Birth name: James Edwin Ferguson
- Born: December 23, 1948 (age 76); Dayton, Ohio, US
- Genres: Classical, jazz, world, acoustic
- Occupation(s): Musician, composer, educator, author, music journalist
- Instrument: Guitar
- Years active: 1970s–present
- Website: fergusonguitar.com

James Edwin Ferguson (born December 23, 1948) is an American guitarist, composer, journalist, and educator.

He has performed in the U.S. and abroad, is featured on solo guitar CDs showcasing his original compositions for classical guitar, and has had numerous compositions published in both anthologies alongside the works of other notable contemporary composers and in publications dedicated solely to his works.

He has written several jazz guitar instructional books, including All Blues for Jazz Guitar. He is a Grammy-nominated music journalist and editor.

Holding B.S. and M.F.A. degrees, he has taught guitar and music courses at universities in California for over 25 years, has conducted guitar and music workshops in the U.S. and abroad, and has taught guitar privately for more than 40 years.

== Early years ==
Born in Dayton, Ohio, Ferguson began his early music education playing the trombone when he was seven years old, then after eight years of study, switched to the guitar at the age of 15. He moved to California and began his music career in the 1970s, performing, teaching, and devoting serious study to the guitar.

== Journalism ==
Ferguson has written articles for Guitar Player (1979–1992), Down Beat, JazzTimes, Fingerstyle Guitar, and Classical Guitar (1993–1998). As a student, he studied with George Barnes, Lenny Breau, David Tanenbaum, and José Rey de la Torre. He received a Master of Fine Arts degree in Performance and Literature from Mills College and wrote his thesis on Darius Milhaud. He has written for The New Grove Dictionary of Jazz, and edited several volumes for Guitar Solo Publications of San Francisco, including an instructional series on the works of Fernando Sor, Leo Brouwer, and Matteo Carcassi, and Federico Moreno Torroba's Castillos de España. He also compiled numerous collections of historic performances for Fantasy Records, Rhino Records, and Concord Records, and worked on several projects for other labels including Riverside Records.

In 1994, Ferguson and Orrin Keepnews earned a Grammy Award nomination for Best Album Notes for their liner notes to the 12-CD set Wes Montgomery—The Complete Riverside Recordings. The notes include a biography of Montgomery by Ferguson and interviews with Nat Adderley, Ron Carter, Kenny Burrell, John Scofield, and Tommy Flanagan.

== Composing ==
Ferguson writes compositions and arrangements for both solo guitar and ensemble settings, including nylon-string guitar and flute, and nylon-string guitar and contrabass. He learned composition from Joseph Blaha and Ernest "Red" Varner. In the early 1990s, he began composing. In 2004, he released his first solo album, Cedar & Silver. Tracks from Cedar & Silver such as "Aurora" and "Blanca" have been licensed by A&E, ABC, PBS, Spike TV, and MTV India. "Brothers" was licensed by The History Channel for their special "The History of Thanksgiving". The score to "Asian Pavan" was published in the October 2005 issue of Classical Guitar magazine and was included in the Contemporary Anthology of Solo Guitar Music for Five Fingers of the Right Hand.

Moonstone (2009) consists of original compositions, including six pieces from 12 Simple Jazzy Studies. Other published works by Ferguson include Film Noir—Four Scenes, "Requiem for a Fallen Artist", Four Monsters, 12 Semi-Simple Jazzy Studies, "Winedark Sea", and Jazzotica. He has performed with Paulo Bellinati, Ray Drummond, Jorge Morel, Tommy Tedesco, and Ernie Watts.

== Teaching and writing ==
Ferguson has taught jazz and classical guitar privately and at California State University Monterey Bay (1998–2008), Evergreen Valley College (1990–2018), and San Jose City College (1991–1992). He has given private lessons, conducted workshops, and has appeared on radio and television.

Ferguson's instructional books include examples written and played by him (on accompanying CDs). The first book in the series, All Blues for Jazz Guitar, was named one of "100 Great Guitar Books" by Acoustic Guitar Magazine.

== Discography ==
=== As leader ===
- Cedar & Silver (2004)
- Moonstone (2009)
- 24 Jazzy Studies (2015)

=== As guest ===
- Songs for Our Fathers (2002), Robin Anderson Big Band featuring Jim Ferguson and former members of the Count Basie and Woody Herman big bands.

=== Recordings by other artists ===
- Ferguson's "Requiem for a Fallen Artist" performed and recorded by Marlène Demers-Lemay on 25 Compositions, 2011.
- Ferguson's Four Monsters suite performed and recorded by Meredith Connie on Fairy Tales, Monsters and Wild Animals, 2017.

=== Published compositions ===
- "Asian Pavan"
- "Sumi Dance"
- "Debussiana"
- "Chuck's Waltz" Dedicated to Charles Postlewate.
- "Leo's Blues" Dedicated to Leo Brouwer.
- "Before Six"
- "Study No. 1" (from 12 Simple Jazzy Studies)
- "Study No. 2" (from 12 Simple Jazzy Studies)
- "Study No. 3" (from 12 Simple Jazzy Studies)
- "Study No. 4" (from 12 Simple Jazzy Studies)
- "Study No. 5" (from 12 Simple Jazzy Studies)
- "Study No. 6" (from 12 Simple Jazzy Studies)
- "Study No. 7" (from 12 Simple Jazzy Studies)
- "Study No. 8" (from 12 Simple Jazzy Studies)
- "Study No. 9" (from 12 Simple Jazzy Studies)
- "Study No. 10" (from 12 Simple Jazzy Studies)
- "Study No. 11" (from 12 Simple Jazzy Studies)
- "Study No. 12" (from 12 Simple Jazzy Studies)
- "Cirque du Soul"
- "Lady Di"
- "Dark Streets & Shadows" (from Film Noir—Four Scenes)
- "Wheelman" (from Film Noir—Four Scenes)
- "Femme Fatale" (from Film Noir—Four Scenes)
- "Heater" (from Film Noir—Four Scenes)
- "Requiem for a Fallen Artist"
- "Frankenstein Meets The Jazzman" (from Four Monsters)
- "The Raven Vanishes" (from Four Monsters)
- "Mad Love" (from Four Monsters)
- "The Fly" (from Four Monsters)
- "Winedark Sea" Dedicated to JoAnn Falletta.
- Jazzotica (three-movement suite)
- "Study No. 1" (from 12 Semi-Simple Jazzy Studies)
- "Study No. 2" (from 12 Semi-Simple Jazzy Studies)
- "Study No. 3" (from 12 Semi-Simple Jazzy Studies)
- "Study No. 4" (from 12 Semi-Simple Jazzy Studies)
- "Study No. 5" (from 12 Semi-Simple Jazzy Studies)
- "Study No. 6" (from 12 Semi-Simple Jazzy Studies)
- "Study No. 7" (from 12 Semi-Simple Jazzy Studies)
- "Study No. 8" (from 12 Semi-Simple Jazzy Studies)
- "Study No. 9" (from 12 Semi-Simple Jazzy Studies)
- "Study No. 10" (from 12 Semi-Simple Jazzy Studies)
- "Study No. 11" (from 12 Semi-Simple Jazzy Studies)
- "Study No. 12" (from 12 Semi-Simple Jazzy Studies)
- Night Cats (three-movement suite)

== Jazz guitar instructional books ==
- All Blues for Jazz Guitar—Comping Styles, Chords & Grooves, 1997. Book/CD set.
- All Blues Soloing for Jazz Guitar —Scales, Licks, Concepts & Choruses, 1999. Book/CD set.
- All Blues Scale for Jazz Guitar—Solos, Grooves & Patterns, 2000. Book/CD set.
- All Solos & Grooves for Jazz Guitar—Position Studies, Scales & Patterns, 2001. Book/CD set.
- All Intros & Endings for Jazz Guitar—Bebop, Swing, Latin, Ballads, 2003. Book/CD set.
- Shapes, Patterns & Lines for Jazz Guitar, 2007. Book/CD set.
- Comping Standards for Jazz Guitar, 2014. Book/CD set.

== Awards and honors ==
- Grammy Award nomination (1994), Best Album Notes
- Achievement Certificate (1994) from the San Francisco chapter of the National Academy of Recording Arts and Sciences, presented to Jim Ferguson for his achievement in the recording of The Complete Riverside Recordings
- Maggie Award for Best Instructional Column (1989) for Jim Ferguson's column Fundamentals in Guitar Player
- Maggie Award for Best Instructional Series (1988) for Jim Ferguson's Master Series in Guitar Player
- Mills College Alumnae Scholarship (1989)
- "Romantico y Allegro Ritmico" (1992) by Jorge Morel, dedicated to Jim Ferguson
- "Chinese Metronome" (2009) by Charles Postlewate, dedicated to Jim Ferguson
