= Gene Orloff =

American jazz violinist (1921–2009)

Gene Orloff (June 14, 1921 – March 23, 2009) was an American violinist, concertmaster, arranger, contractor and session musician.

== Background ==
The son of a Russian immigrant violin maker, Orloff would try and get his father's violin down from the piano and try to play it. He was only three at the time. By the time he was five, he was playing recitals in his home city of Boston. Later, he was playing concerts at venues which included performances at Carnegie Hall and with the Boston Symphony. Having won a scholarship at the Curtis Institute of Music, he left due to the schedule and found work as a commercial musician and, on occasion, was working 15 hours per day.

During his time, the artists that Orloff performed with included Meat Loaf, The Bee Gees, Aretha Franklin, Frank Sinatra and Barbra Streisand. Orloff's daughter Marcy said that one of his favorites was Van McCoy.

== Career ==
In the late 1940s, he was in Neal Hefti's orchestra, together with, among others, Curley Russell, Shelley Manne and Flip Phillips, on a recording date backing Charlie Parker, and with Nat King Cole's trio/The Muleskinners, backing Woody Herman on vocals.

=== 1970s ===
Working under Van McCoy's direction, he handled the arrangements for the horns and strings on the Faith Hope & Charity album by Faith Hope and Charity which was released in 1970. Other musicians to play on the album were Richard Tee and Leon Pendarvis on keyboards, guitarists Eric Gale and David Spinozza, bassists Gordon Edwards, percussionists Arthur Jenkins, George Devens and drummer Steve Gadd. He also played on the Disco Baby album by Van McCoy & The Soul City Symphony which was released in 1975 and featured "The Hustle".

== Discography ==
As sideman

- 1947: The Jazz Scene (Verve Records, 1949)
- 1949: "Mule Train"/"My Baby Just Cares for Me" – Woody Herman with Nat King Cole Trio/The Muleskinners (Capitol)
- 1955: Ballads – Ben Webster
- 1955: That Old Feeling - Al Cohn
- 1955: By George! (Handy, Of Course) - George Handy
- 1956: The Hawk in Hi Fi – Coleman Hawkins
- 1957: Stormy Weather – Lena Horne
- 1958: An Image: Lee Konitz with Strings - Lee Konitz
- 1958: Jump for Joy – Cannonball Adderley
- 1959: Late Date with Ruth Brown – Ruth Brown
- 1959: Jamal at the Penthouse – Ahmad Jamal
- 1959: Heavenly -Johnny Mathis
- 1963: The Body & the Soul – Freddie Hubbard
- 1963: Fusion! Wes Montgomery with Strings – Wes Montgomery
- 1963: The Alternative Wes Montgomery – Wes Montgomery
- 1964: Who Can I Turn To - Tony Bennett
- 1965: Bumpin' – Wes Montgomery
- 1965: Sarah Vaughan Sings the Mancini Songbook – Sarah Vaughan
- 1965: The In Instrumentals – Kai Winding
- 1965: ¡Viva! Vaughan – Sarah Vaughan
- 1966: Tequila – Wes Montgomery
- 1966: The Dissection and Reconstruction of Music from the Past as Performed by the Inmates of Lalo Schifrin's Demented Ensemble as a Tribute to the Memory of the Marquis De Sade – Lalo Schifrin
- 1967: The Beat Goes On – Herbie Mann
- 1967: Wave – Antônio Carlos Jobim
- 1967: A Day in the Life – Wes Montgomery
- 1967: Beach Samba - Astrud Gilberto
- 1967: Aretha Arrives – Aretha Franklin
- 1967: The World We Knew -Frank Sinatra
- 1968: Child Is Father to the Man – Blood, Sweat & Tears
- 1968: Bigger & Better - David Newman
- 1968: Down Here on the Ground – Wes Montgomery
- 1968: Left & Right – Rahsaan Roland Kirk
- 1968: Once Upon a Dream – The Rascals
- 1968: Silver Cycles – Eddie Harris
- 1968: Windmills of My Mind – Grady Tate
- 1969: I've Gotta Be Me – Tony Bennett
- 1969: The Many Facets of David Newman - David Newman
- 1969: Daddy Bug & Friends – Roy Ayers
- 1969: Mr. Blues Plays Lady Soul - Hank Crawford
- 1969: Dusty in Memphis – Dusty Springfield
- 1969: First Take – Roberta Flack
- 1969: Round Trip – Phil Woods
- 1969: Who Really Cares – Janis Ian
- 1969: After the Long Ride Home – Grady Tate
- 1970: Tony Sings the Great Hits of Today! - Tony Bennett
- 1970: Stone Flute – Herbie Mann
- 1970: MCMLXX - Ray Bryant
- 1970: What a Wonderful World – Louis Armstrong
- 1970: Tony Bennett's "Something" - Tony Bennett
- 1970: Louis Armstrong and His Friends - Louis Armstrong
- 1971: First Light – Freddie Hubbard
- 1971: Gilberto with Turrentine – Astrud Gilberto and Stanley Turrentine
- 1971: Nature's Baby – Lena Horne
- 1971: Salt Song – Stanley Turrentine
- 1971: Sing Me a Song of Songmy – Freddie Hubbard
- 1971: Wild Horses Rock Steady – Johnny "Hammond" Smith
- 1972: Prelude – Eumir Deodato
- 1972: Breeding of Mind – O'Donel Levy
- 1972: Sunflower – Milt Jackson
- 1972: Young, Gifted and Black – Aretha Franklin
- 1972: All the King's Horses – Grover Washington, Jr.
- 1973: Turtle Bay – Herbie Mann
- 1973: Bette Midler – Bette Midler
- 1974: One – Bob James
- 1974: Walking Man – James Taylor
- 1975: Taking Off – David Sanborn
- 1975: Judith – Judy Collins
- 1975: Disco Baby - Van McCoy
- 1976: Bat Out of Hell – Meat Loaf
- 1976: Surprises - Herbie Mann (Atlantic)
- 1976: Dee Dee Bridgewater - Dee Dee Bridgewater (Atlantic)
- 1976: The Man with the Sad Face - Stanley Turrentine (Fantasy)
- 1977: Concrete Jungle – David "Fathead" Newman (Prestige)
- 1977: More Stuff – Stuff
- 1977: Tailgunner - Jimmy McGriff
- 1978: C'est Chic – Chic
- 1979: Spy – Carly Simon
- 1979: I Love to Dance – Kleeer
- 1979: Thighs and Whispers – Bette Midler
- 1979: Risque - Chic
- 1981: What Cha' Gonna Do for Me – Chaka Khan
- 1981: She Shot Me Down - Frank Sinatra
- 1984: L.A. Is My Lady - Frank Sinatra
- 1987: A Sound Investment – Flip Phillips and Scott Hamilton
- 1995: Real Time – Richard Tee
- 1995: Tonin' – The Manhattan Transfer
- 2000: Oops!... I Did It Again - Britney Spears
- 2001: King of the Beat – Bernard "Pretty" Purdie
