= Boss Guitar =

Studio album by Wes Montgomery
- Released: July 1963
- Recorded: April 22, 1963
- Studio: Plaza Sound Studios, New York City
- Genre: Jazz
- Length: 52:58 (Reissue)
- Label: Riverside
- Producer: Orrin Keepnews

Wes Montgomery chronology
Fusion! Wes Montgomery with Strings (1963)	Boss Guitar (1963)	Portrait of Wes (1963)

Boss Guitar is an album by American jazz guitarist Wes Montgomery, released in 1963 by Riverside. It was reissued on the Original Jazz Classics label with alternate takes. All the tracks are available on Wes Montgomery: The Complete Riverside Recordings.

== Reception ==
Professional ratings
Review scores
Source	Rating
AllMusic	4/5 stars
DownBeat (Original Lp release)	3/5 stars
The Penguin Guide to Jazz Recordings	2.5/4 stars
The Rolling Stone Album Guide	4/5 stars

AllMusic jazz critic Scott Yanow described Boss Guitar as "enjoyable if not essential." David Rickert, for All About Jazz, stated: "Montgomery was always at his best as the sole lead instrument, as this recording will attest."

== Track listing ==
1. "Besame Mucho" (Consuelo Velázquez, Sunny Skylar) – 6:28
2. "Besame Mucho" [Take 2]* (Velazquez, Skylar) – 6:24
3. "Dearly Beloved" (Jerome Kern, Johnny Mercer) – 4:49
4. "Days of Wine and Roses" (Henry Mancini, Johnny Mercer) – 3:44
5. "The Trick Bag" (Wes Montgomery) – 4:25
6. "Canadian Sunset" (Eddie Heywood, Norman Gimbel) – 5:04
7. "Fried Pies" (Montgomery) – 6:42
8. "Fried Pies" [Take 1]* (Montgomery) – 6:35
9. "The Breeze and I" (Ernesto Lecuona, Al Stillman) – 4:08
10. "For Heaven's Sake" (Elise Bretton, Sherman Edwards, Donald Meyer) – 4:39

(*) Alternate takes not on original LP, included in CD reissue in 1989.

== Personnel ==
- Wes Montgomery – guitar
- Melvin Rhyne – organ
- Jimmy Cobb – drums

Production notes:

- Orrin Keepnews – producer
- Ray Fowler – engineer

== Charts ==
Chart (2025)	Peak position
Greek Albums (IFPI)	47
