= Royce Campbell =

American jazz guitarist

- Born: Royce Greer; June 7, 1952 (age 74); North Vernon, Indiana, U.S.
- Genres: Jazz
- Occupation: Musician
- Instrument: Guitar
- Years active: 1971–present
- Labels: Philology, Moon Cycle

Royce Campbell (born June 7, 1952) is a jazz guitarist from Indiana who was a member of the Henry Mancini orchestra for twenty years.

== Musical career ==
He was born in North Vernon, Indiana. When he was five, his mother married a career Navy man, and Campbell grew up in cities throughout the U.S. and the world. Exposure to a variety of genres contributed to his musical style. A love for rock and roll marked his first connection with the guitar, at the age of nine, when he discovered Chuck Berry. Like many guitarists of his generation, he was influenced by Jimi Hendrix and Eric Clapton.

By the time he finished high school in Spain in the early 1970s, he had decided to pursue a career in music. His uncle, pianist Carroll DeCamp, who had done arrangements for Stan Kenton and Les Elgart, invited him to Indianapolis to live and study. His uncle provided his education in music theory and composition. At 21, he toured with rhythm and blues (R&B) singer Marvin Gaye before spending twenty years as a member of the Henry Mancini orchestra. He held the job until Mancini's death in 1994.

During the 1990s, Campbell recorded more as a leader. In 1993, he produced Project G-5: A Tribute to Wes Montgomery which also featured guitarists Tal Farlow, Jimmy Raney, Herb Ellis, and fellow Hoosier Cal Collins. His 1994 album 6x6 featured guitarists Pat Martino, John Abercrombie, Larry Coryell, Dave Stryker, and Bucky Pizzarelli. On Project G-5: A Tribute to Joe Pass (1999) he combined the talents of Charlie Byrd, Gene Bertoncini, Mundell Lowe, and John Pisano.

In November 2010, Campbell was inducted into the Indianapolis Jazz Foundation Hall of Fame.

== Discography ==
Year	Title	Label
1990	Nighttime Daydreams	Timeless
1991	Gentle Breeze [rel. 1994]	Timeless
1992	Vista	Raised Eyebrow; Sin-Drome (1993)
1993	Elegy to a Friend	Raised Eyebrow; Moon Cycle (2006)
1993	A Tribute to Wes Montgomery by Project G-5	Paddlewheel/King [Japan]; Evidence (1994)
1994	6 x 6 (Six by Six: A Jazz Guitar Celebration)	Paddlewheel/King [Japan]; Moon Cycle (2004)
1995	Make Me Rainbows	Positive Music
1995	A Tribute to Henry Mancini	Episode; String Jazz (1999)
1998	Pitapat	A Records/Challenge
1998	Hands Across the Water (with Adrian Ingram)	String Jazz
1999	A Tribute to Joe Pass by Project G-5	Paddlewheel/King [Japan]
1999	Royce Campbell with Strings	Chase Music
1999	Remembering Wes (with Mel Rhyne)	Savant
2002	Trioing	Jardis
2003	A Tribute to Charlie Byrd (with Gene Bertoncini)	Jardis
2003	A Jazz Guitar Christmas	Moon Cycle
2005	Plays for Lovers (with Fred Hersch)	Moon Cycle
2006	Gypsy Soul	Moon Cycle
2007	Get Happy	Foxhaven
2007	A Solo Guitar Christmas	Moon Cycle
2008	The Art of Chord Solo Guitar	Moon Cycle
2008	A Jazz Guitar Christmas, Volume II	Moon Cycle
2008	Trio By Starlight	Philology
2008	Roses & Wine	Philology
2009	Solo Wes: A Solo Guitar Tribute to Wes Montgomery	Moon Cycle
2009	Solo Mancini: A Solo Guitar Tribute to Henry Mancini	Moon Cycle
2009	All Standards...and a Blues	Philology
2009	Movie Songs Project (with Phil Woods)	Philology
2010	Concepts	Moon Cycle
2010	What is This Thing Called	Philology
2010	Solo Trane: A Solo Guitar Tribute to John Coltrane	Moon Cycle
2011	Jazz Blues (compilation)	Moon Cycle
2012	All Ballads...and a Bossa	Moon Cycle
2012	The Beginning	Moon Cycle
2015	Romancing the Tone	Moon Cycle
2017	Tea for Three (with Hod O'Brien)	Moon Cycle
2018	Duo (with Bob Bowen)	Moon Cycle
2019	Organ Trio	Moon Cycle
2023	Originals	Moon Cycle

== Additional sources ==
- Benedetto, Robert. Making an Archtop Guitar. Anaheim Hills, CA: Centerstream Publishing, 1994. xiii.
- Boyd, Herb. "CD Reviews: A Tribute to Henry Mancini". Down Beat 63.6 (June 1996): 45.
- Cook, Richard, and Brian Morton. The Penguin Guide to Jazz. 9th ed. New York, NY: The Penguin Group, 2008. 221, 1209.
- Ellis, Andy. "A Tribute to Wes Montgomery". Guitar Player 29.2 (Feb 1995): 146.
- Ellis, Andy. "Hands Across the Water". Guitar Player 32.12 (Dec 1998): 139.
- Ephland, John. "Rudy Linka-Royce Campbell". Down Beat 74.3 (March 2007): 71.
- Ephland, John. "Traveling Guitars". Down Beat 76.2 (Feb 2009): 71.
- Erlewine, Stephen Thomas, ed. All Music Guide to Jazz: The Definitive Guide to Jazz. 4th ed. San Francisco, CA: Backstreet Publishing, 2002. 1063.
- Esposito, Russell R. The Golden Milestone. 4th ed. New York, NY: The New York Learning Library, 2007. 320.
- Ingram, Adrian. Mel Bay Concise History of the Electric Guitar. Pacific, MO: Mel Bay Publications, 2006. 106.
- Ingram, Adrian. The Gibson L5. Anaheim Hills, CA: Centerstream Publishing, 1997. 7, 68, 74.
- Koert, Hans. "The Five Guitars". IAJRC Journal 40.4 (Dec 2007): 71–72.
- Koransky, Jason. "Project Shopping". Down Beat 66.6 (June 1999): 53.
- Larkin, Colin, ed. Encyclopedia of Popular Music. 4th ed. US: Oxford University Press, 2006.
- Levy, Adam. "Royce Campbell". Guitar Player 33.12 (Dec 1999): 41.
- Resnicoff, Matt. "Project G-5: A Tribute to Wes Montgomery". Guitar Player 29.6 (June 1995): 29–30.
- Smith, Will. "Six by Six: A Jazz Guitar Celebration". Down Beat 72.7 (July 2005): 76.
