= Guitar on the Go =

Studio album by Wes Montgomery
- Released: October 1966
- Recorded: 1959–1963
- Studio: Plaza Sound Studios, New York City
- Genre: Jazz
- Length: 42:21 (Reissue)
- Label: Riverside
- Producer: Orrin Keepnews

Wes Montgomery chronology
Portrait of Wes (1963)	Guitar on the Go (1966)	The Alternative Wes Montgomery (1963)

Guitar on the Go is an album by American jazz guitarist Wes Montgomery that released in 1966. It includes tracks recorded in 1959 and October and November 1963. The album was Montgomery's last for Riverside before signing with Verve.

Guitar on the Go was reissued in the Original Jazz Classics series with an additional take of "The Way You Look Tonight" and the bonus track "Unidentified Solo Guitar".

== Reception ==
Professional ratings
Review scores
Source	Rating
Allmusic	3/5 stars
The Rolling Stone Jazz Record Guide	3/5 stars
The Penguin Guide to Jazz Recordings	3/4 stars

Jazz critic Scott Yanow called the release "a worthy if not essential addition to Wes Montgomery's discography" and, due to his later change of style to a more pop-oriented approach, "the end of an era."

== Track listing ==
1. "The Way You Look Tonight" [Alternate take] (Jerome Kern, Dorothy Fields) – 5:48
2. "The Way You Look Tonight" (Kern, Fields) – 9:08
3. "Dreamsville" (Ray Evans, Jay Livingston, Henry Mancini) – 3:48
4. "Geno" (Wes Montgomery) – 2:53
5. "Missile Blues" (Montgomery) – 5:57
6. "For All We Know" (J. Fred Coots, Sam M. Lewis) – 4:29
7. "Fried Pies" (Montgomery) – 6:41
8. "Mi Cosa (Take 1)" (Montgomery) – 3:37

== Personnel ==
- Wes Montgomery – guitar
- Melvin Rhyne – organ
- George Brown – drums (1–4, 6)
- Jimmy Cobb – drums (7)
- Paul Parker – drums (5)

Production notes:

- Orrin Keepnews – producer
