= Newk's Time =

1959 studio album by Sonny Rollins

Studio album by Sonny Rollins
- Released: March 1959
- Recorded: September 22, 1957
- Studio: Van Gelder Studio, Hackensack, New Jersey
- Genre: Bop; Hard bop
- Length: 34:14
- Label: Blue Note
- Producer: Alfred Lion

Sonny Rollins chronology
Sonny Side Up (1959)	Newk's Time (1959)	Sonny Rollins and the Contemporary Leaders (1959)

Professional ratings
Review scores
Source	Rating
AllMusic	4/5 stars
The Rolling Stone Jazz Record Guide	4/5 stars
Encyclopedia of Popular Music	5/5 stars
The Penguin Guide to Jazz Recordings	4/4 stars
DownBeat	3.5/5 stars

Newk's Time is a 1959 album by jazz saxophonist Sonny Rollins, recorded on September 22, 1957, and released on Blue Note—his third album for the label.

== Recording ==
The album was recorded at Van Gelder Studio, Hackensack, New Jersey, on September 22, 1957. Five of the six tracks are played by the quartet of Rollins, Wynton Kelly (piano), Doug Watkins (bass), and Philly Joe Jones (drums). Only Rollins and Jones play on "The Surrey with the Fringe on Top".

== Release history ==
The release marked the beginning of the Blue Note 4000 series: from this album on, releases were catalogued as "BLP 4..." (mono) and "BST 84..." (stereo).

== Title ==
The title of the album is a reference to Rollins' nickname "Newk", which is based on his resemblance to Don Newcombe, a pitcher for the Brooklyn Dodgers. "Namely You" was taken from the Broadway show Li'l Abner.

== Track listing ==
=== Side one ===
1. "Tune Up" (Miles Davis) – 5:44
2. "Asiatic Raes" [also known as " Lotus Blossom"] (Kenny Dorham) – 5:57
3. "Wonderful! Wonderful!" (Sherman Edwards, Ben Raleigh) – 5:59

=== Side two ===
1. "The Surrey with the Fringe on Top" (Richard Rodgers, Oscar Hammerstein II) – 6:32
2. "Blues for Philly Joe" (Sonny Rollins) – 6:44
3. "Namely You" (Gene de Paul, Johnny Mercer) – 3:18

== Personnel ==
Musicians

- Sonny Rollins – tenor saxophone
- Wynton Kelly – piano (except "The Surrey with the Fringe on Top")
- Doug Watkins – bass (except "The Surrey with the Fringe on Top")
- Philly Joe Jones – drums

Technical

- Alfred Lion – producer
- Rudy Van Gelder – recording engineer, mastering
- Francis Wolff – photography
- Joe Goldberg – liner notes
