= Movin' Along =

Studio album by Wes Montgomery
- Released: April 1961
- Recorded: October 12, 1960
- Studio: United Recording Studios, Los Angeles
- Genre: Jazz
- Length: 52:51 (Reissue)
- Label: Riverside
- Producer: Orrin Keepnews

Wes Montgomery chronology
The Incredible Jazz Guitar of Wes Montgomery (1960)	Movin' Along (1961)	SO Much Guitar! (1961)

Movin' Along is an album by American jazz guitarist Wes Montgomery, released in April 1961. It was reissued in the Original Jazz Classics series with two alternate takes. All the tracks are available in the Wes Montgomery compilation CD-set The Complete Riverside Recordings.

== Reception ==
Professional ratings
Review scores
Source	Rating
AllMusic	4.5/5 stars
The Penguin Guide to Jazz Recordings	3.5/4 stars
The Rolling Stone Jazz Record Guide	3/5 stars

In his AllMusic review, Scott Yanow stated: "Wes Montgomery made many of his finest jazz recordings originally for Riverside, and this is an often overlooked gem."

== Track listing ==
1. "Movin' Along" (Wes Montgomery) – 5:40
2. "Tune-Up" (Miles Davis) – 4:27
3. "Tune-Up [Alternate take]" (Davis) (*) – 4:39
4. "I Don't Stand a Ghost of a Chance with You" (Victor Young, Ned Washington, Bing Crosby) – 5:02
5. "Sandu" (Clifford Brown) – 3:23
6. "Body and Soul" (Edward Heyman, Robert Sour, Frank Eyton, Johnny Green) – 7:19
7. "Body and Soul [Alternate take]" (Heyman, Sour, Eyton, Green) (*) – 11:17
8. "So Do It!" (Montgomery) – 6:05
9. "Says You" (Sam Jones) – 4:59

(*) Bonus tracks on CD reissue in 1988

== Personnel ==
- Wes Montgomery – guitar, tenor guitar (on tracks 2, 5 & 6)
- James Clay – flute, tenor sax
- Victor Feldman – piano
- Sam Jones – bass
- Louis Hayes – drums

Production

- Orrin Keepnews – producer
