= Prelude to a Kiss (song) =

1938 single by Duke Ellington

"Prelude to a Kiss" is a 1938 ballad composed by Duke Ellington, with lyrics by Irving Gordon and Irving Mills.

== Background and composition ==
This composition is in Duke Ellington's record of 1938 in the key of A-flat major but makes extensive use of the secondary dominant chords, secondary ii–V–I progressions, diatonic circle of fifths, and evaded cadences. The song is extremely chromatic and complex, employing sophisticated mathematics that were rare at this time in jazz: Ellington's rising semitones (G-G#-A-A#-B) at the end of the bridge mirror the opening of both A sections (B-A#-A-G#-G).

By the late 1930s, swing was at the height of its popularity. Using his fame and artistic freedom, Ellington became more ambitious and experimental, writing "Prelude to a Kiss", which abandoned the Tin Pan Alley style hooks and dance tempo for melodic lines and harmonies found more often in classical music. He recorded this piece as an instrumental in August 1938 before returning to the studio a few weeks later to record it as a vocal number with lyrics by Irving Gordon and Irving Mills that were sung by a young and relatively unknown Mary McHugh. Popular records in 1938 were by Ellington and by Johnny Hodges and His Orchestra.

== Reception ==
Gunther Schuller described "Prelude to a Kiss" as "One of Ellington's finest ballads, although too sophisticated in its weaving melody and chromatic harmonies to gain wide public acceptance."

== Notable recordings ==
- Duke Ellington – Piano Reflections (1953)
- June Christy and Stan Kenton – Duet (1955)
- Billie Holiday with Benny Carter – Velvet Mood (1956)
- Sarah Vaughan - Swingin' Easy (1957)
- Mel Torme - Prelude to a Kiss 1958
- Vic Damone – Closer Than a Kiss (1958)
- Oscar Peterson - Oscar Peterson for Lovers (1959)
- Wes Montgomery – One Night in Indy -Resonance- Recorded live in 1959 (released 2016)
- Phil Woods – Live from New York (1982)
- Debbie Harry – Prelude to a Kiss soundtrack (1992)
- Dee Dee Bridgewater – Prelude to a Kiss: The Duke Ellington Album (1996)
- Claudia Acuña – Wind from the South (1999)
- Tony Bennett – Bennett Sings Ellington: Hot & Cool (1999)

== See also ==
- List of 1930s jazz standards
