= Portrait of Wes =

Studio album by Wes Montgomery
- Released: March 1966
- Recorded: October 10, 1963
- Studio: Plaza Sound Studios, New York City
- Genre: Jazz
- Length: 41:31 (Reissue)
- Label: Riverside
- Producer: Orrin Keepnews

Wes Montgomery chronology
Boss Guitar (1963)	Portrait of Wes (1966)	Guitar on the Go (1963)

Portrait of Wes is an album by the American jazz guitarist Wes Montgomery, released in 1966.

== History ==
Portrait of Wes was Montgomery's second to last recording for Riverside Records; his performances in October and November 1963 were issued as two albums, Portrait of Wes and Guitar on the Go. Montgomery, who had worked with Melvin Rhyne for his first recordings for Riverside, worked with him again for his last Riverside performance. Portrait of Wes was reissued in the Original Jazz Classics series, with additional alternate takes.

== Reception ==
Professional ratings
Review scores
Source	Rating
AllMusic	4/5 stars
The Penguin Guide to Jazz Recordings	3/4 stars
The Rolling Stone Jazz Record Guide	3/5 stars

AllMusic jazz critic Scott Yanow wrote: "The brilliant guitarist is in fine form on these appealing tunes with the highlights including 'Freddie the Freeloader,' 'Blues Riff' and 'Moanin'.'"

== Track listing ==
=== Original issue by Riverside ===
Side 1:

1. "Freddie the Freeloader" (Miles Davis) – 5:14
2. "Lolita" (Barry Harris) – 6:32
3. "Movin' Along" [AKA "Blues Riff"] (Wes Montgomery) – 6:16

Side 2:

1. "Dangerous" (Montgomery) – 7:03
2. "Yesterday's Child" (Charles DeForest) – 4:14
3. "Moanin'" (Bobby Timmons) – 5:48

=== Original Jazz Classics reissue ===
1. "Freddie Freeloader" (Miles Davis) – 5:16
2. "Lolita" (Barry Harris) – 6:36
3. "Blues Riff" (Wes Montgomery) – 6:18
4. "Blues Riff" [Alternate take] (Wes Montgomery) – 8:14
5. "Dangerous" (Wes Montgomery) – 7:03
6. "Yesterday's Child" (Charles DeForest) – 4:14
7. "Moanin'" (Bobby Timmons) – 5:48
8. "Moanin'" [Alternate take] (Timmons) – 4:35

== Personnel ==
- Wes Montgomery – guitar
- Melvin Rhyne – organ
- George Brown – drums

Production

- Orrin Keepnews – producer
- Ray Fowler – engineer
- Sam Alexander – album design
- Carl Grassini – cover painting
