= Bags Meets Wes! =

Studio album by Milt Jackson and Wes Montgomery
- Released: 1962
- Recorded: December 18–19, 1961
- Studio: Plaza Sound Studios - New York City
- Genre: Jazz
- Length: 55:07 (Reissue)
- Label: Riverside
- Producer: Orrin Keepnews

Milt Jackson chronology
Statements (1962)	Bags Meets Wes! (1962)	The Comedy (1962)

Wes Montgomery chronology
SO Much Guitar! (1961)	Bags Meets Wes! (1962)	Full House (1962)

Bags Meets Wes! is an album by Milt Jackson and Wes Montgomery, released in 1962 by Riverside. It was reissued in 1999 by the Original Jazz Classics label, with additional takes, and again in 2006.

== Reception ==
Professional ratings
Review scores
Source	Rating
AllMusic	4.5/5 stars
DownBeat	3/5 stars
The Penguin Guide to Jazz Recordings	4/4 stars

In his AllMusic review, Alex Henderson wrote: "Although Jackson and Montgomery prove what lyrical ballad players they could be on the standard 'Stairway to the Stars', ballads aren't a high priority on this album. Instead, the improvisers put more of their energy into the blues..."

== Track listing ==
1962 LP album:

1. "S.K.J." (Milt Jackson) – 5:17
2. "Stablemates" (Benny Golson) – 5:45
3. "Stairway to the Stars" (Malneck, Parish, Signorelli) – 3:38
4. "Blue Roz" (Wes Montgomery) – 4:46
5. "Sam Sack" (Jackson) – 6:06
6. "Jingles" (Montgomery) – 6:56
7. "Delilah" (Victor Young) – 6:07

1999 CD reissue:

1. "S.K.J." (Jackson) – 5:17
2. "Stablemates" (Golson) – 5:45
3. "Stairway to the Stars [Take 3]" (Malneck, Parish, Signorelli) – 3:38
4. "Blue Roz" (Montgomery) – 4:46
5. "Sam Sack" (Jackson) – 6:06
6. "Jingles [Take 9]" (Montgomery) – 6:55
7. "Delilah [Take 4]" (Victor Young) – 6:12
8. "Stairway to the Stars [Take 2]" (Malneck, Parish, Signorelli) – 3:47
9. "Jingles [Take 8]" (Montgomery) – 6:54
10. "Delilah" [Take 2] (Young) – 6:18

== Personnel ==
Musicians

- Milt Jackson – vibraphone
- Wes Montgomery – guitar
- Wynton Kelly – piano
- Sam Jones – double bass
- Philly Joe Jones – drums

Production

- Tamaki Beck – mastering
- Ken Deardoff – cover design
- Ray Fowler – engineer
- Joe Goldberg – liner notes
- Orrin Keepnews – producer, liner notes
