= Full House (Wes Montgomery album) =

Live album by Wes Montgomery
- Released: November 1962
- Recorded: June 25, 1962
- Venue: Tsubo, Berkeley, California
- Genre: Jazz
- Label: Riverside/Original Jazz Classics
- Producer: Orrin Keepnews

Wes Montgomery chronology
Bags Meets Wes! (1962)	Full House (1962)	Fusion! Wes Montgomery with Strings (1963)

Professional ratings
Review scores
Source	Rating
AllMusic	5/5 stars
DownBeat	4.5/5 stars
The Penguin Guide to Jazz Recordings	3.5/4 stars
The Rolling Stone Jazz Record Guide	4/5 stars

Full House is an album by the jazz guitarist Wes Montgomery, released in 1962.

== History ==
The performance was recorded live at Tsubo in Berkeley, California, on June 25, 1962. The session featured a quintet that included Wynton Kelly on piano, Johnny Griffin on tenor saxophone, Paul Chambers on bass, and Jimmy Cobb on drums.

The album was released on the Riverside Records label. A 1987 CD reissue in the Original Jazz Classics series was followed by a later reissue in 2007 featuring additional bonus tracks.

== Track listing ==
=== Original issue ===
1. "Full House" (Wes Montgomery) – 9:14
2. "I've Grown Accustomed to Her Face" (Alan Jay Lerner, Frederick Loewe) – 3:18
3. "Blue 'n' Boogie" (Dizzy Gillespie, Frank Paparelli) – 9:31
1. "Cariba" (Wes Montgomery) - 9:35
2. "Come Rain or Come Shine" (Johnny Mercer, Harold Arlen) – 6:49
3. "S.O.S." (Montgomery) – 4:57

=== 1987 CD ===
1. "Full House" (Wes Montgomery) - 9:16
2. "I've Grown Accustomed to Her Face" (Lerner, Loewe) - 3:29
3. "Blue 'N' Boogie" (Gillespie, Paparelli) - 9:38
4. "Cariba" (Wes Montgomery) - 9:41
5. "Come Rain or Come Shine [Take 2]" (Arlen, Mercer) - 6:57
6. "Come Rain or Come Shine [Take 1]" (Arlen, Mercer) - 7:18
7. "S.O.S. (Take 3)" (Wes Montgomery) - 5:03
8. "S.O.S. (Take 2)" (Wes Montgomery) - 4:49
9. "Born to Be Blue" (Tormé, Wells) - 7:27

=== 2007 reissue by Riverside ===
1. "Full House" (Wes Montgomery) - 9:16
2. "I've Grown Accustomed to Her Face" (Lerner, Loewe) - 3:29
3. "Blue 'N' Boogie" (Gillespie, Paparelli) - 9:38
4. "Cariba (Take 2)" (Wes Montgomery) - 9:41
5. "Come Rain or Come Shine [Take 2]" (Arlen, Mercer) - 6:57
6. "S.O.S. (Take 3)" (Wes Montgomery) - 5:03
7. "Cariba" (Wes Montgomery) - 8:28
8. "Come Rain or Come Shine" (Arlen, Mercer) - 7:21
9. "S.O.S." (Wes Montgomery) - 4:49
10. "Born to Be Blue" (Tormé, Wells) - 7:27
11. "Born to Be Blue (alternate take)" (Tormé, Wells) - 7:35

== Personnel ==
- Wes Montgomery – guitar
- Johnny Griffin – tenor sax
- Wynton Kelly – piano
- Paul Chambers – bass
- Jimmy Cobb – drums
