= California Dreaming (Wes Montgomery album) =

Studio album by Wes Montgomery
- Released: February 1967
- Recorded: September 14 – 16, 1966
- Studio: Van Gelder Studio, Englewood Cliffs, New Jersey
- Genre: Jazz
- Length: 38:40
- Label: Verve
- Producer: Creed Taylor

Wes Montgomery chronology
Goin' Out of My Head (1965)	California Dreaming (1967)	Jimmy & Wes: The Dynamic Duo (1966)

California Dreaming is an album by the jazz guitarist Wes Montgomery, released in 1967. It reached No. 1 on the Billboard magazine jazz album chart and No. 4 on the R&B album chart. It was reissued on CD in 2007 with an alternate take of "Sunny".

== Reception ==
Professional ratings
Review scores
Source	Rating
AllMusic	2/5 stars
The Penguin Guide to Jazz Recordings	3.5/4 stars
The Rolling Stone Jazz Record Guide	2/5 stars

In his review for AllMusic, jazz critic Scott Yanow wrote: "The material is strictly pop fluff of the era and the great guitarist has little opportunity to do much other than state the melody in his trademark octaves. This record was perfect for AM radio of the period." The Penguin Guide to Jazz Recordings wrote that, despite starting with a recent pop hit, the album allowed some glimpses of Montgomery’s jazz playing.

== Track listing ==
1. "California Dreaming" (John Phillips, Michelle Phillips) – 3:08
2. "Sun Down" (Wes Montgomery) – 6:03
3. "Oh, You Crazy Moon" (Jimmy Van Heusen, Johnny Burke) – 3:44
4. "More, More, Amor" (Sol Lake) – 2:54
5. "Without You" (Rinaldo Marino, Walter Myers) – 3:05
6. "Winds of Barcelona" (Lake) – 3:07
7. "Sunny [alternate take]" (Bobby Hebb) – 3:07
8. "Sunny" (Hebb) – 4:04
9. "Green Peppers" (Lake) – 2:56
10. "Mr. Walker" (Montgomery) – 3:39
11. "South of the Border" (Jimmy Kennedy, Michael Carr) – 3:13

== Personnel ==
- Wes Montgomery – guitar
- Mel Davis – trumpet
- Bernie Glow – trumpet
- Jimmy Nottingham – trumpet
- Wayne Andre – trombone
- Johnny Messner – trombone
- Bill Watrous – trombone
- James Buffington – French horn
- Don Butterfield – tuba
- Stan Webb – clarinet, English horn, saxophone
- Raymond Beckenstein – flute, piccolo, saxophone
- Herbie Hancock – piano
- Al Casamenti – guitar
- Bucky Pizzarelli – guitar
- Richard Davis – double bass
- Grady Tate – drums
- Jack Jennings – vibraphone, castanets, scratching
- Ray Barretto – percussion

Production:

- Creed Taylor – producer
- Don Sebesky – arranger, conductor
- Rudy Van Gelder – engineer
- Gert Van Hoeyen – remastering
- Dennis Drake – remastering
- Ken Whitmore – cover photo, photography

== Chart positions ==
Year	Chart	Peak Position
1967	Billboard Best-Selling Jazz LP's	1
1967	Billboard Hot R&B LP's	4
1967	Billboard Top LP's	65
1967	Cashbox Top 100 Albums	44
