= Tequila (Wes Montgomery album) =

Studio album by Wes Montgomery
- Released: August 1966
- Recorded: March 17–21, 1966
- Studio: Van Gelder Studio, Englewood Cliffs, New Jersey
- Genre: Jazz
- Length: 33:08
- Label: Verve
- Producer: Creed Taylor

Wes Montgomery chronology
| Further Adventures of Jimmy and Wes (1966) | Tequila (1966) | A Day in the Life (1967) |

Tequila is an album recorded by the jazz guitarist Wes Montgomery, released in 1966.

== History ==
Tequila is a mixture of tracks using just a jazz quartet with Ron Carter, Grady Tate and Ray Barretto and the rest with a string section arranged by Claus Ogerman. It is mainly a Latin-flavored album, the first Montgomery recorded without a keyboardist.

It was reissued on CD in 1999 and 2008 with alternate takes that are listed below.

== Chart performance ==
The album debuted on Billboard magazine's Top LP's chart in the issue dated September 3, 1966, peaking at No. 51 during a thirty-two-week run on the chart. In Cashbox the album would peak at No. 54 during a fourteen-week run.

== Reception ==
Professional ratings
Review scores
| Source | Rating |
|---|---|
| AllMusic | 3/5 stars |
| The Penguin Guide to Jazz Recordings | 2.5/4 stars |
| The Rolling Stone Jazz Record Guide | 2/5 stars |

In his AllMusic review, Scott Yanow singled out individual tracks as those giving Montgomery the opportunity to jam and those backed with string arrangements. The few tracks he praises he claims "uplift this album quite a bit beyond the guitarist's later A&M recordings."

Jazz writer Josef Woodard called the album "an airy, melodious record, with the standout track being the gently brooding Montgomery original 'Bumpin' on Sunset', which features him playing double octaves-the same note played in three octaves."

== Track listing ==
1. "Tequila" (Chuck Rio)
2. "Little Child (Daddy Dear)" (Wayne Shanklin)
3. "What the World Needs Now Is Love" (Burt Bacharach, Hal David)
4. "The Big Hurt" (Wayne Shanklin)
5. "Bumpin' on Sunset" (Wes Montgomery)
6. "Insensatez (How Insensitive)" (Vinicius De Moraes, Norman Gimbel, Antônio Carlos Jobim)
7. "The Thumb" (Wes Montgomery)
8. "Midnight Mood" (Ben Raleigh, Joe Zawinul)

== Personnel ==
- Wes Montgomery – guitar
- Ron Carter – bass
- Grady Tate – drums
- Ray Barretto – conga
- George Devens – vibraphone
- Bernard Eichen – violin
- Arnold Eidus – violin
- Paul Gershman – violin
- Emanuel Green – violin
- Julius Held – violin
- Gene Orloff – violin
- Harry Lookofsky – violin
- Joseph Malin – violin
- Abe Kessler – cello
- Charles McCracken – cello
- George Ricci – cello
- Harvey Shapiro – cello

Production notes:

- Creed Taylor – producer
- Claus Ogerman – arranger, conductor
- Rudy Van Gelder – engineer

== Charts ==
| Chart (1966) | Peak position |
|---|---|
| US Billboard Top LPs | 51 |
| US Cashbox Top 100 Albums | 54 |
