= Road Song =

Studio album by Wes Montgomery
- Released: October 1968
- Recorded: May 7 – 9, 1968
- Studio: Van Gelder Studio, Englewood Cliffs, New Jersey
- Genre: Jazz
- Length: 29:44
- Label: A&M
- Producer: Creed Taylor

Wes Montgomery chronology
Down Here on the Ground (1968)	Road Song (1968)	Willow Weep for Me (1969)

Road Song is an album by the jazz guitarist Wes Montgomery, released in 1968. It reached number one on the Billboard Jazz album chart and number 39 on the R&B album chart. It also reached number 94 on the Billboard Top LP's chart. It was his final recording before his death of a heart attack on June 15, 1968.

== Reception ==
Professional ratings
Review scores
Source	Rating
AllMusic	1/5 stars
The Penguin Guide to Jazz Recordings	2/4 stars
The Rolling Stone Jazz Record Guide	2/5 stars

In his AllMusic review, Scott Yanow wrote: "The great guitarist sticks to simple melody statements (with a lot of octaves thrown in) while backed by Don Sebesky's unimaginative arrangements for an orchestra; commercially the combination was a big success… this strictly for-the-money effort can be safely passed by."

== Track listing ==
1. "Road Song" (Wes Montgomery) – 3:53
2. "Greensleeves" (Public Domain, Traditional) – 2:04
3. "Fly Me to the Moon" (Bart Howard) – 2:53
4. "Yesterday" (John Lennon, Paul McCartney) – 3:26
5. "I'll Be Back" (Lennon, McCartney) – 2:33
6. "Scarborough Fair/Canticle" (Paul Simon, Art Garfunkel, Traditional) – 4:55
7. "Green Leaves of Summer" (Dimitri Tiomkin, Paul Francis Webster, Montgomery) – 3:58
8. "Serene" (Montgomery) – 3:10
9. "Where Have All the Flowers Gone?" (Pete Seeger) – 3:06

== Personnel ==
Musicians

- Wes Montgomery – guitar
- Herbie Hancock – piano
- Richard Davis – bass
- Grady Tate – drums
- Ed Shaughnessy – drums
- Ray Barretto – percussion
- Jack Jennings – percussion
- Bernie Glow – trumpet
- Marvin Stamm – trumpet
- Wayne Andre – trombone
- Paul Faulise – trombone
- Donald Ashworth – flute, clarinet, oboe, recorder, English horn
- James Buffington – French horn
- Harvey Estrin – flute, recorder
- Stan Webb – flute, clarinet, oboe, recorder
- George Marge – flute, clarinet, oboe
- Don Hammond – flute, recorder
- Hank Jones – harpsichord, piano
- Walter Kane – bassoon
- Bernard Krainis – recorder
- Eric Leber – harpsichord, recorder
- Bernard Eichen – violin
- Charles Libove – violin
- Tosha Samaroff – violin
- Charles McCracken – cello
- George Ricci – cello
- Alan Shulman – cello
- Emanuel Vardi – viola

Production

- Creed Taylor – producer
- Don Sebesky – arranger, conductor
- Rudy Van Gelder – engineer
- Pete Turner – cover photo, photography
- Sam Antupit – design

== Charts ==
Chart (1968)	Peak position
US Billboard Top LP's	94
US Billboard Best-Selling Jazz LP's	1
US Billboard Hot R&B LP's	39
US Cashbox Top 100 Albums	42
US Record World Top 20 Jazz LP's	1
