= Fingerpickin' =

Compilation album by Wes Montgomery
- Released: 1996
- Recorded: December 30, 1957; April 1958
- Studio: Indianapolis, Indiana; Los Angeles, California
- Genre: Jazz
- Length: 56:09
- Label: Pacific Jazz
- Producer: Richard Bock

Fingerpickin' is an album by the American jazz guitarist Wes Montgomery.

== Background ==
Most of the album's material was recorded in Indianapolis on December 30, 1957. Six songs from this session were subsequently released in 1957 as the album, The Montgomery Brothers and Five Others. The album featured Indianapolis native Freddie Hubbard's recording debut. Three songs ("Stranger in Paradise", "Baubles, Bangles and Beads", and "Not Since Nineveh)" were recorded during a session in Los Angeles on April 22, 1958, and appeared on the album Kismet by The Mastersounds. Montgomery played solos only on these three songs. The Mastersounds was a group that included his brothers Buddy and Monk Montgomery. Wes Montgomery was invited to the session by Richard Bock, the album's producer at Pacific Jazz Records. His composition "Fingerpickin'" appeared on the album.

== Reception ==
Professional ratings
Review scores
| Source | Rating |
|---|---|
| AllMusic | 3/5 stars |
| The Penguin Guide to Jazz Recordings | 3.5/4 stars |

In a AllMusic review, music critic Scott Yanow wrote: "This CD reissues the complete album (which usually has appeared in piecemeal fashion) and finds Wes already quite recognizable. The pretty standard hard bop music... Although this reissue on a whole is not essential, the music is generally enjoyable and the CD will fill some gaps in one's Wes Montgomery collection."

== Track listing ==
All tracks are written by Buddy Montgomery except where noted.

| No. | Title | Length |
|---|---|---|
| 1. | "Sound Carrier" | 6:57 |
| 2. | "Bud's Beaux Arts" | 7:33 |
| 3. | "Bock to Bock" | 10:08 |
| 4. | "Billie's Bounce" (Charlie Parker) | 4:42 |
| 5. | "Lois Ann" | 4:45 |
| 6. | "All the Things You Are" (Jerome Kern/Oscar Hammerstein II) | 3:59 |
| 7. | "Fingerpickin'" (Wes Montgomery) | 2:32 |
| 8. | "Stranger in Paradise" (George Forrest/Robert Wright/Alexander Borodin) | 4:55 |
| 9. | "Baubles, Bangles, & Beads" (Forrest/Wright) | 3:29 |
| 10. | "Not Since Nineveh" (Forrest/Wright) | 7:24 |

== Original release ==
The Montgomery Brothers and Five Others

1. Sound Carrier – 6:55
2. Lois Ann – 4:44
3. Bud's Beaux Arts – 7:32
4. Bock to Bock – 10:08
5. All the Things You Are – 3:58
6. Billie's Bounce – 4:41

== Personnel ==
- Wes Montgomery – guitar
- Freddie Hubbard – trumpet - Tracks 1–4
- Waymon Atkinson – tenor saxophone - Tracks 1–4
- Alonzo Johnson – tenor saxophone - Tracks 1–4
- Buddy Montgomery – vibraphone - Tracks 1–6, 8–10
- Joe Bradley – piano - Tracks 1–5, 7
- Richard Crabtree – piano - Tracks 8–10
- Monk Montgomery – electric bass
- Paul Parker – drums - Tracks 1–7
- Benny Barth – drums - Tracks 8–10
