= The Montgomery Brothers in Canada =

Studio album by The Montgomery Brothers
- Released: 1961
- Recorded: September 16, 1961 at The Cellar, Vancouver, B.C., Canada
- Genre: Jazz
- Label: Fantasy
- Producer: Orrin Keepnews

The Montgomery Brothers chronology
The Montgomery Brothers (1961)	The Montgomery Brothers in Canada (1961)	It's Never Too Late (1961)

The Montgomery Brothers in Canada is an album by The Montgomery Brothers, released in 1961.

The Montgomery Brothers in Canada and The Montgomery Brothers were reissued in 1998 on one CD as a Wes Montgomery release titled Groove Brothers. The original LP had overdubbed crowd noise which was absent on the CD reissue.

== Reception ==
Professional ratings
Review scores
Source	Rating
Allmusic	4.5/5 stars

In a review for Allmusic, critic Richie Unterberger wrote: "It's a solid set of cool but not cold bop with a low-key mood and uniformly tasteful playing... There's only one original on here (by Buddy), but it's a beaut: the buoyant 'Beaux Arts' has gorgeous alternations of single-note solos and chording by Wes. In a different vein, 'Angel Eyes,' which begins with a long drumless passage, shows his skill with a delicate slow ballad."

== Track listing ==
1. "Jeannine" (Duke Pearson)
2. "Snowfall" (Claude Thornhill)
3. "Angel Eyes" (Matt Dennis, Earl Brent)
4. "Barbados" (Charlie Parker)
5. "This Love of Mine" (Sol Parker, Henry W. Jr. Sanicola, Frank Sinatra)
6. "On Green Dolphin Street" (Bronislau Kaper, Ned Washington)
7. "You Don't Know What Love Is" (Gene de Paul, Don Raye)
8. "Beaux Arts (Bud's Beaux Arts)" (Buddy Montgomery)

== Personnel ==
- Buddy Montgomery – vibraphone
- Wes Montgomery – guitar
- Monk Montgomery – double bass
- Paul Humphrey – drums
