= A Day in the Life (Wes Montgomery album) =

Studio album by Wes Montgomery
- Released: September 1967
- Recorded: June 6 & 26, 1967
- Studio: Van Gelder Studio, Englewood Cliffs, New Jersey
- Genre: Jazz
- Length: 34:21
- Label: A&M/CTI
- Producer: Creed Taylor

Wes Montgomery chronology
Tequila (1966)	A Day in the Life (1967)	Down Here on the Ground (1968)

A Day in the Life is an album by the jazz guitarist Wes Montgomery, released in 1967. It reached number one on the Billboard Jazz album chart and number 2 on the R&B album chart. It also reached number 13 on the Billboard Top LP's. The single "Windy" became his biggest Hot 100 hit, peaking at number forty-four.

After recording for Riverside and Verve, Montgomery signed with A&M. His renditions of pop hits were played regularly on Top 40 radio.

== Reception ==
Professional ratings
Review scores
Source	Rating
AllMusic	2.5/5 stars
The Penguin Guide to Jazz Recordings	2.5/4 stars
The Rolling Stone Jazz Record Guide	2/5 stars

In his AllMusic review of the album, Scott Yanow wrote:

In most cases the guitarist did little more than play the melody, using his distinctive octaves, and it was enough to make him saleable. Of his three A&M recordings, A Day in the Life (the first one) was by far the best and, although the jazz content is almost nil, the results are pleasing as background music.

== Track listing ==
No.	Title	Writer(s)	Length
1.	"A Day in the Life"	John Lennon, Paul McCartney	5:45
2.	"Watch What Happens"	Jacques Demy, Norman Gimbel, Michel Legrand	2:43
3.	"When a Man Loves a Woman"	Calvin Lewis, Andrew Wright	2:52
4.	"California Nights"	Marvin Hamlisch, Howard Liebling	2:29
5.	"Angel"	Wes Montgomery	2:46
6.	"Eleanor Rigby"	Lennon, McCartney	3:04
7.	"Willow Weep for Me"	Ann Ronell	4:31
8.	"Windy"	Ruthann Friedman	2:20
9.	"Trust in Me"	Milton Ager, Jean Schwartz, Ned Wever	4:25
10.	"The Joker"	Leslie Bricusse, Anthony Newley	3:26

== Personnel ==
- Wes Montgomery – guitar
- Herbie Hancock – piano
- Ron Carter – bass
- Grady Tate – drums
- Ray Barretto – percussion
- Jack Jennings – percussion
- Joe Wohletz – percussion
- Ray Alonge – French horn
- Phil Bodner – woodwind
- Julius Brand – violin
- Peter Buonconsigilio – violin
- Mac Ceppos – violin
- Lewis Eley – violin
- Harry Glickman – violin
- Harry Katzman – violin
- Leo Krucczek – violin
- Sylvan Shulman – violin
- Gene Orloff – violin
- Tosha Samaroff – violin
- Jack Zayde – violin
- Harry Urbont – violin
- Harold Coletta – viola
- Emanuel Vardi – viola
- George Marge – flute
- Joe Soldo – flute
- Romeo Penque – flute
- Margaret Ross – harp
- Alan Shulman – cello
- Charles McCracken – cello
- Stanley Webb – flute, woodwind

Production notes:

- Creed Taylor – producer
- Don Sebesky – arranger, conductor
- Rudy Van Gelder – engineer
- Pete Turner – photography

== Chart positions ==
Year	Chart	Peak Position
1967	US Billboard Best-Selling Jazz LP's	1
1967	US Billboard Hot R&B LP's	2
1967	US Billboard Top LP's	13
1967	US Cashbox Top 100 Albums	16
