= Groove Yard =

Studio album by The Montgomery Brothers
- Released: 1961
- Recorded: January 3, 1961
- Genre: Jazz
- Label: Riverside
- Producer: Orrin Keepnews

The Montgomery Brothers chronology
Montgomeryland (1958)	Groove Yard (1961)	The Montgomery Brothers (1961)

Groove Yard is an album by The Montgomery Brothers, released in 1961.

== Reception ==
Professional ratings
Review scores
Source	Rating
Allmusic	4/5 stars
The Penguin Guide to Jazz Recordings	3/4 stars

In a review for Allmusic, music critic Ken Dryden wrote: "The guitarist and his brothers are in great form throughout the session in spite of the less-than-ideal piano provided. The highlight of the evening in the studio is a foot-tapping version of Carl Perkins' 'Groove Yard,' followed closely by a wild ride through Harold Land's 'Delirium.'... Like most of Wes Montgomery's Riverside recordings, this release is an essential part of his discography and is highly recommended."

== Track listing ==
1. "Bock to Bock (Back to Back)" (Buddy Montgomery) – 6:48
2. "Groove Yard" (Carl Perkins) – 3:05
3. "If I Should Lose You" (Ralph Rainger, Leo Robin) – 5:52
4. "Delirium" (Harold Land) – 3:41
5. "Just For Now" (Buddy Montgomery) – 5:00
6. "Doujie" (Wes Montgomery) – 4:39
7. "Heart Strings" (Milt Jackson) – 4:38
8. "Remember" (Irving Berlin) – 5:36

The song "Groove Yard" is usually titled "Grooveyard".

== Personnel ==
- Wes Montgomery – guitar
- Buddy Montgomery – piano
- Monk Montgomery – double bass
- Bobby Thomas – drums
