= A Good Git-Together =

Studio album by Jon Hendricks
- Released: 1959
- Recorded: 1959
- Genre: Vocal jazz
- Length: 62:43
- Label: Pacific Jazz
- Producer: Richard Bock

Jon Hendricks chronology
A Good Git-Together (1959)	Evolution of the Blues Song (1960)

Professional ratings
Review scores
Source	Rating
Allmusic	4/5 stars
DownBeat	4/5 stars
The Penguin Guide to Jazz Recordings	3/4 stars

A Good Git-Together is a 1959 studio album by Jon Hendricks. It was Hendricks' first solo album, and featured Cannonball Adderley and Wes Montgomery.

== Track listing ==
1. "Everything Started in the House of the Lord" – 1:03
2. "Music in the Air" (Gigi Gryce) – 3:58
3. "Feed Me" – 3:50
4. "I'll Die Happy" – 2:22
5. "Pretty Strange" (Randy Weston) – 2:53
6. "The Shouter" (Gildo Mahones) – 5:03
7. "Minor Catastrophe" – 5:21
8. "Social Call" (Gryce) – 2:22
9. "Out of the Past" (Benny Golson) – 4:55
10. "A Good Git-Together" – 3:41
11. "I'm Gonna Shout (Everything Started in the House of the Lord)" – 2:26

All songs written by Jon Hendricks, collaborators indicated.

== Personnel ==
- Jon Hendricks – vocals
- Nat Adderley – cornet (2, 5, 6, 8, 9)
- Cannonball Adderley – alto saxophone (2, 5, 6, 8, 9)
- Pony Poindexter – alto saxophone, vocals (1, 3, 4, 7, 10, 11)
- Wes Montgomery – guitar
- Gildo Mahones – piano
- Ike Isaacs – double bass (1, 4, 7)
- Monk Montgomery – double bass (2, 3, 5, 6, 8–11)
- Walter Bolden – drums (2, 3, 5, 6, 8–11)
- Jimmy Wormworth – drums (1, 4, 7)
