= George Shearing and the Montgomery Brothers =

Studio album by George Shearing & The Montgomery Brothers
- Released: 1961
- Recorded: October 9 & 10, 1961 in Los Angeles
- Genre: Jazz
- Length: 48:44
- Label: Jazzland JLP 55
- Producer: Orrin Keepnews

George Shearing & The Montgomery Brothers chronology
On the Sunny Side of the Strip (1960)	George Shearing and the Montgomery Brothers (1961)	Jazz Moments (1962)

George Shearing and the Montgomery Brothers is an album by Anglo-American jazz pianist George Shearing and jazz trio The Montgomery Brothers, released in 1961.

== Reception ==
Professional ratings
Review scores
Source	Rating
Allmusic	4/5 stars

In his Allmusic review, music critic Scott Yanow called the album an "enjoyable if slightly lightweight outing." with "some fine soloing by the principals."

== Track listing ==
1. "Love Walked In" (George Gershwin, Ira Gershwin) – 2:10
2. "Love for Sale" (Cole Porter) – 3:32
3. "No Hard Feelings" (Buddy Montgomery) – 3:45
4. "Enchanted" (George Shearing) – 3:41
5. "Stranger in Paradise" (Alexander Borodin, Robert Wright, George Forrest) – 4:47
6. "The Lamp Is Low" (Maurice Ravel, Peter de Rose, Mitchell Parish, Bert Shefter) – 2:11
7. "Double Deal" (Wes Montgomery) – 3:47
8. "And Then I Wrote" (Shearing) – 3:15
9. "Darn That Dream" (Eddie DeLange, Jimmy Van Heusen) – 4:18
10. "Lois Ann" (Buddy Montgomery) – 3:08
11. "Mambo in Chimes" (Armando Peraza) – 2:26

=== CD Reissue ===
1. "Love Walked In" – 2:12
2. "Love Walked In" [Take 1] – 3:41
3. "Love for Sale" – 3:31
4. "No Hard Feelings" – 3:49
5. "Enchanted" – 3:38
6. "Stranger in Paradise" – 4:52
7. "The Lamp Is Low" – 2:15
8. "Double Deal" – 3:48
9. "And Then I Wrote" – 3:19
10. "Darn That Dream" – 4:21
11. "Darn That Dream" [Take 1] – 4:14
12. "Lois Ann" – 3:12
13. "Mambo in Chimes" – 2:30
14. "Mambo in Chimes" [Take 1] – 4:07

== Personnel ==
- George Shearing – piano
- Buddy Montgomery – vibraphone
- Wes Montgomery – guitar
- Monk Montgomery – bass
- Walter Perkins – drums (1–5, 7–10)
- Armando Peraza – bongos, conga (5, 6, 11)
- Ricardo Chimelis – bongos, conga, timbales (5, 6, 11)

Production notes:

- Orrin Keepnews – producer, liner notes
- Wally Heider – engineer
- Joe Tarantino – mastering
- William Claxton – photography
- Ken Deardoff – design
