= Down Here on the Ground =

1968 studio album by Wes Montgomery

Studio album by Wes Montgomery
- Released: April 1968
- Recorded: December 20, 1967 – January 26, 1968
- Studios: Van Gelder Studio, Englewood Cliffs, New Jersey
- Genre: Jazz
- Length: 31:11
- Label: A&M
- Producer: Creed Taylor

Wes Montgomery chronology
A Day in the Life (1967)	Down Here on the Ground (1968)	Road Song (1968)

Down Here on the Ground is an album by the jazz guitarist Wes Montgomery, released in 1968. It reached number one on the Billboard Jazz album chart and number 4 on the R&B album chart. It also reached number 38 on the Billboard Top LP's.

The title track is Montgomery's version of the theme from the movie Cool Hand Luke, composed by Lalo Schifrin.

== Reception ==
Professional ratings
Review scores
Source	Rating
AllMusic	3/5 stars
The Penguin Guide to Jazz Recordings	2/4 stars
The Rolling Stone Jazz Record Guide	2/5 stars

In 1968, DownBeat magazine jazz critic Dan Morgenstern wrote a four-star review

In a 2010 AllMusic online review, Michael G. Nastos wrote:

... This is the beginning of the end for Montgomery as a jazz artist, and the inception of bachelor pad lounge/mood music that only lasted for a brief time... It does fall in that category of recordings where the musicians chose to produce, rather than create their personal brand of jazz, and is at the very least an historical footnote.

== Track listing ==
1. "Wind Song" (Herb Alpert, Nick Ceroli, Neil Larsen, John Pisano, Paul Francis Webster) – 2:22
2. "Georgia on My Mind" (Hoagy Carmichael, Stuart Gorrell) – 2:46
3. "The Other Man's Grass Is Always Greener" (Tony Hatch, Jackie Trent) – 2:36
4. "Down Here on the Ground" (Lalo Schifrin, Gale Garnett) – 3:42
5. "Up and at It" (Wes Montgomery) – 4:15
6. "Goin' on to Detroit" (Montgomery) – 3:38
7. "I Say a Little Prayer for You" (Burt Bacharach, Hal David) – 3:18
8. "When I Look in Your Eyes" (Leslie Bricusse) – 3:11
9. "Know It All (Quem Diz Que Sabe)" (João Donato, Paulo Valle) – 2:59
10. "The Fox" (Lalo Schifrin) – 2:56

== Personnel ==
- Wes Montgomery – guitar
- Herbie Hancock – piano
- Ron Carter – bass
- Grady Tate – drums
- Ray Barretto – percussion
- Hubert Laws – flute, oboe
- George Marge – flute, oboe
- Romeo Penque – flute, oboe
- Bobby Rosengarden – percussion
- Mike Mainieri – vibraphone
- Gene Orloff – violin
- Raoul Poliakin – violin
- George Ricci – cello
- Emanuel Vardi – viola

Production notes:

- Creed Taylor – producer
- Don Sebesky – arranger, conductor
- Eumir Deodato – arranger, conductor
- Rudy Van Gelder – engineer
- Kevin Reeves – mastering
- John Synder – remastering
- Pete Turner – cover photo, photography
- Isabelle Wong – design
- Sam Antupit – design
- Hollis King – art direction
- Andy Kman – production coordinator
- Harry Weinger – reissue supervisor

== Chart positions ==
Year	Chart	Peak Position
1968	US Billboard Best-Selling Jazz LP's	1
1968	US Billboard Hot R&B LP's	4
1968	US Billboard Top LP's	38
1968	US Cashbox Top 100 Albums	38
