= Goin' Out of My Head (album) =

Studio album by Wes Montgomery
- Released: February 1966
- Recorded: November 20 and December 7, 8 & 22, 1965
- Studios: Van Gelder Studio, Englewood Cliffs, New Jersey
- Genre: Jazz
- Length: 35:40
- Label: Verve
- Producer: Creed Taylor

Wes Montgomery chronology
Smokin' Guitar (1965)	Goin' Out of My Head (1966)	California Dreaming (1966)

Goin' Out of My Head is an album by American jazz guitarist Wes Montgomery that was released in 1966. It reached No. 7 on the Billboard magazine R&B album chart. At the 9th Grammy Awards Goin' Out of My Head won the Grammy Award for Best Jazz Instrumental Album, Individual or Group.

== History ==
Goin' Out of My Head was Montgomery's first album with sales reaching near one million. It was producer Creed Taylor's idea that Montgomery should do a cover of the title song, a 1964 hit by Little Anthony and the Imperials. At the time Taylor brought the song to Montgomery, he was playing at the Half Note Club in New York City with the Wynton Kelly Trio—sessions that appeared on the guitarist's 1965 release Smokin' at the Half Note. Taylor said in a later interview: "If you take away the R&B performance and just look at that song, it's an absolutely marvelous song to improvise on. For that time, it had sophisticated changes and the whole structure was great. I was thinking, 'This would be perfect for Wes Montgomery. But how am I going to overcome the fact that here's Wes and his background? He'd be about the last person to listen to Little Anthony and the Imperials.'"

== Reception ==
Professional ratings
Review scores
Source	Rating
Down Beat (Original Lp release)	4/5 stars
Allmusic	2/5 stars
The Rolling Stone Jazz Record Guide	2/5 stars

In his Allmusic review, critic Scott Yanow described Montgomery's album as "little more than a pleasant melody statement... Recordings like this one disheartened the jazz world but made him a household name and a staple on AM radio. Heard three decades later, the recording is at its best when serving as innocuous background music."

Jazz writer Josef Woodard called the release: "Commercial firepower and Grammy-winning accessibility notwithstanding, it's a classic big-band album, with smart charts by Nelson and stolen moments of Montgomery's guitar grandeur and romantic truth scattered throughout. The title track that made so much commercial and critical noise is all of 2:12 in duration, but the album also features plenty of jazz fiber."

At the 9th Grammy Awards Goin' Out of My Head won the Grammy Award for Best Jazz Instrumental Album, Individual or Group.

== Track listing ==
1. "Goin' Out of My Head" (Teddy Randazzo, Bobby Weinstein) – 2:14
2. "Once I Loved" (Incorrectly titled " O Morro Não Tem Vez") (Vinicius De Moraes, Antonio Carlos Jobim) – 4:46
3. "Boss City" (Wes Montgomery) – 3:46
4. "Chim Chim Cher-ee" (Richard M. Sherman, Robert B. Sherman) (From Disney's Mary Poppins) – 4:51
5. "Naptown Blues" (Montgomery) – 3:08
6. "Twisted Blues" (Montgomery) – 4:15
7. "End of a Love Affair" (Edward Redding) – 3:43
8. "It Was a Very Good Year" (Ervin Drake) – 3:43
9. "Golden Earrings" (Ray Evans, Jay Livingston, Victor Young) – 5:14

== Personnel ==
- Wes Montgomery – guitar
- Phil Woods – alto saxophone and clarinet
- Jerry Dodgion – alto saxophone, clarinet, flute and piccolo
- Bob Ashton – tenor saxophone, clarinet and flute
- Romeo Penque – tenor saxophone, flute, clarinet, English horn, oboe and piccolo
- Danny Bank – baritone saxophone, flute, alto flute and bass clarinet
- Ernie Royal – trumpet
- Joe Newman – trumpet
- Donald Byrd – trumpet
- Danny Moore – trumpet
- Jimmy Cleveland – trombone
- Quentin Jackson – trombone
- Wayne Andre – trombone
- Tony Studd – bass trombone
- Herbie Hancock – piano
- Roger Kellaway – piano
- George Duvivier – bass
- Grady Tate – drums
- Candido Camero – congas
- Oliver Nelson – arranger, conductor

Production notes:

- Creed Taylor – producer
- Rudy Van Gelder – engineer
- Orrin Keepnews – original liner notes

== Chart positions ==
Year	Chart	Position
1966	US Billboard Hot R&B LP's	7
1966	US Cashbox Top 100 Albums	74
