= Movin' Wes =

Studio album by Wes Montgomery
- Released: 1964
- Recorded: November 11, 16, 1964
- Studio: A&R Studios, New York City
- Genre: Jazz
- Label: Verve
- Producer: Creed Taylor

Wes Montgomery chronology
| The Alternative Wes Montgomery (1963) | Movin' Wes (1964) | Bumpin' (1965) |

Movin' Wes is an album by the American jazz guitarist Wes Montgomery, released in 1964. It reached number 18 on the Billboard jazz albums chart in 1967, his second album to reach the charts after Bumpin'.

== History ==
Movin' Wes was Montgomery's debut album on the Verve label. Produced by Creed Taylor, the album sold more than 100,000 copies initially; it was Montgomery's biggest seller to this point in his career.

== Reception ==
Professional ratings
Review scores
| Source | Rating |
|---|---|
| AllMusic | 3/5 stars |
| The Penguin Guide to Jazz Recordings | 3/4 stars |
| Record Mirror | 4/5 stars |
| The Rolling Stone Jazz Record Guide | 4/5 stars |

In his AllMusic review, Scott Yanow wrote: "Wes Montgomery's debut for Verve, although better from a jazz standpoint than his later A&M releases, is certainly in the same vein. The emphasis is on his tone, his distinctive octaves, and his melody statements."

== Track listing ==
1. "Caravan" (Duke Ellington, Irving Mills, Juan Tizol) – 2:39
2. "People" (Bob Merrill, Jule Styne) – 4:23
3. "Movin' Wes, Pt. 1" (Wes Montgomery) – 3:31
4. "Moça Flor" (Durval Ferreira, Lula Freire) – 3:12
5. "Matchmaker, Matchmaker" (Jerry Bock, Sheldon Harnick) – 2:52
6. "Movin' Wes, Pt. 2" (Montgomery) – 2:55
7. "Senza Fine" (Gino Paoli, Alec Wilder) – 3:28
8. "Theodora" (Billy Taylor) – 3:58
9. "In and Out" (Montgomery) – 2:53
10. "Born to Be Blue" (Mel Tormé, Robert Wells) – 3:40
11. "West Coast Blues" (Montgomery) – 3:12

== Personnel ==
- Wes Montgomery – guitar
- Ernie Royal – trumpet
- Clark Terry – trumpet
- Snooky Young – trumpet
- Jimmy Cleveland – trombone
- Urbie Green – trombone
- Quentin Jackson – trombone
- Chauncey Welsch – trombone
- Don Butterfield – tuba
- Harvey Phillips – tuba
- Jerome Richardson – woodwinds
- Bobby Scott – piano
- Bob Cranshaw – bass
- Grady Tate – drums
- Willie Bobo – percussion

Production

- Creed Taylor – producer
- Rudy Van Gelder – engineer
- Phil Ramone – engineer
- Johnny Pate – arranger, conductor

== Chart positions ==
| Year | Chart | Position |
|---|---|---|
| 1967 | Billboard Top Jazz Albums | 18 |
