= Bumpin' (Wes Montgomery album) =

Studio album by Wes Montgomery
- Released: 1965
- Recorded: March 16, May 18, 19 & 20, 1965
- Studio: Van Gelder Studio, Englewood Cliffs, New Jersey
- Genre: Jazz
- Length: 31:14
- Label: Verve
- Producer: Creed Taylor

Wes Montgomery chronology
Movin' Wes (1964)	Bumpin' (1965)	Smokin' at the Half Note (1965)

Alternative cover

Bumpin' is an album by the American jazz guitarist Wes Montgomery, released in 1965. It reached number 116 on the Billboard Top LP's chart. It was Montgomery's first album to reach the charts.

== Reception ==
Professional ratings
Review scores
Source	Rating
AllMusic	4.5/5 stars
The Penguin Guide to Jazz Recordings	3/4 stars
The Rolling Stone Jazz Record Guide	3/5 stars

In his AllMusic review, Shawn M. Haney praised the album: "Not only is his brilliant command of the six-string present here, so is the vivid color tones of notes and blue notes played between. Backed up by a hauntingly beautiful and mesmerizing orchestra conducted and arranged by Don Sebesky, the music almost lifts the listener off his feet into a dreamy, water-like landscape. The atmosphere is serene and enchanting, such as a romantic evening for two under starlight, and certainly a romantic eve merits the accompaniment of this record... The recording engineer did a wonderful job with this album. The sound quality is clear and lush, and, overall, this collection of mid-'60s Latin jazz is a delight to listen to, once and again."

== Track listing ==
1. "Bumpin'" (Wes Montgomery) – 6:40
2. "Tear It Down" (Montgomery) – 3:10
3. "A Quiet Thing" (Fred Ebb, John Kander) – 3:27
4. "Con Alma" (Dizzy Gillespie) – 3:25
5. "The Shadow of Your Smile" (Johnny Mandel, Paul Francis Webster) – 2:15
6. "Mi Cosa" (Montgomery) – 3:15
7. "Here's That Rainy Day" (Johnny Burke, Jimmy Van Heusen) – 4:50
8. "Musty" (Don Sebesky) – 4:12

Bonus tracks on the CD release

9. "Just Walkin'" – 3:00
10. "My One and Only Love" (Robert Mellin, Guy Wood) – 4:09
11. "Just Walkin'" [alternate take] – 3:37

== Personnel ==
- Wes Montgomery – guitar
- Bob Cranshaw – bass
- Grady Tate – drums
- Harry Lookofsky – violin
- David Schwartz – viola
- Charles McCracken – cello
- Margaret Ross – harp
- Roger Kellaway – piano
- Don Sebesky – arranger, conductor
- Candido Camero – bongos, congas
- Harold Coletta – viola
- Arnold Eidus – violin
- Lewis Eley – violin
- Paul Gershman – violin
- Louis Haber – violin
- Julius Held – violin
- Joseph Malignaggi – violin
- Helcio Milito – drums
- Gene Orloff – violin
- George Ricci – violin, cello
- Sol Shapiro – violin

== Chart positions ==
Year	Chart	Peak Position
1966	Billboard Top LP's	116
