= Willow Weep for Me (album) =

Studio album by Wes Montgomery
- Released: December 1968
- Recorded: 1965
- Genre: Jazz
- Label: Verve
- Producer: Esmond Edwards

Wes Montgomery chronology
Road Song (1968)	Willow Weep for Me (1968)

Willow Weep for Me is a posthumous jazz album recorded by guitarist Wes Montgomery in 1965 and released in 1968. It reached number 12 on the Billboard Jazz album chart in 1969. At the Grammy Awards of 1970 Willow Weep for Me won the Grammy Award for Best Jazz Instrumental Album, Individual or Group.

== History ==
After Montgomery's death, Verve used recordings from the sessions that produced Smokin' at the Half Note and hired arranger Claus Ogerman to write string and brass arrangements for "Willow Weep for Me", "Portrait of Jennie," "Oh! You Crazy Moon," and "Misty." Subsequent reissues erased the new backing arrangements.

== Reception ==
Professional ratings
Review scores
Source	Rating
Allmusic	3/5 stars
The Penguin Guide to Jazz Recordings	3/4 stars

Writing for Allmusic, music critic Richard Grinell called the original release "... prime, mature Wes Montgomery stretching out in full, with unbelievable confidence in his ear and technique at all times, experimenting now and then with mild electronic effects devices. The sound is oddly dim and shallow on the LP, which is surprising since the Smokln' album sounded so good."

At the Grammy Awards of 1970 Willow Weep for Me won the Grammy Award for Best Jazz Instrumental Album, Individual or Group.

== Track listing ==
1. "Willow Weep for Me" (Ann Ronell) – 7:42
2. "Impressions" (John Coltrane) – 5:01
3. "Portrait of Jenny" (Burdge, Robinson) – 2:45
4. "The Surrey with the Fringe on Top" (Richard Rodgers, Oscar Hammerstein II) – 5:20
5. "Oh, You Crazy Moon" (Burke, Jimmy Van Heusen) – 5:27
6. "Four on Six" (Wes Montgomery) – 9:29
7. "Misty" (Johnny Burke, Erroll Garner) – 6:45

== Personnel ==
- Wes Montgomery – guitar
- Wynton Kelly – piano
- Paul Chambers – bass
- Jimmy Cobb – drums
- Claus Ogerman – arranger, conductor

== Chart positions ==
Year	Chart	Peak Position
1969	Billboard Jazz Albums	12
