= One Night in Indy =

Live album by Wes Montgomery and the Eddie Higgins Trio
- Released: January 15, 2016
- Recorded: January 18, 1959
- Venue: Indianapolis Jazz Club, Indianapolis, Indiana
- Genre: hard bop
- Length: 41:53
- Language: Instrumental
- Label: Resonance
- Producer: Zev Feldman

Wes Montgomery and the Eddie Higgins Trio chronology
Echoes of Indiana Avenue (2012)	One Night in Indy (2016)

One Night in Indy is a live album released in 2016 by Resonance Records that features Wes Montgomery and the Eddie Higgins Trio and comprises recordings made in 1959. The album was a promotion for Record Store Day and has received positive reviews.

== Reception ==
Stephen Thomas Erlewine of AllMusic gave the album 3.5 out of five stars, citing the exciting tempo and the "mellow yet lively interplay" between musicians as strengths while criticizing the quality of the audio. Writing for JazzTimes, Colin Fleming praised Montgomery's virtuosity and Higgins' piano work. In PopMatters, John Paul awarded the recording 7/10, agreeing that the stars are Higgins and Montgomery, summing up, "Hearing these two giants together, while not quite at the level of Coltrane and Monk, is nonetheless a thrillingly enjoyable spectacle."

== Track listing ==
1. "Give Me the Simple Life" (Rube Bloom and Harry Ruby) – 9:15
2. "Prelude to a Kiss" (Duke Ellington, Irving Gordon, and Irving Mills) – 5:52
3. "Stompin' at the Savoy" (Benny Goodman, Edgar Sampson, and Chick Webb) – 7:12
4. "Li'l Darling" (Neal Hefti) – 8:09
5. "Ruby, My Dear" (Thelonious Monk) – 8:34
6. "You'd Be Nice to Come Home To" (Cole Porter) – 2:51

== Personnel ==
- Wes Montgomery – bandleader, guitar
- Eddie Higgins – piano
- Walter Perkins – drums
- unknown musician – double bass

Technical personnel

- Zev Feldman – liner notes, production
- Fran Gala – mixing, restoration
- Bernie Grundman – mastering
- George Klabin – executive production, mixing, restoration
- Robert Montgomery – associate production
- Sydney B. Lanex – production assistance
- Duncan Schiedt – engineering
- Burton Yount – art direction, design

== See also ==
- 2016 in jazz
- List of 2016 albums
