= Wes Montgomery: The Complete Riverside Recordings =

The Complete Riverside Recordings

Box set by Wes Montgomery
- Released: 1992
- Recorded: October 5, 1959 – November 27, 1963
- Genre: Jazz
- Length: 805:05
- Label: Riverside
- Producer: Orrin Keepnews

The Complete Riverside Recordings is a box set of American jazz guitarist Wes Montgomery's early recordings on the Riverside label. It is a twelve-CD box set and was released in 1992. It contains 157 songs and includes 15 previously unissued performances, six re-edited versions of previously issued numbers and 29 alternate takes. The extensive liner notes by producer Orrin Keepnews and Jim Ferguson, session notes, and photographs. Keepnews and Ferguson received a Grammy Award nomination for Best Album Notes.

The collection covers Montgomery's recordings from 1959 until late 1963 before he moved to the Verve label. The recordings made during this period are considered by fans and jazz historians to be his best and most influential. It includes recordings with his siblings Monk and Buddy, Tommy Flanagan, Nat and Cannonball Adderley, Milt Jackson, George Shearing, Johnny Griffin and many others.

== Reception ==
Professional ratings
Review scores
Source	Rating
Allmusic	5/5 stars
The Penguin Guide to Jazz Recordings	4/4 stars

In his Allmusic review, critic Scott Yanow stated, "All in all, there is a tremendous amount of rewarding performances included in this essential set, most of which show why Wes Montgomery is still considered one of the all-time great jazz guitarists."

Writing for the Los Angeles Times, Zan Stewart praised the box-set, writing "Time has done little to diminish the elegant charm that Montgomery offered in his ardently swinging improvisations. On a ballad such as "Born to be Blue," he could be relaxed and luxuriant. For a blues, he was straightforward and melodic, never opting for funk cliches, while on the up tempos he displayed a rippling muscularity... a must-have for the jazz guitar enthusiast."

== Personnel ==
- Wes Montgomery – guitar
- Cannonball Adderley – alto saxophone
- Nat Adderley – cornet
- Ray Barretto – conga
- George Brown – drums
- Bobby Thomas – drums
- Jimmy Cobb – drums
- Louis Hayes – drums
- Lex Humphries – drums
- Albert "Tootie" Heath – drums
- Walter Perkins – drums
- Osie Johnson – drums
- Ricardo Chimelis – bongos, timbales
- Paul Parker – drums
- Armando Peraza – conga
- Ray Brown – bass
- Ron Carter – bass
- Paul Chambers – bass
- Milt Hinton – bass
- Percy Heath – bass
- Monk Montgomery – bass
- Sam Jones – bass
- Kenny Burrell – guitar
- James Clay – flute, tenor sax
- Victor Feldman – piano, vibraphone
- George Shearing – piano
- Bobby Timmons – piano
- Tommy Flanagan – piano
- Buddy Montgomery – piano
- Wynton Kelly – piano
- Barry Harris – piano
- Dick Hyman – piano, celeste
- Milt Jackson – vibraphone
- Hank Jones – piano, celeste
- Melvin Rhyne – organ
- Joe Gordon – trumpet
- Harold Land – tenor saxophone
- Leo Kruczek – violin
- Harry Lookofsky – violin
- David Nadien – violin
- Gene Orloff – violin
- Raoul Poliakin – violin
- Samuel Rand – violin
- Sylvan Shulman – violin
- Mac Ceppos – violin
- Winston Collymore – violin
- Arnold Eidus – violin
- Paul Winter – violin
- Isadore Zir – violin
- Burt Fisch – viola
- Ralph Hersh – viola
- Alfred Brown – viola
- George Ricci – cello
- Kermit Moore – cello
- Lucien Schmit – cello
- Charles McCracken – cello player
- Gloria Agostini – harp
- Margaret Rose – harp
- Phil Bodner – woodwind

Production notes:

- Orrin Keepnews – producer, liner notes
- Jim Ferguson – liner notes
- Jimmy Jones – arranger, conductor
