= Far Wes =

Studio album by Wes Montgomery
- Released: 1990
- Recorded: 1958
- Genre: Jazz
- Length: 51:25 (Reissue)
- Label: Pacific Jazz

Far Wes is a reissue of Montgomeryland, a 1958 album by the American jazz group the Montgomery Brothers, including guitarist Wes Montgomery.

== Reception ==
Professional ratings
Review scores
Source	Rating
AllMusic	4.5/5 stars
The Penguin Guide to Jazz Recordings	3/4 stars

In his AllMusic review, music critic Scott Yanow called Far Wes a "historical album" and wrote Montgomery's "sound was already quite recognizable."

== Track listing ==
1. "Far Wes" (Wes Montgomery) – 5:51
2. "Leila" (Montgomery) – 3:28
3. "Old Folks" (Willard Robison, Dedette Hill) – 6:35
4. "Wes' Tune" (Montgomery) – 4:08
5. "Hymn for Carl" (Harold Land) – 4:33
6. "Montgomeryland Funk" (Montgomery) – 4:00
7. "Stompin' at the Savoy" (Edgar Sampson, Benny Goodman, Chick Webb) – 4:22
8. "Monk's Shop" (Montgomery) – 3:54
9. "Summertime" (George Gershwin, DuBose Heyward) – 4:50
10. "Falling in Love with Love" (Richard Rodgers, Lorenz Hart) – 6:13
11. "Renie" (Montgomery) – 3:31

== Original release track listing ==
1. Monk's Shop - 3:58
2. Summertime - 4:53
3. Falling in Love - 6:16
4. Renie - 3:33
5. Far Wes - 5:55
6. Leila - 3:30
7. Old Folks - 6:38
8. Wes' Tune - 4:11

== Personnel ==
- Wes Montgomery – guitar
- Pony Poindexter – alto saxophone (tracks 8–11)
- Harold Land – tenor saxophone (tracks 1–7)
- Buddy Montgomery – piano
- Monk Montgomery – electric bass
- Tony Bazley – drums (tracks 1–7)
- Louis Hayes – drums (tracks 8–11)

== Releases ==
Light Music Club PLP-804 (original release)
