= Melvin Rhyne =

American jazz organist (1936–2013)

- Born: October 12, 1936; Indianapolis, Indiana, U.S.
- Died: March 5, 2013 (aged 76) Indianapolis
- Genres: Jazz
- Occupation: Musician
- Instrument: Organ
- Years active: 1955–2013
- Labels: Riverside, Criss Cross

Melvin Rhyne (October 12, 1936 – March 5, 2013), was a jazz organist best known for his work with Wes Montgomery.

== Biography ==
Melvin Rhyne was born in Indianapolis in 1936 and started playing the piano shortly after. At 19 years old, Rhyne started playing piano with then-unknown tenor saxophonist Rahsaan Roland Kirk but quickly switched over to the instrument that would make him famous: the Hammond B3 organ. Rhyne's piano skills translated to the organ fluently and before long he was backing famous blues players like B.B. King and T-Bone Walker. In 1959 he was asked to join fellow Indianapolis musician Wes Montgomery's newly formed trio.

Rhyne then moved to Wisconsin and largely kept to himself for the next two decades. In 1991, however, he played on Herb Ellis's album Roll Call, Brian Lynch's At the Main Event, and his own album, The Legend. He continued to be prolific in the years to come, releasing eight more solo albums on the Criss Cross Jazz label. Rhyne also recorded with The Mark Ladley Trio for the 1992 release, Strictly Business and the 1993 release, Evidence. Both landed in the Jazz Charts at CMJ New Music Report and The Gavin Report. The group also appeared on a Jazziz Magazine sampler disc during that time. Altenburgh Records posthumously released, Final Call in 2013 by the same group.

In 2008 Rhyne teamed up with fellow Indianapolis jazz musician Rob Dixon to form the Dixon-Rhyne Project, a boundary-pushing jazz quartet that also includes Chicago guitarist Fareed Haque and drummer Kenny Phelps. The quartet released the album Reinvention in 2008 on Indianapolis jazz label Owl Studios. Rhyne's later career trio included guitarist Peter Bernstein and drummer Kenny Washington in the same organ, guitar, drum formation of the original Wes Montgomery Trio.

He died in his hometown of Indianapolis of lung cancer at the age of 76.

== Discography ==
Year	Artist	Title	Label
1959	The Wes Montgomery Trio	Guitar on the Go	Riverside
1959	The Wes Montgomery Trio	Round Midnight	Riverside
1960	Melvin Rhyne	Organ-izing	Jazzland
1963	The Wes Montgomery Trio	Boss Guitar	Riverside
1963	The Wes Montgomery Trio	Portrait of Wes	Riverside
1969	Johnny Shacklett	At the Hofman House	Universal Artists
1969	Buddy Montgomery	This Rather Than That	Impulse!
1991	Herb Ellis	Roll Call	Justice Records
1991	Brian Lynch Quintet	At the Main Event	Criss Cross
1991	Melvin Rhyne Trio	The Legend	Criss Cross
1992	Mark Ladley Trio	Strictly Business	Altenburgh Records
1992	Melvin Rhyne	To Cannonball with Love	Paddle Wheel
1993	Ronald Muldrow	Yesterdays	Enja
1993	Mark Ladley Trio	Evidence	Altenburgh
1993	Mark Ladley Trio	"Coop's Blues"	Jazziz (Sampler Disc, Vol. 7)
1993	Melvin Rhyne Quartet	Boss Organ	Criss Cross
1993	The Tenor Triangle with The Melvin Rhyne Trio	Tell it Like it Is	Criss Cross
1994	The Tenor Triangle with The Melvin Rhyne Trio	Aztec Blues	Criss Cross
1994	Project G-5	A Tribute to Wes Montgomery	Evidence
1995	Eric Alexander Quartet	In Europe	Criss Cross
1995	Royce Campbell Trio	Make Me Rainbows	Positive
1995	Melvin Rhyne Trio	Mel's Spell	Criss Cross
1995	Melvin Rhyne Quintet	Stick to the Kick	Criss Cross
1998	Juli Wood Quintet (feat. Mel Rhyne)	Movin' and Groovin'	Juli Wood Productions
1999	Melvin Rhyne Trio	Kojo	Criss Cross
1999	Mel Rhyne (feat. Royce Campbell)	Remembering Wes	Savant
2000	Melvin Rhyne Quartet	Classmasters	Criss Cross
2004	Melvin Rhyne Trio	Tomorrow Yesterday Today	Criss Cross
2006	Killer Ray Appleton–Melvin Rhyne Quartet	Latin Dreams	Lineage
2007	Melvin Rhyne Trio	Front & Center	Criss Cross
2008	The Dixon–Rhyne Project (with Rob Dixon and Fareed Haque)	Reinvention	Owl Studios
2009	Kyle Asche Organ Trio (feat. Mel Rhyne)	Blues For Mel	Tippin'
2013	Mark Ladley Trio	Final Call	Altenburgh
