= Montgomery Brothers =

American jazz trio (1950s–1960s)

The Montgomery Brothers
- Origin: Indianapolis
- Genres: Jazz
- Years active: 1950s–1960s
- Labels: Columbia, Pacific Jazz, Riverside, Fantasy, Jazzland
- Past members: Wes Montgomery; Buddy Montgomery; Monk Montgomery

The Montgomery Brothers were an American jazz trio consisting of the brothers Wes Montgomery (electric guitar, 1923–1968), Buddy Montgomery (piano, vibraphone, 1930–2009), and Monk Montgomery (electric bass, double bass, 1921–1982).

During the mid-1950s, they were members of the Montgomery-Johnson Quintet with Alonzo Johnson and Robert "Sonny" Johnson.

Recordings from these early years, including sessions produced by Quincy Jones in 1955, were released later, including as Wes Montgomery's In The Beginning (Resonance, 2015).

From 1957 to 1960, they recorded as the Mastersounds, then as the Montgomery Brothers.

== Discography ==
- 1957: The Montgomery Brothers and Five Others (Pacific Jazz)
- 1960: Montgomeryland (Pacific Jazz)
- 1961: Groove Yard (Riverside)
- 1961: The Montgomery Brothers (Fantasy)
- 1961: The Montgomery Brothers in Canada (Fantasy)
- 1961: Wes, Buddy and Monk Montgomery (Pacific Jazz)
- 1961: George Shearing and the Montgomery Brothers (Jazzland)
