= Wes Montgomery =

American jazz guitarist (1923–1968)

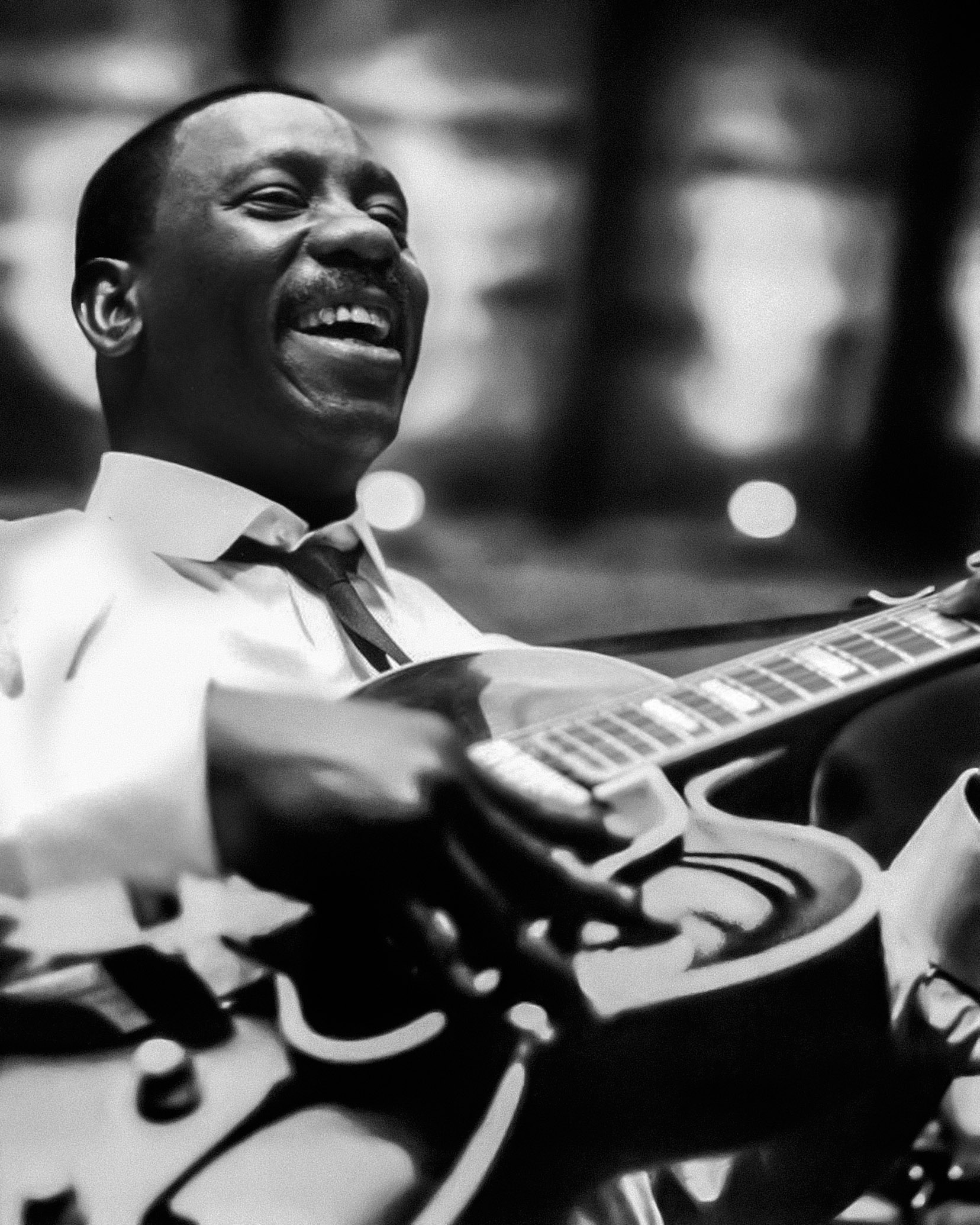
- Photo of Montgomery during a recording session in the mid-1960s

Background information
- Born: John Leslie Montgomery; March 6, 1923; Indianapolis, Indiana, U.S.
- Died: June 15, 1968 (aged 45) Indianapolis, Indiana, U.S.
- Genre: Jazz
- Occupation: Musician
- Instrument: Guitar
- Years active: 1947–1968
- Labels: Pacific Jazz, Riverside, Verve, A&M
- Website: wesmontgomery.com

John Leslie "Wes" Montgomery (March 6, 1923 – June 15, 1968) was an American jazz guitarist. He is most known for his unusual technique of plucking the strings with the side of his thumb and for his extensive use of octaves, which gave him a distinctive sound. Montgomery often worked with his brothers Buddy (Charles F.) and Monk (William H.), as well as organist Melvin Rhyne. His recordings up to 1965 were oriented toward hard bop, soul jazz, and post bop, but around 1965 he began recording more pop-oriented instrumental albums that found mainstream success. His later guitar style influenced jazz fusion and smooth jazz.

== Early life and education ==
Montgomery was born in Indianapolis, Indiana, where a historical marker at the Northwest corner of 10th Street and Bellefontaine Street commemorates his birth. He was the third son of Thomas and Francis Blackman Montgomery. Both of his parents are known to have migrated from Floyd County, Georgia during the Great Migration and, after marrying in Indiana, they established their household through Thomas' work at the National Malleable & Steel Castings Company. According to NPR, the nickname "Wes" was a child's mispronunciation of his middle name, Leslie.

Documents from the newspaper Indianapolis Recorder make note of his parents hosting practice sessions for a folk and vocal group, the Blackburn Quartette, in 1926. However, their family was large, and his parents split up early during his childhood in 1932, possibly due to the Great Depression, according to statements by descendant Robert Montgomery in a PBS documentary. Wes and his brothers moved to Columbus, Ohio with their father, and attended Champion High School. His mother and his sisters remained in Indianapolis. His older brother Monk around this time dropped out of school to sell coal and ice, gradually saving enough money to buy Wes a four-string tenor guitar from a pawn shop in 1935. Although Montgomery spent many hours playing that guitar, he dismissed its usefulness, saying he had to start over when he got his first six-string several years later.

== Career ==
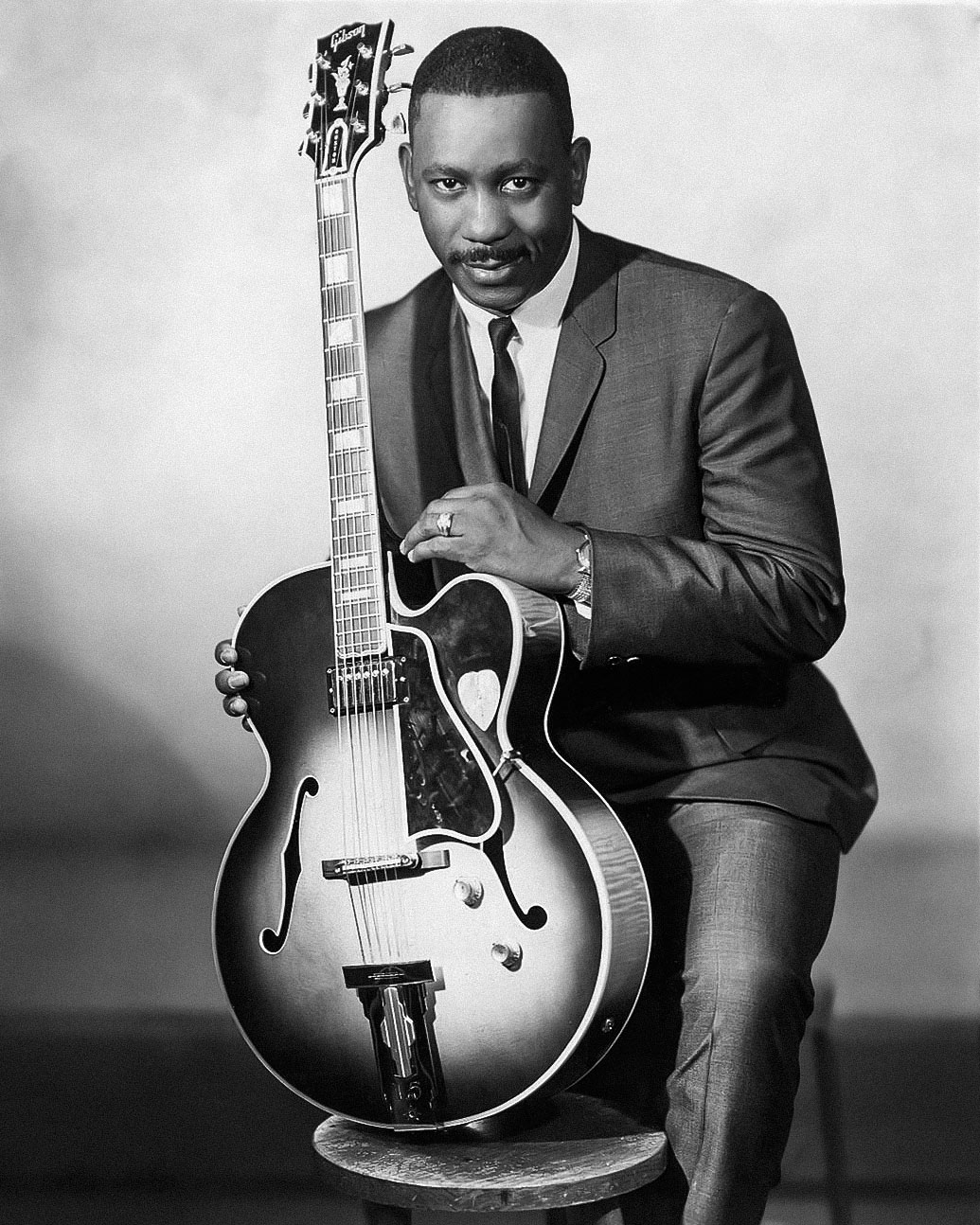
Montgomery in a mid-1960s publicity photo shot by Bruno of Hollywood studios for Verve Records

He and his brothers returned to Indianapolis. By 1943, Montgomery was working as a welder and had gotten married. While at a dance with his wife, he heard a Charlie Christian record for the first time. This experience inspired him to pick up the guitar at the age of 19, and he spent the next year teaching himself to play by imitating Christian's recordings. Although he had not planned on becoming a professional musician, he felt obligated to learn after purchasing the guitar. It is often stated that Montgomery did not receive any formal instruction and could not read music. However, in an early interview, he acknowledged that this designation as "self-taught" was not entirely accurate, because he had learned a few chords from an Indianapolis guitarist named Alex Stevens. By the age of twenty, he was performing in clubs in Indianapolis at night, copying Christian's solos, while working during the day at a milk company. In 1948, when Lionel Hampton was on tour in Indianapolis, he was looking for a guitarist, and after hearing Montgomery play like Christian he hired him.

Montgomery spent two years with the Hampton band. Fear kept him from flying with the rest of the band, so he drove from city to city, town to town, while fellow musicians marveled at his stamina. When arriving at a club, the first thing he did was call home to his wife and family. He was given the opportunity to play with Charles Mingus, Milt Buckner, and Fats Navarro, but it was not the opportunity he hoped for, and he returned to Indianapolis a better player, though tired and discouraged. He resumed performing at local clubs, this time with the Eddie Higgins Trio and the Roger Jones Quintet, playing with Eddie Higgins, Walter Perkins, and Leroy Vinnegar. He joined his brothers Buddy and Monk and saxophonist Alonzo "Pookie" Johnson in the Johnson/Montgomery Quintet, somewhat in the style of George Shearing. The band auditioned for Arthur Godfrey and recorded sessions with Quincy Jones. After a residency at a club from 1955 to 1957, Montgomery and his brothers went west.

Buddy and Monk Montgomery formed The Mastersounds and signed a contract with Dick Bock at Pacific Jazz. Montgomery joined them for a recording session in 1957 that included Freddie Hubbard. Some of the songs were released by Pacific Jazz on the album The Montgomery Brothers and Five Others, while others were issued on Fingerpickin' (Pacific Jazz, 1958). The Mastersounds remained in California when Montgomery returned to Indianapolis to work in his trio with organist Melvin Rhyne.

He worked as a welder during the day to support his wife and seven children, then performed at two clubs at night until well into the morning. He was a smoker who had blackouts while trying to maintain this busy schedule. During one performance, the audience included Cannonball Adderley, George Shearing, and Lennie Tristano. Adderley was so impressed by Montgomery's guitar playing that he persuaded Orrin Keepnews to sign him to Riverside. Keepnews was also persuaded by a gushing review written by Gunther Schuller. In New York City Montgomery recorded A Dynamic New Sound, the Wes Montgomery Trio, his first album as a leader after twenty years as a musician. In 1960, he recorded The Incredible Jazz Guitar of Wes Montgomery with Tommy Flanagan, Percy Heath, and Albert Heath.

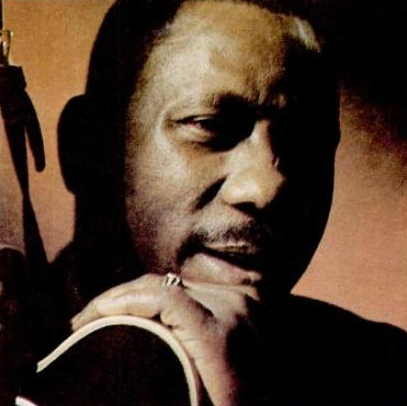
Montgomery in 1965

He joined his brothers in California to perform as the Montgomery Brothers for the Monterey Jazz Festival. The Mastersounds had broken up, and Buddy and Monk had signed with Fantasy and recorded (with Wes) The Montgomery Brothers, followed by Groove Yard. Montgomery recorded another album as a leader, So Much Guitar, then while visiting his brothers had a chance to perform with John Coltrane's group in San Francisco. In 1961, work was getting harder to find. A tour in Canada led to the album The Montgomery Brothers in Canada, then the band broke up. Montgomery returned to Indianapolis to work in his trio with Rhyne. Keepnews sent him back to California to record a live album with Johnny Griffin, Wynton Kelly, Paul Chambers, and Jimmy Cobb. Their performance became the album Full House. This was followed by Fusion! (1963), his first instrumental pop album.

After two more organ trio jazz sessions for Riverside Records in 1963 (Boss Guitar and Portrait of Wes), Montgomery left the label for Verve Records. At Verve, Montgomery began working with producer Creed Taylor, who produced Montgomery for the rest of the guitarist's life. His first Verve release, Movin' Wes (1964), was an instrumental pop album arranged by Johnny Pate. It quickly sold more than 100,000 copies and repositioned Montgomery within the recording industry as a crossover artist capable of significant LP sales. At Verve, Montgomery released his last two small-group jazz albums (a 1965 collaboration with Wynton Kelly, and a 1966 collaboration with organist Jimmy Smith), but his main focus was recording contemporary pop hits as instrumentals. Montgomery had notable success with his versions of "California Dreamin'", "Tequila", and "Goin' Out of My Head". After moving to A&M, Montgomery had his biggest radio hit, a version of "Windy", a pop song originally recorded by The Association. Of the ten Wes Montgomery albums that Taylor produced while Montgomery was alive (all recorded for Verve and A&M Records), eight were aimed at the pop market. The success of these albums led to invitations for Montgomery to perform on major U.S. television shows including The Hollywood Palace and The Tonight Show Starring Johnny Carson.

== Death and family ==
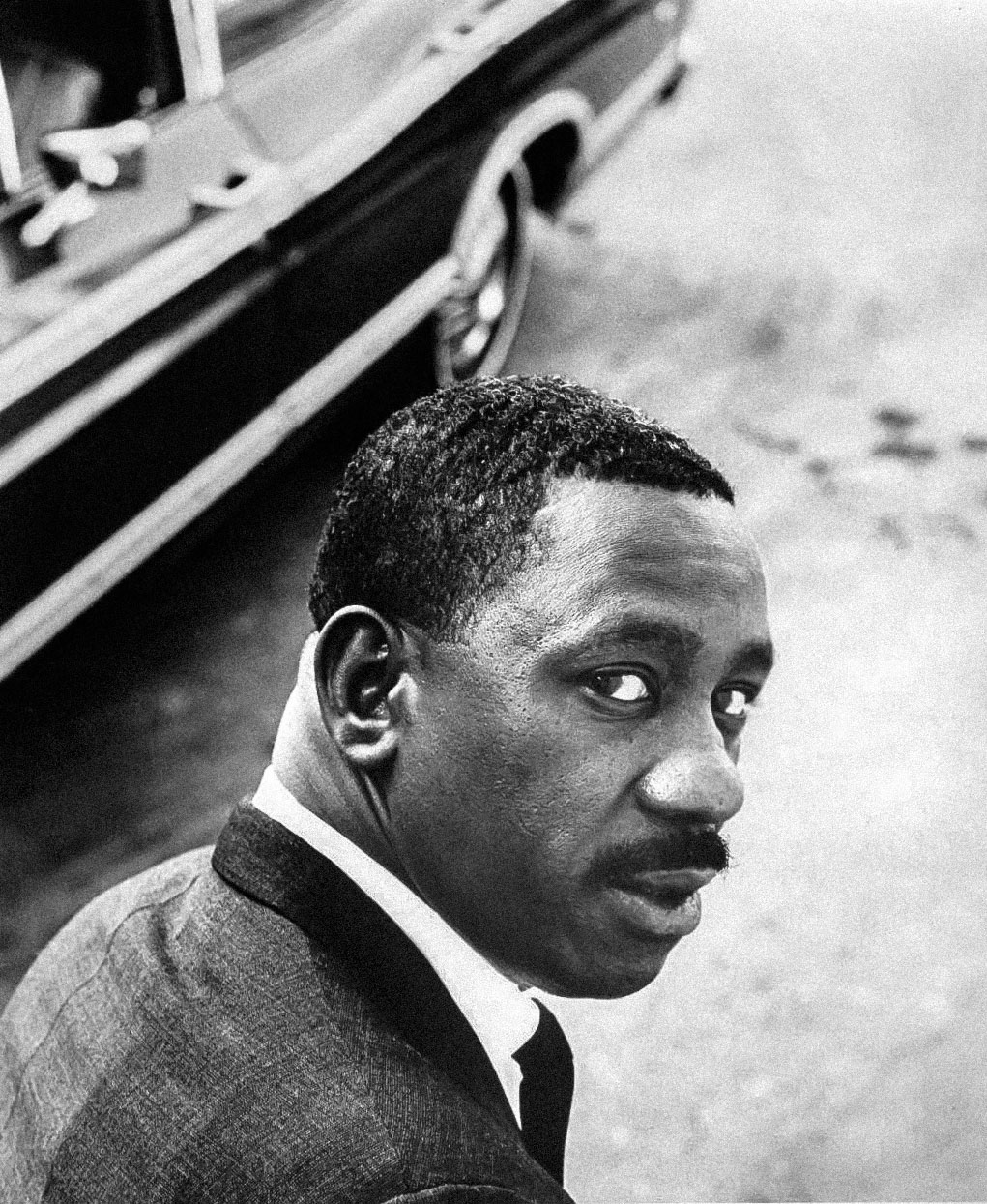
Montgomery in 1967

Montgomery died of a heart attack on June 15, 1968, while at home in Indianapolis. He was 45 years old. Obituaries were published in both The New York Times and Time Magazine, which noted that Montgomery had been "long acclaimed as one of the country’s best jazz guitarists." His funeral was held at Puritan Missionary Baptist Church of Indianapolis on June 18, 1968, with nearly 2,400 people in attendance.

He was married to Serene Montgomery (née Miles) in February 1943; the two remained together until his death in 1968, raising their seven children in Indianapolis. Serene was interviewed by journalist Kevin Finch in 2019 for the PBS documentary film Wes Bound: The Genius of Wes Montgomery (released in 2024), where she recalled that “We were first, and then the guitar was next.” Wes named one of his compositions, “Serene,” after his wife.

His grandson is American actor Anthony Montgomery, known for his roles as Travis Mayweather on Star Trek: Enterprise and Andre Maddox on the ABC daytime soap opera General Hospital.

== Artistry ==
According to jazz guitar educator Wolf Marshall, Montgomery often approached solos in a three-tiered manner: he would begin the progression with single note lines, derived from scales or modes; after a fitting number of sequences, he would play octaves for a few more sequences, finally culminating with block chords. He used mostly superimposed triads and arpeggios as the main source for his soloing ideas and sounds.

Instead of using a guitar pick, Montgomery plucked the strings with the fleshy part of his thumb, using down strokes for single notes and a combination of up strokes and down strokes for chords and octaves. He developed this technique not for technical reasons but for the benefit of his neighbors and not waking his children. He worked long hours as a machinist before his music career began and practiced late at night. To keep everyone happy, he played quietly by using his thumb. This actually worked out well, as he used an amplifier when performing, which allowed him to really exploit his thumb-picking style. Building initially on the single-line tradition of Charlie Christian, his style would significantly advance the guitar solo into bebop after he heard John Coltrane and began adding his notably graceful, warm, and intricate embellishments. His technique has been studied by many jazz guitarists and is available for students in transcription.

Montgomery was also known for his use of octaves in his playing. In an interview with music critic Ralph J. Gleason, Montgomery was quoted saying: "Playing octaves was just a coincidence. And it's still such a challenge. I used to have headaches every time I played octaves, because it was extra strain, but the minute I'd quit I'd be alright. I don't know why, but it was my way, and my way just backfired on me. But now I don't have headaches when I play octaves. I'm just showing you how a strain can capture a cat and almost choke him, but after a while it starts to ease up because you get used to it."

== Awards and honors ==
- Second Place, Readers' Poll, Metronome, 1960
- Most Promising Jazz Instrumentalist, Billboard, 1960
- Talent Deserving Wider Recognition, DownBeat, 1960
- Readers' Poll and Critics' Poll, DownBeat, 1961
- Readers' Poll and Critics' Poll, DownBeat, 1962
- Best jazz guitarist, DownBeat magazine Critics' Poll, 1960–63, 1966, 1967
- Grammy Award nominations, (two), Bumpin', 1965
- Grammy Award, Best Instrumental Jazz Performance by Large Group or Soloist with Large Group, Goin' Out of My Head, 1966
- Jazz Man of the Year, Record World, 1967
- Grammy Award nomination, "Eleanor Rigby" and "Down Here on the Ground", 1968
- Grammy Award nomination, Willow Weep for Me, 1969

== Legacy ==
Montgomery released more than 20 albums in less than 10 years as a frontman or co-headliner. After his death, additional original recordings were also discovered in archives and are today considered "treasures" by fans. He is credited as the writer of over 60 original compositions which have come to be regarded by many as "standards." Jazz guitarist Bobby Broom said that on A Dynamic New Sound in 1959, Montgomery "introduced a brand new approach to playing the guitar... The octave technique... and his chord melody and chord soloing playing still is today unmatched". Broom modeled his guitar-organ trio after Montgomery's.

== Tributes ==
Stevie Wonder wrote two tributes to Montgomery: "Bye Bye World", which appeared on his 1968 album Eivets Rednow, and "We All Remember Wes", which George Benson recorded for his 1978 live album Weekend in L.A. In 1982, Bob James and Earl Klugh collaborated on a duet album and recorded the song "Wes" as a tribute to Montgomery on the album Two of a Kind. Guitarist Emily Remler released a tribute album to Montgomery in 1988, titled East to Wes. Pat Martino released Remember: A Tribute to Wes Montgomery in 2006. Eric Johnson paid tribute to Montgomery on his 1990 album Ah Via Musicom in a song titled "East Wes". Guitarist David Becker paid tribute to Montgomery on the 1991 album In Motion with the song "Westward Ho". Lee Ritenour recorded a tribute album in 1993, Wes Bound, that contained Montgomery covers and some originals by Ritenour. While the production and arrangements are typical for the time, he performed the entire album in Montgomery's style on a Gibson L-5 model. Guitarist Joe Diorio released a tribute album in 1998, I Remember You: A Tribute to Wes Montgomery.

== Discography ==
=== As leader ===
- 1959: The Wes Montgomery Trio (Riverside, 1959)
- 1960: The Incredible Jazz Guitar of Wes Montgomery (Riverside, 1960)
- 1960: Movin' Along (Riverside, 1960)
- 1961: So Much Guitar (Riverside, 1961)
- 1961: Bags Meets Wes! with Milt Jackson (Riverside, 1962)
- 1962: Full House (Riverside, 1962)
- 1959-1963: Guitar on the Go (Riverside, 1963)
- 1963: Boss Guitar (Riverside, 1963)
- 1963: Fusion! Wes Montgomery with Strings (Riverside, 1963)
- 1963: Portrait of Wes (Riverside, 1966)
- 1964: Movin' Wes (Verve, 1964)
- 1965: Bumpin' (Verve, 1965)
- 1965: Willow Weep for Me (Verve, 1969)
- 1965: Smokin' at the Half Note with Wynton Kelly (Verve, 1965)
- 1966: Goin' Out of My Head (Verve, 1965)
- 1966: California Dreaming (Verve, 1966)
- 1966: Tequila (Verve, 1966)
- 1966: Jimmy & Wes: The Dynamic Duo with Jimmy Smith (Verve, 1966)
- 1966: Further Adventures of Jimmy and Wes with Jimmy Smith (Verve, 1969)
- 1967: A Day in the Life (A&M, 1967)
- 1967-1968: Down Here on the Ground (A&M, 1968)
- 1968: Road Song (A&M, 1968)

Collaboration with Buddy Montgomery and Monk Montgomery

- The Montgomery Brothers and Five Others (Pacific Jazz, 1958)
- The Mastersounds, Kismet (World Pacific, 1958)
- Montgomeryland (Pacific Jazz, 1960)
- The Montgomery Brothers (Fantasy, 1960)
- George Shearing and the Montgomery Brothers (Jazzland, 1961)
- The Montgomery Brothers in Canada (Fantasy, 1961)
- Groove Yard (Riverside, 1961)

Posthumous releases

- The Alternative Wes Montgomery (Milestone, 1982)
- Far Wes (Capitol, 1990) – compilation
- Fingerpickin' (Capitol, 1996) – compilation
- Echoes of Indiana Avenue (Resonance, 2012)
- Live at the Turf Club 1956 with the Montgomery–Johnson Quintet (Resonance, 2014) [RSD 10" LP, Limited Edition]
- In the Beginning (Resonance, 2015)
- One Night in Indy (Resonance, 2016)
- Smokin' in Seattle: Live at the Penthouse (Resonance, 2017)
- In Paris: The Definitive ORTF Recording (Resonance, 2018)
- Back on Indiana Avenue (The Carroll DeCamp Recordings) (Resonance, 2019)
- Maximum Swing: The Unissued 1965 Half Note Recordings (Resonance, 2023)

=== As sideman ===
- Jon Hendricks, A Good Git-Together (Pacific Jazz, 1959)
- Cannonball Adderley, Cannonball Adderley and the Poll-Winners (Riverside, 1960)
- Nat Adderley, Work Song (Riverside, 1960)
- Harold Land, West Coast Blues! (Jazzland, 1960)
