= Original Jazz Classics =

American record label

- Parent company: Concord Music Group
- Founded: 1983
- Distributor(s): Concord Music Group
- Genre: Jazz
- Country of origin: U.S.
- Official website: OJC at Concord

Original Jazz Classics (or OJC) is a record label that was founded in 1983 as an imprint of Fantasy Records.

Under this name original editions of jazz LPs have been reissued on CD and LP, and formerly on cassette as well. The recordings in the series were originally released on Riverside, Prestige, Contemporary, and other labels that were later purchased or absorbed by Fantasy. A limited edition series was begun in the late 1980s. In 2010, Concord Music Group began the series Original Jazz Classics Remasters to release remastered versions of albums with new liner notes and previously unreleased songs. In 2023, Craft Recordings attained rights to the Original Jazz Classics name and has announced plans to reissue popular titles from the label.

Original Blues Classics, a sister series, is organised on similar principles and dedicated to albums by blues performers.

== See also ==
- List of record labels
