= Sahib Shihab =

American jazz saxophonist and flautist (1925–1989)

Background information
- Born: Edmund Gregory; June 23, 1925; Savannah, Georgia, U.S.
- Died: October 24, 1989 (aged 64) Nashville, Tennessee, U.S.
- Genre: Jazz
- Occupations: Musician, saxophonist, flutist
- Instruments: Baritone, soprano and alto saxophone, Flute and alto flute
- Years active: 1940s–1980s

Sahib Shihab (born Edmund Gregory; June 23, 1925 – October 24, 1989) was an American jazz and hard bop saxophonist (baritone, alto, and soprano) and flautist. He variously worked with Luther Henderson, Thelonious Monk, Fletcher Henderson, Tadd Dameron, Dizzy Gillespie, Kenny Clarke, John Coltrane and Quincy Jones among others.

== Biography ==
He was born in Savannah, Georgia, United States. Schooling in New York from age 3. Sahib Shihab first played alto saxophone professionally for Luther Henderson aged 13, and studied at the Boston Conservatory, and played in and around New York with Art Blakey, Gigi Gryce/Benny Golson, Thelonious Monk, Oscar Pettiford, Dizzy Gillespie. Toured with the bands of Fletcher Henderson, Buddy Johnson, Roy Eldridge, Andy Kirk, Duke Ellington, Count Basie and the original 17 Messengers of Blakey.

He was one of the first jazz musicians to convert to Islam and changed his name in 1947. He belonged to the Ahmadiyya movement of Islam. During the late 1940s, Shihab played with Thelonious Monk, and on July 23, 1951 he recorded with Monk (later issued on the album Genius of Modern Music: Volume 2). During this period, he also appeared on recordings by Art Blakey, Kenny Dorham and Benny Golson. The invitation to play with Dizzy Gillespie's big band in the early 1950s was of particular significance, as it marked Shihab's switch to baritone.

In 1952 - 1955 he toured with Illinois Jacquet in Europe, as well as with Coleman Hawkins and Sarah Vaughn. He also toured with Dakota Stanton from 1956 - 1958.

On August 12, 1958, Shihab was one of the musicians photographed by Art Kane in his photograph known as "A Great Day in Harlem". In 1959, he toured Europe with Quincy Jones. Shihab, disillusioned with racial politics in United States, decided around this time to move to Europe. in 1960 he settled in Scandinavia, first in Stockholm, Sweden, then moving in 1964 to Copenhagen, Denmark. He worked for Copenhagen Polytechnic and wrote scores for television, cinema and theatre, in addition to composing and arranging for Swedish and Danish radio orchestras, and he wrote a ballet based on the Danish writer Hans Christian Andersen's fairy tale, The Red Shoes.

In Denmark, Shihab performed with local musicians such as the bass player Niels-Henning Ørsted Pedersen amongst others. Together with pianist Kenny Drew, he ran a publishing firm and record company.

In 1961, he joined the Kenny Clarke/Francy Boland Big Band and remained a member of the band for the 12 years it existed. He married a Danish woman and raised a family in Europe.

In the Eurovision Song Contest 1966, Shihab accompanied Lill Lindfors and Svante Thuresson on stage for the Swedish entry "Nygammal Vals".

In 1973, Shihab returned to the United States, where he toured with Quincy Jones and The Brothers Johnson in the States and Japan. He returned to Copenhagen in 1976, where he produced albums for Metronome Records, along with Kenny Drew entitled Brief Encounter, featuring the voices of Debby Cameron and Richard Boone. In 1979 he started a record company in partnership with Kenny Drew, called MATRIX. Some releases include: Prize Winners - Svend Asmussen Quartet, Funk Dumplin's - Clark Terry Quartet, Rain - Thomas Clausen Quartet, and Ernie Wilkins & the Almost Big Band by the Almost Big Band.

He spent his remaining years between New York and Copenhagen, and played in a partnership with Art Farmer. He also led his own jazz combo called Dues. From 1986, Shihab was a visiting artist at Rutgers University, where future composer Kenneth Lampl was one of his students.

Shihab died from cancer on October 24, 1989, in Nashville, Tennessee, United States, aged 64.

== Discography ==
=== As leader ===
- 1957: The Jazz We Heard Last Summer (Savoy) split album shared with Herbie Mann
- 1957: Jazz Sahib (Savoy)
- 1963: Sahib's Jazz Party (Debut) also released as Conversations
- 1964: Summer Dawn (Argo)
- 1965: Sahib Shihab and the Danish Radio Jazz Group (Oktav)
- 1968: Seeds (Vogue Schallplatten)
- 1964-70: Companionship (Vogue Schallplatten)
- 1972: Sentiments (Storyville)
- 1972: La Marche dans le Désert - Sahib Shihab + Gilson Unit (Futura)
- 1973: Flute Summit (Atlantic) with Jeremy Steig, James Moody and Chris Hinze
- 1988: Soul Mates (Uptown) with Charlie Rouse
- 1998: And All Those Cats (compilation)

=== As sideman ===
With Art Blakey

- Theory of Art (1957)
- Art Blakey Big Band (Bethlehem, 1957)

With Brass Fever

- Time Is Running Out (Impulse!, 1976)

With Donald Byrd

- Jazz Lab (Columbia, 1957) with Gigi Gryce
- Modern Jazz Perspective (Columbia, 1957) with Gigi Gryce

With Betty Carter

- Out There (1958)
- I Can't Help It (1992)

With the Kenny Clarke/Francy Boland Big Band

- Jazz Is Universal (Atlantic, 1962)
- Handle with Care (Atlantic, 1963)
- Now Hear Our Meanin' (Columbia, 1963 [1965])
- Swing, Waltz, Swing (Philips, 1966)
- Sax No End (SABA, 1967)
- Out of the Folk Bag (Columbia, 1967)
- 17 Men and Their Music (Campi, 1967)
- All Smiles (MPS, 1968)
- Faces (MPS, 1969)
- Latin Kaleidoscope (MPS, 1968)
- Fellini 712 (MPS, 1969)
- All Blues (MPS, 1969)
- More Smiles (MPS, 1969)
- Clarke Boland Big Band en Concert avec Europe 1 (Tréma, 1969 [1992])
- Off Limits (Polydor, 1970)
- November Girl (Black Lion, 1970 [1975]) with Carmen McRae
- Change of Scenes (Verve, 1971) with Stan Getz

With John Coltrane

- Coltrane (1957)

With Tadd Dameron

- Fontainebleau (1956)

With Art Farmer

- Manhattan (Soul Note, 1981)

With Curtis Fuller and Hampton Hawes

- Curtis Fuller and Hampton Hawes with French Horns (Status, 1957 [1962]) - also released as Baritones and French Horns (Prestige, 1957)

With Dizzy Gillespie

- Jazz Recital (Norgran, 1955)
- The Dizzy Gillespie Reunion Big Band (MPS, 1968)

With Benny Golson

- Benny Golson's New York Scene (Contemporary, 1957)
- Take a Number from 1 to 10 (Argo, 1961)

With Johnny Griffin

- Lady Heavy Bottom's Waltz (1968)
- Griff 'N Bags

With George Gruntz

- Noon in Tunisia (1967)

With Roy Haynes

- Jazz Abroad (Emarcy, 1955)

With Milt Jackson

- Plenty, Plenty Soul (Atlantic, 1957)

With Philly Joe Jones

- Drums Around the World (Riverside, 1959)

With Quincy Jones

- The Birth of a Band! (Mercury, 1959)
- The Great Wide World of Quincy Jones (Mercury, 1959)
- I Dig Dancers (Mercury, 1960)
- Quincy Plays for Pussycats (Mercury, 1959–65 [1965])

With Abbey Lincoln

- It's Magic (Riverside, 1958)

With Howard McGhee

- The Return of Howard McGhee (Bethlehem, 1955)

With Thelonious Monk

- Genius of Modern Music: Volume 1 (Blue Note, 1947)
- Genius of Modern Music: Volume 2 (Blue Note, 1951)

With Mark Murphy

- Midnight Mood (MPS, 1968)

With Phineas Newborn, Jr.

- Phineas Newborn, Jr. Plays Harold Arlen's Music from Jamaica (RCA Victor, 1957)

With Oscar Pettiford

- The Oscar Pettiford Orchestra in Hi-Fi Volume Two (ABC-Paramount, 1957)

With Specs Powell

- Movin' In (Roulette, 1957)

With A. K. Salim

- Blues Suite (Savoy, 1958)

With Tony Scott

- The Modern Art of Jazz (1957, Seeco) - with Bill Evans, Paul Motian
- Free Blown Jazz (1957, Carlton) - with Bill Evans, Paul Motian

With Mal Waldron

- Mal-2 (1957)

With Julius Watkins and Charlie Rouse

- The Jazz Modes (Atlantic, 1959)

With Randy Weston

- Uhuru Afrika (Roulette, 1960)

With Gene Quill, Hal Stein and Phil Woods

- Four Altos (Prestige, 1957)]

With Phil Woods

- Rights of Swing (Candid, 1961)

With Idrees Sulieman

- The Camel (Columbia, 1964)
