= S. Neil Fujita =

American graphic designer (1921–2010)

Sadamitsu Neil Fujita
- Fujita in the 1960s
- Born: Sadamitsu Fujita; May 16, 1921; Waimea, Territory of Hawaii, U.S.
- Died: October 23, 2010 (aged 89); Greenport, New York, U.S.
- Education: Chouinard Art Institute
- Occupation: Graphic artist
- Years active: 1949–1990s
- Known for: Album and book covers
- Spouse: Aiko Tamaki
- Children: 3

Sadamitsu Neil Fujita /fuˈdʒitə/ (Japanese: 藤田 定光, May 16, 1921 – October 23, 2010) was an American graphic designer known for his innovative book cover and record album designs.

== Early life ==
Born in Waimea, Hawaii, to Japanese immigrants, Fujita attended a boarding school in Honolulu, where he adopted the name Neil. He enrolled in Chouinard Art Institute, but his studies were interrupted by World War II and his forced relocation in 1942 (following the signing of Executive Order 9066), first to the Pomona Assembly Center outside Los Angeles and later to the Heart Mountain Relocation Center in Wyoming. During his confinement, he worked as the art director of the camp newspaper, the Heart Mountain Sentinel.

He enlisted in the United States Army on January 1, 1943, and served in an anti-tank unit with the 442nd Infantry Regiment, a segregated regiment of Japanese American volunteers and draftees that became the most decorated unit in the war. He was assigned to combat duty in Europe, seeing action in Italy and France, but eventually worked as a translator in the Pacific theater in Okinawa. Fujita achieved the rank of Master Sergeant. He completed his studies at Chouinard after the war on the G.I. Bill.

== Career ==
A 1957 gouache by Fujita adapted for the album cover of Modern Jazz Perspective.

Fujita joined a prominent Philadelphia ad agency—N.W. Ayer & Son—after completing his studies. He worked for Ayer for three years and during his tenure was awarded an Art Directors Club gold medal for his Container Company of America ad. He employed an avant-garde style and was noticed by William Golden at Columbia Records. Columbia hired him in 1954 to lead the design department, building on the work of Alex Steinweiss who established the practice of custom cover art. Fujita was the first to commission painters, photographers and illustrators to create cover art for Columbia's albums. Columbia felt a particular need to keep up with the cover art of Blue Note Records. While at Columbia, Fujita designed close to 50 album covers, including numerous iconic jazz covers from the period for Dave Brubeck, Miles Davis, the Jazz Messengers, and Charles Mingus, among others. Fujita used his own colorful abstract paintings for the covers of Brubeck's Time Out, Gigi Gryce’s Modern Jazz Perspective, and Mingus Ah Um. His painting adapted for Modern Jazz Perspective is gouache on paper, and features “a busy plane of geometric shapes, mustardy colors, and evocative yet elusive details.”

In 1957, Fujita left Columbia in order to broaden his portfolio. He rejoined the company a year later but left for good in 1960 to start his own firm. In 1963, he joined the public relations firm Ruder & Finn, creating a design division called Ruder, Finn & Fujita (later Fujita Design) where he embarked on a long career of book cover design. He designed the covers for In Cold Blood, The Godfather, and Pigeon Feathers. He taught design at the Philadelphia Museum College of Art, the Pratt Institute, and Parsons School of Design. Near the time of retirement in the late 1980s, he served on the Board of Designers of the Go for Broke Monument near the Japanese American National Museum in Los Angeles.

== Death ==
A resident of Southold, New York, Fujita died at age 89 due to complications of a stroke on October 23, 2010, in Greenport, New York. He was survived by a younger brother, Hisao "Hy" Fujita, (also a graphic designer), three sons and six grandchildren. His wife, Aiko Tamaki, whom he met while she was also a student at Chouinard, died in 2006.

== Bibliography ==
- Aim for a job in graphic design/art (1968)
