= Monk Montgomery in Africa...Live! =

Live album by Monk Montgomery
- Released: 1975
- Recorded: November 9, 1974
- Venue: Orlando Stadium, Soweto
- Genre: Jazz
- Label: Philadelphia International
- Producer: Hilton Rosenthal, Peter Thwaites

Monk Montgomery chronology
Reality (1974)	Monk Montgomery in Africa...Live! (1975)

Monk Montgomery in Africa...Live! is the fourth and final solo album of American bassist Monk Montgomery. It was recorded at the Orlando Stadium, Soweto, South Africa, on November 9, 1974, and released in 1975 on Philadelphia International Records.

== Background ==
In 1970 Montgomery recorded in Los Angeles with South African trumpeter Hugh Masekela, on Masekela’s album Reconstruction. In 1974 Monk toured South Africa with a group including singer Lovelace Watkins, and at the end of the tour he recorded this live album in Soweto.

== Track listing ==
1. "Jumpin' at the Woodside" (Count Basie) (11:18)
2. "Stella by Starlight" (Victor Young) (6:00)
3. "Blues for Nkwe" (Al Hall, Jr.) (11:12)
4. "Testing One, Two" (Rudolph Johnson) (5:48)

== Personnel ==
- Monk Montgomery - bass
- Marshall Royal - band leader, alto saxophone
- Rudolph Johnson - tenor saxophone, flute
- Danny Cortez - trumpet
- Al Hall, Jr. - trombone
- Delbert Hill - clarinet
- Charles Mallory - guitar
- Kirk Lightsey - keyboards
- Curtis Kirk - drums

== Technical personnel ==
- Hilton Rosenthal, Peter Thwaites - producers
- Peter Thwaites - engineer (Gallo Studios)
- Peter Ceronio - assistant engineer (Gallo Studios)
- Rufus - cover design
- Ronnie Kwei - photographs
- Mobile recording unit supplied by Northwest Music
