= The Art Farmer Septet =

Studio album by Art Farmer
- Released: 1956
- Recorded: July 2, 1953 and June 7, 1954
- Studios: WOR Studios, New York City and Van Gelder Studio, Hackensack, New Jersey
- Genre: Jazz
- Length: 33:00
- Label: Prestige
- Producers: Bob Weinstock and Ira Gitler

Art Farmer chronology
The Art Farmer Septet (1956)	Early Art (1954)

10-inch album
- 1954 10-inch album, Work of Art

Singles from Art Farmer
- 1. "Mau Mau (Pt.1 & 2)" Released: 1953; 2. "Wildwood/Tia Juana" Released: 1954; 3. "Evening in Paris/Elephant Walk" Released: 1954

The Art Farmer Septet is an album by trumpeter Art Farmer, featuring performances recorded in 1953 and 1954, arranged by Quincy Jones and Gigi Gryce, and released by Prestige Records in 1956. It is his earliest recorded full-length album, but was his third issued. The cover art was by cartoonist Don Martin.

The recordings made on July 2, 1953, feature Monk Montgomery on bass guitar, and are possibly the earliest studio recordings with that instrument, according to musician Chuck Rainey. Arranger Quincy Jones highlights Montgomery in the opening sections of three of the four tracks, and Montgomery shows his technical skill on a variety of styles and techniques.

All of the players on the 1953 recording were at that time members of the Lionel Hampton Orchestra, and subsequently toured Europe with Hampton from September to December 1953, except Sonny Johnson. Johnson was a previous associate of bass player Monk Montgomery, from Indiana.

The four tracks recorded in 1953 were first issued in 1954 on a 10-inch album Work of Art, on Prestige Records. Three singles were released, the first being “Mau Mau (Pt. 1 & 2)” (Prestige 875) in 1953.

== Reception ==
Professional ratings
Review scores
Source	Rating
AllMusic	4/5 stars
The Penguin Guide to Jazz Recordings	3/4 stars

AllMusic called the album "An excellent early hard bop set". The Penguin Guide to Jazz commented that the album demonstrates that Farmer's "style was already firmly in place: a pensive restraint on ballads, a fleet yet soberly controlled attack on uptempo tunes, and a concern for tonal manipulation within a small range of inflexions".

== Track listing ==
All compositions by Art Farmer and Quincy Jones except where noted.

1. "Mau Mau" – 5:15
2. "Work of Art" – 5:46
3. "The Little Bandmaster" – 4:06
4. "Up in Quincy's Room" (Gigi Gryce) – 4:00
5. "Wildwood" (Gryce) – 2:55
6. "Evening in Paris" (Quincy Jones) – 2:41
7. "Elephant Walk" (Jones) – 3:25
8. "Tia Juana" (Gryce) – 4:52

Note

- Recorded in WOR Studios, New York City on July 2, 1953 (tracks 1–4) and at Van Gelder Studio in Hackensack, New Jersey on June 7, 1954 (tracks 5–8)

== Personnel ==
- Art Farmer – trumpet
- Jimmy Cleveland – trombone
- Clifford Solomon (tracks 1–4), Charlie Rouse (tracks 5–8) – tenor saxophone
- Oscar Estell (tracks 1–4), Danny Bank (tracks 5–8) – baritone saxophone
- Quincy Jones (tracks 1–4), Horace Silver (tracks 5–8) – piano
- Monk Montgomery – electric bass (tracks 1–4)
- Percy Heath – bass (tracks 5–8)
- Sonny Johnson (tracks 1–4), Art Taylor (tracks 5–8) – drums
- Quincy Jones – percussion (track 1)
- Quincy Jones (tracks 1–4), Gigi Gryce (tracks 5–8) – arrangement

=== Production ===
- Doug Hawkins – recording engineer (tracks 1–4)
- Ira Gitler – producer (tracks 1–4)
- Rudy Van Gelder – recording engineer (tracks 5–8)
- Bob Weinstock – producer (tracks 5–8)
