= Doin' the Gigi =

Compilation album by Gigi Gryce
- Released: 2011
- Recorded: June 24, 1957 to August 19, 1961
- Genre: Jazz
- Length: 69:56
- Label: Uptown; UPCD 27.64
- Producer: Robert E. Sunenblick

Gigi Gryce chronology
Reminiscin' (1960)	Doin' the Gigi (2011)

Doin' the Gigi is an album by American saxophonist Gigi Gryce compiling live and studio recordings from 1957 to 1961 which was released on the Uptown label in 2011.

== Reception ==
Professional ratings
Review scores
Source	Rating
AllMusic	4.5/5 stars

AllMusic awarded the album 4½ stars stating: "Gigi Gryce had a short but productive career, which lasted roughly a decade before he abruptly left jazz in the early 1960s to become a teacher. This compilation of unissued performances is an important addition to his legacy, particularly the 1961 Birdland broadcast, which features the working band he used for his Rat Race Blues album ".

== Track listing ==
All compositions by Gigi Gryce except as indicated

1. "Blues in Bloom" (Norman Mapp) - 11:24
2. "A Premonition of You" - 4:40
3. "A Night in Tunisia" (Dizzy Gillespie, Frank Paparelli) - 7:37
4. "Down Home" - 5:35
5. "Blues in Bloom" (Mapp) - 3:02
6. "Dancing the Gigi" - 2:31
7. "Sonor" (Gerald Wiggins, Kenny Clarke) - 3:32
8. "Down Home" - 4:16
9. "Take the "A" Train" (Billy Strayhorn) - 4:00
10. "Stompin' at the Savoy" (Edgar Sampson) - 2:37
11. "I'll Walk Alone" (Sammy Cahn, Jule Styne) - 4:32
12. "Caravan" (Duke Ellington, Juan Tizol, Irving Mills) - 4:58
13. "All the Things You Are" (Oscar Hammerstein II, Jerome Kern) - 1:46
14. Announcements by Al "Jazzbo" Collins & Hugh Downs - 0:28
15. "Leila's Blues" - 1:32
16. "There Will Never Be Another You" (Harry Warren, Mack Gordon) - 2:35
17. "Man of Moods" (Duke Jordan, Cecil Payne) - 2:46
18. "The Blues Walk" (Clifford Brown, Chris Woods, Sonny Stitt) - 2:05
- Recorded in New York City on June 24, 1957, at the Golden Thread Café, Hotel New Yorker (tracks 13–18), early 1960 at Nola Penthouse Studios (tracks 7–12), 1961 at A & R Studios (tracks 5 & 6), and August 19, 1961, at Birdland (tracks 1–4)

== Personnel ==
- Gigi Gryce - alto saxophone
- Cecil Payne - baritone saxophone (tracks 13–18)
- Richard Williams (tracks 1–12) - trumpet
- Eddie Costa - vibraphone (tracks 1–6)
- Richard Wyands (tracks 1–12), Duke Jordan (tracks 13–18) - piano
- Julian Euell (tracks 1–6), unknown (tracks 7–12), Wendell Marshall (tracks 13–18) - bass
- Mickey Roker (tracks 1–6), unknown (tracks 7–12), Art Taylor (tracks 13–18) - drums
