= Art Farmer Quintet featuring Gigi Gryce =

Studio album by Art Farmer
- Released: 1956
- Recorded: October 21, 1955
- Studio: Van Gelder Studio, Hackensack, New Jersey
- Genre: Jazz
- Length: 34:30
- Label: Prestige; P 7017
- Producer: Bob Weinstock

Art Farmer chronology
When Farmer Met Gryce (1955)	Art Farmer Quintet featuring Gigi Gryce (1956)	2 Trumpets (1956)

Gigi Gryce chronology
When Farmer Met Gryce (1954–55)	Art Farmer Quintet featuring Gigi Gryce (1955)	Nica's Tempo (1955)

Art Farmer Quintet featuring Gigi Gryce (also released as Evening in Casablanca) is an album by trumpeter Art Farmer's Quintet featuring saxophonist Gigi Gryce. It was recorded in 1955 and released on the Prestige label.

== Reception ==
Professional ratings
Review scores
Source	Rating
Allmusic	4.5/5 stars
The Penguin Guide to Jazz Recordings	4/4 stars

In his review for Allmusic, Stephen Cook calls the album "a set that qualifies as one of Farmer's best. A must for every jazz collection". The Penguin Guide to Jazz is similarly positive, giving it a maximum four-star rating. It comments on the strengths of Gryce's compositions, mentioning "Evening in Casablanca" and "Satellite" for their "unusual structures" and "Nica's Tempo" for being "constructed more from key centres than from chords, [it] might be his masterpiece".

== Track listing ==
All compositions by Gigi Gryce except where noted.

1. "Forecast" (Duke Jordan) — 4:48
2. "Evening in Casablanca" — 5:20
3. "Nica's Tempo" — 7:50
4. "Satellite" — 4:21
5. "Sans Souci" — 6:39
6. "Shabozz" — 5:32

== Personnel ==
- Art Farmer — trumpet
- Gigi Gryce — alto saxophone
- Duke Jordan — piano
- Addison Farmer — bass
- Philly Joe Jones — drums
