= Home Is Where the Music Is =

1972 jazz and Afrobeat double LP by Hugh Masekela

Studio album by Hugh Masekela
- Released: 1972
- Recorded: 15 January 1972
- Studio: Island Studios, London
- Genre: Jazz, Afrobeat
- Length: 76:33
- Label: Chisa/Blue Thumb BTS 6003
- Producer: Stewart Levine, Caiphus Semenya

Hugh Masekela chronology
Hugh Masekela & The Union of South Africa (1971)	Home Is Where the Music Is (1972)	Introducing Hedzoleh Soundz (1973)

Professional ratings
Review scores
Source	Rating
AllMusic	4.5/5 stars
The Encyclopedia of Popular Music	4/5 stars
Channel 24	5/5 stars
Tom Hull	A−

Home Is Where the Music Is (African Connection) is a 1972 jazz and Afrobeat double LP by Hugh Masekela issued by the joint American label Chisa/Blue Thumb Records. The album was included in the book 1001 Albums You Must Hear Before You Die.

== Critical reception ==
Thom Jurek of Allmusic stated: "Home Is Where the Music Is is a stone spiritual soul-jazz classic, that melds the sound of numerous emerging jazz schools in its pursuit of musical excellence; it succeeds on all counts and is one of the greatest recordings in Hugh Masekela's long career. In a year full of amazing titles, this is still a standout."

Miles Keylock of Channel 24 wrote: "Recorded at London's Island Studios a matter of months before his own departure to Guinea these 10 tracks (originally a double LP) find Masekela digging deep into his African jazz heritage. Gone are the patented pop jazz covers, replaced by inquisitive Afro-American conversations that range from rhythm 'n bluesy soaked soul jazz extrapolations on fellow exiled composer Caiphus Semenya's 'The Big Apple' to freewheeling Cape to Cuba township bop original groovers like 'Maseru' and the lilting ballad 'Nomali'."

== Track listing ==
No.	Title	Writer(s)	Length
1.	"Part of a Whole"	Caiphus Semenya	9:37
2.	"Minawa"	Sekou Toure	9:37
3.	"The Big Apple"	Caiphus Semenya	7:53
4.	"Unhomé"	Miriam Makeba	5:28
5.	"Maseru"	Hugh Masekela	7:07
6.	"Inner Crisis"	Larry Willis	5:52
7.	"Blues for Huey"	Kippie Moeketsi	6:25
8.	"Nomali"	Caiphus Semenya	7:21
9.	"Maesha"	Caiphus Semenya	10:28
10.	"Ingoo Pow-Pow" (Children's Song)	Caiphus Semenya	6:45
Total length:			76:33

== Personnel ==
- Hugh Masekela – flugelhorn
- Larry Willis – acoustic and electric piano
- Dudu Pukwana – alto saxophone
- Eddie Gomez – bass guitar
- Makhaya Ntshoko – drums
- Stewart Levine – producer
- Caiphus Semenya – producer
- Rik Pekkonen – engineer
