= Leon Merian =

American jazz trumpeter

Leon Merian (17 September 1923 – 15 August 2007) was an American jazz trumpeter and teacher. Dizzy Gillespie described his playing as "one of the most beautiful sounds you'll ever hear". Merian was also a French teacher and public school administrator.

== Life ==
He was born Leon Megerdichian in South Braintree, Massachusetts, on 17 September 1923, to Armenian immigrant parents.

Merian learned trumpet from Georges Mager.

He was a member of Lucky Millinder's band when it toured the segregated south; he was not welcome at either "white" or "colored" establishments, and ended up sleeping on the tour bus.

Merian moved to 20th Century Fox Records in November 1958.

He later had his own band; one member of it was Herb Phillips.

His publications included the well known Trumpet Isometrics. He published an autobiography in 2000.

Merian died on 15 August 2007, in Sarasota, Florida.

== Discography ==
=== As leader ===
- The Magic Horn (Decca)

Matrix number (Decca)	Date	Title
103161	28 August 1957	The Magic Horn
103162	28 August 1957	Love theme from La Strada
103163	28 August 1957	Harlem nocturne
103164	28 August 1957	Someone to watch over me
103181	29 August 1957	My love and I
103182	29 August 1957	The crying wind
103183	29 August 1957	Lonely wine
103184	29 August 1957	The nearness of you
103374	24 August 1957	Something sentimental
103375	24 August 1957	When you wish upon a star
103376	24 August 1957	My silent love
103377	24 August 1957	Dream along with me
105219	26 June 1958	One Day I'll Buy a Trumpet
105220	26 June 1958	Bing! Bang! Bong!

=== As sideman ===
- Specs Powell, Movin' In (Roulette, 1957)
- Tito Puente, The Essential Tito Puente (RCA, 2005)
- Pete Rugolo, Rugolomania (Columbia, 1955)

==== Lucky Millinder Orchestra ====
With the Lucky Millinder Orchestra:

Matrix number (Decca)	Date	Title
73395	26 February 1946	How big can you get
73396	26 February 1946	More, more, more
73397	26 February 1946	There's good blues tonight
73398	26 February 1946	Shorty's got to go
73399	26 February 1946	Chittlin' switch
73561	10 May 1946	Fare Thee well Deacon Jones
73861	11 April 1947	You can't put out a fire
73862	11 April 1947	The spider and the fly
73863	11 April 1947	Let it roll
73864	11 April 1947	Begging for love

==== Gladys Bruce ====
With Gladys Bruce:

Matrix number (Decca)	Date	Title
81296	20 July 1951	If, if, if you were mine
81297	20 July 1951	I've got the blues for my baby
81298	20 July 1951	Trinidad Daddy
81299	20 July 1951	The right kind of feeling

==== Alan Freed Rock 'n' Roll Band ====
Matrix number (Decca)	Date	Title
102267	15 April 1957	Swizzle Time
102268	15 April 1957	Late Hours
102269	15 April 1957	You for Me
102270	15 April 1957	Readin', Writin' and Rockin'
102279	16 April 1957	Three Bad Men
102280	16 April 1957	Gumbo Rock
102281	16 April 1957	Kissing Rock
102282	16 April 1957	Sweet Potato Pie
102283	17 April 1957	The Street
102284	17 April 1957	Mr. Onion Head
102285	17 April 1957	Ease Down
102286	17 April 1957	The King's Ring
103662	13 November 1957	Lady Whistle Bait
103663	13 November 1957	Fandango Rock
103664	13 November 1957	Cool Papa
103665	13 November 1957	Teenage Strut
103681	15 November 1957	Two Good Guys
103682	15 November 1957	Tuxedo Junction
103683	15 November 1957	In a Little Spanish Town
103684	15 November 1957	Pushing
103746	22 November 1957	Split Level
103747	22 November 1957	A Stomping Good Time
103748	22 November 1957	Two Head
103749	22 November 1957	Campus Rumpus

== Bibliography ==
- Trumpet Isometrics
- Leon Merian, The Man Behind The Horn, Leon Merian with Bill Bridges, Diem Publishing Co, Bradenton, Florida, 2000, 287 pp.
