= Hugh Masekela & The Union of South Africa =

1971 studio album by Hugh Masekela

Studio album by Hugh Masekela
- Released: May 1971
- Recorded: 5–7 April 1971
- Studio: Poppi Studios, Los Angeles, California.
- Genre: Jazz
- Label: Chisa Records 73041
- Producer: Stewart Levine

Hugh Masekela chronology
Reconstruction (1970)	Hugh Masekela & The Union of South Africa (1971)	Home Is Where the Music Is (1972)

Professional ratings
Review scores
Source	Rating
AllMusic	2.5/5 stars
The Encyclopedia of Popular Music	3/5 stars
The Rolling Stone Jazz & Blues Album Guide	3.5/5 stars

Hugh Masekela & The Union of South Africa is the thirteenth studio album by South African jazz trumpeter Hugh Masekela, released via the Chisa Records label in May 1971. The album was re-released on CD in 1994 on the MoJazz label.

== Track listing ==
No.	Title	Writer(s)	Length
1.	"Goin' Back to New Orleans"	Hugh Masekela	5:07
2.	"Ade"	Caiphus Semenya	3:47
3.	"To Get Ourselves Together"	Hugh Masekela	2:55
4.	"Johannesburg Hi-Lite Jive"	Jonas Gwangwa, Christopher Songxaka	3:57
5.	"Mamani"	Caiphus Semenya	5:20
6.	"Shebeen"	Jonas Gwangwa	4:00
7.	"Dyambo" (Weary Day Is Over)	Caiphus Semenya	3:48
8.	"Caution!"	Caiphus Semenya	5:45
9.	"Hush" (Somebody's Calling My Name)	Joe May	3:32

== Personnel ==
- Design, photography – Barry Feinstein, Tom Wilkes
- Engineer – Lewis Peters
- Engineer – Rik Pekkonen
- Producer – Stewart Levine
- Vocals, alto saxophone – Caiphus Semenya
- Vocals, trombone – Jonas Gwangwa
- Vocals, trumpet – Hugh Masekela
