= Jimmy Cleveland =

American jazz trombonist (1926–2008)

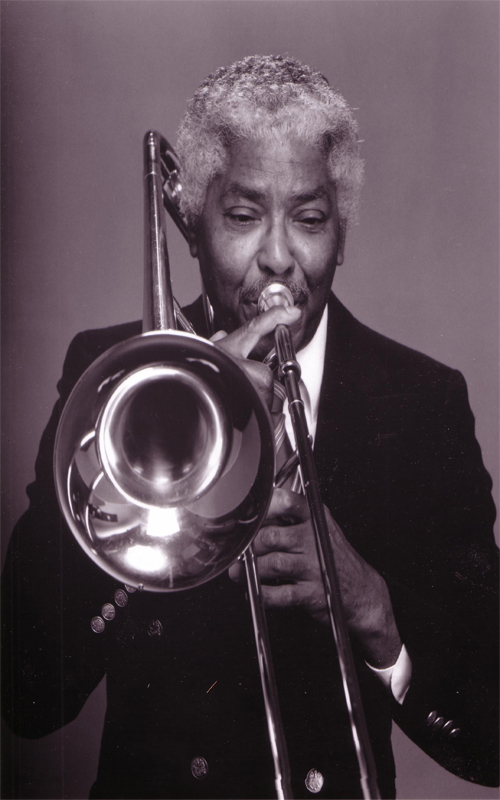

Background information
- Born: James Milton Cleveland; May 3, 1926; Wartrace, Tennessee, U.S.
- Died: August 23, 2008 (aged 82) Lynwood, California
- Genres: Jazz
- Occupation: Musician
- Instrument: Trombone
- Years active: 1951–2008
- Labels: EmArcy, Verve
- Spouse: Janet Thurlow

James Milton Cleveland (May 3, 1926 – August 23, 2008) was an American jazz trombonist born in Wartrace, Tennessee.

Cleveland was signed by EmArcy Records in 1955. Cleveland was married to jazz vocalist Janet Thurlow. He died on August 23, 2008, in Lynwood, California, at the age of 82. He was buried beside his wife at Riverside National Cemetery.

== Discography ==
=== As leader ===
- Introducing Jimmy Cleveland and His All Stars (EmArcy, 1955)
- Cleveland Style (EmArcy, 1957)
- A Map of Jimmy Cleveland (Mercury, 1958)
- Rhythm Crazy (EmArcy, 1959 [1964])

=== As sideman ===
with Julian "Cannonball" Adderley

- Julian "Cannonball" Adderley (EmArcy, 1955)

With Gene Ammons

- Free Again (Prestige, 1971)

With Dorothy Ashby

- The Fantastic Jazz Harp of Dorothy Ashby (Atlantic, 1965)

With Art Blakey

- Art Blakey Big Band (Bethlehem, 1957)

With Brass Fever

- Time Is Running Out (Impulse!, 1976)

with James Brown

- Soul on Top (King/Verve, 1970)

With Ruth Brown

- Miss Rhythm (Atlantic, 1959)

With Kenny Burrell

- Guitar Forms (Verve, 1965)
- Blues - The Common Ground (Verve, 1968)
- Night Song (Verve, 1969)

With Donald Byrd

- Jazz Lab (Columbia, 1957) - co-led with Gigi Gryce
- Modern Jazz Perspective (Columbia, 1957) - co-led with Gigi Gryce
- I'm Tryin' to Get Home (Blue Note, 1965)

with Clifford Coulter

- Do It Now! (Impulse!, 1971)

With Hank Crawford

- Mr. Blues Plays Lady Soul (Atlantic, 1969)

With Eddie "Lockjaw" Davis

- Trane Whistle (Prestige, 1960)

with Miles Davis

- Miles Ahead (Columbia, 1957)
- Porgy and Bess (Columbia, 1958)

With Teddy Edwards

- Mississippi Lad (Verve/Gitanes, 1991)

with Gil Evans

- Gil Evans & Ten (Prestige, 1957)
- The Individualism of Gil Evans (Verve, 1964)
- Blues in Orbit (Enja, 1969–71)

With Art Farmer

- The Art Farmer Septet (Prestige, 1953–54)
- Brass Shout (United Artists, 1959)
- The Aztec Suite (United Artists, 1959)
- Listen to Art Farmer and the Orchestra (Mercury, 1962)

With Maynard Ferguson

- Ridin' High (Enterprise, 1967)

With Dizzy Gillespie

- Jazz Recital (Norgran, 1955)

With Benny Golson

- Benny Golson's New York Scene (Contemporary, 1957)

With Johnny Griffin

- White Gardenia (Riverside, 1961)

with Gigi Gryce

- Street Scenes (Vogue, 1953)
- Orchestra and Quartet (Signal, 1955); reissued as Nica's Tempo (Savoy)

With Friedrich Gulda

- Friedrich Gulda at Birdland (RCA Victor, 1957)
- A Man of Letters (Decca, 1957)

With Chico Hamilton

- The Gamut (Solid State, 1968)

With Milt Jackson

- Plenty, Plenty Soul (Atlantic, 1957)
- Big Bags (Riverside, 1962)
- For Someone I Love (Riverside, 1963)
- Ray Brown / Milt Jackson with Ray Brown (Verve, 1965)
- Memphis Jackson (Impulse!, 1969)

with Antonio Carlos Jobim

- The Composer of "Desafinado", Plays (Verve, 1963)
- Wave (CTI, 1967)

With J. J. Johnson

- J.J.! (RCA Victor, 1964)

With Quincy Jones

- Jazz Abroad (Emarcy, 1955)
- This Is How I Feel About Jazz (ABC-Paramount, 1957)
- The Birth of a Band! (Mercury, 1959)
- The Great Wide World of Quincy Jones (Mercury, 1959)
- I Dig Dancers (Mercury, 1960)
- Quincy Plays for Pussycats (Mercury, 1959-65 [1965])
- Walking in Space (A&M, 1969)

With Sam Jones

- Down Home (Riverside, 1962)

with Gene Krupa

- Gene Krupa Plays Gerry Mulligan Arrangements (Verve, 1958)

with Melba Liston

- Melba Liston and Her 'Bones (MetroJazz, 1958)

With Mundell Lowe

- TV Action Jazz! (RCA Camden, 1959)
- Satan in High Heels (soundtrack) (Charlie Parker, 1961)

With Junior Mance

- The Soul of Hollywood (Jazzland, 1962)

With Gary McFarland

- Soft Samba (Verve, 1963)

With Carmen McRae

- Something to Swing About (Kapp, 1959)

With Helen Merrill

- Dream of You (EmArcy, 1957)

With Charles Mingus

- The Complete Town Hall Concert (United Artists, 1962 [Blue Note, 1994])

With Blue Mitchell

- Smooth as the Wind (Riverside, 1961)

With the Modern Jazz Quartet

- Jazz Dialogue (Atlantic, 1965)

With Thelonious Monk

- Thelonious Monk Nonet Live in Paris 1967 (France's Concert)

With Wes Montgomery

- Movin' Wes (Verve, 1963)

With James Moody

- Moody and the Brass Figures (Milestone, 1966)

With Oliver Nelson

- Happenings with Hank Jones (Impulse!, 1966)
- Encyclopedia of Jazz (Verve, 1966)
- The Sound of Feeling (Verve, 1966)
- The Spirit of '67 co-led with Pee Wee Russell (Impulse!, 1967)

With Phineas Newborn, Jr.

- Phineas Newborn, Jr. Plays Harold Arlen's Music from Jamaica (RCA Victor, 1957)

With Joe Newman

- Salute to Satch (RCA Victor, 1956)

With Duke Pearson

- Now Hear This (Blue Note, 1968)

With Tony Perkins

- On a Rainy Afternoon (RCA Victor, 1958)

with Oscar Peterson

- With Respect to Nat (Verve, 1965)

with Oscar Pettiford

- Basically Duke (Bethlehem, 1954)
- The Oscar Pettiford Orchestra in Hi-Fi (ABC-Paramount, 1956)

With Specs Powell

- Movin' In (Roulette, 1957)

With Jerome Richardson

- Midnight Oil (New Jazz, 1959)

With Sonny Rollins

- Sonny Rollins and the Big Brass (MetroJazz, 1958; reissued as Brass & Trio, Verve)

with Jimmy Rushing

- Five Feet of Soul (Roulette, 1963)

with Lalo Schifrin

- New Fantasy (Verve, 1964)
- Once a Thief and Other Themes (Verve, 1965)

With Shirley Scott

- For Members Only (Impulse! 1963)

with Jimmy Smith

- Bashin': The Unpredictable Jimmy Smith (Verve, 1962)
- Any Number Can Win (Verve, 1963)
- The Cat...The Incredible Jimmy Smith (Verve, 1964)
- Christmas '64 (Verve, 1964)
- Jimmy & Wes: The Dynamic Duo w/ Wes Montgomery (Verve, 1966)
- Stay Loose (Verve, 1968)

With Sonny Stitt

- Sonny Stitt Plays Arrangements from the Pen of Quincy Jones (Roost, 1955)
- Sonny Stitt & the Top Brass (Atlantic, 1962)
- Broadway Soul (Colpix, 1965)

With Idrees Sulieman

- Roots (New Jazz, 1957) with the Prestige All Stars

with Billy Taylor

- My Fair Lady Loves Jazz (ABC-Paramount, 1957; reissued on Impulse!)
- Kwamina (Mercury, 1961)

with Clark Terry

- Clark Terry (EmArcy, 1955)

with Lucky Thompson

- Lucky Thompson Featuring Oscar Pettiford, Vol. 2 (ABC-Paramount, 1956; reissued on Tricotism, Impulse)

with Stanley Turrentine

- Always Something There (Blue Note, 1968)

with Sarah Vaughan

- ¡Viva! Vaughan (Verve, 1958)

with Dinah Washington

- For Those In Love (Mercury, 1955)
- The Swingin' Miss "D" (Verve, 1956)

With Randy Weston

- Uhuru Afrika (Roulette, 1960)
- Highlife (Colpix, 1963)

With Gerald Wilson

- Lomelin (Discovery, 1981)
- Jessica (Trend, 1982)

With Kai Winding

- The In Instrumentals (Verve, 1965)

With Phil Woods

- Round Trip (Verve, 1969)
