= The Dealers =

Studio album by Mal Waldron
- Released: 1964
- Recorded: April 19, 1957 and September 20, 1957
- Genre: Jazz
- Label: Status Records
- Producer: Bob Weinstock

The Dealers is a 1964 album by jazz musician Mal Waldron released on Status Records, catalogue 8316. The album consists of unreleased takes from two sessions that resulted in two prior albums. "Blue Calypso" and "Falling In Love With Love" are from the April 19, 1957 session that resulted in half of 1957 Waldron's Mal/2 album; these tracks can currently be found as additional tracks on the CD reissue of that album. "Dealin'" and "Wheelin" are from a September 20, 1957 session, and are alternate takes of tracks originally released on the 1958 Wheelin' & Dealin' album (Prestige PRLP 7131); these tracks can currently be found as additional tracks on the CD reissue of that album. All tracks are also available as part of the 2009 John Coltrane box set Side Steps.

== Track listing ==
=== Side one ===
1. "Blue Calypso" — 8:56
2. "Falling in Love With Love" — 11:37

=== Side two ===
1. "Dealin' (alternate take)" — 10:00
2. "Wheelin' (alternate take)" — 10:24

== Personnel ==
- Mal Waldron — piano
- Bill Hardman — trumpet on side one
- Jackie McLean — alto saxophone on side one
- John Coltrane — tenor saxophone
- Paul Quinichette — tenor saxophone on side two
- Frank Wess — tenor saxophone and flute on side two
- Julian Euell — bass on side one
- Doug Watkins — bass on side two
- Art Taylor — drums
