= Reality (Monk Montgomery album) =

Studio album by Monk Montgomery
- Released: 1974
- Genre: Jazz
- Label: Philadelphia International
- Producer: Bobby Martin

Monk Montgomery chronology
Bass Odyssey (1971)	Reality (1974)	Monk Montgomery in Africa...Live! (1974)

Professional ratings
Review scores
Source	Rating
Allmusic	3/5 stars

Reality is a 1974 album by jazz bassist Monk Montgomery, one of his four solo albums. It was released by Philadelphia International Records.

== Track listing ==
1. "Reality" – 5:39
2. "Me and Mrs. Jones" – 3:09
3. "Sippin' and Tippin'" – 4:54
4. "Bump de Bump" – 3:15
5. "I Love You Camille" – 5:20
6. "Little O's" – 5:56
7. "Girl Talk" – 5:06

== Personnel ==
- Monk Montgomery – bass
- Danny Skea – piano and clavinet
- Ron Feuer – organ
- Santo Sazino – drums
- Earl Young – drums
- Norman Harris – guitar
- Bobby Martin – Fender Rhodes
- Ron Kersey – piano & clavinet
- Vincent Montana Jr. – vibes
- Larry Washington – bongos & congas
- Ronnie Baker – bass
- Don Renaldo's Strings and Horns
