= Cleveland Style =

Studio album by Jimmy Cleveland
- Released: 1958
- Recorded: December 12 & 13, 1957; New York City
- Genre: Jazz
- Length: 32:21
- Label: EmArcy; MG 36126

Jimmy Cleveland chronology
Introducing Jimmy Cleveland and His All Stars (1955)	Cleveland Style (1958)	A Map of Jimmy Cleveland (1959)

Cleveland Style is an album led by American trombonist Jimmy Cleveland featuring tracks recorded in 1957. It was released on the EmArcy label.

== Reception ==
Professional ratings
Review scores
Source	Rating
Allmusic	3/5 stars

The Allmusic review stated " it is not surprising that the result is high-quality straightahead jazz. Worth searching for".

== Track listing ==
1. "Out of This World" (Harold Arlen, Johnny Mercer) - 4:11
2. "All This and Heaven Too" (Jimmy Van Heusen, Eddie DeLange) - 5:49
3. "Posterity" (Trevor Duncan) - 4:52
4. "Long Ago (and Far Away)" (Jerome Kern, Ira Gershwin) - 3:28
5. "A Jazz Ballad" (Ernie Wilkins) - 4:11
6. "Jimmie's Tune" (Jimmy Cleveland) - 3:40
7. "Goodbye Ebbets Field" (Wilkins) - 6:10

== Personnel ==
- Jimmy Cleveland - trombone
- Art Farmer - trumpet
- Don Butterfield (tracks 1, 4 & 7), Jimmy McAllister (tracks 2, 3 5 & 6) - tuba
- Benny Golson - tenor saxophone
- Wynton Kelly - piano
- Eddie Jones - bass
- Charlie Persip - drums
- Ernie Wilkins - arranger, conductor
