= Al Hayse =

American jazz musician (1921–1982)

Alvin Cooper Hayse (April 7, 1921 - 11 May 1982) was an American jazz trombonist.

== Life and career ==
Al Hayse was born in Detroit on April 7, 1921. Early in his career Hayse played with Snookum Russell and Kelly Martin. He joined McKinney's Cotton Pickers in 1939, and then played with Lionel Hampton from 1943 to 1946. He worked with Milt Buckner in 1950, then returned to duty under Hampton in 1951, remaining with him through 1956. While with Hampton he also recorded with Gigi Gryce and Clifford Brown in Europe. Hayse was the composer of the tune "Sergeant's Mess", recorded by Stan Kenton. He dropped out of the scene after the 1950s.

Hayse died in Detroit on 11 May 1982.
