= Bass Odyssey (album) =

Studio album by Monk Montgomery
- Released: 1971
- Genre: Jazz
- Label: Motown
- Producer: Wayne Henderson, Stewart Levine

Monk Montgomery chronology
It's Never Too Late (1969)	Bass Odyssey (1971)	Reality (1974)

Bass Odyssey is an album by jazz bassist Monk Montgomery, one of his four solo albums. It was released in 1971 on Motown Records/Chisa Records.

The album was produced by Stewart Levine, and Wayne Henderson of The Crusaders. Henderson also plays on the album with fellow Crusaders Joe Sample and Stix Hooper.

Montgomery is seen on the album cover with a Fender Jazz Bass and a Versatone amplifier.

== Track listing ==
All songs were composed by Monk Montgomery except "Personage", which his brother Buddy Montgomery wrote.

1. "Journey to the Bottom"
2. "Personage"
3. "Sister Lena"
4. "Fuselage, Pt. 1"
5. "Fuselage, Pt. 2"
6. "Foxy Gypsy"

== Personnel ==
- Monk Montgomery - lead electric bass on all selections and fuzz bass on "Fuselage"
- Joe Sample - electric piano.
- Mike Carven - drums on "Foxy Gypsy", "Journey to the Bottom" and "Personage"
- Wayne Henderson - drums on "Fuselage"
- Stix Hooper - drums on "Sister Lena"
- Andy Simpkins - upright bass on "Journey to the Bottom", "Foxy Gypsy" and "Personage"
- Kent Brinkley - upright bass on "Sister Lena"
