= Rhythm Crazy =

Studio album by Jimmy Cleveland
- Released: 1964
- Recorded: February 1959; New York City
- Genre: Jazz
- Length: 31:01
- Label: EmArcy; MGE 26003
- Producer: Jack Tracy

Jimmy Cleveland chronology
A Map of Jimmy Cleveland (1959)	Rhythm Crazy (1964)

Rhythm Crazy is an album led by American trombonist Jimmy Cleveland. It features tracks recorded in 1959, but the LP was not released by the EmArcy label until 1964.

== Reception ==
Professional ratings
Review scores
Source	Rating
Allmusic	4.5/5 stars

The Allmusic review stated: "Long out of print, this Emarcy LP is long overdue to be reissued on CD".

== Track listing ==
1. "Crazy Rhythm" (Irving Caesar, Roger Wolfe Kahn, Joseph Meyer) - 3:55
2. "Old Reliable" (Oscar Pettiford) - 4:16
3. "We Never Kissed" (Melba Liston) - 3:46
4. "Tom-Kattin'" (Lucky Thompson) - 3:33
5. "Our Delight" (Tadd Dameron) - 4:30
6. "Reminiscing" (Gigi Gryce) - 3:02
7. "Tricotism" (Pettiford) - 7:59

== Personnel ==
- Jimmy Cleveland - trombone
- Art Farmer - trumpet
- Jerome Richardson - flute, tenor saxophone, baritone saxophone
- Benny Golson - tenor saxophone, arranger
- Hank Jones - piano
- Milt Hinton - bass
- Osie Johnson - drums
- Gigi Gryce - arranger
