= Companionship (album) =

Compilation of Sahib Shihab's jazz recordings

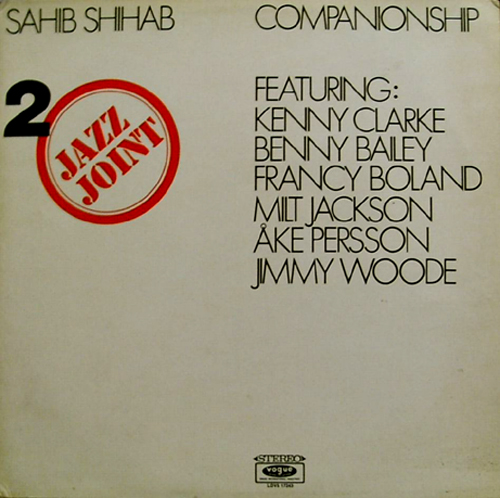

Compilation album by Sahib Shihab
- Released: 1971
- Recorded: 1964–1970; Cologne, West Germany
- Genre: Jazz
- Length: 78:26
- Label: Vogue Schallplatten; LDVS 17243
- Producer: Gigi Campi

Sahib Shihab chronology
Seeds (1968)	Companionship (1971)	Sentiments (1972)

Companionship (subtitled Jazz Joint 2) is a double album compiling recordings from 1964 to 1970 by American jazz saxophonist/flautist Sahib Shihab which was released on the German Vogue Schallplatten label.

== Reception ==
Professional ratings
Review scores
Source	Rating
AllMusic	4.5/5 stars

AllMusic gave the album 4½ stars.

== Track listing ==
1. "Om Mani Padme Hum" (Francy Boland) – 5:41
2. "Bohemia After Dark" (Oscar Pettiford) – 3:40
3. "Companionship" (Sahib Shihab, Niels-Henning Ørsted Pedersen) – 3:33
4. "Stoned Ghosts" (Benny Bailey) – 5:04
5. "Jay – Jay" (Kenny Clarke) – 2:52
6. "Dijdar" (Jimmy Woode) – 4:24
7. "Con Alma" (Dizzy Gillespie) – 5:05
8. "CT + CB" (Bailey) – 5:22
9. "The Turk's Bolero" (Boland) – 2:50
10. "Talk Some Yak-Ee-Dak" (Woode) – 3:32
11. "Calypso Blues" (Nat King Cole) – 4:07
12. "Balafon" (Boland) – 3:06
13. "I'm a Fool to Want You" (Frank Sinatra, Jack Wolf, Joel Herron) – 4:23
14. "Insensatez" (Antônio Carlos Jobim, Vinícius de Moraes) – 2:42
15. "Invitation" (Bronisław Kaper) – 4:39
16. "Yah-Yah Blues" (Shihab) – 4:01
17. "Serenata" (Leroy Anderson) – 3:26
18. "Just Give Me Time" (Boland) – 3:13
19. "Born to Be Blue" (Mel Tormé, Robert Wells) – 3:49
20. "Sconsolato" (Woode) – 2:30

== Personnel ==
- Sahib Shihab – baritone saxophone, flute
- Benny Bailey – trumpet, flugelhorn (tracks 3, 4 & 8)
- Idrees Sulieman – trumpet (track 9)
- Åke Persson – trombone (tracks 6 & 9)
- Francy Boland – piano (tracks 1, 2, 5, 7, 9, 11, 12 & 14–20)
- Jimmy Woode – bass, vocals
- Kenny Clarke – drums
- Fats Sadi – vibraphone percussion (tracks 1, 2, 5, 7, 11, 12 & 14–20)
- Joe Harris – percussion (tracks 1, 2, 5, 7, 11, 12 & 14–20)
- Milt Jackson – vocals (track 13)
