= Saying Somethin'! =

Studio album by Gigi Gryce
- Released: 1960
- Recorded: March 11, 1960
- Studio: Van Gelder Studio, Englewood Cliffs, New Jersey
- Genre: Jazz
- Length: 39:23
- Label: New Jazz; NJLP 8230
- Producer: Esmond Edwards

Gigi Gryce chronology
Gigi Gryce (1958)	Saying Somethin'! (1960)	The Hap'nin's (1960)

Saying Somethin'! is an album by American saxophonist Gigi Gryce recorded in 1960 for the New Jazz label.

== Reception ==
Professional ratings
Review scores
Source	Rating
AllMusic	4/5 stars
The Penguin Guide to Jazz Recordings	3/4 stars

AllMusic reviewer Scott Yanow awarded the album 4 stars stating "There is more variety than expected and the contrast between Gryce's lyricism and the extroverted nature of Williams's solos make this set fairly memorable."

== Track listing ==
All compositions by Gigi Gryce except as indicated

1. "Back Breaker" – 6:08
2. "Leila's Blues" – 6:47
3. "Blues in the Jungle" – 6:16
4. "Down Home" (Curtis Fuller) – 8:19
5. "Let Me Know" (Hank Jones) – 4:43
6. "Jones' Bones" (Jones) – 7:10

== Personnel ==
- Gigi Gryce – alto saxophone
- Richard Williams – trumpet (tracks 1, 2, 4 & 5)
- Richard Wyands – piano
- Reggie Workman – bass
- Mickey Roker – drums
