= It's Never Too Late (Monk Montgomery album) =

Studio album by Monk Montgomery
- Released: 1969
- Genre: Jazz
- Label: Motown
- Producer: Stewart Levine, Wayne Henderson

Monk Montgomery chronology
It's Never Too Late (1969)	Bass Odyssey (1971)

Professional ratings
Review scores
Source	Rating
Allmusic	2/5 stars

It's Never Too Late is an album by jazz bassist Monk Montgomery, released in 1969 on Chisa Records/Motown Records. It is the first of his four solo albums, and features members of The Crusaders.

A 7" single was released of "A Place in the Sun"/"Your Love" on Chisa Records.

== Track listing ==
1. "Big Boy" (Wayne Henderson, Arthur Adams) – 5:44 arranged by Dale Frank, Wayne Henderson
2. "Sunday Stroll" (Joe Sample) – 2:38 arranged by Joe Sample
3. "Can We Talk To You?" (Wilton Felder, Arthur Adams) – 2:19 arranged by Wilton Felder
4. "Your Love" (Wilton Felder) – 2:22 arranged by Wayne Henderson
5. "A Place In The Sun" (Ron Miller, Bryan Wells) – 2:45 arranged by Wayne Henderson
6. "It's Never Too Late" (Monk Montgomery) – 3:18. arranged by Joe Sample
7. "The Lady" (Dorothy Masuka) – 3:27 arranged by Hugh Masekela
8. "Bluesette" (Norman Gimbel, Toots Thielemans) – 3:27 arranged by Frank Kavelin
9. "My Cherie Amour" (Henry Cosby, Sylvia Moy, Stevie Wonder) – 3:11 arranged by Wayne Henderson
10. "How High The Moon" (Nancy Hamilton, Morgan Lewis) – 4:50 arranged by Dale Frank, Wayne Henderson

== Personnel ==
- Monk Montgomery - electric bass
- Donn Landee, Jud Phillips - engineer
- Directed by Stewart Levine and Wayne Henderson
- Barry Feinstein, Tom Wilkes - design, photography
