= Reconstruction (Hugh Masekela album) =

Studio album by Hugh Masekela
- Released: July 1970
- Studio: Wally Heider Studios, San Francisco
- Genre: Jazz
- Label: Chisa Records CS 803
- Producer: Stewart Levine

Hugh Masekela chronology
Masekela (1969)	Reconstruction (1970)	Hugh Masekela & The Union of South Africa (1971)

Professional ratings
Review scores
Source	Rating
The Encyclopedia of Popular Music	3/5 stars
The Rolling Stone Jazz & Blues Album Guide	2.5/5 stars

Reconstruction is the twelfth studio album by South African jazz trumpeter Hugh Masekela released via Chisa Records label in July 1970. The album was re-released on CD in 1994 via MoJazz label.

== Track listing ==
No.	Title	Writer(s)	Length
1.	"You Keep Me Hangin' On"	Brian Holland, Lamont Dozier, Edward Holland, Jr.	3:37
2.	"I Will"	John Lennon, Paul McCartney	3:07
3.	"I Can't Dance"	Hugh Masekela	3:34
4.	"Father Time (Maybe Then You'll Know)"	Hugh Masekela	2:57
5.	"Make Me a Potion"	Caiphus Semenya	5:35
6.	"Sala Le Mane"	Hugh Masekela	5:00
7.	"Leave Us Alone"	Hugh Masekela	4:25
8.	"Woza"	Hugh Masekela	2:25
9.	"Both Sides Now"	Joni Mitchell	2:17
10.	"Traces"	Buddy Buie, Emory Gordy, James B. Cobb Jr.	5:39

== Personnel ==
- Arranged by – Hugh Masekela (tracks: 5 6 7 8 9), Wayne Henderson (tracks: 3)
- Bass – Hal Dodson (tracks: 6), Monk Montgomery (tracks: 1, 2, 5, 7, 8, 10), Wilton Felder (tracks: 1 3 4 5 6 7 8 9)
- Congas – Francisco Aguabella (tracks: 1 3 4 5 7 8 9)
- Design, photography – Barry Feinstein, Camouflage Productions, Tom Wilkes
- Directed by – Stewart Levine
- Drums – Al Foster (tracks: 1 2 5 6 7 8 10), Wayne Henderson (tracks: 1 3 4 5 7 8 9)
- Electric piano – Joseph Sample (tracks: 1 3 4 5 7 8 9)
- Engineer – Larry Cox, Rik Pekkonen
- Guitar – Arthur Adams (tracks: 1 2 3 4 5 7 8 9 10), Bruce Langhorne (tracks: 3 4 9)
- Orchestrated by – Dale Frank (tracks: 1 10), Frank Kavelin (tracks: 2 4)
- Piano – Larry Willis
- Vocals – Caiphus Semenya (tracks: 1 5 7 9), Larry Willis (tracks: 6), Letta Mbulu (tracks: 1 5 7 8), Philemon Hou (tracks: 1 5 7 8)
