= Seeds (Sahib Shihab album) =

Studio album by Sahib Shihab Quintet
- Released: 1969
- Recorded: June 9, 1968
- Studio: Lindström Studios, Cologne, West Germany
- Genre: Jazz
- Length: 36:04
- Label: Vogue Schallplatten; LDVS 17165
- Producer: Gigi Campi

Sahib Shihab chronology
Sahib Shihab and the Danish Radio Jazz Group (1965)	Seeds (1969)	Companionship (1964-70)

Seeds is an album by American jazz saxophonist/flautist Sahib Shihab recorded in 1968 which was released on the German Vogue Schallplatten label.

== Reception ==
Professional ratings
Review scores
Source	Rating
Allmusic	4/5 stars

The Allmusic site gave the album 4 stars.

== Track listing ==
All compositions by Sahib Shihab except where noted.

1. "Seeds" - 4:05
2. "Peter's Waltz" - 5:07
3. "Set Up" (Jimmy Woode) - 3:00
4. "Who'll Buy My Dream" (Woode) - 3:57
5. "Jay Jay" (Kenny Clarke) - 2:55
6. "Another Samba" - 3:06
7. "My Kind'a World" (Woode) - 3:48
8. "Uma Fita de Tres Cores" (Francy Boland) - 3:04
9. "Mauve" (Boland) - 3:05
10. "The Wild Man" (Clarke) - 3:40

== Personnel ==
- Sahib Shihab - baritone saxophone, flute
- Francy Boland - piano
- Jimmy Woode (tracks 1–8), Jean Warland (tracks 9 & 10) - bass
- Kenny Clarke - drums
- Fats Sadi - vibraphone marimba, bongos
