= Movin' In (album) =

Studio album by Specs Powell
- Released: 1957
- Recorded: February 13 & 20, 1957
- Studio: New York City
- Genre: Jazz
- Length: 46:00
- Label: Roulette; R/SR-52004
- Producer: Specs Powell

Movin' In is an album by drummer Specs Powell released by the Roulette label in 1957.

Professional ratings
Review scores
Source	Rating
AllMusic	4/5 stars
Disc	4/5 stars

== Track listing ==
All compositions by Specs Powell except where noted

1. "Undecided" (Charlie Shavers, Sid Robin) – 2:49
2. "All or Nothing at All" (Arthur Altman, Jack Lawrence) – 3:00
3. "It's Pity to Say Goodnight" (Mack Gordon, Billy Reid) – 2:48
4. "You Don't Know What Love Is" (Gene de Paul, Don Raye) – 2:35
5. "The Spider" – 5:21
6. "Rat Race" – 2:49
7. "Suspension" – 3:29
8. "Locked Out" – 2:50
9. "He's My Guy" (de Paul, Raye) – 2:39
10. "I'll Remember April" (de Paul, Raye, Patricia Johnston) – 2:31
11. "Dispossessed" (Powell, Henry Glover) – 2:35
12. "Moving In" – 3:01

== Personnel ==
- Specs Powell – drums
- Ray Copeland – trumpet, arranger
- Leon Merian – trumpet
- Jimmie Dahl, Jimmy Cleveland – trombone
- George Dorsey – alto saxophone, flute
- Sahib Shihab – alto saxophone, baritone saxophone
- Aaron Sachs – tenor saxophone, clarinet
- Pritchard Cheeseman – baritone saxophone
- Hank Jones, Nat Pierce – piano
- Clyde Lombardi – bass
