= Early Art =

Studio album by Art Farmer
- Released: 1962
- Recorded: January 20 & November 9, 1954
- Studio: Van Gelder Studio, Hackensack, New Jersey
- Genre: Jazz
- Length: 41:52
- Label: New Jazz; NJLP 8258
- Producer: Bob Weinstock

Art Farmer chronology
The Art Farmer Septet (1953)	Early Art (1962)	When Farmer Met Gryce (1955)

Early Art is an album by trumpeter Art Farmer featuring two sessions recorded in 1954 which was originally released on LP on the New Jazz label in the early 1960s.

== Reception ==
Professional ratings
Review scores
Source	Rating
Down Beat (Original Lp release)	3.5/5 stars
Allmusic	4/5 stars
The Rolling Stone Jazz Record Guide	4/5 stars

In his review for Allmusic, Scott Yanow said "the music is quite enjoyable and a must for 1950s bop collectors".

== Track listing ==
The programming differs from what is listed, with "Soft Shoe" (which should have been the opener) actually appearing fifth and the songs listed as appearing second through fifth moving up to first through fourth. All compositions by Art Farmer except as indicated

1. "Confab in Tempo" - 3:54
2. "I'll Take Romance" (Oscar Hammerstein II, Ben Oakland) - 4:57
3. "Wisteria" - 4:32
4. "Autumn Nocturne" (Kim Gannon, Josef Myrow) - 4:05
5. "Soft Shoe" - 4:59
6. "I've Never Been in Love Before" (Frank Loesser) - 3:49
7. "I'll Walk Alone" (Jule Styne, Sammy Cahn) - 3:55
8. "Gone With the Wind" (Herbert Magidson, Allie Wrubel) - 4:07
9. "Alone Together" (Arthur Schwartz, Howard Dietz) - 3:59
10. "Pre Amp" - 3:35
- Recorded at Van Gelder Studio in Hackensack, New Jersey on January 20 (tracks 1–3, 5) and November 9 (tracks 4, 6–10), 1954

== Personnel ==
- Art Farmer – trumpet
- Sonny Rollins – tenor saxophone (tracks 1–2, 5)
- Horace Silver (tracks 1–3, 5), Wynton Kelly (tracks 4, 6–10) – piano
- Percy Heath (tracks 1–3, 5), Addison Farmer (tracks 4, 6–10) – bass
- Kenny Clarke (tracks 1–3, 5), Herbie Lovelle (tracks 4, 6–10) – drums
