= Jazz Lab (Jubilee album) =

Studio album by Gigi Gryce & Donald Byrd
- Released: 1958
- Recorded: August 9, 1957; New York City
- Genre: Jazz
- Label: Jubilee; JLP 1059
- Producer: Lee Kraft

Gigi Gryce chronology
New Formulas from the Jazz Lab (1957)	Jazz Lab (1958)	Modern Jazz Perspective (1957)

Jazz Lab is an album by American jazz saxophonist Gigi Gryce and trumpeter Donald Byrd featuring tracks recorded in 1957 and released on the Jubilee label.

== Reception ==
Professional ratings
Review scores
Source	Rating
Allmusic	3/5 stars

Allmusic awarded the album 3 stars.

== Track listing ==
All compositions by Gigi Gryce except as indicated

1. "Blue Lights" - 4:00
2. "Onion Head" (Donald Byrd) - 4:44
3. "Isn't It Romantic?" (Richard Rodgers, Lorenz Hart) - 4:51
4. "Bat Land" - 7:05
5. "Bangoon" (Hank Jones) - 4:57
6. "Imagination" (Jimmy Van Heusen, Johnny Burke) - 5:40
7. "Xtacy" (Byrd) - 8:32

== Personnel ==
- Gigi Gryce - alto saxophone - except 3
- Donald Byrd - trumpet - except 6
- Hank Jones - piano
- Paul Chambers - bass
- Art Taylor - drums
