= Modern Jazz Perspective =

Studio album by Donald Byrd and Gigi Gryce
- Released: 1957
- Recorded: August 30 and September 3 & 5, 1957; New York City
- Genre: Jazz
- Label: Columbia; CL 1058

Gigi Gryce chronology
Jazz Lab (1957)	Modern Jazz Perspective (1957)	Gigi Gryce (1958)

Donald Byrd chronology
Jazz Lab (1957)	Modern Jazz Perspective (1957)	Jazz Eyes (1957)

Modern Jazz Perspective is an album by American jazz trumpeter Donald Byrd and saxophonist Gigi Gryce, with featured vocalist Jackie Paris, recorded in 1957 for the Columbia label.

== Reception ==
Professional ratings
Review scores
Source	Rating
AllMusic	3/5 stars
Disc	4/5 stars

== Track listing ==
All compositions by Gigi Gryce except as indicated

1. "Medley: Early Morning Blues (Cy Coleman, Joseph McCarthy)/ Now, Don't You Know" (Gryce, as "Lee Sears") – 3:45
2. "Early Bird" (Donald Byrd) – 7:31
3. "Elgy" (Byrd) – 6:28
4. "Stablemates" (Benny Golson) – 4:59
5. "Steppin' Out" – 5:30
6. "Social Call" – 4:43
7. "An Evening in Casablanca" – 5:05
8. "Satellite" – 4:26
- Recorded in New York City on August 30, 1957 (tracks 6–8), September 3, 1957 (tracks 1–3), and September 5, 1957 (tracks 4 & 5)

== Personnel ==
- Gigi Gryce – alto saxophone
- Donald Byrd – trumpet
- Jimmy Cleveland – trombone (tracks 4 & 5)
- Julius Watkins – French horn (tracks 4 & 5)
- Sahib Shihab – baritone saxophone (tracks 4 & 5)
- Wynton Kelly – piano
- Wendell Marshall – bass
- Art Taylor – drums
- Jackie Paris – banjo (track 1), vocals (tracks 1–3)
- S. Neil Fujita – cover artwork
