= Gigi Gryce and the Jazz Lab Quintet =

Studio album by Gigi Gryce
- Released: 1957
- Recorded: February 27 & March 7, 1957
- Studio: Reeves Sound Studios, New York City
- Genre: Jazz
- Length: 40:04
- Label: Riverside; RLP 12-229
- Producer: Orrin Keepnews

Gigi Gryce chronology
| Jazz Lab (1957) | Gigi Gryce and the Jazz Lab Quintet (1957) | At Newport (1957) |

Gigi Gryce and the Jazz Lab Quintet is an album by American jazz saxophonist Gigi Gryce, recorded in 1957 for the Riverside label.

== Reception ==
Professional ratings
Review scores
| Source | Rating |
|---|---|
| AllMusic | 4.5/5 stars |
| The Penguin Guide to Jazz Recordings | 3/4 stars |

AllMusic awarded the album 4½ stars, stating: "This is exciting and still fresh-sounding bebop."

== Track listing ==
All compositions by Gigi Gryce except as indicated

1. "Love for Sale" (Cole Porter) – 7:59
2. "Geraldine" (Wade Legge) – 5:34
3. "Minority" – 6:26
4. "Zing! Went the Strings of My Heart" (James F. Hanley) – 5:59
5. "Straight Ahead" (Gryce as "Lee Sears") – 9:29
6. "Wake Up!" – 4:37
- Recorded at Reeves Sound Studios in New York City on February 27, 1957 (tracks 1–3) and March 7, 1957 (tracks 4–6)

== Personnel ==
- Gigi Gryce – alto saxophone
- Donald Byrd – trumpet
- Wade Legge – piano
- Wendell Marshall – bass
- Art Taylor – drums
