= Janet Thurlow =

American jazz singer (1926–2022)

Janet Lorraine Cleveland
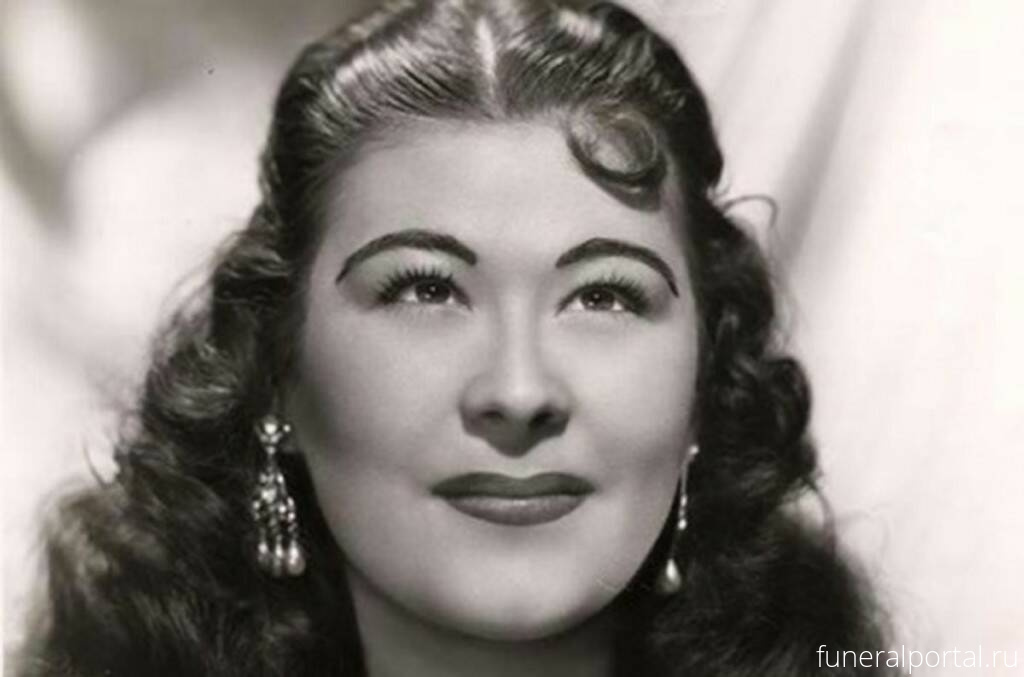
- Born: Janet Lorraine Thurlow; May 21, 1926; Seattle, Washington
- Died: October 4, 2022 (aged 96); Lynwood, California
- Spouse: Jimmy Cleveland (m. 1953-2008; his death)

Janet Lorraine Cleveland (nee Thurlow) (May 21, 1926 – October 4, 2022) was an American jazz singer. She was most known for her work on Seattle's Jackson Street and with the Lionel Hampton and Charles Mingus orchestras.

== Early life ==
Thurlow was born on May 21, 1926, in Seattle, Washington, the oldest of five children. She took violin, piano, and singing lessons as a teenager. As a child, she sang on the Major Bowes Amateur Hour hosted by Major Edward Bowes. She attended Broadway High School in Seattle, but had to drop out after ninth grade to care for her siblings after her parents' divorce. A few years later, Thurlow moved into her own apartment after her mother's death, befriended musician Ray Charles, and began cultivating an appreciation of jazz, as well as jazz singing.

== Career ==
In 1949, she began as a "song stylist" with Robert "Bumps" Blackwell's Seattle-based band, which at that time had Quincy Jones as arranger and trumpet player and Ray Charles, then known as "R.C.", playing piano and alto sax.

=== Lionel Hampton Orchestra ===
In 1950, Lionel Hampton hired her to play with his band. Thurlow convinced Hampton to hire her friend Quincy Jones as a trumpeter. In the April 1951, Thurlow recorded the song "I Can't Believe You're in Love with Me" with Hampton's orchestra for Decca Records. Mike Barnes wrote that this recording made "her perhaps the first white singer to front an all-Black big band." In August 1951, Thurlow performed with Hampton's orchestra at the Paramount Theater in Hollywood. Later that month, they performed at the Trianon Ballroom in Seattle that featured Jones and Thurlow as the "Two Seattleites". After her departure from the Lionel Hampton orchestra, Thurlow joined Charles Mingus' band, becoming the vocalist on several songs such as "Blue Tide" and "Eclipse". In November 1952, Thurlow converted to the Jehovah's Witnesses. By April 1953, Thurlow had left Hampton's orchestra and was performing solo in Chicago. During this time, she began to volunteer as a violinist at Jehovah's Witnesses' regional conventions at New York's Yankee Stadium, Philadelphia's Connie Mack Stadium, and Los Angeles' Dodger Stadium.

== Personal life and death ==
In 1951, Thurlow met trombonist Jimmy Cleveland, a fellow band member with Hampton's orchestra. They married on April 2, 1953 in Chicago. In 1967, the couple moved from New York City to Lynwood, California. Thurlow began teaching vocal music but did not perform jazz again until 1983, when she began occasionally performing and recording with her husband until his death in 2008.

Thurlow died of heart failure, aged 96, at St. Francis Medical Center in Lynwood in 2022. She was buried beside her husband at Riverside National Cemetery.

== Discography ==
Albums/EP's

- Charles Mingus Octet (October 27, 1953): tracks "Blue Tide", "Eclipse", "Pink Topsy", "Miss Bliss"

Singles

- I Can't Believe You're in Love with Me (1951, with Lionel Hampton and his orchestra)
- Cool Train (with Lionel Hampton and his orchestra)
- Gladysee Bounce (with Lionel Hampton and his orchestra)
- Airmail Special (with Lionel Hampton and his orchestra)
