= Mal/2 =

Studio album by Mal Waldron
- Released: November 1957
- Recorded: April 19 and May 17, 1957
- Genre: Jazz
- Length: 46:34
- Label: Prestige

Mal Waldron chronology
Mal-1 (1956)	Mal/2 (1957)	The Dealers (1957)

Mal/2 is an album by the American jazz pianist Mal Waldron. It was released through Prestige Records in November 1957. The CD reissue added two additional recordings from the same sessions originally released on The Dealers (1957) as bonus tracks.

== Reception ==
The AllMusic review by Stephen Cook stated, "Waldron here leads a potent crew on an engaging and original set of arrangements. A cut above many of the relatively straightforward and blues-based hard bop dates of the time".

Professional ratings
Review scores
Source	Rating
AllMusic	4/5 stars
The Penguin Guide to Jazz Recordings	3/4 stars

== Track listing ==
All compositions by Mal Waldron except as indicated

1. "From This Moment On" (Cole Porter) – 6:15
2. "J.M.'s Dream Doll" – 8:39
3. "The Way You Look Tonight" (Dorothy Fields, Jerome Kern) – 8:25
4. "One by One" – 9:41
5. "Don't Explain" (Arthur Herzog Jr., Billie Holiday) – 6:58
6. "Potpourri" – 6:36

CD reissue

7. "Blue Calypso" – 8:58 Bonus track on CD reissue
8. "Falling in Love with Love" (Lorenz Hart, Richard Rodgers) – 11:39 Bonus track on CD reissue

- Recorded at Van Gelder Studio in Hackensack, New Jersey, on April 19 (tracks 2, 5, 6, 7, 8) and May 17 (tracks 1, 3, 4), 1957.

== Personnel ==
- Mal Waldron — piano
- John Coltrane — tenor saxophone
- Idrees Sulieman (tracks 1, 3, 4), Bill Hardman (tracks 2, 5, 6, 7, 8) — trumpet
- Sahib Shihab — alto saxophone and baritone saxophone (tracks 1, 3, 4)
- Jackie McLean — alto saxophone (tracks 2, 5, 6, 7, 8)
- Julian Euell — bass
- Ed Thigpen (tracks 1, 3, 4), Art Taylor (tracks 2, 5, 6, 7, 8) — drums
