= Gigi Gryce (album) =

Studio album by Gigi Gryce
- Released: 1958
- Recorded: June 1958
- Studio: New York City
- Genre: Jazz
- Length: 33:51
- Label: MetroJazz; E 1006
- Producer: Leonard Feather

Gigi Gryce chronology
Modern Jazz Perspective (1957)	Gigi Gryce (1958)	Saying Somethin'! (1960)

Gigi Gryce is an album by American jazz saxophonist Gigi Gryce, recorded in 1958 and released on the MetroJazz label.

== Reception ==
Professional ratings
Review scores
Source	Rating
AllMusic	3/5 stars

AllMusic awarded the album 3 stars, stating: "A fine mainstream date, but probably long gone."

== Track listing ==
1. "In a Sentimental Mood" (Duke Ellington, Irving Mills, Manny Kurtz) - 3:35
2. "Blues March" (Benny Golson) - 3:03
3. "Seabreeze" (Larry Douglas, Fred Norman, Romare Bearden) - 2:30
4. "Bangoon" (Hank Jones) - 2:43
5. "It Don't Mean a Thing" (Ellington, Mills) - 3:16
6. "Cold Breeze" (Wade Legge) - 2:36
7. "Rich and Creamy" (Jack Lazare) - 3:29
8. "My Ideal" (Richard Whiting, Newell Chase, Leo Robin) - 2:48
9. "Baba's Blues" (Gigi Gryce) - 2:59
10. "Little Susan" (Randy Weston) - 2:29
11. "Lullaby for Milkman" (Lazare) - 2:30
12. "Somewhere" (Ray Copeland) - 2:36

== Personnel ==
- Gigi Gryce - alto saxophone, tenor saxophone, baritone saxophone, clarinet, piccolo, flute
- Hank Jones - piano, celeste
- Milt Hinton - bass
- Osie Johnson - drums
