= A Map of Jimmy Cleveland =

Studio album by Jimmy Cleveland
- Released: 1959
- Recorded: December 16, 17 & 18, 1958; Fine Recording, New York City
- Genre: Jazz
- Label: Mercury; MG 20442
- Producer: Hal Mooney

Jimmy Cleveland chronology
Cleveland Style (1958)	A Map of Jimmy Cleveland (1959)	Rhythm Crazy (1959)

A Map of Jimmy Cleveland is an album led by American trombonist Jimmy Cleveland featuring tracks recorded in 1958. It was released on the Mercury label.

== Reception ==
Professional ratings
Review scores
Source	Rating
Allmusic	4/5 stars

The Allmusic review stated: "Trombonist Jimmy Cleveland made a series of outstanding LPs for Emarcy and Mercury during the 1950s... this collectable LP is well worth tracking down".

== Track listing ==
1. "Swing Low, Sweet Chariot" (Traditional) - 5:15
2. "A Hundred Years from Today" (Victor Young, Joe Young, Ned Washington) - 4:36
3. "Marie" (Irving Berlin) - 4:45
4. "Jay Bird" (J. J. Johnson) - 3:30
5. "The Best Things in Life Are Free" (Ray Henderson, Buddy DeSylva, Lew Brown) - 4:28
6. "Stardust" (Hoagy Carmichael, Mitchell Parish) - 4:51
7. "Jimmy's Old Funky Blues" (Ernie Wilkins) - 8:43

== Personnel ==
- Jimmy Cleveland - trombone
- Ray Copeland - trumpet
- Ernie Royal - flugelhorn
- Don Butterfield - tuba
- Jerome Richardson - tenor saxophone, flute
- Junior Mance - piano
- Bill Crow - bass
- Art Taylor - drums
- Ernie Wilkins - arranger
