= Introducing Jimmy Cleveland and His All Stars =

Studio album by Jimmy Cleveland
- Released: 1956
- Recorded: August 4 & 12, and November 22, 1955; New York City
- Genre: Jazz
- Length: 55:48
- Label: EmArcy; MG 36066

Jimmy Cleveland chronology
Introducing Jimmy Cleveland and His All Stars (1956)	Cleveland Style (1958)

Introducing Jimmy Cleveland and His All Stars is the debut album led by American trombonist Jimmy Cleveland featuring tracks recorded in 1955. It was released on the EmArcy label.

== Reception ==
Professional ratings
Review scores
Source	Rating
Allmusic	4/5 stars

The Allmusic review stated "although many of his sidemen get fine spots, Cleveland generally wins solo honors".

== Track listing ==
1. "Hear Ye! Hear Ye!" (Jimmy Cleveland, Jerry Jones) - 5:49
2. "You Don't Know What Love Is" (Gene de Paul, Don Raye) - 4:59
3. "Vixen" (Leonard Feather) - 4:28
4. "My One and Only Love" (Guy Wood, Robert Mellin) - 4:02
5. "Little Beaver" (Cleveland, Jones) - 7:45
6. "Love Is Here to Stay" (George Gershwin, Ira Gershwin) - 3:32
7. "Count 'Em" (Quincy Jones) - 6:36
8. "Bone Brother" (Cleveland, Jones) - 5:38
9. "I Hadn't Anyone Till You" (Ray Noble) - 4:15
10. "See Minor" (Cleveland) - 5:15

== Personnel ==
- Jimmy Cleveland - trombone
- Ernie Royal - trumpet
- Lucky Thompson, (tracks 1–8), Jerome Richardson (tracks 9 & 10) - tenor saxophone
- Cecil Payne - baritone saxophone
- Hank Jones (tracks 3, 4 & 6–8), Wade Legge (tracks 9 & 10), John Williams (tracks 1, 2 & 5) - piano
- Barry Galbraith - guitar
- Paul Chambers (tracks 1, 2, 5, 9 & 10), Oscar Pettiford (tracks 3, 4 & 6–8) - bass
- Joe Harris (tracks 9 & 10), Osie Johnson (tracks 3, 4 & 6–8), Max Roach (tracks 1, 2 & 5) - drums
- Quincy Jones - arranger, conductor
