= Julian Euell =

American jazz bassist (1929–2019)

Julian Euell (May 23, 1929 – June 3, 2019) was an American jazz bassist.

Euell first began playing bass in 1944, and served in the Army from 1945 to 1947. He played with Sonny Rollins, Jackie McLean, and Art Taylor in 1947 but quit music from 1949 to 1952, working in a post office. In 1952 he studied under Charles Mingus and then attended Juilliard from 1953 to 1956, studying with Stuart Sankey, and Frederick Zimmermann. He also took classes at New York University between 1951 and 1954, and received a bachelor's in sociology from Columbia University; In 1954-55 he taught there. His musical associations at the time included Elmo Hope (1952), Benny Harris (1952–53), Charlie Rouse (1953–54), Joe Roland (1955), Freddie Redd (1956), Gigi Gryce (1956–57), and Phineas Newborn (1957). After this he began doing social work in New Jersey and was less active as a performer, though he continued playing with Mal Waldron (1958–60), Randy Weston (1959), Abbey Lincoln (1959–60), Charles Mingus, and Kenny Dorham.

In the 1960s Euell worked in Harlem directing an arts program (1962–66) and then returned to school, receiving a Ph.D. from George Washington University in 1973. He was Assistant Secretary for Public Service at the Smithsonian from 1970 to 1982, and was partly responsible for the institution's increasing interest in jazz history. From 1983 to 1988 he directed the Oakland Museum History-Arts-Science and from 1991 to 1995 was director of the Louis Armstrong House. He returned to semiregular performing in the 1980s and 1990s.

== Discography ==
=== As sideman ===
With John Coltrane

- Cattin' with Coltrane and Quinichette (Prestige, 1957)

With Gigi Gryce

- The Hap'nin's (New Jazz, 1960)
- The Rat Race Blues (New Jazz, 1960)
- Reminiscin' (Mercury, 1960)
- Doin' the Gigi (Uptown, 2011)

With John Handy

- Jazz (Roulette, 1962)

With Little Brother Montgomery

- Tasty Blues (Bluesville, 1961)

With Mal Waldron

- Mal-1 (Prestige, 1956)
- Mal/2 (Prestige, 1957)
- Mal/3: Sounds (Prestige, 1958)
- Left Alone (Bethlehem, 1959)
