= New Formulas from the Jazz Lab =

Studio album by Gigi Gryce & Donald Byrd
- Released: 1982
- Recorded: July 30–31 and August 1, 1957; New York City
- Genre: Jazz
- Label: RCA; PL 43698

Gigi Gryce chronology
At Newport (1957)	New Formulas from the Jazz Lab (1982)	Jazz Lab (1958)

New Formulas from the Jazz Lab is an album by American jazz saxophonist Gigi Gryce and trumpeter Donald Byrd featuring tracks recorded in 1957 but not released until 1982 on the French RCA label.

== Reception ==
Professional ratings
Review scores
Source	Rating
Allmusic	3/5 stars

Allmusic awarded the album 3 stars stating "Altoist Gigi Gryce and trumpeter Donald Byrd were not able to keep their colorful hard bop quintet together for long, but in 1957, they did record 5 worthy albums... The overall results give fresh life to 1950s straight-ahead jazz, although the short life of this group kept it from ever being influential".

== Track listing ==
All compositions by Gigi Gryce except as indicated

1. "Exhibit A" - 8:30
2. "Capri" - 4:53
3. "Splittin'" (Ray Bryant) - 5:15
4. "Ergo the Blues (Hank Jones) - 6:20
5. "Passade" (Jones) - 6:25
6. "Byrd in Hand" (Barry Harris) - 9:35
7. "Ergo the Blues" [alternate take] (Jones) - 7:42 - Does not appear on CD SICJ-26

== Personnel ==
- Gigi Gryce - alto saxophone
- Donald Byrd - trumpet
- Hank Jones - piano
- Paul Chambers - bass
- Art Taylor - drums
