= Sentiments (album) =

Studio album by Sahib Shihab
- Released: 1972
- Recorded: March 1971; Copenhagen, Denmark
- Genre: Jazz
- Length: 36:04
- Label: Storyville; SLP 1008

Sahib Shihab chronology
| Companionship (1964-70) | Sentiments (1972) | La Marche dans le Désert (1972) |

Sentiments is an album by American jazz saxophonist/flautist Sahib Shihab recorded in 1971 and released on the Danish Storyville label.

== Reception ==
Professional ratings
Review scores
| Source | Rating |
|---|---|
| AllMusic | 4.5/5 stars |

The AllMusic review by Ken Dryden states "Most of the compositions are by the leader, starting with the exotic blend of hard bop and African rhythm, featuring Shihab's dancing soprano sax and Pedersen's bass solo. Drew switches to organ and Pedersen makes a relatively rare appearance on electric bass on the funky 'Sentiments.' The leader switches to baritone sax for Drew's exuberant ballad 'Extase.'"

== Track listing ==
All compositions by Sahib Shihab except where noted.

1. "Ma'nee" – 7:45
2. "The Call" – 7:55
3. "Rue de la Harpe" – 5:00
4. "Sentiments" – 4:37
5. "From Me to You" – 3:40
6. "Extase" (Kenny Drew) – 4:33
7. "Companionship" (Shihab, Niels-Henning Ørsted Pedersen) – 4:10

== Personnel ==
- Sahib Shihab – soprano saxophone, baritone saxophone, alto flute
- Kenny Drew – piano, organ
- Niels-Henning Ørsted Pedersen – bass, electric bass
- Jimmy Hopps – drums
