= The Hap'nin's =

Studio album by Gigi Gryce
- Released: 1960
- Recorded: May 3, 1960
- Studio: Van Gelder Studio, Englewood Cliffs, New Jersey
- Genre: Jazz
- Length: 39:34
- Label: New Jazz; NJLP 8246
- Producer: Esmond Edwards

Gigi Gryce chronology
Saying Somethin'! (1960)	The Hap'nin's (1960)	The Rat Race Blues (1960)

The Hap'nin's is an album by American saxophonist Gigi Gryce recorded in 1960 for the New Jazz label.

== Reception ==
Professional ratings
Review scores
Source	Rating
AllMusic	4/5 stars
The Penguin Guide to Jazz Recordings	3/4 stars

AllMusic reviewer Scott Yanow awarded the album 4 stars stating "The hard bop set has its strong moments even this group was largely forgotten after Gryce's retirement. Worth investigating."

== Track listing ==
All compositions by Gigi Gryce except as indicated

1. "Frankie and Johnny" (Traditional) – 7:33
2. "Lover Man" (Jimmy Davis, Ram Ramirez, James Sherman) – 5:36
3. "Minority" – 6:32
4. "Summertime" (George Gershwin, Ira Gershwin, DuBose Heyward) – 8:03
5. "Nica’s Tempo" – 4:04
6. "Don't Worry 'bout Me" (Rube Bloom, Ted Koehler) – 7:42

== Personnel ==
- Gigi Gryce – alto saxophone
- Richard Williams – trumpet
- Richard Wyands – piano
- Julian Euell – bass
- Mickey Roker – drums
