= When Farmer Met Gryce =

Studio album by Art Farmer and Gigi Gryce
- Released: 1955
- Recorded: May 19, 1954; May 26, 1955
- Studio: Van Gelder Studio, Hackensack, New Jersey
- Genre: Jazz
- Length: 41:46
- Label: Prestige; P 7085
- Producer: Bob Weinstock

Art Farmer chronology
Early Art (1954)	When Farmer Met Gryce (1955)	Art Farmer Quintet featuring Gigi Gryce (1955)

Gigi Gryce chronology
When Farmer Met Gryce (1954-55)	Nica's Tempo (1955)

Professional ratings
Review scores
Source	Rating
AllMusic	4/5 stars
The Rolling Stone Jazz Record Guide	3/5 stars
The Penguin Guide to Jazz Recordings	3.5/4 stars

When Farmer Met Gryce is an album by trumpeter Art Farmer and saxophonist Gigi Gryce, featuring performances recorded in 1954 and 1955 and released on the Prestige label.

== Reception ==
The AllMusic review stated: "all eight numbers will easily be enjoyed by straight-ahead jazz fans." The Penguin Guide to Jazz gave it a 3½-star review, expressing a slight preference for the co-leaders' later album, Art Farmer Quintet featuring Gigi Gryce.

== Track listing ==
All compositions by Gigi Gryce, except as indicated

1. "A Night at Tony's" – 5:06
2. "Blue Concept" – 4:56
3. "Stupendous-Lee" – 5:47
4. "Deltitnu" – 4:18
5. "Social Call" – 6:04
6. "Capri" – 5:01
7. "Blue Lights" – 5:19
8. "The Infant's Song" (Farmer) – 5:15
- Recorded at Van Gelder Studio in Hackensack, New Jersey on May 19, 1954 (tracks 1–4) and May 26, 1955 (tracks 5–8)

== Personnel ==
- Art Farmer – trumpet
- Gigi Gryce – alto saxophone
- Horace Silver (tracks 1–4), Freddie Redd (tracks 5–8) – piano
- Percy Heath (tracks 1–4), Addison Farmer (tracks 5–8) – bass
- Kenny Clarke (tracks 1–4), Art Taylor (tracks 5–8) – drums
