= Reminiscin' =

Studio album by Gigi Gryce Orch-Tette
- Released: 1960
- Recorded: November 7, 9 & 10, 1960; New York City
- Genre: Jazz
- Label: Mercury; MG 20628

Gigi Gryce chronology
The Rat Race Blues (1960)	Reminiscin' (1960)	Doin' the Gigi (1957-61)

Reminiscin' is an album by saxophonist Gigi Gryce recorded in 1960 for the Mercury label.

== Reception ==
Professional ratings
Review scores
Source	Rating
AllMusic	3/5 stars
DownBeat	4/5 stars

The contemporaneous DownBeat reviewer, Ira Gitler, concluded: "Gryce has achieved a balance between the blowing and arranged sections. The latter set off the former, investing the soloists' spots with greater interest and making the album a success". AllMusic reviewer Ron Wynn awarded the album 3 stars stating: "This is alternately reflective, dashing, and sentimental."

== Track listing ==
All compositions by Gigi Gryce except as indicated

1. "Blue Lights" – 3:25
2. "Caravan" (Duke Ellington, Juan Tizol, Irving Mills) – 4:26
3. "Reminiscing" – 4:01
4. "Yesterdays" (Jerome Kern, Otto Harbach) – 4:46
5. "Gee Blues Gee" (Randy Weston) – 3:22
6. "A Night in Tunisia" (Dizzy Gillespie, Frank Paparelli) – 5:12
7. "Dearly Beloved" (Jerome Kern, Johnny Mercer) – 4:20
8. "Take the "A" Train" (Billy Strayhorn) – 3:36
- Recorded in New York City on November 7 (track 6), November 9 (tracks 1, 5 & 7) and November 10 (tracks 2–4 & 8), 1960

== Personnel ==
- Gigi Gryce – alto saxophone
- Richard Williams – trumpet
- Eddie Costa – vibraphone (tracks 2–4, 6 & 8)
- Richard Wyands – piano
- George Duvivier (tracks 2–4 & 8), Julian Euell (tracks 1, 5 & 7), Reggie Workman (track 6) – bass
- Walter Perkins (tracks 1, 5 & 7), Bobby Thomas (tracks 2–4, 6 & 8) – drums
