= Jazz Lab =

Studio album by Donald Byrd and Gigi Gryce
- Released: 1958
- Recorded: February 4–5 & March 13, 1957; New York City
- Genre: Jazz
- Label: Columbia; CL 998

Gigi Gryce chronology
Nica's Tempo (1955)	Jazz Lab (1958)	Gigi Gryce and the Jazz Lab Quintet (1957)

Donald Byrd chronology
Three Trumpets (1957)	Jazz Lab (1958)	At Newport (1957)

Jazz Lab is a studio album by American jazz trumpeter Donald Byrd and saxophonist Gigi Gryce, released by Columbia Records in 1957.

== Reception ==
Professional ratings
Review scores
Source	Rating
AllMusic	4.5/5 stars

AllMusic awarded the album 4½ stars, stating, "With some of the best arrangements heard in jazz and excellent solos by Gryce, Byrd, and Flanagan, Jazz Lab makes for an excellent introduction to the hard bop catalog."

== Track listing ==
All tracks are by Gigi Gryce except where noted.

1. "Speculation" (Horace Silver) – 3:38
2. "Over the Rainbow" (Harold Arlen, Yip Harburg) – 8:21
3. "Nica's Tempo" – 5:27
4. "Blue Concept" – 5:03
5. "Little Niles" (Randy Weston) – 7:04
6. "Sans Souci" – 7:17
7. "I Remember Clifford" (Benny Golson) – 4:57
- Recorded in New York City on February 4, 1957 (tracks 1 & 3), February 5, 1957 (tracks 2 & 6), and March 13, 1957 (tracks 4, 5 & 7)

== Personnel ==
- Gigi Gryce – alto saxophone
- Donald Byrd – trumpet
- Jimmy Cleveland (tracks 5 & 7), Benny Powell (tracks 1 & 3) – trombone
- Julius Watkins – French horn (tracks 1, 3, 5 & 7)
- Don Butterfield – tuba (tracks 1, 3, 5 & 7)
- Sahib Shihab – baritone saxophone (tracks 1, 3, 5 & 7)
- Tommy Flanagan (tracks 1–3 & 6), Wade Legge (tracks 4, 5 & 7) – piano
- Wendell Marshall – bass
- Art Taylor – drums
