= Monk Montgomery =

American jazz bassist (1921–1982)

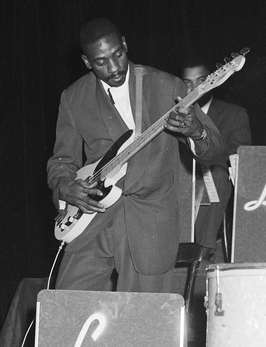
- Montgomery in Norway, 1953

Background information
- Born: William Howard Montgomery; October 10, 1921; Indianapolis, Indiana, United States
- Died: May 20, 1982 (aged 60) Las Vegas, Nevada
- Genres: Jazz
- Occupation: Musician
- Instruments: Bass guitar, double bass
- Years active: 1950s–1970s
- Labels: Chisa, Philadelphia International

William Howard "Monk" Montgomery (October 10, 1921 – May 20, 1982) was an American jazz bassist. He was a pioneer of the electric bass guitar and possibly the first to be recorded playing the instrument when he participated in a 1953 session released on The Art Farmer Septet. He was the brother of jazz guitarist Wes Montgomery and vibraphonist Buddy Montgomery.

== Biography ==
Born in Indianapolis, Indiana, United States, into a musical family, Monk had three brothers and a sister. His older brother Thomas played drums, and died at 16. Monk gave his younger brother Wes (1923–68) a tenor guitar when Wes was 11 or 12. The youngest brother, Buddy (1930–2009) played piano and later took up the vibraphone. Their younger sister, Ervena (Lena), also played piano. Monk himself did not take up the double bass until he was 30, after hearing one of Wes' groups perform.

The three brothers released a number of albums together as the Montgomery Brothers, also playing together on some albums credited to Wes. In addition, Buddy and Monk recorded many albums together in their group The Mastersounds.

Montgomery is perhaps the first electric bassist of significance to jazz, taking up the Fender Precision Bass in 1952 or ‘53, after replacing Roy Johnson in the Lionel Hampton Orchestra. He said his biggest influences as a bassist were Jimmy Blanton, Ray Brown, and Charles Mingus. Monk played electric bass with his thumb (brother Wes similarly played electric guitar with his thumb) and adapted his jazz playing from double bass to electric. In the 1960s, he took up Fender Jazz Bass, playing with a felt pick.

His professional career did not start until he was 30, and after that of his younger brother Wes. Montgomery worked in a foundry and played gigs on upright bass at night in Indianapolis. Wes worked for vibraphonist Lionel Hampton from 1948 to 1950, Monk then worked for Hampton around 1952–1953, with Hampton insisting he play the Fender bass, and not an upright. Montgomery's recordings with The Art Farmer Septet on 2 July 1953, arranged by Quincy Jones, are possibly the earliest studio recordings of the electric bass, and display his facility with walking bass lines, bebop melodies, and Latin-style ostinato. Chuck Rainey said that Monk was the first electric bassist to record, in any genre. A live recording of Montgomery with the Hampton orchestra from April 1953 may exist.

Guys in other kinds of music may have beat me to the studio, though I'm not aware of any ... As far as I know, I was the first in jazz to record electric bass.

— Monk Montgomery, Guitar Player, September 1977, reprinted in The Guitar Player Book, 1979, and in Bass Heroes, 1993

Monk toured and recorded in Europe with Hampton in late 1953. After that he worked briefly with the Anthony Ortega Quartet in Los Angeles, and then with his brothers in the Montgomery-Johnson Quintet in Indianapolis (with Alonzo "Pookie" Johnson, sax, and Robert "Sonny" Johnson, drums). In 1955, Montgomery moved to Seattle to form The Mastersounds from 1957 to 1960. The Montgomery Brothers reformed, and made a series of albums in 1961.

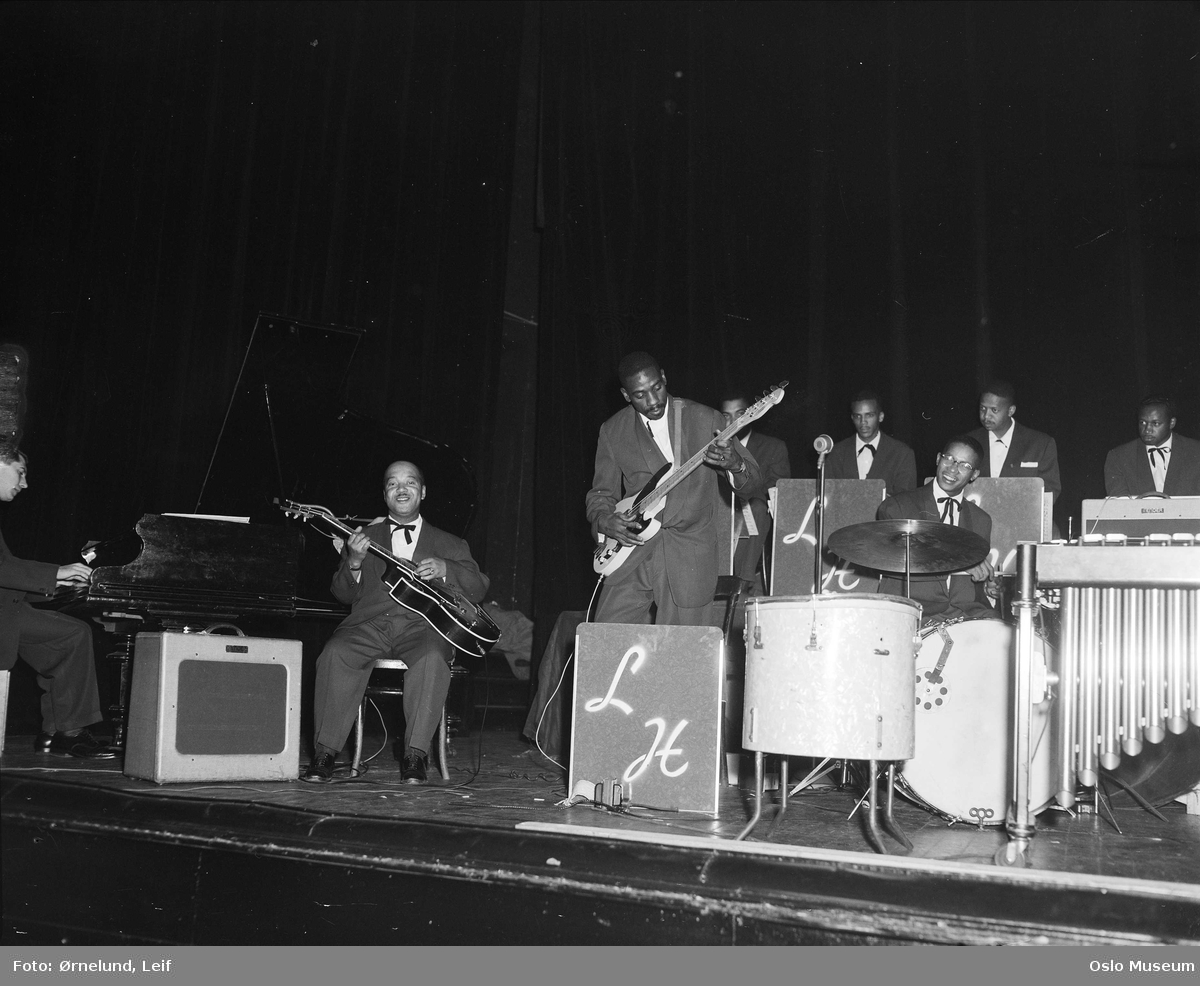
Montgomery with Lionel Hampton and his Orchestra, Oslo, Norway, 1953

In 1964 and 1965, Montgomery performed on two albums by The Jazz Crusaders, and members of that band went on to produce and play on his first two solo albums. Later, from 1966 to 1970, he freelanced with vibraphonist Cal Tjader and continued to play where he settled in Las Vegas, Nevada, with the Red Norvo Trio until 1972. Between 1969 and 1974, Montgomery released four solo albums.

In 1970, he recorded in Los Angeles with South African trumpeter Hugh Masekela. In 1974, Montgomery toured South Africa with a group including singer Lovelace Watkins, and Montgomery recorded his final solo album Monk Montgomery in Africa...Live! in Soweto. In 1976, he served on the Jazz Advisory Panel for the National Endowment for the Arts with Benny Carter, George Russell, Muhal Richard Abrams, and others. In 1977, he helped organize the inaugural Maseru Music Festival in Lesotho, which featured Dizzy Gillespie, plus students and staff from Rutgers University and local musicians. In his final years, Montgomery was active in the Las Vegas Jazz Society, which he founded, and he presented a local radio show. He had also been planning a world jazz festival. In 1981, he became the founding president of the Western Federation for Jazz.

Montgomery died of cancer in Las Vegas on May 20, 1982. He had a wife, Amelia, three sons, and four stepchildren.

In 2003, on his self-titled album, Detroit musician Andrés sampled Montgomery's track "Reality".

== Discography ==
- It's Never Too Late (Chisa, 1969)
- Bass Odyssey (Chisa, 1971)
- Reality (Philadelphia International, 1974)
- Monk Montgomery in Africa...Live! (Philadelphia International, 1975)

With The Montgomery Brothers

- 1955: Almost Forgotten (Columbia)
- 1957: The Montgomery Brothers and Five Others (Pacific Jazz)
- 1961: Groove Yard (Riverside)
- 1961: The Montgomery Brothers (Fantasy)
- 1961: The Montgomery Brothers in Canada (Fantasy)
- 1961: Love Walked In (Jazzland)
- 1961: Wes, Buddy and Monk Montgomery (Pacific Jazz)
- 1961: George Shearing and the Montgomery Brothers (Jazzland)

With The Mastersounds

- Jazz Showcase (World Pacific, 1957)
- The King and I (World Pacific, 1957)
- Kismet (World Pacific, 1958)
- Flower Drum Song (World Pacific, 1958)
- Ballads & Blues (World Pacific, 1959)
- The Mastersounds in Concert (World Pacific, 1959)
- Happy Holidays from Many Lands (World Pacific, 1959)
- The Mastersounds Play Horace Silver (World Pacific, 1960)
- Swinging with the Mastersounds (Fantasy, 1961)
- The Mastersounds on Tour (Fantasy, 1961)
- A Date with The Mastersounds (Fantasy, 1961)

With Buddy Montgomery

- The Two-Sided Album (Milestone, 1968)
- This Rather Than That (Impulse!, 1969)

With Wes Montgomery

- Far Wes (Pacific Jazz, 1958)
- Complete Live at Jorgies (Definitive, 2002), recorded 1961, six tracks with Buddy and Monk
- Echoes of Indiana Avenue (Resonance, 2012), recorded 1958–59, one track with Buddy and Monk

=== As sideman ===
- Kenny Burrell – Ellington Is Forever Volume Two (Fantasy, 1975)
- Jerry Coker – Modern Music from Indiana University (Fantasy, 1956)
- Art Farmer – The Art Farmer Septet (Prestige, 1954)
- Johnny Griffin – Do Nothing 'til You Hear from Me (Riverside, 1963)
- Lionel Hampton – four dates issued under various titles:
  - Stockholm, Sweden, 14 September 1953, European Concert 1953 (IAJRC)
  - Basel, Switzerland, 25 September 1953, European Tour 1953 (Royal Jazz)
  - Paris, France, 28 September 1953, The Complete Paris Session 1953 (Vogue)
  - Berlin, Germany, 4 October 1953
- Eddie Harris – Silver Cycles (Atlantic, 1968)
- Hampton Hawes – The Green Leaves of Summer (Contemporary, 1964)
- Jon Hendricks – A Good Git-Together (World Pacific, 1959)
- The Jazz Crusaders – Stretchin' Out (Pacific Jazz, 1964)
- The Jazz Crusaders – The Thing (Pacific Jazz, 1965)
- The Jazz Crusaders – The Pacific Jazz Quintet Studio Sessions (Mosaic, 2005)
- Perri Lee - At the Parisian Room (Dot, 1966)
- Hugh Masekela – Reconstruction (Chisa, 1970)
- Jack Wilson – Ramblin' (Vault, 1966)

== Bibliography ==
- Monk Montgomery – The Monk Montgomery Electric Bass Method (Studio 224, 1978)

== See also ==
- List of jazz bassists
