= The Rat Race Blues =

Studio album by Gigi Gryce
- Released: 1960
- Recorded: June 7, 1960
- Studio: Van Gelder Studio, Englewood Cliffs, New Jersey
- Genre: Jazz
- Length: 40:11
- Label: New Jazz
- Producer: Esmond Edwards

Gigi Gryce chronology
| The Hap'nin's (1960) | The Rat Race Blues (1960) | Reminiscin' (1960) |

The Rat Race Blues is an album by American saxophonist Gigi Gryce recorded in 1960 for the New Jazz label.

== Reception ==
Professional ratings
Review scores
| Source | Rating |
|---|---|
| AllMusic | 4/5 stars |
| Down Beat | 4/5 stars |
| The Rolling Stone Jazz Record Guide | 4/5 stars |
| The Penguin Guide to Jazz Recordings | 3.5/4 stars |

Harvey Pekar, writing in his four star review in the August 10, 1962 issue of Down Beat stated: "Gryce's major contributions to jazz have been made as an outstanding composer-arranger. But his writing ability notwithstanding... this is primarily a blowing session." AllMusic reviewer Scott Yanow awarded the album 4 stars stating "The group swings its way through two of Gryce's lesser-known originals and three then-recent obscurities. Interesting and generally fresh straight-ahead jazz."

== Track listing ==
All compositions by Gigi Gryce except where noted

1. "The Rat Race Blues" – 6:35
2. "Strange Feelin'" (Sam Finch) – 7:45
3. "Boxer's Blues" – 6:58
4. "Blues in Bloom" (Norman Mapp) – 7:44
5. "Monday Through Sunday" (Mapp) – 11:09

== Personnel ==
- Gigi Gryce – alto saxophone
- Richard Williams – trumpet
- Richard Wyands – piano
- Julian Euell – bass
- Mickey Roker – drums
