= Clifford Solomon =

American jazz musician

Clifford "King" Solomon (January 17, 1931 – June 21, 2004) was an American jazz and R&B musician.

Solomon was born in Los Angeles and learned to play clarinet from an early age and picked up saxophone when he was 13. In the late 1940s he played with T-Bone Walker and Pee Wee Crayton, then joined the band of Roy Porter in 1948-1949, and soon after played with Lionel Hampton, Floyd Ray, Art Farmer, Annie Ross, Gigi Gryce, Clifford Brown, Charles Brown, and then Hampton again. He led his own band in Alaska in the mid-1950s and played with Roy Milton in 1956-57; he also recorded under his own name for Okeh Records in the 1950s. He worked in the 1960s with Onzy Matthews (1962-1964), Ike & Tina Turner as a member of the Kings of Rhythm, and Johnny Otis. In addition he recorded with Lou Rawls, Preston Love, Mel Brown, Maxine Weldon, Billy Brooks, Esther Phillips, John Mayall, and Big Joe Turner. From February to March 1974, he was the saxophonist in the two-piece "horn band" of Canned Heat's European tour; the author of this reference characterizes Clifford Solomon as "one of the best musicians I have ever played with". From 1974 to 1987 he was Ray Charles's musical director; he served in the same capacity for Johnny Otis from 1988 to 1990. In the 1990s he worked with Charles Brown once more.

== Bibliography ==
- Howard Rye, "Clifford Solomon". The New Grove Dictionary of Jazz. 2nd edition, ed. Barry Kernfeld, 2004.
