= Nica's Tempo =

Studio album by Gigi Gryce
- Released: 1955
- Recorded: October 15 & 22, 1955
- Studio: Van Gelder Studio; Hackensack, New Jersey
- Genre: Jazz
- Label: Savoy (originally issued on Signal Records)

Gigi Gryce chronology
| When Farmer Met Gryce (1955) | Nica's Tempo (1955) | Jazz Lab (1957) |

Earlier covers
- First edition by Harold Feinstein

- Second edition, also by Feinstein

Professional ratings
Review scores
| Source | Rating |
|---|---|
| AllMusic | 4/5 stars |
| DownBeat | 3/5 stars |

Nica's Tempo is the most common latter-day title of an album by the Gigi Gryce Orchestra and Quartet, recorded and first released in late 1955.

== Background ==
=== Recording and composition ===
While side two is ostensibly by the "Gigi Gryce Quartet", its duration is dominated by three previously unrecorded compositions of Thelonious Monk, on which he is featured as the quartet's pianist. Furthermore, the lineup is Gryce plus the same musicians that had recorded a 10" LP as the Thelonious Monk Trio a year earlier (Thelonious Monk Plays), making this arguably a Monk/Gryce quartet, playing under Gryce's name for contractual reasons. Author Robin D.G.Kelley, in the book Thelonious Monk: The Life and Times of an American Original, reports that the teaching, rehearsal and performance of these compositions were all directed by Monk. Kelley further describes:

[Bill] Grauer and [Orrin] Keepnews were not happy that Monk had just recorded and published three original songs--songs that they felt should have been released on the Riverside label. Legally, there was nothing they could do; Monk did not break his contract by recording as a sideman.

It would be another year before Riverside Records recorded any original Monk compositions, for the album Brilliant Corners. These were, therefore, the only original compositions Monk recorded for release in 1955.

=== Release history ===
The album was originally issued in late 1955 (Signal S 1201) in packaging that makes its title difficult to summarize. The side A label read Gigi Gryce Orchestra, while the side B label read Gigi Gryce Quartet; the back cover listed both titles. One Signal edition of the front cover simply read Gigi Gryce, while the other was titled with a list of 11 star players from the sessions, starting with Gigi Gryce and Thelonious Monk. The Signal Records masters were acquired by Savoy Records, who reissued this album circa 1958 as Nica's Tempo.

=== Title ===
The title track is a reference to Nica de Koenigswarter (born Kathleen Annie Pannonica Rothschild) a.k.a. "The Bebop Baroness" or "The Jazz Baroness", a patron of jazz musicians such as Thelonious Monk and Charlie Parker.

== Track listing ==
=== Side 1 (by "Gigi Gryce Orchestra") ===
1. "Speculation" (Horace Silver) – 4:03
2. "In a Meditating Mood" (Gigi Gryce) – 4:22
3. "Social Call" (Gryce, Jon Hendricks) – 2:43
4. "Smoke Signal" (Gryce) – 3:42
5. "(You'll Always Be) The One I Love" (Gryce) – 3:28
6. "Kerry Dance" (traditional) – 3:00

=== Side 2 (by "Gigi Gryce Quartet") ===
7. "Shuffle Boil" (Thelonious Monk) – 4:59
8. "Brake's Sake" (Thelonious Monk) – 4:45
9. "Gallop's Gallop" (Thelonious Monk) – 5:25
10. "Nica's Tempo" (Gryce) – 6:06

== Personnel ==
=== Gigi Gryce Orchestra ===
Tracks 1, 2, 4, 6: Rudy Van Gelder Studio, Hackensack, New Jersey, October 22, 1955

- Art Farmer – trumpet
- Jimmy Cleveland – trombone
- Gunther Schuller – French horn
- Bill Barber – tuba
- Gigi Gryce – alto saxophone
- Danny Bank – baritone saxophone
- Horace Silver – piano
- Oscar Pettiford – bass
- Kenny Clarke – drums

Tracks 3, 5: Rudy Van Gelder Studio, Hackensack, New Jersey, October 22, 1955

- Art Farmer – trumpet
- Eddie Bert – trombone
- Julius Watkins – French horn
- Bill Barber – tuba
- Gigi Gryce – alto saxophone
- Cecil Payne – baritone saxophone
- Horace Silver – piano
- Oscar Pettiford – bass
- Art Blakey – drums
- Ernestine Anderson – vocals

=== Gigi Gryce Quartet ===
Tracks 7–10: Rudy Van Gelder Studio, Hackensack, New Jersey, October 15, 1955

- Gigi Gryce – alto saxophone
- Thelonious Monk – piano
- Percy Heath – bass
- Art Blakey – drums

=== Technical personnel ===
- Ozzie Cadena – producer
- Rudy Van Gelder – recording engineer
- Ira Gitler – liner notes
