= Gigi Gryce =

American jazz musician, composer, arranger, and educator (1925–1983)

- Gigi Gryce

Background information
- Also known as: Basheer Quisim
- Born: George General Grice Jr. November 28, 1925; Pensacola, Florida, U.S.
- Died: March 14, 1983 (aged 57) Pensacola, Florida
- Genres: Jazz
- Occupations: Musician, arranger, composer, educator
- Instruments: Alto saxophone, flute
- Website: www.gigigryce.com

Gigi Gryce (born George General Grice Jr.; November 28, 1925 – March 17, 1983), later in life changing his name to Basheer Qusim, was an American jazz saxophonist, flautist, clarinetist, composer, arranger, and educator.

While his performing career was relatively short, much of his work as a player, composer, and arranger was quite influential and well-recognized during his time. However, Gryce abruptly ended his jazz career in the 1960s. This, in addition to his nature as a private person, has resulted in little knowledge of Gryce today. Several of his compositions have been covered extensively ("Minority", "Social Call", "Nica's Tempo") and have become minor jazz standards. Gryce's compositional bent includes harmonic choices similar to those of contemporaries Benny Golson, Tadd Dameron and Horace Silver. Gryce's playing, arranging, and composing are most associated with the classic hard bop era (roughly 1953–1965). He was a well-educated composer and musician, and wrote some classical works as a student at the Boston Conservatory. As a jazz musician and composer he was influenced by the work of Charlie Parker and Thelonious Monk.

== Early life ==
George General Gryce Jr. was born in Pensacola, Florida on November 28, 1925.

Gryce spent most of his early life in Hartford, Connecticut. His family's strong emphasis on music, manners, and discipline had a tremendous effect on him as a child and into his later career. Gryce's parents were of modest means: his father owned a small cleaning and pressing service, and his mother, Rebecca Rials, was a seamstress who also helped her husband run the business. The family belonged to the African Methodist Episcopal Church and attended services diligently. Especially as the Great Depression began to take its toll on the family's financial welfare, the Gryces did their best to instill the value of discipline and hard work in their children.

Music was much emphasized in the Gryce household. The family had a piano, which Gigi and his siblings (four older sisters and one younger brother) were encouraged to play. Mostly church music was performed in the Gryce home, while pop and jazz was mostly frowned upon. (Later, however, when Gigi pursued jazz as a career, his mother and older sisters would support him personally and financially.) Many of the Gryce children were encouraged to pursue vocal performance at church, school, and other community; for a time the family even held weekly recitals in their home.

The early 1930s saw tragedy and hardship for the Gryce family. In 1931, as the economic crisis of The Great Depression began to take hold, the Gryces were forced to sell their cleaning business. Two years later, Gigi's father, George Sr., died after suffering a heart attack. Rebecca Gryce was forced to raise the children as a single mother, relocating the family in order to rent out the house. Even through this hardship, however, Rebecca continued to motivate her children for success through strict but supportive parenting, encouraging musical development, hard work, discipline, and Christian morals.

Gigi applied his family's sense of discipline to his developing passion for music. As a youth Gigi was described as bright but reserved, extremely polite, studious, and formal in nature. It is unclear exactly when Gigi first began learning the clarinet – it is rumored he may have started as early as age 9 or 10, but the first evidence for his pursuit appears later as he entered high school. The under-resourced, and at this time, mostly black Booker T. Washington High School had a series of music teachers through the Federal Music Project; Gigi first studied with Joseph Jessie and later Raymond Shepard. As it was for many, a musical instrument would have been a crippling expense for the Gryces during the Depression; when Gigi and his brother Tommy studied clarinet with Shepard they allegedly borrowed the same clarinet from a friend directly before each lesson. Eventually, Gigi's mother was able to buy him his own Cavalier metal clarinet, with which Gigi became quite successful as a high school student, winning school and state competitions. At school Gigi was also able to study music theory, which he enjoyed and continued to explore on the piano at home.

== Early music career ==
Gryce graduated from high school in 1943, working at the shipyard and playing in Raymond Shepard's professional band for a time before being drafted by the navy in March 1944. Gryce continued to pursue music during his two-year term, making his way into the navy band and earning the rank of musician second class. While stationed in Great Lakes, Illinois, Gryce spent time in Chicago during leaves and became more acquainted with the sound of bebop. It was at this time that he bought his own alto saxophone and, in Chicago, that he met musicians Andrew "Goon" Gardner and Harry Curtis. Gryce may have even briefly studied at the Chicago Conservatory of Music.

After completing his time in the navy, Gryce decided to continue his musical education, financially supported by the G.I. Bill as well as his mother and older sisters. He moved to Hartford to live with his sister Harriet and her husband in 1946, and the following year enrolled at the Boston Conservatory. At the Boston Conservatory Gryce developed his theoretical background and studied classical composition, writing three symphonies and a ballet in addition to other works. He was inspired and influenced by the work and philosophy of Boston Conservatory composer Alan Hovhaness, a musical eclectic whose passion was for melodicism and lyricism.

During his time at the conservatory Gryce also developed connections in the Hartford, Boston, and New York jazz scenes which would have a tremendous effect on his later career as a jazz musician, composer, and arranger. While New York was best known for cutting edge jazz of the time, both Boston and Hartford were also the sites of active and innovative jazz scenes. Gryce traveled between the two cities, and arranged for local bands including those of Sabby Lewis, Phil Edmonds, and Bunky Emerson. While Gryce developed his theoretical background and a passion for the works of Bartok and Stravinsky, he simultaneously developed an obsession for the work of Charlie Parker and Thelonious Monk, with whom, around 1949, he became acquainted and also performed. Gryce developed a reputation as a well-trained and talented artist, and became relatively well known in the local Boston and Hartford scenes. He also began to explore the New York scene, where he would eventually find himself in the early fifties.

Gryce is rumored to have traveled to Paris on a Fulbright scholarship in 1951 to study with Nadia Boulanger and Arthur Honegger. However, there is much confusion and rumor surrounding this period in Gryce's life, and there is no evidence to suggest that Gryce did receive a Fulbright or formally study with the two composers. Gryce did take two semesters off to study in Europe, but little is known about his travels. It is possible that he studied with the composers privately. While Gryce did propagate the Fulbright rumor himself to substantiate his credentials, Gryce had little else to say about this time in his life.

== New York, the Lionel Hampton Band, and Europe ==
After graduating with a degree in composition in 1952, Gryce relocated to New York City, where he would enjoy much success in the mid fifties. In 1953 Max Roach recorded one of Gryce's charts with his septet, and soon after Gryce recorded with Howard McGhee and wrote for Horace Silver's sextet as well.

Gryce was influenced by Tadd Dameron, with whom he played in 1953 at the Paradise Club. Gryce had not yet reached his peak as a musician or soloist, but was developing a reputation as a versatile and talented composer and arranger. Later in 1953 Gryce also contributed a tune, "Up in Quincy's Place" to Art Farmer's Prestige recordings. While this recording was rather inconsequential, Farmer would become one of Gryce's closest colleagues.

One of the most important connections Gryce made in New York was with Quincy Jones, who encouraged Lionel Hampton to hire Gryce for his band in the summer of 1953. After playing with Hampton's band in the States, Gryce was invited to join the band for their European tour.

While the style of the Hampton band was outdated and overly commercialized in Gryce's eyes, the opportunities and connections made on the European tour were largely what propelled Gryce into success as an artist. In Hampton's band, Gryce played with Anthony Ortega, Clifford Solomon (tenor saxophone), Clifford Scott, Oscar Estelle (baritone saxophone), Walter Williams (trumpet), Art Farmer, Clifford Brown, Quincy Jones, Al Hayse, Jimmy Cleveland, George "Buster" Cooper, William "Monk" Montgomery, and Alan Dawson. Gryce became particularly close friends with Clifford Brown, with whom he found much in common. The Hampton tour did not pay well, and Gryce and others frequently sought recording opportunities on the side, particularly in Stockholm and Paris, where Europeans were eager to record touring Americans. There was already some tension in the band between young bebop-influenced musicians and the more established swing musicians (including Hampton himself), and Hampton did not react well when he heard his musicians were recording on the side.

The recordings Gryce made with Clifford Brown and others on the tour were often hurried and done on the fly, yet they were instrumental in building his career, particularly as a composer. Notable of these European recordings were "Paris the Beautiful", featuring tonal centers a third apart and a Parker-influenced solo by Gryce; "Brown Skins", a concerto for a large jazz ensemble; "Blue Concept", recorded by the Gryce-Brown sextet; and "Strictly Romantic", which oscillates between A flat and G major. In addition, Henri Renaud recorded an entire album exclusively of Gryce's work, which did a great deal to build his reputation.

== Career in the United States ==
Gryce and the other personnel from the Hampton Band returned to New York in November 1953, where the hard bop scene was just beginning to gain traction. This was the perfect time for Gryce to arrive on the scene. Soon after his return, he recorded with Henri Renaud, and Art Blakey recorded seven of Gryce's songs for EmArcy records. Gryce formed a quintet with Farmer in March 1954, which first recorded for Prestige Records in May of that year. Personnel included pianist Horace Silver, bassist Percy Heath, and drummer Kenny Clarke. Gryce's works with Farmer are some of his most influential and best known. In June of that year Gryce again recorded with Farmer, this time exclusively as composer and arranger. By the time Farmer and Gryce began their third project, they had hit their creative stride.

The record made in May 1955 by the Farmer-Gryce quintet featured pianist Freddie Redd, bassist Addison Farmer, and drummer Art Taylor. This session exemplifies Gryce's feel for thematic development, all of the pieces artfully composed and arranged. Later in 1955 Gryce also played for Oscar Pettiford's octet, and got the opportunity to play alto in Thelonious Monk's session with Percy Heath and Art Blakey for Signal Records (released as one side of Gryce's 1955 album, best known under the title Nica's Tempo) .

The final ticket to Gryce's success was his third recording with the Farmer Quintet in October 1955 and his nonet recordings for Signal Records immediately after. The Farmer record featured non-standard forms, and adventurous arrangements which pushed the limits of the hard bop idiom. His Signal Records arrangements were influenced by the style and instrumentation of Miles Davis's Birth of the Cool group, and were well received by the jazz community. By the mid-1950s Gryce was a major figure in jazz, known as a great individualist, a competent studio musician, and an innovative composer.

== Publishing career ==
In addition to his musical career, Gryce was a vehement advocate of composers' and musicians' rights. In 1955 he started his own publishing company, Melotone Music, and later an additional company called Totem. This was a time when black musicians in particularly were taken advantage of by the music industry. Many musicians neglected the business side of their careers or were actively cheated by record companies. As a composer Gryce always ensured that he got credit for his work, and actively encouraged his colleagues to do the same. Silver largely credits Gryce with inspiring him to found his Ecaroh Music company and the Silveto label. Little is known about Gryce's financial troubles in the early 1960s, but this hardship contributed to Gryce's breakdown and withdrawal from the jazz community.

== Later career ==
Gryce stayed on the cutting edge through 1956 until his career peaked in 1957. He worked on several projects as composer and arranger with the Teddy Charles Tentet and the Oscar Pettiford Orchestra. The Tentet began as an outgrowth of Charles Mingus's Jazz Composers Workshop, and was successful as a performing dance band despite its experimental nature. Gryce primarily served as sideman in Teddy Charles Tentet. His work with the Oscar Pettiford Orchestra was also well-recognized, producing significant coverage to the musicians who participated as well as to Gryce himself.

In 1957 Gryce and Donald Byrd collaborated on a series of projects with Jazz Lab, which produced play-along recordings as educational tools. Gryce's arrangements were fresh but accessible, tailored for educational purposes. The rhythm section played with a soloist to give the play-alongs a more natural feel. The group also performed, and gave a rather lukewarm performance at the Newport Jazz Festival.

The years 1957 to 1960 saw a series of miscellaneous projects for Gryce. He continued to play with the Jazz Lab, as well as writing for Betty Carter, Art Farmer, Jimmy Cleveland, Curtis Fuller, and Max Roach. He put together his own quintet, which he renamed the Orch-tette after adding vibraphonist Eddie Costa in 1960. His recordings with the Orch-tette had potential, but featured intricate arrangements which limited space for solos. Gryce worked on a handful of other projects in 1960, including a film score to On the Sound by Fred Baker and a final studio recording on Randy Weston's Uhuru Afrika. However, by this time Gryce was becoming preoccupied with business troubles associated with his publishing companies, as well as some family issues. Gryce's genre of hard bop was beginning to give way to more experimental strains. Around 1963, Gryce withdrew completely from his jazz career.

== Personal life ==
From childhood Gryce was always marked by a private and formal disposition. While he was liked by his colleagues, he was often an outsider in the community. Gryce also followed a strict moral lifestyle, abstaining from alcohol, drugs, and other vices common among his colleagues.

=== Family life ===
Gryce is known to have had other romantic relationships before his marriage to Eleanor Sears in 1953. Gryce had a brief relationship with Evelyn "Baby" Dubose in Pensacola during his Pensacola and Navy years, for whom he named his piece "Baby" which was recorded in Europe in 1953. He also had a casual relationship with vocalist Margie Anderson, with whom he worked during his time in Boston.

On December 20, 1953, soon after his return from the Lionel Hampton tour, he married Eleanor Sears, to whom he was introduced by trumpeter Idrees Sulieman. Their wedding was a simple event, held at a mosque in Brooklyn. The ceremony and the subsequent luncheon were attended by only Eleanor's sister, her husband, and a Muslim friend of Gryce's. They had four children: Bashir (born 1957); Bilil (born 1958, he was premature and did not survive infancy); Laila (born 1959); and Lynette (born 1963).

In 1972, Gigi Gryce, now known as Basheer Qusim, married Ollie Warren, a school secretary in the Bronx. Throughout their marriage until Gryce's death, his earlier music career took a back seat to his passionate dedication to education. Focused on teaching children, Gryce went above and beyond, aiming to bring out the best in his students, many of whom were at risk of failing. His innovative approach included using music to teach reading skills, aligning with research that shows music instruction improves reading and math skills for students in grade school.

=== Conversion to Islam ===
Gryce had always been described as having a strict moral sensibility. He may have been interested in Islam as early as 1950, and as a student became interested in religious history. At the Boston Conservatory in 1953 he named one of his symphonies "Gashiya" for a surah in the Qur'an. Gryce reveals little about who or what urged his conversion, but Islam was an increasingly popular faith among black jazz musicians in the fifties, particularly Ahmadiyya, Nation of Islam, and Sunni Islam. Gryce is believed to have converted during or shortly after his travels in Europe during his college years. While Gryce did not regularly attend the mosque, he did read the Qur'an and abstain from drugs, alcohol, and pork. His faith was a source of some tension in his marriage to Eleanor, who remained a practicing Christian. Many of Gryce's compositions had Islamic titles and his first two children were given Islam-inspired names.

== Withdrawal, teaching career, and death ==
Little is known about the real nature of Gryce's retreat from jazz, as this period is characterized by a great deal of misunderstanding and rumor. Gryce revealed little about his business hardships, but what is known is that his publishing business encountered financial troubles in the early 1960s, with many musicians withdrawing from Melotone and Totem. Many of his colleagues believe that powerful interests considered Gryce's publishing activities a threat, and were forcing him out of business. Rumors circulated about intimidation and threats to his family. While these rumors have not been confirmed, Gryce's behavior became extremely introverted and erratic during this time. He dissolved his publishing companies in 1963 and gave up his music career, thereafter adopting his Islamic name entirely, Basheer Qusim. Several of his compositions are credited to the pseudonym Lee Sears.

In the 1960s Gryce reinvented himself as a public school teacher in New York. He was somewhat interested in education throughout his life, and was said to be an excellent music instructor. He received a master's degree in education from Fordham University in 1978 and developed a passion for teaching. He left a lasting legacy at Elementary School No. 53 in the Bronx, which was renamed in his honor after his death. Students, colleagues, and parents who encountered Gryce during this time knew him as a private, serious, passionate, and caring man. Believing that music aided literacy, Gryce was a strict but caring teacher, and went out of his way to aid students at educational risk, working at an under-resourced mostly black and Hispanic school.

Gryce died on March 14, 1983, of a heart attack after becoming increasingly ill. His death was a shock to many of his former music career colleagues, as well as students, teachers, and parents of the students whom he had encountered over the years. Before his death, he reached out to his family again, and visited Pensacola for the first time in almost 30 years.

== Musical style, influences, and legacy ==
While in many ways his work exemplifies the conventions of the hard-bop era, Gryce always attempted to push the limits of common practice. As an educated composer with an extensive theoretical background, Gryce was prone to unconventional harmonization, form, and instrumentation as his style developed. In "Up in Quincy's Place", one of his early tunes, Gryce was rather ahead of his time in his frequent use of quartal harmony, a practice that would be popularized during the cool jazz era.

His compositions and arrangements with Farmer continued to feature non-standard forms and harmonies. His approach to hard bop trod the line between experimental and accessible, particularly in later work with the Teddy Charles Tentet and the Oscar Pettiford Orchestra. As an experimental composer, his goal was not jazz without limits, but forms which provided boundaries which liberated the soloist.

While Gryce was an accomplished saxophonist, clarinetist, and flautist, his playing tended to be less innovative than his writing. As a saxophonist, he was influenced by Charlie Parker, who he had always idolized and became friends with in the mid-1950. Contemporaries recall that Parker would sometimes borrow Gryce's horn.

More recently, Gryce's music has found a resurgence, specifically his composition "Social Call". Prominent recordings of this song (with lyric by Jon Hendricks) have been recorded by a new generation of jazz vocalists such as Jazzmeia Horn and Veronica Swift. The song is included on Samara Joy's Linger Awhile which won the 2023 Grammy Award for Best Jazz Vocal Album.

== Discography ==
=== As leader ===
- 1954–55: When Farmer Met Gryce with Art Farmer (Prestige, 1955)
- 1955: Nica's Tempo (Signal, 1955) – re-released on Savoy
- 1957: Jazz Lab with Donald Byrd (Columbia, 1958)
- 1957: Gigi Gryce and the Jazz Lab Quintet (Riverside, 1957)
- 1957: At Newport with Donald Byrd (Verve, 1958) – Live. One side of LP; other side is by Cecil Taylor.
- 1957: New Formulas from the Jazz Lab with Donald Byrd (RCA Victor, 1982)
- 1957: Jazz Lab with Donald Byrd (Jubilee, 1958)
- 1957: Modern Jazz Perspective with Donald Byrd (Columbia, 1957)
- 1958: Gigi Gryce (MetroJazz, 1960)
- 1960: Saying Somethin'! (New Jazz, 1960)
- 1960: The Hap'nin's (New Jazz, 1960)
- 1960: The Rat Race Blues (New Jazz, 1960)
- 1960: Reminiscin' (Mercury, 1960)

Compilation

- Doin' the Gigi (Uptown, 2011) – previously unissued tracks of 1957–61

=== As sideman and arranger ===
With Art Blakey

- Blakey (EmArcy, 1954)
- Mirage (Savoy, 1957) – arranger
- Theory of Art (RCA Victor, 1957) – arranger

With Clifford Brown

- New Star on the Horizon (sextet with Charlie Rouse) (Blue Note, 1953)[10"] – also included in Memorial Album (1956)
- Memorial Album (Blue Note, 1956)
- Memorial (Prestige, 1956) – rec. 1953
- The Clifford Brown Sextet in Paris (Prestige, 1970) – rec. 1953
- Clifford Brown in Paris (Complete Master Takes) (Prestige, 1971) – rec. 1953

With Betty Carter

- Out There (Peacock, 1958) – also rereleased as part of I Can't Help It (Impulse!/GRP, 1982)
- Social Call (Columbia, 1980) – rec. 1956

With Kenny Dorham

- Afro-Cuban (Blue Note, 1955) – arranger
- Jazz Contrasts (Riverside, 1957) – arranger

With Art Farmer

- The Art Farmer Septet (Prestige, 1954) – arranger
- Art Farmer Quintet featuring Gigi Gryce (Prestige, 1955) – also released as Evening In Casablanca (Prestige New Jazz, 1962)
- Modern Art (United Artists, 1958) – arranger

With Dizzy Gillespie

- Jazz Recital (Norgran, 1955)
- The Greatest Trumpet of Them All (Verve, 1957)

With Benny Golson

- Benny Golson's New York Scene (Contemporary, 1957)
- The Modern Touch (Riverside, 1957) – arranger
- Benny Golson and the Philadelphians (United Artists, 1958) – arranger

With Thelonious Monk

- Monk's Music (Riverside, 1957)
- Thelonious Monk with John Coltrane (Riverside, 1957 [1961])

With Oscar Pettiford

- Another One (Bethlehem, 1955)
- The Oscar Pettiford Orchestra in Hi-Fi (ABC-Paramount, 1956) – performer, composer and arranger
- The Oscar Pettiford Orchestra in Hi-Fi Volume Two (ABC-Paramount, 1958) – performer and arranger

With Max Roach

- The Max Roach Quartet featuring Hank Mobley (Debut, 1954)
- Rich Versus Roach (Mercury, 1959) – arranger

With Tony Scott

- The Touch of Tony Scott (RCA Victor, 1956)
- The Complete Tony Scott (RCA, Victor, 1957)

With others

- Teddy Charles, The Teddy Charles Tentet (Atlantic, 1956)
- Jimmy Cleveland, Rhythm Crazy (EmArcy, 1959 [1964]) – arranger
- Earl Coleman, Earl Coleman Returns (Prestige, 1956)
- Curtis Fuller, Sliding Easy (United Artists, 1959) – arranger
- Thad Jones, The Magnificent Thad Jones Vol. 3 (Blue Note, 1957)
- Duke Jordan, Do It Yourself Jazz Vol. 1 with Duke Jordan Oscar Pettiford, Kenny Clarke (Savoy, 1955)
- Herbie Mann, Salute to the Flute (Epic, 1957) – arranger
- Mat Mathews, The Modern Art of Jazz (Dawn, 1956)
- Big Maybelle, Big Maybelle Sings (Savoy, 1957)
- Howard McGhee, Howard McGhee Volume 2 (Blue Note, 1953)
- Lee Morgan, Lee Morgan Vol. 3 (Blue Note, 1957)
- Johnnie Ray, The Big Beat (Columbia, 1956)
- Mal Waldron, Mal-1 (Prestige, 1956)
- Randy Weston, Uhuru Afrika (Roulette, 1960)
- Leo Wright, Blues Shout (Atlantic, 1961) – arranger
