= Specs Powell =

American jazz musician (1922 – 2007)

Gordon "Specs" Powell (June 5, 1922 – September 15, 2007) was an American jazz drummer who began performing in the swing era.

== Career ==
Specs was the first black staff musician hired by CBS in 1943. Born in New York City, he started on piano but became exclusively a drummer by the late 1930s. He worked with Edgar Hayes (1939), Benny Carter (1941–42), and Ben Webster. He played percussion on the Ed Sullivan Show in the early 1960s and remained active professionally until 1970. At some point in the early 1960s he approached the Latin percussion maker Martin Cohen and had Cohen make for him an early (perhaps the first) bongo stand. In 2004 he was inducted into the Big Band Jazz Hall of Fame.

Powell was also a photographer, and his photographic archives of 2500 images are preserved in the Tom and Ethel Bradley Center at California State University, Northridge.

He died in San Diego of kidney disease at the age of 85.

== Discography ==
=== As leader ===
- Movin' in (Roulette, 1957)
- Specs Powell Presents Big Band Jazz (Strand, 1961)

=== As sideman ===
- Len Barry, Ups and Downs (Buddah, 1972)
- Billy Butler, Guitar Soul! (Prestige, 1969)
- Charlie Byrd, The Great Byrd (Columbia, 1968)
- Erroll Garner, The Most Happy Piano (Columbia, 1957)
- Erroll Garner, Encores in Hi Fi (Columbia, 1958)
- Charlie Kennedy & Charlie Ventura, Crazy Rhythms (Regent, 1957)
- Esther Marrow, Sister Woman (Fantasy, 1972)
- Percy Mayfield, Weakness Is a Thing Called Man (RCA Victor, 1970)
- Moondog, Moondog 2 (Columbia, 1971)
- Rose Murphy, Jazz, Joy, and Happiness (United Artists, 1962)
- Red Norvo, Gene Krupa, Charlie Ventura, Teddy Wilson, Jazz Concert (Jazztone, 1956)
- Oscar Peterson, The Oscar Peterson Trio and the Gerry Mulligan Quartet at Newport (Verve, 1963)
- Bernard Purdie, Soul Is... Pretty Purdie (Flying Dutchman, 1972)
- Chuck Rainey, The Chuck Rainey Coalition (Skye, 1972)
- Ray Repp, Hear the Cryin (Myrrh, 1972)
- Lightnin' Rod, Hustlers Convention (Celluloid, 1973)
- Shirley Scott, Soul Song (Atlantic, 1969)
- Charlie Shavers, The Complete Charlie Shavers with Maxine Sullivan (Bethlehem, 1957)
- Nina Simone, Nina Simone Sings the Blues (RCA Victor, 1967)
- Nina Simone, To Love Somebody (RCA Victor, 1969)
- Bert Sommer, The Road to Travel (Capitol, 1969)
- Bert Sommer, Inside (Eleuthera, 1970)
- Carla Thomas, Memphis Queen (Stax, 1969)
- Joe Thomas, Joy of Cookin' (Groove Merchant, 1972)
- Charlie Ventura, Jumping with Ventura (EmArcy, 1955)
- Charlie Ventura, East of Suez (Regent, 1958)
- Reuben Wilson, Set Us Free (Blue Note, 1971)
- Teddy Wilson, Teddy Wilson All Star Jazz Sextette (Allegro, 1956)
- Teddy Wilson, The Teddy Wilson Trio & Gerry Mulligan Quartet with Bob Brookmeyer at Newport (Verve, 1957)
