= Caiphus Semenya =

South African composer and musician

- Born: 19 August 1939 (age 87); Alexandra, Gauteng, Johannesburg, South Africa
- Genre: South African jazz
- Occupations: Musician, composer and arranger
- Instruments: Saxophone, percussion, synthesizer, vocals
- Years active: 1950s–present
- Spouse: Letta Mbulu

Caiphus Semenya (born 19 August 1939) is a South African composer and musician. As a young musician he sang in the cast of the jazz musical King Kong. After moving to the United States in the 1960s he had a successful career as a composer and arranger, including work on the scores for Roots (1977) and The Color Purple (1985).

== Biography ==
Caiphus Katse Semenya was born in Johannesburg's Alexandra Township on 19 August 1939 in a musically- inclined family. He attended Benoni High School, where he formed his first musical group, the Katzenjammer Kids. Members of the ensemble including Semenya were recruited to the cast of King Kong, an African jazz musical. On the set of King Kong he met his future wife, the singer Letta Mbulu.

Semenya left South Africa for the United States in the 1960s, together with his wife. He was spurred to do so by the conditions they faced in apartheid South Africa. In the US he worked with Hugh Masekela and Jonas Gwangwa on the album Union of South Africa, and sang backup for Miriam Makeba. His career as an arranger and composer gradually became more prominent than his singing. He was a member of the team that won recognition for its work on Roots, including an Emmy Award for Music Composition, and on the score of the 1985 film The Color Purple, which was nominated for an Academy Award for Best Original Score. He arranged music for Letta Mbulu, whose singing career found more success in the US, and for Harry Belafonte, who became a friend and mentor. Semenya also arranged the Swahili chant in the intro to Michael Jackson's song "Liberian Girl" from the 1987 album Bad. Semenya formed a recording label, "Munjale". He returned to South Africa in 1991.

== Awards ==
- 2015: South African Afro Music Awards
- 2015: ACT Lifetime Achievement Award for Music
- 1986: Academy Award for Best Original Score for the 1985 film The Color Purple; shared the nomination with nine other composers.

== Discography ==
- The Very Best of Caiphus Semenya (Columbia, 1996)
- Woman Got a Right to Be (1996)
- Streams Today... Rivers Tomorrow (Munjale, 1984)
- Listen to the Wind (CBS, 1982)

With Quincy Jones

- Roots (A&M, 1977)
