= Trane's Blues =

Compilation album by John Coltrane
- Released: January 26, 1999
- Recorded: March 1 or 2, 1956 (1); September 21, 1956 (4); April 6, 1957 (7); September 1, 1957 (3); September 15, 1957 (2,5); October 13, 1958 (8); September 8, 1960 (6)
- Genre: Jazz
- Length: 70:18
- Label: Blue Note Records

Trane's Blues is a compact disc credited to the jazz musician John Coltrane, released in 1999 on Blue Note Records, catalogue 98240. It comprises recordings from sessions for Blue Note and United Artists Records with Coltrane as a sideman for Paul Chambers, Sonny Clark, Johnny Griffin, and Cecil Taylor. These recordings were issued respectively on their Whims of Chambers, Sonny's Crib, A Blowin' Session, and Hard Driving Jazz albums. Two selections are from Coltrane's own 1958 record Blue Train, and "One and Four" had been previously unissued. "Trane's Blues" had been issued on the compilation High Step in 1975, previously known as "John Paul Jones" and named after himself, the bass player Chambers, and the drummer Philly Joe Jones. Like Prestige Records before them, as Coltrane's fame grew long after he had stopped recording for the label, Blue Note used varied recordings, often those where Coltrane had been merely a sideman, and reissued them as a new album with Coltrane's name prominently displayed. In this case, the Big Four conglomerate EMI continued that earlier practice.

== Reception ==
Professional ratings
Review scores
Source	Rating
Allmusic	4/5 stars
The Penguin Guide to Jazz	3/4 stars

In review for AllMusic, Stephen Cook wrote: "Trane's Blues will no doubt be of interest to fans looking beyond the tenor great's extensive Prestige, Atlantic, and Impulse! catalogs."

== Track listing ==
1. "Trane's Blues" (Coltrane) — 6:54
2. "Locomotion" (Coltrane) — 7:11
3. "Sonny's Crib" (Sonny Clark) — 13:26
4. "Just for the Love" (Coltrane) — 3:41
5. "Blue Train" (Coltrane) — 10:40
6. "One and Four (aka Mr. Day)" [Coltrane] — 7:35
7. "Smoke Stack" (Johnny Griffin) — 10:13
8. "Shifting Down" (Kenny Dorham) — 10:38

== Personnel ==
- John Coltrane — tenor saxophone
- Lee Morgan — trumpet on "Locomotion," "Blue Train," "Smoke Stack"
- Donald Byrd — trumpet on "Sonny's Crib," "Just for the Love"
- Kenny Dorham — trumpet on "Shifting Down"
- Curtis Fuller — trombone on "Locomotion," "Sonny's Crib," "Blue Train"
- Johnny Griffin — tenor saxophone on "Smoke Stack"
- Hank Mobley — tenor saxophone on "Smoke Stack"
- Kenny Drew — piano on "Trane's Blues," "Locomotion," "Blue Train"
- Sonny Clark — piano on "Sonny's Crib"
- Horace Silver — piano on "Just for the Love"
- McCoy Tyner — piano on "One for Four"
- Wynton Kelly — piano on "Smoke Stack"
- Cecil Taylor — piano on "Shifting Down"
- Kenny Burrell — guitar on "Just for the Love"
- Paul Chambers — bass on "Trane's Blues," "Locomotion," "Sonny's Crib," "Just for the Love," "Blue Train," "Smoke Stack"
- Steve Davis — bass on "One for Four"
- Chuck Israels — bass on "Shifting Down"
- Philly Joe Jones — drums on "Trane's Blues," "Locomotion," "Just for the Love," "Blue Train"
- Art Taylor — drums on "Sonny's Crib"
- Billy Higgins — drums on "One for Four"
- Art Blakey — drums on "Smoke Stack"
- Louis Hayes — drums on "Shifting Down"
