= Everything I Love =

Everything I Love may refer to:

- Everything I Love (Alan Jackson album), 1996
  - "Everything I Love" (Alan Jackson song), this album's title track
- "Ev'rything I Love", a 1941 song from Cole Porter's Let's Face It!
- Everything I Love (Eliane Elias album), 2000
- Everything I Love (Jason Blaine album), 2013
- Everything I Love (Kenny Drew album), 1974
- Everything I Love (Roland Hanna album), 2002
- "Everything I Love" (Morgan Wallen song), 2023
