= Kenny Drew Trio =

Studio album by Kenny Drew
- Released: 1956
- Recorded: September 20 & 26, 1956; New York City
- Studio: Reeves Sound Studios
- Genre: Jazz
- Length: 42:51
- Labels: Riverside; RLP 12-224
- Producers: Orrin Keepnews and Bill Grauer

Kenny Drew chronology
Embers Glow (1956)	Kenny Drew Trio (1956)	A Harry Warren Showcase (1957)

Kenny Drew Trio is an album by pianist Kenny Drew, recorded in 1956 and released on Riverside. The album features Drew's tribute to jazz patron Baroness Pannonica de Koenigswarter "Blues for Nica". This band was the rhythm section the following year on sessions for John Coltrane that yielded Blue Train.

== Reception ==
Professional ratings
Review scores
Source	Rating
AllMusic	4/5 stars
The Rolling Stone Jazz Record Guide	3/5 stars
The Penguin Guide to Jazz Recordings	2.5/4 stars

The AllMusic review by Scott Yanow states: "Although Drew would have to move to Europe in the early '60s in order to get the recognition he deserved, it is obvious (in hindsight) from this enjoyable date that he was already a major improviser."

== Track listing ==
=== Side one ===
No.	Title	Writer(s)	Length
1.	"Caravan"	Duke Ellington, Irving Mills, Juan Tizol	4:56
2.	"Come Rain or Come Shine"	Harold Arlen, Johnny Mercer	6:08
3.	"Ruby, My Dear"	Thelonious Monk	5:46
4.	"Weird-O"	Hank Mobley	4:04

=== Side two ===
No.	Title	Writer(s)	Length
1.	"Taking A Chance On Love"	Vernon Duke, John Latouche, Ted Fetter	4:42
2.	"When You Wish Upon a Star"	Leigh Harline, Ned Washington	5:19
3.	"Blues for Nica"	Kenny Drew	5:31
4.	"It's Only a Paper Moon"	Harold Arlen, E. Y. "Yip" Harburg, Billy Rose	6:25

== Personnel ==
- Kenny Drew – piano
- Paul Chambers – bass
- Philly Joe Jones – drums
- Roy De Carava - coverphoto

== Charts ==
Chart performance for Kenny Drew Trio
Chart (2025)	Peak position
Greek Albums (IFPI)	32
