= Solo-Duo =

Compilation album by Kenny Drew
- Released: May 7, 1996
- Recorded: 1966, 1977, 1983
- Genre: Hard bop
- Label: Storyville Records
- Producer: Borge Roger-Henrichsen, Ib Skovgaard

Professional ratings
Review scores
Source	Rating
Allmusic	4/5 stars
The Penguin Guide to Jazz Recordings	3/4 stars

Solo-Duo is a compilation album released after Kenny Drew's death in 1996 consisting of dates recorded in the years of 1966, 1977 and 1983. The album features solo work as well as duo work, performed on separate dates with double-bassists Bo Stief and Niels-Henning Ørsted Pedersen.

== Track listing ==
1. Ev'rything I Love (6:51)
2. Ode to Mariann (3:04)
3. Willow Weep for Me (3:36)
4. Swingin' Till the Girls Come Home (6:41)
5. Yesterdays (5:33)
6. Blues for Nils (4:17)
7. Simple Need (2:59)
8. Whisper Not (3:58)
9. Blues for Nils (10:08)
10. There's No Greater Love (7:49)
11. Ack Värmeland du Sköna (8:09)
12. Bluesology (6:21)

== Personnel ==
- Kenny Drew - piano
- Bo Stief - double-bass
- Niels-Henning Ørsted Pedersen - double bass
