= And Far Away =

Studio album by Kenny Drew
- Released: 1983
- Recorded: February 21, 1983
- Studio: Barigozzi Studios, Milano, Italy
- Genre: Jazz
- Length: 43:11
- Label: Soul Note; SN 1081
- Producer: Giovanni Bonandrini

Kenny Drew chronology
| Swingin' Love (1983) | And Far Away (1983) | Fantasia (1983) |

And Far Away is an album by American jazz pianist Kenny Drew recorded in 1983 and released on the Soul Note label.

== Reception ==
Professional ratings
Review scores
| Source | Rating |
|---|---|
| Allmusic | 4/5 stars |
| The Penguin Guide to Jazz Recordings | 2.5/4 stars |

The Allmusic review states "This Kenny Drew session from 1983 takes the pianist out of familiar hard bop territory".

== Track listing ==
All compositions by Kenny Drew except as indicated

1. "And Far Away" - 9:10
2. "Rianne" (Philip Catherine) - 8:10
3. "Serenity" - 4:57
4. "I Love You" (Cole Porter) - 7:15
5. "Twice a Week" (Catherine) - 2:23
6. "Autumn Leaves" (Joseph Kosma, Johnny Mercer, Jacques Prévert) - 7:50
7. "Blues Run" - 3:26

== Personnel ==
- Kenny Drew - piano
- Philip Catherine - guitar
- Niels-Henning Ørsted Pedersen - bass
- Barry Altschul - drums
