= If You Could See Me Now (Kenny Drew album) =

Album by pianist Kenny Drew

Studio album by Kenny Drew
- Released: 1975
- Recorded: May 21–22, 1974
- Studios: Rosenberg Studie, Copenhagen, Denmark
- Genre: Jazz
- Length: 50:53
- Labels: SteepleChase; SCS-1034
- Producer: Nils Winther

Kenny Drew chronology
Dark Beauty (1974)	If You Could See Me Now (1975)	Duo Live in Concert (1974)

Professional ratings
Review scores
Source	Rating
AllMusic	4/5 stars

If You Could See Me Now is an album by pianist Kenny Drew recorded in 1974 and released on the SteepleChase label.

== Reception ==
The AllMusic review awarded the album 4 stars.

== Track listing ==
1. "In Your Own Sweet Way" (Dave Brubeck) – 7:32
2. "If You Could See Me Now" (Tadd Dameron, Carl Sigman) – 4:01
3. "All Souls Here" (Kenny Drew) – 5:21
4. "I'm Old Fashioned" (Jerome Kern, Johnny Mercer) – 5:55
5. "Free Flight" (Kenny Drew) – 6:14 Bonus track on CD
6. "Run Away" (Per Carsten) – 5:56 Bonus track on CD
7. "Summer Night" (Al Dubin, Harry Warren) – 3:58 Bonus track on CD
8. "A Stranger in Paradise" (Alexander Borodin, George Forrest, Robert Wright) – 7:53
9. "Prelude to a Kiss" (Duke Ellington, Irving Gordon, Irving Mills) – 5:05
10. "This Is the Moment" (Frederick Hollander) – 8:01
11. "Oleo" (Sonny Rollins) – 3:28

== Personnel ==
- Kenny Drew – piano
- Niels-Henning Ørsted Pedersen – bass
- Albert Heath – drums
