= Jaywalkin' =

Studio album by Niels-Henning Ørsted Pedersen
- Released: 1975
- Recorded: September 10 & 11 and December 10, 1975 at Rosenberg Studio in Copenhagen, Denmark
- Genre: Jazz
- Length: 50:01
- Label: SteepleChase SCS 1041
- Producer: Nils Winther

Niels-Henning Ørsted Pedersen chronology
Duo Live in Concert (1974)	Jaywalkin' (1975)	Double Bass (1976)

Jaywalkin' is the first album solely credited to Danish bassist Niels-Henning Ørsted Pedersen which was recorded in 1975 and released on the Danish SteepleChase label.

== Reception ==
Professional ratings
Review scores
Source	Rating
AllMusic	3.5/5 stars
The Rolling Stone Jazz Record Guide	3/5 stars
The Penguin Guide to Jazz Recordings	3/4 stars

In his review for AllMusic, Ken Dryden called the album "a bit of a mixed bag" and said "Fortunately, Pedersen rarely utilized electric piano on future sessions as a leader".

== Track listing ==
All compositions by Niels-Henning Ørsted Pedersen except as indicated

1. "Summer Song" - 5:15
2. "Sparkling Eyes" - 5:12
3. "A Felicidade" (Antônio Carlos Jobim) - 6:15
4. "Jaywalkin'" - 6:13
5. "My Little Anna" - 6:25
6. "Yesterday's Future" - 5:34
7. "Interlude" - 1:44
8. "Cheryl" (Charlie Parker) - 5:31
9. "That's All" (Alan Brandt, Bob Haymes) - 2:58
10. "Summer Song #5" - 5:09 Bonus track on CD reissue

== Personnel ==
- Niels-Henning Ørsted Pedersen - bass
- Philip Catherine - guitar
- Ole Kock Hansen - electric piano
- Billy Higgins - drums
