= I Love Jerome Kern =

Studio album by Kenny Drew
- Released: 1957
- Recorded: February 1957; New York City
- Genre: Jazz
- Length: 34:12
- Label: Riverside; RLP 12-811
- Producer: Orrin Keepnews

Kenny Drew chronology
| A Harold Arlen Showcase (1957) | I Love Jerome Kern (1957) | This Is New (1957) |

Professional ratings
Review scores
| Source | Rating |
|---|---|
| Allmusic | 3/5 stars |

I Love Jerome Kern is an album by pianist Kenny Drew recorded in 1957 and released on the Riverside label. The album was rereleased on CD by Lone Hill Jazz coupled with Drew's Pal Joey (Riverside, 1957) as The Complete Jerome Kern / Rodgers & Hart Songbooks in 2008.

== Track listing ==
1. "The Way You Look Tonight" (Dorothy Fields, Jerome Kern) - 2:25
2. "I've Told Ev'ry Little Star" (Oscar Hammerstein II, Kern) - 2:29
3. "Can't Help Lovin' Dat Man" (Hammerstein, Kern) - 3:45
4. "Make Believe" (Hammerstein, Kern) - 2:21
5. "I'm Old Fashioned" (Kern, Johnny Mercer) - 3:07
6. "All the Things You Are" (Hammerstein, Kern) - 2:37
7. "Long Ago (and Far Away)" (Ira Gershwin, Kern) - 2:49
8. "All Through the Day" (Hammerstein, Kern) - 2:14
9. "The Song Is You" (Hammerstein, Kern) - 2:32
10. "Smoke Gets in Your Eyes" (Otto Harbach, Kern) - 3:23
11. "Why Do I Love You?" (Hammerstein, Kern) - 2:15
12. "Yesterdays" (Harbach, Kern) - 4:15

== Personnel ==
- Kenny Drew - piano
- Wilbur Ware - bass
