= Dark Beauty =

Studio album by Kenny Drew Trio
- Released: 1974
- Recorded: May 21–22, 1974; Copenhagen
- Genre: Jazz
- Length: 66:06
- Label: SteepleChase; SCS-1016
- Producer: Nils Winther

Kenny Drew Trio chronology
Duo 2 (1974)	Dark Beauty (1974)	If You Could See Me Now (1974)

Professional ratings
Review scores
Source	Rating
AllMusic	3.5/5 stars
The Rolling Stone Jazz Record Guide	3/5 stars

Dark Beauty is an album by American pianist Kenny Drew recorded in 1974 and released on SteepleChase.

== Track listing ==
1. "Run Away" (Carstens) – 6:18
2. "Dark Beauty" (Drew) – 5:37
3. "Summernight" (Al Dubin, Harry Warren) – 4:10
4. "All Blues" (Miles Davis) – 6:28
5. "A Felicidade" (Luiz Bonfá, Antônio Carlos Jobim) – 6:00
6. "It Could Happen to You" (Jimmy Van Heusen, Johnny Burke) – 6:59
7. "Love Letters" (Victor Young, Edward Heyman) – 5:15
8. "Silk Bossa" (Clausen) – 5:06
9. "Blues Inn" (Drew) – 4:54
10. "In Your Own Sweet Way" (Dave Brubeck) – 7:15
11. "Stranger in Paradise" – 8:04

Tracks 1, 2, 4, 5, 7, 11 recorded on May 21, 1974; the rest recorded on May 22.

== Personnel ==
- Kenny Drew – piano
- Niels-Henning Ørsted Pedersen – bass
- Albert Heath – drums
