= High Step =

Jazz double album

Compilation album by Paul Chambers and John Coltrane
- Released: 1975
- Recorded: March 1 or 2, 1956 (1–6); April 20, 1956 (11–13); September 21, 1956 (7–10)
- Genre: Jazz
- Label: Blue Note Records

High Step is a jazz double album credited to bassist Paul Chambers and saxophonist John Coltrane, issued in 1975 on Blue Note Records, catalogue BN-LA451. It is a compilation taken from the 1956 Chambers' Music on the Jazz West label and Whims of Chambers, along with two unissued recordings from a session in Boston, Massachusetts, "Trane's Strain" from that session previously appearing on an anthology. Originally, all of these sessions were led by Chambers, but like Prestige Records before them, as Coltrane's fame grew long after he had stopped recording for the label, Blue Note used varied recordings where Coltrane had been merely a sideman, and reissued them with Coltrane's name more prominently displayed.

== Reception ==
Professional ratings
Review scores
Source	Rating
AllMusic	4/5 stars

In a review for AllMusic, Jim Todd wrote: "While Paul Chambers and John Coltrane get top billing, this collection is valuable for strong performances from each member of the elite company on this 1974 Blue Note two-fer... Coltrane, Chambers, and drummer Philly Joe Jones are the common denominators on these mid-'50s hard bop dates... Trumpeter Donald Byrd, pianist Horace Silver, and guitarist Kenny Burrell are all at the top of their games... Chambers, naturally, is featured prominently. His bowed and pizzicato work here is among his best. Jones is a dynamo -- powerful, swinging, creative, a source of energy and inspiration for the others."

== Track listing ==
Side one

1. "Dexterity" (Charlie Parker) – 6:28 Originally released on Chambers' Music
2. "Stablemates" (Benny Golson) – 5:50 Originally released on Chambers' Music
3. "Easy to Love" (Cole Porter) – 3:50 Originally released on Chambers' Music
4. "Visitation" (Paul Chambers) – 4:53 Originally released on Chambers' Music

Side two

5. "John Paul Jones (Trane's Blues)" – 6:55 Originally released on Chambers' Music
6. "Eastbound" – 4:20 Originally released on Chambers' Music
7. "Nita" (John Coltrane) – 6:30 Originally released on Whims of Chambers
8. "Just for the Love" (John Coltrane) – 3:40 Originally released on Whims of Chambers

Side three

9. "We Six" (Donald Byrd) – 7:40 Originally released on Whims of Chambers
10. "Omicron" (Donald Byrd) – 7:15 Originally released on Whims of Chambers
11. "High Step" (Benny Harris) – 8:05

Side four

12. "Trane's Strain" – 11:00 Originally released on the sampler Jazz in Transition ( Transition Records, TRLP 30 )
13. "Nixon, Dixon and Yates Blues" – 8:25

== Personnel ==
- Paul Chambers – bass
- John Coltrane – tenor saxophone except "Visitation"
- Donald Byrd – trumpet on "Nita," "Just for the Love," "We Six," "Omicron"
- Curtis Fuller – trombone on "Trane's Strain," "High Step," "Nixon, Dixon and Yates Blues"
- Pepper Adams – baritone saxophone on "Trane's Strain," "High Step," "Nixon, Dixon and Yates Blues"
- Kenny Burrell – electric guitar on "Nita," "Just for the Love," "We Six," "Omicron"
- Kenny Drew – piano on "Dexterity," "Stablemates," "Easy to Love," "Visitation," "John Paul Jones," "Eastbound"
- Horace Silver – piano on "Nita," "Just for the Love," "We Six," "Omicron"
- Roland Alexander – piano on "Trane's Strain"
- "Philly" Joe Jones – drums
