= Morning (Kenny Drew album) =

Studio album by Kenny Drew Trio
- Released: Early 1976
- Recorded: September 8, 1975; Copenhagen
- Genre: Jazz
- Length: 36:17 original LP; 53:19 CD reissue
- Label: SteepleChase; SCS-1048
- Producer: Nils Winther

Kenny Drew Trio chronology
Duo Live in Concert (1974)	Morning (1976)	In Concert (1977)

Professional ratings
Review scores
Source	Rating
AllMusic	3/5 stars
The Penguin Guide to Jazz Recordings	3/4 stars

Morning is an album by American pianist Kenny Drew recorded in 1975 and released on SteepleChase Records in 1976. The album was first issued on CD in 1987 with a slightly different cover. "An Evening in the Park" is about an early spring, peaceful bicycling through Copenhagen's Fælledparken, a park not far from Drew's home back then. "Morning" was originally written for three instruments, but in the studio Pedersen suggested that Drew and Philip Catherine should try it as a duo.

== Track listing ==
All pieces composed by Kenny Drew, unless otherwise noted.

1. "An Evening in the Park" – 7:27
2. "Autumn Leaves" (Kosma, Mercer, Prevert) – 10:34
3. "Bossa Mood" – 7:11 Bonus track on CD
4. "Poor Brother's Blues" – 9:51 Bonus track on CD
5. "Morning" - (Per Carstens) – 9:18
6. "Isn't It Romantic?" (Hart, Rodgers) – 8:58

== Personnel ==
- Kenny Drew – piano
- Niels-Henning Ørsted Pedersen – bass
- Philip Catherine – guitar
