= This Is New =

This Is New may refer to:

- This Is New (song) - a 1941 popular song by Kurt Weill and Ira Gershwin
- This Is New (Dee Dee Bridgewater album), 2002
- This Is New (Kenny Drew album), 1957
