= Ruby, My Dear =

Ruby, My Dear may refer to:

- Ruby, My Dear (composition), a composition by Thelonious Monk
- Ruby, My Dear (album), an album by Kenny Drew
