= It Might as Well Be Spring (Kenny Drew album) =

Studio album by Kenny Drew
- Released: 1982
- Recorded: November 23, 1981
- Studio: Barigozzi Studios, Milano, Italy
- Genre: Jazz
- Length: 42:53
- Label: Soul Note; SN 1040
- Producer: Giovanni Bonandrini

Kenny Drew chronology
All the Things You Are (1981)	It Might as Well Be Spring (1982)	Havin' Myself a Time (1981)

Professional ratings
Review scores
Source	Rating
Allmusic	4.5/5 stars

It Might as Well Be Spring is a solo album by American jazz pianist Kenny Drew recorded in 1981 and released on the Soul Note label.

== Reception ==
The Allmusic review awarded the album 4½ stars stating "Kenny Drew's 1981 solo piano session for Soul Note is a notch better than his 1973 Steeplechase CD, Everything I Love. In the space of less than a decade, the veteran shows tremendous growth".

== Track listing ==
All compositions by Kenny Drew except as indicated

1. "Yesterdays" (Otto Harbach, Jerome Kern) - 6:43
2. "Blues for Nils" - 4:25
3. "The Quiet Cathedral" - 5:13
4. "Sunset" - 4:35
5. "It Might as Well Be Spring" (Oscar Hammerstein II, Richard Rodgers) - 7:01
6. "The Smile of Tanya" (Sahib Shihab) - 5:12
7. "Django" (John Lewis) - 6:04
8. "Dreams" - 3:40

== Personnel ==
- Kenny Drew - piano
