= A Harry Warren Showcase =

Studio album by Kenny Drew
- Released: 1957
- Recorded: February 1957; New York City
- Genre: Jazz
- Length: 35:55
- Label: Judson; L 3004
- Producer: Orrin Keepnews and Bill Grauer, Jr.

Kenny Drew chronology
Kenny Drew Trio (1957)	A Harry Warren Showcase (1957)	A Harold Arlen Showcase (1957)

Professional ratings
Review scores
Source	Rating
Allmusic	4/5 stars

A Harry Warren Showcase is an album by pianist Kenny Drew recorded in 1957 and released on the Riverside Records subsidiary Judson label. The album was rereleased on CD by Milestone Records as a compilation with its companion album A Harold Arlen Showcase as Kenny Drew Plays the Music of Harry Warren and Harold Arlen in 1995.

== Reception ==
The Allmusic review called the compilation "melodic, tasteful and lightly swinging... a nice set if not all that essential".

== Track listing ==
1. "You Must Have Been a Beautiful Baby" (Johnny Mercer, Harry Warren) – 2:02
2. "Lullaby of Broadway" (Al Dubin, Warren) – 1:55
3. "Remember Me" (Dubin, Warren) – 3:55
4. "Jeepers Creepers" (Mercer, Warren) – 3:06
5. "I Only Have Eyes for You" (Dubin, Warren) – 4:02
6. "You're My Everything" (Mort Dixon, Joe Young, Warren) – 2:42
7. "You'll Never Know" (Mack Gordon, Warren) – 2:52
8. "The Boulevard of Broken Dreams" (Dubin, Warren) – 4:04
9. "You're Getting to Be a Habit with Me" (Dubin, Warren) – 2:04
10. "Serenade in Blue" (Gordon, Warren) – 3:05
11. "About a Quarter to Nine" (Dubin, Warren) – 2:33
12. "September in the Rain" (Dubin, Warren) – 2:35

== Personnel ==
- Kenny Drew – piano
- Wilbur Ware – bass
