= 1st Bassman =

Studio album by Paul Chambers
- Released: 1961
- Recorded: May 12, 1960
- Studio: Bell Sound (New York City)
- Genre: Jazz
- Length: 30:05
- Label: Vee-Jay; VJLP 3012
- Producer: Sid McCoy

Paul Chambers chronology
Go (1959)	1st Bassman (1961)

1st Bassman is an album by jazz bassist Paul Chambers, recorded at Bell Sound Studios on May 12, 1960 and released by the Vee-Jay label. This album is notable for its featured use of the acoustic bass as the lead instrument. Chambers is supported by trumpeter Tommy Turrentine, trombonist Curtis Fuller, tenor saxophonist Yusef Lateef, pianist Wynton Kelly and drummer Lex Humphries.

== Critical reception ==
Professional ratings
Review scores
Source	Rating
AllMusic	4/5 stars
The Penguin Guide to Jazz Recordings	3/4 stars

AllMusic reviewer Michael G. Nastos stated "Chambers was allowed to put his bass on top, become a leader in his own right, and play lead melodies with a clear, ringing, well enunciated tone. 1st Bassman is anchored by rising stars from Detroit such as Yusef Lateef, Curtis Fuller ... The emphasis on the compositions of Lateef all display a spare construct, rearing the horns to a marginal level except for solos, allowing Chambers to take care of business and control the shaping of the melodies, with little unison play involved. ... This CD and its companion piece Go complement the preceding Blue Note sessions, comprising a small but potent body of work that few bassists have produced in modern jazz". Reviewing The Complete Vee Jay Paul Chambers/Wynton Kelly Sessions 1959-61 for All About Jazz C. Michael Hovan said "there seems to be some very perceptible growth in Chamber’s ability to move the date beyond your average blowing session. All the tunes are by Yusef Lateef and he manages to develop interesting structures that stimulate the creative juices of a fantastic sextet". In JazzTimes Harvey Pekar wrote "The soloists here do a fine job of making their work consistent with the character of the compositions. Chambers’ work is prominently featured, and he plays thoughtfully as well as exhibiting his vaunted chops".

== Track listing ==
All compositions by Yusef Lateef except where noted

1. "Melody" – 4:08
2. "Bass Region'" – 10:35
3. "Retrogress" – 3:29
4. "Mopp Shoe Blues" – 6:05
5. "Blessed" – 7:04
6. "Who's Blues" (Cannonball Adderley) – 8:24

== Personnel ==
- Paul Chambers - bass
- Tommy Turrentine - trumpet
- Curtis Fuller - trombone
- Yusef Lateef - tenor saxophone, flute
- Wynton Kelly - piano
- Lex Humphries - drums
