= Dancing on the Tables =

Studio album by Niels-Henning Ørsted Pedersen Quartet
- Released: 1979
- Recorded: July 3–4 and August 30, 1979
- Genre: Jazz
- Length: 39:46
- Label: SteepleChase SCS 1125
- Producer: Nils Winther

Niels-Henning Ørsted Pedersen chronology
Trio 2 (1977)	Dancing on the Tables (1979)	Just the Way You Are (1980)

Dancing on the Tables is a studio album by jazz bassist Niels-Henning Ørsted Pedersen, which was recorded in 1979 and released on the Danish SteepleChase label.

== Reception ==
Professional ratings
Review scores
Source	Rating
AllMusic	4/5 stars

In his review for AllMusic, Scott Yanow said "The bassist contributed four compositions, which are joined by a Danish folk song. The nearly 15-minute "Dancing on the Tables" (which utilizes some childlike melodies) and the episodic "Clouds" are highlights of the continually intriguing and adventurous program".

== Track listing ==
All compositions by Niels-Henning Ørsted Pedersen except where noted.

1. "Dancing on the Tables" – 14:48
2. "Future Child" – 1:37
3. "Jeg Gik Mig Ud en Sommerdag" (Traditional) – 3:32
4. "Evening Song" – 9:30
5. "Clouds" – 10:19

== Personnel ==
- Niels-Henning Ørsted Pedersen – bass
- Dave Liebman – tenor saxophone, soprano saxophone, flute
- John Scofield – guitar
- Billy Hart – drums
