= Strollin' =

Live album by Chet Baker
- Released: 1986
- Recorded: June 1985, in Münster, West Germany
- Genre: West Coast jazz, cool jazz
- Length: 41:22
- Label: Enja Records

Chet Baker chronology
Chet's Choice (1985)	Strollin' (1986)	Candy (1985)

Strollin' is a live album by jazz trumpeter Chet Baker, recorded 1985 at the 7th Jazz Festival of Münster, West Germany and released in 1986 by Enja Records. It features Chet Baker on trumpet and vocals, Belgian guitarist Philip Catherine, and Belgian bassist Jean-Louis Rassinfosse.

== Track listing ==
1. "Sad Walk" (Bob Zieff) – 9:58 Bonus track on CD release
2. "Strollin'" (Horace Silver) – 9:10
3. "Love for Sale" (Cole Porter) – 9:31
4. "Leaving" (Richie Beirach) – 15:19
5. "But Not for Me" (George Gershwin, Ira Gershwin) – 7:22

== Personnel ==
- Chet Baker – trumpet, vocals on "But Not for Me"
- Philip Catherine – electric guitar
- Jean-Louis Rassinfosse – double bass

Production notes:

- Jörg Meilicke – recording
- Frank Schraven – recording
- H.J. Gally – cover art
- Elisabeth Winckelmann – album design
