= While We Were Waiting =

Studio album by Jason Blaine
- Released: July 26, 2005
- Genre: Country
- Length: 35:32
- Label: Icon
- Producer: Jason Barry; Jason Blaine

Jason Blaine chronology
While We Were Waiting (2005)	Make My Move (2008)

While We Were Waiting is the first studio album by Canadian country music singer-songwriter Jason Blaine. The album was released on independent record label Jay Bird Music on July 26, 2005. Icon Records re-released the album on June 24, 2006.

== Track listing ==
1. "While We Were Waiting" (Paul Brandt, Jason Blaine) – 3:16
2. "What I Can't Forget" (Deric Ruttan, Margaret Findley, Jim McBride) – 3:20
3. "Change the Channel" (Blaine) – 3:18
4. "Heartache Like Mine" (Blaine) – 4:38
5. "Last Slow Dance" (Blaine) – 3:20
6. "What Makes a Man" (Sean Patrick McGraw, Blaine, Rory Lee Feek) – 3:09
7. "Reinvent the Wheel" (Blaine) – 3:52
8. "Say It Again" (Blaine) – 3:47
9. "That Shine" (Blaine) – 3:11
10. "That's What I Do" (Blaine) – 3:41
