= Jason Blaine =

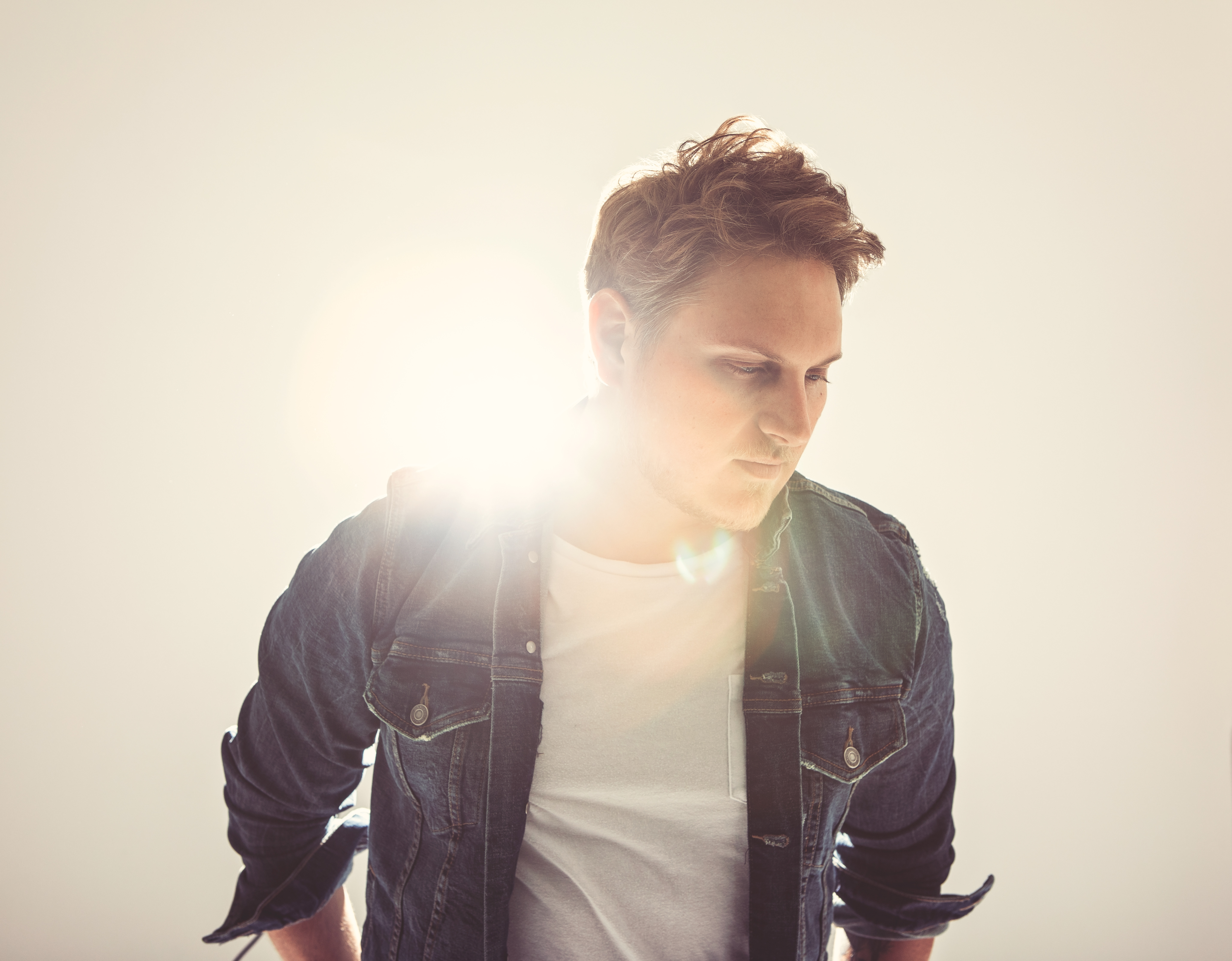
- Blaine in 2019.

Background information
- Born: April 19, 1980 (age 46); Pembroke, Ontario, Canada
- Origin: Nashville, Tennessee, U.S.
- Genres: Country
- Occupation: Singer-songwriter
- Instrument: Vocals
- Years active: 2003-present
- Labels: Icon; Koch; E1 Canada; Wax; eOne; The Orchard

Jason Blaine McEwen (born April 19, 1980) is a Canadian country music singer/songwriter from Pembroke, Ontario. Blaine is a multiple Canadian Country Music Association (CCMA), SOCAN & Country Music Association of Ontario Award winner with over 20 Canadian country radio hits. Twelve of those went on to become Billboard Canada Country top ten singles including "Country Side", "Friends of Mine", "They Don't Make 'Em Like That Anymore", and "The Road That Raised You Up".

== Family ==
Blaine lives in the greater Nashville area with his wife, Amy, and their four children.

== Career ==
Blaine's first hit single, "Rock in My Boot", was released in 2007. It received multiple CCMA nominations and led to him performing at major festival appearances across Canada. His most successful song to date was "They Don't Make 'Em Like That Anymore", which was written for his grandfather and released in 2012. The song eventually went on to win CCMA Single of the Year. Overall, Blaine has released seven full-length albums. He has also been a staff songwriter in Nashville, writing songs for other artists including Chris Janson, Parmalee, Petric and Madeline Merlo.

== Discography ==
=== Albums ===
List of albums, with selected details
Title	Details
While We Were Waiting	Release date: July 6, 2005; Label: Icon Records
Make My Move	Release date: May 20, 2008; Label: Koch Entertainment
Sweet Sundown	Release date: March 30, 2010; Label: E1 Entertainment
Life So Far	Release date: September 27, 2011; Label: E1 Entertainment
Everything I Love	Release date: July 9, 2013; Label: E1 Entertainment
Country Side	Release date: October 23, 2015; Label: E1 Entertainment
Diamonds in the Desert	Release date: February 25, 2022; Label: Jason Blaine
Russham Road	Release date: August 29, 2025; Label: Jason Blaine

=== Extended plays ===
List of EPs, with selected details
Title	Details
Boy with a Guitar	Release date: November 10, 2017; Label: Wax Records
Go with Me	Release date: October 23, 2020; Label: eOne Music

=== Singles ===
==== As lead artist ====
List of singles, with selected chart positions
Year	Title	Peak positions		Album
Year	Title	CAN Country	CAN	Album
2003	"That's What I Do"	8	—	While We Were Waiting
2005	"Heartache Like Mine"	23	—	While We Were Waiting
2006	"While We Were Waiting"	24	—	While We Were Waiting
2006	"What I Can't Forget"	24	—	While We Were Waiting
2007	"Rock in My Boot"	9	92	Make My Move
2007	"Flirtin' with Me"	5	—	Make My Move
2008	"My First Car"	11	—	Make My Move
2008	"Good Day to Get Gone"	11	95	Make My Move
2009	"Give It to Me"	16	—	Make My Move
2010	"Numb"	11	—	Sweet Sundown
2010	"Run with Me"	12	99	Sweet Sundown
2010	"Hillbilly Girl"	29	—	Sweet Sundown
2011	"Watching the World Go Round"	50	—	Life So Far
2011	"Don't Make 'Em Like That Anymore"	8	—	Life So Far
2012	"Cool"	7	79	Life So Far
2012	"On a Night Like This"	10	—	Life So Far
2013	"Rock It Country Girl"	13	80	Everything I Love
2013	"Feels Like That"	18	—	Everything I Love
2014	"Friends of Mine"	12	84	Everything I Love
2014	"Layin' Your Love on Me"	46	—	Everything I Love
2015	"Country Side"	6	86	Country Side
2015	"Travelin' Light"	—	—	Country Side
2015	"Spotlight"	11	—	Country Side
2016	"Dance with My Daughter"	43	—	Country Side
2016	"Back to You"	30	—	Country Side
2017	"Born to Love"	22	—	Boy with a Guitar
2018	"Boy with a Guitar"	36	—	Boy with a Guitar
2018	"Ain't Got Growin' Up Down Yet"	48	—	—N/a
2020	"Drink Too Much"	—	—	Go with Me
2020	"Mood Swing"	—	—	Go with Me
2021	"When I See You"	—	—	Go with Me
2021	"End of the Rain"	—	—	Diamonds in the Desert
2023	"The Road That Raised You Up"	8	—	Russham Road
2023	"Boy Mama"	40	—	Russham Road
2024	"Somewhere Tonight"	—	—	Russham Road
"—" denotes releases that did not chart

==== As featured artist ====
Year	Single	Album
2010	"Don't Leave the Leavin'" (Victoria Banks featuring Jason Blaine)	When You Can Fly
2019	"Tell You'" (Alessia Cohle featuring Jason Blaine)	Non-album single

=== Music videos ===
Year	Video	Director
2003	"That's What I Do"	
2005	"Heartache Like Mine"	Stephano Barberis
2006	"While We Were Waiting"	Stephano Barberis
2006	"What I Can't Forget"	Stephano Barberis
2007	"Rock in My Boot"	
2007	"Flirtin' with Me"	
2008	"My First Car"	
2009	"Give It to Me"	Antonio Hrynchuk
2010	"Numb"	Warren P. Sonoda
2010	"Run with Me"	
2010	"Hillbilly Girl"	Warren P. Sonoda
2011	"They Don’t Make 'Em Like That Anymore"	
2012	"Cool"	
2012	"On a Night Like This"	Matt Braun
2013	"Feels Like That"	
2014	"Friends of Mine" (featuring Gord Bamford, Chad Brownlee, Deric Ruttan and Jason McCoy)	Sean Smith
2014	"Layin' Your Love on Me"	Stephano Barberis
2015	"Country Side"	Kirstin Barlowe
2015	"Spotlight"	Sean Smith
2016	"Dance with My Daughter"	David Pichette

== Awards and nominations ==
Year	Association	Category	Result
2004	Canadian Country Music Association	Independent Song of the Year – "That's What I Do"	Nominated
2006	Canadian Country Music Association	Chevy Trucks Rising Star Award	Nominated
2007	Canadian Country Music Association	Chevy Trucks Rising Star Award	Nominated
2008	Canadian Country Music Association	Top New Talent of the Year – Male	Nominated
2009	Canadian Country Music Association	Male Artist of the Year	Nominated
2012	Canadian Country Music Association	Male Artist of the Year	Nominated
2012	Canadian Country Music Association	Single of the Year – "They Don't Make 'Em Like That Anymore"	Won
2012	Canadian Country Music Association	Songwriter of the Year – "They Don't Make 'Em Like That Anymore"	Nominated
2013	Canadian Country Music Association	Songwriter of the Year – "Cool"	Nominated
2014	Canadian Country Music Association	CMT Video of the Year – "Friends of Mine"	Nominated
2015	Canadian Country Music Association	Songwriter of the Year – "Country Side"	Nominated
2015	Canadian Country Music Association	Video of the Year – "Country Side"	Nominated
2017	Country Music Association of Ontario	Album of the Year - Country Side	Nominated
2017	Country Music Association of Ontario	Male Artist of the Year	Nominated
2017	Country Music Association of Ontario	Fan's Choice	Nominated
2017	Country Music Association of Ontario	Video of the Year - "Dance With My Daughter"	Nominated
2022	Canadian Country Music Association	Alternative Country Album of the Year - Diamonds in the Desert	Nominated
2023	Country Music Association of Ontario	Album of the Year - Diamonds in the Desert	Nominated
2024	Country Music Association of Ontario	Male Artist of the Year	Nominated
2024	Country Music Association of Ontario	Single of the Year - "The Road That Raised You Up"	Won
2024	Country Music Association of Ontario	Songwriter(s) of the Year - "The Road That Raised You Up"	Won
