= Undercurrent (Kenny Drew album) =

Studio album by Kenny Drew
- Released: June 1961
- Recorded: December 11, 1960
- Studio: Van Gelder Studio, Englewood Cliffs, New Jersey
- Genre: Jazz
- Length: 38:46
- Label: Blue Note
- Producer: Alfred Lion

Kenny Drew chronology
Pal Joey (1959)	Undercurrent (1961)	Duo (1973)

Undercurrent is an album by American pianist Kenny Drew that was recorded in 1960 and released by Blue Note in 1961. It was Drew's last album for the label and his last album recorded in the U.S. before moving to Copenhagen, Denmark, in 1961.

== Reception ==
The Allmusic review by Michael G. Nastos gave the album 4½ stars and stated, "This is an extraordinary recording that reveals more upon repeat listenings".

Professional ratings
Review scores
Source	Rating
Allmusic	4.5/5 stars
The Penguin Guide to Jazz Recordings	3/4 stars

== Track listing ==
All tracks are written by Kenny Drew.

No.	Title	Length
1.	"Undercurrent"	7:20
2.	"Funk-Cosity"	8:28
3.	"Lion's Den"	4:56
4.	"The Pot's On"	6:08
5.	"Groovin' the Blues"	6:22
6.	"Ballade"	5:32

== Personnel ==
- Kenny Drew – piano
- Freddie Hubbard – trumpet
- Hank Mobley – tenor saxophone
- Sam Jones – double bass
- Louis Hayes – drums
