= Duo 2 =

Studio album by Kenny Drew and Niels-Henning Ørsted Pedersen
- Released: 1974
- Recorded: February 11–12, 1974
- Studio: Rosenberg Studio, Copenhagen, Denmark
- Genre: Jazz
- Length: 50:53
- Label: SteepleChase; SCS-1010
- Producer: Nils Winther

Kenny Drew chronology
Everything I Love (1973)	Duo 2 (1974)	Dark Beauty (1974)

Niels-Henning Ørsted Pedersen chronology
Paul Bley/NHØP (1973)	Duo 2 (1974)	Two's Company (1974)

Professional ratings
Review scores
Source	Rating
Allmusic	4/5 stars
The Rolling Stone Jazz Record Guide	4/5 stars
The Penguin Guide to Jazz Recordings	3/4 stars

Duo 2 is an album by pianist Kenny Drew and bassist Niels-Henning Ørsted Pedersen recorded in 1974 and released on the SteepleChase label.

== Reception ==
The Allmusic review awarded the album 4 stars stating "The pianist's style was largely unchanged from the 1950s except that he had grown a bit as a player and was open to some more modern chord voicings. The music on this encounter with the virtuosic bassist Niels Pederson should easily appeal to Kenny Drew's fans".

== Track listing ==
1. "Jeg Gik Mig Over Sø Og Land" (Traditional) - 3:52
2. "Largo" (Kenny Drew) - 4:03
3. "My Little Suede Shoes" (Charlie Parker) - 4:30
4. "Trubbel" (Olle Adolphson) - 2:50
5. "Bluesology" (Milt Jackson ) - 6:18
6. "That's All" (Bob Haymes) - 2:29 Bonus track on CD
7. "You Don't Know What Love Is" (Gene DePaul, Don Raye) - 5:14 Bonus track on CD
8. "Viking's Blues" (Niels-Henning Ørsted Pedersen) - 6:37
9. "A Child Is Born" (Thad Jones) - 4:18
10. "It Might as Well Be Spring" (Oscar Hammerstein II, Richard Rodgers) - 5:45
11. "My Shining Hour" (Harold Arlen, Johnny Mercer) - 5:37

== Personnel ==
- Kenny Drew - piano
- Niels-Henning Ørsted Pedersen - bass
