= Kenny Drew and His Progressive Piano =

Studio album by Kenny Drew
- Released: 1954
- Recorded: 1953 and September 2, 1954; New York City and Los Angeles
- Genre: Jazz
- Length: 40:09
- Label: Norgran; MGN 1066
- Producer: Norman Granz

Kenny Drew chronology
| New Faces, New Sounds (1953) | Kenny Drew and His Progressive Piano (1954) | Talkin' & Walkin' (1955) |

The Modernity of Kenny Drew Cover

Professional ratings
Review scores
| Source | Rating |
|---|---|
| AllMusic | 3/5 stars |
| The Encyclopedia of Popular Music | 3/5 stars |

Kenny Drew and His Progressive Piano (also released as The Modernity of Kenny Drew) is a 12" LP record album by American jazz pianist Kenny Drew. It contains sessions recorded in 1953 and 1954 (some of which were originally released as a 10" LP The Ideation of Kenny Drew) and was released on the Norgran label.

== Reception ==
The AllMusic review states: "[T]his disc is well worth acquiring for bop fans." The Billboard reviewer wrote that Drew "shows off some bright, modern stylings on a group of standards that should please cool collectors."

== Track listing ==
All compositions by Kenny Drew except as indicated

1. "Bluesville" - 5:24
2. "Angie" - 5:36
3. "I Can Make You Love Me" (Peter DeRose, Bob Russell) - 3:56
4. "My Beautiful Lady" - 5:36
5. "Many Miles Away" - 2:43
6. "52nd Street Theme" (Thelonious Monk) - 3:23
7. "I'll Remember April" (Gene DePaul Patricia Johnston, Don Raye) - 6:37
8. "Four and Five" (Byron Gay, Marco H. Hellman) - 3:15
9. "Polka Dots and Moonbeams" (Jimmy Van Heusen, Johnny Burke) - 4:18
10. "Lo Flame" - 3:36
11. "Chartreuse" - 4:31
12. "Kenny's Blues" - 5:57
- Recorded in New York City in 1953 (tracks 1–5 & 7) and Los Angeles on September 2, 1954 (tracks 6 & 8–12)

== Personnel ==
- Kenny Drew - piano
- Gene Wright (tracks 1, 2 & 4–12) - double bass
- Lawrence Marable (tracks 6 & 8–12), Charles "Specs" Wright (tracks 1, 2, 4, 5 & 7) - drums
