= Lite Flite (album) =

Studio album by Kenny Drew
- Released: 1977
- Recorded: February 6, 1977; New York City
- Genre: Jazz
- Length: 51:08
- Label: SteepleChase; SCS-1077
- Producer: Nils Winther

Kenny Drew chronology
In Concert (1977)	Lite Flite (1977)	Ruby My Dear (1977)

Professional ratings
Review scores
Source	Rating
AllMusic	4/5 stars
The Penguin Guide to Jazz Recordings	3/4 stars
The Rolling Stone Jazz Record Guide	3/5 stars

Lite Flite is an album by pianist Kenny Drew, recorded in 1977 and released on the SteepleChase label.

== Track listing ==
All compositions by Kenny Drew except as indicated

1. "Yesterdays" (Otto Harbach, Jerome Kern) – 5:08
2. "Only You" – 6:48
3. "Precious Lady" (Per Goldschmidt) – 8:17
4. "All Your Words" (Idrees Sulieman) – 6:22
5. "Bossa Mood" – 8:01
6. "Lite Flite" – 8:14
7. "Precious Lady" [take 3] (Goldschmidt) – 8:18 Bonus track on CD

== Personnel ==
- Kenny Drew – piano
- Thad Jones – flugelhorn, cornet
- Bob Berg – tenor saxophone
- George Mraz – bass
- Jimmy Cobb – drums
