= Duo (Kenny Drew and Niels-Henning Ørsted Pedersen album) =

Studio album by Kenny Drew and Niels-Henning Ørsted Pedersen
- Released: 1973
- Recorded: April 2, 1973
- Studio: Wifoss Studios, Copenhagen, Denmark
- Genre: Jazz
- Length: 44:56
- Label: SteepleChase; SCS-1002
- Producer: Nils Winther

Kenny Drew chronology
Undercurrent (1960)	Duo (1973)	Everything I Love (1973)

Niels-Henning Ørsted Pedersen chronology
Duo (1973)	The Trio (1973)

Professional ratings
Review scores
Source	Rating
AllMusic	4/5 stars
The Rolling Stone Jazz Record Guide	4/5 stars
The Penguin Guide to Jazz Recordings	3/4 stars

Duo is an album by pianist Kenny Drew and bassist Niels-Henning Ørsted Pedersen recorded in 1973 and released on the SteepleChase label.

On first pressings of the original vinyl edition of this recording, the first and last titles on the first side (tracks 1 and 6 as listed below) are switched on the back cover track listing, but are correct on the labels.

== Reception ==
The AllMusic review awarded the album 4 stars.

== Track listing ==
All compositions by Kenny Drew except as indicated

1. "I Skovens Dybe Stille Ro" (Traditional) – 2:49
2. "Come Summer" – 3:12
3. "Lullabye" (Niels-Henning Ørsted Pedersen) – 0:50
4. "Kristine" (Pedersen) – 5:26
5. "Serenity" – 4:36
6. "Det Var en Lørdag Aften" (Traditional) – 3:41
7. "Do You Know What It Means to Miss New Orleans?" (Louis Alter, Eddie DeLange) – 4:09
8. "Wave" (Antonio Carlos Jobim) – 5:22
9. "Duo Trip" – 2:36
10. "Hush-A-Bye" (Traditional) – 7:56
11. "I Skovens Dybe Stille Ro" [alternate take] (Traditional) – 2:46 Bonus track on CD

== Personnel ==
- Kenny Drew – piano
- Niels-Henning Ørsted Pedersen – bass
