= Havin' Myself a Time =

Studio album by Kim Parker and The Kenny Drew Trio
- Released: 1982
- Recorded: November 24–25, 1981
- Studio: Barigozzi Studios, Milano, Italy
- Genre: Jazz
- Length: 40:24
- Label: Soul Note; SN 1033
- Producer: Giovanni Bonandrini

Kenny Drew chronology
| It Might as Well Be Spring (1981) | Havin' Myself a Time (1982) | Your Soft Eyes (1981) |

Havin' myself a Time is an album by vocalist Kim Parker with the Kenny Drew Trio recorded in 1981 and released on the Soul Note label.

== Reception ==
Professional ratings
Review scores
| Source | Rating |
|---|---|
| Allmusic | 4.5/5 stars |

The Allmusic review says Parker's "voice is so appealing that it is surprising that she has done so little since... This is her definitive record".

== Track listing ==
1. "Havin' Myself a Time" (Ralph Rainger, Leo Robin) – 5:25
2. "Paris Is a Lonely Town" (Harold Arlen, E. Y. Harburg) – 7:17
3. "A Sleepin' Bee" (Arlen, Truman Capote) – 6:44
4. "Ev'rything I Love" (Cole Porter) – 4:38
5. "The Underdog" (Al Cohn, Dave Frishberg) – 5:35
6. "Rain Go Away" (Phil Woods) – 5:05
7. "Azure" (Duke Ellington, Irving Mills) – 5:40

== Personnel ==
- Kim Parker – vocals
- Kenny Drew – piano
- Mads Vinding – bass
- Ed Thigpen – drums
