= Go (Paul Chambers album) =

Studio album by Paul Chambers
- Released: 1959
- Recorded: February 2 & 3, 1959
- Studio: Universal Recording; Chicago, Illinois, U.S.
- Genre: Jazz
- Length: 39:28 Original LP
- Label: Vee-Jay; VJLP 1014
- Producer: Sid McCoy

Paul Chambers chronology
Paul Chambers Quintet (1958)	Go (1959)	1st Bassman (1960)

Go is an album by jazz bassist Paul Chambers recorded in Chicago in 1959 and released by the Vee-Jay label. Featured musicians include trumpeter Freddie Hubbard, alto saxophonist Cannonball Adderley, pianist Wynton Kelly and drummer Philly Joe Jones. The album was re-released in 1997 as a double CD featuring additional recordings and alternate takes from the sessions and included as part of the Mosaic Box Set The Complete Vee Jay Paul Chambers/Wynton Kelly Sessions 1959-61 in 2000.

== Critical reception ==
Professional ratings
Review scores
Source	Rating
AllMusic	4/5 stars
DownBeat	3/5 stars
The Penguin Guide to Jazz Recordings	3/4 stars

AllMusic reviewer Michael G. Nastos stated "The first of two Vee Jay label dates by the acclaimed modern jazz bassist Paul Chambers is a fine exercise in hard bop, split between showcasing his compositions and famous standards. Alto saxophonist Cannonball Adderley and trumpeter Freddie Hubbard are on the front line, perhaps for the only time in their storied careers, and work well for the most part ... The advantage in buying this reissue is that the second CD is comprised exclusively of outtakes from the originally issued tracks, and many of them have extended solos ... Chambers died far too young ten years hence in January of 1969, but left behind a memorable 15-year legacy, well represented by this recording where he was in his early prime". Reviewing The Complete Vee Jay Paul Chambers/Wynton Kelly Sessions 1959-61 for All About Jazz C. Michael Hovan said "This hard bop delight is notable for a front line that includes trumpeter Freddie Hubbard, new on the scene at the time, and Cannonball Adderley. Wynton Kelly, Chambers, and Jimmy Cobb were the rhythm team for Miles Davis at the time and their empathetic teamwork was responsible for elevating many a blowing date of the time above the mean standard". In JazzTimes Harvey Pekar wrote "Hubbard makes one of his earliest recorded appearances, but his style already is quite original, although it would continue to evolve. His long lines and harmonic daring indicate that John Coltrane had a strong impact on him, as well as Clifford Brown. Technically he’s brilliant, and plays with a big, brassy tone and command in all registers. Like Hubbard, Adderley is impressive, contributing hard swinging, imaginative spots".

== Track listing ==
All compositions by Paul Chambers except where noted

=== Original LP ===
1. "Awful Mean" (Cannonball Adderley) – 6:56
2. "Just Friends" (John Klenner, Sam M. Lewis) – 5:14
3. "Julie Ann" – 6:01
4. "There Is No Greater Love" (Isham Jones, Marty Symes) – 8:14
5. "Ease It" – 6:57
6. "I Got Rhythm" (George Gershwin, Ira Gershwin) – 6:06

=== 1998 CD Reissue ===
Disc One:

1. "Awful Mean" (Adderley) – 6:56
2. "Julie Ann" – 5:57
3. "There Is No Greater Love" (Jones, Symes) – 8:14
4. "I Heard That (aka F Blues)" – 9:30 previously unreleased
5. "Dear Ann" – 4:08 previously unreleased
6. "Shades of Blue (aka Who's Blues)" (Adderley) – 8:23 previously unreleased
7. "Just Friends" (Klenner, Lewis) – 5:12
8. "Ease It" – 6:57
9. "I Got Rhythm" (George Gershwin, Ira Gershwin) – 6:06

Disc Two:

1. "Awful Mean" [take 4] – 9:25 previously unreleased
2. "I Heard That" [remake take 1] – 9:20 previously unreleased
3. "I Heard That" [take 8] – 9:10 previously unreleased
4. "Dear Ann" [remake take 2] – 5:08 previously unreleased
5. "Dear Ann" [take 3] – 7:48 previously unreleased
6. "Just Friends" [take 6] (Klenner, Lewis) – 7:32 previously unreleased
7. "I Got Rhythm" [take 2] (Gershwin, Gershwin) – 6:25 previously unreleased

== Personnel ==
- Paul Chambers – bass
- Freddie Hubbard – trumpet
- Cannonball Adderley – alto saxophone
- Wynton Kelly – piano
- Philly Joe Jones (LP tracks 1, 3 & 4; CD 1 tracks 1–6 and CD 2 tracks 1–5), Jimmy Cobb (LP tracks 2, 5 & 6; CD 1 tracks 7–9 and CD 2 tracks 6 & 7) – drums
