= Paul Bley/NHØP =

Studio album by Paul Bley and Niels-Henning Ørsted Pedersen
- Released: 1973
- Recorded: June 24 and July 1, 1973
- Studio: Copenhagen, Denmark
- Genre: Jazz
- Length: 45:58
- Label: SteepleChase SCS 1005
- Producer: Nils Winther

Paul Bley chronology
Paul Bley & Scorpio (1973)	Paul Bley/NHØP (1973)	Jaco (1974)

Niels-Henning Ørsted Pedersen chronology
The Trio (1973)	Paul Bley/NHØP (1973)	Duo 2 (1974)

Paul Bley/NHØP is a jazz duet album by Paul Bley and Niels-Henning Ørsted Pedersen, released on SteepleChase Records in 1973. The album was recorded in Copenhagen, Denmark in June and July 1973, and primarily features Bley's compositions. Bley's performance here is more extroverted than on some of his other recordings.

== Reception ==
Professional ratings
Review scores
Source	Rating
Allmusic	4/5 stars
The Penguin Guide to Jazz Recordings	3/4 stars

The Allmusic review awarded the album 4 stars calling it a "glorious, heady, and intimate album".

== Track listing ==
All compositions by Paul Bley except as indicated

1. "Meeting" - 6:03
2. "Mating of Urgency" - 4:51
3. "Carla" - 4:21
4. "Olhos de Gato" (Carla Bley) - 5:33
5. "Paradise Island" - 2:20
6. "Upstairs" - 3:07
7. "Later" - 5:23
8. "Summer" - 4:06
9. "Gesture Without Plot" (Annette Peacock) - 5:33
- Tracks 1–3 and 7–9 recorded on June 24, 1973. Tracks 4–6 recorded on July 1, 1973.

== Personnel ==
- Paul Bley: piano
- Niels-Henning Ørsted Pedersen: bass
