= Sweet Sundown =

Studio album by Jason Blaine
- Released: March 30, 2010
- Genre: Country
- Length: 41:18
- Label: E1 Entertainment

Jason Blaine chronology
Make My Move (2008)	Sweet Sundown (2010)	Life So Far (2011)

Singles from Sweet Sundown
- 1. "Numb" Released: January 4, 2010; 2. "Run with Me" Released: May 10, 2010; 3. "Hillbilly Girl" Released: September 20, 2010

Sweet Sundown is the third studio album by Canadian country music artist Jason Blaine. It was released on March 30, 2010, by E1 Entertainment. Blaine wrote or co-wrote ten of the album's eleven tracks, including "Home Is a Highway," a collaboration with Steve Wariner. "When You Love Someone" was previously recorded by Bryan Adams on his 1997 album MTV Unplugged.

== Track listing ==
No.	Title	Length
1.	"Run with Me"	4:16
2.	"Numb"	3:27
3.	"Every Sweet Sundown"	2:53
4.	"Up in Smoke"	3:37
5.	"Pictures"	3:51
6.	"Hillbilly Girl"	3:13
7.	"Hit It Hard"	3:07
8.	"Me and the Sun"	4:19
9.	"When You Love Someone"	3:42
10.	"Home Is a Highway" (featuring Steve Wariner)	4:53
11.	"Heroes"	4:00

== Chart performance ==
=== Singles ===
Year	Single	Peak positions
Year	Single	CAN
2010	"Numb"	—
2010	"Run with Me"	99
2010	"Hillbilly Girl"	—
"—" denotes releases that did not chart
