= Talkin' & Walkin' =

Studio album by Kenny Drew
- Released: 1956
- Recorded: December 1955
- Studio: Capitol (Hollywood)
- Genre: Jazz
- Length: 70:12
- Label: Jazz: West; JWLP 4

Kenny Drew chronology
Kenny Drew and His Progressive Piano (1953-54)	Talkin' & Walkin' (1956)	Embers Glow (1956)

Professional ratings
Review scores
Source	Rating
Allmusic	3/5 stars

Talkin' & Walkin' is an album by pianist Kenny Drew recorded in 1955 and originally released on the Jazz:West label. The album was rereleased on Pacific Jazz and on CD on Blue Note with three additional live tracks recorded around the same time.

== Reception ==
The Allmusic review states "Excellent modern mainstream music of the mid-'50s".

== Track listing ==
All compositions by Kenny Drew except as indicated

1. "Talkin' Walkin'" – 6:19
2. "In the Prescribed Manner" – 5:06
3. "Prelude to a Kiss" (Duke Ellington, Irving Mills, Mack Gordon) – 5:30
4. "Wee-Dot" (J. J. Johnson, Leo Parker) – 5:45
5. "Hidden Channel" – 4:50
6. "Deadline" – 3:20
7. "I'm Old Fashioned" (Jerome Kern, Johnny Mercer) – 4:57
8. "Minor Blues (Blues in a Cardboard Box)" – 5:42
9. "Walkin' Talkin'" – 5:42
10. "It's Only a Paper Moon" (Harold Arlen, Billy Rose, E.Y. Harburg) – 6:56 Bonus track on CD reissue
11. "Leroy's Blues" – 5:55 Bonus track on CD reissue
12. "Contour" – 7:18 Bonus track on CD reissue
- Recorded at the Forum Theatre in Los Angeles on November 18, 1955 (tracks 10–12) and at Capitol Studios in Los Angeles in December 1955 (tracks 1–9)

== Personnel ==
- Kenny Drew – piano
- Jack Sheldon – trumpet (tracks 10–12)
- Joe Maini – alto saxophone, tenor saxophone
- Leroy Vinnegar – bass
- Lawrence Marable – drums
