= Make My Move =

Studio album by Jason Blaine
- Released: May 20, 2008
- Genre: Country
- Length: 41:26
- Label: Koch
- Producer: Phil O'Donnell; Noah Gordon

Jason Blaine chronology
While We Were Waiting (2005)	Make My Move (2008)	Sweet Sundown (2010)

Singles from Make My Move
- 1. "Rock in My Boot" Released: May 22, 2007; 2. "Flirtin' with Me" Released: October 2007; 3. "My First Car" Released: May 2008; 4. "Good Day to Get Gone" Released: August 2008; 5. "Give It to Me" Released: March 9, 2009

Make My Move is the second studio album by Canadian country music singer-songwriter Jason Blaine. The album was released by Koch on May 20, 2008.

== Track listing ==
No.	Title	Length
1.	"Good Day to Get Gone"	3:58
2.	"Rock in My Boot"	3:19
3.	"Just a Memory"	3:46
4.	"If You Don't Love Me"	3:45
5.	"I Wanna Be That Man"	3:00
6.	"My First Car"	3:16
7.	"Flirtin' with Me"	3:14
8.	"Give It to Me"	3:26
9.	"Make My Move"	3:50
10.	"The Man I Am"	3:26
11.	"If Love Was Enough"	2:48
12.	"Slow Time Down"	3:38

== Chart performance ==
=== Singles ===
Year	Single	Peak positions
Year	Single	CAN
2007	"Rock in My Boot"	92
2007	"Flirtin' with Me"	—
2008	"My First Car"	—
2008	"Good Day to Get Gone"	95
2009	"Give It to Me"	—
"—" denotes releases that did not chart
