= Bass on Top =

Studio album by the Paul Chambers Quartet
- Released: October 1957
- Recorded: July 14, 1957
- Studio: Van Gelder Studio; Hackensack, NJ
- Genre: Jazz
- Length: 41:47
- Label: Blue Note; BLP 1569
- Producer: Alfred Lion

Paul Chambers chronology
Whims of Chambers (1957)	Bass on Top (1957)	Paul Chambers Quintet (1958)

Bass on Top is an album by the Paul Chambers Quartet, recorded on July 14, 1957 and released on Blue Note later that year. The quartet features guitarist Kenny Burrell, pianist Hank Jones and drummer Art Taylor.

== Reception ==
Professional ratings
Review scores
Source	Rating
AllMusic	4.5/5 stars
The Penguin Guide to Jazz Recordings	3.5/4 stars

The AllMusic review by Stephen Thomas Erlewine states, "The result is a warm, entertaining collection of mainstream jazz that nevertheless rewards close listening."

== Track listing ==
Side 1
No.	Title	Writer(s)	Length
1.	"Yesterdays"	Otto Harbach; Jerome Kern	5:53
2.	"You'd Be So Nice to Come Home To"	Cole Porter	7:16
3.	"Chasin' the Bird"	Charlie Parker	6:18

Side 2
No.	Title	Writer(s)	Length
1.	"Dear Old Stockholm"	Traditional	6:44
2.	"The Theme"	Miles Davis	6:15
3.	"Confessin'"	Doc Daugherty; Ellis Reynolds; Al Neiburg	4:13

CD reissue bonus track
No.	Title	Writer(s)	Length
7.	"Chamber Mates"	Burrell; Chambers	5:08

== Personnel ==
=== Paul Chambers Quartet ===
- Kenny Burrell – guitar
- Hank Jones – piano
- Paul Chambers – bass
- Art Taylor – drums

=== Technical personnel ===
- Alfred Lion – producer
- Rudy Van Gelder – recording engineer, mastering
- Harold Feinstein – design
- Francis Wolff – photography
- Robert Levin – liner notes
