= A Harold Arlen Showcase =

Studio album by Kenny Drew
- Released: 1957
- Recorded: February 1957; New York City
- Genre: Jazz
- Length: 33:08
- Label: Judson; L 3005
- Producer: Orrin Keepnews and Bill Grauer, Jr.

Kenny Drew chronology
A Harry Warren Showcase (1957)	A Harold Arlen Showcase (1957)	I Love Jerome Kern (1957)

Professional ratings
Review scores
Source	Rating
Allmusic	4/5 stars

A Harold Arlen Showcase is an album by pianist Kenny Drew recorded in 1957 and released on the Riverside Records subsidiary Judson label. The album was rereleased on CD by Milestone Records as a compilation with its companion album A Harry Warren Showcase as Kenny Drew Plays the Music of Harry Warren and Harold Arlen in 1995.

== Reception ==
The Allmusic review called the compilation "melodic, tasteful and lightly swinging... a nice set if not all that essential".

== Track listing ==
1. "Come Rain or Come Shine" (Harold Arlen, Johnny Mercer) - 2:43
2. "That Old Black Magic" (Arlen, Mercer) - 3:24
3. "Over the Rainbow" (Arlen, E. Y. Harburg) - 3:12
4. "Between the Devil and the Deep Blue Sea" (Arlen, Ted Koehler) - 2:20
5. "As Long as I Live" (Arlen, Koehler) - 2:48
6. "It's Only a Paper Moon" (Arlen, Harburg, Billy Rose) - 2:15
7. "Stormy Weather" (Arlen, Koehler) - 3:00
8. "I've Got the World on a String" (Arlen, Koehler) - 2:19
9. "Let's Fall in Love" (Arlen, Koehler) - 2:36
10. "Ill Wind" (Arlen, Koehler) - 3:02
11. "Blues in the Night" (Arlen, Mercer) - 2:42
12. "Get Happy" (Arlen, Koehler) - 2:47

== Personnel ==
- Kenny Drew - piano
- Wilbur Ware - bass
