= Kenny Drew =

American-Danish jazz pianist (1928–1993)

Background information
- Born: Kenneth Sidney Drew; August 28, 1928; New York City, U.S.
- Died: August 4, 1993 (aged 64) Copenhagen, Denmark
- Genres: Jazz; hard bop; post-bop; mainstream jazz
- Occupation: Musician
- Instrument: Piano
- Years active: 1950–1993
- Labels: Blue Note; Xanadu; SteepleChase; Riverside; Verve; Soul Note; Storyville

Kenneth Sidney "Kenny" Drew (August 28, 1928 – August 4, 1993) was an American-Danish jazz pianist.

== Biography ==
Drew was born on August 28, 1928, in New York City, United States, and he received piano lessons from the age of five. He attended the High School of Music & Art in Manhattan. His first recording, in 1950, was with trumpeter Howard McGhee, and over the next two years Drew worked in bands led by Buddy DeFranco, Coleman Hawkins, Lester Young, and Charlie Parker, among others.

After a brief period with his own trio in California, Drew returned to New York, playing with Dinah Washington, Johnny Griffin, Buddy Rich, and several others over the following few years. He led many recording sessions throughout the 1950s, also appearing on John Coltrane's 1958 album Blue Train.

Drew was one of the American jazz musicians who settled in Europe around this period: he moved to Paris, France, in 1961 and to Copenhagen, Denmark, three years later. While he sacrificed much of the interest of the American jazz audience, he gained a wide following across Europe. Drew was a well-known figure on the Copenhagen jazz scene, recording many sessions with the Danish bassist Niels-Henning Ørsted Pedersen. "Living in Copenhagen, and travelling out from there," Drew remarked, "I have probably worked in more different contexts than if I had stayed in New York where I might have got musically locked in with a set-group of musicians. This way, I have been able to keep my musical antennas in shape, while at the same time I have had more time to study and also get deeper into my own endeavors."

Drew and Dexter Gordon appeared on screen in Ole Ege's theatrically released hardcore pornographic film Pornografi – en musical (1971), for which they composed and performed the score.

Drew died in August 1993 in Copenhagen, Denmark, (he had stomach cancer, but it was unclear if this was the cause of death) and was interred in the Assistens Cemetery in Nørrebro, Copenhagen. A street is named after him in southern Copenhagen: "Kenny Drews Vej" (lit. 'Kenny Drew's Road').

His son, Kenny Drew Jr., was also a jazz pianist.

== Playing style ==
Drew's style was described in The Biographical Encyclopedia of Jazz as "precise" and his playing as being a combination of bebop-influenced melodic improvisation and block chords, including "refreshingly subtle harmonizations".

== Discography ==
=== As leader/co-leader ===
| Recording date | Title | Label | Year released | Notes |
|---|---|---|---|---|
| 1953–04 | New Faces, New Sounds | Blue Note | 1953 | Trio, with Curly Russell (bass), Art Blakey (drums) |
| 1953, 1954–09 | Kenny Drew and His Progressive Piano | Norgran | 1954 | One track solo piano; some tracks trio with Gene Wright (bass), Lawrence Marable (drums); some tracks trio with Wright (bass), Charles "Specs" Wright (drums); also released as The Modernity of Kenny Drew; contains tracks originally released on The Ideation of Kenny Drew |
| 1955–12 | Talkin' & Walkin' | Jazz:West | 1956 | Quartet, with Joe Maini (alto sax, tenor sax), Leroy Vinnegar (bass), Lawrence Marable (drums) |
| 1956–09 | Kenny Drew Trio | Riverside | 1956 | Trio, with Paul Chambers (bass), Philly Joe Jones (drums) |
| 1957–02 | A Harry Warren Showcase | Judson | 1957 | Duo, with Wilbur Ware (bass) |
| 1957–02 | A Harold Arlen Showcase | Judson | 1957 | Duo, with Wilbur Ware (bass) |
| 1957–02 | I Love Jerome Kern | Riverside | 1957 | Duo, with Wilbur Ware (bass) |
| 1957–03, 1957–04 | This Is New | Riverside | 1957 | Some tracks quartet, with Donald Byrd (trumpet), Wilbur Ware (bass), G.T. Hogan (drums); most tracks quintet, with Hank Mobley (tenor sax) added |
| 1957–10 | Pal Joey | Riverside | 1958 | Trio, with Wilbur Ware (bass), Philly Joe Jones (drums) |
| 1960–12 | Undercurrent | Blue Note | 1961 | Quintet, with Freddie Hubbard (trumpet), Hank Mobley (tenor sax), Sam Jones (bass), Louis Hayes (drums) |
| 1973–04 | Duo | SteepleChase | 1973 | Duo, with Niels-Henning Ørsted Pedersen (bass) |
| 1973–10, 1973–12 | Everything I Love | SteepleChase | 1974 | Solo piano |
| 1974–02 | Duo 2 | SteepleChase | 1974 | Duo, with Niels-Henning Ørsted Pedersen (bass) |
| 1974–05 | Dark Beauty | SteepleChase | 1974 | Trio, with Niels-Henning Ørsted Pedersen (bass), Albert Heath (drums) |
| 1974–05 | If You Could See Me Now | SteepleChase | 1975 | Trio, with Niels-Henning Ørsted Pedersen (bass), Albert Heath (drums) |
| 1974–07 | Duo Live in Concert | SteepleChase | 1975 | Duo, with Niels-Henning Ørsted Pedersen (bass); in concert |
| 1975–09 | Morning | SteepleChase | 1976 | Trio, with Niels-Henning Ørsted Pedersen (bass), Philip Catherine (guitar) |
| 1977–02 | In Concert | SteepleChase | 1979 | Trio, with Niels-Henning Ørsted Pedersen (bass), Philip Catherine (guitar); in concert |
| 1977–02 | Lite Flite | SteepleChase | 1977 | Quintet, with Thad Jones (flugelhorn, cornet), Bob Berg (tenor sax), George Mraz (bass), Jimmy Cobb (drums) |
| 1977–08 | Ruby, My Dear | SteepleChase | 1980 | Trio, with David Friesen (bass), Clifford Jarvis (drums) |
| 1978–10 | Home Is Where the Soul Is | Xanadu | 1978 | Trio, with Leroy Vinnegar (bass guitar), Frank Butler (drums) |
| 1978–10 | For Sure! | Xanadu | 1978 | Quintet, with Charles McPherson (alto sax), Sam Noto (trumpet), Leroy Vinnegar (bass), Frank Butler (drums) |
| 1980–11 | Afternoon In Europe | Baystate | 1983 | Trio, with Niels-Henning Ørsted Pedersen (bass), Ed Thigpen (drums) |
| 1981–01 | All The Things You Are | Lob | 1981 | Quartet, with Junior Cook(tenor sax), Sam Jones (bass), Jimmy Cobb (drums); in concert |
| 1981–11 | It Might as Well Be Spring | Soul Note | 1982 | Solo piano |
| 1981–11 | Your Soft Eyes | Soul Note | 1982 | Trio, with Mads Vinding (bass), Ed Thigpen (drums) |
| 1982–03 | Playtime: Children's Songs by Kenny Drew and Mads Vinding | Metronome | 1982 | Duo, with Mads Vinding (bass) |
| 1982–03 | The Lullaby | Baystate | 1982 | Trio, with Niels-Henning Ørsted Pedersen (bass), Ed Thigpen (drums) |
| 1982–09 | Moonlit Desert | Baystate | 1982 | With Niels-Henning Ørsted Pedersen (bass), Ed Thigpen (drums), The Almost Big Band |
| 1983–01 | Swingin' Love | Baystate | 1983 | Trio, with Niels-Henning Ørsted Pedersen (bass), Ed Thigpen (drums) |
| 1983–02 | And Far Away | Soul Note | 1983 | Quartet, with Philip Catherine (guitar), Niels-Henning Ørsted Pedersen (bass), Barry Altschul (drums) |
| 1983–06 | Fantasia | Baystate | 1987 | Trio, with Niels-Henning Ørsted Pedersen (bass), Ed Thigpen (drums) |
| 1984–05 | Trippin' | Baystate | 1984 | Trio, with Niels-Henning Ørsted Pedersen (bass), Ed Thigpen (drums) |
| 1985–08 | By Request | Baystate | 1985 | Trio, with Niels-Henning Ørsted Pedersen (bass), Ed Thigpen (drums) |
| 1985–08 | By Request II | Baystate | 1986 | Trio, with Niels-Henning Ørsted Pedersen (bass), Ed Thigpen (drums) |
| 1986–06 | Elegy | Baystate | 1987 | Trio, with Niels-Henning Ørsted Pedersen (bass), Ed Thigpen (drums) |
| 1987–06 | Dream | Baystate | 1987 | Trio, with Niels-Henning Ørsted Pedersen (bass), Ed Thigpen (drums) |
| 1988–08 | Impressions | Alfa | 1988 | Trio, with Niels-Henning Ørsted Pedersen (bass), Alvin Queen (drums) |
| 1989–05 | Recollections | Alfa | 1989 | Trio, with Niels-Henning Ørsted Pedersen (bass), Alvin Queen (drums) |
| 1990–03 | New York Stories | Alfa | 1990 | Quartet, with Hank Jones (piano), Mads Vinding (bass), Billy Hart (drums) |
| 1990–05 | Expressions | Alfa | 1990 | Trio, with Niels-Henning Ørsted Pedersen (bass), Alvin Queen (drums) |
| 1990–10 | The First & The Last also released as The Falling Leaves (2021) | Baybridge | 1997 | Trio, with George Mraz (bass), Lewis Nash (drums) |
| 1991–01 | Standards Request Live at the Keystone Korner Tokyo (Vol.1 & Vol.2) | Alfa | 1998 | Trio, with Niels-Henning Ørsted Pedersen (bass), Alvin Queen (drums); in concert |
| 1991–01, 1991-02 | Plays Standards Live "Autumn Leaves" | Alfa | 1991 | Trio, with Niels-Henning Ørsted Pedersen (bass), Alvin Queen (drums); in concert |
| 1992–05 | Piano Night | Pony Canyon | 1992 | Trio, with Niels-Henning Ørsted Pedersen (bass), Alvin Queen (drums); in concert |
| 1992–06 | Cleopatra's Dream | Alfa | 1992 | Trio, with Niels-Henning Ørsted Pedersen (bass), Alvin Queen (drums) |
| 1992–07 | At the Brewhouse | Storyville | 1992 | Trio, with Niels-Henning Ørsted Pedersen (bass), Alvin Queen (drums); in concert |
| 1992–10 | Plays Standards Live At The Blue Note Osaka | Alfa | 1992 | Trio, with Niels-Henning Ørsted Pedersen (bass), Alvin Queen (drums); in concert |
| 1992–10 | The Last Recording; Live At The Blue Note Osaka | Alfa | 1992 | Trio, with Niels-Henning Ørsted Pedersen (bass), Alvin Queen (drums); in concert |

Compilation

- Solo-Duo (Storyville, 1996) – rec. 1966–83

=== As sideman ===
With Tina Brooks

- Back to the Tracks (Blue Note, 1998) – rec. 1960
- The Waiting Game (Blue Note, 2002) – rec. 1961

With Clifford Brown

- Best Coast Jazz (EmArcy, 1954)
- Clifford Brown All Stars (EmArcy, 1956) – rec. 1954

With John Coltrane

- High Step (Blue Note, 1975) – rec. 1956
- Blue Train (Blue Note, 1958) – rec. 1957

With Kenny Dorham

- Showboat (Time, 1960)
- Whistle Stop (Blue Note, 1961) – rec. 1960

With Art Farmer

- Farmer's Market (New Jazz, 1956)
- Manhattan (Soul Note, 1981)

With Dizzy Gillespie

- The Giant (America, 1973)
- The Source (America, 1973)

With Dexter Gordon

- Daddy Plays the Horn (Bethlehem, 1955)
- Dexter Calling... (Blue Note, 1962) – rec. 1961
- One Flight Up (Blue Note, 1965) – rec. 1964
- A Day in Copenhagen (MPS, 1969) also with Slide Hampton
- Some Other Spring (Sonet, 1970) also with Karin Krog
- The Apartment (SteepleChase, 1975)
- Swiss Nights Vol. 1 (SteepleChase, 1976) – rec. 1975
- Swiss Nights Vol. 2 (SteepleChase, 1978) – rec. 1975
- Swiss Nights Vol. 3 (SteepleChase, 1979) – rec. 1975
- Landslide (Blue Note, 1980) – rec. 1961-62
- Both Sides of Midnight (Black Lion, 1981) – rec. 1967
- Body and Soul (Black Lion, 1981) – rec. 1967
- Take the "A" Train (Black Lion, 1988) – rec. 1967
- The Squirrel (Blue Note, 1997) – rec. 1967
- Loose Walk (SteepleChase, 2003) – rec. 1965
- Misty (SteepleChase, 2004) – rec. 1965
- Heartaches (SteepleChase, 2004) – rec. 1965
- Ladybird (SteepleChase, 2005) – rec. 1965
- Stella by Starlight (SteepleChase, 2005) – rec. 1966
- Live in Tokyo 1975 (Elemental Music, 2018) – rec. 1975

With Ken McIntyre

- Hindsight (SteepleChase, 1974)
- Open Horizon (SteepleChase, 1976) – rec. 1965

With Jackie McLean

- Jackie's Bag (Blue Note, 1960) – rec. 1959–60
- Bluesnik (Blue Note, 1962) – rec. 1961
- Live at Montmartre (SteepleChase, 1972)
- A Ghetto Lullaby (SteepleChase, 1974) – rec. 1973
- The Meeting (SteepleChase, 1974) also with Dexter Gordon – rec. 1973
- The Source (SteepleChase, 1974) also with Dexter Gordon – rec. 1973

With Sonny Rollins

- Sonny Rollins with the Modern Jazz Quartet (Prestige, 1951)
- Tour de Force (Prestige, 1956)
- Sonny Boy (Prestige, 1961) – rec. 1956

With Sonny Stitt

- Kaleidoscope (Prestige, 1957) – rec. 1950
- Stitt's Bits (Prestige, 1958) – rec. 1950

With Ben Webster

- First Concert In Denmark – rec. (Storyville, 1965)
- Saturday Night At The Montmartre (Black Lion, 1970) – rec. 1965. reissued as Stormy Weather
- Sunday Morning At The Montmartre (Black Lion, 1977) – rec. 1965. reissued as Gone with the Wind.

Wíth others

- Gene Ammons, Goodbye (Prestige, 1974)
- Svend Asmussen, Prize/Winners (Baystate, 1978)
- Chet Baker, (Chet Baker Sings) It Could Happen to You (Riverside, 1958)
- Art Blakey, Originally (Columbia, 1982)
- Benny Carter, Summer Serenade (Storyville, 1982)
- Paul Chambers, Chambers' Music (Jazz:West, 1956)
- Ted Curson, Plenty of Horn (Old Town, 1961)
- Eddie "Lockjaw" Davis, All of Me (SteepleChase, 1983)
- Teddy Edwards, Out of This World (SteepleChase, 1980)
- Grant Green, Sunday Mornin' (Blue Note, 1962)
- Johnny Griffin, Blues for Harvey (SteepleChase, 1973)
- Ernie Henry, Presenting Ernie Henry (Riverside, 1956)
- Joe Maini, Embers Glow (Jazz:West, 1956)
- Ray Nance, Huffin'n'Puffin' (MPS, 1972)
- Kim Parker, Havin' Myself a Time (Soul Note, 1982)
- Rita Reys, The Cool Voice of Rita Reys (Columbia, 1956)
- Sahib Shihab, Sentiments (Storyville, 1972)
- Toots Thielemans, Man Bites Harmonica! (Riverside, 1958)
- Tiziana Ghiglioni, Sounds of Love (Soul Note, 1983)
