= Chambers' Music =

Studio album by Paul Chambers
- Released: September 1956
- Recorded: March 1 or 2, 1956; Western Recorders, Los Angeles
- Genre: Jazz
- Length: 32:43 original LP
- Labels: Jazz West; JWLP 7
- Producer: Herbert Kimmel

Paul Chambers chronology
Chambers' Music (1956)	Whims of Chambers (1957)

Chambers' Music (subtitled A Jazz Delegation from the East) is the debut album by the jazz bassist Paul Chambers. It was released in September 1956 on the Jazz West label. It features Chambers with his Miles Davis bandmates, tenor saxophonist John Coltrane and drummer Philly Joe Jones, along with pianist Kenny Drew, and baritone saxophonist Pepper Adams and trombonist Curtis Fuller on three tracks.

It is the first record to include a composition by John Coltrane. It was later reissued on Blue Note Records in 1995 on a now out-of-print CD, which also features three bonus tracks that were originally issued on High Step.

== Reception ==
Professional ratings
Review scores
Source	Rating
AllMusic	3/5 stars
Jazzwise	3/5 stars

In a review for AllMusic, Scott Yanow awarded the album three stars, commenting: "Although none of this music is classic, it does give listeners a valuable early look at these important jazzmen." Regarding the recording session, Tony Hall of Jazzwise remarked: "It was a blowing session not unlike the Bob Weinstock dates for Prestige, recorded when the Miles Davis Quintet was in California, with Drew in on the date for Red Garland... The session only lasted two hours, so several of these titles were probably first – and only – takes... Philly Joe, who is in top form on both sessions, helps Chambers bring out spirited solos from the horns, especially Fuller, whose first date this was. This CD shows Trane still in the process of sorting out his personal direction and precedes the Quintet's marathon Prestige sessions (Relaxin' etc) with Miles a few months later the same year."

== Track listing ==
1. "Dexterity" (Parker) - 6:46
2. "Stablemates" (Golson) - 5:53
3. "Easy to Love" (Porter) - 3:51
4. "Visitation" (Chambers) - 4:55
5. "John Paul Jones" (John Coltrane) - 6:56
6. "Eastbound" (Drew) - 4:22

Bonus tracks on Blue Note CD reissue:

7. "Trane's Strain" — 11:05
8. "High Step" (Harris) — 8:13
9. "Nixon, Dixon and Yates Blues" — 8:28

Tracks 7, 8, 9 recorded on April 20, 1956 in Cambridge, Massachusetts.

== Personnel ==
- Paul Chambers — bass
- Kenny Drew — piano
- John Coltrane — tenor saxophone
- Philly Joe Jones — drums
- Pepper Adams — baritone saxophone (tracks 7, 8 & 9)
- Curtis Fuller — trombone (tracks 7, 8 & 9)
- Roland Alexander — piano (track 7)
