= Chet's Choice =

Studio album by Chet Baker Trio featuring Philip Catherine
- Released: 1985
- Recorded: June 6 & 25, 1985
- Studio: Studio 44, Monster, Holland
- Genre: Jazz
- Length: 63:52 CD release with bonus tracks
- Label: Criss Cross Jazz; 1016
- Producer: Gerry Teekens

Chet Baker chronology
I Remember You (1984)	Chet's Choice (1985)	Strollin' (1985)

Chet's Choice is an album by trumpeter/vocalist Chet Baker which was recorded in 1985 and released on the Dutch Criss Cross Jazz label.

== Reception ==
Professional ratings
Review scores
Source	Rating
Allmusic	4/5 stars
The Penguin Guide to Jazz Recordings	4/4 stars

The Allmusic review by Scott Yanow states "One of the best settings for trumpeter Chet Baker was when he was accompanied by a guitar-bass duo. ... This is one of Baker's better albums from his later period".

== Track listing ==
1. "If I Should Lose You" (Ralph Rainger, Leo Robin) – 4:37
2. "Sad Walk" (Bob Zieff) – 5:30
3. "How Deep Is the Ocean?" (Irving Berlin) – 6:20
4. "Doodlin'" (Horace Silver) – 4:48
5. "My Foolish Heart" (Victor Young, Ned Washington) – 9:30 Bonus track on CD release
6. "Conception" (George Shearing) – 4:40
7. "Love for Sale" (Cole Porter) – 9:08
8. "Adriano" (Philip Catherine) – 4:02
9. "Blues in the Closet" (Oscar Pettiford) – 6:36 Bonus track on CD release
10. "Stella by Starlight" (Young, Washington) – 7:30 Bonus track on CD release

== Personnel ==
- Chet Baker – trumpet, vocals
- Philip Catherine – guitar
- Hein van de Geijn (tracks 8–10), Jean-Louis Rassinfosse (tracks 1–7) – bass
