= Duo Live in Concert =

Live album by Kenny Drew and Niels-Henning Ørsted Pedersen
- Released: 1975
- Recorded: June 8, 1974
- Venue: Het Hoogt, Utrecht, the Netherlands
- Genre: Jazz
- Length: 70:13
- Label: SteepleChase; SCS-1031
- Producer: Nils Winther

Kenny Drew chronology
If You Could See Me Now (1974)	Duo Live in Concert (1975)	Morning (1975)

Niels-Henning Ørsted Pedersen chronology
Two's Company (1974)	Duo Live in Concert (1974)	Jaywalkin' (1975)

Professional ratings
Review scores
Source	Rating
Allmusic	3/5 stars
The Penguin Guide to Jazz Recordings	3/4 stars

Duo Live in Concert is a live album by pianist Kenny Drew and bassist Niels-Henning Ørsted Pedersen recorded in the Netherlands in 1974 and released on the SteepleChase label.

== Reception ==
The Allmusic review awarded the album 3 stars.

== Track listing ==
1. "In Your Own Sweet Way" (Dave Brubeck) - 9:44
2. "My Little Suede Shoes" (Charlie Parker) - 5:26
3. "You Don't Know What Love Is" (Gene DePaul, Don Raye) - 6:15 Bonus track on CD
4. "My Shining Hour" (Harold Arlen, Johnny Mercer) - 8:45
5. "Viking's Blues" (Niels-Henning Ørsted Pedersen) - 5:50
6. "Oleo" (Sonny Rollins) - 0:36 Bonus track on CD
7. "Do You Know What It Means to Miss New Orleans?" (Louis Alter, Eddie DeLange) - 6:35 Bonus track on CD
8. "Serenity" (Kenny Drew) - 4:27
9. "All Blues" (Miles Davis) - 6:04 Bonus track on CD
10. "Trubbel" (Olle Adolphson) - 5:00
11. "There Is No Greater Love" (Isham Jones, Marty Symes) - 9:21
12. "Oleo" (Rollins) - 2:14

== Personnel ==
- Kenny Drew - piano
- Niels-Henning Ørsted Pedersen - bass
