= In Concert (Kenny Drew album) =

Live album by Kenny Drew
- Released: 1979
- Recorded: February 3, 1977
- Studio: Kaiserlautern, West Germany
- Genre: Jazz
- Length: 65:19
- Label: SteepleChase
- Producer: Nils Winther

Kenny Drew chronology
Morning (1975)	In Concert (1979)	Lite Flite (1977)

Professional ratings
Review scores
Source	Rating
AllMusic	3/5 stars
The Penguin Guide to Jazz Recordings	3/4 stars

In Concert is a live album by pianist Kenny Drew with guitarist Philip Catherine and bassist Niels-Henning Ørsted Pedersen recorded in West Germany in 1977 and released by SteepleChase.

== Reception ==
The AllMusic review awarded the album 3 stars stating "This live trio date with the superb bassist Niels Pedersen and guitarist Phillip Catherine is worth looking for."

== Track listing ==
1. "Django" (John Lewis) – 15:12 Bonus track on CD
2. "Here's That Rainy Day" (Johnny Burke, Jimmy Van Heusen) – 12:12
3. "Sunset" (Kenny Drew) – 5:31 Bonus track on CD
4. "Twice a Week" (Philip Catherine) – 14:13
5. "Blues in the Closet" (Oscar Pettiford) – 8:21
6. "On Green Dolphin Street" (Bronisław Kaper, Ned Washington) – 9:50

== Personnel ==
- Kenny Drew – piano
- Philip Catherine – guitar
- Niels-Henning Ørsted Pedersen – bass
