= Life So Far =

Studio album by Jason Blaine
- Released: September 27, 2011
- Genre: Country
- Length: 36:17
- Label: E1 Entertainment

Jason Blaine chronology
| Sweet Sundown (2010) | Life So Far (2011) | Everything I Love (2013) |

Singles from Life So Far
- 1. "Watchin' the World Go Round" Released: April 18, 2011; 2. "They Don't Make 'Em Like That Anymore" Released: August 29, 2011; 3. "Cool" Released: April 9, 2012; 4. "On a Night Like This" Released: September 2012

Life So Far is the fourth studio album by Canadian country music artist Jason Blaine. It was released on September 27, 2011 by E1 Entertainment. It includes the single "They Don't Make 'Em Like That Anymore."

== Track listing ==
| No. | Title | Length |
|---|---|---|
| 1. | "Life So Far" | 4:11 |
| 2. | "On a Night Like This" | 3:31 |
| 3. | "They Don't Make 'Em Like That Anymore" | 3:43 |
| 4. | "Cool" | 3:08 |
| 5. | "You Can" | 3:21 |
| 6. | "Come On Kiss Me" | 3:49 |
| 7. | "I'll Wait" (featuring Kathleen Higgins) | 3:38 |
| 8. | "Ain't It Just Like Love" | 3:23 |
| 9. | "'Til the Sun Burns Out" | 4:04 |
| 10. | "Watchin' the World Go Round" | 3:29 |

== Chart performance ==
=== Singles ===
| Year | Single | Peak positions |
| Year | Single | CAN |
|---|---|---|
| 2011 | "Watchin' the World Go Round" | — |
| 2011 | "They Don’t Make 'Em Like That Anymore" | — |
| 2012 | "Cool" | 79 |
| 2012 | "On a Night Like This" | — |
"—" denotes releases that did not chart
