= Country Side =

Studio album by Jason Blaine
- Released: October 23, 2015
- Genre: Country
- Length: 44:23
- Label: E1 Entertainment
- Producers: Jason Blaine; Phil O'Donnell

Jason Blaine chronology
Everything I Love (2013)	Country Side (2015)	Diamonds in the Desert (2022)

Singles from Country Side
- 1. "Country Side" Released: January 5, 2015; 2. "Travelin' Light" Released: June 22, 2015; 3. "Spotlight" Released: September 11, 2015; 4. "Dance with My Daughter" Released: April 8, 2016; 5. "Back to You" Released: July 19, 2016

Country Side is the sixth studio album by Canadian country music artist Jason Blaine. It was released on October 23, 2015 via E1 Entertainment. It include the singles "Country Side", "Travelin' Light", "Spotlight", "Dance with My Daughter" and "Back to You".

== Track listing ==
No.	Title	Length
1.	"Country Side"	3:16
2.	"Travelin' Light"	3:30
3.	"Spotlight"	4:36
4.	"Back to You"	3:08
5.	"Getaway"	3:16
6.	"Arms Around"	3:30
7.	"Sugar Ridge"	3:25
8.	"Cover Band"	3:33
9.	"Night Falls"	3:06
10.	"Heaven Comin' Down"	3:09
11.	"We Were That Song"	3:08
12.	"Dance with My Daughter"	3:35
13.	"Play with My Son (Carter's Song)"	3:11
Total length:		44:23

== Chart performance ==
=== Singles ===
Year	Single	Peak chart positions	
Year	Single	CAN Country	CAN
2015	"Country Side"	6	86
2015	"Travelin' Light"	—	—
2015	"Spotlight"	11	—
2016	"Dance with My Daughter"	43	—
2016	"Back to You"^{A}		
"—" denotes releases that did not chart

- ^{A}Current single.
