= Your Soft Eyes =

Studio album by Kenny Drew
- Released: 1982
- Recorded: November 25–26, 1981
- Studio: Barigozzi Studios, Milano, Italy
- Genre: Jazz
- Length: 40:05
- Label: Soul Note; SN 1031
- Producer: Giovanni Bonandrini

Kenny Drew chronology
Havin' Myself a Time (1981)	Your Soft Eyes (1982)	Playtime: Children's Songs Played by Kenny Drew and Mads Vinding (1974)

Professional ratings
Review scores
Source	Rating
AllMusic	4/5 stars
The Penguin Guide to Jazz Recordings	3/4 stars
The Rolling Stone Jazz Record Guide	3/5 stars

Your Soft Eyes is an album by American jazz pianist Kenny Drew, recorded in 1981 and released on the Soul Note label.

== Reception ==
The AllMusic review stated that "it is well worth tracking down".

== Track listing ==
All compositions by Kenny Drew except as indicated

1. "Forgotten But Not Gone" - 3:52
2. "Alone Together" (Howard Dietz, Arthur Schwartz) - 9:50
3. "Your Soft Eyes" - 5:06
4. "Evening in the Park" - 5:18
5. "How Are Things in Glocca Morra?" (E. Y. Harburg, Burton Lane) - 7:36
6. "Mads' Blues" - 8:23

== Personnel ==
- Kenny Drew - piano
- Mads Vinding - bass
- Ed Thigpen - drums
