= Paul Chambers Quintet =

Studio album by the Paul Chambers Quintet
- Released: April 1958
- Recorded: May 19, 1957
- Studio: Van Gelder Studio; Hackensack, New Jersey
- Genre: Jazz
- Length: 41:24
- Label: Blue Note; BLP 1564
- Producer: Alfred Lion

Paul Chambers chronology
Bass on Top (1957)	Paul Chambers Quintet (1958)	Go (1959)

Paul Chambers Quintet is the fourth studio album by the American jazz bassist Paul Chambers. It was released through Blue Note Records in April 1958. The recording took place on May 19, 1957. The quintet features trumpeter Donald Byrd, tenor saxophonist Clifford Jordan, pianist Tommy Flanagan and drummer Elvin Jones.

== Reception ==
Professional ratings
Review scores
Source	Rating
AllMusic	4/5 stars

The AllMusic review by Steve Leggett awarded the album 4 stars stating: "Nothing is particularly innovative with this set, but these tracks don't push or pull against themselves, either, and there's a clear joy coming off of the floor as these musicians, all in the early phases of their careers, do what they do with comforting assurance."

== Track listing ==
All compositions by Paul Chambers, except where noted.

=== Side 1 ===
1. "Minor Run-Down" (Benny Golson) – 7:36
2. "The Hand of Love" – 6:22
3. "Softly, as in a Morning Sunrise" (Oscar Hammerstein II, Sigmund Romberg) – 3:06

=== Side 2 ===
1. "Four Strings" (Golson) – 5:26
2. "What's New?" (Johnny Burke, Bob Haggart) – 5:38
3. "Beauteous" – 8:05

=== CD reissue bonus track ===
7. "Four Strings" (alternate take) (Golson) – 5:11

== Personnel ==
=== Paul Chambers Quintet ===
- Donald Byrd – trumpet (except "Softly, as in a Morning Sunrise")
- Clifford Jordan – tenor saxophone (except "Softly, as in a Morning Sunrise")
- Tommy Flanagan – piano
- Paul Chambers – bass
- Elvin Jones – drums

=== Technical personnel ===
- Alfred Lion – producer
- Rudy Van Gelder – recording engineer
- Tom Hannan – design
- Robert Levin – liner notes
