= New Faces – New Sounds =

Studio album by Kenny Drew Trio
- Released: 1953
- Recorded: April 16, 1953
- Studios: Van Gelder Studio; Hackensack, New Jersey
- Genre: Jazz
- Length: 27:21
- Labels: Blue Note; BLP 5023
- Producer: Alfred Lion

Kenny Drew chronology
New Faces – New Sounds (1953)	Kenny Drew and His Progressive Piano (1954)

New Faces – New Sounds is the debut ten-inch LP by American jazz pianist Kenny Drew, recorded on April 16, 1953 and released on Blue Note later that year.

== Track listing ==
=== Side 1 ===
1. "Yesterdays" (Kern, Harbach) – 5:19
2. "Stella by Starlight" (Victor Young) – 2:27
3. "Gloria (Leon René) – 3:31
4. "Be My Love" (Sammy Cahn, Nicholas Brodzsky) – 2:41

=== Side 2 ===
1. "Lover, Come Back to Me" (Romberg, Hammerstein II) – 3:31
2. "Everything Happens to Me" (Adair, Dennis) – 4:41
3. "It Might as Well Be Spring" (Rodgers, Hammerstein II) – 2:47
4. "Drew's Blues" (Drew) – 2:24

== Personnel ==
=== Kenny Drew Trio ===
- Kenny Drew – piano
- Art Blakey – drums
- Curly Russell – bass

=== Technical personnel ===
- Alfred Lion – producer (uncredited)
- Rudy Van Gelder – recording engineer (uncredited)
- Leonard Feather – liner notes
