= This Is New (Kenny Drew album) =

Studio album by Kenny Drew
- Released: 1957
- Recorded: March 28 and April 3, 1957
- Studio: Reeves Sound Studios, New York City
- Genre: Jazz
- Length: 42:20
- Label: Riverside; RLP 12-236
- Producer: Orrin Keepnews

Kenny Drew chronology
I Love Jerome Kern (1957)	This Is New (1957)	Pal Joey (1957)

Professional ratings
Review scores
Source	Rating
AllMusic	4/5 stars
The Rolling Stone Jazz Record Guide	3/5 stars
The Penguin Guide to Jazz Recordings	2.5/4 stars

This Is New is an album by pianist Kenny Drew recorded in 1957 and released on the Riverside label.

== Reception ==
The AllMusic review, written by Scott Yanow, gives the album four stars, and states "this session should appeal to straight-ahead bop collectors".

== Track listing ==
1. "This Is New" (Kurt Weill, Ira Gershwin) – 6:56
2. "Carol" (Kenny Drew) – 4:32
3. "It's You or No One" (Jule Styne, Sammy Cahn) – 8:08
4. "You're My Thrill" (Jay Gorney, Sidney Clare) – 5:21
5. "Little T" (Donald Byrd) – 6:08
6. "Paul's Pal" (Sonny Rollins) – 6:38
7. "Why Do I Love You?" (Jerome Kern, Oscar Hammerstein II) – 5:12

== Personnel ==
- Kenny Drew – piano
- Donald Byrd – trumpet
- Hank Mobley – tenor saxophone (tracks 1–3)
- Wilbur Ware – bass
- G.T. Hogan – drums
