= Ruby, My Dear (album) =

Studio album by Kenny Drew
- Released: 1980
- Recorded: August 23, 1977; Copenhagen, Denmark
- Genre: Jazz
- Length: 35:07
- Label: SteepleChase; SCS-1129
- Producer: Nils Winther

Kenny Drew chronology
Lite Flite (1977)	Ruby, My Dear (1980)	Hush-A-Bye (1978)

Ruby, My Dear is an album by pianist Kenny Drew, recorded in 1977 and released on the SteepleChase label.

== Reception ==
Professional ratings
Review scores
Source	Rating
AllMusic	3/5 stars
The Penguin Guide to Jazz Recordings	3/4 stars
The Rolling Stone Jazz Record Guide	3/5 stars

The AllMusic review awarded the album 3 stars.

== Track listing ==
All compositions by Kenny Drew except as indicated

1. "Bassment" (Duke Ellington, Billy Strayhorn) - 6:30
2. "Ruby, My Dear" (Thelonious Monk) - 5:57
3. "Gentle Rain" (Luiz Bonfá) - 5:06
4. "Ending" - 7:56
5. "Sunspots" - 9:38
6. "No Slippin'" - 3:44 Bonus track on CD

== Personnel ==
- Kenny Drew - piano
- David Friesen - bass
- Clifford Jarvis - drums
