= Pal Joey (Kenny Drew album) =

Studio album by Kenny Drew Trio
- Released: October 1958
- Recorded: October 15, 1957; New York City
- Genre: Jazz
- Length: 38:04
- Label: Riverside; RLP 12-249
- Producer: Orrin Keepnews

Kenny Drew chronology
This Is New (1957)	Pal Joey (1958)	Undercurrent (1960)

Professional ratings
Review scores
Source	Rating
Allmusic	5/5 stars
The Rolling Stone Jazz Record Guide	3/5 stars
The Penguin Guide to Jazz Recordings	3/4 stars

Pal Joey is an album by American pianist Kenny Drew recorded in 1957 and released on Riverside Records in 1958. The trio plays here pieces from the musical of the same name and other works composed by Rodgers and Hart. The album was first reissued on CD only in 1996 in the US, and in 2006 in Japan. Both editions are currently out of print.

== Track listing ==
All pieces by Richard Rodgers and Lorenz Hart.

1. "Bewitched, Bothered and Bewildered" - 4:12
2. "Do It the Hard Way" - 5:52
3. "I Didn't Know What Time It Was" - 4:01
4. "Happy Hunting Horn" - 4:18
5. "I Could Write a Book" - 4:43
6. "What Is a Man?" - 5:08
7. "My Funny Valentine" - 4:09
8. "The Lady Is a Tramp" - 5:41

== Personnel ==
- Kenny Drew - piano
- Wilbur Ware - bass
- Philly Joe Jones - drums
