= Philip Catherine =

Belgian jazz guitarist, born in London (1942)

Philip Oscar Catherine
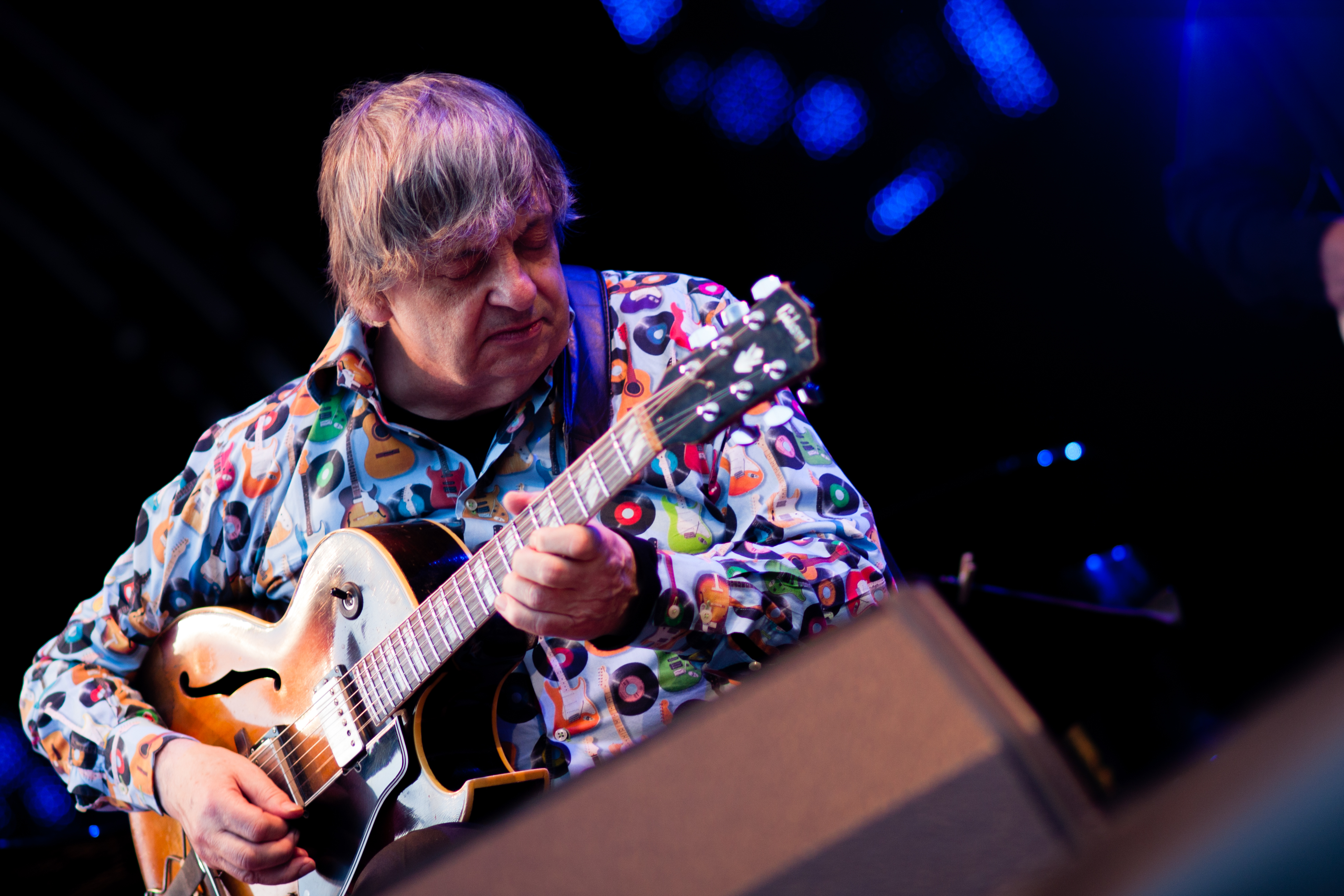
- Catherine at Jazz Marathon; Brussels, Belgium, 2012

Background information
- Born: 27 October 1942 (age 83); London, England
- Genres: Jazz rock
- Occupations: Musician, composer
- Instrument: Guitar
- Years active: 1960s – present
- Labels: Atlantic, Criss Cross Dreyfus, Challenge, ACT
- Formerly of: Focus
- Website: www.philipcatherine.com

Philip Oscar Catherine (born 27 October 1942) is a Belgian jazz rock guitarist.

== Biography ==
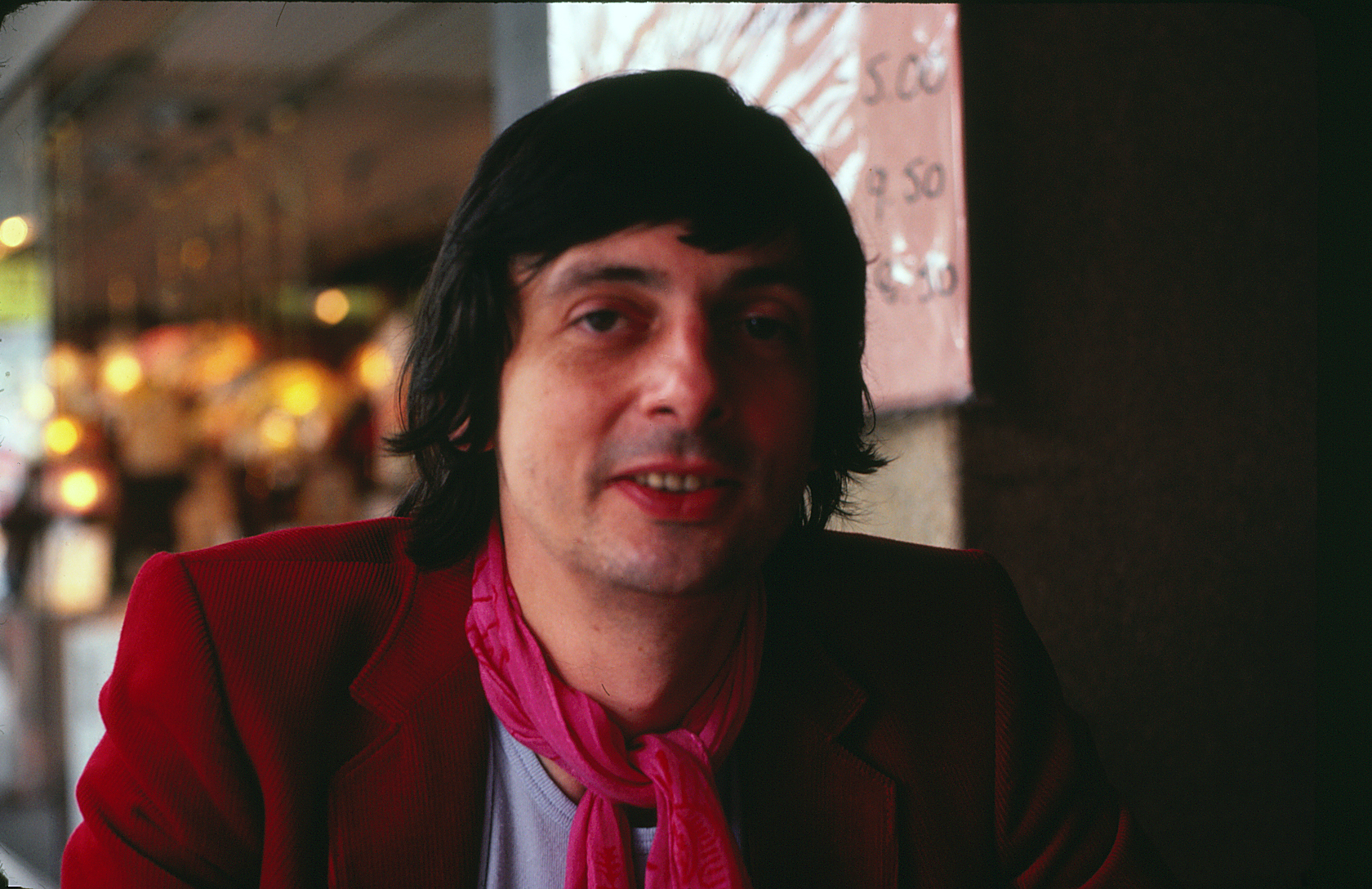
Philip Catherine in Montreux, Switzerland, 1980 Photograph by Patty Mooney

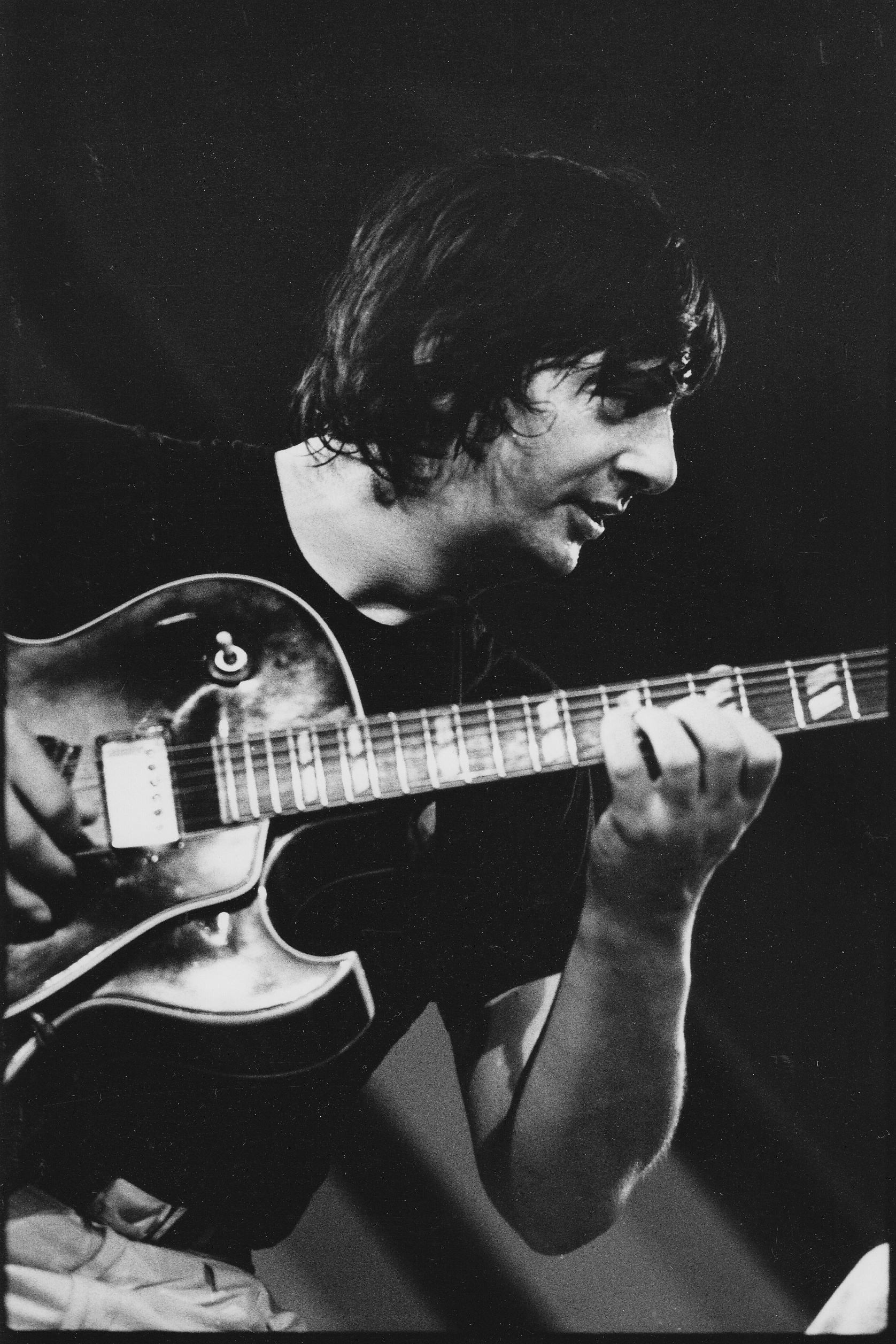
Philip Catherine, International Jazz Festival, Prague, Lucerna Music Hall, 21 October 1984

Philip Catherine was born in London, England, to an English mother and Belgian father, and was raised in Brussels, Belgium. His grandfather was a violinist in the London Symphony Orchestra. Catherine started on guitar in his teens, and by seventeen he was performing professionally at local venues.

He released his debut album, Stream, in 1972. During the next few years, he studied at Berklee College of Music in Boston and with Mick Goodrick and George Russell. In 1976, he and guitarist Larry Coryell recorded and toured as an acoustic duo. The same year, when Jan Akkerman abruptly left Focus, Catherine replaced him in the band. The following year, he recorded with Charles Mingus, who dubbed him "Young Django". In the early 1980s, he toured briefly with Benny Goodman. He was in trio with Didier Lockwood and Christian Escoudé, then in a trio with Chet Baker. During the 1990s, he recorded three albums with trumpeter Tom Harrell.

== Discography ==
=== As leader ===
- Stream (Warner Bros., 1972)
- September Man (Atlantic, 1974)
- Toots Thielemans/Philip Catherine & Friends (Keytone, 1974)
- Guitars (Atlantic, 1975)
- Niaram (Warner Bros., 1976)
- Twin-House with Larry Coryell (Elektra, 1977)
- Splendid with Larry Coryell (Elektra, 1978)
- Sleep My Love (CMP, 1979)
- Coryell/Catherine/Kuhn Live! (Elektra, 1980)
- Babel (Elektra, 1980)
- End of August (Wea, 1982)
- Catherine/Escoude/Lockwood: Trio (JMS, 1983)
- Transparence (Inak, 1987)
- September Sky with Hein Van de Geyn, Aldo Romano (September, 1988)
- Oscar (Igloo, 1990)
- I Remember You (Criss Cross, 1991)
- Moods Volume I (Criss Cross, 1992)
- Moods Volume II (Criss Cross, 1992)
- Spanish Nights with Niels-Henning Ørsted Pedersen, (Enja, 1992)
- Teenagers with Serge Delaite, George Mraz (Marcal, 1996)
- Live (Dreyfus, 1997)
- Body and Soul with Ulf Wakenius, Primož Grašič, Niels-Henning Ørsted Pedersen, Martin Drew (Jazzette, 1997)
- Guitar Groove (Dreyfus, 1998)
- Blue Prince (Dreyfus, 2000)
- Triangular (A Records, 2000)
- Summer Night (Dreyfus, 2002)
- Meeting Colours with Bert Joris & Brussels Jazz Orchestra (Dreyfus, 2005)
- Guitars Two (Dreyfus, 2007)
- Concert in Capbreton with Enrico Pieranunzi, Joe Labarbera, Hein Van De Geyn (Dreyfus, 2010)
- Philip Catherine Plays Cole Porter (Challenge, 2011)
- Cote Jardin (Challenge, 2012)
- New Folks with Martin Wind (ACT, 2014)
- The String Project Live in Brussels (ACT, 2015)
- Bex/Catherine/Romano: La Belle Vie (Sunset, 2019)
- Manoir De Mes Reves with Paulo Morello, Sven Faller (Enja, 2019)
- White Noise with Martin Wind, Ack van Rooyen (Laika, 2020)
- The Last Call: Jazz at Berlin Philharmonic XI with Larry Coryell (ACT, 2021)
- Pourquoi with Paulo Morello, Sven Faller (Enja, 2022)
- 75 Live at Flagey (Outnote, 2022)
- Live at the Berlin Jazzbühne Festival 1982 with Nicolas Fiszman (The Lost Recordings, 2023)

=== As sideman ===
With Chet Baker

- Crystal Bells (LDH, 1983)
- Chet's Choice (Criss Cross, 1985)
- Strollin' (Enja, 1986)
- In Bologna (Dreyfus, 1992)
- There 'll Never Be Another You (Timeless, 1997)
- Estate (Domino, 2015)
- Signature (Red Records, 2024)
- Late Night Jazz (Hot Club Records, 2024)

With Kenny Drew

- Morning (SteepleChase, 1976)
- In Concert (SteepleChase, 1979)
- And Far Away (Soul Note, 1983)

With Stephane Grappelli

- Les Valseuses (Festival, 1974)
- Young Django (MPS, 1979)
- Giants (MPS, 1981)
- Stephane Grappelli (MPS, 1987)
- Live 1992 (Birdology, 1992)

With Peter Herbolzheimer

- Wide Open (MPS, 1973)
- Scenes (MPS/BASF 1974)

With Joachim Kuhn

- Hip Elegy (MPS/BASF, 1976)
- Spring Fever (Atlantic, 1976)

With Rolf Kuhn

- Total Space (MPS/BASF 1975)
- Symphonic Swampfire (MPS, 1979)
- Cucu Ear (MPS, 1980)

With Marc Moulin

- Sam' Suffy (CBS, 1975)
- Into the Dark (Blue Note, 2001)
- Top Secret (Blue Note, 2001)
- Entertainment (Blue Note, 2004)
- Placebo Years 1971–1974 (Blue Note, 2006)
- I Am You (Blue Note, 2007)

With Niels-Henning Ørsted Pedersen

- Jaywalkin (SteepleChase, 1975)
- Double Bass (SteepleChase, 1976)
- Trio 1 (SteepleChase, 1978)
- Trio 2 (SteepleChase, 1978)
- The Viking (Pablo, 1983)
- Art of the Duo (Enja, 1993)

With Jean-Luc Ponty

- Open Strings (MPS/BASF 1972)
- Ponty/Grappelli (America, 1973)
- The Atacama Experience (Koch, 2007)

With others

- Larry Coryell, Back Together Again (Atlantic, 1977)
- Focus, Focus Con Proby (EMI, 1978)
- Vladimir Cosma, Courage Fuyons (Warner Bros., 1979)
- Vladimir Cosma, Le Diner De Cons (Pomme Music, 1998)
- Laila Dalseth, A Woman's Intuition (Gemini, 1995)
- Antoine Duhamel & Ron Carter, Daddy Nostalgie (CBS, 1990)
- European Jazz Ensemble, At the Philharmonic Cologne (MA Music, 1989)
- European Jazz Ensemble, Meets the Khan Family (MA Music, 1992)
- Boulou Ferré & Ellios Ferré, Live in Montpellier (Le Chant Du Monde, 2007)
- Daniel Filipacchi, Anniversary Concert (Jazz Magazine, 1984)
- Laura Fygi, Introducing (Mercury, 1991)
- Laura Fygi, Bewitched (Verve Forecast, 1993)
- Richard Galliano, New Musette (Label Bleu, 1991)
- Herb Geller, An American in Hamburg (Nova, 1975)
- Michael Gibbs, Directs the Only Chrome-Waterfall Orchestra (Bronze, 1975)
- Benny Goodman, Live in Hamburg 1981 (Stockfisch, 2020)
- Dexter Gordon, Something Different (SteepleChase, 1975 [1980])
- Chris Hinze, Sister Slick (CBS, 1974)
- Chris Hinze, Bamboo Magic (Atlantic, 1978)
- Ingfried Hoffmann, Robbi, Tobbi Und Das Fliewatuut (Diggler, 2002)
- Francois Jeanneau, Ephemere (Owl, 1977)
- Eero Koivistoinen, Jazz Liisa 13 (Svart, 2017)
- Karin Krog, You Must Believe in Spring (Polydor, 1974)
- Gino Lattuca, Bad Influence (Igloo, 2012)
- John Lee, Mango Sunrise (Blue Note, 1975)
- Roberto Magris, Current Views (Soul Note, 2009)
- Michael Mantler, More Movies (WATT Works, 1980)
- Charlie Mariano, Cascade (Keytone, 1974)
- Charlie Mariano, The Great Concert (Enja, 2009)
- Charles Mingus, Three or Four Shades of Blues (Atlantic, 1977)
- Airto Moreira, Misa Espiritual (Harmonia Mundi, 1983)
- Alphonse Mouzon, In Search of a Dream (MPS, 1978)
- Passport, Doldinger Jubilee '75 (Atlantic, 1975)
- Jacques Pelzer, Salute to the Band Box (Igloo, 1993)
- Jean Claude Petit, The Best of All Possible Worlds (WEA, 1980)
- Jean-Claude Petit, Salopes!! Vent De Panique (Milan, 1987)
- Enrico Pieranunzi, Alone Together (Challenge, 2001)
- Aldo Romano, Alma Latina (Owl, 1983)
- Zbigniew Seifert, Zbigniew Seifert (Capitol, 1977)
- Zbigniew Seifert, We'll Remember Zbiggy (Mood, 1979)
- Jack Sels, Sax Appeal (Relax, 1966)
- Jack Sels, Jack Sels (Best Seller, 1978)
- Baba Sissoko, Culture Griot (Cypres, 2009)
- Markus Stockhausen, Sol Mestizo (ACT, 1996)
- Toots Thielemans, Two Generations (Limetree, 1996)
- Toots Thielemans, Chez Toots (Private Music 1998)
- Jasper Van't Hof, Transitory (MPS/BASF 1974)
- Jasper Van't Hof, The Door Is Open (MPS/BASF 1976)
- Johan Verminnen, Traag Is Mooi (RCA, 1986)
- Johan Verminnen, Le Coeur Content (RCA, 1987)
- Jan Erik Vold & Chet Baker, Blamann! Blamann! (Hot Club, 1988)
- Barney Wilen, Sanctuary (IDA, 1991)
- Diederik Wissels & David Linx, If One More Day (Crepuscule, 1993)
- Robert Wyatt, Shleep (Hannibal, 1997)
