= Everything I Love (Jason Blaine album) =

Studio album by Jason Blaine
- Released: July 9, 2013
- Genre: Country
- Length: 39:05
- Label: E1 Entertainment

Jason Blaine chronology
Life So Far (2011)	Everything I Love (2013)	Country Side (2015)

Singles from Everything I Love
- 1. "Rock It Country Girl" Released: May 2013; 2. "Feels Like That" Released: September 2013; 3. "Friends of Mine" Released: February 24, 2014; 4. "Layin' Your Love on Me" Released: July 2014

Professional ratings
Review scores
Source	Rating
The Province	B−

Everything I Love is the fifth studio album by Canadian country music artist Jason Blaine. It was released on July 9, 2013 via E1 Entertainment. It includes the singles "Rock It Country Girl", "Feels Like That" and "Friends of Mine".

== Critical reception ==
Stuart Derdeyn of The Province gave the album a B−, writing that "Blaine sounds as though he grew up on a steady diet of Tom Petty and AOR balladeers alongside his Nashville hats."

== Track listing ==
No.	Title	Length
1.	"Feels Like That"	3:36
2.	"Rock It Country Girl"	3:52
3.	"Layin' Your Love on Me"	3:33
4.	"Good Ol' Nights"	3:46
5.	"Always You"	3:14
6.	"Friends of Mine"	3:32
7.	"Way Too Pretty"	3:23
8.	"Get a Little Wrong Tonight"	3:33
9.	"We Got It Made"	3:29
10.	"Home Sweet Home"	3:20
11.	"Tears on a Bible"	3:47
Total length:		39:05

== Chart performance ==
=== Singles ===
Year	Single	Peak chart positions	
Year	Single	CAN Country	CAN
2013	"Rock It Country Girl"	13	80
2013	"Feels Like That"	18	—
2014	"Friends of Mine"	12	84
2014	"Layin' Your Love on Me"	46	—
"—" denotes releases that did not chart
