= Everything I Love (Kenny Drew album) =

Studio album by Kenny Drew
- Released: 1974
- Recorded: October/December 1973; Copenhagen, Denmark
- Genre: Jazz
- Length: 45:34
- Label: SteepleChase; SCS-1007
- Producer: Nils Winther

Kenny Drew chronology
Duo (1973)	Everything I Love (1974)	Duo 2 (1974)

Professional ratings
Review scores
Source	Rating
Allmusic	4.5/5 stars
The Penguin Guide to Jazz	2.5/4 stars

Everything I Love is a solo piano album by American jazz pianist Kenny Drew recorded in 1973 and released on the SteepleChase label.

== Reception ==
The Allmusic review awarded the album 4½ stars, stating: "This is easily one of the best albums of Kenny Drew's career."

== Track listing ==
All compositions by Kenny Drew except as indicated

1. "Sunset" - 3:45
2. "Portrait of Mariann" - 4:30
3. "Blues for Nils" - 3:25
4. "Yesterdays" (Otto Harbach, Jerome Kern) - 5:55
5. "Ev'rything I Love" (Cole Porter) - 3:23
6. "Flamingo" - 2:39 Bonus track on CD
7. "Fingering" - 1:48 Bonus track on CD
8. "Winter Flower" (Thomas Clausen) - 4:32
9. "Fall" - 5:43
10. "I Can't Get Started" (Vernon Duke, Ira Gershwin) - 4:47
11. "Don't Explain" (Billie Holiday, Arthur Herzog Jr.) - 5:07
- Recorded on October 1 (tracks 6, 7 & 10), November 13 (tracks 1, 4 & 9), November 14 (tracks 2 & 11) and December 31 (tracks 3, 5 & 8), 1973 in Copenhagen, Denmark

== Personnel ==
- Kenny Drew - piano
