= Whims of Chambers =

Studio album by the Paul Chambers Sextet
- Released: c. January 1957
- Recorded: September 21, 1956
- Studio: Van Gelder Studio; Hackensack, NJ
- Genre: Hard bop
- Length: 38:31
- Label: Blue Note; BLP 1534
- Producer: Alfred Lion

Paul Chambers chronology
Chambers' Music (1956)	Whims of Chambers (1957)	Bass on Top (1957)

Whims of Chambers is a studio album by the jazz bassist Paul Chambers. It was released through Blue Note Records circa January 1957. The sextet assembled for the recording consists of trumpeter Donald Byrd, saxophonist John Coltrane, guitarist Kenny Burrell, Horace Silver, Chambers and Philly Joe Jones.

== Reception ==
Professional ratings
Review scores
Source	Rating
AllMusic	4/5 stars
The Penguin Guide to Jazz Recordings	3/4 stars

The AllMusic review by Scott Yanow states, "This is a fine effort and would be worth picking up by straightahead jazz fans even if John Coltrane had not participated."

== Track listing ==
All tracks are written by Paul Chambers, except as noted.

Side 1
No.	Title	Writer(s)	Length
1.	"Omicron"	Donald Byrd	7:21
2.	"Whims of Chambers"		4:06
3.	"Nita"	John Coltrane	6:34

Side 2
No.	Title	Writer(s)	Length
1.	"We Six"	Byrd	7:42
2.	"Dear Ann"		4:21
3.	"Tale of the Fingers"		4:44
4.	"Just for the Love"	Coltrane	3:43

== Personnel ==
=== Paul Chambers Sextet ===
- Paul Chambers – bass
- Donald Byrd – trumpet
- John Coltrane – tenor saxophone
- Kenny Burrell – guitar
- Horace Silver – piano
- Philly Joe Jones – drums

=== Technical personnel ===
- Alfred Lion – producer
- Rudy Van Gelder – recording engineer
- Reid Miles – design
- Francis Wolff – photography
- Leonard Feather – liner notes

== Sources ==
- Chambers, Paul. 1957. Whims Of Chambers. CD. Blue Note CDP 7243 8 37647 2 3.
