= Niels-Henning Ørsted Pedersen =

Danish jazz double bassist (1946–2005)

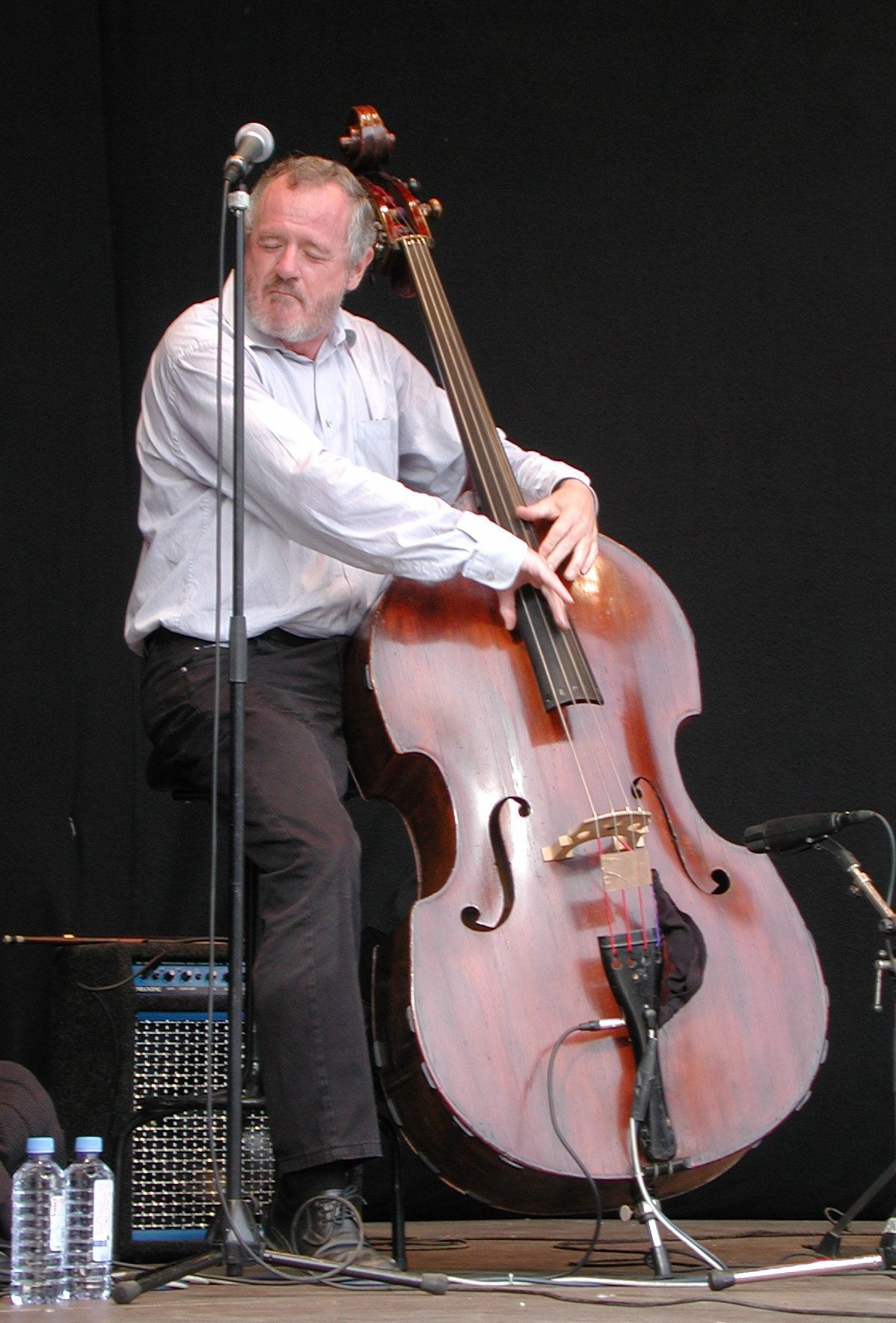
- Pedersen in 2001

Background information
- Born: 27 May 1946; Osted, Zealand, Denmark
- Died: 19 April 2005 (aged 58) Ishøj, Zealand, Denmark
- Genres: Jazz, avant-garde jazz
- Occupations: Musician, composer
- Instrument: Double-bass
- Years active: 1960s–2005

Niels-Henning Ørsted Pedersen (Danish pronunciation: [ne̝lsˈhene̝ŋ ˈɶɐ̯steð ˈpʰe̝(ː)ðɐsn̩]; 27 May 1946 – 19 April 2005), also known by his abbreviated nickname NHØP, was a Danish jazz double bassist.

== Biography ==
Pedersen was born in Osted, near Roskilde, on the Danish island of Zealand, the son of a church organist. As a child, Ørsted Pedersen played piano, but from the age of 13, he started learning to play upright bass and at the age of 14, while studying, he began his professional jazz career in Denmark with his first band, Jazzkvintet 60 (Danish for Jazz Quintet 60). By the age of fifteen, he had the ability to accompany leading musicians at nightclubs, working regularly at Copenhagen's Jazzhus Montmartre, after his debut there on New Year's Eve 1961, when he was only 15. When seventeen, he had already turned down an offer to join the Count Basie orchestra, mainly because he was too young to get legal permission to live and work as a musician in the United States. His influences were Walter Page, Paul Chambers, Scott LaFaro, and Ray Brown.

The Montmartre was a regular stop-off for touring American Jazz stars, and as a member of the house band, the young Ørsted Pedersen performed with saxophonists such as Booker Ervin, Sonny Rollins, Dexter Gordon, Rahsaan Roland Kirk and Stan Getz, and pianist Bill Evans, with whom he toured in Europe in 1965. During the 1960s, Pedersen played with a series of other important American jazzmen who were touring or resident in Denmark, including Ben Webster, Brew Moore, Bud Powell, Count Basie, Roy Eldridge, Dizzy Gillespie, Jackie McLean, and vocalist Ella Fitzgerald.

He is perhaps best known for his extensive collaboration with Oscar Peterson from 1972 to 1987. His predecessor, Ray Brown, thought highly of the Dane and regarded him as the only upright bassist equal to the task of keeping up with the pianist. He was awarded Best Bass Player of the Year by DownBeat Critics' Poll in 1981.

Ørsted Pedersen worked in duo and trio arrangements with pianist Kenny Drew, recording over 50 albums together. He also worked with Stéphane Grappelli and Joe Pass and recorded extensively as a leader. His best known songs are "My Little Anna", "Jaywalkin'", and "The Puzzle", as well as jazz arrangements of traditional Danish folk songs. A duo performance with Rune Gustafsson at Vossajazz 1980, concluded on the album Just The Way You Are on the label Sonet Gramofon, recorded half a year after this first meeting. He was awarded the Nordic Council Music Prize in 1991.

Pedersen had a particular ability to interpret Danish songs and folk melodies. He often played within trio ensembles, partly collectively with the trumpeter Palle Mikkelborg and the keyboard player Kenneth Knudsen, and partly under his own name, usually with guitarists like Philip Catherine and Ulf Wakenius. In 1999, he co-led a duo with pianist Mulgrew Miller, touring Europe, Japan, Australia, and Korea. This format was later enlarged into a trio featuring drummer Alvin Queen. This trio remained intact until Pedersen's death.

== Death ==
Ørsted Pedersen died of heart failure in 2005 at the age of 58 in Copenhagen, Denmark. He was surrounded by his wife, Solveig, and his three children. Oscar Peterson wrote:

After hearing this phenomenal talent on bass, I realized that somehow, someday we should meet, thereby giving me the opportunity to also play with him. This vision and thought took place in the early 1970s, when I was fortunate enough to be able to invite him to join my then trio.

Allow me to express my reaction to his playing this way: First and foremost, he never got in my way—but he also had such a great musical perception of what I was trying to do that he served to greatly inspire me from a spontaneous aspect. I came off walking on Cloud 3000 that evening because of Niels' musical contribution. He had the most phenomenal technique, coupled with incredible harmonic perception, along with impeccable time. I shall never forget that evening.

Almost from that evening on, we became very close friends, not just musically but most certainly personally, for I developed a great admiration for the depth of Niels' political, geographical and personal understandings. He was a man who had an almost unbelievable wealth of historic cognizance pertaining to European history. He also had a very kindred spirit as a human being, always able to easily make good friends, should he care to do so.

— Oscar Peterson, writing in Jazztimes.

== Awards and honors ==
- 1974: Grammy Award. Best Jazz Performance by a Group, The Trio – Oscar Peterson, Joe Pass and Niels-Henning Ørsted Pedersen
- 1981: Best Bass Player of the Year by Downbeat Critics' Poll
- 1991: Nordic Council Music Prize

== Discography ==
=== As leader ===
- Paul Bley/NHØP with Paul Bley (SteepleChase, 1973)
- Duo with Kenny Drew (SteepleChase, 1973)
- Duo 2 with Kenny Drew (SteepleChase, 1974)
- Two's Company with Joe Albany (SteepleChase, 1974)
- Jaywalkin' (SteepleChase, 1975)
- Duo Live in Concert with Kenny Drew (SteepleChase, 1975)
- Movability collaboration with Martial Solal (MPS, 1976)
- Double Bass with Sam Jones (SteepleChase, 1976)
- Pictures with Kenneth Knudsen (SteepleChase, 1977)
- In Concert collaboration with Kenny Drew (SteepleChase, 1979)
- Dancing on the Tables (SteepleChase, 1979)
- Goin' Straight with Edgar Wilson (MPS, 1979)
- Tania Maria & Niels Henning Orsted Pedersen (Medley, 1979)
- Four Keys (MPS) collaboration with Martial Solal, Lee Konitz, John Scofield (MPS, 1979)
- Chops with Joe Pass (Pablo, 1979)
- Just the Way You Are with Rune Gustafsson (Sonet, 1980)
- Northsea Nights with Joe Pass (Pablo, 1980)
- Looking at Bird with Archie Shepp (SteepleChase, 1981)
- The Viking with Philip Catherine (Pablo, 1983)
- Trinity with Boulou Ferre, Elios Ferre (SteepleChase, 1983)
- Face to Face collaboration with Tete Montoliu (SteepleChase, 1984)
- With a Little Help from My Friend(s) collaboration with Claes Crona (Skivbolaget, 1985)
- With Joy and Feelings collaboration with Ulla Neumann (Four Leaf Clover, 1985)
- The Eternal Traveller (Pablo, 1984)
- Play with Us collaboration with Louis Hjulmand (Olufsen, 1987)
- Duologue collaboration with Allan Botschinsky (MA Music, 1987)
- Copenhagen Groove with Moller/Clausen/Cobb (Stunt, 1989)
- Three for the Road with Guitars Unlimited (Sonet, 1989)
- Homage/Once Upon a Time with Palle Mikkelborg (Sonet, 1990)
- Uncharted Land (Pladecompagniet, 1992)
- Spanish Nights with Philip Catherine (Enja, 1992)
- Art of the Duo with Philip Catherine (Enja, 1993)
- Ambiance with Danish Radio Big Band (Dacapo, 1994)
- Misty Dawn with Doky/Riel (Columbia, 1994)
- Scandinavian Wood (Caprice, 1995)
- Those Who Were (Verve, 1996)
- Elegies Mostly collaboration with Dick Hyman (Gemini, 1996)
- Friends Forever featuring Renee Rosnes (Milestone, 1997) – recorded in 1995
- This Is All I Ask (Verve, 1998)
- In the Name of Music with Trio Rococo (BMG, 1998)
- The Duets with Mulgrew Miller (Bang & Olufsen, 1999)
- Breaking the Ice collaboration with Floris Nico Bunink (BV Haast, 1999)
- Grundtvigs Sang Til Livet collaboration with Ole Kock Hansen (Vartov, 2000)
- The Unforgettable NHØP Trio Live (ACT Music, 2007)
- The Duo Live! with Mulgrew Miller (Storyville, 2016)

=== As sideman ===
- Chet Baker: ‘’The Touch of Your Lips’’ (Steeple Chase SCS-1122, 1979)
- Edgar Wilson: Goin' Straight (MPS, 1979)
- Monty Alexander, Grady Tate: Threesome (Soul Note, 1986)
- Alain Jean-Marie: Latin Alley (IDA, 1988)

== See also ==
- List of jazz bassists
