= Paul Chambers =

American jazz double bassist (1935–1969)

Background information
- Born: Paul Laurence Dunbar Chambers Jr. April 22, 1935; Pittsburgh, Pennsylvania, U.S.
- Origin: Detroit, Michigan, U.S.
- Died: January 4, 1969 (aged 33) New York City, U.S.
- Genres: Jazz; modal jazz; bebop; hard bop
- Occupations: Musician; composer
- Instrument: Double bass
- Years active: 1954–1969
- Labels: Blue Note; Prestige; Verve; Riverside

Paul Laurence Dunbar Chambers Jr. (April 22, 1935 – January 4, 1969) was an American jazz double bassist. A fixture of rhythm sections during the 1950s and 1960s, he has become one of the most widely-known jazz bassists of the hard bop era. He was also known for his bowed solos. Chambers recorded about a dozen albums as a leader or co-leader, and more than 100 as a sideman, especially as the anchor of trumpeter Miles Davis's "first great quintet" (1955–63) and with pianist Wynton Kelly (1963–68).

== Biography ==
Born in Pittsburgh, Pennsylvania, on April 22, 1935, to Paul Lawrence Chambers and Margaret Echos, he was brought up in Detroit, Michigan, following the death of his mother. He began playing music with several of his schoolmates on the baritone horn. Later he took up the tuba. "I got along pretty well, but it's quite a job to carry it around in those long parades, and I didn't like the instrument that much".

== Bass playing ==
Chambers switched to the double bass around 1949. His formal bass training began in earnest in 1952, when he began taking private lessons with Gaston Brohan, principal bassist of the Detroit Symphony Orchestra. Chambers did some classical playing himself, with a rehearsal group called the Detroit String Band. He studied at Cass Technical High School intermittently from 1952 to 1955, and played in Cass' symphony, and in various other student groups, in one of which he played baritone saxophone.

When he left for New York City at the invitation of tenor saxophonist Paul Quinichette, he had a working knowledge of many instruments. Jazz bass players were largely limited to timekeeping with drums, until Duke Ellington's bassist Jimmy Blanton began a transformation in the instrument's role at the end of the 1930s. Chambers was about 15 years old when he started to listen to Charlie Parker and Bud Powell, his first jazz influences. Oscar Pettiford and Ray Brown were the first bassists he admired, and these were followed by Percy Heath, Milt Hinton and Wendell Marshall for their rhythm section work, and Charles Mingus and George Duvivier for their technical prowess and for their efforts in broadening the scope of jazz bass. Blanton was his all-time favorite.

== First performance on bass ==
From 1954 on through 1955, he gained significance touring with such musicians as Bennie Green, Quinichette, George Wallington, J. J. Johnson and Kai Winding. In 1955, Chambers joined the Miles Davis quintet, and he was awarded the DownBeat "New Star Award" the following year. Chambers stayed with the group until 1963, and he appeared on many classic albums, including Kind of Blue (1959). One of Chambers' most noted performances was on that album's first track, "So What", which opens with a brief duet featuring Chambers and pianist Bill Evans. From 1963 until 1966, Chambers played with Wynton Kelly's trio. He freelanced frequently as a sideman for many others throughout his career.

== Personal life ==
Chambers developed addictions to both alcohol and heroin. He was hospitalized at the end of 1968 with what was thought to be a severe case of influenza, but tests revealed that he had tuberculosis. As his organ functions deteriorated, Chambers lapsed into a coma for 18 days. It is believed his addictions to heroin and alcohol contributed to his health problems. On January 4, 1969, he died of tuberculosis at the age of 33.

== Influence ==
From his role in the Davis band, Chambers was the bassist in two rhythm sections. The first, with Red Garland on piano and Philly Joe Jones on drums, came to be known as "the rhythm section", that name featured on a celebrated album by saxophonist Art Pepper, Art Pepper Meets the Rhythm Section. The second, with Wynton Kelly and Jimmy Cobb, made many sessions as a unit, recording albums with John Coltrane, Wes Montgomery, and by themselves under Kelly's name on albums such as Kelly Blue (1959).

Chambers was in great demand as a session musician, and played on numerous albums including such landmarks as Thelonious Monk's Brilliant Corners (1957), Coltrane's Giant Steps (1960), and Oliver Nelson's The Blues and the Abstract Truth (1961). Many musicians wrote songs dedicated to Chambers. Red Garland wrote the tune "The P.C. Blues", and Coltrane's song "Mr. P.C." is named after Chambers. Tommy Flanagan wrote "Big Paul", which was performed on the Kenny Burrell and John Coltrane Prestige 1958 LP. Max Roach wrote a drum solo called "Five For Paul", on a 1977 drum solo LP recorded in Japan, and Sonny Rollins wrote "Paul's Pal" for him as well. In the world of alternative rock, Barenaked Ladies bass player Jim Creeggan wrote the song "Paul Chambers" for their 2021 album Detour de Force.

In an interview, fellow bassist Charlie Haden recalled his admiration for Chambers:

"[T]he first guy who was really distinctive to me — when I was 19 or so — was Paul Chambers, who I heard on all those Prestige and Riverside records. There’s an underrated player! He had a way of playing chromatic notes in his bass lines that was just unreal. He would go up into the high register, and then skip down, tying it together… He had this great sound, and this great time."

== Discography ==
- Chambers' Music (Jazz: West, 1956)
- Whims of Chambers (Blue Note, 1957)
- Bass on Top (Blue Note, 1957)
- Paul Chambers Quintet (Blue Note, 1958)
- We Three (New Jazz, 1959) with Roy Haynes and Phineas Newborn Jr.
- Go (Vee-Jay, 1959)
- 1st Bassman (Vee-Jay, 1960)
