= List of Phi Mu Alpha Sinfonia members =

This is a list of distinguished members of Phi Mu Alpha Sinfonia fraternity (ΦΜΑ) who have achieved significant recognition in their respective fields, including (but not limited to) education, film, industry, literature, music, philanthropy, public service, radio, science, and television.

In determining the classification for each Sinfonian listed here, an attempt was made to classify the individual based on what he is most known for. In some cases, a person such as Aaron Copland may be known equally as a conductor and a composer. In other cases, an individual such as Branford Marsalis may be known equally as a jazz musician and a television personality.

Honorary members are in italics, charter members are in bold.

== "Big band" leaders ==
Name	Original chapter	Notability	Ref.
Percy Faith	Gamma Omega (1963)	Bandleader, known for arrangements of "easy listening" music	
Hal Kemp	**Alpha Rho (1926)**	Jazz alto saxophonist, clarinetist, bandleader, composer, and arranger; member of the Big Band and Jazz Hall of Fame; had four number one hits in the 1930s	
Buddy Morrow	Rho Tau (1968)	Conductor of the Tommy Dorsey Orchestra, 1977–2010	
Paul Whiteman	Epsilon Zeta (1956)	Bandleader and orchestral director; commissioned Rhapsody in Blue by George Gershwin	

== Businessmen and philanthropists ==
Name	Original chapter	Notability	Ref.
George Banta	Alpha (1917)	Founder of the George Banta Company (later known as Banta Corporation); served as historian of Phi Delta Theta fraternity and is honored as a "second founder" of that fraternity in recognition of his contributions to its development and expansion; instrumental in the expansion of Delta Gamma women's fraternity, of which he remains the only male initiate, and was an advocate of collegiate Greek life; mayor of Menasha, Wisconsin in 1892, 1895, and 1902–1903	
Andrew Carnegie	Alpha (1917)	Founder of Pittsburgh's Carnegie Steel Company which later became United States Steel; philanthropist; namesake of Carnegie-Mellon University, Carnegie Hall, and numerous libraries	
George Eastman	Alpha Nu (1927)	Founded Eastman Kodak Company, invented the roll of film, and endowed the establishment of the Eastman School of Music	
Henry Clay Frick	Alpha (1917)	Industrialist, financier, and art patron; founder of H. C. Frick & Company; chairman of the Carnegie Steel Company; played a major role in the formation of the giant United States Steel	
Major Henry Lee Higginson	Alpha (1915)	Survivor of the Battle of Aldie; founded the Boston Symphony Orchestra in 1881; served as president of the Boston Music Hall and as trustee of the New England Conservatory of Music, 1892–1919	
Otto H. Kahn	Alpha (1917)	Investment banker, collector, philanthropist, and patron of the arts; built Oheka Castle, the second largest private home in the US; served as chairman of the National Music Week Committee of the National Bureau for the Advancement of Music in the 1920s	
Harvey S. Mudd	Beta Psi (1941)	Mining engineer; founder, investor, and president of the Cyprus Mines Corporation; namesake of Harvey Mudd College, a science and engineering college in Claremont, California	
Charles M. Schwab	Alpha (1917)	Industrialist; steel magnate; under his leadership, Bethlehem Steel became the second largest steel maker in the US, and one of the most important heavy manufacturers in the world	
Henry Z. Steinway	Alpha Alpha (1962)	Philanthropist; heir to Steinway piano manufacturing legacy; president of Steinway & Sons, 1955–1977; awarded the National Medal of Arts in 2007; founding president of the Museum of Making Music in Carlsbad, California	

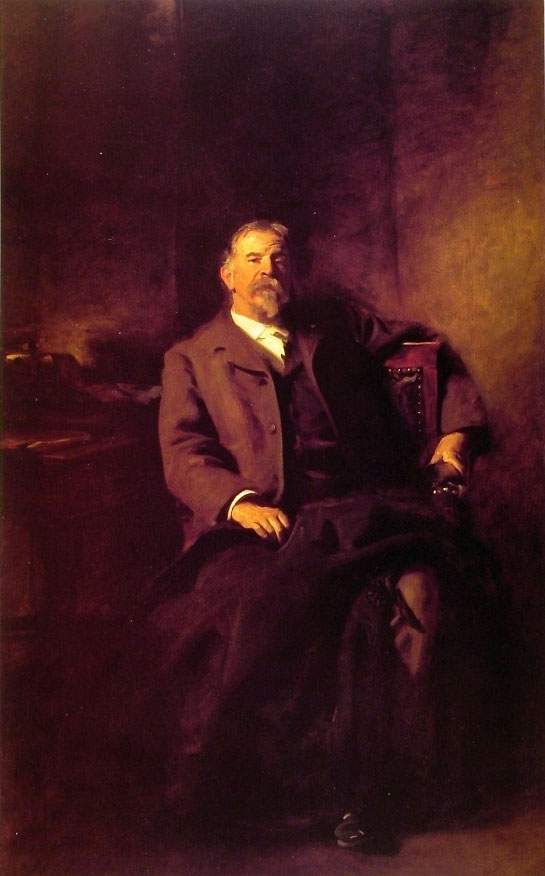
Henry Lee Higginson, portrait by John Singer Sargent (1903)

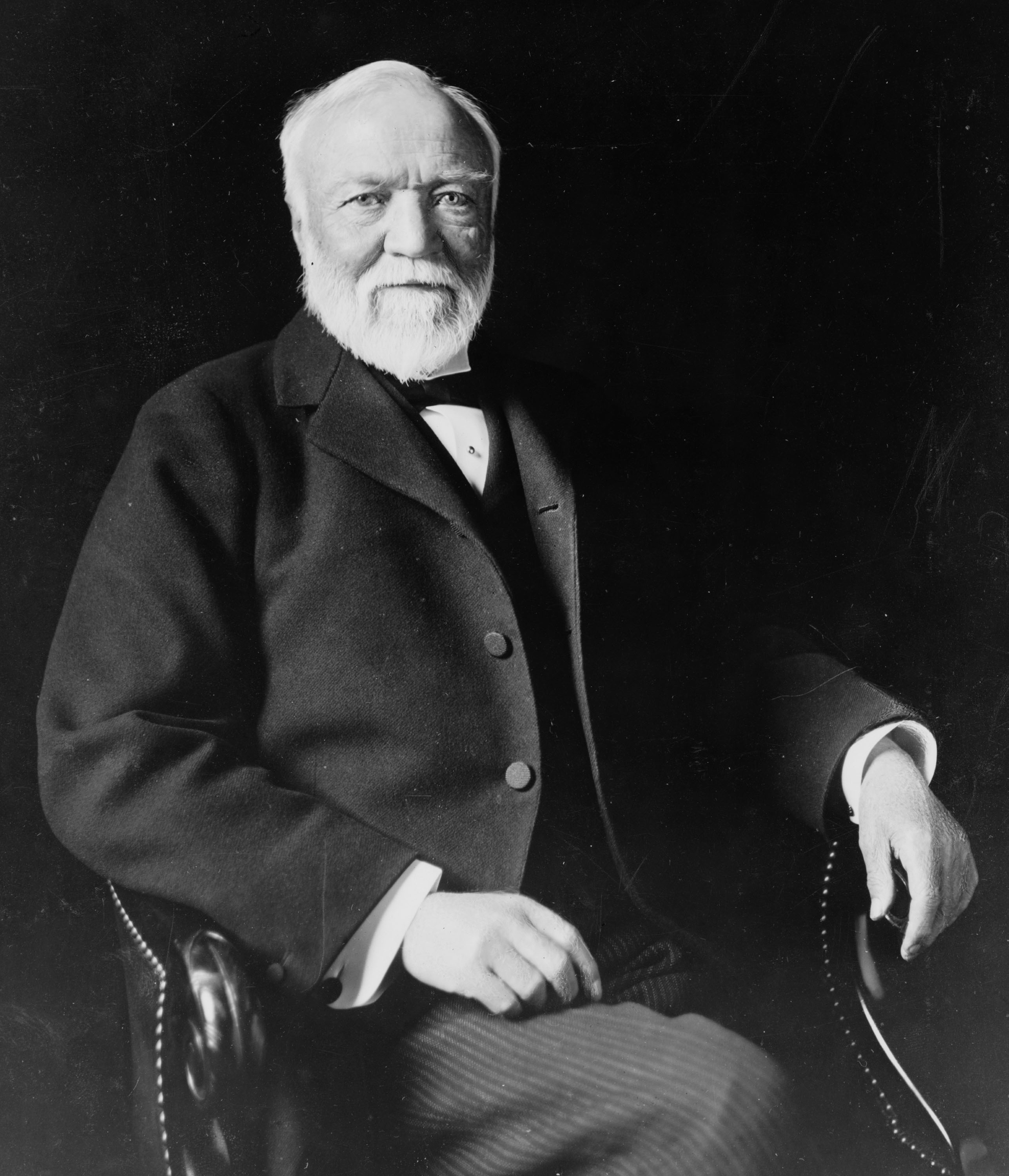
Andrew Carnegie, c. 1913

== Composers ==
=== Band/winds ===
Name	Original chapter	Notability	Ref.
Richard Franko Goldman	Beta Omicron (1940)	Band director; son of Edwin Franko Goldman, founder of the American Bandmasters Association	
Percy A. Grainger	Beta Omicron (1940)	Australian-born pianist; champion of the saxophone and concert band	
David Holsinger	Beta Mu (1964)	Two-time recipient of the Sousa/Ostwald Award given by the American Bandmasters Association for best band composition	
Martin Mailman	Zeta Psi (1961)	Prolific and well-decorated composer; two-time recipient of the Sousa/Ostwald Award	
David Maslanka	Rho Tau (2008)	Best known for his wind band works including "A Child's Garden of Dreams"; two-time recipient of the National Endowment for the Arts Composer Award	
W. Francis McBeth	Alpha Iota (1957)	Winner of the Presley Award at Hardin-Simmons University in 1954; named Composer Laureate of Arkansas in 1975; received the Charles E. Lutton Man of Music Award in 1988	
William Schuman	Beta Gamma (1930)	Former president of the Juilliard School; first president of Lincoln Center; awarded the inaugural Pulitzer Prize for Music in 1943, the National Medal of Arts in 1987, and the Kennedy Center Honors in 1989	
John Philip Sousa	Alpha Xi (1925)	Known as the "March King;" composer of over 100 marches, including the national march "The Stars and Stripes Forever"	
Jack Stamp	Zeta Tau (1973)	Inducted into the American Bandmasters Association in 2000; awarded the title of "university professor" for the 2008–2009 academic year at IUP	
James Swearingen	Iota Omicron (1968)	Inducted into the American Bandmasters Association in 2000	
Frank Ticheli	Alpha Alpha (2009)	Well-decorated composer; recipient of the Arts and Letters Award, Goddard Lieberson Fellowship, and Charles Ives Scholarship, all from the American Academy of Arts and Letters	
J. Clifton Williams	Beta Omega (1946)	First winner of the Sousa/Ostwald Award; known for concert march "The Sinfonians", which incorporates the fraternity song "Hail Sinfonia"	

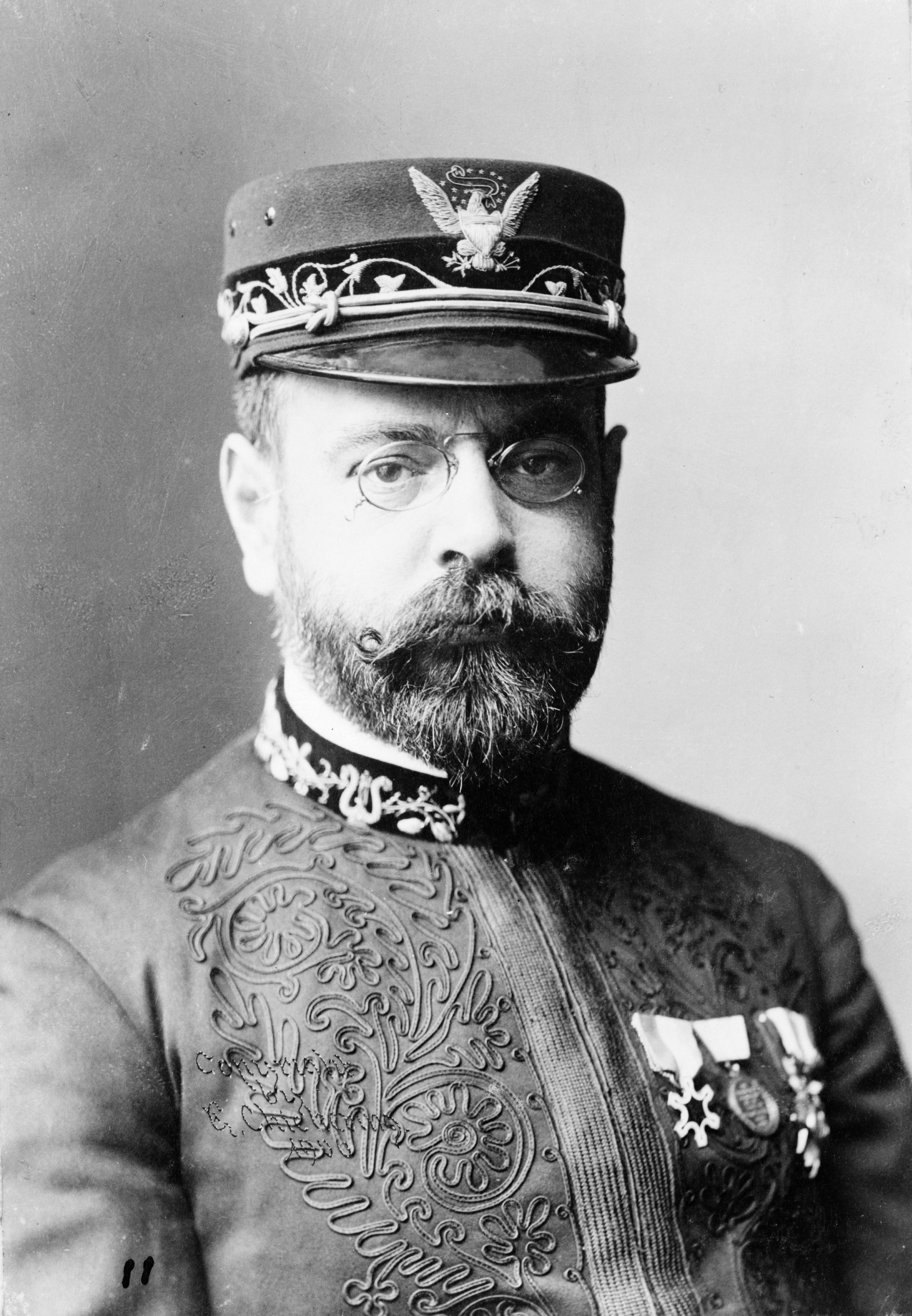
John Philip Sousa c. 1900

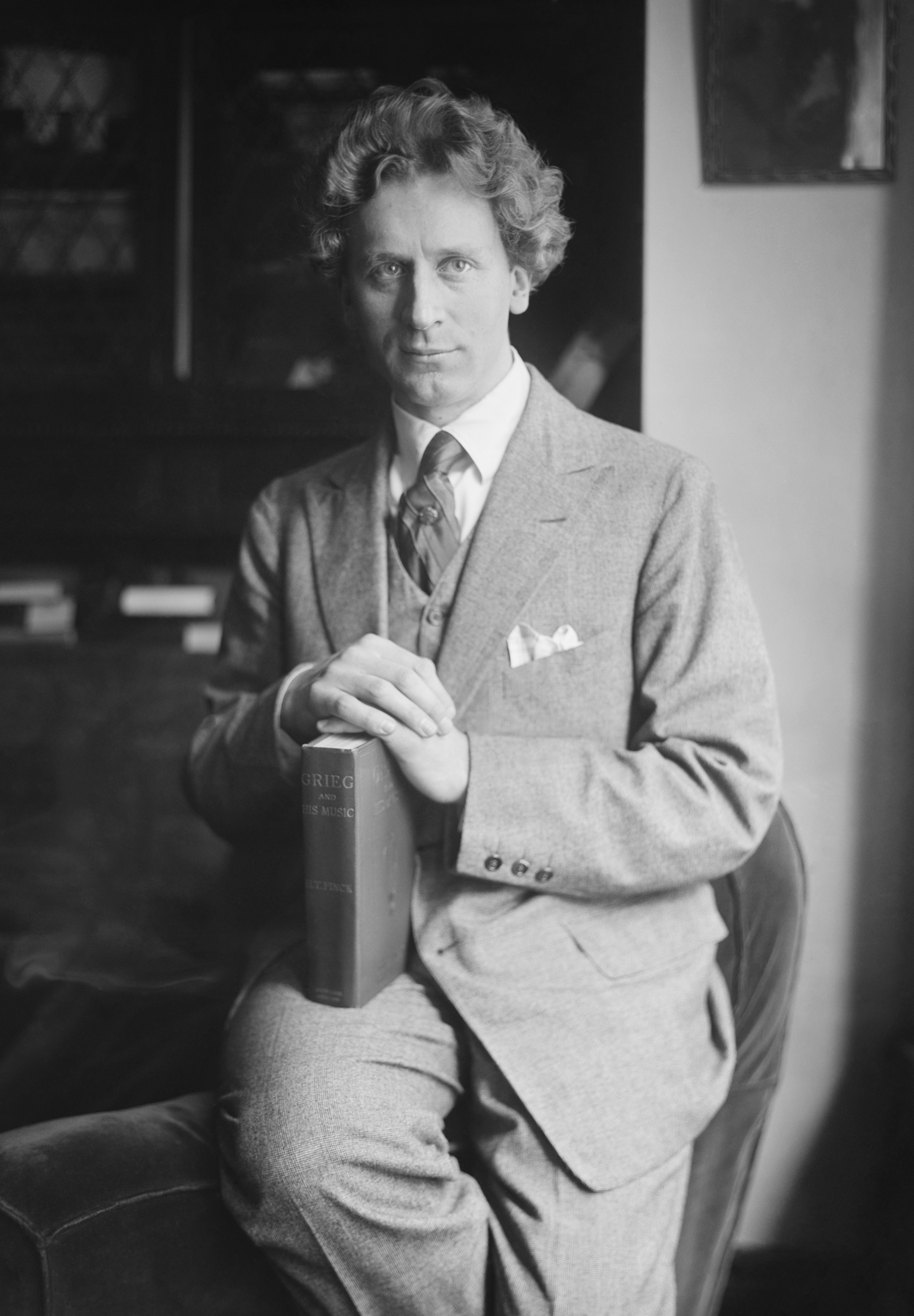
Percy Grainger

=== Choral/vocal ===
Name	Original chapter	Notability	Ref.
William Levi Dawson	Alpha Alpha (1977)	Arranger of African-American spirituals; recipient of the University of Pennsylvania Glee Club Award of Merit in 1968	
Frank Ferko	Kappa Sigma (1969)	Recipient of a Holtkamp Award from the American Guild of Organists in 1990	
Daniel Pinkham	Alpha (1959)	Named Composer of the Year by the American Guild of Organists in 1990	
Leo Sowerby	Rho (1933)	First composer to receive the Rome Prize, in 1921; recipient of the 1946 Pulitzer Prize for Music	
Randall Thompson	Rho Tau (1972)	Noted for choral compositions Alleluia and Testament of Freedom; first recipient of the University of Pennsylvania Glee Club Award of Merit, in 1964; recipient of Yale University's Sanford Medal	
Peter Wilhousky	Beta Gamma (1949)	Arranged "Battle Hymn of the Republic"; wrote English lyrics of "Carol of the Bells"	

=== Film/TV ===
Name	Original chapter	Notability	Ref.
Warren Barker	Beta Psi (1942)	Wrote theme songs for Bewitched, 77 Sunset Strip, That Girl, and the Donny and Marie Osmond Show	
John Cacavas	Iota (1951)	Composer of music for television shows including Hawaii Five-O, Kojak, The Bionic Woman, and Buck Rogers in the 25th Century, and the films Airport 1975 and Airport '77	
Bill Conti	Beta Omega (1960)	Film and television composer, including for Rocky and the James Bond film For Your Eyes Only; won an Academy Award for Best Original Song for The Right Stuff and three Emmy Awards for Outstanding Musical Direction for the 64th, 70th and 75th Academy Award ceremonies	
Dave Grusin	Beta Chi (1953)	Composed the theme songs for Maude, Good Times, Baretta, and St. Elsewhere; recipient of the Charles E. Lutton Man of Music Award in 1991	
Nelson S. Riddle, Jr.	Gamma Omega (1967)	Bandleader, arranger, orchestrator; composed soundtrack of the 1960s Batman television series and 1966 movie	
David Rose	Gamma Omega (1968)	Wrote music for The Red Skelton Show and Bonanza; known for 1962 Billboard #1 hit "The Stripper"; has a star on the Hollywood Walk of Fame	

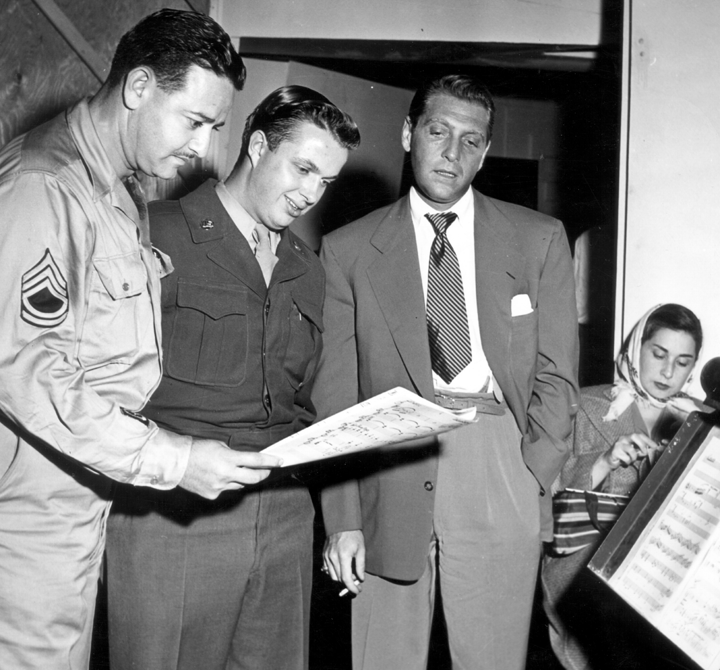
David Rose (3rd from left) in AFRS Radio Show, c. 1946

=== Post-romantic ===
Name	Original chapter	Notability	Ref.
George W. Chadwick	Alpha (1909)	Director of the New England Conservatory of Music, 1897–1930; member of "Boston Six"; "Sinfonia" in the fraternity's name is attributed to Chadwick, based on the name of a student organization he was a member of at the Leipzig Conservatory	

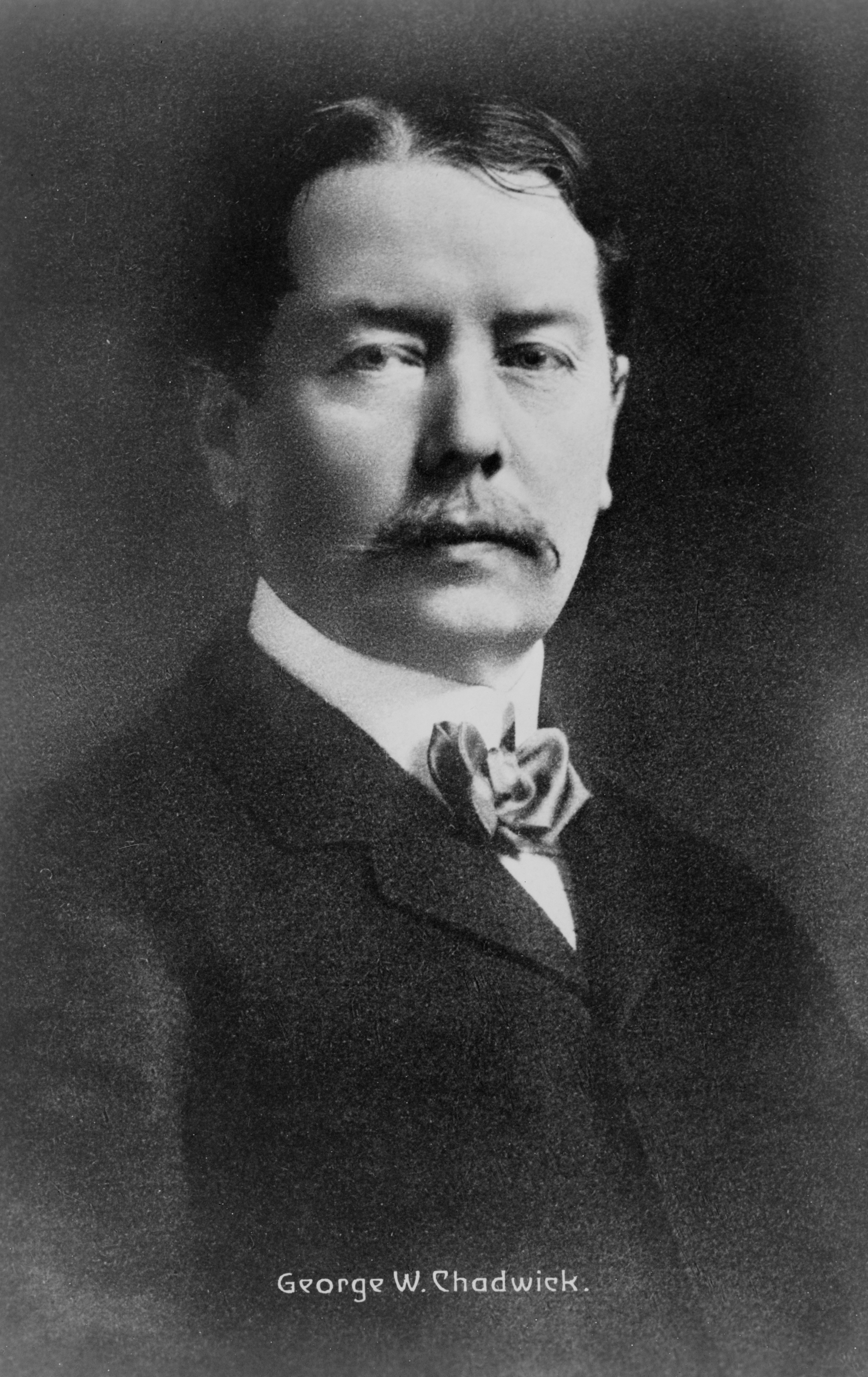
George W. Chadwick c. 1909

=== Other ===
Name	Original chapter	Notability	Ref.
Samuel Adler	Gamma Theta (1960), Alpha Alpha (1966)	German-born composer; named Composer of the Year by the American Guild of Organists in 1991	
Leroy Anderson	Gamma Omega (1969)	Composer, noted for "Bugler's Holiday", "Syncopated Clock", and the holiday classic "Sleigh Ride"; has a star on the Hollywood Walk of Fame	
Robert Russell Bennett	Gamma Omega (1966)	First president of the American Society of Music Arrangers and Composers (ASMAC); won an Oscar for the film Oklahoma!	
Aaron Copland	Alpha Upsilon (1961)	Recipient of the Presidential Medal of Freedom, Pulitzer Prize in composition for Appalachian Spring, and Charles E. Lutton Man of Music Award in 1970; a Kennedy Center honoree in 1979; his well-known compositions include Fanfare for the Common Man and Rodeo	
George Crumb	Beta Chi (1961)	Received the Pulitzer Prize for Music in 1968 for his orchestral work Echoes of Time and the River and a Grammy Award for Best Contemporary Composition in 2001 for his work Star-Child	
Norman Dello Joio	Epsilon Nu (1971)	Won the Pulitzer Prize for Music for his Meditations on Ecclesiastes in 1957, and an Emmy Award in 1965 for his score to the NBC special The Louvre	
Carlisle Floyd	Epsilon Iota (1957)	Awarded the National Medal of Arts in 2004; named the Charles E. Lutton Man of Music in 2012	
Morton Gould	Alpha Delta (1947)	Awarded the Pulitzer Prize for Music for Stringmusic in 1995, and a Grammy Lifetime Achievement Award in 2005	
Ferde Grofé	Beta Epsilon (1939)	Piano player for Paul Whiteman's orchestra; arranged George Gershwin's Rhapsody in Blue for both jazz and full orchestras; known for Grand Canyon Suite	
Adolphus Hailstork	Rho Mu (2010)	Composer and educator	
Howard Hanson	Iota (1916)	Director of the Eastman School of Music, 1924–1964; recipient of the 1944 Pulitzer Prize for his Symphony No. 4, Requiem, and the Charles E. Lutton Man of Music Award in 1954	
Victor Herbert	Lambda (1913)	Tin Pan Alley composer; co-founder and vice-president of ASCAP	
Alan Hovhaness	Delta Omicron (1949)	Prolific Armenian-American composer, with over 500 surviving works	
Karel Husa	Alpha Alpha (1977)	Awarded the Pulitzer Prize for his String Quartet No. 3 in 1969; known for Music for Prague 1968	
Gail T. Kubik	Alpha Nu (1934)	Won the 1952 Pulitzer Prize for Music for Symphony Concertante	
Krzysztof Penderecki	Epsilon Iota (1975)	Received a Grammy Award for Best Choral Performance for Credo in 2001	
Vincent Persichetti	Delta Eta (1961)	Awarded the University of Pennsylvania Glee Club Award of Merit in 1984	
Peter Schickele	Gamma Epsilon (1974)	Composer and comedian, best known by the pseudonym P.D.Q. Bach	
Arnold Schoenberg	Alpha Epsilon (1935)	Developed the twelve-tone technique of composition	

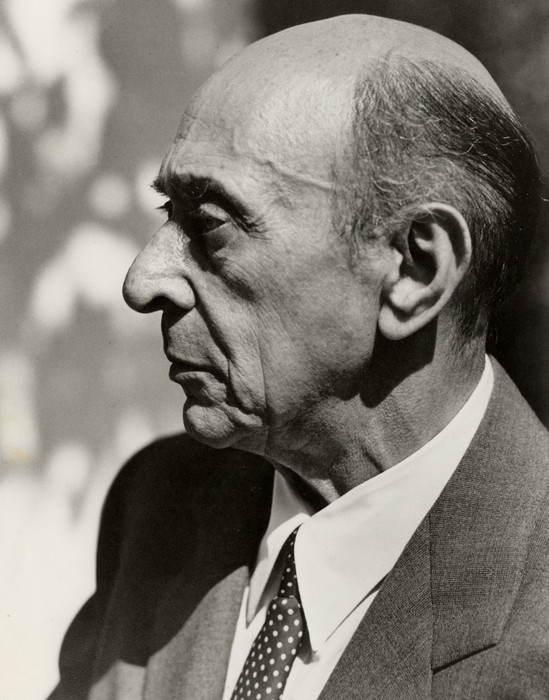
Arnold Schoenberg, Alpha Epsilon Honorary 1935

== Conductors ==
=== Band/winds ===
Name	Original chapter	Notability	Ref.
Leonard Falcone	Gamma Epsilon (1940)	Long-time director of bands at Michigan State University; scholarship endowments were established in his honor at Michigan State University, Blue Lake Fine Arts Camp, and the Falcone International Tuba and Euphonium Festival	
Frederick Fennell	Alpha Nu (1934)	Widely regarded as the leader of the wind ensemble movement in the US; recipient of the Charles E. Lutton Man of Music Award in 2003	
George N. Parks	Rho Sigma (1974)	Founder of the George N. Parks Drum Major Academy, a summer workshop program for high school drum majors	
William Revelli	Alpha Lambda (1935)	Long-time sirector of bands at the University of Michigan; recipient of the Charles E. Lutton Man of Music Award in 1994 (awarded posthumously, as he died one month before the National Convention)	
Thomas Tyra	Iota (1953)	Director of bands at Louisiana State University and Eastern Michigan University; later dean at Crane School of Music; created the LSU Golden Girls Dance Line and wrote lyrics and music for many university spirit songs, including Northwestern's alma mater	
Anthony A. Mitchell	Eta Theta (1965)	Director of the United States Navy Band 1962–1968	

=== Choral ===
Name	Original chapter	Notability	Ref.
Charles Bruffy	**Nu Gamma (1981)**	Grammy Award-winning director of the Kansas City Chorale and Phoenix Chorale; chorus director of the Kansas City Symphony	
Norman Luboff	Alpha Nu (1963)	Founder and director of the Norman Luboff Choir; has a star on the Hollywood Walk of Fame	
Daniel Moe	Epsilon Zeta (1957)	Director of choral organizations for the University of Iowa, professor of choral conducting at Oberlin Conservatory of Music, and founding music director of Key Chorale in Sarasota, Florida	
Robert Porco	Beta Xi (1962)	Director of the Cincinnati May Festival Chorus with the Cincinnati Symphony Orchestra 1989–2024 along with the Cleveland Orchestra's Blossom Festival Chorus	
Robert Shaw	Alpha Chi (1945)	Recipient of 14 Grammy Awards; Kennedy Center honoree in 1991	
John Finley Williamson	Alpha Theta (1925)	Founder of Westminster Choir; co-founder of Westminster Choir College	

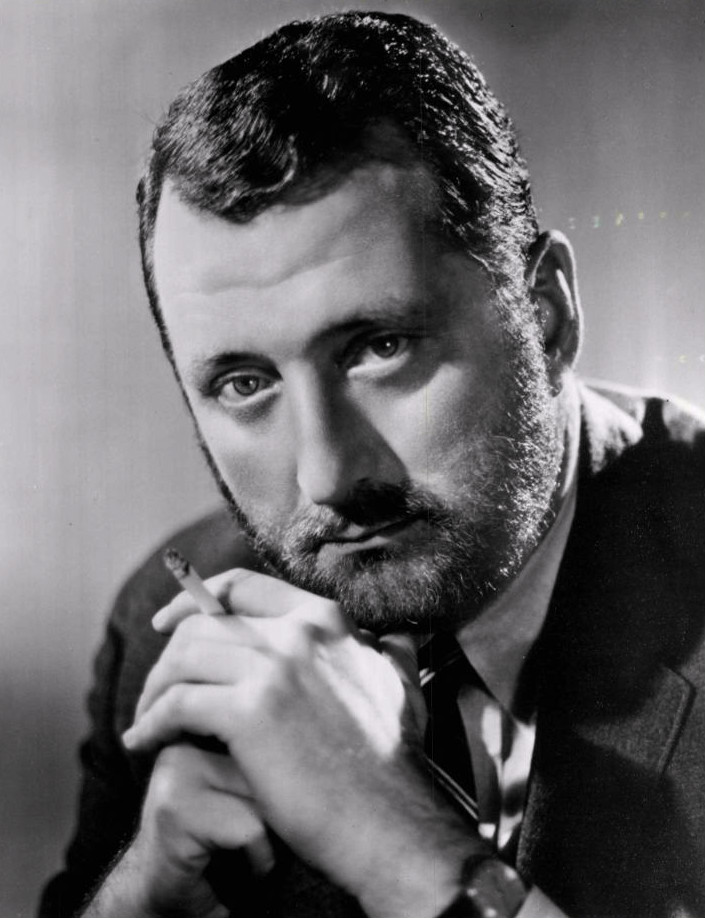
Norman Luboff in 1963

=== Symphonic ===
Name	Original chapter	Notability	Ref.
Arthur Fiedler	Delta Omicron (1950)	Long-time conductor of the Boston Pops Orchestra; awarded the University of Pennsylvania Glee Club Award of Merit in 1976, and the Presidential Medal of Freedom in 1977	
Erich Kunzel	Eta-Omicron (1969)	Long-time conductor of the Cincinnati Pops Orchestra; awarded the National Medal of Arts in 2006	
James Levine	Alpha Alpha (1979)	Conducted the Chicago Symphony Orchestra on the soundtrack of Fantasia 2000; Kennedy Center honoree in 2002; recipient of the Charles E. Lutton Man of Music Award in 1979	
Pierre Monteaux	Alpha (1919)	Conducted the world premieres of Stravinsky's The Rite of Spring and other prominent works, including Petrushka, Ravel's Daphnis et Chloé, and Debussy's Jeux	
Leonard Slatkin	Alpha Alpha (1987)	Music director of the Saint Louis Symphony Orchestra and National Symphony Orchestra's conductor of the BBC Symphony Orchestra; recipient of the Charles E. Lutton Man of Music Award in 1997 and the National Medal of Arts in 2003	
Michael Tilson Thomas	Alpha Epsilon (1963)	Long-time music director of the San Francisco Symphony; recipient of the National Medal of Arts in 2009, and multiple Grammy Awards	

=== Television ===
Name / Original chapter / Notability / Ref.; Mort Lindsey / Beta Gamma (1948) / Orchestrator, composer, conductor and musical director for Judy Garland, Barbra Streisand and Merv Griffin; won a Grammy Award for Judy Garland at Carnegie Hall and an Emmy Award for Barbra Streisand in Central Park

== Educational administrators ==
Name	Original chapter	Notability	Ref.
Gilbert Raynolds Combs	**Beta (1900)**	Founded the Combs College of Music, originally called the Combs Broad Street Conservatory of Music; second supreme president of Phi Mu Alpha	
Charles Paul Conn	Pi Xi (2011)	President of Lee University, overseeing significant growth, both in student population and budget	
John Dunn	Delta Iota (2010)	President of Western Michigan University	
Diether Haenicke	Delta Iota (1993)	Former president of Western Michigan University; received an honorary degree from WMU in 1998	
Robert Hemenway	Xi (2011)	Former chancellor of the University of Kansas	
Charles S. Johnson	**Zeta Rho (1953)**	First black president of historically black Fisk University; civil rights advocate	
Aubrey K. Lucas	Eta Phi (1977)	Former president of the University of Southern Mississippi; oversaw major changes in the structure of the university	
James Moeser	Alpha Iota (1958)	Former chancellor of the University of North Carolina at Chapel Hill	
Jay F. W. Pearson	Beta Tau (1953)	Marine biologist; second president of the University of Miami, 1952–1962	
J. Wayne Reitz	Eta Omega (1990)	Economist; fifth president of the University of Florida, 1955–1967	
James M. Simmons	Theta Rho (1963)	President of Lamar University; a Signature Sinfonian	
Graham Spanier	Alpha Zeta (1998)	Former president of Pennsylvania State University	
William B. Langsdorf	Omicron Pi (1966)	First president of Orange County State College, 1959–1970	

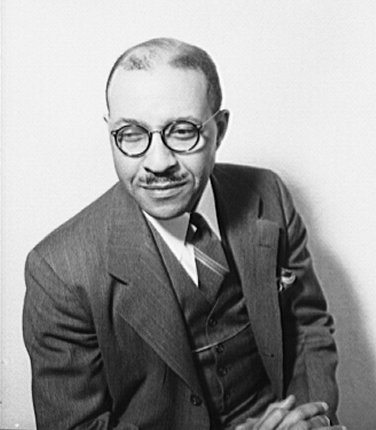
Charles S. Johnson c.1953

== Folk singers ==
Name	Original chapter	Notability	Ref.
Burl Ives	Alpha Chi (1953)	Singer, actor; portrayed Sam the Snowman in the stop-motion special Rudolph the Red-Nosed Reindeer; awarded the University of Pennsylvania Glee Club Award of Merit in 1975	
Earl Robinson	Sigma (1931)	Writer of progressive folk songs such as "Joe Hill", "Ballad for Americans", and "The House I Live In"; blacklisted by the House Un-American Activities Committee for his leftist political sympathies	

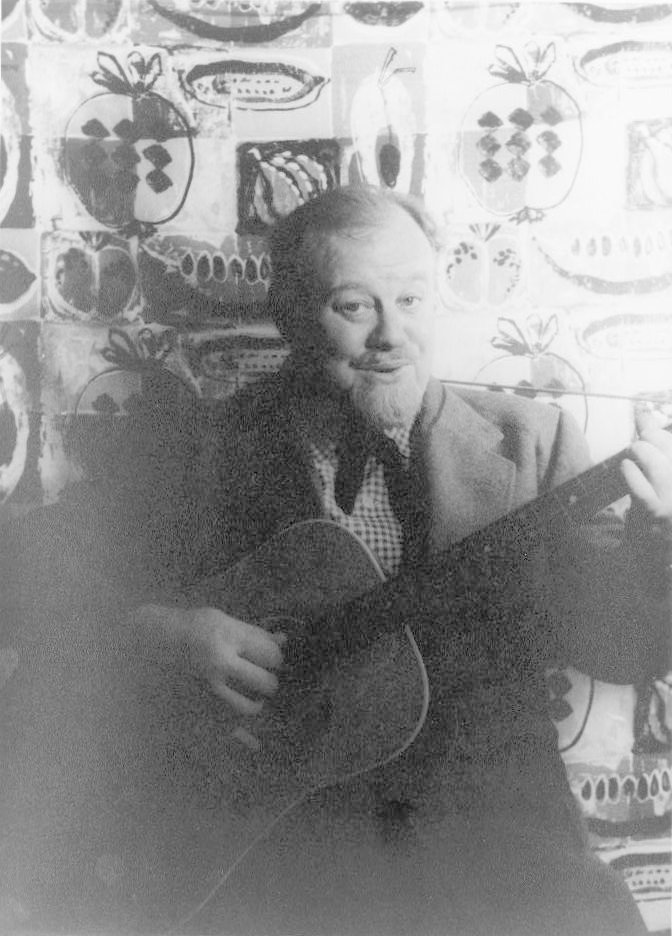
Burl Ives c.1955

== Government leaders ==
Name	Original chapter	Notability	Ref.
David L. Boren	Mu (2003)	Former governor of Oklahoma, former US senator, and former president of the University of Oklahoma	
George B. Cortelyou	Alpha Alpha (1903)	First US secretary of commerce and labor; served as US postmaster general and US secretary of the treasury	
Thomas Dewey	Epsilon (1920)	Former governor of New York; Republican candidate for president of the United States in 1944 and 1948	
Fiorello La Guardia	Beta Gamma (1941)	Former congressman from New York; former mayor of New York	
Joshua B. Lee	Mu (1917)	Former US senator from Oklahoma	
James G. Martin	Gamma Kappa (1955)	Former US congressman from North Carolina; former governor of North Carolina	

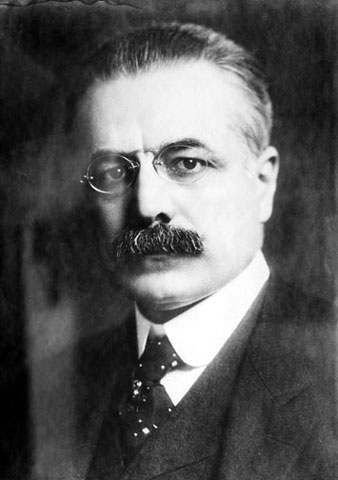
George B. Cortelyou c.1905-07

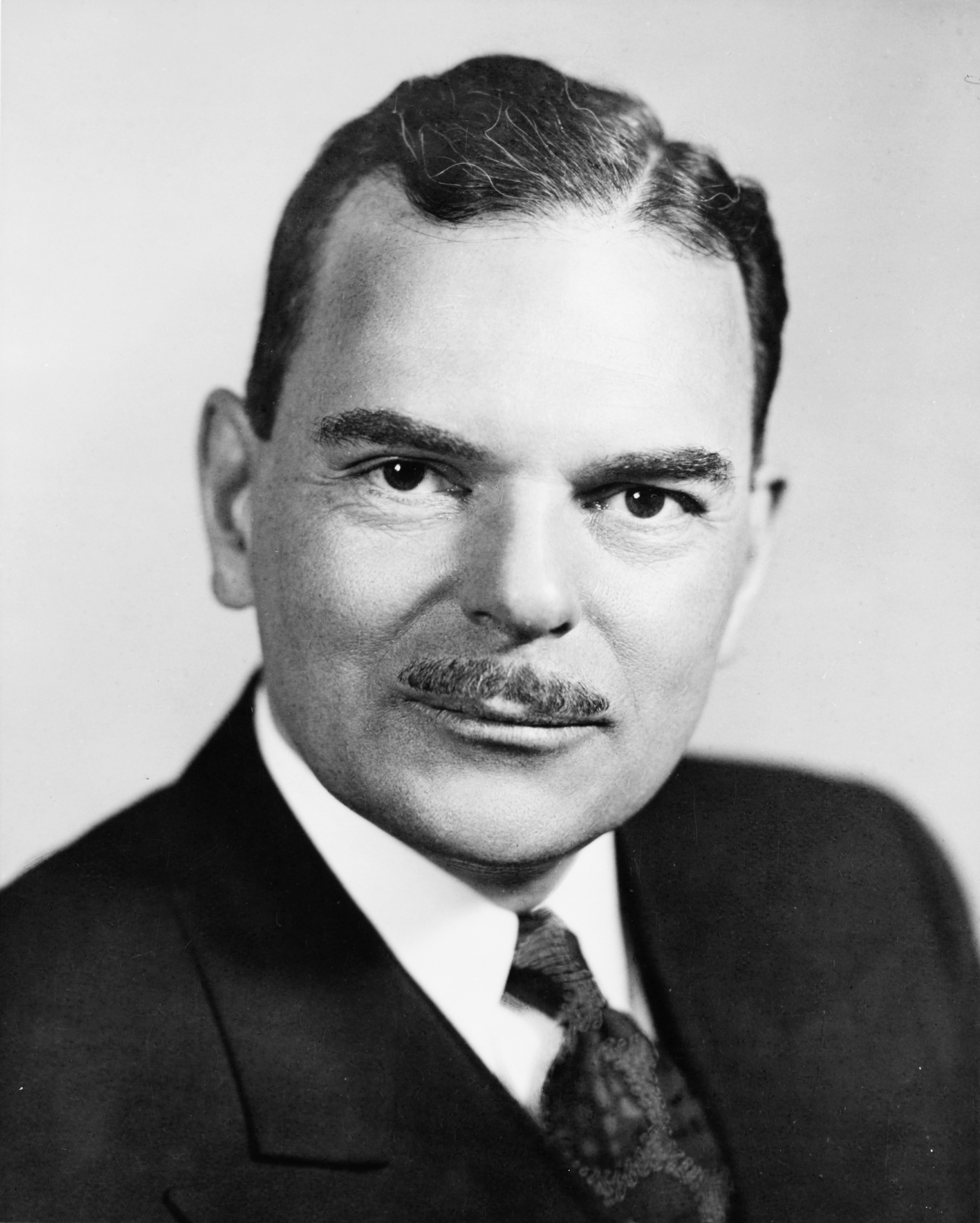
Thomas E. Dewey c.1948

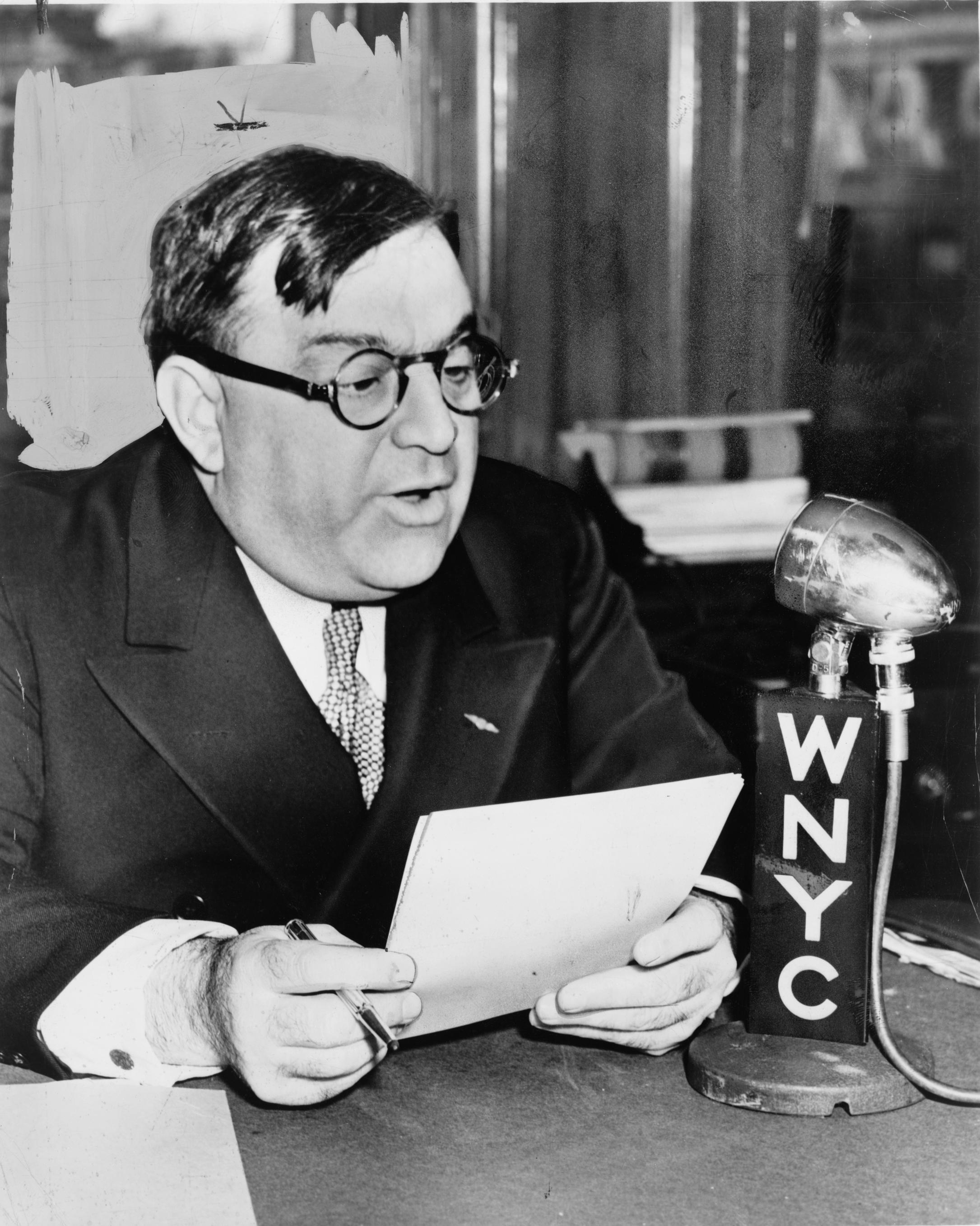
Fiorello La Guardia c.1940

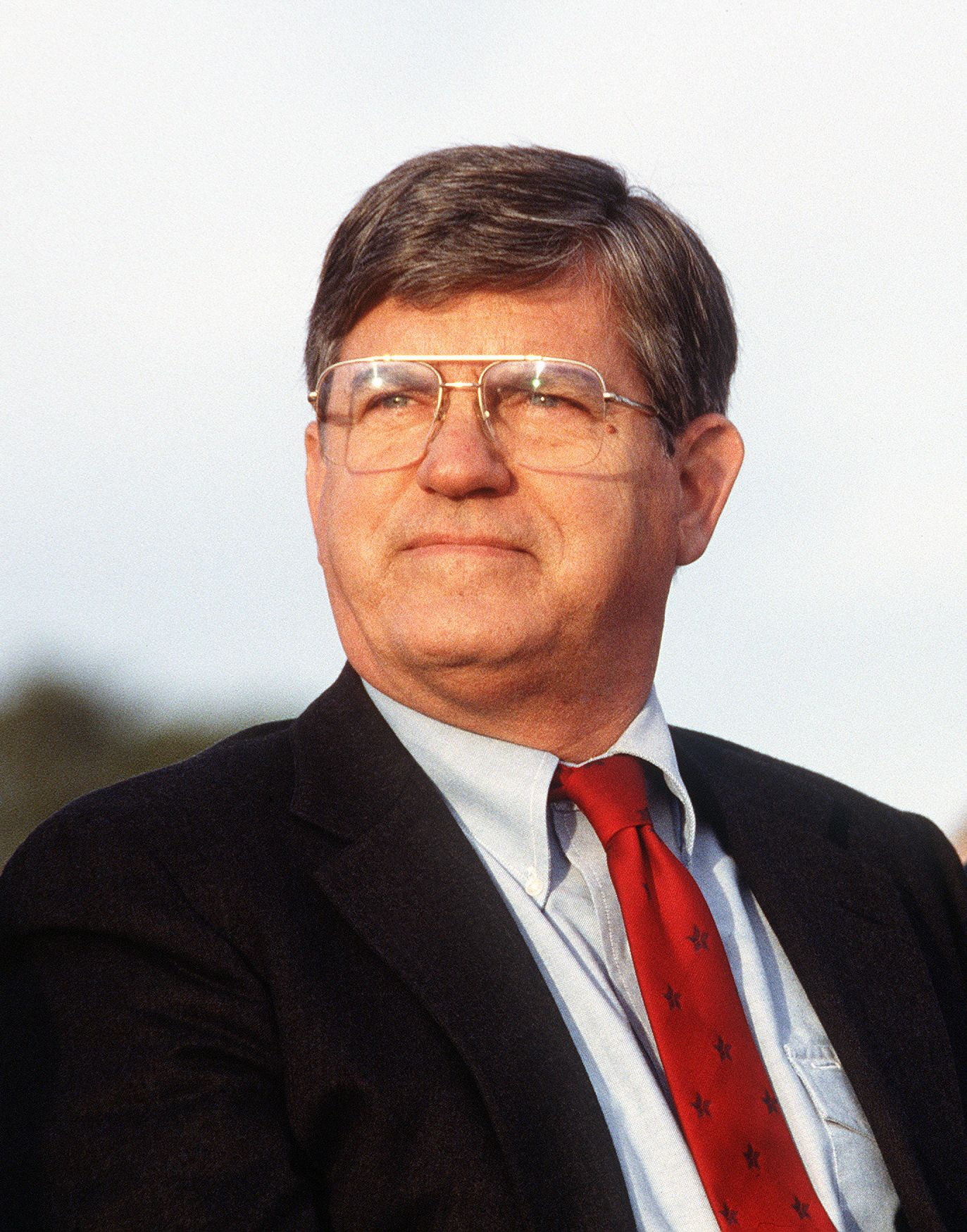
James G. Martin c.1988

== Instrumentalists ==
=== Miscellaneous ===
Name	Original chapter	Notability	Ref.
Pablo Casals	Epsilon Iota (1963)	Cellist; conductor; recipient of the Grammy Lifetime Achievement Award, Presidential Medal of Freedom in 1963, and the Charles E. Lutton Man of Music Award in 1973	
Philip Farkas	Rho Chi (1971)	French horn player; wrote several widely used books on horn playing; designed the Holton-Farkas horn	
Vic Firth	Alpha (1950)	Founder of Vic Firth drum stick company	
Carlos Montoya	Alpha Alpha (1975)	Spanish-born Flamenco guitarist; brought the style of playing into the mainstream	
Albert Tipton	Alpha Chi (1934)	Flautist, pianist and conductor; in 1966, Time magazine placed Tipton amongst the "30 first-rate flutists" in the United States and Europe	

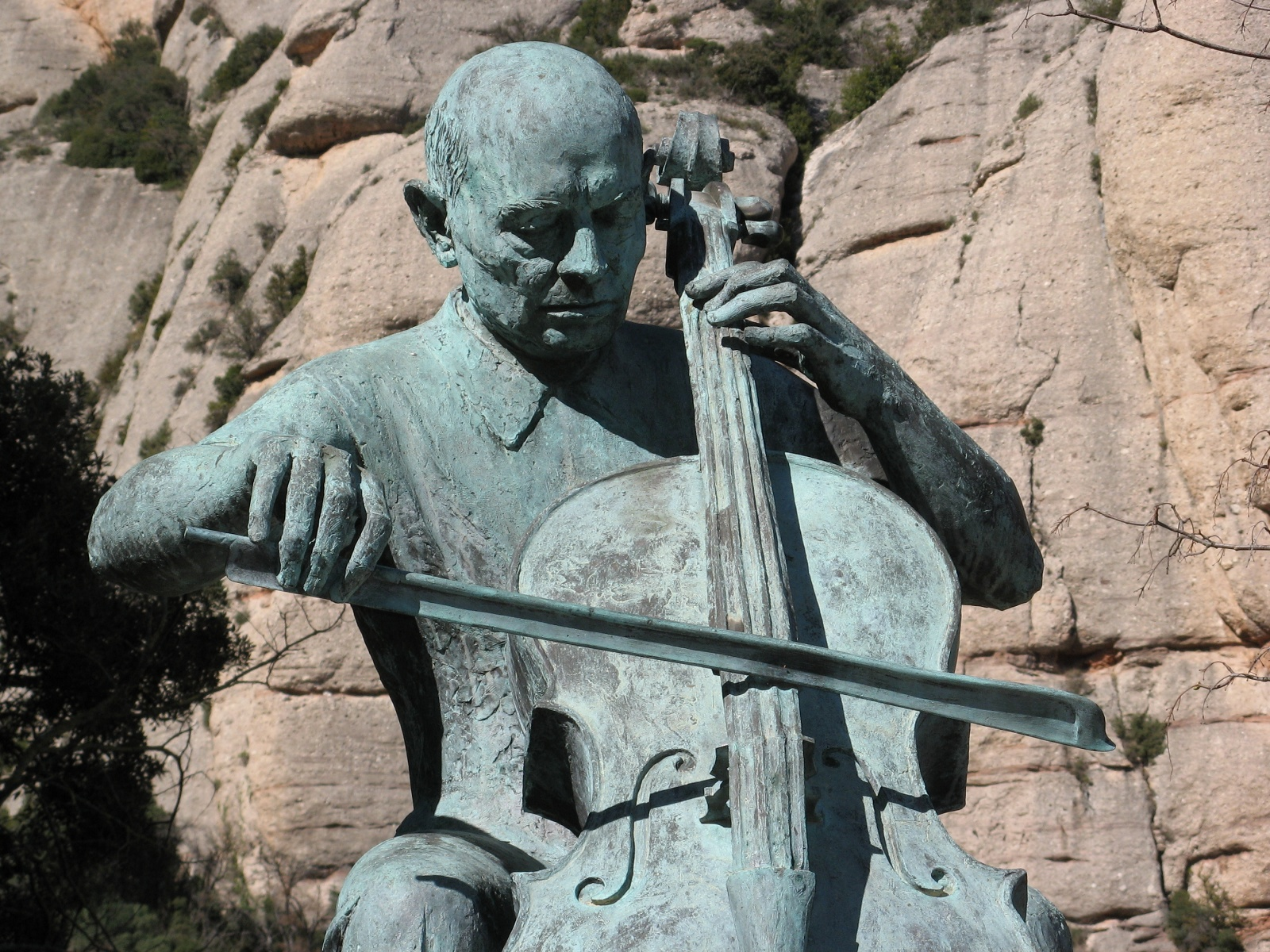
Statue of Pablo Casals at Montserrat, Spain

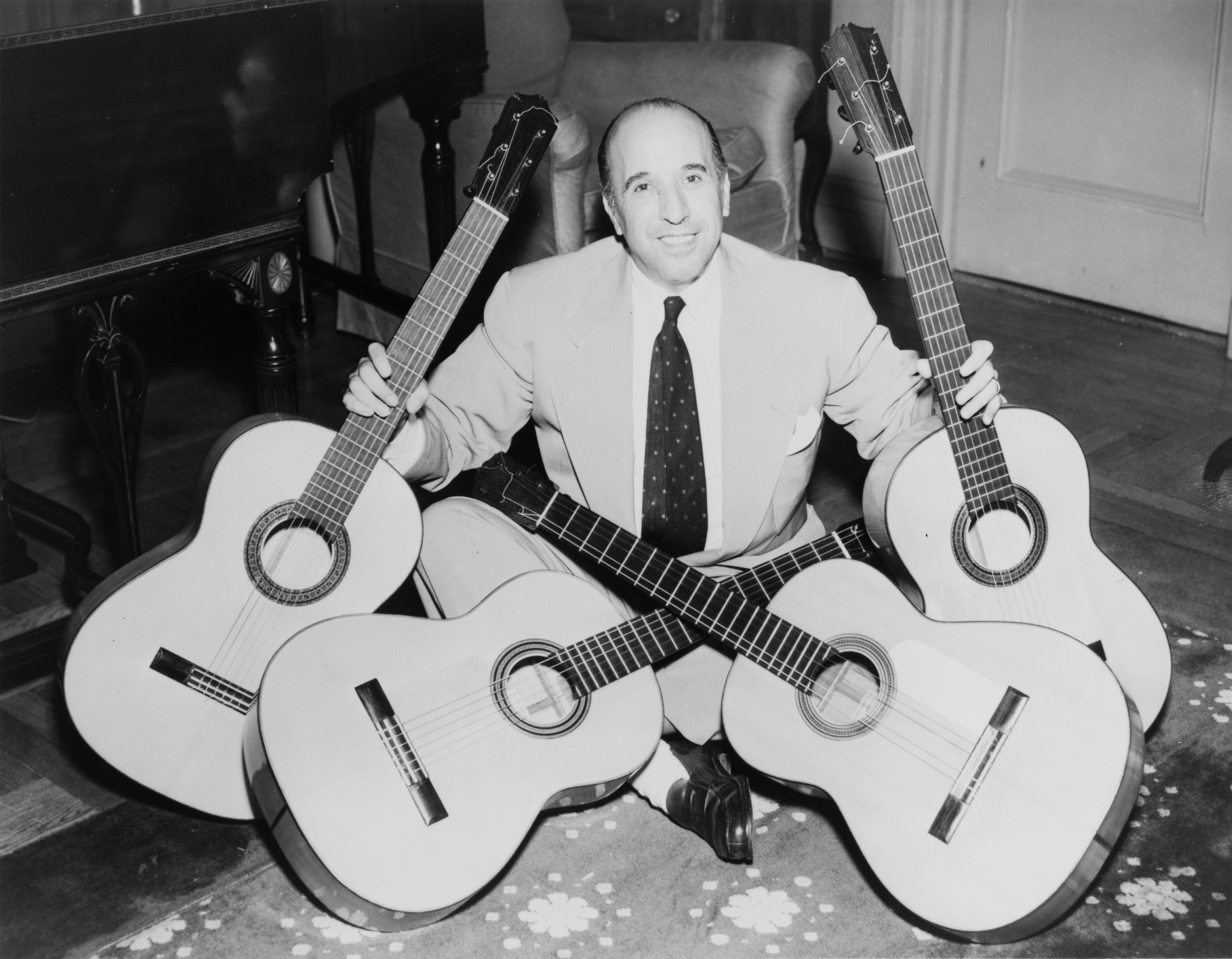
Carlos Montoya c.1954

=== Organists ===
Name	Original chapter	Notability	Ref.
E. Power Biggs	Beta Delta (1957)	Sparked a renewal of the classical pipe organ during the 1950s; has a star on the Hollywood Walk of Fame	
Joseph Bonnet	Alpha (1917)	Composer, educator; founded the organ department at the Eastman School of Music	
Marcel Dupré	Alpha (1924)	Composer, educator; known for performing more than 2000 organ recitals throughout Australia, the US, Canada and Europe	

=== Other ===
Name / Original chapter / Notability / Ref.; Arna Bontemps / Zeta Rho (1954) / Poet, member of the Harlem Renaissance

=== Pianists ===
Name	Original chapter	Notability	Ref.
Van Cliburn	Alpha Chi (1958) Alpha Alpha (1962)	Pianist who achieved worldwide recognition in 1958, when at age 23, he won the first International Tchaikovsky Competition in Moscow, at the height of the Cold War; awarded the Charles E. Lutton Man of Music Award in 1962, the Kennedy Center Honors in 2001, the Presidential Medal of Freedom in 2003, a Grammy Lifetime Achievement Award in 2004, and the National Medal of Arts in 2010	
Rudolph Ganz	Zeta (1924)	Performer, conductor, composer, and educator	
Leopold Godowsky	Beta (1900)	Performer, composer, educator; advanced piano playing technique	
Morton Gould	Alpha Delta (1947)	Composer, conductor, arranger, and performer; a Kennedy Center honoree in 1994; has a star on the Hollywood Walk of Fame; awarded the Pulitzer Prize for Music in 1995, and the Grammy Lifetime Achievement Award in 2005	
Josef Hofmann	Alpha (1917)	Performer, composer, music teacher, and inventor	
Peter Nero	Gamma Omega (1962)	Conductor and Grammy Award-winning pianist	
André Previn, KBE	Zeta Mu (1967)	Pianist, conductor, and composer; winner of multiple Grammy and Academy Awards; appointed an honorary Knight Commander of the Order of the British Empire in 1996; a Kennedy Center honoree in 1998; received the Grammy Lifetime Achievement Award in 2010	
Sergei Rachmaninoff	Alpha (1919)	Conductor, composer, and pianist	
Roger Williams	Alpha Beta (1943)	Concert pianist; recorded the only piano instrumental (Autumn Leaves) to reach #1 on Billboard's popular music chart	

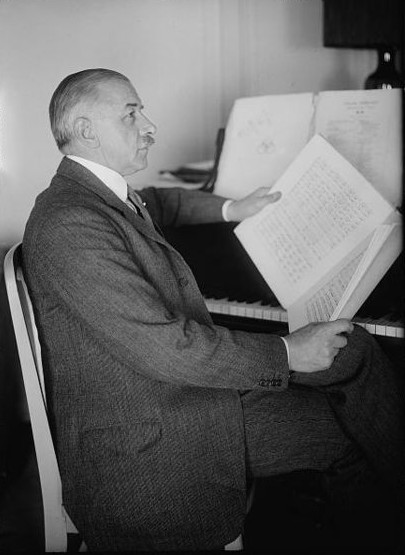
Rudolph Ganz

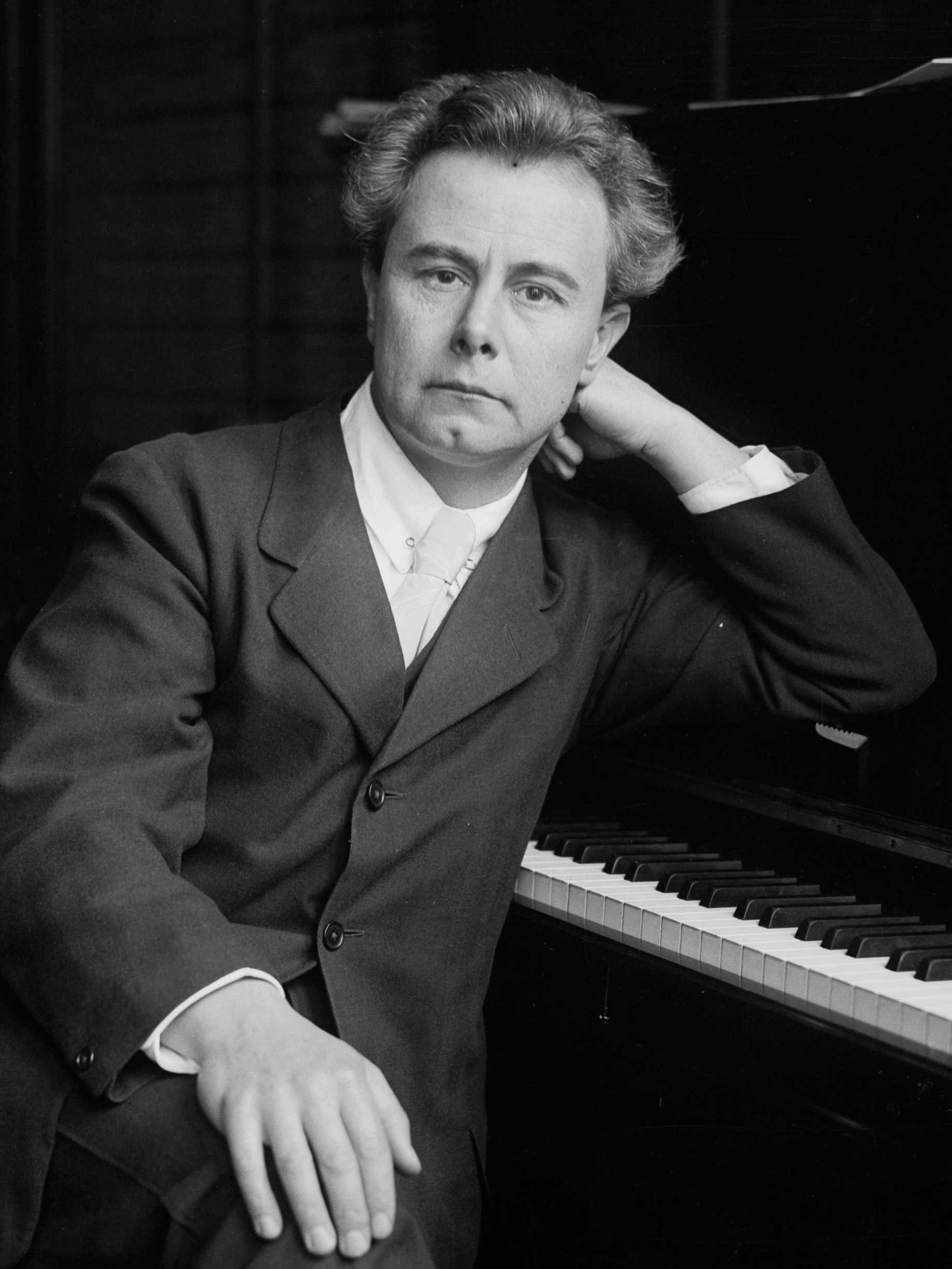
Josef Hofmann

=== Trumpeters ===
Name	Original chapter	Notability	Ref.
Maurice André	Delta (1970)	Trumpeter, prolific recording artist	
Roger Voisin	Alpha (1951)	Classical trumpeter; in 1959, The New York Times called him "one of the best-known trumpeters in this country"	

=== Saxophonists ===
Name	Original chapter	Notability	Ref.
Sigurd Raschèr	Delta (1951)	Saxophonist; pioneer of saxophone literature and voicing on the saxophone	
Eugene Rousseau	Iota Gamma (2006)	Saxophonist; co-founder of the World Saxophone Congress	

=== Violinists ===
Name	Original chapter	Notability	Ref.
Mischa Elman	Alpha (1917)	Ukrainian-born violinist famed for his passionate style and beautiful tone	
Jascha Heifetz	Alpha (1917)	Listed by Time magazine as one of the most influential violinists of the twentieth century; awarded the Grammy Lifetime Achievement Award (posthumously) in 1989; has a star on the Hollywood Walk of Fame	
Eugène Ysaÿe	Alpha (1917)	Performer, composer, educator, conductor; known as "king of the violin"	
Efrem Zimbalist	Alpha (1917)	Performer, composer, educator, and conductor	

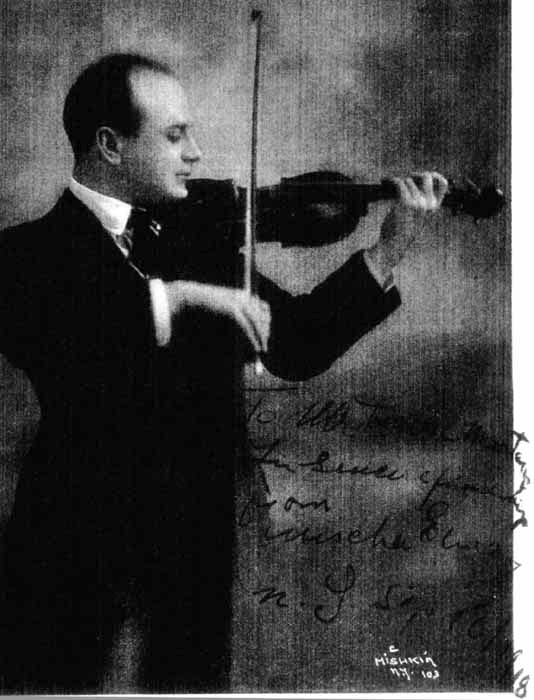
Mischa Elman

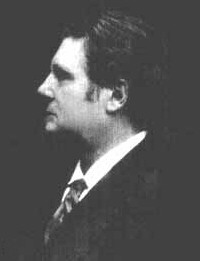
Eugène Ysaÿe

== Jazz artists ==
Name	Original chapter	Notability	Ref.
Julian "Cannonball" Adderley	Gamma Theta (1960) Xi Omega (1970)	Saxophonist and bandleader	
Jamey Aebersold	Gamma Omega (1976)	Saxophonist and music educator; known for his jazz improvisation education	
Count Basie	Mu Nu (1970)	Pianist, bandleader; 1981 Kennedy Center honoree; has a star on the Hollywood Walk of Fame; Grammy Lifetime Achievement Award recipient	
Alvin Batiste	Mu Psi (1973)	Avant-garde clarinetist	
Alan Baylock	Nu Psi (2016)	Composer, arranger, educator, bandleader, clinician, instrumentalist and bandleader	
Louie Bellson	Xi Omega (1994)	Drummer; invented the double bass drum at age 15	
Kenny Burrell	Gamma Omicron (1953)	Jazz guitarist and educator	
Henry Butler	Mu Psi (1969)	Blind pianist	
Bill Cunliffe	Omicron Pi (2010)	Grammy Award-winning pianist and composer	
Duke Ellington	Rho Upsilon (1969) Gamma Delta (1969) Alpha Alpha	Pianist and bandleader; has a star on the Hollywood Walk of Fame; recipient of the Presidential Medal of Freedom in 1969, and the Grammy Lifetime Achievement Award in 1966	
Bill Evans	Delta Omega (1949)	Pianist and composer; posthumously awarded the Grammy Lifetime Achievement Award in 1994	
Maynard Ferguson	Xi Chi (1976)	Trumpeter and bandleader; recipient of the 2006 Charles E. Lutton Man of Music Award	
Donald Harrison Jr.	Mu Psi (1979)	Saxophonist and orchestral composer	
Stan Kenton	Gamma Epsilon (1961)	Pianist, composer, arranger, and bandleader	
Tom "Bones" Malone	Gamma Theta (2001)	Member of The Blues Brothers band; member of the CBS Orchestra, the house band for the Late Show with David Letterman; former arranger for Saturday Night Live	
Chuck Mangione	Alpha Nu (1971)	Flugelhornist and bandleader	
Shelly Manne	Omicron Pi (1969)	Drummer, frequently associated with West Coast jazz	
Branford Marsalis	Mu Psi (1979)	Saxophonist; former bandleader of the Tonight Show Band on The Tonight Show with Jay Leno	
Ellis Marsalis, Jr.	Epsilon Lambda (1965)	Louisiana Music Hall of Fame jazz pianist and music educator; father of Branford and Wynton Marsalis; recipient of the Charles E. Lutton Man of Music Award in 2015	
Mike Metheny	Upsilon Phi (1974)	Flugelhornist and music journalist	
Doc Severinsen	Eta Lambda (1965)	Trumpeter; former bandleader of the NBC Orchestra (later the Tonight Show Band) on The Tonight Show Starring Johnny Carson	
Clark Terry	Beta Zeta (1968)	Trumpeter; recipient of the Charles E. Lutton Man of Music Award in 1985 and the Grammy Lifetime Achievement Award in 2010	
George Wein	Delta Omicron (1954)	Jazz promoter and producer; founder of the Newport Jazz Festival	
Kirk Whalum	Kappa Delta (1978)	Saxophonist and songwriter; won a Grammy Award in 2011 for Best Gospel Song	

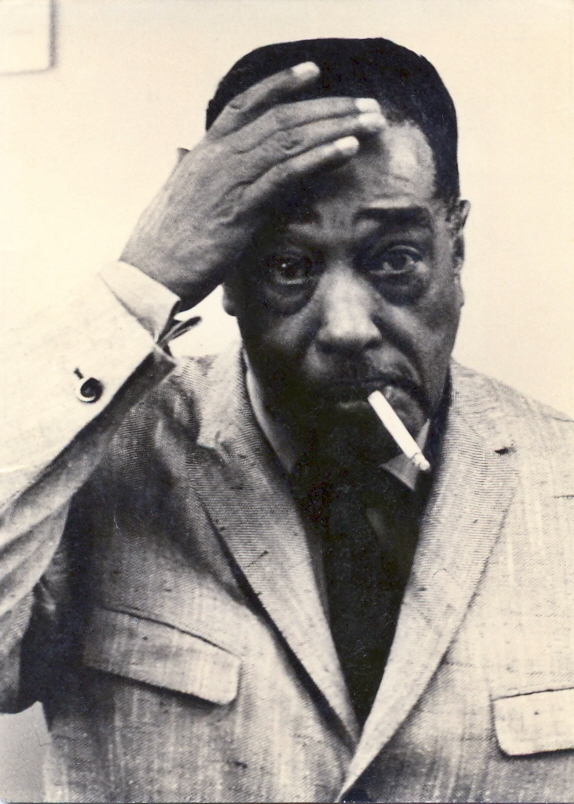
Duke Ellington c. 1965

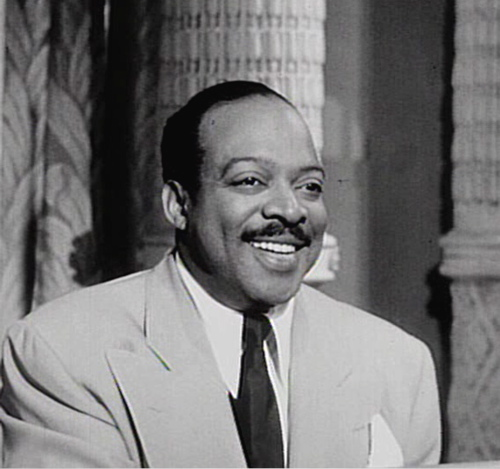
Count Basie c. 1955

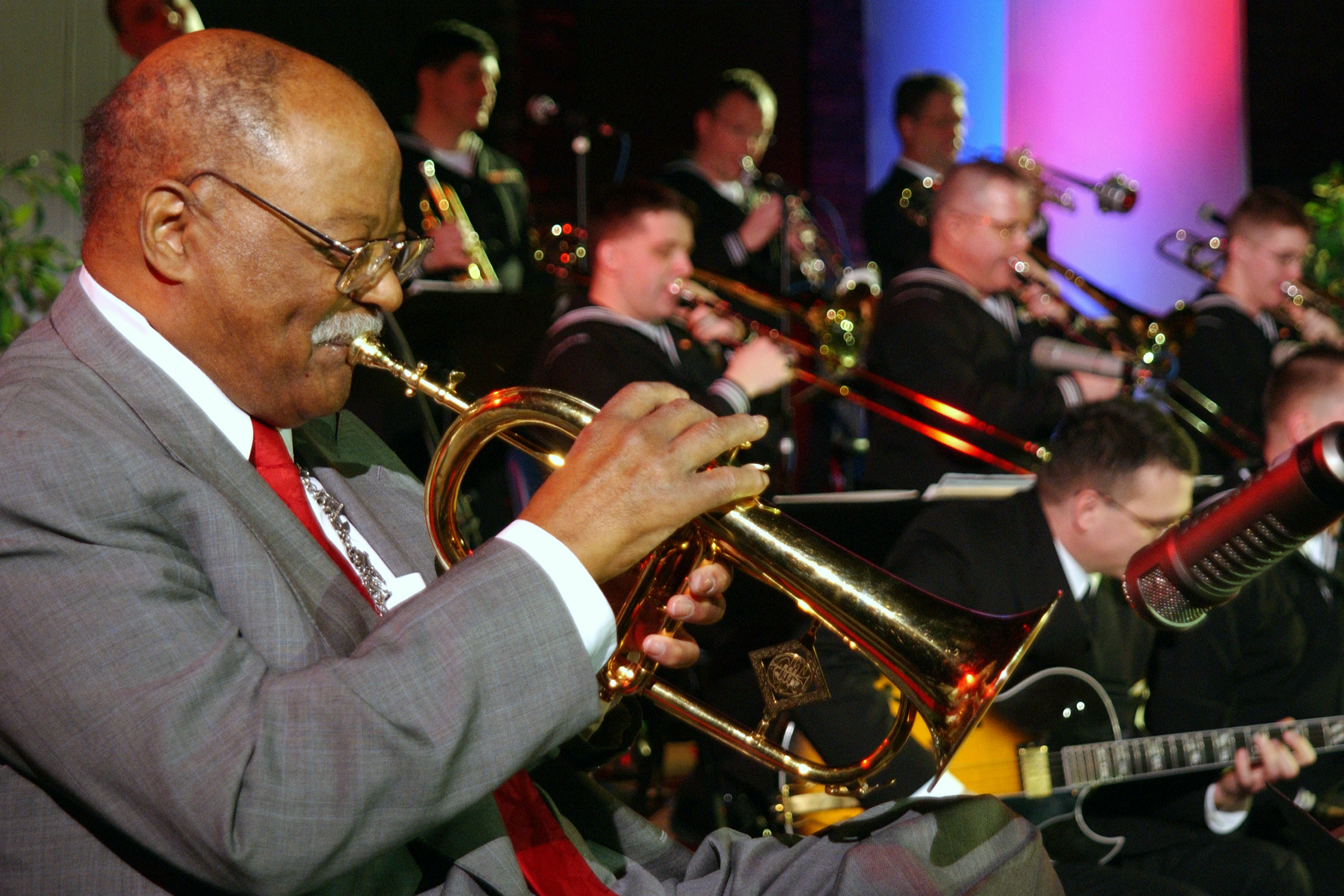
Clark Terry performs with the Great Lakes Navy Band Jazz Ensemble, 2002

== Music critics and editors ==
Name	Original chapter	Notability	Ref.
Richard Aldrich	Alpha (1917)	Music critic for The New York Times	
Olin Downes	Alpha (1917)	Music critic for The Boston Post and The New York Times; host of the Metropolitan Opera Quiz	
Henry Finck	Alpha (1917)	Music editor for the New York Evening Post	
Paul Hume	Alpha Alpha (1971)	Musicologist; music editor for The Washington Post; awarded the University of Pennsylvania Glee Club Award of Merit in 1979	
James Gibbons Huneker	Alpha (1917)	Music writer; music critic for The New York Sun	
Henry Edward Krehbiel	Alpha (1917)	Musicologist; music editor for the New-York Tribune	

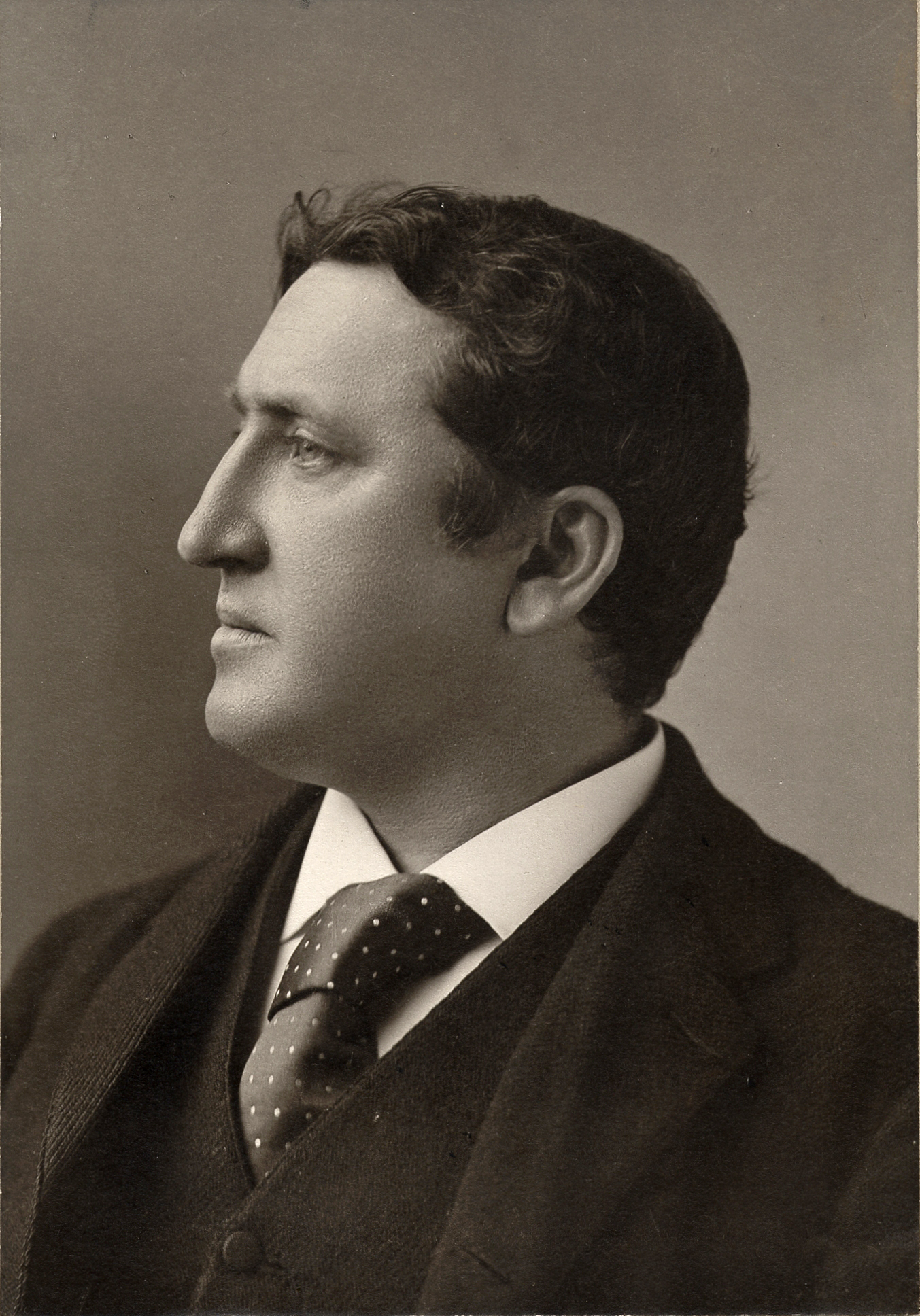
James Huneker c. 1890

== Music educators ==
Name	Original chapter	Notability	Ref.
Frank Damrosch	Alpha (1917)	Founder of the Juilliard School in 1905	
William P. Foster	Beta Gamma (1953) Omicron Gamma	Revolutionised the marching band at Florida A&M University, calling them the "Marching 100"	
Edwin Gordon	Alpha Kappa (1955)	Music educator; developer of the Gordon Music Learning Theory	
John Wesley Work III	**Zeta Rho (1953)**	Composer, educator, choral director, and scholar of African American folklore and music	

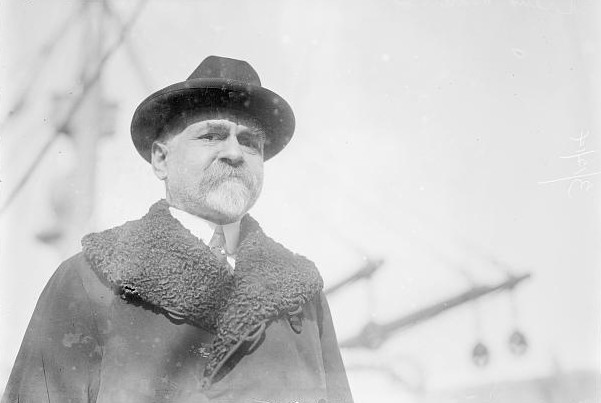
Frank Heino Damrosch

== Musicologists ==
Name	Original chapter	Notability	Ref.
Percy Goetschius	Alpha (1917)	Advanced composition theory, including the development of the theory of harmonic progression	
Sigmund Spaeth	**Iota (1910)**	Composer and musicologist; traced the sources and origins of popular songs to their folk and classical roots; recipient of the Charles E. Lutton Man of Music Award in 1958	
Michael J. Budds	Zeta	Musicologist and longtime professor at the University of Missouri School of Music; author; first musicologist inducted into the Missouri Music Hall of Fame	
Charles Seeger	Alpha (1917)	Professor of musicology at UCLA, administrator for the Federal Music Project, father of Pete Seeger	

== Peace activists ==
Name / Original chapter / Notability / Ref.; Thomas W. Fox / Gamma Psi (1971) / Kidnapped in November 2005 in Baghdad, leading to the Christian Peacemaker hostage crisis; was found dead in 2006

== Radio, film and television personalities ==
Name	Original chapter	Notability	Ref.
Alan Bergman	Alpha Rho (1943)	Songwriter; inducted into the Songwriters Hall of Fame in 1980; awarded an honorary doctorate by the Berklee College of Music in 1995	
Monét X Change	Rho Kappa (2009)	Professional drag queen and singer; crowned Miss Congeniality on Season 10 of RuPaul's Drag Race and winner of Season 4 of RuPaul's Drag Race All Stars	
Frank De Vol	Gamma Omega (1962)	Arranger, composer and actor; recognized for his theme tunes for television shows Family Affair, The Brady Bunch, and My Three Sons; acted in several TV series, includingI Dream of Jeannie, Bonanza, and The Brady Bunch	
Woody Durham	Alpha Rho (1961)	Longtime radio announcer for UNC basketball and football, known as the "Voice of the Tar Heels"	
Nelson Eddy	Zeta (1936)	Actor and singer who starred in 19 musical films during the 1930s-40s; has three stars on the Hollywood Walk of Fame	
Art Gilmore	Chi (1934)	Announcer and narrator for several television and radio programs, including Amos 'n' Andy, The Red Skelton Show, and The World Tomorrow	
Andy Griffith	Alpha Rho (1945)	Actor and singer best known for his lead roles in The Andy Griffith Show and Matlock; has a star on the Hollywood Walk of Fame; received the Presidential Medal of Freedom in 2005	
Wayne Messmer	Alpha Lambda (1970)	Professional speaker, singer, radio broadcaster, author and actor; longtime announcer for the Chicago Cubs; well-known for singing "The Star-Spangled Banner" for various Chicago sports teams; named as a Signature Sinfonian in 2010; given a World Series ring by the Cubs for the 2016 World Series	
Mitch Miller	Alpha Nu (1929)	Host of the 1960s community-sing television program Sing Along With Mitch; awarded the Grammy Lifetime Achievement Award in 2000	
Fred Rogers	Xi Psi (1987)	Creator and host of Mister Rogers' Neighborhood; has a star on the Hollywood Walk of Fame; named a Pittsburgh Penguins Celebrity Captain in 1991; awarded the Presidential Medal of Freedom in 2002	
J.K. Simmons	Delta Theta (1975)	Actor known for Whiplash and The Legend of Korra, as well as playing J. Jonah Jameson in multiple Spider-Man movies; won the Academy Award for Best Supporting Actor at the 87th Academy Awards	
Fred Waring	Alpha Zeta (1956)	Bandleader; host of The Fred Waring Show; has a star on the Hollywood Walk of Fame; awarded the Congressional Gold Medal in 1983	

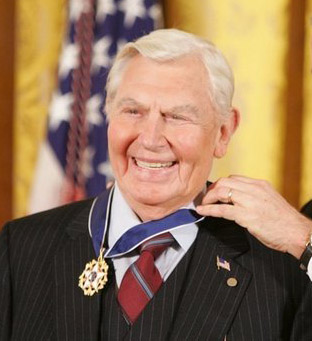
Andy Griffith c. 2005

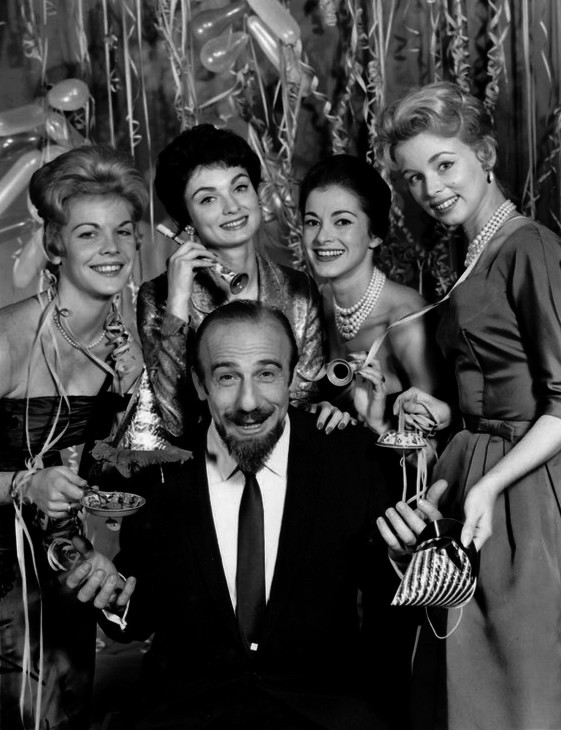
Mitch Miller c. 1961

== Rock and/or pop musicians ==
Name	Original chapter	Notability	Ref.
Joe Bouchard	Delta (1967)	Former bass player for Blue Öyster Cult	
Bo Diddley	Eta Omega (1999)	Rock and roll pioneer; member of the Rock and Roll Hall of Fame; awarded the Grammy Lifetime Achievement Award in 1998	
Ben Folds	Beta Tau (2015)	Singer and songwriter; frontman of the Ben Folds Five	
Glenn Hughes	Kappa Pi (1969)	The original "biker" character in the disco group Village People	
Lee Loughnane	Kappa Phi (1965)	Founding member of the rock band Chicago; named as a Signature Sinfonian in 2009	
James Pankow	Kappa Phi (1966)	Founding member of Chicago; named as a Signature Sinfonian in 2009	
Walter Parazaider	Kappa Phi (1964)	Founding member of Chicago; named as a Signature Sinfonian in 2009	
Ruben Studdard	Omicron Delta (1997)	Pop singer, winner of the second season of American Idol	
Jimmy Webb	Pi Tau (1969)	Singer and songwriter; known for the songs "Up, Up and Away" and "By the Time I Get to Phoenix"; recipient of multiple Grammy Awards	

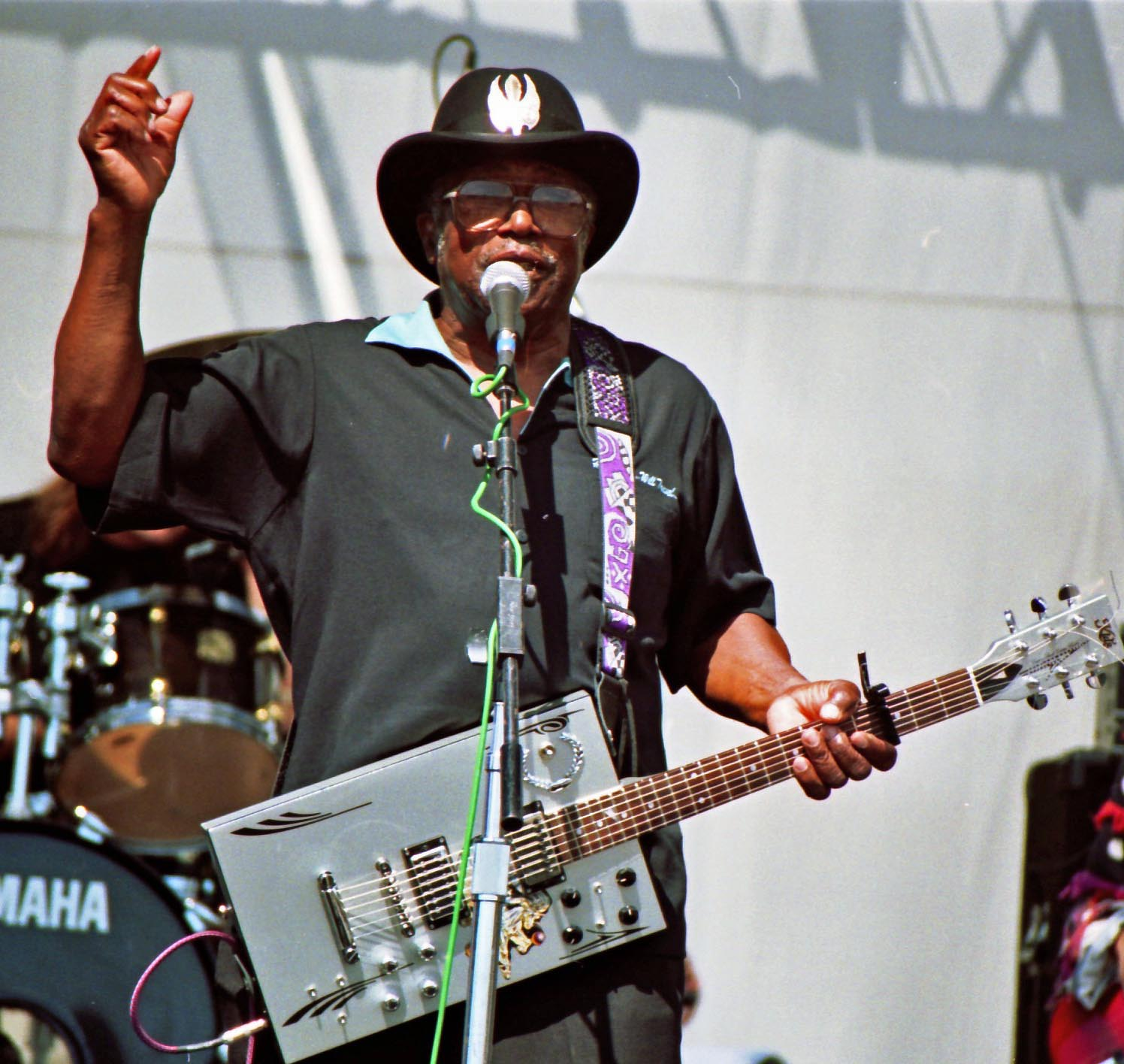
Bo Diddley c. 1997

== Scientists and scholars ==
- Capt. Winston E. Scott, 1950–present (Epsilon Iota 1970); member of the Space Shuttle Endeavour crew; senior vice president for External Relations and Economic Development, Florida Institute of Technology

== Visual artists ==
- Thomas Hart Benton (Alpha Psi honorary 1947)

== Vocalists ==
Name	Original chapter	Notability	Ref.
Pasquale Amato	Beta Omega (1939)	Operatic baritone who sang with the Metropolitan Opera in New York City 1908–1921	
David Bispham	Epsilon (1905)	First American–born operatic baritone to gain international notability	
Enrico Caruso	Alpha (1917)	Pioneer of recorded music; posthumously awarded the Grammy Lifetime Achievement Award in 1987	
Craig Colclough	Delta Pi (2001)	Bass-baritone with groups such as the Los Angeles Opera	
François Clemmons	Alpha Omega (1968)	Founder of the Harlem Spiritual Ensemble; frequent guest (as Officer Clemmons) on Mister Rogers' Neighborhood	
Rod Gilfry	Omicron Pi (1977)	Operatic baritone and Mozart specialist	
Jerry Hadley	Delta Nu (1971)	Grammy Award-winning operatic tenor	
Sherrill Milnes	Alpha Beta (1954)	Operatic baritone known for his Verdi roles; recipient of the Charles E. Lutton Man of Music Award in 1982	
Luciano Pavarotti	Beta Tau (1978)	Operatic tenor; humanitarian; known for bridging the gap between popular and classical music; Kennedy Center honoree in 2001	
Titta Ruffo	Alpha (1917)	Operatic baritone and prolific recording artist	
Antonio Scotti	Alpha (1917)	Principal baritone at the Metropolitan Opera	
Jacques Urlus	Alpha (1917)	Dramatic tenor famed for his recordings of the music of Richard Wagner	
William Warfield	Delta Lambda (1961)	Concert bass-baritone singer and actor; recipient of the Charles E. Lutton Man of Music Award in 1976	

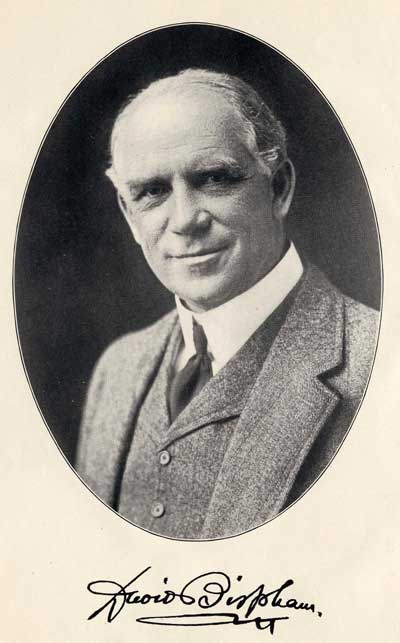
Baritone David Bispham c. 1920

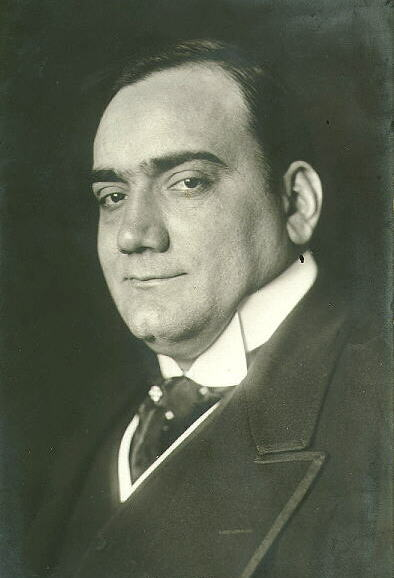
Enrico Caruso c. 1910
