= American Guitar Academy =

Coordinates: 35.7306°N 139.7621°E

The American Guitar Academy
- 2F MH Roppongi, 4-5-8 Roppongi; Minato-ku, Tokyo; Japan 116-0032 and 3-48-8 Sendagi; Bunkyo-Ku, Tokyo; Japan 113-0022; Japan

Information
- Established: 1991
- Website: www.東京ギター教室.com/english-page/

The American Guitar Academy was founded in the United States in 1991. It opened its first international location in Tokyo, Japan in 2011. It claimed to be the only guitar school in Japan offering classes in multiple languages including Japanese, English, Spanish, French, Italian, and German. American Guitar Academy teaches all styles of acoustic and electric guitar from Jazz, Rock, Blues, Pop, Funk, Classical, Flamenco, Tango, Folk and R&B and more.

== General information ==
As of October 2014 they opened their second branch in the Roppongi area. Currently they have 8 guitar teachers from 8 different countries. Their courses range from beginner to advanced level guitar classes in a private or group setting, guitar ensembles, a live performance workshop, music theory, sight singing and ear training for part their International Music School Program. Their International School Music Program prepares students who want to go overseas to study music at the university level. Their IMSP’s music theory and sight singing and ear training courses are open to all instruments, not just guitar.

Michael Kaplan, the current director of The American Guitar Academy, has published a book of bebop guitar transcriptions released by Berklee Press and Hal Leonard. He has also worked with Dr. Mike Diliddo and Jamey Aebersold on a guitar comping book.

The American Guitar Academy is currently in the process of working with Bill Edwards, the author of Fretboard Logic, as well as Truefire, one of the largest online video guitar lessons resources on the internet. They are consistently moving forward with new projects and look forward to continuing to change the landscape of guitar education in Japan.
