= Dizzy Sal =

Dizzy Sal (8 November 1934 – 25 July 1998), born Edward Saldanha, was an Indian jazz pianist. He was a student at the Lenox School of Jazz, and the Berklee School of Music. It is believed that he popularized jazz in Bollywood.

== Life ==
Saldanha was born in Rangoon, Burma, in 1934. Saldanha came from a musical family, three brothers played in a band in Kuwait. He made his début aged 5 on Radio Rangoon.

His meeting with Dave Brubeck is documented in the 2011 book Taj-Mahal Foxtrot, by Naresh Fernandes.

He performed his own Relaxin' At Music Inn as well as Wes Montgomery’s Jingles and Gary McFarland's Monk's Sphere and Summer Day, as part of the "Bill Evans, Jim Hall, Connie Kay Ensemble", at the third annual benefit concert at the Lennox School of Jazz, 29 August 1959.

Dizzy Sal brought jazz to Bollywood, according to Jazz researcher John J Langdon IV.

== Discography ==
- Jazz in the Classroom Volume 5: Haasan's Dream (1961) with Petar Spassov
- Ken McIntyre - Stone Blues
- Ornette Coleman - The Lenox Jazz School Concert: August 29, 1959 (2009)
