= John R. Bourgeois =

American conductor

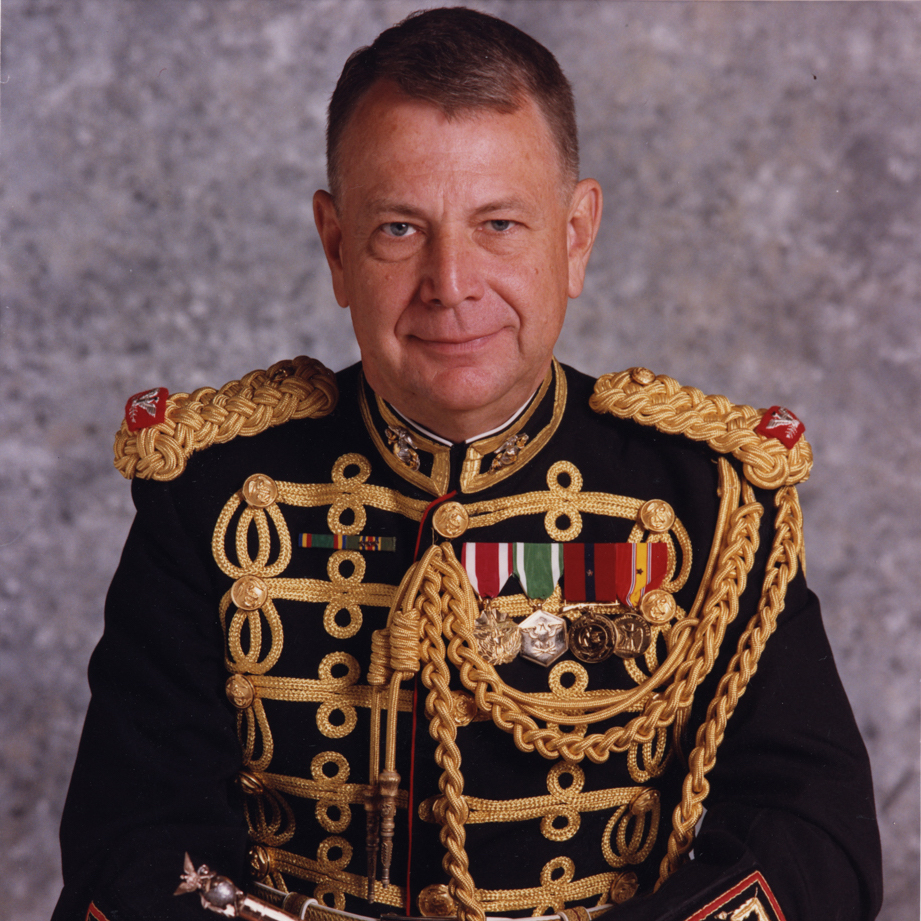
- Born: August 31, 1934 (age 91); Gibson, Louisiana, U.S.
- Allegiance: United States
- Branch: United States Marine Corps
- Service years: 1979–1996
- Rank: Colonel
- Commands: United States Marine Band

John R. Bourgeois (born August 31, 1934) is a former conductor of the United States Marine Band from 1979 to 1996, as well as composer and arranger of American music. Bourgeois also currently serves as vice president of the board of trustees of the Sinfonia Educational Foundation. He was initiated as an honorary member of the Zeta Pi chapter of Phi Mu Alpha Sinfonia music fraternity at Loyola University in 1956, and as a member of the fraternity's Alpha Alpha National Honorary Chapter in 1997. He was the fraternity's 2000 recipient of the Charles E. Lutton Man of Music Award, presented at its national convention in Dallas, Texas.

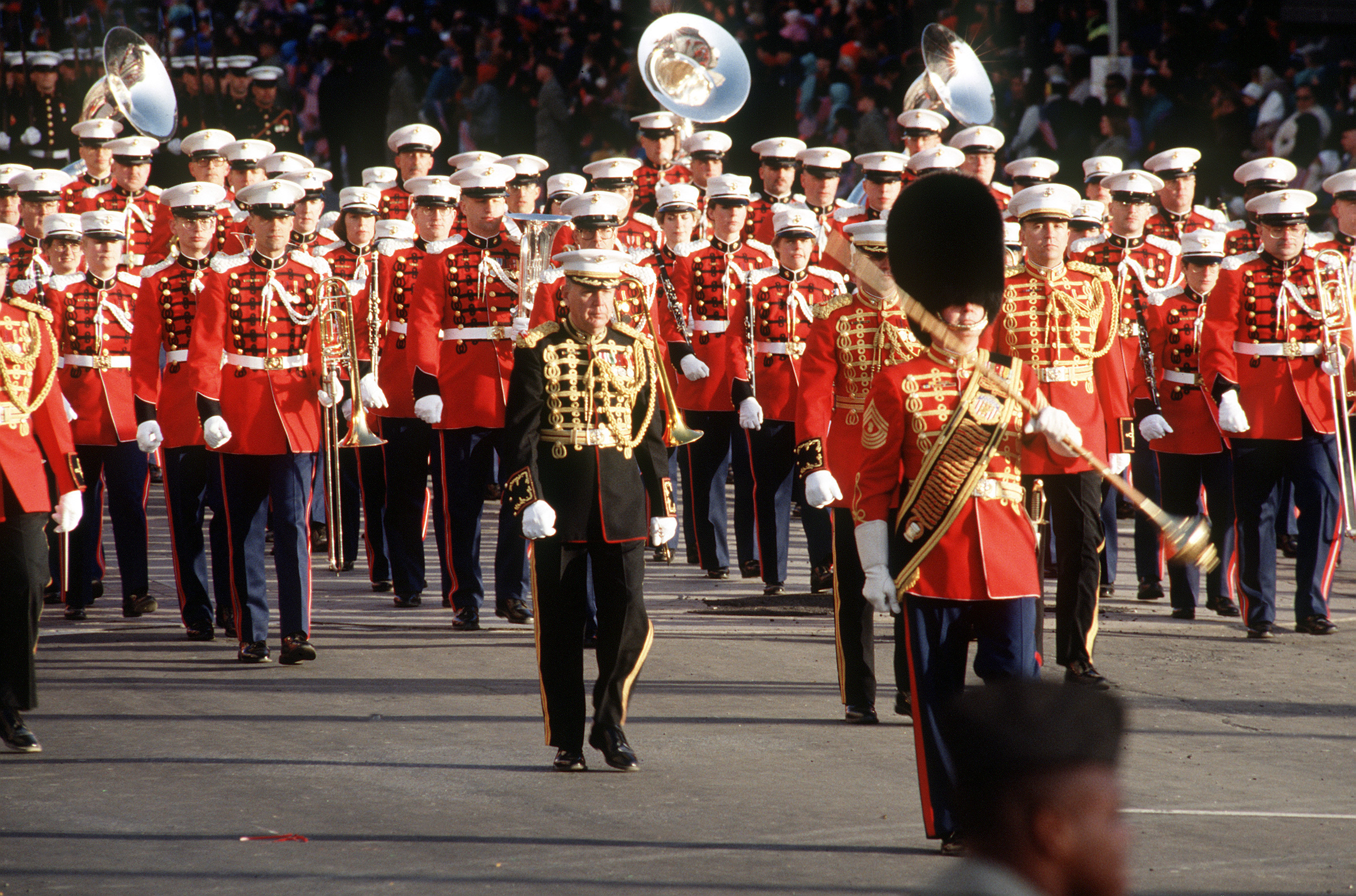
Col. John R. Bourgeois in the 1993 inaugural parade

Colonel Bourgeois, who was born in Gibson, Louisiana, in 1934 and educated at Jesuit High School and Loyola University in New Orleans, served in the Marine Band under every president from Dwight Eisenhower to Bill Clinton.

Colonel Bourgeois has two sons, John A. Bourgeois, an attorney in Baltimore, Maryland, and Alexander S. (“Alec”) Bourgeois, a musician, artist, and web creative consultant in Washington, D.C., five grandchildren, and three great-grandchildren.

== Music ==
Sunflower Slow Drag
Scott Joplin's "Sunflower Slow Drag" performed by the United States Marine Band in 1994 with Bourgeois conducting.

Comrades of the Legion
John Philip Sousa's march "Comrades of the Legion" (1920), from "The President's Own" United States Marine Band's album Semper Fidelis: Music of John Philip Sousa; Colonel John R. Bourgeois, director

Galop, transcribed by Bourgeois
From the operetta Geneviève de Brabant (the basis of the "Marines' Hymn")
