= School of Jazz =

School of Jazz may refer to:

- Lenox School of Jazz, summer programme of jazz education from 1957 to 1960, at the Music Barn in Lenox, Massachusetts, USA
- Rimon School of Jazz and Contemporary Music, Israel
- School of Jazz (The New School), part of the College of Performing Arts at The New School, New York, NY, USA
