= Home (Ken McIntyre album) =

Studio album by Ken McIntyre
- Released: 1975
- Recorded: June 23, 1975
- Studio: Minot Sound Studios, White Plains, New York
- Genre: Jazz
- Length: 39:36
- Label: SteepleChase; SCS 1039
- Producer: Nils Winther

Ken McIntyre chronology
Hindsight (1974)	Home (1975)	Open Horizon (1975)

Home is an album written and recorded by American jazz musician Ken McIntyre in 1975 under the SteepleChase label. It features Jaki Byard, Reggie Workman, and Andrei Strobert.

== Reception ==
Professional ratings
Review scores
Source	Rating
AllMusic	4.5/5 stars
Christgau's Record Guide	A−
The Penguin Guide to Jazz Recordings	3/4 stars

Allmusic awarded the album 4½ stars calling it an "excellent outing" and stating "The post-bop music is consistently inventive and easily recommended".

== Track listing ==
All compositions by Ken McIntyre

1. "Undulation" - 3:45
2. "Cousin Elma" - 3:28
3. "Charlotte" - 6:42
4. "Amy" - 2:58
5. "Sea Train" - 3:35
6. "Home" - 2:40
7. "Kheil" - 3:00
8. "Jamaican Sunset" - 3:57
9. "Corner Time" - 6:20
10. "Peas 'N' Rice" - 3:11

== Personnel ==
- Ken McIntyre - alto saxophone, flute, bassoon, bass clarinet
- Jaki Byard - piano, electric piano
- Reggie Workman - bass
- Andrei Strobert - drums
