= In the Wind: The Woodwind Quartets =

Studio album by Makanda Ken McIntyre
- Released: 2004
- Recorded: October 1995 and April 1996
- Studios: Marion Studios, Fairview, New Jersey
- Genre: Jazz
- Length: 1:14:59
- Labels: Passin' Thru Records; 41220
- Producer: Makanda Ken McIntyre

Makanda Ken McIntyre chronology
A New Beginning (2001)	In the Wind: The Woodwind Quartets (2004)

In the Wind: The Woodwind Quartets is an album by multi-instrumentalist Makanda Ken McIntyre. It was recorded during October 1995 and April 1996 at Marion Studios in Fairview, New Jersey, and was released in 2004 by Passin' Thru Records, three years after his death. On the album, which features eleven original compositions, McIntyre performs all instrumental parts via overdubbing, and is heard on flutes, saxophones, clarinets, and double-reed instruments.

== Reception ==
Professional ratings
Review scores
Source	Rating
All About Jazz	4/5 stars
AllMusic	4/5 stars
The Penguin Guide to Jazz Recordings	4/4 stars

In a review for AllMusic, Scott Yanow wrote: "These quartets were an experiment of sorts, but a largely successful one... The intriguing tone colors and Makanda Ken McIntyre's consistent creativity make this a project well worth exploring."

The authors of The Penguin Guide to Jazz Recordings awarded the album a full four stars, calling it "a quite astonishing curtain-call," and stating: "The title is oddly moving, for however much artifice there necessarily is in overdubbing multiple parts, these 11 performances have an entirely natural and poignantly evanescent quality... a record to savour over time, and a fitting memorial to a genuine original who diverted his talent to helping others."

Jerry D'Souza of All About Jazz commented: "McIntyre assimilates the instruments beautifully. His arrangements make use of space to weave tight textures or use a tight line to add counterpoint and extend the body. More, he holds the music together with a sure sense of structure and development." AAJ's Kurt Gottschalk called the album "a gorgeous tribute while providing a fascinating insight into the composer and performer," and remarked: "For studio constructions, the pieces are surprisingly warm. At the same time, it carries the uncanny feeling of multi-tracked works by other masters... that give several voices to a single mind." AAJ writer Rex Butters described the album as "eminently listenable," and noted that it "displays the considerable breadth of [McIntyre's] musical pallette, nimbly balancing calypso, bop, and nudges outside, with solid blues sense."

== Track listing ==
Composed by Makanda Ken McIntyre.

1. "Peas 'n' Rice" – 7:05
2. "Home" – 6:40
3. "Charshee" – 7:23
4. "Black Sugar Cane" – 6:37
5. "Chitlins and Cavyah" – 8:08
6. "Mambooga" – 4:40
7. "Blanche" – 9:58
8. "Puunti" – 6:26
9. "Chasing the Sun" – 6:18
10. "Eileen" – 5:41
11. "Amy" – 5:34

== Personnel ==
- Makanda Ken McIntyre – flute, alto flute, bass flute, B♭ clarinet, alto clarinet, bass clarinet, oboe, English horn, bassoon, soprano saxophone, alto saxophone, tenor saxophone, baritone saxophone
