= A New Beginning (Makanda Ken McIntyre album) =

Studio album by Makanda Ken McIntyre
- Released: 2001
- Recorded: September 18, 1999
- Studios: EastSide Sound Studio, New York City
- Genre: Jazz
- Length: 1:07:07
- Labels: Passin' Thru Records; 41215

Makanda Ken McIntyre chronology
Tribute (1991)	A New Beginning (2001)	In the Wind: The Woodwind Quartets (2004)

A New Beginning is an album by multi-instrumentalist Makanda Ken McIntyre. His final session, it was recorded on September 18, 1999, at EastSide Sound Studio in New York City, and was issued in 2001 by Passin' Thru Records, shortly before his death. On the album, which features twelve original compositions, McIntyre is joined by pianist Joanne Brackeen, double bassist Wilber Morris, and drummer Charli Persip.

== Reception ==
Professional ratings
Review scores
Source	Rating
AllMusic	4.5/5 stars
The Penguin Guide to Jazz Recordings	3/4 stars

In a review for AllMusic, arwulf arwulf wrote: "In keeping with the textural versatility of this artist's recorded output, there are reflective moods, friendly romps, and beatific studies... searching lyrical improvisations... and rhythmic dances suffused with Caribbean rhythms... Brackeen, Morris and Persip interact wonderfully with the composer and multi-instrumentalist on what turned out to be his final gift to the world."

The authors of The Penguin Guide to Jazz Recordings stated that the album features "a dozen vivid originals that helped to restore Ken's reputation just as he left us," and commented: "Having devoted most of his energy to other pursuits... [McIntyre] called up a fine quartet and released a forthright disc that suggested he was far from finished with jazz music."

Writing for JazzTimes, John Litweiler described the music as "in the doorway between inside and outside jazz," featuring solos that can be characterized as "flights of fancy, quite in contrast to McIntyre's aggressive hard-bop rhythm section," all of whom "swing hard."

A reviewer for All About Jazz called the album "a logical step forward for an artist who never received the recognition... that he deserved," and noted: "The twelve tunes on this record offer him opportunities to stretch out at length on the alto saxophone and flute, plus other reed instruments. With a variety of moods and feels, they emphasize melody and coherence... By the time this group wraps up the title track closer... you'll wish there was more."

== Track listing ==
Composed by Makanda Ken McIntyre.

1. "Black Sugar Cane" – 7:36
2. "Evolvement" – 4:38
3. "Breadfruit" – 6:34
4. "Witch's Brew" – 7:07
5. "Another Look" – 5:27
6. "Monk and Trane" – 4:41
7. "Toy Rugs" – 5:02
8. "Joyous Remembrance" – 5:08
9. "Smile" – 5:30
10. "Sonny" – 4:32
11. "Tomorrow? Tonight!" – 4:44
12. "A New Beginning" – 6:08

== Personnel ==
- Makanda Ken McIntyre – alto saxophone, bass clarinet, oboe, flute, bassoon
- Joanne Brackeen – piano
- Wilber Morris – double bass
- Charli Persip – drums
