= Hindsight (Ken McIntyre album) =

Studio album by Ken McIntyre
- Released: 1974
- Recorded: January 13, 1974
- Studio: Rosenberg Studio, Copenhagen, Denmark
- Genre: Jazz
- Length: 58:18
- Label: SteepleChase; SCS 1014
- Producer: Nils Winther

Ken McIntyre chronology
Way, Way Out (1963)	Hindsight (1974)	Home (1975)

Hindsight is an album recorded by American saxophonist Ken McIntyre in 1974 for the SteepleChase label.

== Reception ==
Professional ratings
Review scores
Source	Rating
Allmusic	4.5/5 stars

Allmusic awarded the album 4½ stars calling it a "well-rounded program" and stating "McIntyre is in consistently brilliant form".

== Track listing ==
All compositions by Ken McIntyre except as indicated

1. "Bootsie" - 7:10
2. "Lush Life" (Billy Strayhorn) - 3:21
3. "Mercedes" - 5:53
4. "Body and Soul" (Frank Eyton, Johnny Green, Edward Heyman, Robert Sour) - 9:10
5. "Airebil" - 8:05
6. "Naima" (John Coltrane) - 4:55
7. "'Round About Midnight" (Bernie Hanighen, Thelonious Monk, Cootie Williams) - 7:50
8. "Sunnymoon for Two" (Sonny Rollins) - 4:46
9. "Body and Soul" [Alternate Take] (Eyton, Green, Heyman, Sour) - 7:26 Bonus track on CD reissue

== Personnel ==
- Ken McIntyre - alto saxophone (1, 5, 7 & 8), flute (3), bassoon (2), bass clarinet (4 & 9), oboe (6)
- Kenny Drew - piano
- Bo Stief - bass
- Alex Riel - drums
