= Open Horizon =

Studio album by Ken McIntyre
- Released: 1976
- Recorded: November 19, 1975
- Studio: C.I. Recording Studio, New York City
- Genre: Jazz
- Length: 46:46
- Label: SteepleChase; SCS 1049
- Producer: Nils Winther

Ken McIntyre chronology
Home (1975)	Open Horizon (1976)	Introducing the Vibrations (1977)

Open Horizon is an album recorded by American saxophonist Ken McIntyre in 1975 for the SteepleChase label.

== Reception ==
Professional ratings
Review scores
Source	Rating
Allmusic	4/5 stars
The Penguin Guide to Jazz Recordings	3/4 stars

Allmusic awarded the album 4 stars.

== Track listing ==
All compositions by Ken McIntyre

1. "Sister Precious" - 3:53
2. "Don't I" - 10:59
3. "Daybreak" - 4:12
4. "Puunti" - 3:36
5. "Open Horizon" - 4:18
6. "Jawne" - 6:07
7. "Sendai" - 5:33
8. "Bee Pod" - 8:08

== Personnel ==
- Ken McIntyre - alto saxophone, flute, bassoon, oboe
- Kenny Drew - piano, electric piano
- Buster Williams - bass
- Andrei Strobert - drums
