= Stone Blues =

Studio album by Ken McIntyre
- Released: 1962
- Recorded: May 31, 1960
- Studio: Van Gelder Studio, Englewood Cliffs, New Jersey
- Genre: Jazz
- Length: 44:27
- Label: New Jazz; NJLP 8259
- Producer: Esmond Edwards

Ken McIntyre chronology
Stone Blues (1962)	Looking Ahead (1960)

Stone Blues is an album by American saxophonist Ken McIntyre. It was the first record that McIntyre recorded, done in 1960 for the New Jazz label, although it was released in 1962, subsequent to the release of Looking Ahead.

== Reception ==
Professional ratings
Review scores
Source	Rating
Allmusic	4.5/5 stars
Down Beat	4.5/5 stars
The Penguin Guide to Jazz Recordings	2.5/4 stars

Allmusic awarded the album 4½ stars stating "This early effort by Ken McIntyre (who doubles here on alto and flute) grows in interest with each listen... essentially advanced bop slightly influenced by the "new thing" music of Ornette Coleman".

== Track listing ==
All compositions by Ken McIntyre except as indicated

1. "Stone Blues" - 11:44
2. "Cornballs" - 4:21
3. "Blanche" - 6:00
4. "Mellifluous" - 7:14
5. "Smax" - 5:07
6. "Charshee" - 4:39
7. "I'll Close My Eyes" (Buddy Kaye, Billy Reid) - 5:22

== Personnel ==
- Ken McIntyre - alto saxophone, flute
- John Mancebo Lewis - trombone
- Dizzy Sal - piano
- Paul Morrison - bass
- Bobby Ward - drums
