= Lenox School of Jazz =

The Lenox School of Jazz was a summer programme of jazz education from 1957 to 1960, at the Music Barn in Lenox, Massachusetts.

Faculty included Dizzy Gillespie, Jimmy Giuffre, John Lewis, Percy Heath, Larry Ridley, Connie Kay, Jim Hall, Ralph Peña, Max Roach, Willis James, and Kenny Dorham.

Students included Ornette Coleman, Margo Guryan, Dizzy Sal, Jamey Aebersold, David Baker, Paul Bley, Attila Zoller, Lucille Butterman, Terry Hawkeye, Verne Elkins, Cevira Rose, Dale Hillary, and Esther Siegel.

== Scholarships ==
A number of scholarships were available.

In late 1957 Herman Lubinsky, head of Savoy Records in Newark, NJ, established a scholarship for full tuition, room and board, and private lesson fees to a promising instrumental student for attendance at the School of Jazz during its second annual session on the grounds of Music Inn, Lenox, Massachusetts, during August, 1958.

In 1959 the F. & M. Schaefer Brewing Company awarded the Shafer Scholarships to John Keyser, Paul Cohen, Steve Kuhn, Dave Mackay, Ian Underwood, Tony Greenwald and Herb Gardner. R.J. Schaefer III presented the scholarships.

== Discography ==
- The Lenox Jazz School Concert - August 29, 1959 with Ornette Coleman, Don Cherry, Kenny Dorham, Jimmy Giuffre, Ian Underwood, Gunther Schuller, Gary McFarland, Attila Zoller, Steve Kuhn, Ran Blake, Larry Ridley (Fresh Sound)

== Bibliography ==
- Jeremy Yudkin: The Lenox School of Jazz - A Vital Chapter in the History of American Music and Race Relations. ISBN 0-9789089-1-0.

Dizzy Gillespie with Al Fraser: “To Be or Not To Bop”- ‘School for Jazz.’ {ISBN 978-0-8166-6547-1}
