= Petar Spassov =

American drummer

- Birth name: Petar Spasov
- Born: December 4, 1931; Zagreb, Kingdom of Yugoslavia
- Died: October 4, 2004 (aged 72); Boston, Massachusetts
- Genres: Jazz, swing, dixieland
- Occupation: Musician
- Instrument: Drums
- Years active: 1950s–1970s

Petar Spassov born Petar Spasov (December 4, 1931 – October 6, 2004) was a Yugoslav and American jazz drummer. He helped pioneer jazz in the Socialist Federal Republic of Yugoslavia.

== Biography ==
His music career began in early 1950s, playing drums in small jazz bands in Zagreb such as the Milan Lulić quartet, Mihajlo Schwarz Trio, and Boris Frančišković Quartet. In 1959 he was declared the best jazz drummer in Yugoslavia. Based on that he received a scholarship from DownBeat magazine to study at Berklee College of Music in Boston with Max Roach.

After the course he decided to stay in America and started playing with Clark Terry, Gerry Mulligan, Dave Brubeck, and Benny Golson. He recorded with Indian jazz pianist Dizzy Sal - Jazz in the Classroom Volume V, issued in 1961.

== Discography ==
- Jazz U Hrvatskoj na nosačima zvuka 1938–1960 (Croatia Records, 1995)
- Jazz in the Classroom - A Tribute to Benny Golson (Berklee Records)
