= Looking Ahead (Makanda Ken McIntyre album) =

Studio album by Ken McIntyre with Eric Dolphy
- Released: January 1961
- Recorded: June 28, 1960
- Studio: Van Gelder Studio, Englewood Cliffs, New Jersey
- Genre: Jazz
- Length: 44:27
- Label: New Jazz; NJLP 8247
- Producer: Esmond Edwards

Ken McIntyre chronology
Stone Blues (1960)	Looking Ahead (1961)	Year of the Iron Sheep (1962)

Looking Ahead is the debut album by American jazz musician Ken McIntyre, recorded with fellow alto saxophonist Eric Dolphy in 1960 and released on the New Jazz label in January 1961.

== Reception ==
Professional ratings
Review scores
Source	Rating
Down Beat	2.5/5 stars
Allmusic	4.5/5 stars
The Penguin Guide to Jazz Recordings	3.5/4 stars

Allmusic awarded the album 4½ stars stating "It was quite fitting that Ken McIntyre had an opportunity to record in a quintet with Eric Dolphy, for his multi-instrumental approach was similar to Dolphy's, although he always had a very different sound... A very interesting date".

== Track listing ==
All compositions by Ken McIntyre except as indicated

1. "Lautir" - 4:03
2. "Curtsy" - 5:51
3. "Geo's Tune" - 7:15
4. "They All Laughed" (George Gershwin, Ira Gershwin) - 5:06
5. "Head Shakin'" - 10:45
6. "Dianna" - 9:05

== Personnel ==
- Ken McIntyre - alto saxophone, flute
- Eric Dolphy - alto saxophone, bass clarinet, flute
- Walter Bishop Jr. - piano
- Sam Jones - bass
- Art Taylor - drums
