= Introducing the Vibrations =

Studio album by Ken McIntyre Sextet
- Released: 1977
- Recorded: October 30, 1976
- Studio: C.I. Recording Studio, New York City
- Genre: Jazz
- Length: 39:51
- Label: SteepleChase; SCS 1065
- Producer: Nils Winther

Ken McIntyre chronology
Open Horizon (1976)	Introducing the Vibrations (1977)	Chasing the Sun (1978)

Introducing the Vibrations is an album recorded by American saxophonist Ken McIntyre in 1976 for the SteepleChase label.

== Reception ==
Professional ratings
Review scores
Source	Rating
Allmusic	3/5 stars
The Penguin Guide to Jazz Recordings	3/4 stars

Allmusic awarded the album 3 stars stating "The leader is heard on one song apiece playing flute, bass clarinet, oboe and bassoon, and he uses the alto on two others. Surprisingly enough, all of the songs were written during the 1956-62 period (all but one are from the 1956-59), although most sound fairly adventurous on this interesting if not essential outing".

== Track listing ==
All compositions by Ken McIntyre

1. "Theme" - 8:27
2. "Eileen" - 5:40
3. "Shortie" - 5:34
4. "Clear Eyes" - 8:20
5. "Now Is the Time" - 5:42
6. "Miss Priss" - 6:17

== Personnel ==
- Ken McIntyre - alto saxophone, flute, bassoon, oboe, bass clarinet, percussion
- Terumasa Hino - trumpet, flugelhorn, tambourine
- Richard Harper - piano
- Alonzo Gardner - bass
- Andrei Strobert - drums
- Andy Vega - congas, percussion
