= Year of the Iron Sheep =

Studio album by Ken McIntyre
- Recorded: June 11, August 31, September 4, 1962
- Studio: Sound Mixers, New York City, U.S.
- Genre: Jazz
- Label: United Artists
- Producer: Alan Douglas

Ken McIntyre chronology
Looking Ahead (1960)	Year of the Iron Sheep (1962)	Way, Way Out (1963)

Year of the Iron Sheep is an album by American jazz musician Ken McIntyre.

== Background ==
Year of the Iron Sheep was Ken McIntyre's third album, and his first for United Artists Records. It was named after his birth year in the Tibetan calendar.

== Recording and music ==
The album was produced by Alan Douglas and recorded at Sound Mixers, New York City. All of the tracks except "Laura" were composed by McIntyre. The final track, "Someday", was taken from a June 11, 1962 session involving trombonist John Mancebo Lewis, but although he is mentioned on the sleeve this was in fact the only track from that session on which he did not play. A second session, on August 31, yielded "Cosmos", played by McIntyre with Jaki Byard (piano), Ron Carter (bass), and Louis Hayes (drums). For the final session, four days later, Hayes was replaced by Ben Riley, and the remaining four tracks on the album were recorded.

== Releases ==
Year of the Iron Sheep was released on LP by United Artists. It was later combined with another album and additional tracks on the 2-CD set The Complete United Artists Sessions.

== Reception ==
Billboard selected the album as a "special merit pick", commenting that "McIntyre's work on alto and flute is exciting and lyrical, and worth hearing as a new direction in scored jazz."

== Track listing ==
All compositions by Ken McIntyre except where noted.

1. "Say What" – 5:00
2. "Arisin'" – 10:10
3. "Laura" (David Raksin, Johnny Mercer) – 3:25
4. "96.5" – 4:10
5. "Cosmos" – 5:15
6. "Someday" – 8:47

== Personnel ==
Tracks 1–4

- Ken McIntyre – alto sax, flute
- Jaki Byard – piano
- Ron Carter – bass
- Ben Riley – drums

Track 5

- Ken McIntyre – alto sax
- Jaki Byard – piano
- Ron Carter – bass
- Louis Hayes – drums

Track 6

- Ken McIntyre – flute
- Ed Stoute – piano
- Ahmed Abdul-Malik – bass
- Warren Smith – drums

(Trombonist John M. Lewis was erroneously credited on the sleeve)
