= Chasing the Sun (Ken McIntyre album) =

Studio album by Ken McIntyre Trio
- Released: 1979
- Recorded: July 7, 1978
- Studio: C.I. Recording Studio, New York City
- Genre: Jazz
- Length: 38:25
- Label: SteepleChase; SCS 1114
- Producer: Nils Winther

Ken McIntyre chronology
Introducing the Vibrations (1977)	Chasing the Sun (1979)	Tribute (1991)

Chasing the Sun is an album written and recorded by American jazz musician Ken McIntyre in 1978 under the SteepleChase label. It features Hakim Jami on bass and Beaver Harris on drums.

== Reception ==
Professional ratings
Review scores
Source	Rating
Allmusic	4/5 stars
The Penguin Guide to Jazz Recordings	3.5/4 stars

Allmusic awarded the album 4 stars.

== Track listing ==
All compositions by Ken McIntyre

1. "I Close My Eyes" - 6:25
2. "Coconut Bread" - 7:00
3. "El Hajj Malik" - 5:30
4. "Puddin'" - 6:00
5. "Got My Mind Set on Freedom" - 5:10
6. "High Noon" - 4:23
7. "Chasing the Sun" - 3:45

== Personnel ==
- Ken McIntyre - alto saxophone, flute, bassoon, oboe, bass clarinet
- Hakim Jami - bass
- Beaver Harris - drums
