= Sinfonia Educational Foundation =

The Sinfonia Educational Foundation (SEF) is the philanthropic arm of the Phi Mu Alpha Sinfonia Music Fraternity.

== SEF scholarships, grants, and programs ==
=== Scholarships ===
Sources:

- Sinfonia Educational Foundation ($5,000, $2,500)
- James H. Patrenos Memorial Scholarship ($1,000)
- W. Eldridge and Emily Lowe Scholarship ($1,000)
- Delta Iota Alumni Scholarship ($500)

=== Grants ===
- Travel Reimbursement Grants
- Chapter/Province Matching Grants
- Overseas Travel Grants
- Research Assistance Grants

=== Programs ===
- Leadership Institute
- Sinfonia Winds

== History ==
SEF began in 1954 as the Sinfonia Foundation. Over its first 50 years, the SEF changed its direction several times. In many cases, the SEF's mission was much more oriented to promoting music in America, American artists, and American music professionals. In the 21st century, the SEF's mission has become much more oriented towards developing the leadership skills of collegiate members of Phi Mu Alpha Sinfonia Fraternity. In 2003, SEF became the Sinfonia Educational Foundation.

In 2006, the Board of Trustees hired Matthew Garber, the SEF's first Director of Development, to increase the SEF endowment and expand its programs. Garber left SEF in January 2009. At that time the Foundation announced it wouldn't seek a replacement.
