= Charles E. Lutton Man of Music Award =

American music award

The Charles E. Lutton Man of Music Award is one of the highest honors awarded to members of the Phi Mu Alpha Sinfonia fraternity for a lifelong achievement in uplifting the world through art and music. Its recipients include musical legends such as Aaron Copland, W. Francis McBeth, James Levine, Frederick Fennell, Maynard Ferguson, and Col. John R. Bourgeois, USMC (Ret.).

== Name ==
The award is named for Charles E. Lutton, a member of Phi Mu Alpha Sinfonia.

== History ==
The first award was given in 1952 in honor of Lutton.

| Year | Recipient | Chapter |
|---|---|---|
| 1952 | Thor Johnson | Alpha Rho, Alpha Alpha |
| 1954 | Howard Hanson | Iota, Alpha Alpha |
| 1956 | Earl V. Moore | Epsilon, Alpha Alpha |
| 1958 | Sigmund Spaeth | Iota |
| 1960 | Joseph E. Maddy | Epsilon |
| 1962 | Van Cliburn | Alpha Chi, Alpha Alpha |
| 1964 | Archie N. Jones | Alpha Mu, Alpha Alpha |
| 1967 | Price Doyle | Gamma Delta |
| 1970 | Aaron Copland | Alpha Upsilon |
| 1973 | Pablo Casals | Epsilon Iota |
| 1976 | William Warfield | Delta Lambda |
| 1979 | James Levine | Alpha Omega, Alpha Alpha |
| 1982 | Sherrill Milnes | Alpha Beta |
| 1985 | Clark Terry | Beta Zeta |
| 1988 | W. Francis McBeth | Alpha Iota |
| 1991 | Dave Grusin | Beta Chi |
| 1994 | William D. Revelli | Alpha Lambda |
| 1997 | Leonard Slatkin | Alpha Alpha |
| 2000 | Col. John R. Bourgeois, USMC (Ret.) | Zeta Pi, Alpha Alpha |
| 2003 | Frederick Fennell | Alpha Nu |
| 2006 | Maynard Ferguson | Xi Chi |
| 2009 | Jamey Aebersold | Gamma Omega |
| 2012 | Carlisle Floyd | Epsilon Iota, Alpha Alpha |
| 2015 | Ellis Marsalis, Jr. | Epsilon Lambda, Alpha Alpha |
| 2018 | Daniel E. Gawthrop | Xi Mu, Alpha Alpha |
