= Makanda Ken McIntyre =

American jazz musician, composer and educator

- Born: Kenneth Arthur McIntyre; September 7, 1931; Boston, Massachusetts
- Died: June 13, 2001 (aged 69) New York City
- Genres: Jazz, avant-garde jazz
- Occupations: Musician, teacher
- Instruments: Saxophone, multi-instrumentalist
- Years active: 1960–2000
- Labels: United Artists, SteepleChase

Makanda Ken McIntyre (born Kenneth Arthur McIntyre; also known as Ken McIntyre) (September 7, 1931 – June 13, 2001) was an American jazz musician, composer and educator. In addition to his primary instrument, the alto saxophone, he played flute, bass clarinet, oboe, bassoon, double bass, drums, and piano.

== Biography ==
McIntyre was born in Boston, Massachusetts, United States. His father played mandolin. McIntyre started his musical life on the bugle when he was eight years old, followed by piano. In his teens he discovered the music of Charlie Parker and began playing saxophone at nineteen, then clarinet and flute two years later. In 1953 he served in the Army and played saxophone and piano in Japan.

After serving two years in the U.S. Army, he attended the Boston Conservatory where he studied with Gigi Gryce, Charlie Mariano, and Andy McGhee. In 1958 he received a degree in flute and composition with a master's degree the next year in composition. He also received a doctorate (Ed.D.) in curriculum design from the University of Massachusetts Amherst in 1975.

In 1960 he recorded as a leader with Eric Dolphy. Beginning the next year, and for the next six years, he taught music in public schools. He took oboe lessons in New York before playing with Bill Dixon, Jaki Byard, and the Jazz Composer's Orchestra. Then he spent three years with pianist Cecil Taylor. During the 1970s he recorded with Nat Adderley and Beaver Harris and in the 1980s with Craig Harris and Charlie Haden.

In 1971, he founded the first African American Music program in America at the State University of New York College at Old Westbury, teaching for 24 years. He also taught at Wesleyan University, Smith College, Central State University, Fordham University, and The New School for Jazz and Contemporary Music.

In the early 1990s, he changed his name to Makanda Ken McIntyre. While performing in Zimbabwe, a stranger handed him a piece of paper with the word "Makanda" written on it; the word means "many skins" in the Ndebele language and "many heads" in Shona.

McIntyre died of a heart attack in New York City, at the age of 69 on June 13, 2001.

== Discography ==
=== As leader ===
- Stone Blues (New Jazz, 1961)
- Looking Ahead (New Jazz, 1961)
- Year of the Iron Sheep (United Artists, 1962)
- Way, Way Out (United Artists, 1963)
- Hindsight (SteepleChase, 1974)
- Home (SteepleChase, 1975)
- Open Horizon (SteepleChase, 1975)
- Introducing the Vibrations (SteepleChase, 1977)
- Chasing the Sun (SteepleChase, 1979)
- Tribute (Serene, 1991)
- A New Beginning (Passin' Thru, 2001)
- In the Wind: The Woodwind Quartets (Passin' Thru, 2004) recorded in 1995 and 1996

=== As sideman ===
With Charlie Haden

- Dream Keeper (DIW, 1990)
- The Montreal Tapes: Liberation Music Orchestra (Verve, 1999)
- Live in Montreal (Image Entertainment, 2002)

With Beaver Harris

- Beautiful Africa (Soul Note, 1979)
- Negcaumongus (Cadence, 1981)
- Live at Nyon (Cadence, 1981)
- Safe (Red, 1980)

With Archie Shepp, Bill Dixon

- Quartet (FreeFactory, 2009 )
- Bill Dixon 7-tette/Archie Shepp and the New York Contemporary 5 (Savoy, 1964)

With others

- Nat Adderley, Don't Look Back (SteepleChase, 1976)
- Eric Dolphy, Fire Waltz (Prestige, 1978)
- Honi Gordon, Honi Gordon Sings (Prestige, 1962)
- Craig Harris, Aboriginal Affairs (India Navigation, 1983)
- Jazz Composer's Orchestra, Communication (Fontana, 1966)
- Michael Mantler/Carla Bley, 13 & 3/4 (1975)
- Cecil Taylor, Unit Structures (Blue Note, 1966)
