= Jamey Aebersold =

American publisher, music educator, and saxophonist

- Born: Wilton Jameson Aebersold; July 21, 1939 (age 87); New Albany, Indiana, U.S.
- Genre: Jazz
- Occupations: Educator, publisher, record producer, musician
- Instrument: Saxophone
- Years active: 1967–present
- Website: www.jazzbooks.com

Wilton Jameson "Jamey" Aebersold (born July 21, 1939) is an American publisher, educator, and jazz saxophonist. His Play-A-Long series of instructional books and CDs, using the chord-scale system, the first of which was released in 1967, are an internationally renowned resource for jazz education. His summer workshops have educated students of all ages since the 1960s.

== Career ==
Aebersold was born in New Albany, Indiana. When he was fifteen, he played with local bands, then attended Indiana University in Bloomington while leading bands in southern Indiana and Kentucky. During the late 1960s, he taught at Indiana University Southeast and in the 1970s and 1990s at the University of Louisville. He began weeklong summer workshops for students which have spread throughout the world into countries such as Canada, England, Scotland, Germany, Denmark, New Zealand, and Australia. Aebersold plays saxophone, piano, banjo, and double bass.

== Play-A-Long series ==
Most of the volumes in Aebersold's Play-A-Long series feature a selection of ten to twelve jazz standards, though some focus on scales, standardized chord progressions (like the blues), or original compositions by Aebersold's collaborators. The books contain charts for the tunes in question, transposed as necessary for instruments in C (treble and bass clef), as well as transpositions for B♭ and E♭ instruments. The recordings feature a professional rhythm section (typically piano, bass, and drums, occasionally including guitar) performing an improvised accompaniment (comping) to each song. Melody instruments like saxophone and trumpet are omitted, enabling a jazz student to practice the song's melody and improvise over the chord changes with accompaniment. Piano and bass tracks are panned to opposite channels so that a pianist or bassist can easily omit the recorded piano or bass part by muting the appropriate channel.

Perhaps the most well-known feature of the "Play-A-Long" series is Aebersold's voice, which counts off the tempo for each track on most Aebersold recordings.

Thibeault (2022) documents the development of Aebersold's materials, from his first volume in 1967 and continued development over 50 years, more than 130 volumes, and with sales of over 5 million copies, concluding that Aebersold's materials helped to develop the first widespread shared idea of what a beginning jazz improvisor should be. Borgerson and Schroeder (2024) discuss Aebersold and reproduce one of the Play-A-Long records, You Can Play ... Sonny Rollins (1976).

== Workshops ==
For over 50 years, Aebersold has also run summer jazz workshops, historically throughout the US and internationally, and in recent years at the University of Louisville. The week-long event is billed as a place to learn jazz through hands-on experience through an intensive learning environment for musicians of varying ages and levels. The standard curriculum includes master classes, ear-training sessions, jazz theory classes from beginning to advanced, and concerts by faculty.

Aebersold regularly performs and presents clinics at the jazz festival at Murray State University in Murray, Kentucky. The festival was renamed the Jamey Aebersold Jazz Festival in 2015 to honor his many years of service to the jazz program at that institution.

== Awards and honors ==
- 1992 Honorary doctorate, Indiana University Jacobs School of Music.
- 2004 Midwest Clinic "Medal of Honor" in Jazz Education.
- 2007 Indiana Governor's Arts Award by Mitch Daniels.
- 2009 Honorary membership in Alpha Alpha national chapter of Phi Mu Alpha Sinfonia.
- 2009 Charles E. Lutton Man of Music Award.
- 2014 NEA Jazz Masters
