= Niels-Henning Ørsted Pedersen discography =

Discography of Niels-Henning Ørsted Pedersen

Niels-Henning Ørsted Pedersen
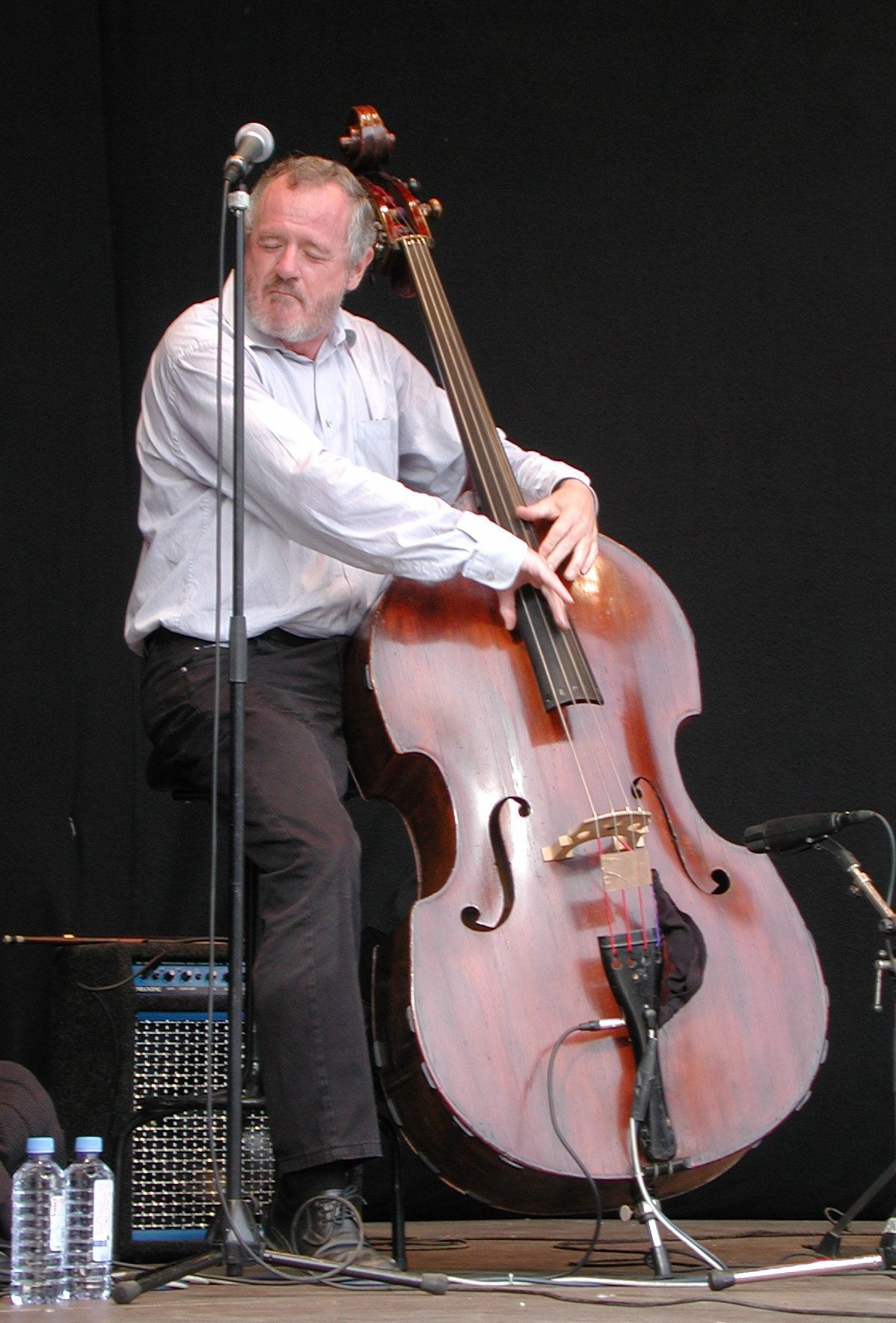

Background information
- Born: 27 May 1946; Osted, Zealand, Denmark
- Died: 19 April 2005 (aged 58) Ishøj, Zealand
- Genres: Jazz, avant-garde jazz
- Occupations: Musician, composer
- Instrument: Double bass
- Years active: 1960s–2005

Niels-Henning Ørsted Pedersen (27 May 1946 – 19 April 2005) was a Danish jazz double bassist.

== Discography ==
=== As leader ===
- Paul Bley/NHØP with Paul Bley (SteepleChase, 1973)
- Duo with Kenny Drew (SteepleChase, 1973)
- Duo 2 with Kenny Drew (SteepleChase, 1974)
- Two's Company with Joe Albany (SteepleChase, 1974)
- Jaywalkin' (SteepleChase, 1975)
- Duo Live in Concert with Kenny Drew (SteepleChase, 1975)
- Movability with Martial Solal (MPS, 1976)
- Double Bass with Sam Jones (SteepleChase, 1976)
- Pictures with Kenneth Knudsen (SteepleChase, 1977)
- In Concert with Kenny Drew (SteepleChase, 1979)
- Dancing on the Tables (SteepleChase, 1979)
- Goin' Straight with Edgar Wilson (MPS, 1979)
- Tania Maria & Niels Henning Orsted Pedersen (Medley, 1979)
- Four Keys (MPS) with Martial Solal, Lee Konitz, John Scofield (MPS, 1979)
- Chops with Joe Pass (Pablo, 1979)
- Just the Way You Are with Rune Gustafsson (Sonet, 1980)
- Northsea Nights with Joe Pass (Pablo, 1980)
- Looking at Bird with Archie Shepp (SteepleChase, 1981)
- The Viking with Philip Catherine (Pablo, 1983)
- Trinity with Boulou Ferre, Elios Ferre (SteepleChase, 1983)
- Face to Face with Tete Montoliu (SteepleChase, 1984)
- With a Little Help from My Friend(s) with Claes Crona (Skivbolaget, 1985)
- With Joy and Feelings with Ulla Neumann (Four Leaf Clover, 1985)
- The Eternal Traveller (Pablo, 1984)
- Threesome with Monty Alexander, Grady Tate (Soul Note, 1986)
- Heart to Heart with Mikkelborg/Knudsen (Storyville, 1986)
- Play with Us with Louis Hjulmand (Olufsen, 1987)
- Duologue with Allan Botschinsky (MA Music, 1987)
- Latin Alley with Alain Jean-Marie (IDA, 1988)
- Copenhagen Groove with Moller/Clausen/Cobb (Stunt, 1989)
- Three for the Road with Guitars Unlimited (Sonet, 1989)
- Homage/Once Upon a Time with Mikkelborg (Sonet, 1990)
- Uncharted Land (Pladecompagniet, 1992)
- Spanish Nights with Philip Catherine (Enja, 1992)
- Art of the Duo with Philip Catherine (Enja, 1993)
- Ambiance with Danish Radio Big Band (Dacapo, 1994)
- Misty Dawn with Doky/Riel (Columbia, 1994)
- Scandinavian Wood (Caprice, 1995)
- Those Who Were (Verve, 1996)
- Elegies Mostly with Dick Hyman (Gemini, 1996)
- Friends Forever featuring Renee Rosnes (Milestone, 1997) – recorded in 1995
- This Is All I Ask (Verve, 1998) – recorded in 1997
- In the Name of Music with Trio Rococo (BMG, 1998)
- The Duets with Mulgrew Miller (Bang & Olufsen, 1999)
- Breaking the Ice with Floris Nico Bunink (BV Haast, 1999)
- Grundtvigs Sang Til Livet with Ole Kock Hansen (Vartov, 2000)
- The Duo Live! with Mulgrew Miller (Storyville, 2016)

=== As sideman ===
With Svend Asmussen

- Telemann Today (Polydor, 1976)
- Prize/Winners (Matrix, 1978)
- Sven Asmussen at Slukafter (Phontastic, 1989)

With Chet Baker

- The Touch of Your Lips (SteepleChase, 1979)
- No Problem (SteepleChase, 1979)
- Daybreak (SteepleChase, 1979)
- This Is Always (SteepleChase, 1982)
- Someday My Prince Will Come (SteepleChase, 1983)

With Dexter Gordon

- One Flight Up (Blue Note, 1964 [1965])
- Cheese Cake (SteepleChase, 1964 [1979])
- I Want More (SteepleChase, 1964 [1980])
- Love for Sale (SteepleChase, 1964 [1982])
- It's You or No One (SteepleChase, 1964 [1983])
- Billie's Bounce (SteepleChase, 1964 [1983])
- Loose Walk (SteepleChase, 1965 [2003])
- Heartaches (SteepleChase, 1965 [2004])
- Misty (SteepleChase, 1965 [2004])
- Ladybird (SteepleChase, 1965 [2005])
- Stella by Starlight (SteepleChase, 1966 [2005])
- Both Sides of Midnight (Black Lion, 1967 [1988])
- Body and Soul (Black Lion, 1967 [1988])
- Take the "A" Train (Black Lion, 1967 [1989])
- Jazz at Highschool (Storyville, 1967 [2002])
- A Day in Copenhagen (MPS, 1969)
- The Apartment (SteepleChase, 1974 [1975])
- More Than You Know (SteepleChase, 1975)
- Stable Mable (SteepleChase, 1975)
- Something Different (SteepleChase, 1975 [1980])
- Bouncin' with Dex (SteepleChase, 1975 [1976])
- Swiss Nights Vol. 1 (SteepleChase, 1975 [1976])
- Swiss Nights Vol. 2 (SteepleChase, 1975 [1978])
- Swiss Nights Vol. 3 (SteepleChase, 1975 [1979])
- Lullaby for a Monster (SteepleChase, 1976 [1981])

With Stephane Grappelli

- Two of a Kind (Metronome, 1965) (Stephane Grappelli and Svend Asmussen)
- Young Django (MPS, 1979)
- Tivoli Gardens Copenhagen Denmark (Pablo, 1980)
- Live 1992 (Birdology, 1992)

With Oscar Peterson

- Great Connection (MPS, 1971 [1974])
- The Good Life (Pablo, 1973)
- The Trio (Pablo, 1974)
- Peterson/Grappelli (with Peterson and Grappelli) (Prestige, 1974)
- Oscar Peterson and the Bassists – Montreux '77 (Pablo, 1977)
- The Paris Concert: Salle Pleyel, 1978 (Pablo, 1979)
- Nigerian Marketplace (Pablo, 1981)
- Night Child (Pablo, 1982)
- Skol (Pablo, 1982)
- Oscar Peterson Meets Roy Hargrove and Ralph Moore (Telarc, 1996)
- A Tribute to Oscar Peterson Live at the Town Hall (Telarc, 1997)
- Jazz in Paris (Verve, 2001)

With others

- Tete Montoliu Trio, Catalonian Fire (SteepleChase, 1974)
- Sahib Shihab, "Sahib Shihab and the Danish Radio Jazz Group" (Oktav, 1965)
- Charly Antolini, On the Beat (Bell, 1993)
- Count Basie, Count Basie Jam Session at the Montreux Jazz Festival 1975 (Pablo, 1975)
- Paquito D'Rivera, Hasta Siempre (Plane Jazz, 1978)
- Niels Lan Doky, Here or There (Storyville, 1986)
- Niels Lan Doky, The Target (Storyville, 1987)
- Kenny Drew, Kenny Drew Live (Keystone, 1998)
- Atilla Engin, Melo Perquana (Olufsen, 1988)
- Ella Fitzgerald, Count Basie, Joe Pass Digital III at Montreux (Pablo, 1980)
- Stan Getz, Live at Montmartre (SteepleChase, 1977)
- Rune Gustafsson, String Along with Basie (Sonet, 1989)
- Roy Haynes, My Shining Hour (Storyville, 1995)
- Maria Joao, Alice (Enja, 1992)
- Duke Jordan, Double Duke (SteepleChase, 1997)
- Karin Krog, Open Space (MPS, 1969)
- Karin Krog with Dexter Gordon, Some Other Spring (Sonet, 1970)
- Bireli Lagrene, Standards (Blue Note, 1992)
- Didier Lockwood, New World (MPS, 1979)
- Dado Moroni, Bluesology (Dire, 1981)
- Brew Moore, Zonky (SteepleChase, 2005)
- Joe Pass, What's New (Jazzette, 1992)
- Michel Petrucciani, Petrucciani NOHP (Dreyfus, 2009)
- Martial Solal, Suite for Trio (MPS, 1978)
- Toots Thielemans & Joe Pass, Live in the Netherlands (Pablo, 1982)
- Magni Wentzel, Come Away with Me (Gemini, 1994)
- Dizzy Gillespie, The Giant (Prestige, 1973)
