= Sweet Substitute =

- Sweet Substitute in 1981

Background information
- Origin: Bristol, England
- Genres: A cappella, jazz fusion, Swing
- Years active: 1975–mid 1980s
- Labels: Transatlantic Records, Decca Records, Black Lion Records
- Past members: Teri Penfold, Angie Masterton, Eiri Thrasher, Sammi Brown (Chris Price), Suzi Knowler

Sweet Substitute is an English all girl trio, specializing in jazz and swing harmony recordings, including a cappella. They originated from Bristol, England.

== Founding ==
The trio were founded in 1975, when English folk musician Andy Leggett (see Pigsty Hill Light Orchestra) met singer Teri Penfold (his future wife) at a party and suggested that she should contact Angie Masterton and Eiri Thrasher to form a singing trio.

Eiri left the group and was replaced by Sammi Brown (real name Chris Price). Their first album, Something Special, became BBC Radio 2's album of the week when released in 1977. Shortly after they appeared on a UK radio show with Geoff Love and his Orchestra. They appeared on BBC TV's long running TV show, The Good Old Days.

They carried on recording swing type material in four more albums, despite Decca wanting them to change direction. Chris Price then decided to leave the trio with Kate McNab taking her place. In 1980, they began performing as guests on BBC radio shows with a new repertoire.

After leaving Decca Records they moved to Black Lion Records and issued an album, Sophisticated Ladies (also issued as Sweet Substitute with different packaging) in 1981. The line-up on this album was Angie Masterton, Teri Leggett and Kate McNab. While touring with Georgie Fame, they were backed by guitarist Kit Morgan who is still backing Kate McNab today.

Teri was later replaced by Suzi Knowler. Angie Masterton died in 1999.

== Partial discography ==
Albums

- Something Special – 1977 – Decca Records - SKL 5276
- Sophisticated Ladies – 1981 – Black Lion Records – BLM 51010

Singles

- "I Give In" – 7” – 1978 – Decca - F 13820
- "Back in the World Again" – 7” – 1979 - Decca - F 13833
- "Take Me to the Mardi Gras" – 7” - 1980 – Logo – GO 393 (UK)
- "Take Me to the Mardi Gras" – 7” – 1980 - AVES - INT 111.554 (Germany)
- "Love For Sale" – 7” – 1983 – Polydor - 815 079-7
