= More Power =

More Power may refer to:

- MORE Electric and Power Corporation ("MORE Power" for short), Philippine electric power company
- More Power! (album), a 1969 album by Dexter Gordon
- "More Power" (song), a 2022 song by Liam Gallagher off the album C'mon You Know
- More Power (TV series), a 2022 History Channel documentary TV show starring Tim Allen
- "More power!", a catchphrase by Tim Allen from the TV sitcom Home Improvement

== See also ==
- Power (disambiguation)
