= Dexter Calling... =

Studio album by Dexter Gordon
- Released: End of January 1962
- Recorded: May 9, 1961
- Studio: Van Gelder Studio, Englewood Cliffs, NJ
- Genre: Jazz
- Length: 37:54
- Label: Blue Note; BST 84083
- Producer: Alfred Lion

Dexter Gordon chronology
Doin' Allright (1961)	Dexter Calling... (1962)	Landslide (1961-62)

Dexter Calling... is an album by American jazz saxophonist Dexter Gordon recorded in 1961 and released on the Blue Note label in 1962. "Soul Sister", "I Want More" and "Ernie's Tune" were written for the Los Angeles production of the play The Connection by Jack Gelber in 1960. Dexter Calling was Gordon's second album for Blue Note, and was recorded three days after Doin' Allright, his first album for the label.

== Reception ==
The Billboard Reviewer called the album "solid jazz wax" and noted that it featured "some fine blowing by the tenor saxist".

The Allmusic review by Michael G. Nastos awarded the album 4 stars stating "Dexter Gordon's second recording for the Blue Note label is a solidly swinging affair, yet constantly full of surprises... The excellent band, solid musicianship, and memorable music on every track make this one of the more essential recordings of Gordon's career".

Professional ratings
Review scores
Source	Rating
Allmusic	4/5 stars
The Rolling Stone Jazz Record Guide	5/5 stars
The Penguin Guide to Jazz Recordings	3/4 stars

== Track listing ==
All compositions by Dexter Gordon except as indicated

1. "Soul Sister" - 7:45
2. "Modal Mood" (Kenny Drew) - 5:23
3. "I Want More" - 5:20
4. "The End of a Love Affair" (Edward Redding) - 6:53
5. "Clear the Dex" (Kenny Drew) - 4:54
6. "Ernie's Tune" - 4:16
7. "Smile" (Charlie Chaplin) - 3:23
8. "Landslide" - 5:15 Bonus track on CD reissue

The bonus track does not appear on the Blue Note 2015 remastered digital media release.

== Personnel ==
- Dexter Gordon - tenor saxophone
- Kenny Drew - piano
- Paul Chambers - bass
- Philly Joe Jones - drums
