= Dexter Blows Hot and Cool =

Studio album by Dexter Gordon
- Released: December 1955
- Genre: Jazz
- Label: Dooto; DL-207

Dexter Gordon chronology
Daddy Plays the Horn (1955)	Dexter Blows Hot and Cool (1955)	The Resurgence of Dexter Gordon (1960)

Dexter Blows Hot and Cool is a 1955 album by jazz musician Dexter Gordon.

== Reception ==
The Billboard Reviewer noted that Gordon appeared "somewhat mellowed, making little attempt to impress either as a technician or melodic innovator" but that there was "a quiet authority in his forthright, simply tailored style". Pianist Carl Perkins was lauded as "a newcomer loaded with talent and far-out ideas".

== Track listing ==
1. "Silver Plated" (Gordon)
2. "Cry Me a River" (Hamilton)
3. "Rhythm Mad" (Gordon)
4. "Don't Worry About Me" (Bloom, Koehler)
5. "I Hear Music" (Lane, Losser)
6. "Bonna Rue" (Gordon)
7. "I Should Care" (Cahn, Stordahl, Weston)
8. "Blowin' For Dootsie" (Gordon)
9. "Tenderly" (Gross, Lawrence)

== Personnel ==
- Dexter Gordon — Tenor saxophone
- Jimmy Robinson — Trumpet
- Carl Perkins — Piano
- Leroy Vinnegar — Bass
- Chuck Thompson — Drums

Recorded on November 11 and 12, 1955
