= Dexter Gordon with Junior Mance at Montreux =

Live album by Dexter Gordon and Junior Mance
- Released: 1970
- Recorded: June 18, 1970; Montreux, Switzerland
- Genre: Jazz
- Length: 55:18 CD reissue with bonus track
- Label: Prestige; PR 7861
- Producer: Joel Dorn and Michael Cuscuna

Dexter Gordon chronology
Some Other Spring (1970)	Dexter Gordon with Junior Mance at Montreux (1970)	The Panther! (1970)

Junior Mance chronology
With a Lotta Help from My Friends (1970)	Dexter Gordon with Junior Mance at Montreux (1970)	That Lovin' Feelin' (1972)

Professional ratings
Review scores
Source	Rating
AllMusic	4/5 stars
The Penguin Guide to Jazz Recordings	3/4 stars

Dexter Gordon with Junior Mance at Montreux is a live album by saxophonist Dexter Gordon and pianist Junior Mance recorded at the Montreux Jazz Festival in 1970 and released on the Prestige label.

== Reception ==
The AllMusic review by Scott Yanow stated: "This excellent CD serves as a fine all-around introduction to the music of the great tenor-saxophonist."

== Track listing ==
All compositions by Dexter Gordon except where noted.

1. "Fried Bananas" – 8:12
2. "Sophisticated Lady" (Duke Ellington, Irving Mills, Mitchell Parish) – 7:54
3. "Rhythm-a-Ning" (Thelonious Monk) – 8:40
4. "Body and Soul" (Frank Eyton, Johnny Green, Edward Heyman, Robert Sour) – 10:15
5. "Blue Monk" (Monk) – 10:50
6. "The Panther" – 9:27 Bonus track on CD reissue

== Personnel ==
- Dexter Gordon – tenor saxophone
- Junior Mance – piano
- Martin Rivera – bass
- Oliver Jackson – drums
