= The Panther! =

Studio album by Dexter Gordon
- Released: 1970
- Recorded: July 7, 1970; New York City
- Genre: Jazz
- Length: 43:23
- Label: Prestige; PR 7829
- Producer: Don Schlitten

Dexter Gordon chronology
Dexter Gordon with Junior Mance at Montreux (1970)	The Panther! (1970)	The Chase! (1970)

The Panther! is an album by saxophonist Dexter Gordon that was recorded in 1970 and released on the Prestige label.

== Reception ==
Professional ratings
Review scores
Source	Rating
Allmusic	4/5 stars
DownBeat	5/5 stars
The Penguin Guide to Jazz Recordings	3.5/4 stars
The Rolling Stone Jazz Record Guide	5/5 stars

Lindsay Planer of Allmusic states, "Dexter Gordon (tenor sax) entered the 1970s -- as well as his career's quarter-century mark -- on a definite upstroke with the sly, sexy -- and above else -- stylish platter The Panther!"

== Track listing ==
All compositions by Dexter Gordon except as indicated

1. "The Panther" - 6:29
2. "Body and Soul" (Frank Eyton, Johnny Green, Edward Heyman, Robert Sour) - 11:01
3. "Valse Robin" - 5:56
4. "Mrs. Miniver" - 7:38
5. "The Christmas Song" (Mel Tormé, Robert Wells) - 5:23
6. "The Blues Walk" (Clifford Brown) - 7:21

== Personnel ==
- Dexter Gordon - tenor saxophone
- Tommy Flanagan - piano
- Larry Ridley - bass
- Alan Dawson - drums
