= The Rainbow People (album) =

Live album by Dexter Gordon and Benny Bailey
- Released: 2002
- Recorded: November 1974; Sweden
- Genre: Jazz
- Length: 64:32
- Label: SteepleChase; SCCD-31521
- Producer: Nils Winther

Dexter Gordon chronology
Revelation (1974)	The Rainbow People (2002)	More Than You Know (1975)

Benny Bailey chronology
Revelation (1974)	The Rainbow People (1974)	Islands (1976)

The Rainbow People is a live album by American saxophonist Dexter Gordon and trumpeter Benny Bailey, recorded in Sweden in 1974 and released on the SteepleChase label in 2002.

== Critical reception ==
Professional ratings
Review scores
Source	Rating
AllMusic	4/5 stars
The Penguin Guide to Jazz Recordings	3/4 stars

AllMusic critic David R. Adler stated "This previously unreleased live recording, from a 1974 Scandinavian tour, highlights the strong partnership of Dexter Gordon and trumpeter Benny Bailey. ... Happily, the disc captures Gordon in excellent form. From the very first minutes, his tonal command and forceful yet laid-back swing transport the listener. Bailey's playing is extroverted, full of brash wit."

== Track listing ==
All compositions by Dexter Gordon except where noted.

1. "The Rainbow People" – 16:35
2. "I Can't Get Started" (Vernon Duke, Ira Gershwin) – 11:57
3. "C Jam Blues" (Duke Ellington, Barney Bigard) – 15:09
4. "Montmartre" – 20:49

== Personnel ==
- Dexter Gordon – tenor saxophone
- Benny Bailey – trumpet
- Lars Sjösten – piano
- Torbjörn Hultcrantz – bass
- Jual Curtis – drums
