= Homecoming: Live at the Village Vanguard =

Homecoming: Dexter Gordon Live at the Village Vanguard

Live album by Dexter Gordon
- Released: 1977
- Recorded: New York, 1976 December 11, 12
- Venue: The Village Vanguard
- Genre: Jazz
- Length: 1:41:43
- Label: Columbia
- Producer: Michael Cuscuna

Dexter Gordon chronology
Biting the Apple (1976)	Homecoming: Dexter Gordon Live at the Village Vanguard (1977)	Sophisticated Giant (1977)

Professional ratings
Review scores
Source	Rating
AllMusic	4.5/5 stars

Homecoming is a live double LP by jazz saxophonist Dexter Gordon, recorded at the Village Vanguard in New York City in 1976. The album's title refers to Gordon's return to the United States after a long residency in Europe.

== Track listing ==
LP 1
Side A

1. “Gingerbread Boy” (Jimmy Heath) - 13:29
2. “Little Red's Fantasy” (Woody Shaw) - 12:30

Side B

1. “Fenja” (Dexter Gordon) - 12:34
2. “In Case You Haven't Heard” (Woody Shaw) - 10:55

LP 2
Side C

1. “It's You or No One” (Jule Styne, Sammy Cahn) - 13:46
2. “Let's Get Down” (Ronnie Mathews) - 13:03

Side D

1. “Round Midnight” (Hanighen, Williams, Monk) - 13:06
2. “Backstairs” (Dexter Gordon) - 12:20

+ 2 bonus tracks on the 1990 CD re-issue - from the same 1976 Village Vanguard recording session:

- “Fried Bananas” (Gordon) - 14:34
- ”Body and Soul" (Johnny Green, Frank Eyton, Edward Heyman, Robert Sour) - 13:10

== Personnel ==
- Dexter Gordon – tenor saxophone
- Woody Shaw – trumpet, flugelhorn
- Ronnie Mathews – piano
- Stafford James – bass
- Louis Hayes – drums
