= The Squirrel (album) =

Live album by Dexter Gordon
- Released: 1997
- Recorded: June 29, 1967
- Venue: Jazzhus Montmartre, Copenhagen, Denmark
- Genre: Jazz
- Length: 66:18
- Label: Blue Note; CDP 7243 8 57302 2 1
- Producer: Ib Skovgaard

Dexter Gordon chronology
Stella by Starlight (1966)	The Squirrel (1997)	Both Sides of Midnight (1967)

The Squirrel (subtitled Live in Montmatre, Copenhagen '67) is a live album by American saxophonist Dexter Gordon recorded at the Jazzhus Montmartre in Copenhagen, Denmark in 1967 by Danmarks Radio and released on the Blue Note label in 1997.

== Critical reception ==
Professional ratings
Review scores
Source	Rating
AllMusic	3/5 stars
The Penguin Guide to Jazz Recordings	3.5/4 stars

AllMusic critic Scott Yanow stated "the great Dexter really stretches out on four numbers ... The recording quality is decent, if not flawless, but Gordon's playing is often quite passionate ... Although not essential this set finds the tenor in excellent form". On All About Jazz Joel Roberts observed "To hear Dexter Gordon live in this period is to hear one of the most powerful instrumentalists in jazz at the very top of his form. On four extended numbers, clocking in at between twelve and twenty minutes, Gordon plays fast, furious and remarkably athletic tenor alongside an outstanding rhythm section".

== Track listing ==
1. "The Squirrel" (Tadd Dameron) – 15:25
2. "Cheese Cake" (Dexter Gordon) – 20:43
3. "You've Changed" (Carl T. Fischer, Bill Carey) – 12:25
4. "Sonnymoon for Two" (Sonny Rollins) – 17:45

== Personnel ==
- Dexter Gordon – tenor saxophone
- Kenny Drew – piano
- Bo Stief – bass
- Art Taylor – drums
