= Sophisticated Giant =

Studio album by Dexter Gordon
- Released: 1977
- Recorded: June 1977
- Genre: Jazz
- Length: 45:39
- Label: Columbia
- Producer: Michael Cuscuna

Dexter Gordon chronology
Homecoming: Live at the Village Vanguard (1977)	Sophisticated Giant (1977)	Manhattan Symphonie (1978)

Sophisticated Giant is a jazz album by saxophonist Dexter Gordon, recorded in 1977 by an eleven-piece band playing tunes arranged by trombone player Slide Hampton. The album marked Gordon's return to the United States after a long residency in Europe.

== Reception ==
Professional ratings
Review scores
Source	Rating
AllMusic	4/5 stars
DownBeat	5/5 stars
The Penguin Guide to Jazz Recordings	2.5/4 stars
The Rolling Stone Jazz Record Guide	3/5 stars

The Bay State Banner wrote that "Slide Hampton's library of duets, solos, rhythm, harmony, and intense ensemble choruses have variety, but also a consistent deployment of moods and gambits."

AllMusic reviewer Scott Yanow called the album "an excellent acquisition."

== Track listing ==
=== Side one ===
1. "Laura" (David Raksin) – 7:37
2. "The Moontrane" (Woody Shaw) – 6:36
3. "Red Top" (Lionel Hampton, Ben Kynard) – 8:51

=== Side two ===
1. "Fried Bananas" (Dexter Gordon) – 7:53
2. "You're Blasé" (Ord Hamilton, Bruce Sievier) – 9:49
3. "How Insensitive" (Antônio Carlos Jobim, Vinícius de Moraes) – 4:53

All tunes arranged by Slide Hampton
Recorded June 21 & 22, 1977 at Sound Ideas, NYC by William Wittman

== Personnel ==
- Dexter Gordon — tenor and soprano saxophone
- Frank Wess — alto saxophone, flute, piccolo
- Woody Shaw — trumpet, flugelhorn
- Benny Bailey — lead trumpet, flugelhorn
- Slide Hampton — trombone
- Wayne Andre — lead trombone
- Howard Johnson — tuba, baritone saxophone
- Bobby Hutcherson — vibes
- George Cables — piano
- Rufus Reid — bass
- Victor Lewis — drums

Technical

- William Wittman — engineer, recording, mixing
