= Dexter Rides Again =

Studio album by Dexter Gordon
- Released: 1958
- Recorded: October 30, 1945, January 29, 1946, December 11, 1947
- Genre: Jazz
- Length: 36:11
- Label: Savoy Records
- Producer: Ozzie Cadena

Dexter Gordon chronology
Dexter Rides Again (1958)	The Hunt (1947)

Professional ratings
Review scores
Source	Rating
AllMusic	4.5/5 stars

Dexter Rides Again is a 1958 jazz album by saxophonist Dexter Gordon, assembled from his 1940s recordings for the Savoy label.

== Track listing ==
Except where otherwise noted, all songs composed by Dexter Gordon.

1. "Dexter's Riff" – 2:43
2. "Settin' the Pace, Parts 1 & 2" – 5:52
3. "So Easy" – 3:38
4. "Long Tall Dexter" – 3:00
5. "Dexter Rides Again" (Dexter Gordon, Bud Powell) – 3:14
6. "I Can't Escape from You" (Leo Robin, Richard Whiting) – 3:13
7. "Dexter Digs In" – 2:56
8. "Dexter's Minor Mad" – 2:40
9. "Blow Mr. Dexter" – 2:55
10. "Dexter's Deck" – 2:54
11. "Dexter's Cuttin' Out" – 3:06

== Personnel ==
- Dexter Gordon – tenor saxophone (all tracks)

Tracks 1–3, December 11, 1947.

- Leo Parker – baritone saxophone
- Tadd Dameron – piano
- Curly Russell – bass
- Art Blakey – drums

Tracks 4–7, January 29, 1946.

- Leonard Hawkins – trumpet
- Bud Powell – piano
- Curly Russell – bass
- Max Roach – drums

Tracks 8–11, October 30, 1945.

- Sadik Hakim – piano
- Gene Ramey – bass
- Ed Nicholson – drums
