= The Chase! =

Live album by Dexter Gordon and Gene Ammons
- Released: 1970
- Recorded: July 26, 1970
- Venue: North Park Hotel, Chicago, Illinois
- Genre: Jazz
- Length: 70:49 CD reissue with bonus tracks
- Label: Prestige; PR 10010
- Producer: Chuck Nessa

Gene Ammons chronology
Night Lights (1970)	The Chase! (1970)	The Black Cat! (1970)

Dexter Gordon chronology
The Panther! (1970)	The Chase! (1970)	The Jumpin' Blues (1970)

The Chase! is a live album by the saxophonists Dexter Gordon and Gene Ammons recorded in Chicago in 1970 and released on the Prestige label.

== Reception ==
Professional ratings
Review scores
Source	Rating
AllMusic	4/5 stars
The Penguin Guide to Jazz Recordings	2.5/4 stars
The Rolling Stone Jazz Record Guide	4/5 stars
The Virgin Encyclopedia of Jazz	3/5 stars

In a review for AllMusic, Scott Yanow stated: "this CD is highly recommended to fans of tenor battles and straight-ahead jazz... Jug and Gordon... are heard in prime, combative form."

A writer for Billboard wrote: "When together the accent is on excitement as the two musicians push each other onwards."

== Track listing ==
1. "Wee Dot" (J. J. Johnson) - 17:17 Bonus track on CD reissue
2. "Polka Dots and Moonbeams" (Johnny Burke, Jimmy Van Heusen) - 10:07
3. "The Chase" (Dexter Gordon, Wardell Gray) - 10:29
4. "Medley: Lover Man (Oh, Where Can You Be?)/I Can't Get Started/My Funny Valentine/Misty" (Jimmy Davis, Ram Ramirez, James Sherman/Ira Gershwin, Vernon Duke/Lorenz Hart, Richard Rodgers/Erroll Garner) - 14:03 Bonus track on CD reissue
5. "Lonesome Lover Blues" (Billy Eckstine, Gerald Valentine) - 13:25
6. "The Happy Blues" (Art Farmer) - 5:26

== Personnel ==
- Gene Ammons (tracks 3–6), Dexter Gordon (tracks 1–5) - tenor saxophone
- Jodie Christian (tracks 3–5), John Young (tracks 1, 2 & 6) - piano
- Cleveland Eaton (tracks 1, 2 & 6), Rufus Reid (tracks 3–5) - double bass
- Wilbur Campbell (tracks 3–5), Steve McCall (tracks 1, 2 & 6) - drums
- Vi Redd - vocal (track 5)
