= The Hunt (Dexter Gordon album) =

Studio album by Dexter Gordon
- Released: 1977
- Recorded: July 6, 1947
- Genre: Jazz
- Length: 77:52
- Label: Savoy
- Producer: Steve Backer, Ralph Bass

Dexter Gordon chronology
Dexter Rides Again (1947)	The Hunt (1977)	The Duel (1947)

Professional ratings
Review scores
Source	Rating
AllMusic	3/5 stars

The Hunt is a 1977 jazz album of performances from 1947 by a nonet featuring saxophonists Dexter Gordon and Wardell Gray. The title song is referenced in the book On the Road by Jack Kerouac.

== Track listing ==
1. "Disorder at the Border" – 19:20
2. "Cherokee" – 21:12
3. "Byas-A-Drink" – 19:15
4. "The Hunt (A/K/A Rocks 'n Shoals)" – 18:05

== Personnel ==
- Dexter Gordon – tenor saxophone
- Harry Babasin – double bass
- Red Callender – double bass
- Sonny Criss – alto saxophone
- Wardell Gray – tenor saxophone
- Hampton Hawes – piano
- Connie Kay – drums
- Barney Kessel – guitar
- Ken Kennedy – drums
- Howard McGhee – trumpet
- Trummy Young – trombone
