= The Tower of Power! =

Studio album by Dexter Gordon
- Released: 1969
- Recorded: April 2 & 4, 1969; New York City
- Genre: Jazz
- Length: 35:47
- Labels: Prestige; PR 7623
- Producer: Don Schlitten

Dexter Gordon chronology
A Day in Copenhagen (1969)	The Tower of Power! (1969)	More Power! (1969)

The Tower of Power! is an album by saxophonist Dexter Gordon which was recorded in 1969 and released on the Prestige label.

== Reception ==
Professional ratings
Review scores
Source	Rating
AllMusic	4/5 stars
DownBeat	5/5 stars
The Penguin Guide to Jazz Recordings	3/4 stars
The Rolling Stone Jazz Record Guide	4/5 stars

Lindsay Planer of AllMusic states, "Dexter Gordon (tenor sax) returned to the United States in the spring of 1969 to create his first studio recordings in nearly a decade... Gordon selflessly provides copious space to his bandmates, a quality that certainly makes selections such as these a pleasure to revisit".

== Track listing ==
All compositions by Dexter Gordon except as indicated

1. "Montmartre" (Dexter Gordon, Rex Stewart) – 10:54
2. "The Rainbow People" – 8:49
3. "Stanley the Steamer" – 8:02
4. "Those Were the Days" (Gene Raskin) – 8:02

== Personnel ==
- Dexter Gordon – tenor saxophone
- James Moody – tenor saxophone (track 1)
- Barry Harris – piano
- Buster Williams – bass
- Albert "Tootie" Heath – drums
