= Daddy Plays the Horn =

Studio album by Dexter Gordon
- Released: 1955
- Recorded: September 18, 1955
- Genre: Jazz
- Length: 41:39
- Label: Bethlehem
- Producer: Steve Backer, Ralph Bass

Dexter Gordon chronology
The Duel (1947)	Daddy Plays the Horn (1955)	Dexter Blows Hot and Cool (1955)

Daddy Plays the Horn is a 1955 jazz album by saxophonist Dexter Gordon.

== Reception ==
Professional ratings
Review scores
Source	Rating
Allmusic	4/5 stars
The Penguin Guide to Jazz	3/4 stars
Tom Hull	A−

The Billboard review stated that the album was "not too original, but it swings" and mentioned that Gordon played "some top-flight, Lester Young-inspired tenor here, with a more robust sound than that of the master or most of his other disciples". The Penguin Guide to Jazz awarded it three out of four stars, saying "Daddy would be worth the purchase for 'Confirmation' and 'Autumn in New York'... Drew and Vinnegar play exceptionally well, and the CD transfer is generally good."

== Track listing ==
1. "Daddy Plays the Horn" (Gordon) (9:11)
2. "Confirmation" (Charlie Parker) (7:50)
3. "Darn That Dream" (Jimmy Van Heusen & Eddie DeLange) (4:21)
4. "Number Four" (Gordon) (4:51)
5. "Autumn in New York" (Vernon Duke) (6:30)
6. "You Can Depend on Me" (Charles Carpenter, Louis Dunlap, & Earl Hines) (8:59)

== Personnel ==
- Dexter Gordon – tenor saxophone
- Kenny Drew – piano
- Leroy Vinnegar – bass
- Lawrence Marable – drums

== In popular culture ==
The album is mentioned several times in the novels The Talisman and Black House by Stephen King and Peter Straub.
