= Doin' Allright =

Studio album by Dexter Gordon
- Released: August 1961
- Recorded: May 6, 1961
- Studio: Van Gelder Studio, Englewood Cliffs, NJ
- Genre: Jazz
- Length: 41:03 original LP; 53:34 CD reissue
- Label: Blue Note; BST 84077
- Producer: Alfred Lion

Dexter Gordon chronology
The Resurgence of Dexter Gordon (1960)	Doin' Allright (1961)	Dexter Calling... (1961)

Doin' Allright is an album by American jazz saxophonist Dexter Gordon recorded in 1961 and released on the Blue Note label.

== Reception ==
Professional ratings
Review scores
Source	Rating
Allmusic	4/5 stars
The Rolling Stone Jazz Record Guide	4/5 stars
The Penguin Guide to Jazz Recordings	4/4 stars

The Allmusic review by Scott Yanow awarded the album 4 stars and stating "The title of this Blue Note set, Doin' Allright, fit perfectly at the time, for tenor saxophonist Dexter Gordon was making the first of three successful comebacks. Largely neglected during the 1950s, Gordon's Blue Note recordings (of which this was the first) led to his "rediscovery".

== Track listing ==
All compositions by Dexter Gordon except as indicated

1. "I Was Doing All Right" (George Gershwin, Ira Gershwin) - 9:18
2. "You've Changed" (Bill Carey, Carl T. Fischer) - 7:26
3. "For Regulars Only" - 5:45
4. "Society Red" - 12:21
5. "It's You or No One" (Sammy Cahn, Jule Styne) - 6:13
6. "I Want More" - 6:11 Bonus track on CD reissue
7. "For Regulars Only" [Alternate take] - 6:20 Bonus track on CD reissue

== Personnel ==
- Dexter Gordon - tenor saxophone
- Freddie Hubbard - trumpet
- Horace Parlan - piano
- George Tucker - bass
- Al Harewood - drums
