= Biting the Apple =

Studio album by Dexter Gordon Quartet
- Released: 1977
- Recorded: November 9, 1976
- Studio: CI Recording Studios, NYC
- Genre: Jazz
- Length: 56:15 CD with bonus tracks
- Label: SteepleChase SCS 1080
- Producer: Nils Winther

Dexter Gordon chronology
Silver Blue (1976)	Biting the Apple (1977)	Homecoming (1976)

Biting the Apple is an album led by saxophonist Dexter Gordon recorded in 1976 and released on the Danish SteepleChase label. The album was released in the U.S. in collaboration with Inner City Records. The album's title refers to Gordon's return to New York City for a 1976 performance after living abroad for many years.

== Reception ==
Professional ratings
Review scores
Source	Rating
AllMusic	4.5/5 stars
The Penguin Guide to Jazz Recordings	3.5/4 stars

In his review for AllMusic, Scott Yanow said "It is highly recommended, as are all of Dexter Gordon's SteepleChase recordings from this period".

== Track listing ==
1. "Apple Jump" (Dexter Gordon) – 11:28
2. "I'll Remember April" (Gene de Paul, Patricia Johnston, Don Raye) – 7:30
3. "Georgia on My Mind" (Hoagy Carmichael, Stuart Gorrell) – 9:58 Bonus track on CD reissue
4. "Blue Bossa" (Kenny Dorham) – 8:49 Bonus track on CD reissue
5. "Skylark" (Carmichael, Johnny Mercer) – 8:36
6. "A La Modal" (Gordon) – 10:05

== Personnel ==
- Dexter Gordon – tenor saxophone
- Barry Harris – piano
- Sam Jones – bass
- Al Foster – drums
