= Our Man in Paris =

Studio album by Dexter Gordon
- Released: December 1963
- Recorded: May 23, 1963
- Studio: CBS Studios, Paris
- Genre: Jazz
- Length: 38:05; 50:03 (reissue)
- Label: Blue Note; BLP 4146
- Producer: Francis Wolff

Dexter Gordon chronology
Go! (1962)	Our Man in Paris (1963)	A Swingin' Affair (1964)

Professional ratings
Review scores
Source	Rating
All About Jazz	5/5 stars
Allmusic	4.5/5 stars
The Guardian	4/5 stars
The Penguin Guide to Jazz	4/4 stars
The Rolling Stone Jazz Record Guide	5/5 stars
Encyclopedia of Popular Music	5/5 stars

Our Man in Paris is a 1963 jazz album by saxophonist Dexter Gordon. The album's title refers to where the recording was made, Gordon (who had moved to Copenhagen a year earlier) teaming up with fellow expatriates Bud Powell and Kenny Clarke, both Parisian residents, and native Parisian Pierre Michelot. Powell, Clarke and Michelot, under the name The Three Bosses, had played together often in Paris since Powell moved there in 1959.

The album was remastered by Rudy Van Gelder in 2003 and released as part of Blue Note's RVG Edition series.

== Music ==
The original intention was for the pianist on the recording to be Kenny Drew and for the music to be new compositions by Gordon. However, the actual pianist used was Bud Powell, who would not play new music, so jazz standards were chosen during the rehearsal. The two tracks added to the CD release were originally issued by Blue Note on Bud Powell's Alternate Takes in 1985.

== Critical reception ==
The Penguin Guide to Jazz gave it a maximum four-star rating and added it to the core collection, commenting that Gordon's playing on "A Night in Tunisia" "is one of his finest performances on record" and concluding that the album is "a classic". The review of the 2003 remastered version in The Guardian was similarly positive, stating that it is "one of the all-time classics".

Marc Davis, writing for All About Jazz, described Gordon's playing on the opening track as "on fire" and Powell's as "sublime". He concluded, "If [Our Man in Paris] not in your collection, it should be. Gordon is one of the all-time best boppers, and Paris is arguably his best recording."

== Track listing ==
=== Original release ===
Side one
No.	Title	Writer(s)	Length
1.	"Scrapple from the Apple"	Charlie Parker	7:22
2.	"Willow Weep for Me"	Ann Ronell	8:47

Side two
No.	Title	Writer(s)	Length
1.	"Broadway"	Billy Bird; Teddy McRae; Henri Woode	6:44
2.	"Stairway to the Stars"	Matty Malneck; Mitchell Parish; Frank Signorelli	6:57
3.	"A Night in Tunisia"	Dizzy Gillespie; Frank Paparelli	8:15

=== CD reissue bonus tracks ===
No.	Title	Writer(s)	Length
6.	"Our Love Is Here to Stay"	George Gershwin; Ira Gershwin	5:39
7.	"Like Someone in Love"	Jimmy Van Heusen; Johnny Burke	6:19

== Personnel ==
Musicians

- Dexter Gordon – tenor saxophone (except track 7)
- Bud Powell – piano
- Pierre Michelot – bass
- Kenny Clarke – drums

Production

- Francis Wolff – production and cover photography
- Reid Miles – cover design
- Claude Ermelin – recording engineering
- Ron McMaster – digital transfer engineering

== Charts ==
Chart performance for Our Man in Paris
Chart (2025)	Peak position
Greek Albums (IFPI)	63
