= Take the "A" Train (Dexter Gordon album) =

Live album by Dexter Gordon
- Released: 1989
- Recorded: July 21, 1967
- Venue: Jazzhus Montmartre, Copenhagen, Denmark
- Genre: Jazz
- Length: 66:39
- Label: Black Lion; BLP 60133
- Producer: Alan Bates

Dexter Gordon chronology
Body and Soul (1967)	Take the "A" Train (1989)	After Hours (1969)

Take the "A" Train is a live album by American saxophonist Dexter Gordon recorded at the Jazzhus Montmartre in Copenhagen, Denmark in 1967 and first released on the Black Lion label in 1989.

== Critical reception ==
Professional ratings
Review scores
Source	Rating
AllMusic	4.5/5 stars
All About Jazz	4.25 stars on a 5 point scale
The Penguin Guide to Jazz Recordings	3/4 stars

AllMusic critic Scott Yanow stated, "Throughout, Dexter Gordon is in consistently creative form, making this CD well worth getting by his fans." On All About Jazz James Nichols said, "We hear his immensely personal dry tone, humorous popular song quotes, very creative bebop solos and his listless and steadily paced baritone voice performing master of ceremonies duties. Very enjoyable, pick it up if you run across it."

== Track listing ==
1. Introduction by Dexter Gordon – 0:59
2. "But Not for Me" (George Gershwin, Ira Gershwin) – 15:13
3. "Take the "A" Train" (Billy Strayhorn) – 10:34
4. "For All We Know" [2nd Version] (J. Fred Coots, Sam M. Lewis) – 8:35 Bonus track on CD release
5. "Blues Walk" [2nd Version] (Clifford Brown) – 11:01 Bonus track on CD release
6. "I Guess I'll Have to Hang My Tears out to Dry" (Jule Styne, Sammy Cahn) – 6:08
7. "Love for Sale" (Cole Porter) – 15:03

== Personnel ==
- Dexter Gordon – tenor saxophone
- Kenny Drew – piano
- Niels-Henning Ørsted Pedersen – bass
- Albert Heath – drums
