= A Swingin' Affair =

Studio album by Dexter Gordon
- Released: Early October 1964
- Recorded: August 29, 1962
- Studio: Van Gelder Studio, Englewood Cliffs, New Jersey
- Genre: Jazz
- Length: 38:27
- Label: Blue Note; BLP 4133
- Producer: Alfred Lion

Dexter Gordon chronology
Our Man in Paris (1963)	A Swingin' Affair (1964)	One Flight Up (1965)

A Swingin' Affair is an album recorded in 1962 by saxophonist Dexter Gordon, recorded two days after Go! with the same line-up, but not released for two years.

== Recording and music ==
The album was recorded at Van Gelder Studio, Englewood Cliffs, New Jersey, on August 29, 1962. Gordon's quartet contained pianist Sonny Clark, bassist Butch Warren, and drummer Billy Higgins. Of the six compositions, three are standards, two were written by Gordon, and one was contributed by Warren.

== Release and reception ==
Professional ratings
Review scores
Source	Rating
AllMusic	4/5 stars
The Penguin Guide to Jazz	3/4 stars
The Rolling Stone Jazz Record Guide	5/5 stars

A Swingin' Affair was released in early October 1964. The Penguin Guide to Jazz picked "You Stepped Out of a Dream" as the album's highlight, but described the session as a "not altogether riveting date."

== Track listing ==
No.	Title	Writer(s)	Length
1.	"Soy Califa"	Gordon	6:27
2.	"Don't Explain"	Arthur Herzog Jr.; Billie Holiday	6:06
3.	"You Stepped out of a Dream"	Nacio Brown; Gus Kahn	6:34

No.	Title	Writer(s)	Length
1.	"The Backbone"	Butch Warren	6:48
2.	"Until the Real Thing Comes Along"	Sammy Cahn; Saul Chaplin; L.E. Freeman; Mann Holiner; Alberta Nichols	6:49
3.	"McSplivens"	Gordon	5:43

== Personnel ==
- Dexter Gordon – tenor saxophone
- Sonny Clark – piano
- Butch Warren – bass
- Billy Higgins – drums
