= Gettin' Around =

Studio album by Dexter Gordon
- Released: Mid August 1966
- Recorded: May 28–29, 1965
- Studio: Van Gelder Studio; Englewood Cliffs
- Genre: Jazz
- Length: 41:31 original LP; 59:01 CD reissue
- Label: Blue Note; BLP 4204
- Producer: Alfred Lion

Dexter Gordon chronology
One Flight Up (1965)	Gettin' Around (1966)	Setting the Pace (1966)

Gettin' Around is an album by American jazz saxophonist Dexter Gordon recorded over two days in May 1965 and released by Blue Note the following year. The CD reissue added two bonus tracks from the same session.

== Reception ==
The review in Billboard magazine in 1966 called Gordon's playing "cool and hot", especially praising his improvisations on "Heartaches". The support of the rhythm section was said to be "A-1 all the way".

The AllMusic review by Michael G. Nastos was less enthusiastic stated: "While this is not Gordon's ultimate hard bop date, it is reflective of his cooling out in Europe, adopting a tonal emphasis more under the surface than in your face. It's not essential, but quite enjoyable, and does mark a turning point in his illustrious career."

Professional ratings
Review scores
Source	Rating
AllMusic	3.5/5 stars
The Penguin Guide to Jazz Recordings	3.5/4 stars

== Track listing ==
1. "Manhã de Carnaval" (Luiz Bonfá, Antonio Maria) – 8:26
2. "Who Can I Turn To (When Nobody Needs Me)" (Leslie Bricusse, Anthony Newley) – 5:15
3. "Heartaches" (Al Hoffman, John Klenner) – 7:46
4. "Shiny Stockings" (Frank Foster) – 6:18
5. "Everybody's Somebody's Fool" (Howard Greenfield, Jack Keller) – 6:45
6. "Le Coiffeur" (Dexter Gordon) – 7:01
7. "Very Saxily Yours" – 6:54 (Onzy Matthews) Bonus track on CD reissue
8. "Flick of a Trick" – 10:36 (Ben Tucker) Bonus track on CD reissue

Recorded on May 28 (1, 5–6, 8) and May 29 (2–4, 7), 1965.

== Personnel ==
- Dexter Gordon – tenor saxophone
- Bobby Hutcherson – vibes
- Barry Harris – piano
- Bob Cranshaw – bass
- Billy Higgins – drums
