= The Resurgence of Dexter Gordon =

Studio album by Dexter Gordon
- Released: 1960
- Recorded: October 13, 1960
- Studio: United Recording Studios, Los Angeles, CA
- Genre: Jazz
- Label: Jazzland; JLP 29
- Producer: Cannonball Adderley

Dexter Gordon chronology
Dexter Blows Hot and Cool (1955)	The Resurgence of Dexter Gordon (1960)	Doin' Allright (1961)

The Resurgence of Dexter Gordon is an album by American saxophonist Dexter Gordon recorded in 1960 and released on the Jazzland label.

== Critical reception ==
Professional ratings
Review scores
Source	Rating
AllMusic	4/5 stars
The Penguin Guide to Jazz Recordings	2.5/4 stars

AllMusic critic Lindsay Planer stated "As the title The Resurgence of Dexter Gordon (1960) suggests, the tenor sax master resurfaced from his chronic bouts of addiction in an attempt to revive his on-again/off-again recording career. Truth be told, Gordon was actually on parole from Chino State Penitentiary and co-starring in a local Los Angeles production of The Connection -- a play ironically enough about the victims of heroin dependence. Julian "Cannonball" Adderley was able to talk the tenor into participating in a no-strings-attached studio date ... The tunes are complex and provide insight into Gordon's flawless improvisational prowess ... The Resurgence of Dexter Gordon uncovers the immeasurable talents of an artist whose musical journey passes a critical crossroads on this project".

== Track listing ==
All compositions by Dexter Gordon except where noted.

1. "Home Run" – 5:06
2. "Dolo" (Dolo Coker) – 6:14
3. "Lovely Lisa" (Coker) – 7:16
4. "Affair in Havana" (Coker) – 7:38
5. "Jodi" – 6:37
6. "Field Day" (Coker) – 6:41

== Personnel ==
- Dexter Gordon – tenor saxophone
- Martin Banks – trumpet (tracks 1–4 & 6)
- Richard Boone – trombone (tracks 1–4 & 6)
- Dolo Coker – piano
- Charles Green – bass
- Lawrence Marable – drums
