= Swiss Nights Vol. 3 =

Live album by Dexter Gordon Quartet
- Released: 1979
- Recorded: 23 & 24 August 1975 at the Zurich Jazz Festival in Zurich, Switzerland
- Genre: Jazz
- Length: 65:32 CD with bonus tracks
- Label: SteepleChase SCS 1110
- Producer: Nils Winther

Dexter Gordon chronology
Swiss Nights Vol. 2 (1975)	Swiss Nights Vol. 3 (1979)	Something Different (1975)

Swiss Nights Vol. 3 is a live album led by saxophonist Dexter Gordon recorded in Zurich in 1975 and released on the Danish SteepleChase label in 1979.

== Reception ==
Professional ratings
Review scores
Source	Rating
AllMusic	4/5 stars
The Penguin Guide to Jazz Recordings	2.5/4 stars

In his review for AllMusic, Scott Yanow said "The third of three CDs taken from tenor saxophonist Dexter Gordon's appearances at the 1975 Zurich Jazz Festival has more variety than the other two. ...With pianist Kenny Drew, bassist Niels-Henning Orsted Pedersen and drummer Alex Riel offering strong support, Dexter Gordon is heard in enthusiastic, hard-swinging form".

== Track listing ==
1. Introduction – 0:06 Bonus track on CD reissue
2. "Tenor Madness" (Sonny Rollins) – 12:29 Bonus track on CD reissue
3. "Jelly, Jelly" (Billy Eckstine) – 12:47
4. "Didn't We?" (Jimmy Webb) – 9:08
5. "Days of Wine and Roses" (Henry Mancini, Johnny Mercer) – 11:01 Bonus track on CD reissue
6. "Sophisticated Lady" (Duke Ellington, Irving Mills, Mitchell Parish) – 9:30
7. "Rhythm-a-Ning/The Theme" (Thelonious Monk/Traditional) – 10:31

== Personnel ==
- Dexter Gordon – tenor saxophone, vocals
- Joe Newman – trumpet (track 5)
- Kenny Drew – piano
- Niels-Henning Ørsted Pedersen – bass
- Alex Riel – drums
