= More Power! =

Studio album by Dexter Gordon
- Released: 1969
- Recorded: April 2 & 4, 1969; New York City
- Genre: Jazz
- Length: 39:48
- Label: Prestige; PR 7680
- Producer: Don Schlitten

Dexter Gordon chronology
The Tower of Power! (1969)	More Power! (1969)	L.T.D. (1969)

More Power! is an album by saxophonist Dexter Gordon which was recorded in 1969 and released on the Prestige label.

== Reception ==
Professional ratings
Review scores
Source	Rating
AllMusic	4/5 stars
DownBeat	4/5 stars
The Penguin Guide to Jazz Recordings	2.5/4 stars
The Rolling Stone Jazz Record Guide	4/5 stars

Lindsay Planer of AllMusic states, "Dexter Gordon's return Stateside resulted in the tenor participating in his first studio sessions in nearly a decade. Not only would his April 1969 confab with James Moody (tenor sax), Barry Harris (piano), Buster Williams (bass), and Albert 'Tootie' Heath (drums) yield this long player, but its predecessor/companion The Tower of Power! as well".

== Track listing ==
All compositions by Dexter Gordon except as indicated

1. "Lady Bird" (Tadd Dameron) / "Half Nelson" (Miles Davis) – 10:38
2. "Meditation (Meditação)" (Norman Gimbel, Antônio Carlos Jobim, Newton Mendonça) – 8:27
3. "Fried Bananas" – 6:05
4. "Boston Bernie" – 7:36
5. "Sticky Wicket" – 7:02

== Personnel ==
- Dexter Gordon – tenor saxophone
- James Moody – tenor saxophone (ensemble tracks 1 & 5)
- Barry Harris – piano
- Buster Williams – bass
- Albert Heath – drums
