= Stella by Starlight (album) =

Live album by Dexter Gordon
- Released: October 17, 2005
- Recorded: January 6, 1966
- Venue: Jazzhus Montmartre, Copenhagen, Denmark
- Genre: Jazz
- Label: SteepleChase; SCCD-36036
- Producer: Nils Winther

Dexter Gordon chronology
Setting the Pace (1965)	Stella by Starlight (2005)	The Squirrel (1967)

Professional ratings
Review scores
Source	Rating
The Penguin Guide to Jazz Recordings	3/4 stars

Stella by Starlight is a live album by American saxophonist Dexter Gordon recorded at the Jazzhus Montmartre in Copenhagen, Denmark in 1966 by Danmarks Radio and released on the SteepleChase label in 2005. The album features Gordon's quartet with saxophonist Pony Poindexter.

== Track listing ==
1. "Stella by Starlight" (Victor Young, Ned Washington) – 16:54
2. Introduction – 0:10
3. "Satin Doll" (Duke Ellington, Billy Strayhorn, Johnny Mercer) – 20:05
4. Introduction – 0:15
5. "Round About Midnight" (Thelonious Monk) – 10:33
6. Introduction – 0:17
7. "Sonnymoon for Two" [fade-out] (Sonny Rollins) – 0:37

== Personnel ==
- Dexter Gordon – tenor saxophone
- Pony Poindexter – alto saxophone, vocals
- Kenny Drew – piano
- Niels-Henning Ørsted Pedersen – bass
- Makaya Ntshoko – drums
