= The Apartment (album) =

Studio album by Dexter Gordon Quartet
- Released: 1975
- Recorded: May 24 & September 8, 1974
- Studio: Rosenberg Studio in Copenhagen, Denmark
- Genre: Jazz
- Length: 48:13 CD with bonus track
- Label: SteepleChase SCS 1025
- Producer: Nils Winther

Dexter Gordon chronology
The Source (1973)	The Apartment (1975)	Round Midnight (1974)

The Apartment is an album led by saxophonist Dexter Gordon recorded in 1974 and released on the Danish SteepleChase label.

== Reception ==
Professional ratings
Review scores
Source	Rating
AllMusic	4.5/5 stars
The Rolling Stone Jazz Record Guide	4/5 stars
The Penguin Guide to Jazz Recordings	2/4 stars

In his review for AllMusic, Scott Yanow said "While in Europe, tenor-sax-great Dexter Gordon recorded many sessions with pianist Kenny Drew, bassist Niels Pedersen and drummer Albert "Tootie" Heath. All are worth acquiring and this one is no exception".

== Track listing ==
All compositions by Dexter Gordon except where noted.

1. "The Apartment" - 5:57
2. "Wee-Dot" (J. J. Johnson) - 7:34
3. "Old Folks" (Dedette Lee Hill, Willard Robison) - 7:23
4. "Strollin'" (Horace Silver) - 7:53
5. "Candlelight Lady" - 8:52
6. "Stablemates" (Benny Golson) - 6:04 Bonus track on CD release
7. "Antabus" - 4:42

== Personnel ==
- Dexter Gordon - tenor saxophone
- Kenny Drew - piano
- Niels-Henning Ørsted Pedersen - bass
- Albert Heath - drums
