= Both Sides of Midnight =

Live album by Dexter Gordon
- Released: 1988
- Recorded: July 20, 1967
- Venue: Jazzhus Montmartre, Copenhagen, Denmark
- Genre: Jazz
- Length: 53:14
- Label: Black Lion; BLP 60103
- Producer: Alan Bates

Dexter Gordon chronology
The Squirrel (1967)	Both Sides of Midnight (1988)	Body and Soul (1967)

The Montmartre Collection Vol. 1 cover

Both Sides of Midnight is a live album by American saxophonist Dexter Gordon recorded at the Jazzhus Montmartre in Copenhagen, Denmark in 1967. It was released on the Black Lion label as The Montmartre Collection Vol. 1, then re-released with an additional track and different title in 1988 to capitalize on the success of the film Round Midnight.

== Critical reception ==
Professional ratings
Review scores
Source	Rating
AllMusic	4/5 stars

AllMusic critic Michael G. Nastos stated "A well-recorded live date, one of many Gordon did at the Montmartre, this easily ranks as one of Gordon's best, just shy of his magnum opus Homecoming".

== Track listing ==
1. "Devilette" (Ben Tucker) – 12:37
2. "For All We Know" (J. Fred Coots, Sam M. Lewis) – 8:38
3. "Doxy" (Sonny Rollins) – 7:08
4. "Sonnymoon for Two" (Rollins) – 15:39
5. "Misty" (Erroll Garner) – 9:12 Bonus track on 1988 release

== Personnel ==
- Dexter Gordon – tenor saxophone
- Kenny Drew – piano
- Niels-Henning Ørsted Pedersen – bass
- Albert Heath – drums
