= A Day in Copenhagen =

Studio album by Dexter Gordon with Slide Hampton
- Released: 1969
- Recorded: March 10, 1969; Metronome Studio, Copenhagen, Denmark
- Genre: Jazz
- Length: 41:45
- Label: MPS; MPS 15230; Prestige; PR 7763

Dexter Gordon chronology
Live at the Amsterdam Paradiso (1969)	A Day in Copenhagen (1969)	The Tower of Power! (1969)

Slide Hampton chronology
The Fabulous Slide Hampton Quartet (1969)	A Day in Copenhagen (1969)	Umeå Big Band & Slide Hampton in Montreux (1971)

Professional ratings
Review scores
Source	Rating
Allmusic	3/5 stars
DownBeat	3.5/5 stars

A Day in Copenhagen is an album by saxophonist Dexter Gordon with trombonist Slide Hampton recorded in Copenhagen in 1969 which was originally released on the MPS label in Europe and re-released on the Prestige label in the US.

== Reception ==
Scott Yanow of Allmusic states: "Unlike many other American expatriates living in Europe, tenor saxophonist Dexter Gordon always managed to play and record with the top musicians while overseas... The other soloists are fine but Gordon easily dominates the set, playing his brand of hard-driving bop".

== Track listing ==
All compositions by Slide Hampton except as indicated

1. "My Blues" - 9:11
2. "You Don't Know What Love Is" (Gene de Paul, Don Raye) - 6:03
3. "A New Thing" - 5:07
4. "What's New?" (Bob Haggart) - 8:04
5. "The Shadow of Your Smile" (Johnny Mandel, Paul Francis Webster) - 5:01
6. "A Day in Vienna" - 7:49

== Personnel ==
- Dexter Gordon - tenor saxophone
- Slide Hampton - trombone (tracks 1–4 & 6)
- Dizzy Reece - trumpet (tracks 1–4 & 6)
- Kenny Drew - piano
- Niels-Henning Ørsted Pedersen - bass
- Art Taylor - drums
