= Body and Soul (Dexter Gordon album) =

Live album by Dexter Gordon
- Released: 1988
- Recorded: July 20, 1967
- Venue: Jazzhus Montmartre, Copenhagen, Denmark
- Genre: Jazz
- Length: 59:10
- Label: Black Lion; BLP 60118
- Producer: Alan Bates

Dexter Gordon chronology
| Both Sides of Midnight (1967) | Body and Soul (1988) | Take the "A" Train (1967) |

Blues Walk! The Montmatre Collection Vol. II cover

Body and Soul is a live album by American saxophonist Dexter Gordon recorded at the Jazzhus Montmartre in Copenhagen, Denmark in 1967.

The album had first been released on the Black Lion label in 1974 as Blues Walk! The Montmatre Collection Vol. II with only four tracks (i.e. without "Come Rain or Come Shine").

== Critical reception ==
Professional ratings
Review scores
| Source | Rating |
|---|---|
| AllMusic | 4/5 stars |
| The Penguin Guide to Jazz Recordings | 3/4 stars |

AllMusic critic Michael G. Nastos stated "This set is recommended along with the two other CDs from this well-documented engagement".

== Track listing ==
1. "Like Someone in Love" (Jimmy Van Heusen, Johnny Burke) – 12:38
2. "Come Rain or Come Shine" (Harold Arlen, Johnny Mercer) – 11:04
3. "There Will Never Be Another You" (Harry Warren, Mack Gordon) – 12:29
4. "Body and Soul" (Johnny Green, Frank Eyton, Edward Heyman, Robert Sour) – 9:34
5. "Blues Walk" (Lou Donaldson) – 13:25

== Personnel ==
- Dexter Gordon – tenor saxophone
- Kenny Drew – piano
- Niels-Henning Ørsted Pedersen – bass
- Albert Heath – drums
