= One Flight Up =

Studio album by Dexter Gordon
- Released: Mid September 1965
- Recorded: June 2, 1964; CBS Studios, Paris
- Genre: Jazz
- Length: 37:05 original LP; 48:07 CD reissue
- Label: Blue Note; BLP 4176
- Producer: Francis Wolff

Dexter Gordon chronology
A Swingin' Affair (1964)	One Flight Up (1965)	Gettin' Around (1966)

One Flight Up is an album by American jazz saxophonist Dexter Gordon recorded on June 2, 1964, in Paris and released on Blue Note the following year. The session featured Donald Byrd on trumpet, pianist Kenny Drew, bassist Niels-Henning Ørsted Pedersen, and drummer Art Taylor.

== Reception ==
The AllMusic review by Michael G. Nastos awarded the album 3½ stars stating "One Flight Up stands as a testament to Dexter Gordon's viability as a bandleader and teammate, while his individualism is somewhat sublimated. It's a good listen to digest all the way through, especially if you are as patient as the performers, who have a lot to say".

Professional ratings
Review scores
Source	Rating
Allmusic	3.5/5 stars
Down Beat	4/5 stars
The Rolling Stone Jazz Record Guide	4/5 stars
The Penguin Guide to Jazz Recordings	3/4 stars

The LondonJazzCollector remarks upon Gordon's role in encouraging young talent and seasoned pros alike to stretch themselves, stating "it’s great to find [Gordon] give lots of space to the other players, particularly in the Byrd-penned “Tanya” which occupies all of side one. Dexter is quietly restrained, Byrd plays to Hubbard, Drew plays to Pearson and Hancock, Taylor mixes Blakey with a touch of Williams, and NHOP [Pedersen] walks dreamlike through the 18 minute space."

== Track listing ==
=== Original release ===
Side one
No.	Title	Writer(s)	Length
1.	"Tanya"	Donald Byrd	18:18
Total length:			18:18

Side two
No.	Title	Writer(s)	Length
1.	"Coppin' the Haven"	Kenny Drew	11:17
2.	"Darn That Dream"	Eddie DeLange; Jimmy Van Heusen	7:30
Total length:			18:47 37:05

=== CD reissue ===
All tracks are written by Dexter Gordon except as indicated.

No.	Title	Writer(s)	Length
1.	"Tanya"	Byrd	18:18
2.	"Coppin' the Haven"	Drew	11:17
3.	"Darn That Dream"	DeLange; Van Heusen	7:30
4.	"Kong Neptune (Bonus track on CD reissue)"		11:02
Total length:			48:07

== Personnel ==
- Dexter Gordon – tenor saxophone
- Donald Byrd – trumpet (tracks 1 & 2)
- Kenny Drew – piano
- Niels-Henning Ørsted Pedersen – bass
- Art Taylor – drums
