= More Than You Know (Dexter Gordon album) =

Studio album by Dexter Gordon & Orchestra
- Released: 1975
- Recorded: February 21–23, 1975 and March 27, 1975
- Studio: Rosenberg Studio, Copenhagen, Denmark
- Genre: Jazz
- Length: 55:20 CD with bonus track
- Label: SteepleChase SCS 1030
- Producer: Nils Winther

Dexter Gordon chronology
| The Rainbow People (1975) | More Than You Know (1975) | Strings and Things (1975) |

More Than You Know is an album by saxophonist Dexter Gordon with an Orchestra arranged and conducted by Palle Mikkelborg recorded in 1975 and released on the Danish SteepleChase label.

== Reception ==
Professional ratings
Review scores
| Source | Rating |
|---|---|
| AllMusic | 4/5 stars |
| The Penguin Guide to Jazz Recordings | 4/4 stars |

In his review for AllMusic, Scott Yanow said "This set does not quite live up to its potential although Dexter Gordon fans will still find moments to enjoy".

== Track listing ==
All compositions by Dexter Gordon except where noted.

1. "Naima" (John Coltrane) – 6:45
2. "Good Morning Sun" (Palle Mikkelborg) – 11:38
3. "The Girl With the Purple Eyes" – 5:59
4. "This Happy Madness" (Antônio Carlos Jobim, Vinícius de Moraes) – 6:33 Bonus track on CD release
5. "Ernie's Tune" – 9:47
6. "Tivoli" – 7:03
7. "More Than You Know" (Vincent Youmans, Edward Eliscu, Billy Rose) – 7:35

== Personnel ==
- Dexter Gordon – tenor saxophone, soprano saxophone, vocals
- Allan Botschinsky (tracks 1, 2 & 4–7), Benny Rosenfeld (tracks 1, 2 & 4–7), Idrees Sulieman – trumpet
- Richard Boone (tracks 1, 2 & 4–7), Vincent Nilsson – trombone
- Axel Windfeld – bass trombone (tracks 1, 2 & 4–7)
- Preben Garnov – French horn (tracks 1, 2 & 4–7)
- Bent Larsen – alto saxophone, bass flute (tracks 1, 2 & 4–7)
- Erwin Jacobsen – English horn, oboe (tracks 1, 2 & 4–7)
- Age Knudsen, Mogens Holm Larsen, Per Walther – violin (tracks 1, 2 & 4–7)
- Bjarne Boie Rasmussen – viola (tracks 1, 2 & 4–7)
- Erling Christensen – cello (tracks 1, 2 & 4–7)
- Luba Boschenko – harp (tracks 1, 2 & 4–7)
- Thomas Clausen – piano, electric piano
- Kenneth Knudsen – synthesizer
- Ole Molin – guitar
- Niels-Henning Ørsted Pedersen – bass
- Alex Riel (track 3), Ed Thigpen (tracks 1, 2 & 4–7) – drums
- Klaus Nordsoe – congas, percussion
- Sanne Salomonsen – vocals (track 2)
- Palle Mikkelborg – arranger, conductor, trumpet, vocals
