= Some Other Spring =

Some Other Spring Blues And Ballads

Studio album by Karin Krog with Dexter Gordon
- Released: 1970
- Recorded: May 10, 1970; Oslo, Norway
- Genre: Jazz
- Length: 61:54
- Label: Sonet; SLP 1407
- Producer: Hallvard Kvale and Johs Berg

Dexter Gordon chronology
| XXL (1969) | Some Other Spring Blues And Ballads (1970) | Dexter Gordon with Junior Mance at Montreux (1970) |

Karin Krog chronology
| Joy (1968) | Some Other Spring Blues And Ballads (1970) | George Gershwin + Karin Krog (1974) |

Professional ratings
Review scores
| Source | Rating |
|---|---|
| Allmusic | 4.5/5 stars |
| The Penguin Guide to Jazz Recordings | 3.5/4 stars |

Some Other Spring Blues And Ballads is an album by Norwegian vocalist Karin Krog with American saxophonist Dexter Gordon recorded in Norway in 1970 and originally released on the Sonet label in Europe.

== Reception ==
The Allmusic review stated: "This is one of the most accessible Karin Krog releases around and is recommended".

== Track listing ==
1. "Some Other Spring" (Arthur Herzog, Jr., Irene Kitchings) – 5:00
2. "Blue Monk" (Abbey Lincoln, Thelonious Monk) – 3:55
3. "How Insensitive" (Antônio Carlos Jobim, Norman Gimbel) – 4:30
4. "Blue Eyes" (Berndt Egerbladh, Karin Krog) – 4:50
5. "Jelly, Jelly" (Billy Eckstein, Earl Hines) – 4:55
6. "I Wish I Knew" (Harry Warren, Mack Gordon) – 5:25
7. "Everybody's Somebody's Fool" (Ace Adams, Lionel Hampton) – 4:35
8. "Shiny Stockings" (Frank Foster, Ella Fitzgerald) – 3:40

== Personnel ==
- Karin Krog – vocals
- Dexter Gordon – tenor saxophone, vocals
- Kenny Drew – piano
- Niels-Henning Ørsted Pedersen – bass
- Espen Rud – drums
