= Swiss Nights Vol. 1 =

Live album by Dexter Gordon Quartet
- Released: 1976
- Recorded: 23–24 August 1975 at the Zürich Jazz Festival in Zürich, Switzerland
- Genre: Jazz
- Length: 66:55 CD with bonus tracks
- Label: SteepleChase SCS 1050
- Producer: Nils Winther

Dexter Gordon chronology
Stable Mable (1975)	Swiss Nights Vol. 1 (1976)	Swiss Nights Vol. 2 (1975)

Swiss Nights Vol. 1 is a live album led by saxophonist Dexter Gordon recorded in Zürich in 1975 and released on the Danish SteepleChase label.

== Reception ==
Professional ratings
Review scores
Source	Rating
AllMusic	4.5/5 stars
The Rolling Stone Jazz Record Guide	4/5 stars
The Penguin Guide to Jazz Recordings	3/4 stars

In his review for AllMusic, Scott Yanow said "All of the performances are at least ten minutes long and there are some rambling moments, but in general, the music is quite rewarding. This was one of Dexter Gordon's prime periods".

== Track listing ==
1. "Tenor Madness" (Sonny Rollins) - 10:39
2. "Wave" (Antônio Carlos Jobim) - 10:39
3. "You've Changed" (Bill Carey, Carl T. Fischer) - 9:59
4. "Days of Wine and Roses" (Henry Mancini, Johnny Mercer) - 12:28
5. "The Panther" (Dexter Gordon) - 13:17 Bonus track on CD reissue
6. "Montmartre/The Theme" (Dexter Gordon/Traditional) - 9:53 Bonus track on CD reissue

== Personnel ==
- Dexter Gordon - tenor saxophone
- Kenny Drew - piano
- Niels-Henning Ørsted Pedersen - bass
- Alex Riel - drums
