= Something Different (Dexter Gordon album) =

Studio album by Dexter Gordon Quartet
- Released: 1980
- Recorded: September 13, 1975 in Copenhagen, Denmark
- Genre: Jazz
- Length: 66:51 CD with bonus tracks
- Label: SteepleChase SCS 1136
- Producer: Nils Winther

Dexter Gordon chronology
Swiss Nights Vol. 3 (1975)	Something Different (1980)	Bouncin' with Dex (1975)

Something Different is an album led by saxophonist Dexter Gordon, recorded in 1975 and released on the Danish SteepleChase label in 1980.

== Reception ==
Professional ratings
Review scores
Source	Rating
AllMusic	4.5/5 stars
The Penguin Guide to Jazz Recordings	3/4 stars
The Rolling Stone Jazz Record Guide	5/5 stars
DownBeat	5/5 stars

In his review for AllMusic, Scott Yanow wrote that "the music is at the same high quality level and in the same modern bop genre as one would expect".

== Track listing ==
1. "Freddie Freeloader" (Miles Davis) - 8:33
2. "When Sunny Gets Blue" (Jack Segal, Marvin Fisher) - 6:08
3. "Invitation" (Bronisław Kaper) - 9:13
4. "Freddie Freeloader" [Take 3] (Davis) - 7:48 Bonus track on CD reissue
5. "Yesterday's Mood" [Take 4] (Slide Hampton) - 8:03 Bonus track on CD reissue
6. "Winther's Calling" (Dexter Gordon) - 9:55
7. "Polkadots and Moonbeams" - (Jimmy Van Heusen, Johnny Burke) - 9:03
8. "Yesterday's Mood" (Hampton) - 8:08

== Personnel ==
- Dexter Gordon – tenor saxophone
- Philip Catherine – guitar
- Niels-Henning Ørsted Pedersen – bass
- Billy Higgins – drums
