= Swiss Nights Vol. 2 =

Live album by Dexter Gordon Quartet
- Released: 1978
- Recorded: August 23 & 24, 1975 at the Zurich Jazz Festival in Zurich, Switzerland
- Genre: Jazz
- Length: 62:01 CD with bonus tracks
- Label: SteepleChase SCS 1090
- Producer: Nils Winther

Dexter Gordon chronology
Swiss Nights Vol. 1 (1975)	Swiss Nights Vol. 2 (1978)	Swiss Nights Vol. 3 (1975)

Swiss Nights Vol. 2 is a live album led by saxophonist Dexter Gordon recorded in Zurich in 1975 and released on the Danish SteepleChase label in 1978.

== Reception ==
Professional ratings
Review scores
Source	Rating
AllMusic	4/5 stars
The Penguin Guide to Jazz Recordings	3/4 stars

In his review for AllMusic, Scott Yanow said "The second of three CDs taken from Gordon's appearances at the 1975 Montreux Jazz Festival showcases the veteran tenor in peak form. With strong support from the talented rhythm section ... Dexter Gordon is heard throughout at his best".

== Track listing ==
1. "There Is No Greater Love" (Isham Jones, Marty Symes) - 15:08
2. "Sticky Wicket" (Dexter Gordon) - 5:33
3. "Wave" (Antônio Carlos Jobim) - 10:59 Bonus track on CD reissue
4. "Rhythm-a-Ning/The Theme" (Thelonious Monk/Traditional) - 11:41 Bonus track on CD reissue
5. "Darn That Dream" (Eddie DeLange, Jimmy Van Heusen) - 9:47
6. "Montmartre/The Theme" (Dexter Gordon/Traditional) - 9:36

== Personnel ==
- Dexter Gordon - tenor saxophone
- Kenny Drew - piano
- Niels-Henning Ørsted Pedersen - bass
- Alex Riel - drums
