= Sophisticated Ladies (Sweet Substitute album) =

Studio album by Sweet Substitute
- Released: 1981
- Genre: Jazz/Swing
- Label: Black Lion Records
- Producer: Alan Bates

Sweet Substitute chronology
Something Special (1977)	Sophisticated Ladies (1981)

Sophisticated Ladies (also issued as “Sweet Substitute”) is an album by the English jazz/swing all girl singing trio Sweet Substitute released in 1981 on the Black Lion Records label. At the time the trio consisted of Angie Masterton, Teri Leggett and Kate McNab. “Take Me to the Mardi Gras” and “Do You Know What it Means (To Miss New Orleans)” were recorded with Chris Barber’s band and Dear Mr. Berkeley with the Digby Fairweather Friends. "Take Me to the Mardi Gras" was issued as a 7" single in the UK and Germany in 1980.

== Track listing ==
Side 1

1. "Lullaby of Broadway" (Harry Warren) – 2:43
2. "Sophisticated Lady" (Duke Ellington) – 4:14
3. "Tiger Blues" (Andy Leggett) – 4:09
4. "Sleepy Suzy" (Andy Leggett) – 2:23
5. "Take Me to the Mardi Gras" (Paul Simon) – 3:32

Side 2

1. "I Got an Uncle in Harlem" (Oran “Hot Lips” Page) – 3:11
2. "Good Morning Heartache" (Irene Higginbotham/Ervin Drake/Dan Fisher) – 3:22
3. "Dear Mr. Berkeley" (Andy Leggett) – 2:34
4. "Sweet Misery" Unaccompanied Voices (Hoyt Axton) – 2:46
5. "Do You Know What it Means (To Miss New Orleans)" (Alter/de Lange) – 4:05
6. "Satin Doll" (Duke Ellington) – 2:34

== Musicians ==
- Trumpets: Kenny Baker, Bert Ezzard, Eddie Blair, Digby Fairweather, Pat Halcox, Chris Barber
- Trombones: Pete Strange, Billy Lamb, Jack Thirwell, Chris Barber
- Saxophones: Randy Colville, Bill Skeat, Danny Moss, Henry Mackenzie, Bernie George, Danny Moss, John Crocker, Andy Leggett
- Guitars: Denny Wright, Andy Leggett, Johnny McCallum, Roger Hill
- Piano: Barney Bates, Peter Wingfield
- Bass: Len Skeat, Harvey Weston, Vic Pitt
- Drums: Stan Bourke, Norman Emberson
- Reeds: Ian Wheeler, John Crocker
- Cornet: Digby Fairweather
- Clarinet: Randy Colville

== Production ==
- Produced by: Alan Bates
- Arrangers: Alyn Ainsworth, Andy Leggett,Digby Fairweather & Pete Strange
- Recorded and re-mixed at: R. G. Jones Studios, Wimbledon, England
- Recording Engineer: Gerry Kitchingham
