= Bouncin' with Dex =

Studio album by Dexter Gordon Quartet
- Released: 1976
- Recorded: September 14, 1975 in Copenhagen, Denmark
- Genre: Jazz
- Length: 46:45 CD with bonus track
- Label: SteepleChase SCS 1060
- Producer: Nils Winther

Dexter Gordon chronology
Something Different (1975)	Bouncin' with Dex (1976)	Lullaby for a Monster (1976)

Bouncin' with Dex is an album led by saxophonist Dexter Gordon recorded in 1975 and released on the Danish SteepleChase label.

== Reception ==
Professional ratings
Review scores
Source	Rating
AllMusic	4/5 stars

In his review for AllMusic, Ken Dryden said "Dexter Gordon thrived on the attention of European jazz fans while living there during the 1960s and early '70s, while he also had a wealth of opportunities to record for labels on the continent. This 1975 session for Steeplechase, one of a dozen he made as a leader for the label in the mid-'70s, finds him in top form".

== Track listing ==
1. "Billie's Bounce" (Charlie Parker) – 8:01
2. "Easy Living" (Ralph Rainger, Leo Robin) – 5:28
3. "Benji's Bounce" (Dexter Gordon) – 7:06
4. "Catalonian Nights" (Gordon) – 8:38
5. "Four" (Eddie "Cleanhead" Vinson) – 9:30
6. "Easy Living" [Alternate Take] (Rainger, Robin) – 8:02 Bonus track on CD reissue

== Personnel ==
- Dexter Gordon – tenor saxophone
- Tete Montoliu – piano
- Niels-Henning Ørsted Pedersen – bass
- Billy Higgins – drums
