= Lullaby for a Monster =

Studio album by Dexter Gordon Trio
- Released: 1981
- Recorded: June 15, 1976 in Copenhagen, Denmark
- Genre: Jazz
- Length: 46:50 CD with bonus track
- Label: SteepleChase SCS 1156
- Producer: Nils Winther

Dexter Gordon chronology
Bouncin' with Dex (1975)	Lullaby for a Monster (1981)	True Blue (1976)

Lullaby for a Monster is an album led by saxophonist Dexter Gordon, recorded in 1976 and released on the Danish SteepleChase label in 1981.

== Reception ==
Professional ratings
Review scores
Source	Rating
AllMusic	4/5 stars
The Penguin Guide to Jazz Recordings	2.5/4 stars
The Rolling Stone Jazz Record Guide	5/5 stars

In his review for AllMusic, Scott Yanow said that "this Dexter Gordon album features him in a surprisingly sparse setting. ...he is up to the challenge and his lengthy solos never lose one's interest".

== Track listing ==
1. "Nursery Blues" (Dexter Gordon) - 6:02
2. "Lullaby for a Monster" (Niels-Henning Ørsted Pedersen) - 6:32
3. "On Green Dolphin Street" (Bronisław Kaper, Ned Washington) - 6:39
4. "Good Bait" (Tadd Dameron) - 8:29 Bonus track on CD reissue
5. "Born to Be Blue" (Mel Tormé, Robert Wells) - 8:14
6. "Tanya" (Donald Byrd) - 10:24

== Personnel ==
- Dexter Gordon - tenor saxophone
- Niels-Henning Ørsted Pedersen - bass
- Alex Riel - drums
