= Dexter Gordon =

American jazz saxophonist (1923–1990)

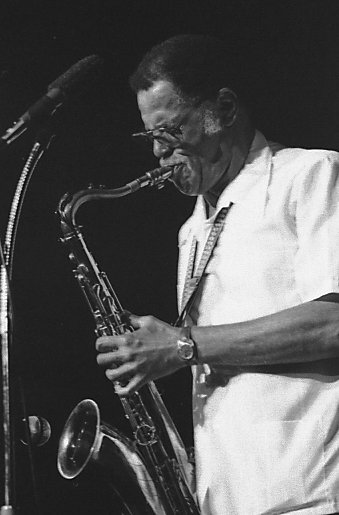
- Gordon in concert in Toronto on August 19, 1978

Background information
- Also known as: Long Tall Dexter; Sophisticated Giant
- Born: Dexter Keith Gordon; February 27, 1923; Los Angeles, California, U.S.
- Died: April 25, 1990 (aged 67) Philadelphia, Pennsylvania, U.S.
- Genres: Jazz; swing; bebop; hard bop
- Occupations: Musician; composer; bandleader
- Instruments: Tenor saxophone; soprano saxophone
- Years active: 1940–1986
- Labels: Blue Note; Savoy; Columbia
- Website: dextergordon.com

Dexter Gordon (February 27, 1923 – April 25, 1990) was an American jazz tenor saxophonist, composer, bandleader and actor. He was among the most influential early bebop musicians. Gordon's height was 6 feet 6 inches (198 cm), thus he was also known as "Long Tall Dexter" and "Sophisticated Giant". His studio and performance career spanned more than 40 years.

Gordon's sound was commonly characterized as being "large" and spacious, and he had a tendency to play behind the beat. He inserted musical quotations into his solos, with sources as diverse as "Happy Birthday" and well-known melodies from the operas of Wagner. Quoting from various musical sources is not unusual in jazz improvisation, but Gordon did it frequently enough to make it a hallmark of his style. One of his major influences was Lester Young. Gordon, in turn, was an early influence on John Coltrane and Sonny Rollins. Rollins and Coltrane then influenced Gordon's playing as he explored hard bop and modal playing during the 1960s.

Gordon had a genial and humorous stage presence. He was an advocate of playing to communicate with the audience, which was his musical approach as well. One of his idiosyncratic rituals was to recite lyrics from each ballad before playing it. In an interview, pianist Dave Bass recalled, "Dexter would get up to the microphone, holding his horn horizontally, and he'd say 'You must remember this, a kiss is still a kiss, a sigh is just a sigh.' It was a little bit of a shtick, but it was how he approached a song, and I remember that."

A photograph by Herman Leonard of Gordon taking a smoke break at the Royal Roost in 1948 is one of the iconic images in jazz photography. Cigarettes were a recurring theme on covers of Gordon's albums.

Gordon was nominated for the Academy Award for Best Actor for his performance in the Bertrand Tavernier film Round Midnight (Warner Bros., 1986), becoming the first Jazz musician to do so. He won the Grammy Award for Best Jazz Performance for the soundtrack album The Other Side of Round Midnight (Blue Note Records, 1986). He also had a cameo role in the 1990 film Awakenings. In 2018, Gordon's album Go (Blue Note, 1962) was selected by the Library of Congress for preservation in the National Recording Registry for being "culturally, historically, or aesthetically significant".

== Early life and education ==
Dexter Keith Gordon was born on February 27, 1923, in Los Angeles, California. His father, Frank Alexander Gordon, one of the first African-American medical doctors in Los Angeles, arrived there in 1918 after graduating from Howard University Medical School in Washington, D.C. Among his patients were Duke Ellington and Lionel Hampton. Dexter's mother, Gwendolyn Baker Gordon, was the daughter of Captain Edward Lee Baker Jr. one of the five African-American Medal of Honor recipients in the Spanish–American War. Dexter always had a remarkable respect for both of his parents, and admired the achievements of both as they raised him. Unfortunately, his father passed away suddenly of a heart attack when Dexter was only twelve, leaving Dexter without a crucial male figure during a very developmental time in his life. Dexter stated on more than one occasion that "he has never truly recovered from that terrible personal tragedy, and there have been many times when he has wished his father were still alive."

Gordon began his study of music with the clarinet at the age of 13, then switched to the alto saxophone at 15, and finally to the tenor saxophone at 17. He studied with multi-instrumentalist Lloyd Reese while attending Thomas Jefferson High School, and also with the school's band director, Sam Browne. While still at school, he played in bands with such contemporaries as Chico Hamilton and Buddy Collette.

In 1942, Gordon was drafted into the U.S. Army following America's entry in the Second World War. He was assigned to the Signal Corps for two years and was stationed in North Africa, where he served as a radio operator and played trumpet in a military band. Between December 1940 and 1943, Gordon was a member of Lionel Hampton's band, playing in a saxophone section alongside Illinois Jacquet and Marshal Royal. During 1944, Gordon was featured in the Fletcher Henderson band, followed by the Louis Armstrong band, before joining Billy Eckstine. The 1942–1944 musicians' strike curtailed the recording of the Hampton, Henderson, and Armstrong bands; however, they were recorded on V-Discs produced by the Army for broadcast and distribution among overseas troops. In 1943, he was featured, alongside Harry "Sweets" Edison, in recordings under Nat King Cole for a small label not affected by the strike.

== Career ==
=== Bebop-era recordings ===
By late 1944, Gordon was residing in New York, a regular at bebop jam sessions and a featured soloist in the big band of Billy Eckstine ("If That's the Way You Feel", "I Want to Talk About You", "Blowin' the Blues Away", "Opus X", "I'll Wait and Pray", "The Real Thing Happened to Me", "Lonesome Lover Blues", "I Love the Rhythm in a Riff"). During early 1945, he was featured on recordings by Dizzy Gillespie ("Blue 'n' Boogie", "Groovin' High") and Charles Thompson ("Takin' Off", "If I Had You", "20th Century Blues", "The Street Beat"). In late 1945, Gordon was recording under his own name for the Savoy label. His Savoy recordings during 1945–46 included Blow Mr. Dexter, Dexter's Deck, Dexter's Minor Mad, Long Tall Dexter, Dexter Rides Again, I Can't Escape From You, and Dexter Digs In.

He returned to Los Angeles in late 1946, and in 1947 was leading sessions for Ross Russell's Dial label (Mischievous Lady, Lullaby in Rhythm, The Chase, Iridescence, It's the Talk of the Town, Bikini, A Ghost of a Chance, Sweet and Lovely). After his return to Los Angeles, he became known for his saxophone duels with fellow tenorman Wardell Gray, which were a popular concert attraction documented in recordings made between 1947 and 1952 (The Hunt, Move, The Chase, The Steeplechase). The Hunt gained literary fame from its mention in Jack Kerouac's On the Road, which also contains descriptions of wild tenormen jamming in Los Angeles. Cherokee, Byas a Drink and Disorder at the Border are other live recordings of the Gray–Gordon duo from the same concert (all issued on the album The Hunt in 1977; all four reissued on the 3-CD set Bopland in 2004). In December 1947, Gordon recorded again for the Savoy label (Settin' the Pace, So Easy, Dexter's Riff, Dextrose, Dexter's Mood, Index, Dextivity, Wee Dot, Lion Roars). Through the mid-to-late 1940s, he continued to work as a sideman on sessions led by Russell Jacquet, Benny Carter, Ben Webster, Ralph Burns, Jimmy Rushing, Helen Humes, Gerry Mulligan, Wynonie Harris, Leo Parker, and Tadd Dameron.

=== The 1950s ===
During the 1950s, Gordon's recording output and live appearances declined as heroin addiction and legal troubles took their toll. Gordon made a concert appearance with Wardell Gray in February 1952 (The Chase, The Steeplechase, Take the A Train, Robbins Nest, Stardust) and appeared as a sideman in a session led by Gray in June 1952 (The Rubiyat, Jungle Jungle Jump, Citizen's Bop, My Kinda Love). After incarceration at Chino Prison, from 1953 to 1955, he recorded the albums Daddy Plays the Horn and Dexter Blows Hot and Cool in 1955 and played as a sideman on the Stan Levey album This Time the Drum's on Me. The latter part of the decade saw him in and out of prison until his final release from Folsom Prison in 1959. He was one of the initial saxophone players for the Onzy Matthews big band in 1959, along with Curtis Amy. Gordon continued to champion Matthews's band after he left Los Angeles for New York, but left for Europe before getting a chance to record with that band. He recorded The Resurgence of Dexter Gordon in 1960. His recordings from the mid-1950s onward document a meander into a smooth, West Coast style that lacked the impact of his bebop-era recordings or his subsequent Blue Note recordings.

The decade saw Gordon's first entry into the world of drama. He appeared as a member (uncredited) of Art Hazzard's band in the film Young Man with a Horn (1950). He appeared in an uncredited and overdubbed role as a member of a prison band in the movie Unchained, filmed inside Chino. Gordon was a saxophonist performing Freddie Redd's music for the Los Angeles production of Jack Gelber's play The Connection in 1960, replacing Jackie McLean. He contributed two compositions, Ernie's Tune and I Want More to the score and later recorded them for his album Dexter Calling..., in 1962.

=== New York renaissance ===
Gordon signed to Blue Note in 1961. He initially commuted from Los Angeles to New York to record, but took up residence when he regained the cabaret card that allowed him to perform where alcohol was served. The Jazz Gallery hosted his first New York performance in twelve years. The Blue Note association was to produce a steady flow of albums for several years, some of which gained iconic status. His New York renaissance was marked by Doin' Allright, Dexter Calling..., Go!, and A Swingin' Affair. The first two were recorded over three days in May 1961, with Freddie Hubbard, Horace Parlan, Kenny Drew, Paul Chambers, George Tucker, Al Harewood, and Philly Joe Jones. The last two were recorded in August 1962, with a rhythm section that featured Blue Note regulars Sonny Clark, Butch Warren, and Billy Higgins. Of the two, Go! was an expressed favorite. The albums showed his assimilation of the hard bop and modal styles that had developed during his years on the west coast, and the influence of John Coltrane and Sonny Rollins, whom he had influenced before. The stay in New York turned out to be short-lived, as Gordon got offers for engagements in England, then Europe, that resulted in a fourteen-year stay. Soon after recording A Swingin' Affair, he left the United States.

=== Years in Europe ===
Over the next 14 years in Europe, living mainly in Paris and Copenhagen, Gordon played regularly with fellow expatriates or visiting players, such as Bud Powell, Ben Webster, Freddie Hubbard, Bobby Hutcherson, Kenny Drew, Horace Parlan, and Billy Higgins. Blue Note's Francis Wolff supervised Gordon's later sessions for the label on his visits to Europe. The pairing of Gordon with Drew turned out to be one of the classic matchups between a horn player and a pianist, much like Miles Davis with Red Garland or John Coltrane with McCoy Tyner.

From this period came Our Man in Paris, One Flight Up, Gettin' Around, and Clubhouse. Our Man in Paris was a Blue Note session recorded in Paris in 1963 with backup consisting of pianist Powell, drummer Kenny Clarke, and French bassist Pierre Michelot. One Flight Up, recorded in Paris in 1964 with trumpeter Donald Byrd, pianist Kenny Drew, drummer Art Taylor, and Danish bassist Niels-Henning Ørsted Pedersen, features an extended solo by Gordon on the track "Tanya".

Gordon also visited the U.S. occasionally for further recording dates. Gettin' Around was recorded for Blue Note during a visit in May 1965, as was the album Clubhouse, which remained unreleased until 1979.

Gordon found Europe in the 1960s a much easier place to live, saying that he experienced less racism and greater respect for jazz musicians. He also stated that on his visits to the U.S. in the late 1960s and early 1970s, he found the political and social strife disturbing. While in Copenhagen, Gordon and Drew's trio appeared onscreen in Ole Ege's theatrically released hardcore pornographic film Pornografi – en musical (1971), for which they composed and performed the score.

He switched from Blue Note to Prestige Records for 1965–73. With the label, he recorded bop albums like The Tower of Power! and More Power! (1969) with James Moody, Barry Harris, Buster Williams, and Albert "Tootie" Heath; The Panther! (1970) with Tommy Flanagan, Larry Ridley, and Alan Dawson; The Jumpin' Blues (1970) with Wynton Kelly, Sam Jones, and Roy Brooks; The Chase! (1970) with Gene Ammons, Jodie Christian, John Young, Cleveland Eaton, Rufus Reid, Wilbur Campbell, Steve McCall, and Vi Redd; and Tangerine (1972) with Thad Jones, Freddie Hubbard, and Hank Jones. Some of the Prestige albums were recorded during visits back to North America while he was still living in Europe; others were made in Europe, including live sets from the Montreux Jazz Festival.

In addition to the recordings Gordon did under his American label contracts, live recordings by European labels and live video from his European period have been released. In 1975, Gordon signed an exclusive recording contract with the Danish label SteepleChase, for which he recorded some of his most inspired sessions, including The Apartment (1974); More Than You Know (1975); Stable Mable; Swiss Nights Vol. 1, 2, and 3; Something Different; Lullaby for a Monster; and not least, Biting the Apple (1976), recorded during his homecoming trip to New York, featuring Barry Harris, Sam Jones, and Al Foster. The album received the Grand Prix De Jazz in Montreux, Switzerland, in 1977. SteepleChase released live dates from his mid-1960s tenure at the Jazzhus Montmartre in Copenhagen. The video was released in the Jazz Icons series.

=== Homecoming ===
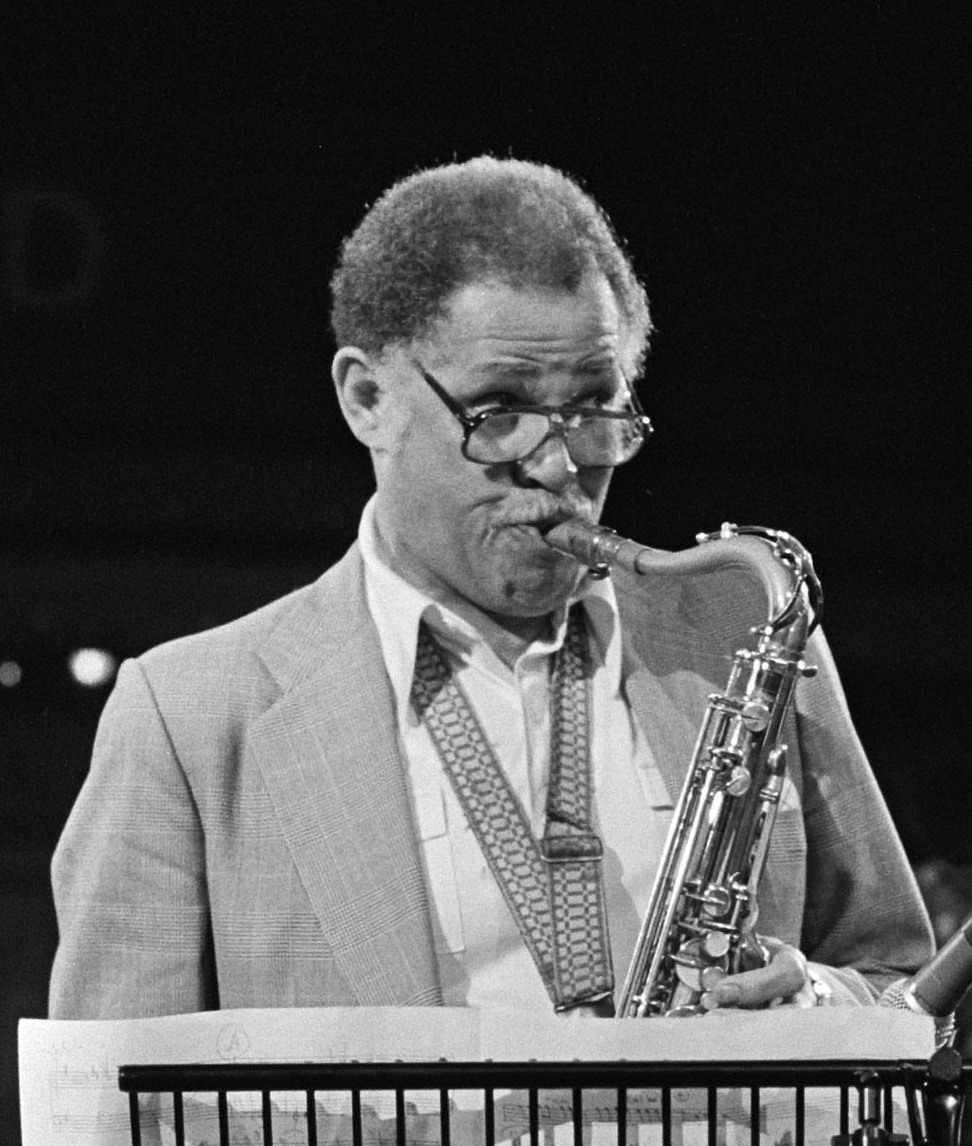
Gordon performing at the 1980 Edison Award ceremony (left) and receiving the award (right), in the company of Princess Margriet; at the Concertgebouw, Amsterdam

Gordon returned to the United States for good in 1976. He appeared with Woody Shaw, Ronnie Mathews, Stafford James, and Louis Hayes, for a gig at the Village Vanguard in New York that was dubbed his "homecoming". It was recorded and released by Columbia Records under that title. He observed, "There was so much love and elation; sometimes it was a little eerie at the Vanguard. After the last set they'd turn on the lights and nobody would move." In addition to the Homecoming album, a series of live albums was released by Blue Note from his stands at Keystone Korner in San Francisco during 1978 and 1979. They featured Gordon, George Cables, Rufus Reid, and Eddie Gladden. He recorded the studio albums Sophisticated Giant with an eleven-piece big band in 1977 and Manhattan Symphonie with the Live at Keystone Corner crew in 1978. The sensation of Gordon's return, and the continued efforts of Art Blakey through 1970s and early 1980s, have been credited with reviving interest in swinging, melodic, acoustically-based classic jazz sounds following the jazz fusion era that saw an emphasis on electronic sounds and contemporary pop influences.

=== Musician emeritus ===
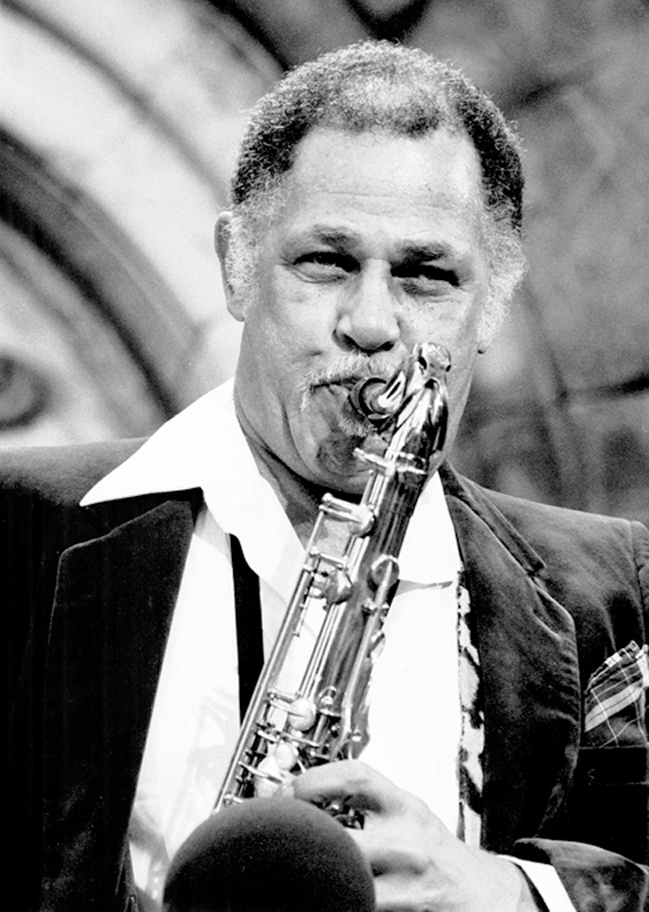
Gordon at the Mountain Winery Jazz Festival, Saratoga, California, 1981

In 1978 and 1980, Gordon was the DownBeat Musician of the Year, and in 1980, he was inducted into magazine's Jazz Hall of Fame. The U.S. Government honored him with a Congressional Commendation and a Dexter Gordon Day in Washington, D.C., and in 1986, the National Endowment for the Arts named him a NEA Jazz Master in recognition of his Lifetime Achievement. In 1986, he was named a member and officer of the French Order of Arts and Letters (Officier des Arts et Lettres) by the Ministry of Culture in France.

During the 1980s, Gordon, a life-long smoker, was weakened by emphysema. He remained a popular attraction at concerts and festivals, although his live appearances and recording dates would soon become infrequent.

Gordon starred in the 1986 movie Round Midnight as "Dale Turner", an expatriate jazz musician in Paris during the late 1950s based loosely on Lester Young and Bud Powell. That portrayal earned him a nomination for an Academy Award for Best Actor. In addition, he had a non-speaking role as a piano-playing hospital inmate in the 1990 film Awakenings, which was posthumously released. Before that last film was released, he made a guest appearance on the Michael Mann series Crime Story.

Soundtrack performances from Round Midnight were released as the albums Round Midnight and The Other Side of Round Midnight, featuring original music by Herbie Hancock as well as playing by Gordon. The latter was the last recording released under Gordon's name. He was a sideman on Tony Bennett's 1987 album Berlin.

== Death ==
Gordon died of kidney failure and smoking-related cancer of the larynx in Philadelphia, on April 25, 1990, at the age of 67.

== Family ==
Gordon's maternal grandfather was Captain Edward L. Baker Jr., who received the Medal of Honor during the Spanish–American War while serving with the 10th Cavalry Regiment (also known as the Buffalo Soldiers).

Gordon's father, Dr. Frank Gordon, M.D., was one of the first prominent African-American physicians and a graduate of Howard University.

Gordon's uncle, Clifford Myota Gordon, was a charter member of the Alpha Delta chapter of Alpha Phi Alpha fraternity, seated at the University of Southern California.

When he lived in Denmark, Gordon became friends with the family of future Metallica drummer Lars Ulrich and subsequently became Lars's godfather.

Gordon was married three times and had six children: Robin, James, Deirdre, Mikael, Morten, and Benjamin.

== Instruments and mouthpieces ==
The earliest photographs of Gordon performing show him with a Conn 30M "Connqueror" and an Otto Link mouthpiece. Later, he adopted the standard Conn tenor, the 10M. In a 1962 interview with the British journalist Les Tomkins, he did not refer to the specific model of mouthpiece but stated that it was made for him personally. He stated that it was stolen around 1952. In the Tomkins interview he referred to his mouthpiece as a small-chambered piece with a 5* (.085 inches under the Otto Link system) tip opening. He bought a Selmer Mark VI from Ben Webster after he lost his 10M during the trip to Paris. In a DownBeat magazine interview from 1977, he referred to his current mouthpiece as an Otto Link model with a #8 (.110 inches under the Otto Link system) tip opening.

== Discography ==
=== As leader ===
==== Studio albums ====
Year	Title	Label	Notes
1950	Dexter Gordon	Dial 204	10″ LP; with Melba Liston and Teddy Edwards
1951	New Sounds in Modern Music (Volume 1)	Savoy MG 9003	10″ LP
1952	New Trends of Jazz (Volume 3)	Savoy MG 9016	10″ LP
1952	Gene Norman Presents... The Chase and The Steeplechase	Decca DL 7025	10″ LP; with Wardell Gray
1956 [1955]	Daddy Plays the Horn	Bethlehem	
1956 [1955]	Dexter Blows Hot and Cool	Dootone	
1961 [1960]	The Resurgence of Dexter Gordon	Jazzland	
1961	Doin' Allright	Blue Note	with Freddie Hubbard
1962 [1961]	Dexter Calling...	Blue Note	
1962	Go!	Blue Note	
1964 [1962]	A Swingin' Affair	Blue Note	
1963	Our Man in Paris	Blue Note	with Bud Powell, Pierre Michelot and Kenny Clarke
1965 [1964]	One Flight Up	Blue Note	with Donald Byrd
1966 [1965]	Gettin' Around	Blue Note	with Bobby Hutcherson
1969	A Day in Copenhagen	MPS; Prestige	with Slide Hampton
1969	The Tower of Power!	Prestige	with James Moody
1969	More Power!	Prestige	with James Moody
1970	Some Other Spring	Sonet	with Karin Krog
1970	The Panther!	Prestige	with Tommy Flanagan, Larry Ridley and Alan Dawson
1970	The Jumpin' Blues	Prestige	with Wynton Kelly
1972	Ca'Purange	Prestige	with Thad Jones, Hank Jones, Stanley Clarke and Louis Hayes
1972	Generation	Prestige	with Freddie Hubbard and Cedar Walton
1974	The Apartment	SteepleChase	with Kenny Drew, Niels-Henning Orsted Pedersen and Albert "Tootie" Heath
1975	More Than You Know	SteepleChase	with Orchestra arranged and conducted by Palle Mikkelborg
1975	Stable Mable	SteepleChase	with Horace Parlan
1975	Something Different	SteepleChase	with Philip Catherine
1975	Bouncin' with Dex	SteepleChase	
1975	Strings & Things	SteepleChase	with Esko Linnavalli
1975 [1972]	Tangerine	Prestige	with Thad Jones, Hank Jones, Stanley Clarke and Louis Hayes
1976	True Blue	Xanadu	with Al Cohn
1976	Silver Blue	Xanadu	with Al Cohn
1977 [1976]	Biting the Apple	SteepleChase; Inner City	
1977	Sophisticated Giant	Columbia	with 11-piece big-band including Woody Shaw, Benny Bailey, Slide Hampton, Frank Wess and Bobby Hutcherson
1978	Manhattan Symphonie	Columbia	with George Cables, Rufus Reid and Eddie Gladden
1981	Gotham City	Columbia	with Woody Shaw, Cedar Walton, George Benson, Percy Heath and Art Blakey
1981 [1976]	Lullaby for a Monster	SteepleChase	
1982	American Classic	Elektra/Musician	with Grover Washington Jr., Kirk Lightsey and Shirley Scott
1986	The Other Side of Round Midnight	Blue Note	soundtrack album

==== Compilations ====
Year	Title	Label	Notes
1958 [1945–47]	Dexter Rides Again	Savoy MG 12130	
1969 [1947]	The Dial Sessions	Polydor 582 735; Storyville SLP 814	reissued as The Chase! The Complete Dial Sessions 1947 (Stash 2513, 1995)
1976 [1947]	The Chase (The Dial Masters)	Spotlite SPJ 130	with Wardell Gray and Teddy Edwards
1976 [1945–47]	Long Tall Dexter (The Savoy Sessions)	Savoy SJL 2211	2-LP
1977 [1947]	The Hunt	Savoy SJL 2222	2-LP; with Wardell Gray
1979 [1965]	Clubhouse	Blue Note	archival album
1980 [1961–62]	Landslide	Blue Note	archival album
1980 [1945–48]	Move! (The Dial Masters)	Spotlite SPJ 133	
1985 [1945–47]	Master Takes – The Savoy Recordings	Savoy SJL 1154	
1994	Dexter's Mood	Cool & Blue 114	compilation of Dial and Savoy masters
1996	The Complete Blue Note Sixties Sessions	Blue Note/EMI 72438 34200 25	6-CD
1998 [1945–47]	Settin' the Pace	Savoy 17027	includes all 15 tracks from Savoy SJL 1154, plus bonus material
2001 [1943–50]	Settin' the Pace	Proper BOX16	4-CD

==== Live albums ====
Year	Title	Label	Notes
2004 [1947]	Bopland: The Legendary Elks Club Concert L.A. 1947	Savoy 17441	3-CD; with Wardell Gray, Sonny Criss, Howard McGhee, Trummy Young; includes all 4 lengthy tracks from Savoy SJL 2221: "Disorder At The Border", "Byas-A-Drink", "The Hunt" and "Cherokee", plus a ton of bonus material
2022 [1962–63]	Soul Sister	SteepleChase	
1978 [1962–64]	Cry Me a River (Live at Montmartre Jazzhus)	SteepleChase	
1979 [1964]	Cheese Cake (Live at Montmartre Jazzhus)	SteepleChase	with Tete Montoliu
1979 [1964]	King Neptune (Live at Montmartre Jazzhus)	SteepleChase	
1980 [1964]	I Want More (Live at Montmartre Jazzhus)	SteepleChase	
1982 [1964]	Love for Sale (Live at Montmartre Jazzhus)	SteepleChase	
1983 [1964]	It's You or No One (Live at Montmartre Jazzhus)	SteepleChase	
1983 [1964]	Billie's Bounce (Live at Montmartre Jazzhus)	SteepleChase	
2003 [1965]	Wee Dot (Live at Montmartre Jazzhus)	SteepleChase	with Atli Bjorn
2004 [1965]	Loose Walk (Live at Montmartre Jazzhus)	SteepleChase	
2004 [1965]	Misty (Live at Montmartre Jazzhus)	SteepleChase	
2004 [1965]	Heartaches (Live at Montmartre Jazzhus)	SteepleChase	
2005 [1965]	Ladybird (Live at Montmartre Jazzhus)	SteepleChase	with Donald Byrd
2005 [1966]	Stella by Starlight (Live at Montmartre Jazzhus)	SteepleChase	with Pony Poindexter
2012 [1967]	Satin Doll (Live at Montmartre Jazzhus)	SteepleChase	
2001 [1967]	The Squirrel	Blue Note	
1988 [1967]	Both Sides of Midnight	Black Lion	
1988 [1967]	Body and Soul	Black Lion	
1989 [1967]	Take The "A" Train	Black Lion	
1986, [1969]	After Hours	SteepleChase	with Rolf Ericson
1987, [1969]	After Midnight	SteepleChase	with Rolf Ericson
1971 [1969]	Live at the Amsterdam Paradiso	Catfish; Affinity; Fuel 2000 [US]	with Cees Slinger, Jacques Schols and Han Bennink; this album also known as Our Man In Amsterdam in the US
2001 [1969]	L.T.D. Live At The Left Bank	Prestige	
2002 [1969]	XXL: Live At The Left Bank	Prestige	
1970	Dexter Gordon with Junior Mance at Montreux	Prestige	with Junior Mance
1970	The Chase!	Prestige	with Gene Ammons
2003 [1970]	Live at the Both/And Club, San Francisco	BPM	with George Duke, Donald Garrett and Oliver Johnson
1985 [1971]	The Shadow Of Your Smile	SteepleChase	with Lars Sjosten, Sture Nordin and Fredrik Noren
1973	Blues à la Suisse	Prestige	
1974 [1967]	Blues Walk! The Montmartre Collection, Vol. I	Black Lion	reissued material
1974 [1967]	Blues Walk! The Montmartre Collection, Vol. II	Black Lion	reissued material
2014 [1974]	Candlelight Lady (Live at Montmartre Jazzhus)	SteepleChase	with Kenny Drew, Mads Vinding and Ed Thigpen
1991 [1974]	Round Midnight	SteepleChase	with Benny Bailey
1995 [1974]	Revelation	SteepleChase	with Benny Bailey
2002 [1974]	The Rainbow People	SteepleChase	with Benny Bailey
1976 [1975]	Swiss Nights Vol. 1	SteepleChase	with Kenny Drew, Niels-Henning Orsted Pedersen and Alex Riel
1978 [1975]	Swiss Nights Vol. 2	SteepleChase	
1979 [1975]	Swiss Nights Vol. 3	SteepleChase	
1977 [1976]	Homecoming: Live at the Village Vanguard	Columbia	with Woody Shaw, Ronnie Mathews, Stafford James and Louis Hayes
1979 [1978]	Grand Encounters	Columbia	with Woody Shaw, Curtis Fuller, Johnny Griffin, George Cables and Eddie Jefferson
1998 [1978]	Live at Carnegie Hall	Columbia	with Johnny Griffin, George Cables, Rufus Reid and Eddie Gladden
2018 [1975]	Tokyo 1975	Elemental 5990428	with Kenny Drew, Niels-Henning Orsted Pedersen and Albert "Tootieˮ Heath; includes as a bonus: 1 track recorded in 1973, and 1 more recorded in 1977
2018 [1977]	Espace Cardin 1977	Elemental 5990431	with Al Haig, Pierre Michelot and Kenny Clarke
2019 [1973]	At The Subway Club 1973	Elemental 5990433	with Irv Rochlin, Henk Haverhoek and Tony Inzalaco; includes as a bonus: 2 tracks recorded in 1965, and 2 more recorded in 1971
2020 [1978]	Live in Chateauvallon 1978	Elemental 5990435	with George Cables, Rufus Reid and Eddie Gladden
2012 [1979]	North Sea Jazz Legendary Concert Series: Dexter Gordon 1979	Bob City	CD/DVD; with Arnett Cobb, Budd Johnson, Buddy Tate and Illinois Jacquet
1985, 1990 [1978-79]	Nights at the Keystone (Volume 1)	Blue Note	with George Cables, Rufus Reid and Eddie Gladden
1985, 1990 [1978-79]	Nights at the Keystone (Volume 2)	Blue Note	
1990 [1978-79]	Nights at the Keystone (Volume 3)	Blue Note	
2023 [1981]	Atlanta Georgia May 5, 1981	Storyville	with Kirk Lightsey, Rufus Reid and Eddie Gladden
2025 [1981]	More Than You Know	GleAM	with Kirk Lightsey, David Eubanks and Eddie Gladden

==== Singles/EPs ====
Year	Title	Label	Notes
1947	"The Chase" (Part 1 & 2)"	Dial 1017	78 rpm disc; with Wardell Gray
1948	"The Duel (Part 1 & 2)"	Dial 1028	78 rpm disc; with Teddy Edwards
1952	New Trends of Jazz (Vol. 3)	Savoy XP 8022	7″ EP
1952	New Trends of Jazz (Vol. 4)	Savoy XP 8023	7″ EP
1953	New Sounds in Modern Music (Vol. 2)	Savoy XP 8080	7″ EP

=== As sideman ===
With Gene Ammons

- The Chase! (Prestige, 1970)
- Gene Ammons and Friends at Montreux (Prestige, 1973)

With Louis Armstrong

- Dexter Gordon, Vol. 1: Young Dex 1941–1944 (Masters Of Jazz MJCD 112)
- Louis Armstrong and His Orchestra 1944–1945 (Blue Ace BA 3603)
- Louis Armstrong and His Orchestra (AFRS One Night Stand 240) (V-Disc, 1944)
- Louis Armstrong and His Orchestra (AFRS One Night Stand 253) (V-Disc, 1944)
- Louis Armstrong and His Orchestra (AFRS One Night Stand 267) (V-Disc, 1944)
- Louis Armstrong New Orleans Masters, Vol. 2 (Swing House [UK] SWH 44)
- Louis Armstrong and His Orchestra (AFRS Spotlight Bands 382) (V-Disc, 1944)
- Louis Armstrong – Chronological Study (MCA Decca 3063 72)
- Louis Armstrong and His Orchestra (AFRS Spotlight Bands 444) (V-Disc, 1944)
- Louis Armstrong and His Orchestra (AFRS Spotlight Bands 465) (V-Disc, 1944)
- Various Artists, Louis, Pops and Tram (IAJRC 21) (V-Disc, 1944)
- Louis Armstrong Armed Forces Radio Service 1943/44 (Duke [Italy] D 1021)

With Benny Carter

- The Fabulous Benny Carter (Audio Lab AL 1505, 1946)
- Benny Carter And His Orchestra (AFRS Jubilee 246) (V-Disc, 1947)
- Various Artists, Jazz Off The Air, Vol. 3 (Spotlite SPJ 147) (taken off V-Disc, 1947)

With Billy Eckstine

- The Chronological Billy Eckstine and His Orchestra, 1944-1945 (Classics, 1997)
- The Legendary Big Band (Savoy 17125) 2-CD

With Dizzy Gillespie

- Dexter Gordon, Vol. 2: Young Dex 1944-1946 (Masters Of Jazz MJCD 128)
- Groovin' High (Savoy MG 12020, 1955; CD reissue: Savoy SV 152, 1992)

With Lionel Hampton

- Dexter Gordon, Vol. 1: Young Dex 1941-1944 (Masters Of Jazz MJCD 112)
- Lionel Hampton, Vol. 1: 1941-1942 (MCA Coral COPS 7185, 1974)
- Steppin' Out, Vol. 1 (1942-1945) (Decca 'Jazz Heritage Series' DL 79244, 1969)
- Who's Who in Jazz Presents... Lionel Hampton with Dexter Gordon (Who's Who In Jazz; Aurophon Jazz Classics, 1977) with Hank Jones, Bucky Pizzarelli, George Duvivier, Oliver Jackson and Candido

With Herbie Hancock

- Takin' Off (Blue Note, 1962)
- Round Midnight (Columbia, 1986) soundtrack album

With Fletcher Henderson

- Fletcher Henderson And His Orchestra (AFRS Jubilee 76), (V-Disc, 1944)
- Fletcher Henderson And His Orchestra (AFRS Jubilee 77), (V-Disc, 1944)

With Helen Humes

- Various Artists, Black California (Savoy SJL 2215, 1976)
- Be-Baba-Leba 1942-52 (Whiskey, Women And... KM 701) (Gene Norman's "Just Jazz" Concert, February 2, 1952)
- New Million Dollar Secret (Whiskey, Women And... KM 707) (Gene Norman's "Just Jazz" Concert, February 2, 1952)

With Jackie McLean

- The Meeting (SteepleChase, 1974)
- The Source (SteepleChase, 1974)

With Gerry Mulligan

- Capitol Jazz Classics, Vol. 4: Walking Shoes (Capitol M 11029)
- Classic Capitol Jazz Sessions (Mosaic MQ19-170)

With Leo Parker

- Birth Of Bop, Vol. 1 (Savoy XP 8060, 1953 [1947]) 7" EP
- The Be Bop Boys (Savoy SJL 2225, 1978)

With Pony Poindexter

- Pony's Express (Epic, 1962)
- Stella By Starlight (co-leader) (SteepleChase, 1966)

With Jimmy Rushing

- Jimmy Rushing/Don Redman/Russell Jacquet/Joe Thomas – Big Little Bands (Onyx ORI 220, 1974 [1946])
- Various Artists, Black California, Vol. 2 (Savoy SJL 2242, 1980)

With others

- Rob Agerbeek Trio, All Souls' (Dexterity, 1973) with Henk Haverhoek and Eric Ineke; recorded 11/02/72 at the Haagse Jazz Club, The Hague, Holland
- Tony Bennett, Berlin (Columbia, 1987)
- Nat King Cole, Nat King Cole Meets The Master Saxes 1943 (Phoenix Jazz LP 5)
- Tadd Dameron, Tadd Dameron/Babs Gonzales/Dizzy Gillespie – Capitol Jazz Classics, Vol. 13: Strictly Bebop (Capitol M 11059)
- Booker Ervin, Setting the Pace (Prestige, 1965)
- Lowell Fulson, "Christmas Party Shuffle"* / "Ride Until The Sun Goes Down" (Swing Time 320) (*features Dexter on tenor)
- Wardell Gray, Wardell Gray Memorial, Volume 2 (Prestige, 1955) includes the 1950 Wardell Gray/Dexter Gordon duet "Move"
- Wynonie Harris, "Love Is Like Rain" / "Your Money Don't Mean A Thing"* (King 4217) (*features Dexter on tenor)
- Philly Joe Jones, Philly Mignon (Galaxy, 1977)
- Stan Levey, This Time The Drum's On Me (Bethlehem BCP 37) with Conte Candoli, Frank Rosolino and Lou Levy
- Charlie Parker, Every Bit Of It 1945 (Spotlite SPJ 150)
- Les Thompson, Gene Norman Presents Just Jazz (RCA Victor LPM 3102)
- Various Artists, Afterhours: The Great Pescara Jam Sessions (Volumes 1 & 2) (Ports Song [Italy], 1973)
- Various Artists, OKeh Jazz (Epic EG 37315, 1982) material arranged by Ralph Burns

== See also ==
- List of black Academy Award winners and nominees
