= Stable Mable =

Studio album by Dexter Gordon Quartet
- Released: 1975
- Recorded: March 10, 1975
- Studio: Rosenberg Studio (Copenhagen, Denmark)
- Genre: Jazz
- Length: 71:11 CD with bonus tracks
- Label: SteepleChase SCS 1040
- Producer: Nils Winther

Dexter Gordon chronology
Strings & Things (1975)	Stable Mable (1975)	Swiss Nights Vol. 1 (1975)

Stable Mable is an album led by saxophonist Dexter Gordon recorded in 1975 and released on the Danish SteepleChase label.

== Reception ==
Professional ratings
Review scores
Source	Rating
AllMusic	4.5/5 stars
The Rolling Stone Jazz Record Guide	4/5 stars

In his review for AllMusic, Scott Yanow said "Dexter Gordon is in frequently exuberant form on this quartet session ...the veteran tenor sounds quite inspired throughout the joyous outing".

== Track listing ==
1. "Just Friends" (John Klenner, Sam M. Lewis) - 7:59
2. "Misty" (Johnny Burke, Erroll Garner) - 8:18
3. "Red Cross" (Charlie Parker) - 7:51
4. "So What" (Miles Davis) - 8:23
5. "In a Sentimental Mood" (Duke Ellington, Manny Kurtz, Irving Mills) - 6:54
6. "Stablemates" (Benny Golson) - 9:56
7. "Just Friends" [Alternate Take] (Klenner, Lewis) - 8:09 Bonus track on CD reissue
8. "Misty" [Alternate Take] (Burke, Garner) - 7:45 Bonus track on CD reissue
9. "Red Cross" [Alternate Take] (Parker) - 6:12 Bonus track on CD reissue

== Personnel ==
- Dexter Gordon - tenor saxophone, soprano saxophone
- Horace Parlan - piano
- Niels-Henning Ørsted Pedersen - bass
- Tony Inzalaco - drums
