= Black Lion Records =

British jazz record company

- Founded: 1968
- Founder: Alan Bates
- Genre: Jazz
- Country of origin: UK
- Location: London, England

Black Lion Records was a British jazz record company and label based in London, England.

Alan Bates founded Black Lion Records in 1968. The label had two series of releases, one for British jazz musicians and one for international musicians. It released a large amount of reissue material, including items by Art Tatum, Jay McShann, Ben Webster, Earl Hines, Bud Freeman, Bud Powell, Don Byas, Coleman Hawkins, Mal Waldron, and Duke Ellington. It had a subsidiary called Freedom Records, which concentrated on free jazz releases; this wing was bought by Arista Records in 1975.

The label was distributed by Polydor for part of its existence. It became part of D. A. Music in the 1980s, while Bates bought Candid Records in 1989 and shifted the focus of his activities there.

== Discography ==
Catalogue	Artist	Album	Year
3701-2	Various	The Original Jazz Masters Series Volume 1 (CD, Comp)	
3702-5	Various	The Original Jazz Masters Series Volume 2 (CD, Comp)	1973
4291	Cecil Taylor	Silent Tongues (LP, Album)	1977
27 707-9	Various	Black Lion Jam Session (2xLP, Comp)	1973
65 102	Philly Joe Jones*	Gone, Gone, Gone! (LP, Album)	
65104	Stanley Cowell*	Brilliant Circles (LP, Album, RP)	1983
65.115	Sun Ra and His Arkestra*	Pictures of Infinity (LP, Album, RE)	
65122	Bud Powell	The Invisible Cage (LP, Album, RE, RM)	
65 605	Cecil Taylor	The Great Paris Concert (2xLP, Album, RE)	1983
25 113-2 B	Alexis Korner, Memphis Slim	Rock Me Baby	1972
26 300 4 U	Barney Kessel	Blue Soul (LP, Comp)	1975
28 401-8 MB	Teddy Wilson	Stomping at the Savoy (LP, Album)	1971
28 410-9 U	Charles Tolliver and His All Stars	Charles Tolliver and His All Stars (LP, Album)	1971
28 414-1 U	Nat King Cole, Buddy Rich & Charlie Shavers	Anatomy of a Jam Session (LP, Album, Mono, RE)	1971
28 415-8 U	Dexter Gordon	The Montmartre Collection Vol. 1 (LP, Album)	1971
28 416-6 U	Kenny Clarke/Francy Boland Big Band*	At Her Majesty's Pleasure... (LP, Album)	1971
28 420-8 U	Alex Welsh & His Band*	If I Had a Talking Picture of You (LP, Album)	1972
28 421-4 U	Sun Ra and His Arkestra*	Pictures of Infinity (LP, Album)	1972
28 433-1 Z	Charles Tolliver's Music Inc.*	Live at the Loosdrecht Jazz Festival (2xLP, Album)	1972
28 449-7 U	Thelonious Monk	The Man I Love (LP, Album)	1973
28 462-0 U	Stéphane Grappelli	Just One of Those Things! (LP, Album)	1973
28 477-8 U	Dexter Gordon	Blues Walk! The Montmartre Collection Vol. II (LP, Album)	1974
2460 125	Alex Welsh and His Band, Humphrey Lyttelton, George Chisholm	The Melody Maker Tribute to Louis Armstrong Vol. III (LP, Album)	1971
2460 128	Bill Coleman (2) / Ben Webster	Swingin' in London (LP, Album)	1972
2460 139	Charles Tolliver and His All Stars	Charles Tolliver and His All Stars (LP, Album)	1971
2460-189	Oscar Pettiford	Blue Brothers (LP, Album)	1973
2460 191	Paul Gonsalves / Ray Nance	Just a-Sittin and a-Rockin (LP, Album)	1973
2460 194	Freddy Randall – Dave Shepherd	Jazz All Stars	
2460-200	Earl Hines	Tour de Force (LP, Album)	1973
2460-208	Chris Barber	Drat That Fratle Rat! (LP, Album)	1972
2683 047	Stephane Grappelli* With Hot Club of London, The*	I Got Rhythm! (2xLP, Album)	1974
B-11836-75	Various	Jazz at Black Lion (2xLP, Comp)	1975
BL-047	Stéphane Grappelli	I Got Rhythm! (2xLP, Album)	1974
BL – 105	Stéphane Grappelli / Barney Kessel	I Remember Django (LP, Album)	1970
BL 106	Sun Ra and His Arkestra*	Pictures of Infinity (LP, Album)	1971
BL-108	Dexter Gordon	The Monmartre Collection Vol. 1 (LP, Album)	1971
BL-111	Ben Webster	Atmosphere for Lovers and Thieves (LP, Album)	
BL-130	Barney Kessel	Swinging Easy! (LP, Album)	1969
BL-131	Kenny Clarke/Francy Boland Big Band*	At Her Majesty's Pleasure... (LP, Album)	1971
BL-146	Illinois Jacquet	Genius at Work! (LP, Album)	1971
BL-152	Thelonious Monk	Something in Blue (LP, Album)	1971
BL-153	Bud Powell	The Invisible Cage (LP, Album)	1971
BL-155	Memphis Slim	Rock Me Baby!	
BL-158	Art Tatum	The Genius	1967
BL-159	Coleman Hawkins & Bud Powell	Hawk in Germany (LP, Album)	1972
BL-190	Ben Webster	Duke's in Bed! (LP, Album)	1969
BL-191	Paul Gonsalves, Ray Nance	Just a-sittin' and a-rockin' (LP, Album)	
BL 192	Dollar Brand	This Is Dollar Brand	1965
BL-197	Thelonious Monk	The Man I Love	1973
BL-302	Ben Webster	Saturday Night at the Montmartre	1974
BL-307	Sonny Stitt & the Giants	Night Work	1974
BL-309	Dexter Gordon	Blues Walk! The Montmartre Collection Vol. II (LP, Album)	1974
BL-310	Barney Kessel	Blue Soul (LP, Comp)	1975
BL-311	Piano Red	Ain't Goin' to Be Your Low Down Dog No More	1974
BL-313	Stephane Grappelli*	The Talk of the Town (LP, Album)	1975
BL 278.108	Ben Webster	Duke's in Bed! (LP, Album)	1974
BLM 51010	Sweet Substitute	Sophisticated Ladies	1981
BLM 51101	Ottilie Patterson with Chris Barber	Madame Blues & Doctor Jazz! (12"")	1984
BLM 51503	Ornette Coleman	An Evening with Ornette Coleman Vol. 1 (Album) ◄ (2 versions)	1972
BLM 51504	Ornette Coleman	An Evening with Ornette Coleman Vol. 2 (LP, Album)	1972
BLM 52001	Duke Ellington	Serenade to Sweden (LP, Album)	1982
BLM 52004	Bo Diddley	I'm a Man (LP, Album)	1982
BLM 52009	Sonny Stitt & the Giants	Loverman	1974
BLM 52011	Duke Ellington	Magenta Haze	1983
BLM 52014	Bo Diddley	Road Runner	1983
BLM 52022	Earl Hines	The Pearls	1983
BLM 61001	Chris Barber and Dr. John with Freddie Kohlman	Take Me Back to New Orleans (2xLP)	1980
BLM61003/4	Chris Barber	The Chris Barber Jazz and Blues Band – Barbican Blues (2xLP)	1982
BLP 306	Earl Hines & Paul Gonsalves	It Don't Mean A Thing If It Ain't Got That Swing!	1975
BLP 12100	Ray Russell	Secret Asylum (LP, Album)	1973
BLP 12113	Alex Welsh featuring George Chisholm, Humphrey Lyttelton, Bruce Turner	An Evening with Alex Welsh and His Friends Part 2	1972
BLP 12121	Alex Welsh Band, The*	Showcase 2	1976
BLP 12131	Alex Welsh & His Band	Dixieland Party (LP, Album)	1974
BLP 12134	Humphrey Lyttelton	Take It from The Top – A Dedication to Duke Ellington	1975
BLP 12136	Ken Colyer	Darkness on the Delta	1979
BLP 12145	Rod Mason	Good Companions (LP, Album)	1977
BLP 12150	Cleo Laine	At the Wavendon Festival	1976
BLP 12151	Dudley Moore	At the Wavendon Festival (LP, Album)	1976
BLP 12163	Alan Elsdon Band, The*	Jazz Journeymen	1977
BLP 12174	Pete Allen (2)	Turkey Trot	1979
BLP 12175	Digby Fairweather	Havin' Fun (LP, Album)	1979
BLP 12185	Pete Allen (2)	Down in Honky Tonk Town	1979
BLP 30102	Dexter Gordon	The Montmartre Collection Vol. 1 (LP, Album, RE)	1981
BLP 30103	Sun Ra and His Arkestra*	Pictures of Infinity (Album) ◄ (3 versions)	1971
BLP 30104	Nat King Cole, Buddy Rich & Charlie Shavers	Anatomy of a Jam Session (LP, Album, Mono, RE)	1971
BLP 30105	Ben Webster	Atmosphere for Lovers and Thieves (LP, Album)	
BLP 30106	Earl Hines	Tea for Two	1971
BLP 30107	Barney Kessel	Swinging Easy! (LP, Album)	1971
BLP 30109	Kenny Clarke/Francy Boland Big Band	At Her Majesty's Pleasure.... (Album) ◄ (2 versions)	1971
BLP 30110	Ruby Braff	Hear Me Talkin '	1971
BLP 30111	Hampton Hawes	Spanish Steps (Album) ◄ (2 versions)	1971
BLP 30114	Teddy Wilson	Stomping at the Savoy (LP, Album)	1971
BLP30116	Philly Joe Jones	Trailways Express (Vinyl, Ste)	1971
BLP 30117	Charles Tolliver and His All Stars	Charles Tolliver and His All Stars (LP, Album)	1971
BLP 30119	Thelonious Monk	Something in Blue (Album) ◄ (2 versions)	1971
BLP 30120	Bud Powell	The Invisible Cage (LP, Album, RE, RM)	
BLP 30121	André Previn	That Old Blue Magic	1972
BLP 30124	Art Tatum	The Genius (LP, Album, Mono)	1967
BLP 30125	Coleman Hawkins & Bud Powell	Hawk in Germany (LP, Album)	1972
BLP 30126	Don Byas	Anthropology	1967
BLP 30133	Teddy Wilson	Moonglow (LP, Album)	1972
BLP 30134	Johnny Griffin	You Leave Me Breathless (Album)(two versions)	1972
BLP 30136	Cliff Jackson	Carolina Shout ! (LP, Album)	1973
BLP 30137	Ben Webster	Duke's in Bed (LP, Album)	1969
BLP 30139	Dollar Brand	This Is Dollar Brand (LP, Album)	1973
BLP 30141	Thelonious Monk	The Man I Love	1973
BLP 30142	Mal Waldron	Blues for Lady Day (Album) ◄ (3 versions)	1973
BLP 30143	Earl Hines	Tour De Force (LP, Album)	1973
BLP 30144	Jay McShann	The Band That Jumps the Blues (LP, Comp, Mono)	1973
BLP 30150	Bill Coleman & Guy Lafitte	Mainstream at Montreux (LP, Album)	1973
BLP 30151	Barney Kessel	Summertime in Montreux (LP, Album)	1973
BLP 30152	Stéphane Grappelli	Just One of Those Things! (LP, Album)	1974
BLP 30155	Ben Webster	Saturday Night at the Montmartre (LP, Album)	1974
BLP 30156	Teddy Wilson	Striding After Fats (LP, Album)	1974
BLP 30157	Dexter Gordon	Blues Walk! The Montmartre Collection Vol. II (LP, Album)	1974
BLP 30161	Barney Kessel	Blue Soul (LP, Comp)	1975
BLP 30162	Piano Red	Ain't Goin' to Be Your Low Down Dog No More	1975
BLP 30172	Carmen McRae and the Kenny Clarke/Francy Boland Big Band	November Girl	1975
BLP 30173	Ben Webster	Midnight at the Montmartre (LP, Album)	1977
BLP 30182	Ben Webster	Sunday Morning at the Montmartre (LP, Album)	1977
BLP 30183	Stephane Grappelli*, Roland Hanna · Jiri Mraz* · Mel Lewis	Stephane Grappelli Meets the Rhythm Section (LP, Album)	1975
BLP 30185	Oscar Pettiford featuring Attila Zoller	The Legendary Oscar Pettiford (LP, Album)	1975
BLP 30187	Wild Bill Davison with Freddy Randall and His Band*	Wild Bill Davison With Freddy Randall and His Band (LP, Album, RE, Sec)	1977
BLP 30196	Memphis Slim	Chicago Boogie (LP, Album)	1976
BLP 30200	Teddy Wilson	Cole Porter Classics (LP, Album)	1978
BLP 30203	Art Tatum	The V-Disc	1978
BLP 60109	Walter Bishop, Jr.	Milestones	1989
BLP 60122	Freddie Hubbard	Minor Mishap	1989
BLP60112	Barney Kessel	Autumn Leaves (LP, Comp)	1989
BLP 60116	Thelonious Monk	The London Collection: Volume Two	1988
BLP 60 911	Lee Wiley – Ellis Larkins	Duologue (LP, Album)	1988
BLP 12110/1	Chris Barber Jazz and Blues Band, The	Live in Berlin (2xLP)	1973
BLP 12124/5	Chris Barber	The Chris Barber Jubilee Album 1 (1949 – 1959) (2xLP)	1974
BLP 30131/30132	Charles Tolliver 's Music Inc.*	Live at the Loosdrecht Jazz Festival (2xLP, Album)	1972
BLPX 12137/8	Max Collie Rhythm Aces	World Champions of Jazz (2xLP, Gat)	1976
CBB 1	Chris Barber Jazz And Blues Band, The	The Chris Barber Jazz and Blues Band	1978
CD 9007	Steve Lacy	The Straight Horn of Steve Lacy (CD, Album, RE)	
ESTEREO 4288	Roswell Rudd	Flexible Flyer (LP, Album)	1975
INT 147.002	Stephane Grappelli* & Earl Hines	The Giants	1977
INT 147.006	Wild Bill Davison with Freddy Randall and His Band*	Wild Bill Davison with Freddy Randall and His Band (LP, RE)	1977
INT 147.014	Count Basie	Ain't It the Truth	1981
INT 157.005	Alex Welsh & His Band* – George Chisholm – Humphrey Lyttelton – Bruce Turner	Salute to Satchmo (2xLP, Album, RE)	1977
INT 157.007	Chris Barber and Dr. John	Take Me Back to New Orleans (2xLP)	1980
Mono 28446-3 U	Fred McDowell	Mississippi Delta Blues (LP, Bla)	1965
PA-7041	Thelonious Monk	Something in Blue (LP, Album, RE)	1972
PAP-9054	Cleo Laine	At the Wavendon Festival	1976
(S) 4256	Johnny Griffin	You Leave Me Breathless	1972
S-4265	Ornette Coleman	In Europe Volume 1 (LP, Album)	1975
BLCD 760124	Oscar Pettiford	Montmartre Blues	1989
