= Rune Bech =

Danish founder and journalist (born 1966)

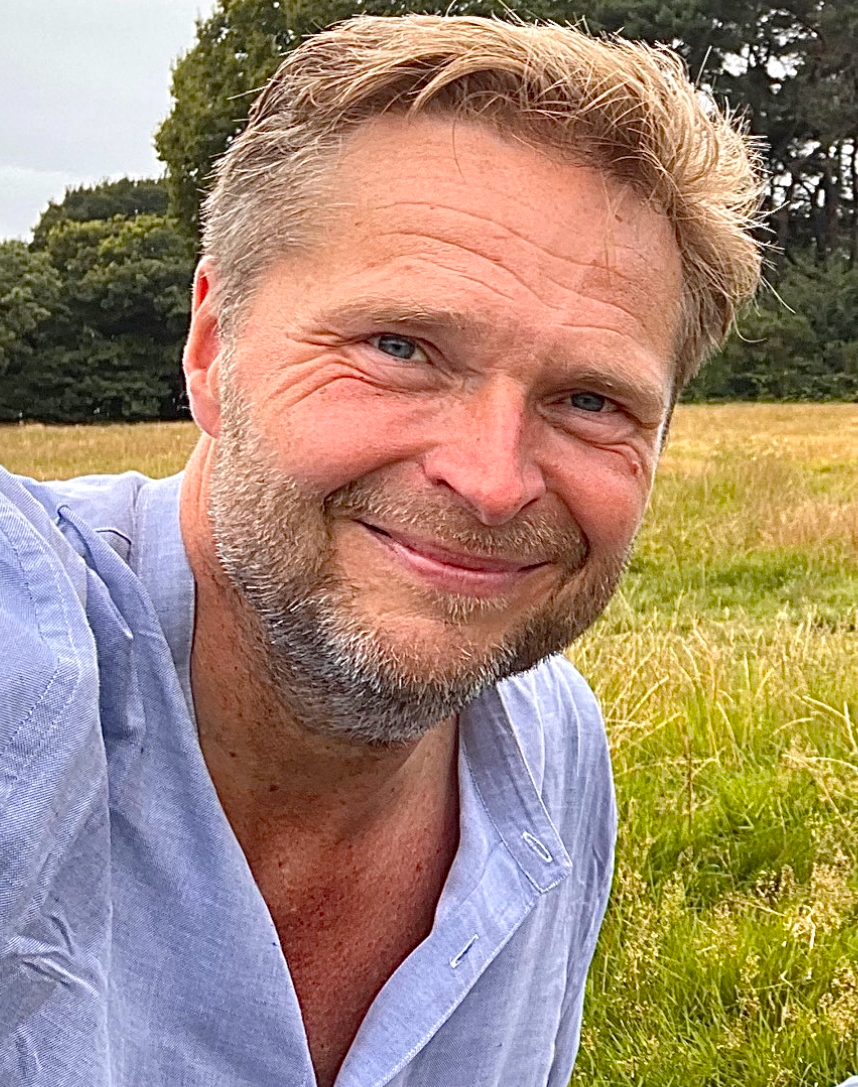
- Born: June 26, 1966 (age 59); Denmark
- Education: Educated a broadcast journalist at the Danish School of Journalism, Aarhus, with an internship at the United Nations in New York City. Later studied East European Politics and History at University of Sussex, and took short executive courses at INSEAD at Fontainebleau and Singapore.
- Occupations: Digital entrepreneur, former journalist and broadcast executive
- Employer(s): Co-founded NetDoctor.com in 1998, E-Doktor in 2002, SundhedsDoktor in 2008, Jazzhouse Montmartre in 2010, and Liva Healthcare in 2015
- Children: 2

Rune Bech (born 26 June 1966, in Denmark) is a Danish digital entrepreneur, and a former foreign correspondent, broadcast journalist and television executive. In 1998 he was one of the early internet pioneers in Europe when he co-founded the independent health information portal NetDoctor.com.

Later, after six years as digital head for Denmark's national broadcaster TV 2 he co-founded the healthtech company Liva Healthcare working with NHS England since 2017. As a non-profit passion project in 2010 he reopened Copenhagen's historic jazz venue, Jazzhus Montmartre staging 150+ concerts a year.

== Career ==
After an early career as a foreign correspondent for the Danish newspaper Politiken from 1989 until 1997 (Eastern Europe and London), and as a foreign affairs reporter with the national Danish broadcaster TV 2 until 1998, he co-founded the independent health information portal NetDoctor.com in 1998 and took it from a Danish start-up into being a digital publisher of health information across Britain, Germany, Scandinavia and other European countries. Later, in 2001, he re-joined TV 2 as Chief Digital Officer for six years. In this position on December 6 2004 his team launched the TV and film on-demand services, TV 2 Sputnik, later renamed TV 2 Play.

After co-founding two other healthtech companies E-Doktor (2002-2008) and SundhedsDoktor (2006-2016), he co-founded Liva Healthcare in 2015, specialising in digital lifestyle related chronic condition management, with offices in London and Copenhagen. In 2017, NHS England selected Liva Health as a preferred digital innovation partner in trying to prevent and reverse type 2 diabetes and obesity (The "Healthier You" Digital Diabetes Prevention Programme, DDPP).

As a passion project beginning in May 2010, Rune Bech initiated the re-opening of Copenhagen's historic jazz venue, Jazzhus Montmartre. The place has a story going back to 1959 when it put Copenhagen on the world map of jazz by attracting some of the best artists of the time. Several famous jazz musicians fell in love with the place and relocated to Copenhagen in the 1960s and 1970s. Among them Dexter Gordon, Ben Webster, Stan Getz, Kenny Drew, and many more. Using Jazzhus Montmartre as their hub, they served as mentors for major Danish jazz artists such as Niels-Henning Ørsted Pedersen, Palle Mikkelborg, Bo Stief, Alex Riel and many more.

== Personal life ==
Rune Bech is the son of deputy headmaster Thomas Bech Pedersen (b 1920) and pre-school teacher Anne Margrethe Nygaard Pedersen (b 1931). He grew up as the youngest of four children at a hobby farm near the village of Køng on the Danish island of Funen. He has two sons. Rune Bech is a keen sailor, an arts lover and a writer.
