= Cheesecake (disambiguation) =

Cheesecake is a dessert.

Cheesecake or cheese cake may also refer to:

== Music ==
- Cheese Cake (album), by Dexter Gordon
- "Cheescake" (Teo song), by Belarusian singer Teo
- "Cheese Cake", a song on the Aerosmith album Night in the Ruts (1979)
- "Cheese Cake", a song on the Dexter Gordon album Go (1962)

== Other uses ==
- "Cheesecakes" (The Apprentice), a 2024 television episode
- Agent Cheesecake, a Marvel comics character
- Cheesecake Road, in York County, Virginia
- Half of the duo Bubbles & Cheesecake, an online multimedia collaboration
- Glamour photography, of women emphasizing sex appeal
- Pin-up models, women posing suggestively
