= The Source (Jackie McLean album) =

Live album by Jackie McLean featuring Dexter Gordon
- Released: 1974
- Recorded: July 20–21, 1973
- Venue: Jazzhus Montmartre, Copenhagen, Denmark
- Genre: Straight-ahead jazz
- Length: 70:25
- Label: SteepleChase; SCS-1020
- Producer: Nils Winther

Jackie McLean chronology
The Meeting (1973)	The Source (1974)	Antiquity (1974)

Dexter Gordon chronology
The Meeting (1973)	The Source (1973)	The Apartment (1974)

The Source is a live album by American saxophonist Jackie McLean featuring Dexter Gordon, recorded at the Jazzhus Montmartre in 1973 and released on the SteepleChase label.

== Critical reception ==
Professional ratings
Review scores
Source	Rating
AllMusic	3/5 stars
The Penguin Guide to Jazz Recordings	3/4 stars
The Rolling Stone Jazz Record Guide	5/5 stars

Robert Christgau wrote in his 1977 column in The Village Voice that he preferred The Source to both McLean's The Meeting and Gordon's 1976 Homecoming if he wanted to "hear recent live Dexter". AllMusic critic Scott Yanow was less enthusiastic, writing that "the music is a bit loose and long-winded ('Half Nelson' is over 18 minutes long) but recommended to straightahead jazz fans".

== Track listing ==
1. "Half Nelson" (Miles Davis) - 18:36
2. "I Can't Get Started" (Vernon Duke, Ira Gershwin) - 7:18
3. "Another Hair-Do" (Charlie Parker) - 13:31
4. "Dexter Digs In" (Dexter Gordon) - 11:04

== Personnel ==
- Jackie McLean – alto saxophone
- Dexter Gordon – tenor saxophone
- Kenny Drew – piano
- Niels-Henning Ørsted Pedersen – bass
- Alex Riel – drums
