= DDPP (disambiguation) =

DDPP may refer to:

- Double deck push-pull, a train carriage type; see Israel Railways
- Deputy Directors of Public Prosecutions, of the Prosecutions Division, Hong Kong
- Digital Diabetes Prevention Programme, of NHS England; see Rune Bech
