= It's You or No One (Dexter Gordon album) =

Live album by Dexter Gordon Quartet
- Released: 1983
- Recorded: August 6, 1964
- Venue: Jazzhus Montmartre, Copenhagen, Denmark
- Genre: Jazz
- Length: 49:33
- Label: SteepleChase; SCC-6022
- Producer: Nils Winther

Dexter Gordon chronology
Love for Sale (1964)	It's You or No One (1983)	Billie's Bounce (1964)

It's You or No One (subtitled Dexter In Radioland Vol. 6) is a live album by American saxophonist Dexter Gordon recorded at the Jazzhus Montmartre in Copenhagen, Denmark in 1964 by Danmarks Radio and released on the SteepleChase label in 1983.

== Critical reception ==
Professional ratings
Review scores
Source	Rating
AllMusic	4/5 stars
The Penguin Guide to Jazz Recordings	2.5/4 stars

AllMusic critic Scott Yanow stated "He performs extended versions of four standards with creativity and the music is quite enjoyable, recommended to bop fans".

== Track listing ==
1. Introduction by Dexter Gordon – 0:21
2. "Just Friends" (John Klenner, Sam M. Lewis) – 12:09
3. "Three O'Clock in the Morning" (Julián Robledo, Dorothy Terriss) – 12:27
4. "Where Are You?" (Jimmy McHugh, Harold Adamson) – 9:44
5. "It's You or No One" (Sammy Cahn, Jule Styne) – 14:47

== Personnel ==
- Dexter Gordon – tenor saxophone
- Tete Montoliu – piano
- Niels-Henning Ørsted Pedersen – bass
- Alex Riel – drums
