= The Meeting (Jackie McLean album) =

Live album by Jackie McLean featuring Dexter Gordon
- Released: 1974; 51 years ago
- Recorded: July 20–21, 1973
- Venue: Jazzhus Montmartre in Copenhagen, Denmark
- Genre: Jazz
- Length: 63:46
- Label: SteepleChase; SCS-1006
- Producer: Nils Winther

Jackie McLean chronology
A Ghetto Lullaby (1973)	The Meeting (1974)	The Source (1973)

Dexter Gordon chronology
Blues à la Suisse (1973)	The Meeting (1973)	The Source (1973)

The Meeting is a live album by American saxophonist Jackie McLean featuring Dexter Gordon recorded at the Jazzhus Montmartre in 1973 and released on the SteepleChase label.

== Reception ==
Professional ratings
Review scores
Source	Rating
Allmusic	3/5 stars
The Rolling Stone Jazz Record Guide	3/5 stars
The Penguin Guide to Jazz Recordings	3/4 stars

The Allmusic review by Scott Yanow awarded the album 3 stars and stated "The music falls short of being classic but is quite spirited and recommended to fans of both Dexter Gordon and Jackie McLean".

== Track listing ==
1. Introduction by Jackie McLean - 0:50
2. "All Clean" (Dexter Gordon) - 17:10
3. "Rue de La Harpe" (Sahib Shihab) - 8:34
4. "Callin'" (Kenny Drew) - 13:41 Bonus track on CD reissue
5. "Sunset" (Drew) - 10:37
6. "On the Trail" (Ferde Grofé) - 13:13

== Personnel ==
- Jackie McLean – alto saxophone
- Dexter Gordon – tenor saxophone
- Kenny Drew – piano
- Niels-Henning Ørsted Pedersen – bass
- Alex Riel – drums
