= Misty (Dexter Gordon album) =

Live album by Dexter Gordon
- Released: September 7, 2004
- Recorded: July 8, 1965
- Venue: Jazzhus Montmartre, Copenhagen, Denmark
- Genre: Jazz
- Length: 47:30
- Label: SteepleChase; SCCD-36033
- Producer: Nils Winther

Dexter Gordon chronology
Loose Walk (1965)	Misty (2004)	Heartaches (1965)

Misty is a live album by American saxophonist Dexter Gordon recorded at the Jazzhus Montmartre in Copenhagen, Denmark in 1965 by Danmarks Radio and released on the SteepleChase label in 2004.

== Critical reception ==
Professional ratings
Review scores
Source	Rating
AllMusic	4/5 stars
The Penguin Guide to Jazz Recordings	3/4 stars

AllMusic critic Matt Collar stated "these recordings stand as previously unissued testaments to the muscular and tender mid-career brilliance of Gordon. ... While Misty may only contain four standards that taken together clock in at just over 45 minutes, the playing by all involved is stellar, immediate, and inspired".

== Track listing ==
1. "Take the "A" Train" (Billy Strayhorn) – 14:42
2. "Shiny Stockings" (Frank Foster) – 16:27
3. "Misty" (Erroll Garner) – 15:06
4. "Cheese Cake" (Dexter Gordon) – 1:15

== Personnel ==
- Dexter Gordon – tenor saxophone
- Kenny Drew – piano
- Niels-Henning Ørsted Pedersen – bass
- Alex Riel – drums
