= Billie's Bounce (album) =

Live album by Dexter Gordon Quartet
- Released: 1983
- Recorded: August 20, 1964
- Venue: Jazzhus Montmartre, Copenhagen, Denmark
- Genre: Jazz
- Length: 50:48
- Label: SteepleChase; SCC-6028
- Producer: Nils Winther

Dexter Gordon chronology
I Want More (1964)	Billie's Bounce (1983)	Clubhouse (1965)

Billie's Bounce (subtitled Dexter In Radioland Vol. 7) is a live album by American saxophonist Dexter Gordon recorded at the Jazzhus Montmartre in Copenhagen, Denmark in 1964 by Danmarks Radio and released on the SteepleChase label in 1979.

== Critical reception ==
Professional ratings
Review scores
Source	Rating
AllMusic	4/5 stars
The Penguin Guide to Jazz Recordings	2.5/4 stars

AllMusic critic Scott Yanow stated "The well-recorded performances feature the great bop tenor in peak form and are easily recommended as is this entire Dexter in Radioland series".

== Track listing ==
1. Introduction by Dexter Gordon – 0:28
2. "Billie's Bounce" (Charlie Parker) – 17:17
3. "Night in Tunisia" (Dizzy Gillespie) – 4:12
4. Introduction by Dexter Gordon – 0:12
5. "Satin Doll" (Duke Ellington, Billy Strayhorn, Johnny Mercer) – 16:21
6. "Soul Sister" (Dexter Gordon) – 13:18

== Personnel ==
- Dexter Gordon – tenor saxophone,
- Tete Montoliu – piano
- Niels-Henning Ørsted Pedersen – bass
- Alex Riel – drums
