= Live at Montmartre (Jackie McLean album) =

Live album by Jackie McLean Quartet
- Released: 1972
- Recorded: August 5, 1972
- Venue: Jazzhus Montmartre in Copenhagen, Denmark
- Genre: Jazz
- Length: 61:19
- Label: SteepleChase; SCS-1001
- Producer: Nils Winther

Jackie McLean Quartet chronology
Demon's Dance (1970)	Live at Montmartre (1972)	Altissimo (1973)

Live at Montmartre is an album by American saxophonist Jackie McLean recorded at the Jazzhus Montmartre in 1972 and released on the SteepleChase label.

== Reception ==
The Allmusic review by Scott Yanow awarded the album 4 stars and stated "Although not as advanced as some of his Blue Note classics of the 1960s, McLean is in top form and quite explorative during these performances; his sound is certainly instantly recognizable".

Professional ratings
Review scores
Source	Rating
Allmusic	4/5 stars
The Rolling Stone Jazz Record Guide	4/5 stars
The Penguin Guide to Jazz Recordings	4/4 stars

== Track listing ==
All compositions by Jackie McLean except where noted.

1. "Smile" (Charlie Chaplin) - 15:31
2. "Das Dat" - 16:37
3. "Parker's Mood" (Charlie Parker) - 19:21
4. "Confirmation" (Parker) - 9:30 Bonus track on CD reissue
5. "Closing" - 0:23

== Personnel ==
- Jackie McLean – alto saxophone
- Kenny Drew – piano
- Bo Stief – bass
- Alex Riel – drums
