= A Ghetto Lullaby =

Live album by Jackie McLean
- Released: 1974
- Recorded: July 18–19, 1973
- Venue: Jazzhus Montmartre in Copenhagen, Denmark
- Genre: Jazz
- Length: 41:20
- Label: SteepleChase; SCS-1013
- Producer: Nils Winther

Jackie McLean chronology
Ode to Super (1973)	A Ghetto Lullaby (1974)	The Meeting (1973)

A Ghetto Lullaby is a live album by American saxophonist Jackie McLean recorded at the Jazzhus Montmartre in 1973 and released on the SteepleChase label.

== Reception ==
Professional ratings
Review scores
Source	Rating
AllMusic	3/5 stars
The Rolling Stone Jazz Record Guide	3/5 stars
The Penguin Guide to Jazz Recordings	3/4 stars

The AllMusic review by Scott Yanow states, "the altoist's passionate solos and very distinctive sound uplift the music and make this an advanced hard bop set worth acquiring".

== Track listing ==
1. "Jack's Tune" (Jackie McLean) - 11:02
2. "Mode for Jay Mac" (Billy Gault) - 9:08
3. "Where Is Love?" (Lionel Bart) - 5:26
4. "Callin'" (Kenny Drew) - 8:30
5. "A Ghetto Lullaby" (Gault) - 7:14

== Personnel ==
- Jackie McLean – alto saxophone
- Kenny Drew – piano
- Niels-Henning Ørsted Pedersen – bass
- Alex Riel – drums
