= Alex Riel =

Danish jazz and rock drummer (1940–2024)

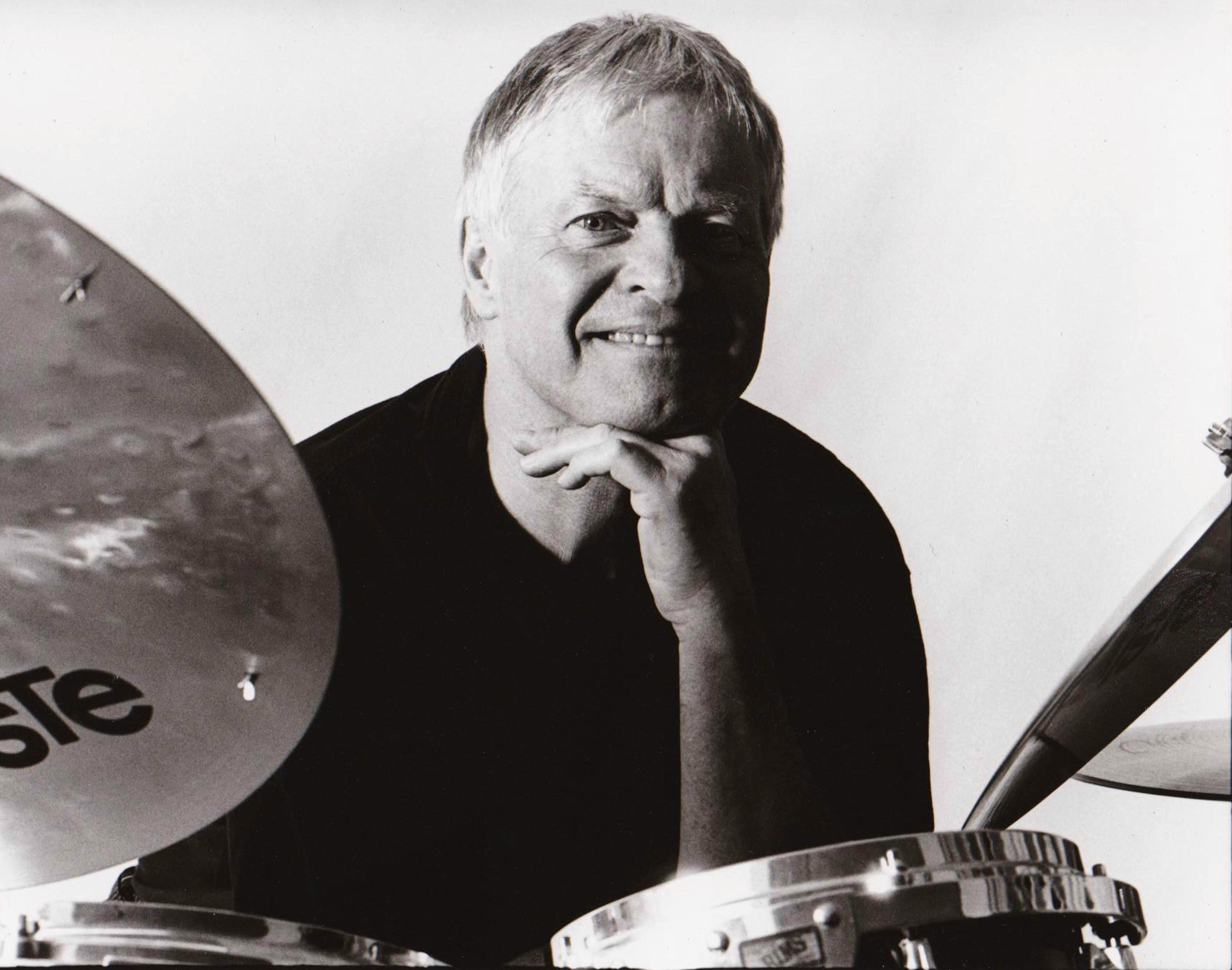
- Alex Riel photo by Gorm Valentin

Background information
- Born: 13 September 1940; Copenhagen, Denmark
- Died: 9 June 2024 (aged 83) Liseleje, Denmark
- Genres: Jazz, rock
- Occupation: Musician
- Instrument: Drums
- Years active: 1962–2024
- Website: www.alexriel.dk

Alex Riel (13 September 1940 – 9 June 2024) was a Danish jazz and rock drummer. His first group, the Alex Riel/Palle Mikkelborg Quintet, won the Montreux Grand Prix Award at the Montreux Jazz Festival in 1968. He was married to the writer Ane Riel.

== Biography ==
Riel recorded with, among others, Booker Ervin, Kenny Drew, Kenny Werner, Bob Brookmeyer, Thomas Clausen, Bill Evans, Eddie "Lockjaw" Davis, Donald Byrd, Don Cherry, Thad Jones, and Ben Webster. He formed a jazz ensemble with bass player Niels-Henning Ørsted Pedersen. Riel was also a founding member in 1968 of the Danish rock group The Savage Rose. His album The Riel Deal won a Danish Grammy for Best Danish Jazz Album in 1996.

In September 2010, Riel's 70th birthday celebration at the Jazzhus Montmartre was broadcast live with the title Celebration of a Living Jazz Legend by the Danish national television station TV2.

== Personal life and death ==
Riel married crime fiction author Ane Riel in 2002. They lived in Liseleje in North Zealand from 2005 until his death. He died at his home there on 9 June 2024, at the age of 83.

== Awards ==
- Danish Jazz Musician Award 1965 presented by Duke Ellington and Sam Woodyard (Photo)
- Ben Webster Prize 1999 (shared with Niels-Henning Ørsted Pedersen and Olivier Antunes)
- Danish Grammy for Best Danish Jazz Album of 1996 for The Riel Deal
- Life Time Achievement Award from IFPI 2007 (Photo)

== Discography ==
=== As leader ===
- Alex Riel Trio (Fona, 1965) – with Kenny Drew, Niels-Henning Ørsted Pedersen
- Emergence (Red, 1994) – with Jesper Lundgaard, Jerry Bergonzi
- The Riel Deal (Stunt, 1996) – with Kenny Werner, Jerry Bergonzi
- Unriel (Stunt, 1997) – with Jerry Bergonzi, Michael Brecker, Eddie Gómez, Mike Stern, Niels Lan Doky
- DSB Kino (Stunt, 1998) – with Harry Sweets Edison, Roger Kellaway
- Rielatin (Stunt, 1999) – with Jerry Bergonzi, Mike Stern, Kenny Werner
- Celebration (Stunt, 2000)
- Live at Jive (Stunt, 2001) – with Luts Büchner Quartet
- Alex Riel Trio: What Happened? (Cowbell, 2004)
- Alex Riel Trio: The High & The Mighty (Cowbell, 2007)
- Alex Riel Quartet: Live at Stars (Cowbell, 2008) – with Charlie Mariano
- Alex Riel Quartet: Riel Time (Cowbell, 2008)
- Get Riel (Cowbell, 2008)

=== As sideman ===
With Steve Dobrogosz

- Confessions (Prophone, 1980)
- Scary Bright (Dragon, 1984) – with Berit Andersson

With Kenny Dorham

- Scandia Skies (SteepleChase, 1963 [1980])
- Short Story (SteepleChase, 1963 [1979])

With Dexter Gordon

- Cheese Cake (SteepleChase, 1964 [1979])
- King Neptune (SteepleChase, 1964 [1979])
- Love for Sale (SteepleChase, 1964 [1982])
- It's You or No One (SteepleChase, 1964 [1983])
- Billie's Bounce (SteepleChase, 1964 [1983])
- Loose Walk (SteepleChase 1965 [2003])
- Misty (SteepleChase, 1965 [2004])
- Heartaches (SteepleChase, 1965 [2004])
- Ladybird (SteepleChase, 1965 [2005])
- More Than You Know (SteepleChase, 1975)
- Swiss Nights Vol. 1 (SteepleChase, 1975 [1976])
- Swiss Nights Vol. 2 (SteepleChase, 1975 [1978])
- Swiss Nights Vol. 3 (SteepleChase, 1975 [1979])
- Lullaby for a Monster (SteepleChase, 1976 [1981])

With Karin Krog

- You Must Believe in Spring (Polydor, 1974)
- Love Songs (Polydor, 1977)
- Something Borrowed … Something New (Meantime, 1989) – with Niels-Henning Ørsted Pedersen, Kenny Drew

With Warne Marsh

- Jazz Exchange Vol. 1 (Storyville, 1975 [1976])
- Live at the Montmartre Club (Storyville, 1975 [1983]) – with Lee Konitz

With Jackie McLean

- Live at Montmartre (SteepleChase, 1972)
- Ode to Super (SteepleChase, 1973) – with Gary Bartz
- A Ghetto Lullaby (SteepleChase, 1974)
- The Meeting (SteepleChase, 1974) – with Dexter Gordon
- The Source (SteepleChase, 1974) – with Dexter Gordon

With Palle Mikkelborg

- The Mysterious Corona (Debut, 1967) – with Radiojazzgruppen
- Ashoka Suite/Guadiana/Concert (Dedicated to Torolf Mølgaard) (Metronome, 1970)

With The Savage Rose

- The Savage Rose (Polydor, 1968)
- In the Plain (Polydor, 1968)
- Travelin' (Polydor, 1969)
- Your Daily Gift (Gregar, 1970)
- Refugee (Gregar, 1971)
- Babylon (Polydor, 1972)
- Dødens triumf (Polydor, 1972)

With Archie Shepp

- The House I Live In (SteepleChase, 1963 [1980]) – with Lars Gullin
- Frankfurt Workshop '78: Tenor Saxes (Circle, 1978 [1985]) – with George Adams, Heinz Sauer
- Devil Blues (Circle, 1978 [1986])

With Sahib Shihab

- Sahib's Jazz Party (Debut, 1963)
- Sahib Shihab and The Danish Radio Jazz Group (Oktav, 1965)

With Stuff Smith

- Live at the Montmartre (Storyville, 1965 [1988])
- Swingin' Stuff (EmArcy, 1965)
- Violin Summit (SABA, 1967) – with Stéphane Grappelli, Svend Asmussen, Jean-Luc Ponty

With Ben Webster

- Intimate! (Fontana, 1965)
- Blue Light (Polydor, 1966)
- Duke's in Bed! (Black Lion, 1969)
- Stormy Weather (Polydor, 1970) – with Kenny Drew
- My Man: Live at Montmartre 1973 (SteepleChase, 1973)
- Saturday Night at the Montmartre (Black Lion, 1974)
- Atmosphere for Lovers and Thieves (Black Lion, 1976)
- Midnight at the Montmartre (Black Lion, 1977)
- Sunday Morning at the Montmartre (Black Lion, 1977)

With others

- Hacke Björkstens septett: I lur och dur (Megafon, 1972)
- Bob Brookmeyer: Holiday (Challenge, 1981)
- Birgit Brüel: Dame i Danmark (Metronome, 1967)
- Eddie "Lockjaw" Davis: Swingin' Till the Girls Come Home (SteepleChase, 1976)
- Wild Bill Davison with Kansas City Stompers: Wild Bill Davison in Copenhagen (CBS, 1974) – with Sanne Salomonsen
- Champion Jack Dupree: The Blues of Champion Jack Dupree (Storyville, 1965)
- Herb Geller: Rhyme and Reason (Atlantic, 1975) – with Mark Murphy, Earl Jordan
- Lars Graugaard: Smile (Skylight, 1986) – with Jukka Tolonen, Bo Stief
- Al Grey and Jesper Thilo Quintet: Al Grey & Jesper Thilo Quintet (Storyville, 1987)
- Bent Jædig: Danish Jazzman 1967 (Debut, 1967)
- Steve Kuhn, Bengt Hallberg, Monica Zetterlund, Sveriges Radios Jazzgrupp: Chicken Feathers (SR, 1972)
- Ken McIntyre: Hindsight (SteepleChase, 1974)
- The Radio Jazz Group: The Radio Jazz Group (Debut, 1965)
- Zoot Sims and Kenny Drew Trio: Live in Denmark (Vantage, 1978 [1990])
- Thorgeir Stubø: Flight (Hot Club, 1985)
- Toots Thielemans: Slow Motion (CBS, 1978)
- Radka Toneff: Live in Hamburg (Odin, 1981 [1992])

== Gallery ==
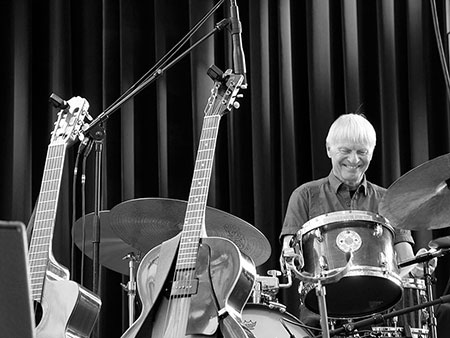

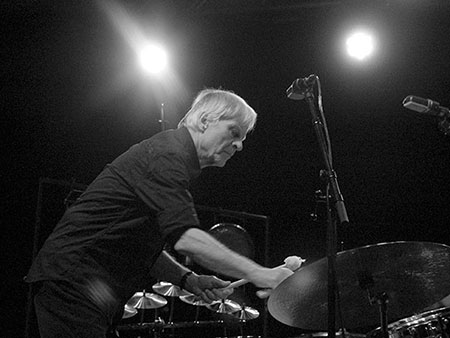

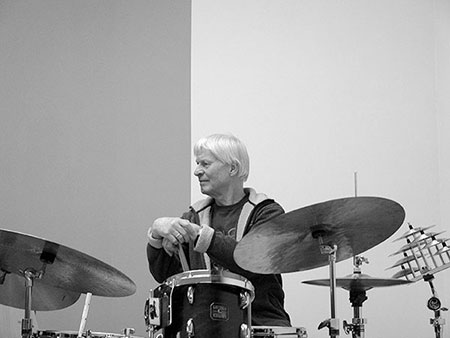

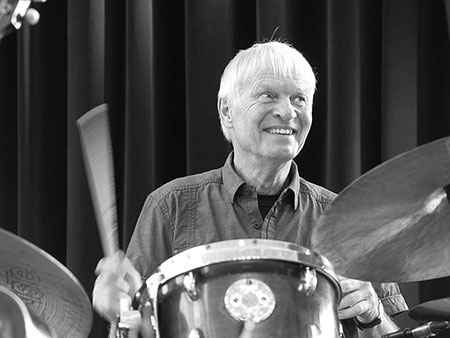
