= Ladybird (Dexter Gordon album) =

Live album by Dexter Gordon
- Released: February 15, 2005
- Recorded: August 19, 1965
- Venues: Jazzhus Montmartre, Copenhagen, Denmark
- Genre: Jazz
- Length: 48:13
- Labels: SteepleChase; SCCD-36035
- Producer: Nils Winther

Dexter Gordon chronology
Heartaches (1965)	Ladybird (2005)	Setting the Pace (1965)

Ladybird is a live album by American saxophonist Dexter Gordon recorded at the Jazzhus Montmartre in Copenhagen, Denmark in 1965 by Danmarks Radio and released on the SteepleChase label in 2005. The album features Gordon's regular quartet with trumpeter Donald Byrd.

== Critical reception ==
Professional ratings
Review scores
Source	Rating
All About Jazz	3.5/5 stars
The Penguin Guide to Jazz Recordings	3/4 stars

All About Jazz reviewer Derek Taylor stated "The trumpeter's presence and the high degree of rapport shared by the rhythm section make this date one of note. Coupled with a tune choice that strays dexterously in more challenging directions than the band's usual diet of bop standards, it's a welcome program that finds Gordon in a limber and exploratory mode. Foibles in fidelity aside, Dex aficionados will be sold on the disc's face value. But casual listeners will probably also be pleasantly surprised by the caliber of this classic conclave.".

== Track listing ==
1. "Ladybird" (Tadd Dameron) – 20:11
2. "So What" (Miles Davis) – 18:08
3. "Who Can I Turn To?" (Anthony Newley, Leslie Bricusse) – 5:31
4. "Blues By Five" (Davis) – 4:13

== Personnel ==
- Dexter Gordon – tenor saxophone
- Donald Byrd – trumpet
- Kenny Drew – piano
- Niels-Henning Ørsted Pedersen – bass
- Alex Riel – drums
