= Love for Sale (Dexter Gordon album) =

Live album by Dexter Gordon Quartet
- Released: 1982
- Recorded: July 23, 1964
- Venue: Jazzhus Montmartre, Copenhagen, Denmark
- Genre: Jazz
- Length: 51:52
- Label: SteepleChase; SCC-6018
- Producer: Nils Winther

Dexter Gordon chronology
I Want More (1964)	Love for Sale (1982)	It's You or No One (1964)

Love for Sale (subtitled Dexter in Radioland Vol. 5) is a live album by American saxophonist Dexter Gordon recorded at the Jazzhus Montmartre in Copenhagen, Denmark in 1964 by Danmarks Radio and released on the SteepleChase label in 1979.

== Critical reception ==
Professional ratings
Review scores
Source	Rating
AllMusic	4/5 stars
The Penguin Guide to Jazz Recordings	3/4 stars

AllMusic critic Scott Yanow stated "It's recommended, as are all of the releases in this valuable 'Dexter in Radioland' series".

== Track listing ==
All compositions by Dexter Gordon except where noted.

1. Introduction by Dexter Gordon – 1:28
2. "Love for Sale" (Cole Porter) – 13:52
3. "I Guess I'll Hang My Tears Out to Dry" (Jule Styne, Sammy Cahn) – 9:54
4. "Big Fat Butterfly" (Unknown) – 7:01
5. "Soul Sister" – 9:30
6. "Cherokee" (Ray Noble) – 10:01

== Personnel ==
- Dexter Gordon – tenor saxophone, vocals
- Tete Montoliu – piano
- Niels-Henning Ørsted Pedersen – bass
- Alex Riel – drums
