= King Neptune (album) =

Live album by Dexter Gordon Quartet
- Released: 1979
- Recorded: June 25, 1964
- Venue: Jazzhus Montmartre, Copenhagen, Denmark
- Genre: Jazz
- Length: 51:01
- Label: SteepleChase; SCC-6012
- Producer: Nils Winther

Dexter Gordon chronology
Cheese Cake (1964)	King Neptune (1979)	I Want More (1964)

King Neptune (subtitled Dexter in Radioland Vol. 3) is a live album by American saxophonist Dexter Gordon recorded at the Jazzhus Montmartre in Copenhagen, Denmark in 1964 by Danmarks Radio and released on the SteepleChase label in 1979.

== Critical reception ==
Professional ratings
Review scores
Source	Rating
AllMusic	4/5 stars
The Penguin Guide to Jazz Recordings	3/4 stars

AllMusic critic Scott Yanow stated "All of the releases in this valuable Dexter in Radioland series are recommended".

== Track listing ==
All compositions by Dexter Gordon except where noted.

1. Introduction by Dexter Gordon – 1:21
2. "King Neptune" – 12:23
3. "Satin Doll" (Duke Ellington, Billy Strayhorn, Johnny Mercer) – 12:29
4. "Body and Soul" (Johnny Green, Frank Eyton, Edward Heyman, Robert Sour) – 10:05
5. "I Want to Blow Now" (Bennie Green) – 14:39

== Personnel ==
- Dexter Gordon – tenor saxophone, vocals
- Tete Montoliu – piano
- Benny Nielsen – bass
- Alex Riel – drums
