= Clubhouse (album) =

Studio album by Dexter Gordon
- Released: 1979
- Recorded: May 27, 1965
- Studio: Van Gelder Studio, Englewood Cliffs, NJ
- Genre: Bebop
- Length: 39:14
- Label: Blue Note
- Producer: Alfred Lion

Dexter Gordon chronology
Billie's Bounce (1964)	Clubhouse (1979)	Gettin' Around (1965)

Alternative cover
- 1990 CD reissue

Alternative cover
- 2007 CD reissue

Clubhouse is an album by American jazz saxophonist Dexter Gordon. It was recorded in 1965, but not released until 1979 by Blue Note Records.

== Critical reception ==
Professional ratings
Review scores
Source	Rating
AllMusic	3/5 stars
DownBeat	4/5 stars
The Penguin Guide to Jazz Recordings	2.5/4 stars
The Rolling Stone Jazz Record Guide	4/5 stars

Robert Christgau of The Village Voice called Clubhouse "superb" and "mature late bebop". AllMusic's Scott Yanow stated, "It is excellent music if not quite essential".

DownBeat assigned the album 4 stars. Reviewer Arthur Moorhead wrote, "The playing throughout is uniformly high, even inspired, but the most striking aspect of this date is the remarkable balance of material, the polished presentation of an array of carefully selected tunes".

== Track listing ==
All compositions by Dexter Gordon, except where noted.

1. "Hanky Panky" – 6:32
2. "I'm a Fool to Want You" (Joel Herron, Frank Sinatra, Jack Wolf) – 6:43
3. "Devilette" (Ben Tucker) – 7:05
4. "Clubhouse" – 7:33
5. "Lady Iris B." (Rudy Stevenson) – 5:41
6. "Jodi" – 5:40

== Personnel ==
- Dexter Gordon – tenor saxophone
- Freddie Hubbard – trumpet (tracks 1–5)
- Barry Harris – piano
- Bob Cranshaw – bass (tracks 1, 2, 4–6)
- Ben Tucker – bass (track 3)
- Billy Higgins – drums
