= Heartaches (Dexter Gordon album) =

Live album by Dexter Gordon
- Released: 2004
- Recorded: June 24, 1965
- Venue: Jazzhus Montmartre, Copenhagen, Denmark
- Genre: Jazz
- Length: 47:25
- Label: SteepleChase; SCCD-36034
- Producer: Nils Winther

Dexter Gordon chronology
Misty (1965)	Heartaches (2004)	Ladybird (1965)

Heartaches is a live album by American saxophonist Dexter Gordon recorded at the Jazzhus Montmartre in Copenhagen, Denmark in 1965 by Danmarks Radio and released on the SteepleChase label in 2005.

== Critical reception ==
Professional ratings
Review scores
Source	Rating
AllMusic	3/5 stars
All About Jazz	3/5 stars
The Penguin Guide to Jazz Recordings	3/4 stars

AllMusic critic Thom Jurek stated "The recording quality can be a tiny bit iffy at times, but the performance is stellar and more than makes up for the few rough spots in the session. Recommended". All About Jazz reviewer Derek Taylor stated "While this is an enjoyable snapshot from the saxophonist's fecund middle period as an expatriate jazz icon enjoying all the amenities commensurate with his status, there isn't much to push this album beyond the body of song already available".

== Track listing ==
1. "Heartaches" (Al Hoffman, John Klenner) – 14:15
2. "Devilette" (Ben Tucker) – 12:26
3. "You've Changed" (Bill Carey, Carl T. Fischer) – 10:19
4. Introduction – 0:58
5. "So What" (Miles Davis) – 9:43

== Personnel ==
- Dexter Gordon – tenor saxophone
- Kenny Drew – piano
- Niels-Henning Ørsted Pedersen – bass
- Alex Riel – drums
