= First Set =

Live album by Cedar Walton Quartet
- Released: 1978
- Recorded: October 1, 1977
- Venues: Jazzhus Montmartre, Copenhagen, Denmark
- Genre: Jazz
- Length: 44:22
- Labels: SteepleChase; SCS-1085
- Producer: Nils Winther

Cedar Walton chronology
Eastern Rebellion 2 (1977)	First Set (1978)	Second Set (1979)

First Set is a live album by pianist Cedar Walton recorded in Denmark in 1977 and released on the Danish SteepleChase label.

== Reception ==
Professional ratings
Review scores
Source	Rating
Allmusic	3/5 stars
The Penguin Guide to Jazz	3.5/4 stars

Allmusic awarded the album 3 stars calling it "a fine recording – the piano sounds excellent, the audience is felt but not heard, and the mix is full and warm". The Penguin Guide to Jazz praised the dynamism of the performance of "Off Minor".

== Track listing ==
All compositions by Cedar Walton except where noted.

1. Introduction - 0:48
2. "Off Minor" (Thelonious Monk) - 11:27
3. "For All We Know" (J. Fred Coots, Sam M. Lewis) - 8:02
4. Introduction - 0:08
5. "Holy Land" - 7:09
6. "I'm Not So Sure" - 8:53
7. "Ojos de Rojo" - 7:56

== Personnel ==
- Cedar Walton - piano
- Bob Berg - tenor saxophone
- Sam Jones - bass
- Billy Higgins - drums
