= Liseleje =

- Town
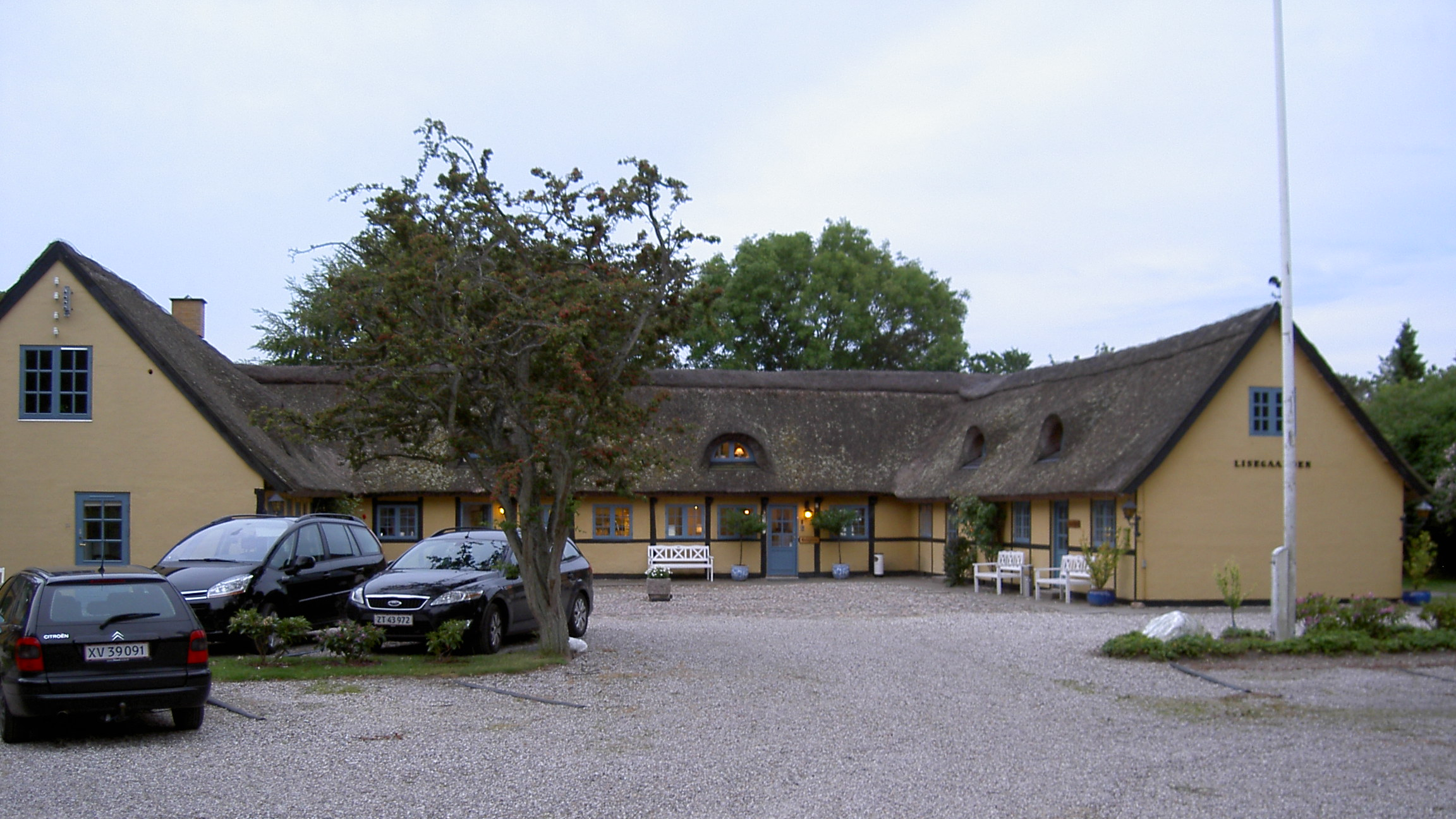
- Lisegården

- Location within Denmark Location within Capital Region
- Coordinates: 56°0′20″N 11°59′11″E
- Country: Denmark
- Region: Capital Region
- Municipality: Halsnæs

Area
  - Urban: 6 km^{2} (2.3 sq mi)

Population (2026)
  - Urban: 2,390
  - Urban density: 400/km^{2} (1,000/sq mi)
- Time zone: UTC+1 (GMT)
- Postal code: 3360 Liseleje

Liseleje is a former fishing village and popular tourist resort in Halsnæs Municipality, North Zealand, some 60 kilometres northwest of Copenhagen, Denmark. The original village is surrounded by extensive areas of summerhouses. It has merged with neighbouring Asserbo, forming an urban area with a combined population of 2,390 (1 January 2026).

== Geography ==
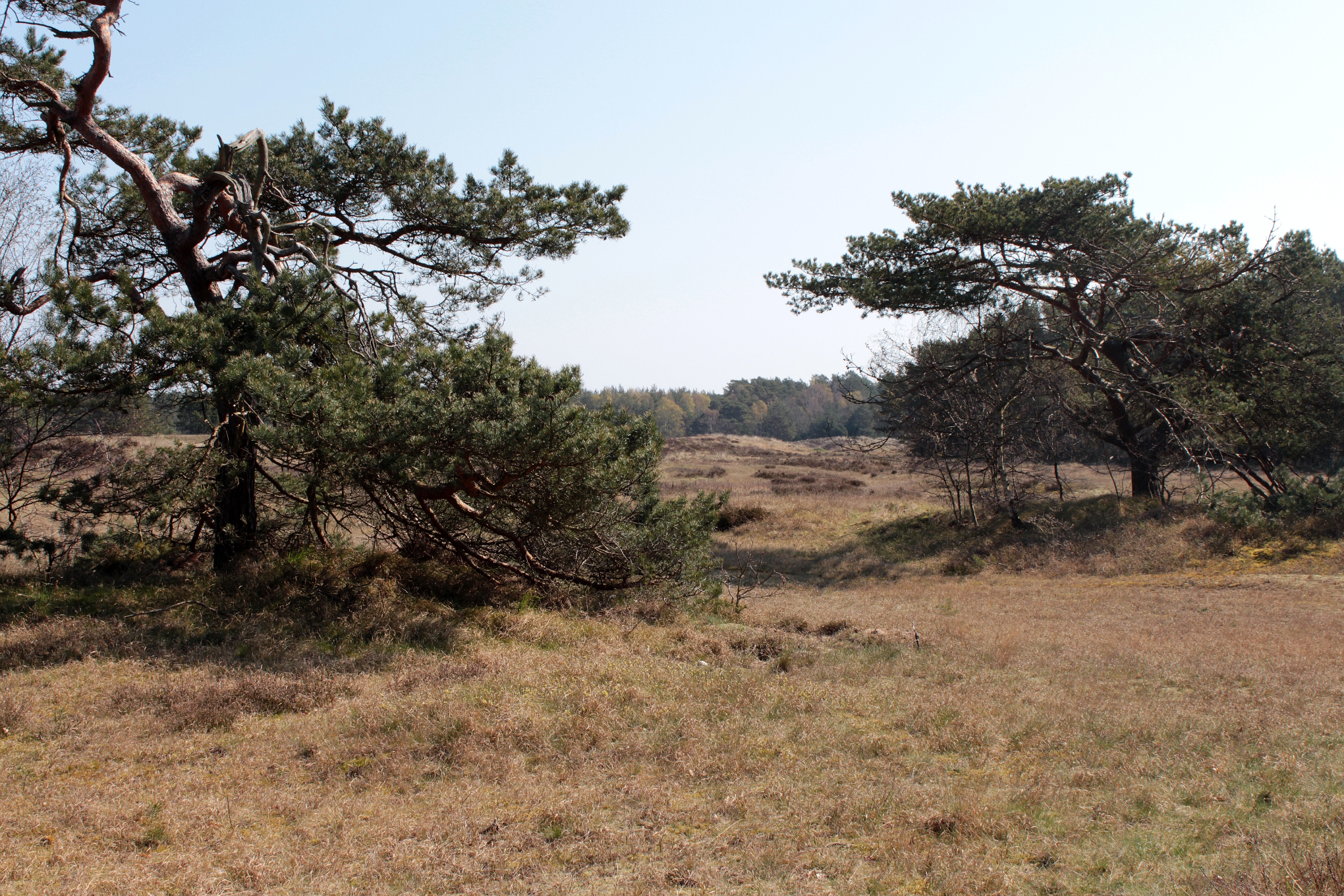
Melby Overdrev

Liseleje is located 7 km north of Frederiksværk, 70 km from Copenhagen, 50 km from Roskilde, 44 km from Helsingør and 27 km from Hillerød.

Liseleje Plantage, a wooded area planted in the late 19th century to combat drifting sand, is located to the east of the town. It is separated from Asserbo Plantage by Melby Overdrev, an open area which was protected in 1930. The three area adjoin Tisvilde Hegn, forming one of the largest forests in Denmark.

== History ==
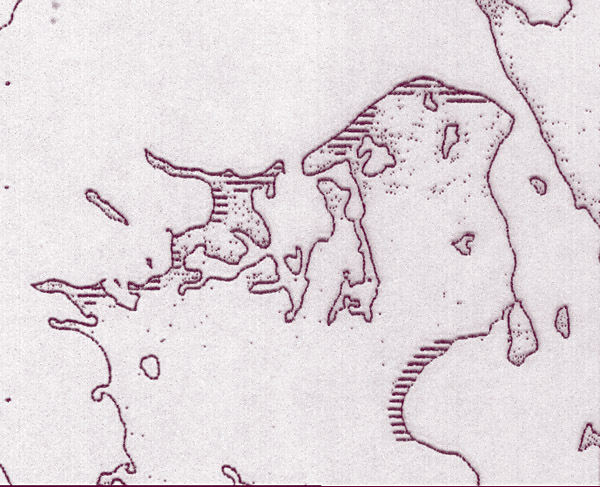
Areas suffering from sand drift as seen on a map from the 18th century

The entire area belonged to Arresødal Manor which was created by Major General Johan Frederik Classen on 1773. Classen founded the fishing village in 1784 with the aim of providing food for the workers at his gunpowder mill at Frederiksværk. It was located in the outskirts of a large area which had been covered by drifting sand. The village originally consisted of just four families who were attracted to the site by freedom of taxes. The village was named after Classen's stepdaughter Elisabeth (Lise).

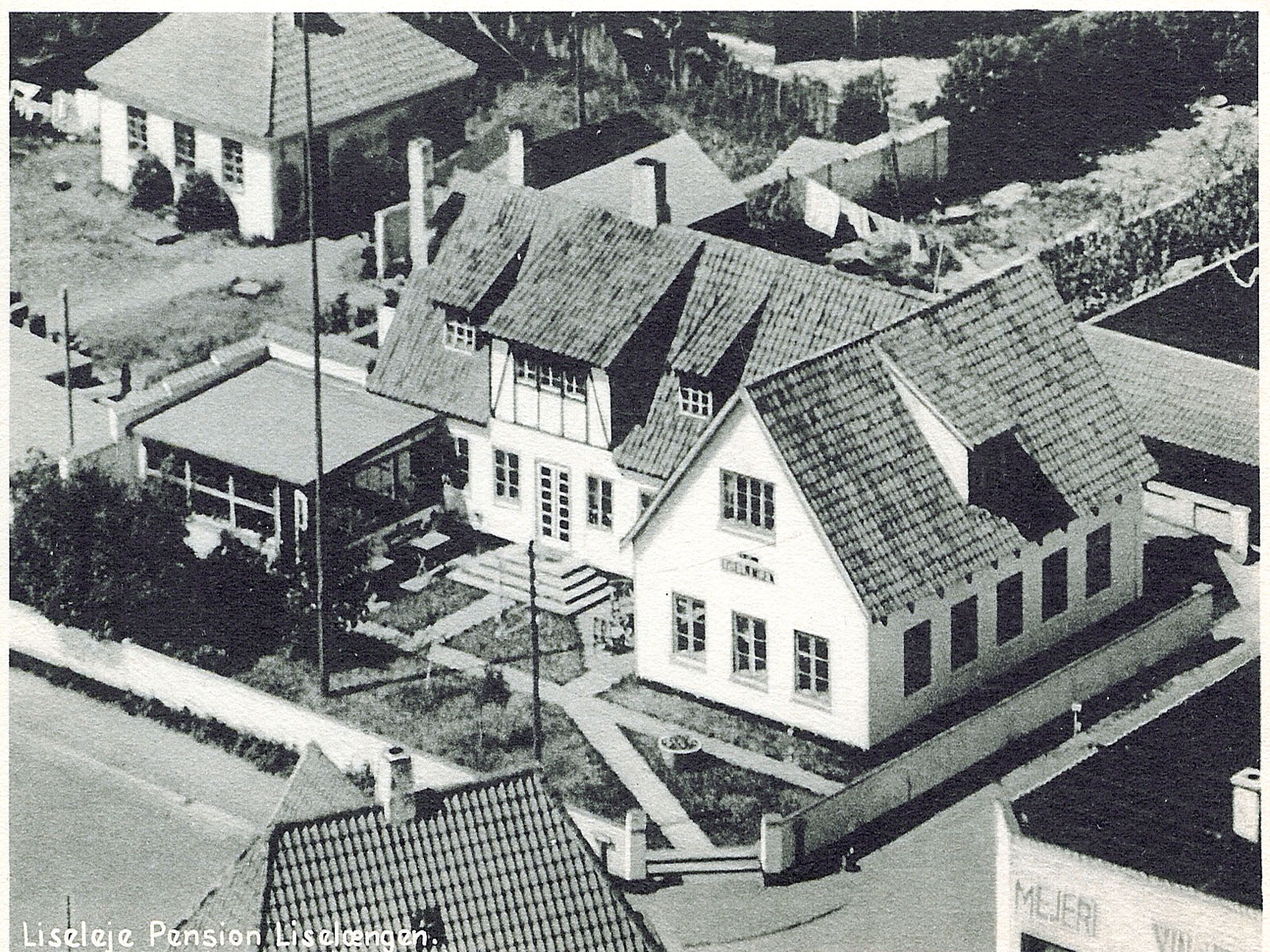
Liselængen, a motel opened in 1936

Unlike in many of its neighbouring fishing communities, a proper harbour was never built and commercial fishing ended in the 1960s. Tourism began to develop in the early 1930s when the first boarding houses opened and many summer houses were built.

== Today ==
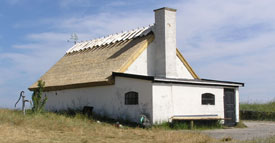
The ice house

Liseleje still features some of the original, thatched fishermen's houses as well as many early summerhouses. Liselængen, which still offers accommodation, has been a pension (Danish: Pensionat) since 1936.

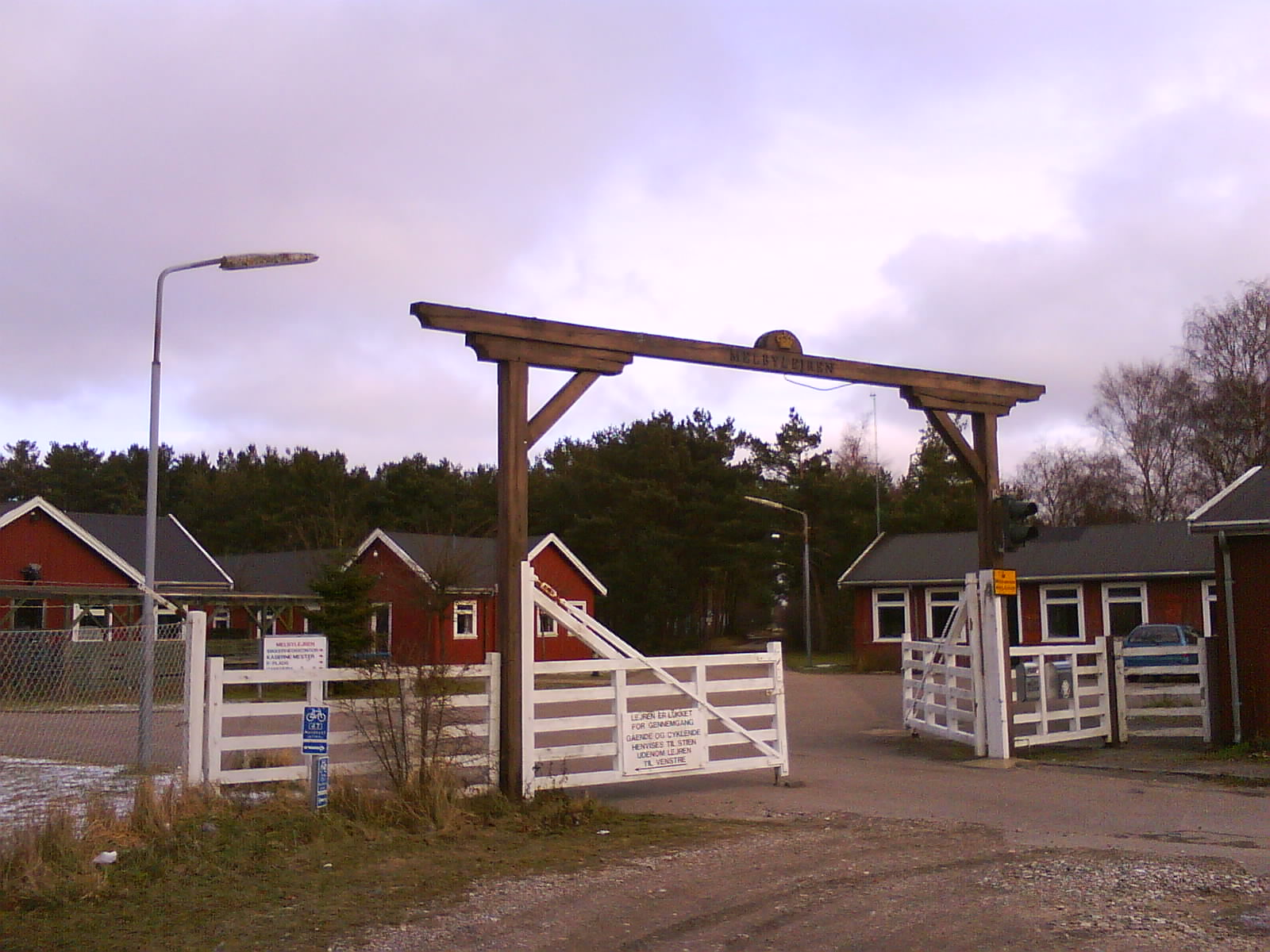
Melbylejren's main entrance

The former ice house at the end of Classensvej is from 1901 and was used by the fishermen to store the ice which made it possible to export their fish to Germany after the railway to Frederiksværk had opened. Lisegården, a three-winged, thatched farmhouse, is now used as a conference venue.

Melbylejren, a former military installation and training ground established in 1886, is located in Asserbo. The buildings are now used as a venue for events and recreational activities.

== Notable people ==
- Alex Riel (1940-2024), a Danish jazz and rock drummer, lived in Liseleje from 2005 until his death in june 2024
- Ane Riel (born 1971), a Danish author and writer, has lived in Liseleje since 2005

=== Vacation homes ===
- Aage Langeland-Mathiesen (1868 – 1933 in Liseleje), a Danish architect.
- Jørgen Leschly Sørensen (1922-1999) a Danish footballer
- Karl Aage Præst (1922-2011), a Danish football player
- John Hansen (1924-1990), a Danish footballer

== See also ==
- Melby, Halsnæs Municipality
