= Ane Riel =

Danish author (born 1971)

- Born: Ane Brahm Lauritsen; 25 September 1971 (age 54); Aarhus, Denmark
- Occupations: Author, novelist
- Spouse: Alex Riel (2002–2024)
- Writing career
- Language: Translated into English, Spanish, French, Italian, Dutch, German, Chinese, Japanese, Korean, Polish, Swedish, Norwegian, Czech, Hungarian etc.
- Period: 2013–present
- Genre: Literary fiction
- Notable works: Resin, Beast
- Website: aneriel.dk

Ane Riel (born 25 September 1971) is a Danish novelist.

== Career ==
Riel is the author of four novels. Her fourth novel, Clockwork, is forthcoming by Lindhardt og Ringhof in June 2021. Her first three novels earned her seven awards and twelve nominations both in Denmark and abroad.

- She debuted as a novelist with The Butcher of Liseleje (2013) that won a debut award in Denmark and was sold to Germany and Norway.
- Her popular literary breakthrough came with her second novel Resin (2015). The novel has been sold to 26 countries and also been adapted into a feature film in 2019 starring Sofie Gråbøl (The Killing) and Peter Plaugborg (Winter Brothers). The novel has won several national and international awards (se list below), including the Glass Key in 2016, claiming its spot as that year's best Nordic suspense novel.
- Ane Riel's third literary novel, Beast – an epic story with references to John Steinbeck's work – came out in Denmark in the Fall of 2019. Beast has so far been sold to six countries including Italy, Germany and The Netherlands.
- Clockwork will be published in Denmark on 3 June 2021.

Riel's novels were all written as literary novels and have been published as such in Denmark. However, the first two share a peculiarity in that they were also welcomed into the crime genre. In fact Resin won the four most important crime awards in Scandinavia which is unusual for a book that wasn't meant to belong in that genre.

On their motivation for choosing Resin as the best Nordic thriller of 2016 the jury of The Glass Key Award said: "Resin is written with a mischievous and whimsical élan, as well as solidarity with its characters, especially the oddballs and the anti-socials. There is actually a lot of amusement in this tragic story. Resin is written in the fertile borderland between strict genre and originality, the beloved cliché and the new code. Or what Umberto Eco calls the good balance in all good literature; the known is what is already seen and the shocking is what is unknown. It is in this borderland that the best thrillers are and where prizes are won."

Ane Riel herself regards her novels to be works of literary fiction.

In 2016 she was also awarded the Niels Matthiasen Memorial Grant by the Ministry of Culture for her authorship thus far. The Niels Matthiasen committee called Ane Riel: "an author of unique talent, extraordinary courage and a rare imagination. Along with her command of the subtleties of language, she has positioned herself at the forefront of her genre in record time. She is clearly not a 'one hit wonder'. With an imagination bordering on the grotesque and her exceptional writing style, she has forged a universe entirely of her own making."

Ane Riel's Danish publisher is Lindhardt and Ringhof. Her first two novels from 2013 and 2015 were originally published by Tiderne Skifter (in 2019 they were republished by Lindhardt and Ringhof).

== Novels ==
- 2021: Clockwork (Urværk)
- 2019: Beast (Bæst)
- 2015: Resin (Harpiks) – the English edition was published by Transworld in 2018
- 2013: The Butcher of Liseleje (Slagteren i Liseleje)

== Awards and nominations ==
=== Awards ===
- 2019. The ThrillZone Award (The Netherlands) – for Resin
- 2017. The Golden Crowbar (Sweden) – for Resin
- 2017. The Golden Bullet (Norway) – for Resin
- 2016. The Glass Key (Scandinavia) – for Resin
- 2016. The Niels Matthiasen Memorial Grant (Denmark) – for the authorship
- 2016. The Harald Mogensen Award (Denmark)– for Resin
- 2014. Det Danske Kriminalakademis debutantpris (Denmark) – for The Butcher of Liseleje

=== Nominations ===
- 2020. Nominated for the Dublin International Literary Awards– for Resin
- 2020. Nominated for The ThrillZone Award – for Beast
- 2020. Nominated for The Martha Award – for Beast
- 2019. Shortlisted for The Petrona Award – for Resin
- 2016. Finalist for The Danish Broadcasting Company's Best Novel Award – for Resin
- 2016. Nominated for The Readers' Best Novel Award – Resin

== Personal life ==
Riel grew up in a suburb of Aarhus, Denmark, as the daughter of a lawyer and a children's book illustrator. In 1990 she graduated from Marselisborg Gymnasium. After moving to Copenhagen she worked part time for several years at the Storm P. Museum, a museum dedicated to the life and work of Robert Storm Petersen (1882-1949), a Danish artist known for his comic strips and satirical work. Between 1995 and 2005 she published a total of nine children's books, among these schoolbooks about art, architecture and Storm P, as well as a few works of fiction (mostly published under her maiden name). During this time, she was also assisting and traveling with her partner Alex Riel, one of the most significant and influential jazz drummers in Europe. The couple married in 2002. Ane and Alex live in the small village of Liseleje, Denmark. Alex died in his home on June 9, 2024.

Since 2013, Riel has worked solely as a novelist.
