= Straight Ahead (Eddie "Lockjaw" Davis album) =

Studio album by Eddie "Lockjaw" Davis with the Tommy Flanagan Trio
- Released: 1976
- Recorded: May 3, 1976
- Studio: RCA Studios, Los Angeles, CA
- Genre: Jazz
- Length: 44:59
- Label: Pablo; 2310-778
- Producer: Norman Granz

Eddie "Lockjaw" Davis chronology
Swingin' Till the Girls Come Home (1976)	Straight Ahead (1976)	Lockjaw with Sweets (1976)

Straight Ahead is an album by American jazz saxophonist Eddie "Lockjaw" Davis with the Tommy Flanagan Trio recorded in 1976 and released on the Pablo label.

== Critical reception ==
Professional ratings
Review scores
Source	Rating
Allmusic	3/5 stars
The Penguin Guide to Jazz Recordings	3/4 stars

Allmusic stated "A perfect example of Eddie "Lockjaw" Davis' playing, this superior quartet set features the tough-toned tenor swinging hard on standards, showing his warmth on ballads, and coming up with inventive ideas within the swing/bop tradition".

== Track listing ==
1. "Lover" (Richard Rodgers, Lorenz Hart) – 4:41
2. "Wave" (Antônio Carlos Jobim) – 5:20
3. "On a Clear Day (You Can See Forever)" (Burton Lane, Alan Jay Lerner) – 4:05
4. "The Chef" (Eddie "Lockjaw" Davis) – 3:52
5. "Gigi" (Frederick Loewe, Lerner) – 4:22
6. "Last Train from Overbrook" (James Moody) – 6:19
7. "The Good Life" (Sacha Distel, Jack Reardon) – 5:08
8. "I'll Never Be the Same" (Matty Malneck, Frank Signorelli, Gus Kahn) – 5:13
9. "Watch What Happens" (Michel Legrand) – 5:59

== Personnel ==
- Eddie "Lockjaw" Davis – tenor saxophone
- Tommy Flanagan – piano
- Keter Betts – bass
- Bobby Durham – drums
