= Jaws Strikes Again =

1976 album by American jazz saxophonist Eddie Lockjaw Davis

Studio album by Eddie "Lockjaw" Davis
- Released: 1976
- Recorded: January 21, 1976
- Studio: Barclay Studio, Paris, France
- Genre: Jazz
- Label: Black and Blue; 33.101
- Producer: Disques Black and Blue SARL

Eddie "Lockjaw" Davis chronology
| Chewin' the Fat (1975) | Jaws Strikes Again (1976) | Swingin' Till the Girls Come Home (1976) |

Jaws Strikes Again is an album by American jazz saxophonist Eddie "Lockjaw" Davis recorded in Paris in 1976 and released on the French Black and Blue label.

Professional ratings
Review scores
| Source | Rating |
|---|---|
| Allmusic | 3/5 stars |
| The Penguin Guide to Jazz Recordings | 2.5/4 stars |

== Track listing ==
1. "Don't Worry 'bout Me" (Rube Bloom, Ted Koehler) – 5:38
2. "The Man I Love" (George Gershwin, Ira Gershwin) – 5:17
3. "Light and Lovely" (Eddie "Lockjaw" Davis) – 8:45
4. "Stompin' at the Savoy" (Edgar Sampson, Benny Goodman, Andy Razaf, Chick Webb) – 4:30
5. "When Sunny Gets Blue" (Marvin Fisher, Jack Segal) – 4:09
6. "Blue and Sentimental" (Count Basie, Mack David, Jerry Livingston) – 3:26
7. "Jumpin' with Symphony Sid" (Lester Young) – 6:09

== Personnel ==
- Eddie "Lockjaw" Davis – tenor saxophone
- Wild Bill Davis – organ
- Billy Butler – guitar
- Oliver Jackson – drums
