= Wee Dot =

Live album by Dexter Gordon
- Released: 2003
- Recorded: June 10, 1965
- Venue: Jazzhus Montmartre, Copenhagen, Denmark
- Genre: Jazz
- Length: 50:48
- Label: SteepleChase; SCCD-36031
- Producer: Nils Winther

Dexter Gordon chronology
| Gettin' Around (1965) | Wee Dot (2003) | Loose Walk (1965) |

Wee Dot is a live album by American saxophonist Dexter Gordon recorded at the Jazzhus Montmartre in Copenhagen, Denmark in 1965 by Danmarks Radio and released on the SteepleChase label in 2003.

== Critical reception ==
Professional ratings
Review scores
| Source | Rating |
|---|---|
| AllMusic | 3/5 stars |
| The Penguin Guide to Jazz Recordings | 2.5/4 stars |

AllMusic critic Thom Jurek stated "Gordon introduces each tune with his gracious, hipster vernacular and trademark dry elegance. There are only four tunes on the set, but they are all extended workouts. The closer, an updated, finger-popping redo of "Second Balcony Jump" (recorded by the saxophonist during his Blue Note years) is surely the finest moment of an already excellent set".

== Track listing ==
1. "Take the "A" Train" (Billy Strayhorn) – 9:35
2. Introduction – 0:33
3. "My Melancholy Baby" (Ernie Burnett, George Norton) – 8:35
4. Introduction – 0:33
5. "What's New?" (Bob Haggart, Johnny Burke) – 11:14
6. Introduction – 0:37
7. "Wee Dot" (J. J. Johnson) – 14:51
8. Introduction – 0:41
9. "Second Balcony Jump" (Billy Eckstine, Gerald Valentine) – 1:48

== Personnel ==
- Dexter Gordon – tenor saxophone
- Atli Bjorn – piano
- Benny Nielsen – bass
- Finn Frederiksen – drums
