= Swingin' Till the Girls Come Home =

Studio album by Eddie "Lockjaw" Davis Quartet
- Released: 1976
- Recorded: March 8, 1976
- Studio: Creative Sound Studio, Copenhagen, Denmark
- Genre: Jazz
- Length: 53:07 CD reissue with bonus tracks
- Label: SteepleChase; SCS 1058
- Producer: Nils Winther

Eddie "Lockjaw" Davis chronology
Jaws Strikes Again (1976)	Swingin' Till the Girls Come Home (1976)	Straight Ahead (1976)

Swingin' Till the Girls Come Home is an album by American jazz saxophonist Eddie "Lockjaw" Davis recorded in Copenhagen in 1976 and released on the Danish SteepleChase label. The album was also released in the U.S. on Inner City Records

== Critical reception ==
Professional ratings
Review scores
Source	Rating
Allmusic	4/5 stars
The Penguin Guide to Jazz Recordings	2.5/4 stars

Allmusic called it "Fun, accessible and mostly hard-swinging straightahead music".

== Track listing ==
1. "Swingin' Till the Girls Come Home" (Oscar Pettiford) – 4:32
2. "Love for Sale" (Cole Porter) – 5:00
3. "Out of Nowhere" (Johnny Green, Edward Heyman) – 5:59
4. "I Don't Stand a Ghost of a Chance With You" (Victor Young, Bing Crosby, Ned Washington) – 4:44
5. "Locks" (Eddie "Lockjaw" Davis) – 6:42
6. "Wave" (Antônio Carlos Jobim) – 6:23
7. "(Back Home Again in) Indiana" (Ballard MacDonald, James F. Hanley) – 3:08
8. "Bye Bye Blackbird" (Ray Henderson, Mort Dixon) – 3:40
9. "I Don't Stand a Ghost of a Chance With You" [alternate take] (Young, Crosby, Washington) – 4:46 Bonus track on CD reissue
10. "Swingin' Till the Girls Come Home" [alternate take] (Pettiford) – 4:37 Bonus track on CD reissue
11. "Bye Bye Blackbird" [alternate take] (Henderson, Dixon) – 3:30 Bonus track on CD reissue

== Personnel ==
- Eddie "Lockjaw" Davis – tenor saxophone
- Thomas Clausen – piano
- Bo Stief – bass
- Alex Riel – drums
