= Ode to Super =

Studio album by Jackie McLean featuring Gary Bartz
- Released: 1973
- Recorded: July 17, 1973
- Venue: Soundtrack Studio in Copenhagen, Denmark
- Genre: Jazz
- Length: 61:15
- Label: SteepleChase; SCS-1009
- Producer: Nils Winther

Jackie McLean chronology
| Altissimo (1973) | Ode to Super (1973) | A Ghetto Lullaby (1973) |

Ode to Super is an album by American saxophonist Jackie McLean featuring Gary Bartz recorded in 1973 and released on the SteepleChase label.

== Reception ==
The Allmusic review by Scott Yanow awarded the album 2½ stars and stated "This matchup between altoists Jackie McLean and Gary Bartz has always been a bit of a disappointment with the solos much stronger than the material ...A more suitable encore by the two greats is long overdue".

Professional ratings
Review scores
| Source | Rating |
|---|---|
| Allmusic | 2.5/5 stars |
| The Rolling Stone Jazz Record Guide | 3/5 stars |
| The Penguin Guide to Jazz Recordings | 2.5/4 stars |

== Track listing ==
1. "Monks Dance" (Gary Bartz) – 6:32
2. "Ode to Super" (Billy Gault) – 8:20
3. "Great Rainstreet Blues" (Jackie McLean) – 10:10
4. "Watercircle" (Thomas Clausen) – 10:50
5. "Watercircle" [Take 6] (Clausen) – 5:37 Bonus track on CD reissue
6. "Red Cross" (Charlie Parker) – 7:45
7. "Red Cross" [Take 1] (Parker) – 12:01 Bonus track on CD reissue

== Personnel ==
- Jackie McLean, Gary Bartz – alto saxophone, vocals
- Thomas Clausen – piano
- Bo Stief – bass
- Alex Riel – drums
