= My Man: Live at Montmartre 1973 =

Live album by Ben Webster
- Released: 1973
- Recorded: January and April 1973
- Venue: Jazzhus Montmartre in Copenhagen, Denmark
- Genre: Jazz
- Length: 51:47
- Label: SteepleChase; SCS-1008
- Producer: Nils Winther

Ben Webster chronology
Gentle Ben (1972)	My Man: Live at Montmartre 1973 (1973)

My Man: Live at Montmartre 1973 is a live album by American saxophonist Ben Webster, recorded at the Jazzhus Montmartre in 1973 and released on the SteepleChase label.

== Reception ==
Professional ratings
Review scores
Source	Rating
AllMusic	3/5 stars
The Penguin Guide to Jazz Recordings	2.5/4 stars
The Rolling Stone Record Guide	4/5 stars

The AllMusic review by Scott Yanow stated: "Just months before his death, the great tenor Ben Webster shows that even with an occasional shortness of breath, he never really declined musically. ...Webster's warm ballad renditions and hard-driving romps are as always quite enjoyable to hear.".

== Track listing ==
1. "Sunday" (Chester Conn, Benny Krueger, Ned Miller, Jule Styne) - 7:55
2. "Willow Weep for Me" (Ann Ronell) - 8:56
3. "Exactly Like You" (Dorothy Fields, Jimmy McHugh) - 8:44
4. "Old Folks" (Dedette Lee Hill, Willard Robison) - 10:06
5. "I Got Rhythm" (George Gershwin, Ira Gershwin) - 8:00
6. "Set Call" (Ben Webster) - 8:06

== Personnel ==
- Ben Webster – tenor saxophone
- Ole Kock Hansen – piano
- Bo Stief – bass
- Alex Riel – drums
