= Melbylejren =

Coordinates: 56.0175°N 11.9922°E

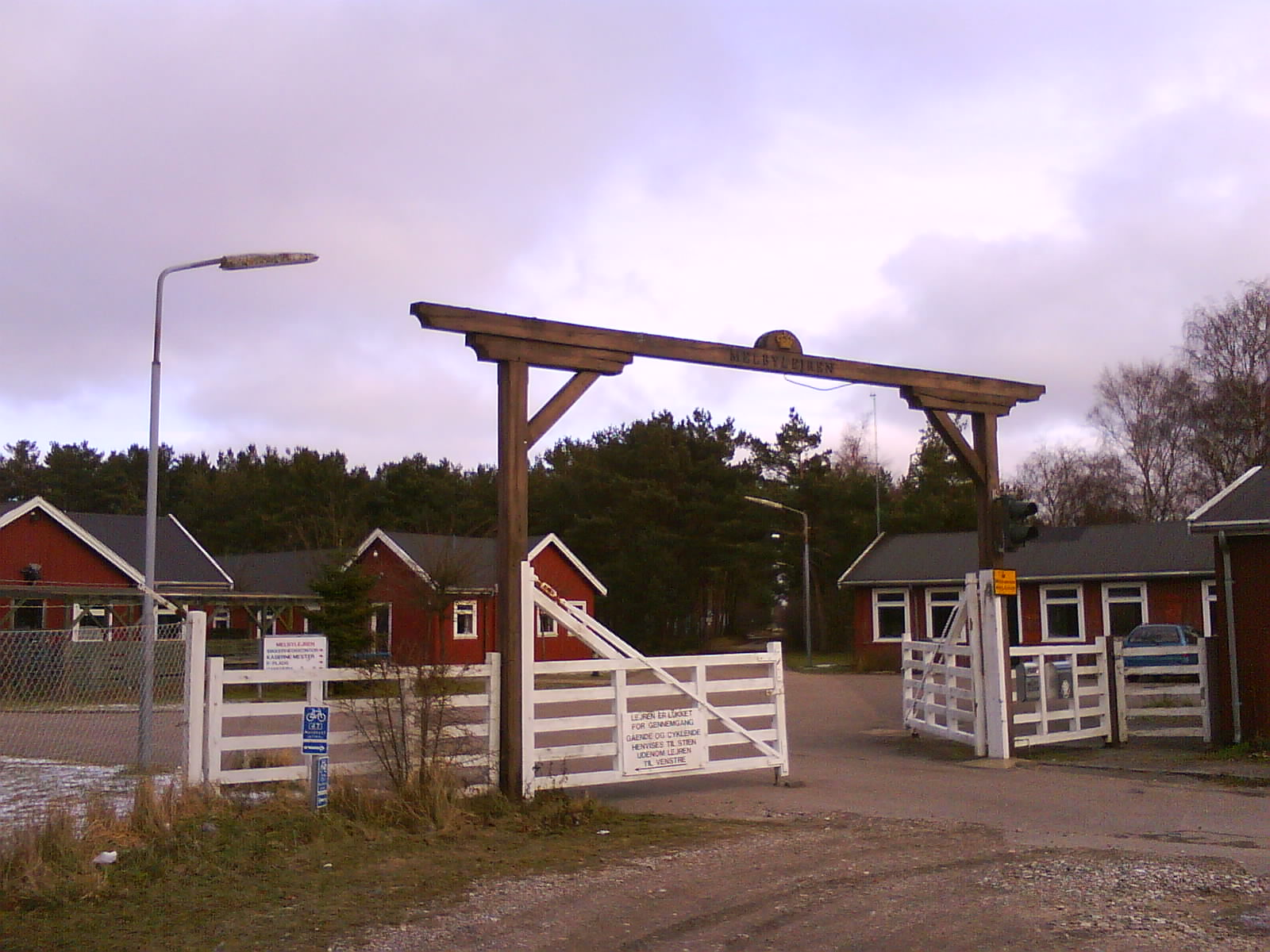
Melbylejren's main entrance

Melbylejren is a former military installation and training ground situated at Liseleje in Halsnæs Municipality, North Zealand, some 60 km north of Copenhagen, Denmark. It was established in 1886 and decommissioned in 2003 and the buildings are now used as a venue for events and recreational activities.

== History ==
The area was turned into a military training ground in 1886 although the first buildings were not built until 1897 and a permanent staff was not stationed at the camp until 1916. The camp was used by the occupying German forces during World War II and for a while used as a military prison camp after the liberation before it was once again turned into a shooting range. It closed in 2003. The buildings are now used for events.
