= Blues à la Suisse =

Live album by Dexter Gordon
- Released: 1974
- Recorded: July 7, 1973
- Venue: Montreux Jazz Festival, Switzerland
- Genre: Jazz
- Label: Prestige; P-10079
- Producer: Orrin Keepnews

Dexter Gordon chronology
All Souls' (1972)	Blues à la Suisse (1974)	The Meeting (1973)

Blues à la Suisse is a live album by American saxophonist Dexter Gordon recorded at the Montreux Jazz Festival in Switzerland in 1973 and released on the Prestige label. The track "Blues à la Suisse" is credited to Gordon on the LP, but the composition is actually John Coltrane's "Some Other Blues" from Coltrane's 1960 Atlantic LP Coltrane Jazz.

== Critical reception ==
Professional ratings
Review scores
Source	Rating
AllMusic	4/5 stars
The Rolling Stone Jazz Record Guide	3/5 stars

AllMusic critic Scott Yanow stated "Tenor-great Dexter Gordon sounds fine on these four extended performances ... The rhythm section (Hampton Hawes on electric piano, electric bassist Bob Cranshaw and drummer Kenny Clarke) is not as attuned to Gordon's music as one would hope (the electronics do not really blend in well), making this a somewhat average (but still fairly enjoyable) bop session".

== Track listing ==
1. "Gingerbread Boy" (Jimmy Heath) – 12:43
2. "Blues à la Suisse" (Dexter Gordon) – 10:26
3. "Some Other Spring" (Arthur Herzog, Jr., Irene Kitchings) – 6:02
4. "Secret Love" (Sammy Fain, Paul Francis Webster) – 14:31

== Personnel ==
- Dexter Gordon – tenor saxophone
- Hampton Hawes – piano, electric piano
- Bob Cranshaw – electric bass
- Kenny Clarke – drums
