= Loose Walk (Dexter Gordon album) =

Live album by Dexter Gordon
- Released: 2003
- Recorded: June 24, 1965
- Venue: Jazzhus Montmartre, Copenhagen, Denmark
- Genre: Jazz
- Length: 47:25
- Label: SteepleChase; SCCD-36032
- Producer: Nils Winther

Dexter Gordon chronology
Wee Dot (1965)	Loose Walk (2003)	Misty (1965)

Loose Walk is a live album by American saxophonist Dexter Gordon recorded at the Jazzhus Montmartre in Copenhagen, Denmark in 1965 by Danmarks Radio and released on the SteepleChase label in 2005.

== Critical reception ==
Professional ratings
Review scores
Source	Rating
The Penguin Guide to Jazz Recordings	3/4 stars

JazzTimes reviewer Chris Kelsey stated "Gordon’s playing is loose and relaxed, bluesy and intense. Drew is superb; NHOP and Riel do their duty. Dex’s idiosyncratic spoken intros to tunes like “I Should Care” and “Come Rain or Come Shine” are charming, and the gritty soulfulness of his playing reminds us just how much we miss the greats of his generation. They don’t make ’em like this anymore".

== Track listing ==
1. "There Will Never Be Another You" (Harry Warren, Mack Gordon) – 13:31
2. Introduction – 0:17
3. "Come Rain or Come Shine" (Harold Arlen, Johnny Mercer) – 14:17
4. Introduction – 0:37
5. "I Should Care" (Axel Stordahl, Sammy Cahn, Paul Weston) – 10:56
6. Introduction – 0:39
7. "Loose Walk" (Sonny Stitt) – 7:08

== Personnel ==
- Dexter Gordon – tenor saxophone
- Kenny Drew – piano
- Niels-Henning Ørsted Pedersen – bass
- Alex Riel – drums
