= Jazzhus Montmartre =

Jazz club in Copenhagen, Denmark

Coordinates: 55.6815°N 12.5817°E

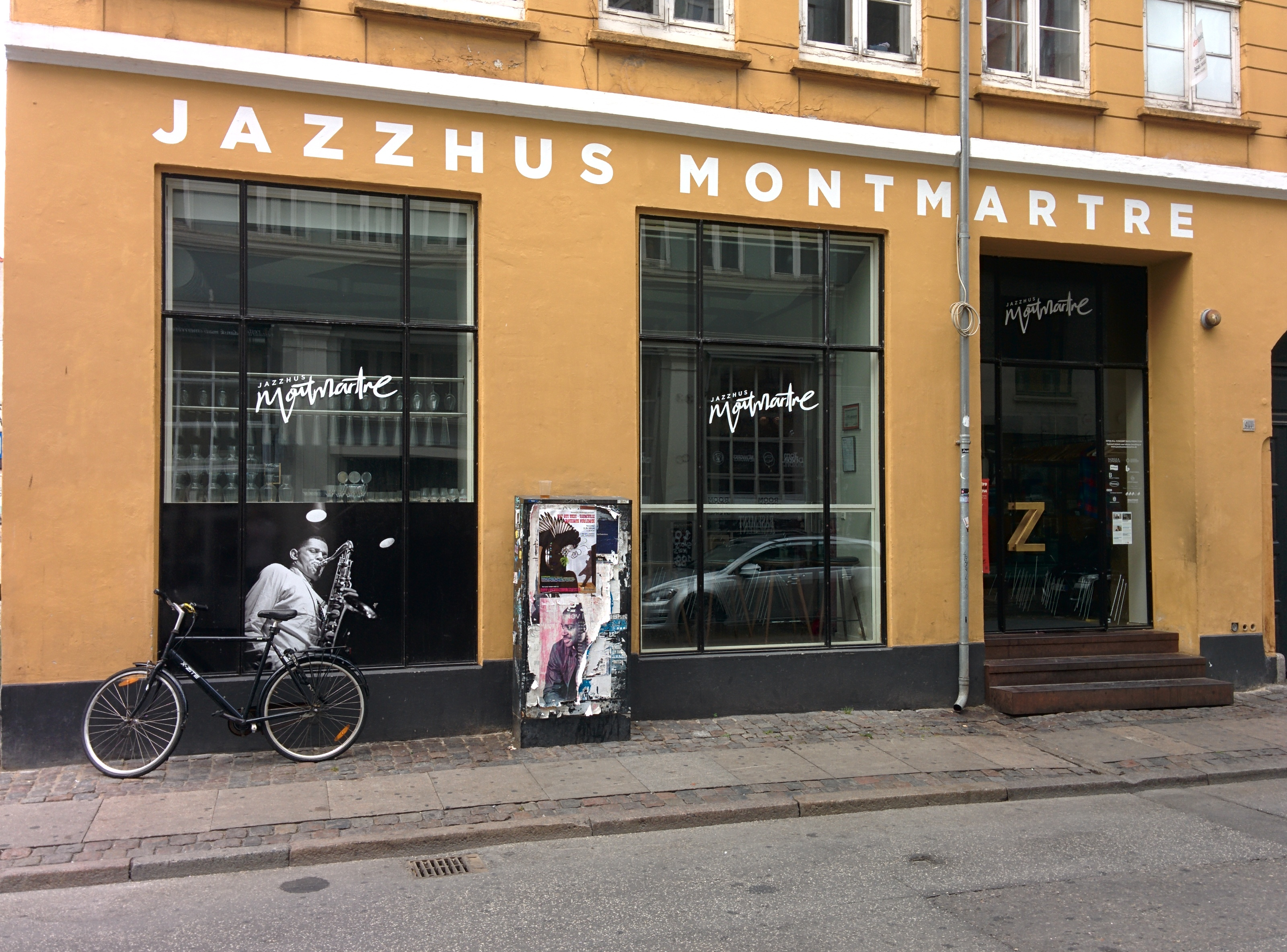
Jazzhus Montmartre, Store Regnegade 19

Jazzhus Montmartre is a jazz club in Copenhagen, Denmark. Many jazz musicians, including Dexter Gordon, Stan Getz, and Chet Baker, have performed there. It is sometimes called Cafe Montmartre. The Montmartre was located first in Dahlerupsgade, then from 1961 on Store Regnegade, and since 1976 at Nørregade 41 before closing down in 1995. In May 2010, it reopened at Store Regnegade 19A by media executive and entrepreneur Rune Bech and jazz pianist Niels Lan Doky, who was later replaced as music director by saxophonist Benjamin Koppel and then jazz publisher Christian Brorsen. In 2016, Swedish jazz pianist Jan Lundgren was appointed artistic director.

== History ==
It was opened in 1959 by Anders Dyrup with a two-week residency by George Lewis. Early in the venue's history, the program was dominated by Dixieland (then very popular in Denmark). Shortly afterwards Stan Getz, who lived from 1958 to 1961 with his Swedish wife in Copenhagen, played regularly in the club. He was followed by other expatriate American jazz musicians, including Dexter Gordon (who lived from 1962 to 1976 in Copenhagen) and Ben Webster (1964–1973, in Copenhagen and Amsterdam).

On New Year's Eve 1961, the Jazzhus Montmartre reopened under the lead of Herluf Kamp-Larsen in new premises in Store Regnegade. The Montmartre developed into one of the main locations for jazz in Europe, for long years with pianist Kenny Drew (who moved to the city in 1964), bassist Niels-Henning Ørsted Pedersen, and drummer Alex Riel as the regular rhythm group accompanying guest musicians. From 1976, the venue was at Nørregade 41 with Kay Sørensen (1938–1988) as owner, while Niels Christensen served as music manager, assisted from 1982 by Lars Thorborg.

From 1976 to 1989, Montmartre established itself as one of the strongest jazz venues in Europe. Besides jazz stars like Miles Davis, Dizzy Gillespie, Stan Getz, Sonny Rollins, Oscar Peterson, Ben Webster, Nancy Wilson, Betty Carter, Elvin Jones, Art Blakey, Brecker Brothers, and many more, Montmartre presented world music artists such as Milton Nascimento, Gilberto Gil, Djavan, Tania Maria, Youssou N'Dour, and King Sunny Adé, as well as funk/soul artists like James Brown, Tower of Power, and Gil Scott-Heron. Local pop and rock artists also saw Montmartre as their home ground, as well as the very popular Natdiskotek (night disco), which attracted youth from all over greater Copenhagen every weekend and also provided the economic foundations for the club's strong jazz profile.

In 1989, Kay Sørensen suddenly died and Montmartre was sold to Eli Pries, who had trouble maintaining the club's traditional mix of art and commercial success. Pop musician Anne Linnet took over the club in 1992, changing the club into a mainly techno music venue, and in 1995 the Montmartre on Nørregade closed its doors. Instead various temporary discothèques under changing names took over the historic location. From 1991, the focus for jazz in Copenhagen shifted to the Copenhagen Jazz House (Niels Hemmingsens Gade 10), which closed in 2017.

Among the other jazz musicians playing on and off at Montmartre were Roland Kirk, Oscar Pettiford, Joe Harris, Buddy Tate, Coleman Hawkins, Don Byas, Bud Powell, Julian "Cannonball" Adderley, Cecil Taylor, Brew Moore, Harold Goldberg, Lucky Thompson, Archie Shepp, Johnny Griffin, Art Taylor, Booker Ervin, Albert Ayler, Dollar Brand (Abdullah Ibrahim), Don Cherry, Rune Gustafsson, Albert "Tootie" Heath, Eli Thompson, Sonny Rollins, Yusef Lateef, George Russell, Teddy Wilson, Paul Bley, Bill Evans, Eddie Gómez, Richard Boone, Herbie Hancock, Eddie Henderson, Billy Hart, Keith Jarrett, Miroslav Vitous, Wayne Shorter, Joe Zawinul, Lee Konitz, Louis Jordan, Charles Mingus, Ken McIntyre, Nat Adderley, Donald Byrd, Tony Williams, Lou Bennett, Phil Woods, Charles McPherson, and Dizzy Gillespie. The American visitors influenced a whole generation of Danish jazz masters, including the Danish bass players Niels-Henning Ørsted Pedersen, Mads Vinding, Jesper Lundgaard, and Bo Stief, drummer Alex Riel, trumpeter Palle Mikkelborg, and many others.

== Reopening ==
In May 2010 Jazzhus Montmartre reopened in its original premises on Store Regnegade with a high-end international music profile. The reopening of the club made news around the globe, and the new Jazzhus Montmartre quickly made it back on the map as a top attraction of Copenhagen. The New York Times included Jazzhus Montmartre on its much-hyped list of must-see-places in the city under the headline "Rebirth Of Cool".

The reopening of Montmartre in May 2010 was initiated by media executive and entrepreneur Rune Bech together with jazz pianist Niels Lan Doky (who after eight months was replaced as music director by saxophonist Benjamin Koppel in February 2011). The former proprietor of the original historic venue, Herluf Kamp-Larsen, was present at the reopening night. When the premises became vacant after many years as a hairdressing school, Bech and Doky jumped at the opportunity and reopened Montmartre at its original location. Restoring the club became a labour of love for a dedicated group of volunteers, out of love for jazz and the history of Montmartre, which has often been called "The Village Vanguard of Europe" in homage to its legendary sister club in New York.

Montmartre's co-founder, Rune Bech was a foreign correspondent for Politiken from 1989. In 1998, he co-founded the successful health portal NetDoctor.com, and in 2001 became the internet director for the leading Danish broadcaster TV 2 and a member of the executive management team. Bech donated the funding capital for Jazzhus Montmartre as his con-amore passion project. Bech had a vision to establish Montmartre as a non-profit organisation. As a consequence Jazzhus Montmartre is set up as a charity foundation with former CEO of the Royal Danish Theatre and former chairman for Denmark's Radio (DR) Michael Christiansen as Montmartre's chairman, and Bech and lawyer Ole Borch as fellow board members.

Before reopening, Jazzhus Montmartre the founders wrote eight missions for the club, The Montmartre Manifesto. In short, Montmartre should be an international landmark of great jazz and a place that discovers and presents new talent with world class potential. It is the ambition "to create a paradise for life lovers with a cozy and sincere ambience". And, most importantly, "Montmartre should be known for its warm, welcoming and homey atmosphere attracting good people that follow their heart in life".

The Danish jazz publisher Christian Brorsen was the music director of Montmartre until 2016 when Swedish pianist Jan Lundgren took over. He is backed up by an Artistic Council whose members are drummer Alex Riel, bass players Lars Danielsson and Jonathan Bremer, jazz saxophonist Benjamin Koppel, drummer Morten Lund, and singer Sinne Eeg. The club is run by primarily by part-time staff together with a team of dedicated volunteers. With a limited audience capacity of only 85 seats, Montmartre is dependent on donations and membership fees from its club, Friends of Montmartre. Some of Denmark's large foundations have supported the reopening as has a grant from the City of Copenhagen. With its high level of artistic ambition, Montmartre is dependent on support and donations.

The old Jazzhus Montmartre was known for the plaster masks that became an icon for the club in the 1960s. They were created in 1959 by the artist Mogens Gylling and attracted attention around the world as a remarkable work of art. When Montmartre closed in 1976 the masks disappeared, but the Montmartre team convinced Gylling, who still lives outside Copenhagen, to recreate his famous wall art with a twist. The ten new masks were put back on the wall by the artist himself during Copenhagen Jazz Festival 2010, an event heavily covered by the media.

== Closure in 2020 due to the COVID-19 pandemic ==
On September 2, 2020, Jazzhus Montmartre wrote on their homepage that all future concerts will be canceled immediately due to the bad economic situation exacerbated by the government's regulation of attendance in relation to the COVID-19 pandemic. The club later announced it would reopen in November.

== Discography ==
Live albums documenting concerts in Jazzhus Montmartre include:

- Cecil Taylor: Nefertiti, the Beautiful One Has Come (Debut, 1962)
- Dexter Gordon & Atli Bjorn Trio: Cry Me a River (SteepleChase, November 1962)
- Roland Kirk: Kirk in Copenhagen (Mercury Records, October 1963)
- Kenny Dorham: Short Story (SteepleChase, December 1963)
- Dexter Gordon Quartet: Cheese Cake, King Neptune, I Want More, Love for Sale, It's You or No One, Billie's Bounce (all SteepleChase) recorded in 1964 released 1979–1983; Wee Dot, Loose Walk, Misty, Heartaches, Ladybird, Stella by Starlight (all SteepleChase) recorded 1965 released 2003–05, The Squirrel (Blue Note, 1967 [2001])
- Stuff Smith: Live at the Montmartre (Storyville Records, 1965)
- Bill Evans: Jazzhouse (Milestone, 1969 [1987]), You're Gonna Hear From Me (Milestone, 1969 [1988])
- Jackie McLean Quartet: Live at Montmartre (SteepleChase, 1972), A Ghetto Lullaby (SteepleChase, 1974)
- Joe Albany: Birdtown Birds (SteepleChase, 1973)
- Johnny Griffin: Blues for Harvey (SteepleChase, 1973)
- Warne Marsh and Lee Konitz: Warne Marsh Quintet: Jazz Exchange Vol. 1 (Storyville, 1975 [1976]), Live at the Montmartre Club: Jazz Exchange Vol. 2 (Storyville, 1975 [1977]), Warne Marsh Lee Konitz: Jazz Exchange Vol. 3 (Storyville, 1975 [1985])
- Stan Getz: Live at Montmartre (SteepleChase, 1977), Anniversary! (Emarcy, 1987 [1989]), Serenity (Emarcy, 1987 [1991]), People Time: The Complete Recordings (Sunnyside, 1991 [2010])
- Cedar Walton: First Set, Second Set, Third Set (SteepleChase, 1977)
- Ben Webster: At Montmartre 1965-1966 (Storyville, 21 January 1965 – 12 May 1966), My Man: Live at Montmartre 1973 (SteepleChase)
- Thad Jones: Live at Montmartre (Storyville Records, 1978)
- Don Pullen/George Adams Quintet: Live at Montmartre (Timeless, 1978)
- Chet Baker: Daybreak (Steeplechase, 1979), This Is Always (Steeplechase, 1979), Someday My Prince Will Come (SteepleChase, 1979)
- Art Pepper and Duke Jordan: Art Pepper with Duke Jordan in Copenhagen 1981 (Galaxy, 1981 [1996])
- Jack Walrath: In Europe (SteepleChase, 1982 [1983])
- Stanley Cowell Trio: Live at Copenhagen Jazz House (April, 1993)
- Dollar Brand: African Piano (October, 1969)
- Paul Bley: Live (Live from Jazzhouse Montmarte with Jesper Lundgaard, Steeplechase, 1986)
- Paul Bley: Live Again (Live from Jazzhouse Montmarte with Jesper Lundgaard, Steeplechase, 1986)
- Legends Of Jazzhus Montmartre 1959-1976: Sonny Rollins, Dexter Gordon, Ben Webster, Stan Getz, Johnny Griffin, Niels-Henning Ørsted Pedersen. Live recordings at Jazzhus Montmartre.

== Books and film ==
- "Dexter Gordon playing in Montmartre", 1969, film by Teit Jørgensen
- Article in Barry Kernfeld (editor) The New Grove Dictionary of Jazz, MacMillan 1991
- Frank Büchmann-Møller, Henrik Wolsgaard-Iversen: Montmartre. Jazzhuset i St. Regnegade 19, Kbhvn K 1959-1976, Syddansk Universitetsforlag (University Press of Southern Denmark), 2008 & 2010, 300 pages, ISBN 978-87-7674-297-3 (Danish, with list of concerts)
- Erik Wiedemann, Montmartre 1959–76: Historien om et jazzhus i København, 1997 (Danish)
- Jens Jørn Gjedsted, Thorborg, Niels Christensen, "Montmartre gennem 10 år (1976–1986), 1986 (Danish book on occasion of the 10th anniversary of the club in the new place)
- Between a Smile and a Tear, 2004, film by Niels Lan Doky
