= Cheese Cake (album) =

Live album by Dexter Gordon Quartet
- Released: 1979
- Recorded: June 11, 1964
- Venue: Jazzhus Montmartre, Copenhagen, Denmark
- Genre: Jazz
- Length: 39:20
- Label: SteepleChase; SCC-6008
- Producer: Nils Winther

Dexter Gordon chronology
One Flight Up (1964)	Cheese Cake (1979)	King Neptune (1974)

Cheese Cake (subtitled Dexter In Radioland Vol. 2) is a live album by American saxophonist Dexter Gordon recorded at the Jazzhus Montmartre in Copenhagen, Denmark in 1964 by Danmarks Radio and released on the SteepleChase label in 1979.

== Critical reception ==
Professional ratings
Review scores
Source	Rating
AllMusic	4/5 stars
DownBeat	4.5/5 stars
The Penguin Guide to Jazz Recordings	2.5/4 stars

AllMusic critic Scott Yanow stated "This particular LP features the great tenor with a rhythm section comprised of Europe's best ... Gordon takes long solos that never seem to run out of ideas, making this set a valuable addition to his lengthy discography".

DownBeat assigned the album 4.5 stars. Reviewer Arthur Moorhead wrote, ""In contrast to his usual reserved studio approach, Dexter plays with a searing intensity, most notably on the title track—an intensity missing in many of his current recordings".

== Track listing ==
All compositions by Dexter Gordon except where noted.

1. Introduction by Dexter Gordon – 2:20
2. "Cheese Cake" – 14:00
3. "Manhã de Carnaval" (Luiz Bonfá, Antônio Maria) – 9:30
4. "Second Balcony Jump" (Billy Eckstine, Gerald Valentine) – 13:30

== Personnel ==
- Dexter Gordon – tenor saxophone
- Tete Montoliu – piano
- Niels-Henning Ørsted Pedersen – bass
- Alex Riel – drums
