= I Want More (album) =

Live album by Dexter Gordon Quartet
- Released: 1980
- Recorded: July 9, 1964
- Venue: Jazzhus Montmartre, Copenhagen, Denmark
- Genre: Jazz
- Length: 50:30
- Label: SteepleChase; SCC-6015
- Producer: Nils Winther

Dexter Gordon chronology
King Neptune (1964)	I Want More (1980)	Love for Sale (1964)

I Want More (subtitled Dexter in Radioland Vol. 4) is a live album by American saxophonist Dexter Gordon recorded at the Jazzhus Montmartre in Copenhagen, Denmark in 1964 by Danmarks Radio and released on the SteepleChase label in 1980.

== Critical reception ==
Professional ratings
Review scores
Source	Rating
AllMusic	4/5 stars
The Penguin Guide to Jazz Recordings	3/4 stars

AllMusic critic Scott Yanow stated "Fans will want all of the releases in this enjoyable and well-recorded series".

== Track listing ==
All compositions by Dexter Gordon except where noted.

1. Introduction by Dexter Gordon – 0:30
2. "I Want More" – 11:05
3. "Come Rain or Come Shine" (Harold Arlen, Johnny Mercer) – 12:01
4. "Where Are You?" (Jimmy McHugh, Harold Adamson) – 9:32
5. "I Want to Blow Now" (Bennie Green) – 11:56
6. "Second Balcony Jump" (Billy Eckstine, Gerald Valentine) – 5:26

== Personnel ==
- Dexter Gordon – tenor saxophone, vocals
- Tete Montoliu – piano
- Niels-Henning Ørsted Pedersen – bass
- Rune Carlsson – drums
