= Bo Stief =

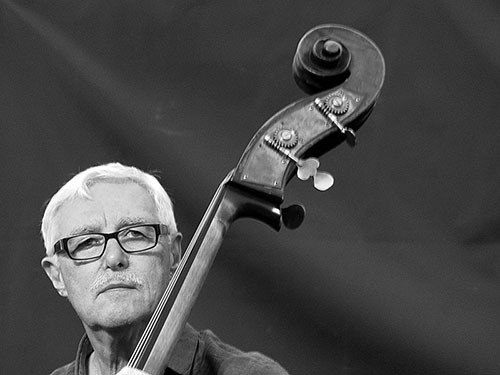

Background information
- Born: Bo Stief; October 15, 1946 (age 79)
- Origin: Copenhagen, Denmark
- Genres: Jazz
- Occupations: Double bassist, Composer, Arranger
- Instruments: Double bass and electric bass

Bo Stief (born 15 October 1946) is a Danish jazz and rock bassist, composer, and arranger born in Copenhagen.

He has worked or recorded with Don Cherry, Miles Davis, Warne Marsh, Stan Getz, Dizzy Gillespie, Dexter Gordon, Johnny Griffin, Jackie McLean, George Russell, Kenny Drew and Ben Webster, among many other prominent jazz musicians.

Since 1980 Stief has been leading bands as Chasing Dreams, Dream Machine or One Song III.

In 2005 he was awarded the Danish Django d’Or as Master of Jazz.

== Discography ==
=== As leader ===
- Hidden Frontiers (Replay, 1987)
- Chasing Dreams (Columbia, 1993)
- Heart & Destiny (Dream Song Music, 1999)
- First Time (Stunt, 2001)
- Short Story (Exlibris, 2006)

=== As sideman ===
With Don Cherry

- Live at Cafe Montmartre 1966 (3 volumes) (ESP-Disk, 2007)
- Copenhagen 1963 & Hilversum 1966 (FreeFactory, 2010)

With Peter Herbolzheimer

- Live Im Onkel Po (Polydor, 1975)
- Hip Walk (Polydor, 1976)
- Touchdown (Polydor, 1977)
- I Hear Voices (Polydor, 1978)
- Peter Herbolzheimer Rhythm Combination and Brass (PolJazz, 1979)
- Bandfire (Panda, 1981)
- Fat Man Boogie (Koala, 1982)
- Music for Swinging Dancers Vol. 3 Cheek to Cheek (Teldec, 1984)
- 25 Jahre Peter Herbolzheimer Die 80er und 90er Jahre (Koala, 1995)
- Masterpieces (MPS, 1995)
- Getting Down to Brass Tracks (Alanna, 2006)

With Chris Hinze

- Saliah (Keytone, 1984)
- Meditation and Mantras (Keytone, 1986)
- African Dream (Keytone, 1991)
- Music for Relaxation (Keytone, 1992)

With Krzysztof Komeda

- Live in Copenhagen (Polonia, 1993)
- Astigmatic Live (Polonia, 1995)
- Roman Two (Power Bros 1998)

With Warne Marsh

- Ornithology (Venus/Interplay, 1994)
- I Got a Good One for You (Storyville, 1999)
- Marshlands (Storyville, 2003)
- In Denmark (Absord 2009)

With Jesper Thilo

- I Remember Boone (Music Mecca, 2003)
- Remembering Those Who Were (Stunt, 2009)
- Jesper Thilo On Clarinet (Stunt, 2010)

With Jasper van 't Hof

- The Door Is Open (MPS/BASF, 1976)
- The Selfkicker (MPS 1977)
- Jazzbuhne Berlin '80 (Repertoire, 1990)
- Face to Face (Intuition, 1994)
- Canossa (Intuition, 1998)
- NeverNeverLand (Jaro Medien, 2005)
- Live at Quasimodo (Jaro Medien, 2007)

With others

- Frans Bak, Dagen for Imorgen (Salut, 1986)
- Hacke Bjorksten, The Party Is On! (Dragon, 2001)
- Eddie "Lockjaw" Davis, Swingin' Till the Girls Come Home (SteepleChase, 1976)
- Miles Davis, Aura (Columbia, 1989)
- Wild Bill Davison, Wild Bill Davison in Copenhagen (CBS, 1974)
- Povl Dissing, Lykkeland (Exlibris, 1977)
- Niels Lan Doky, The Truth Live at Montmartre (Storyville, 1988)
- Arne Domnerus, When Lights Are Low (Salut, 1988)
- Arne Domnerus, A Little Bossa Nova (LadyBird, 1998)
- Kenny Drew, Solo-Duo (Storyville, 1996)
- Ron Goodwin, Valhalla (Replay, 1986)
- Dexter Gordon, The Squirrel (Blue Note, 1997)
- Lars Graugaard, Smile (Skylight, 1986)
- Eddie Harris, Steps Up (SteepleChase, 1981)
- Tommy Korberg, Blixtlas Svensk 70-Tals Poesi (Sonet, 1979)
- Rolf Kuhn, Total Space (MPS/BASF, 1975)
- Didier Lockwood, Live in Montreux (Pausa, 1980)
- Ken McIntyre, Hindsight (SteepleChase, 1974)
- Jackie McLean, Live at Montmartre (SteepleChase, 1972)
- Jackie McLean, Ode to Super (SteepleChase, 1973)
- Palle Mikkelborg, Ashoka Suite/Guadiana Concert (Metronome, 1970)
- Palle Mikkelborg, Anything But Grey (Columbia, 1992)
- Vincent Nilsson, Jazz Trombone Spirituals (Storyville, 2000)
- Vincent Nilsson, More Spirituals! (Storyville, 2005)
- Frank Rosolino, Frank Talks! (Storyville, 2008)
- Sanne Salomonsen, Precious Moments (EMI, 1977)
- L. Subramaniam, Garland (Storyville, 1982)
- Buddy Tate, Tate a Tete at La Fontaine (Storyville, 1976)
- Tosedrengene, Tiden Star Stille (Mercury, 1981)
- Osten Warnerbring, Jag Bor Vid Ett Raststalle (Frituna, 1978)
- Osten Warnerbring, Jongloren (Frituna, 1978)
- Ben Webster, My Man: Live at Montmartre 1973 (SteepleChase, 1973)
- Gary Windo, His Master's Bones (Cuneiform, 1996)
