= Lee Konitz at Storyville =

Lee Konitz in Harvard Square

Live album by Lee Konitz
- Released: 1954
- Recorded: January 5, 1954
- Venue: Storyville, Boston, MA
- Genre: Jazz
- Length: 47:36 Reissue with additional material
- Label: Storyville; STLP-304
- Producer: George Wein

Lee Konitz chronology
Lee Konitz Plays (1953)	Lee Konitz in Harvard Square (1954)	Konitz (1954)

Black Lion Cover

Lee Konitz at Storyville (also known as Jazz at Storyville) is a live album by saxophonist Lee Konitz featuring performances recorded at the Storyville nightclub in Boston and which was originally released as a 10-inch LP on George Wein's Storyville label. It was recorded on January 5, 1954.

== Reception ==
Professional ratings
Review scores
Source	Rating
Allmusic	4.5/5 stars

On Allmusic, Scott Yanow wrote "This excellent set gives one a definitive look at altoist Lee Konitz at a period of time when he was breaking away from being a sideman and a student of Lennie Tristano and asserting himself as a leader. With pianist Ronnie Ball, bassist Percy Heath, and drummer Alan Levitt, Konitz explores a variety of his favorite chord changes, some of which were disguised by newer melodies".

== Track listing ==
All compositions by Lee Konitz except where noted

1. Introduction by John McLelland – 0:52 Additional track on reissue
2. "Hi Beck" – 7:38
3. "If I Had You" (Irving King, Ted Shapiro) – 11:19 Additional track on reissue
4. "Subconscious Lee" – 5:34
5. "Sound Lee" – 6:39
6. "Foolin' Myself" (Jack Lawrence, Peter Tinturin) – 6:01 Additional track on reissue
7. Introduction by John McLelland – 0:45 Additional track on reissue
8. "Ablution" – 4:43 Additional track on reissue
9. "These Foolish Things" (Harry Link, Holt Marvell, Jack Strachey) – 4:09
10. End Announcement by John McLelland – 0:39 Additional track on reissue

== Personnel ==
- Lee Konitz – alto saxophone
- Ronnie Ball – piano
- Percy Heath – bass
- Al Levitt – drums
