= Peter Ind =

British jazz double bassist (1928–2021)

Background information
- Born: 20 July 1928; Middlesex, England
- Died: 20 August 2021 (aged 93)
- Genres: Jazz
- Occupations: Musician, sound engineer, record producer, author, painter
- Instrument: Double bass
- Years active: 1940s–2021
- Labels: Atlantic, Bethlehem, Warwick, Storyville, Verve, Wave
- Formerly of: Lennie Tristano, Lee Konitz, Buddy Rich, Booker Ervin, Mal Waldron, Slim Gaillard
- Website: peterind.co.uk

Peter Ind (20 July 1928 – 20 August 2021) was a British jazz double bassist and record producer.

== Early life ==
Ind was born in Middlesex. His father was a builder. Ind began to learn the violin at the age of eight and played in his school orchestra. He soon found that he preferred the piano and played gigs from the age of 14 around his home in Uxbridge. At this point, he played mostly popular dance numbers of the time. He was influenced during World War II by radio broadcasts of American big bands. By the age of 16, his income, supplemented by a variety of day jobs, was greater than that of his father.

Feeling that he lacked a technical understanding of music, Ind took evening classes in piano and classical harmony at London's Trinity College of Music in the period 1944–46. He transitioned to playing the bass because he liked its sound and thought that his piano technique was limited. He had bass lessons from 1947 with Tim Bell, who "introduced me to what was then a revolutionary method of bass fingering, in which all four fingers of the left hand are used – playing semitone intervals", and later with James Merrett. He also became a full-time musician in 1947.

In 1949, he was a musician on the Queen Mary, which sailed to New York; there, Ind met pianist Lennie Tristano for the first time and listened to other leading jazz musicians in the city's clubs. The ship returned to New York every two weeks, allowing Ind and others to have a fortnightly lesson with Tristano. After one 1950 lesson, the pianist invited Ind to play the first set that his band had at the Birdland club that evening, as the trio's regular bassist was going to be late.

== Later life and career ==
Ind relocated to New York City in 1951, arriving on 29 April. In 1953, he stopped taking lessons from Tristano and toured with saxophonist Lee Konitz. Ind's first album recordings were with Konitz – Lee Konitz at Harvard Square and Konitz. Ind also played with Tristano, Buddy Rich, Booker Ervin, Mal Waldron, and Slim Gaillard. Ind played at the first Newport Jazz Festival, in 1954, as part of Tristano's sextet. Ind was bassist on pianist Jutta Hipp's first US performances and some of her recordings.

Ind also branched into production at this time, and was a pioneer in stereo recording and overdubbing of jazz music in the 1950s. He established a recording studio in 1956. He used money received after his father's death to finance the purchasing of recording equipment and a studio. He produced sessions in his loft for Zoot Sims, Gerry Mulligan, and Booker Little. He founded his own label at the end of the 1950s, where he released the album Looking Out, featuring Joe Puma and Dick Scott. In addition to his own endeavors, he worked in sound engineering for the labels Atlantic, Verve, Bethlehem, and Warwick, founding his own company, Wave, in 1961.

In 1962, he married Barbara; their daughter, Anna, was born later that year. They married in London, but returned to New York the following year. In 1963, Ind moved to Big Sur, California, where he remained for three years. At this time he concentrated on performing unaccompanied, and recorded several albums of solo material. In 1965, he played with Konitz and Warne Marsh, an association that continued into the 1970s. Private recordings under the Wave imprint began to be issued.

Ind and his family returned to the UK in 1966, where he played and taught. The following year, he played with Tristano for the last time, at a concert in the UK. Between 1984 and 1994, he ran the Bass Clef club and a smaller room, the Tenor Clef, in Hoxton Square, London, which featured many visiting American musicians. The clubs eventually folded because of financial difficulties. He is the author of two books: Jazz Visions - The Legacy of Lennie Tristano, a memoir of his association with Tristano and the state of jazz in 1950s New York, and The Environment and Cosmic Metabolism, a look at Wilhelm Reich and concerns about the earth's future regarding energy. In 2015, he won the Special Award of the British Parliamentary Jazz Awards.

== Discography ==
=== As leader/coleader ===
- Looking Out - Jazz Bass Baroque (Wave, 1999) – A compilation of jazz recorded over a period of forty years: 1959 - 1999
- Looking Out (Wave, 1961) – with Ronnie Ball, Sal Mosca, Joe Puma, Al Schackman, Dick Scott and Sheila Jordan
- Peter Ind - Improvisation (Wave, 1968)
- Time for Improvisation (Wave, 1969)
- No Kidding (Wave, 1974) – with Dave Cliff, Chas. Burchell, Tox Drohar and Dick Scott
- The Peter Ind Sextet (Wave, 1975) – with Bernie Cash, Dave Cliff, Derek Phillips, Chas. Burchall and Gray Allard
- Jazz at the Richmond Festival (Wave, ?) – with Bernie Cash, Derek Phillips and Chas. Burchell
- Some Hefty Cats (Hefty Jazz, 1976) – with Dick Welstood
- Jazz Bass Baroque (Wave, 1988) – with Martin Taylor and others

=== As sideman ===
With Paul Bley

- Paul Bley (EmArcy, 1954)

With Bud Freeman

- Song of the Tenor (Philips, 1975)

With Jutta Hipp

- At the Hickory House Volume 1 (Blue Note, 1956)
- At the Hickory House Volume 2 (Blue Note, 1956)

With Lee Konitz

- Konitz (Storyville, 1954)
- Lee Konitz in Harvard Square (Storyvile, 1954)
- Inside Hi-Fi (Atlantic, 1956)
- The Real Lee Konitz (Atlantic, 1957)
- Very Cool (Verve, 1957)
- Live at the Montmartre Club: Jazz Exchange Vol. 2 (Storyville, 1975 [1977]) with Warne Marsh
- Lee Konitz Meets Warne Marsh Again (Pausa, 1976) with Warne Marsh
- Jazz A Confronto 32 (Horo, 1976)

With Warne Marsh

- The Art of Improvising (Revelation, 1959 [1974})

With Jimmy Raney

- Strings and Swings (Muse, 1958)

With Buddy Rich

- Buddy Rich in Miami (Verve, 1958)

With Tommy Whittle

- Sax for Dreamers (Masquerade Records, 1967)

== Books ==
- Jazz Visions - Lennie Tristano and His Legacy (2005, ISBN 978-1-84553-281-9)
- The Environment and Cosmic Metabolism - Looking at the stars and thinking about the Earth (2007, ISBN 978-0-9558062-0-9)
- Painting the Energy of Nature (2008)
