= Konitz (album) =

Studio album by Lee Konitz
- Released: 1954
- Recorded: August 6, 1954
- Studio: NYC
- Genre: Jazz
- Length: 47:38 CD reissue with alternate takes
- Label: Storyville; LP-313
- Producer: George Wein

Lee Konitz chronology
Lee Konitz at Storyville (1954)	Konitz (1954)	Lee Konitz in Harvard Square (1954-55)

Black Lion Cover

Konitz is an album by saxophonist and bandleader Lee Konitz featuring performances recorded in 1954 which was originally released as a 10-inch LP on George Wein's Storyville label. The album was rereleased with additional alternate takes on CD in 1989 on the Black Lion label.

== Reception ==
Professional ratings
Review scores
Source	Rating
Allmusic	4.5/5 stars

The Allmusic review by Scott Yanow stated "The 1954 Lee Konitz Quartet did not last long but they did record some worthwhile performances that still sound fresh over 40 years later. ... Altoist Konitz is ably assisted by pianist Ronnie Ball, bassist Peter Ind and drummer Jeff Morton on cool/bop performances which give one a good sampling of how Konitz sounded in his early prime".

== Track listing ==
All compositions by Lee Konitz except where noted

1. "Bop Goes the Leesel" [Take 5] (Warne Marsh) – 2:12
2. "Easy Livin'" (Ralph Rainger, Leo Robin) – 3:08
3. "Mean to Me" [Take 4] (Fred E. Ahlert, Roy Turk) – 3:49
4. "I'll Remember April" [Take 3] (Gene de Paul, Patricia Johnston, Don Raye) – 5:38
5. "317 East 32nd" (Lennie Tristano) – 4:02
6. "Skylark" (Hoagy Carmichael, Johnny Mercer) – 3:05
7. "Nursery Rhyme" [Take 12] – 3:16
8. "Limehouse Blues" (Philip Braham, Douglas Furber) – 3:05
9. "Bop Goes the Leesel" [Take 1] (Marsh) – 2:44 Bonus track on CD reissue
10. "Bop Goes the Leesel" [Take 2] (Marsh) – 2:51 Bonus track on CD reissue
11. "Mean to Me" [Take 1] (Ahlert, Turk) – 3:39 Bonus track on CD reissue
12. "Nursery Rhyme' [Take 1] – 3:38 Bonus track on CD reissue
13. "Nursery Rhyme" [Take 4] – 3:13 Bonus track on CD reissue
14. "Nursery Rhyme" [Take 5] – 3:55 Bonus track on CD reissue

== Personnel ==
- Lee Konitz – alto saxophone
- Ronnie Ball – piano
- Peter Ind – bass
- Jeff Morton – drums
