= The Unissued 1975 Copenhagen Studio Recordings =

Studio album by Warne Marsh Quartet
- Released: 1997
- Recorded: December 28, 1975
- Studio: Ivar Rosenberg Studio, Copenhagen, Denmark
- Genre: Jazz
- Length: 56:12
- Label: Storyville; STCD 8259
- Producer: Arnvid Meyer

Warne Marsh chronology
Warne Marsh Lee Konitz: Jazz Exchange Vol. 3 (1975)	The Unissued 1975 Copenhagen Studio Recordings (1997)	The Unissued Copenhagen Studio Recordings (1975)

The Unissued 1975 Copenhagen Studio Recordings is an album by the Warne Marsh Quartet, recorded in Denmark in late 1975 but not released on the Storyville label until 1997.

== Reception ==
Professional ratings
Review scores
Source	Rating
AllMusic	4/5 stars
The Penguin Guide to Jazz Recordings	3/4 stars

The AllMusic review noted: "This studio set matches Marsh with guitarist Dave Cliff, bassist Niels Pedersen and drummer Alan Levitt. His sidemen's tasteful yet stimulating support allows Marsh to be in the spotlight virtually the entire time ... the unique tenorman's cool tone and harmonically advanced style are heard in superb form".

== Track listing ==
1. "Blues in G Flat" (Warne Marsh) – 7:26
2. "After You've Gone" (Turner Layton, Henry Creamer) – 3:35
3. "The Song Is You" [take 1] (Jerome Kern, Oscar Hammerstein II) – 6:12
4. "Lennie Bird" [take 2] (Lennie Tristano) – 5:52
5. "It's You or No One" [take 2] (Jule Styne, Sammy Cahn) – 6:05
6. "God Bless the Child" (Arthur Herzog Jr., Billie Holiday) – 6:41
7. "The Way You Look Tonight" (Jerome Kern) – 5:52
8. "Without a Song" (Vincent Youmans) – 6:24
9. "You Don't Know What Love Is" (Gene de Paul, Don Raye) – 6:25
10. "Be My Love" (Nicholas Brodszky) – 5:42
11. "Lennie Bird" [take 3] (Tristano) – 5:03

== Personnel ==
- Warne Marsh – tenor saxophone
- Dave Cliff – guitar
- Niels-Henning Ørsted Pedersen – bass
- Al Levitt – drums
