= Ike Isaacs =

Ike Isaacs may refer to:

- Ike Isaacs (guitarist) (1919–1996), Burmese-British jazz guitarist
- Ike Isaacs (bassist) (1923–1981), American jazz bassist
