= Paul Bley (album) =

Studio album by Paul Bley
- Released: 1955
- Recorded: February 3 and August 26 & 30, 1954
- Studio: Fine Sound Studios, New York City
- Genre: Jazz
- Length: 41:11
- Label: Wing Records; MGW 60001

Paul Bley chronology
Introducing Paul Bley (1953)	Paul Bley (1955)	Solemn Meditation (1958)

Professional ratings
Review scores
Source	Rating
Allmusic	4/5 stars
The Penguin Guide to Jazz	3/4 stars

Paul Bley is the second album by Canadian jazz pianist Paul Bley featuring tracks recorded in 1954 and released on Wing Records (a Mercury Records subsidiary established in 1955).

== Reception ==
Eugene Chadbourne, reviewing the album for Allmusic, said of the album: "Pick a personality trait of the Paul Bley style and chances are it won't be found anywhere here, as lovely a piano trio jazz record as this is... For the most part the tone of the pianist remains almost frigid in its consistency; volume level rarely varies and the direction of the improvisations is solidly mainstream... The obvious problem with someone like Bley or Jimi Hendrix is that once they developed their totally unique musical personality, their earlier work starts to sound a little boring". The Penguin Guide to Jazz said "At this stage of his career, he's a very orthodox bopper, aware of the blues but certainly not restricted by them, possibly exploring aspects of Tristano's evolution as well, and certainly listening to classical pianists for technique and harmonic ideas".

== Track listing ==
1. "Topsy" (Edgar Battle, Eddie Durham) - 2:46
2. "My Heart" (Paul Bley) - 2:43
3. "That Old Feeling" (Lew Brown, Sammy Fain) - 2:41
4. "There Will Never Be Another You" (Mack Gordon, Harry Warren) - 5:50
5. "Autumn Breeze" (Milt Jackson) - 3:13
6. "I Want to Be Happy" (Irving Caesar, Vincent Youmans) - 2:22
7. "My Old Flame" (Sam Coslow, Arthur Johnston) - 3:30
8. "Time on My Hands" (Harold Adamson, Gordon, Youmans) - 3:34
9. "Drum One" (Paul Bley) - 2:24
10. "This Can't Be Love" (Lorenz Hart, Richard Rodgers) - 3:12
11. "My One and Only (What Am I Gonna Do)" (George Gershwin, Ira Gershwin) - 6:47
12. "52nd Street Theme" (Thelonious Monk) - 2:49
- Recorded at Fine Sound Studios in New York City on February 3 (tracks 5 & 9), August 26 (tracks 1–4 & 7) and August 20 (tracks 6, 8 & 10–12), 1954

== Personnel ==
- Paul Bley - piano
- Percy Heath (tracks 5 & 9), Peter Ind (tracks 1–4, 6–8 & 10–12) - bass
- Al Levitt - drums
