= The Unissued Copenhagen Studio Recordings =

Studio album by Warne Marsh Trio
- Released: 1997
- Recorded: December 29, 1975
- Studio: Rosenberg, Copenhagen, Denmark
- Genre: Jazz
- Length: 56:12
- Label: Storyville; STCD 8278
- Producer: Arnvid Meyer

Warne Marsh chronology
The Unissued 1975 Copenhagen Studio Recordings (1975)	The Unissued Copenhagen Studio Recordings (1997)	All Music (1976)

The Unissued Copenhagen Studio Recordings is an album by saxophonist Warne Marsh's Trio, recorded in Denmark in late 1975 but not released on the Storyville label until 1997.

== Reception ==
Professional ratings
Review scores
Source	Rating
AllMusic	4/5 stars
The Penguin Guide to Jazz Recordings	3.5/4 stars

The AllMusic review noted, "A masterful improviser who stayed creative within the boundaries of advanced chordal improvisation, tenor saxophonist Warne Marsh is heard in excellent form throughout... This is a rather sparse setting and, despite occasional bass solos, the focus throughout is primarily on Marsh. Fortunately he was in fine form that day and the results are a fine effort".

== Track listing ==
1. "Confirmation" (Charlie Parker) – 4:36
2. "I Can't Give You Anything But Love" (Jimmy McHugh, Dorothy Fields) – 5:28
3. "Without a Song" (Vincent Youmans, Edward Eliscu, Billy Rose) – 6:57
4. "Just One of Those Things" (Cole Porter) – 3:31
5. "All the Things You Are" (Jerome Kern, Oscar Hammerstein II) – 5:11
6. "I Should Care" (Axel Stordahl, Sammy Cahn, Paul Weston) – 4:27
7. "The More I See You" (Harry Warren, Mack Gordon) – 6:28
8. "When You're Smiling" (Larry Shay, Mark Fisher, Joe Goodwin) – 2:58
9. "Taking a Chance on Love" (Vernon Duke, Ted Fetter, John La Touche) – 3:43
10. "Little Willie Leaps" (Miles Davis) – 4:49
11. "Ev'ry Time We Say Goodbye" (Cole Porter) – 4:13
12. "I Want to Be Happy" (Vincent Youmans, Irving Caesar) – 4:29

== Personnel ==
- Warne Marsh – tenor saxophone
- Niels-Henning Ørsted Pedersen – bass
- Al Levitt – drums
