= Geoff Simkins =

British jazz musician (born 1948)

- Born: 13 October 1948 (age 77)
- Origin: England
- Genres: Jazz
- Occupation: Instrumentalist
- Instrument: Alto saxophone

Geoff Simkins (born 13 October 1948) is a British jazz musician who plays alto saxophone.

== Career ==
Simkins started playing jazz in his early teens. His first instrument was drums, but he quickly changed to the alto saxophone. He turned professional in 1977.

His early work included time with the Harry Strutters Hot Rhythm Orchestra and the Temperance Seven, but his principal stylistic influences have been the American alto player Lee Konitz and tenor player Warne Marsh.

Geoff has played at concerts, clubs and festivals in all parts of the UK, in Europe and beyond. He often works with American musicians who are visiting the UK, and over the years this list has grown to include Art Farmer, Bobby Shew, Al Cohn, Tal Farlow, Slide Hampton, Warren Vache, Al Grey, Kenny Davern, Bill Berry, Al Casey, Howard Alden, Ruby Braff, Bill Coleman and Conte Candoli. He has recorded with UK tenor player Danny Moss and with US trumpeters Billy Butterfield and Yank Lawson. Since the 1980s he has worked regularly with UK guitarist Dave Cliff.

Geoff is also a respected teacher, and as well as running improvisation courses in Brighton, UK, he has been a regular tutor at the famous Glamorgan Jazz Summer School in Wales (now discontinued, but later held at Trinity College of Music in London and, from 2012, at the Royal Welsh College of Music and Drama in Cardiff). In 1994 he was invited to be a tutor at the Czech Jazz Summer School and appeared at clubs in Prague and on Czech Television.

== Selected recordings ==
with Nikki Iles, piano

- Don't Ask

with Dave Cliff

- The Right Time (LP)
- West Coast Blues (MC)
- Sipping At Bells (CD)
- The Music of Tadd Dameron (CD)
- Conversation (CD)

with Allan Ganley and Dave Cliff

- Live at the Station

with Howard Alden

- Howard Alden's UK4 Live@Lewes

== Sources ==
- John Chilton, Who's Who of British Jazz, Cassell, London 1997 ISBN 0-8264-7234-6
