= The Right Combination (Joe Albany album) =

Studio album by Joe Albany
- Released: 1958
- Recorded: September 1957; Los Angeles, California
- Genre: Jazz
- Length: 42:29
- Label: Riverside; RLP 12–270

Joe Albany chronology
The Right Combination (1958)	Joe Albany at Home (1971)

Warne Marsh chronology
Art Pepper with Warne Marsh (1956)	The Right Combination (1957)	Music for Prancing (1957)

The Right Combination is the debut album by American jazz pianist Joe Albany featuring saxophonist Warne Marsh, recorded in 1957 for the Riverside label.

== Reception ==
Professional ratings
Review scores
Source	Rating
AllMusic	4.5/5 stars
The Penguin Guide to Jazz	3.5/4 stars
The Rolling Stone Jazz Record Guide	4/5 stars

The AllMusic review states: "From the historical standpoint, this release is essential". The Penguin Guide to Jazz described it as "a jam at engineer Ralph Garretson's home, but for all its technical failings it does reveal a remarkable stylist".

== Track listing ==
1. "Daahoud" (Clifford Brown) – 4:56
2. "Angel Eyes" (Earl Brent, Matt Dennis) – 6:04
3. " I Love You" (Cole Porter) – 8:30
4. "Body and Soul" (Frank Eyton, Johnny Green, Edward Heyman, Robert Sour) – 8:24
5. "It's You or No One" (Sammy Cahn, Jule Styne) – 5:02
6. "All the Things You Are" (Oscar Hammerstein II, Jerome Kern) – 7:20
7. "The Nearness of You" (Hoagy Carmichael, Ned Washington) – 2:13

== Personnel ==
- Joe Albany – piano
- Warne Marsh – tenor saxophone
- Bob Whitlock – bass
