= Movin' Around =

Movin' Around or Moving Around may refer to:

- "Movin' Around", a song by Cyhi the Prynce from No Dope on Sundays
- "Movin' Around", a song by Daz Dillinger from R.A.W.
- "Movin' Around", a song by Lee Konitz from Very Cool
- "Movin' Around", a song by Vengaboys from The Party Album
- "Moving Around", a song by Not Drowning, Waving
