= Star Highs =

Studio album by Warne Marsh Quartet
- Released: 1982
- Recorded: August 14, 1982
- Studio: Studio 44, Monster, Holland
- Genre: Jazz
- Length: 63:14
- Label: Criss Cross Jazz; 1002
- Producer: Gerry Teekens

Warne Marsh chronology
I Remember You... (1980)	Star Highs (1982)	Warne Marsh Meets Gary Foster (1982)

Star Highs, is an album by saxophonist Warne Marsh, recorded in 1982 and released on the Dutch Criss Cross Jazz label.

== Reception ==
Professional ratings
Review scores
Source	Rating
AllMusic	4.5/5 stars
The Penguin Guide to Jazz	3.5/4 stars

The AllMusic review states: "Tenor saxophonist Warne Marsh and pianist Hank Jones had not performed together before they met up in the studio ... plenty of sparks fly between the two lead soloists. Marsh plays with more fire than one would expect from the cool-toned tenor; the material is fresher than usual, and the album can be easily recommended to straight-ahead jazz collectors".

== Track listing ==
All compositions by Warne Marsh except where noted

1. "Switchboard Joe" – 5:54
2. "Star Highs" – 7:51
3. "Hank's Tune" (Hank Jones) – 5:39
4. "Moose the Mooche" (Charlie Parker) – 5:53
5. "Victory Ball" (Lennie Tristano) – 4:55
6. "Sometimes" – 9:52
7. "One for the Band" – 6:25
8. "Switchboard Joe" [take 1] – 5:02 Bonus track on CD reissue
9. "Sometimes" [take 1] – 6:07 Bonus track on CD reissue
10. "Star Highs" [take 1] – 6:44 Bonus track on CD reissue

== Personnel ==
- Warne Marsh – tenor saxophone
- Hank Jones – piano
- George Mraz – double bass|bass
- Mel Lewis – drums

Production

- Gerry Teekens – producer
- Max Bolleman – engineer
