= Lee Konitz with Warne Marsh =

Studio album by Lee Konitz with Warne Marsh
- Released: December 1955
- Recorded: June 14, 1955 in New York City
- Genre: Cool jazz
- Length: 42:23
- Label: Atlantic
- Producer: Nesuhi Ertegun

Lee Konitz chronology
Lee Konitz in Harvard Square (1954)	Lee Konitz with Warne Marsh (1955)	Lee Konitz Featuring Hans Koller, Lars Gullin, Roland Kovac (1956)

Warne Marsh chronology
Live in Hollywood (1952)	Lee Konitz with Warne Marsh (1955)	Jazz of Two Cities (1956)

Lee Konitz with Warne Marsh is a 1955 studio album by jazz saxophonists Lee Konitz and Warne Marsh. The Atlantic catalogue number was SD 1217. It was recorded on June 14, 1955, at Coastal Studios in New York City.

The album was re-released on LP by Atlantic Records in 1982, newly remastered by George Piros.

== Critical reception ==
Professional ratings
Review scores
Source	Rating
AllMusic	4/5 stars
The Guardian	4/5 stars
The Penguin Guide to Jazz	3.5/4 stars
The Rolling Stone Jazz Record Guide	4/5 stars

Billboard said, "This album is remarkable not only for the superb modern musicianship...but for their successful use of varied old and new jazz sources."

John Fordham of The Guardian said that "if these two saxophonists play with an even, almost chilly undemonstrativeness, their melodic ingenuity is dazzling". Peter Marsh, writing for BBC Music, said, "Graceful, intelligent improvising that swings - what more could you want? Highly recommended." Scott Yanow, writing for AllMusic, said that they "always made for a perfect team." The Penguin Guide to Jazz selected this album as part of its suggested Core Collection.

== Track listing ==
No.	Title	Writer(s)	Length
1.	"Topsy"	Edgar Battle; Eddie Durham	5:29
2.	"There Will Never Be Another You"	Harry Warren	4:49
3.	"I Can't Get Started"	Vernon Duke	3:58
4.	"Donna Lee"	Charlie Parker	6:17
5.	"Two Not One"	Lennie Tristano	5:35
6.	"Don't Squawk"	Oscar Pettiford	7:20
7.	"Ronnie's Line"	Ronnie Ball	3:10
8.	"Background Music"	Warne Marsh	5:45

== Personnel ==
- Lee Konitz – alto saxophone
- Warne Marsh – tenor saxophone
- Sal Mosca – piano (tracks 2, 4–6, 8)
- Ronnie Ball – piano (track 7)
- Billy Bauer – guitar
- Oscar Pettiford – double bass
- Kenny Clarke – drums

Production

- Nesuhi Ertegun – producer
- Claude Nobs – producer (reissue)
- William Claxton – photography
