= Bob Whitlock (musician) =

American jazz musician (1931–2015)

Bob Whitlock (January 21, 1931, Roosevelt, Utah – June 20, 2015, Long Beach, California) was an American jazz double-bassist.

== Background ==
Whitlock began playing bass as a teenager, and was active in Los Angeles as a session musician from the early 1950s, working with Gerry Mulligan, Art Pepper, Chet Baker, Stan Getz, Buddy DeFranco, Joe Albany, Jack Sheldon, Warne Marsh, and others. He also led his own small group late in the decade and attended the University of California. He worked in France in the early 1960s, playing with Zoot Sims, Vi Redd, Curtis Amy, and Victor Feldman. Later in the decade he worked with Joe Pass and extensively with George Shearing. In the 1970s he worked with Albany once again.

== Discography ==
=== As sideman ===
- Joe Albany, The Right Combination (Riverside, 1958)
- Joe Albany, Proto-Bopper (Revelation, 1972)
- Curtis Amy, Tippin' On Through (Pacific Jazz, 1962)
- Chet Baker, Pretty/Groovy (World Pacific, 1958)
- Victor Feldman, Stop the World I Want to Get Off (World Pacific, 1962)
- Victor Feldman, Soviet Jazz Themes (Ava, 1963)
- Stan Getz, And the Cool Sounds (Verve, 1957)
- Stan Getz, Stan Getz Plays (Verve, 1988)
- Peggy Lee, Pass Me By (Capitol, 1965)
- Joe Pass, Simplicity (World Pacific, 1967)
- Art Pepper, Surf Ride (Savoy, 1956)
- Art Pepper, Art Pepper & Sonny Redd (Regent, 1959)
- Vi Redd, Birdcall (United Artists, 1962)
- Zoot Sims, Zoot Sims in Paris (United Artists, 1962)
