= Lee Konitz in Harvard Square =

Studio album by Lee Konitz
- Released: 1955
- Recorded: April 1954
- Studio: Harvard Square, Boston, MA
- Genre: Jazz
- Label: Storyville; LP-323
- Producer: George Wein

Lee Konitz chronology
Konitz (1954)	Lee Konitz in Harvard Square (1955)	Lee Konitz with Warne Marsh (1955)

Lee Konitz in Harvard Square is an album by saxophonist and bandleader Lee Konitz featuring performances recorded in Boston in 1954 which was originally released as a 10-inch LP on George Wein's Storyville label.

== Reception ==
Professional ratings
Review scores
Source	Rating
Allmusic	3/5 stars

In JazzTimes, Duck Baker wrote "You don’t have to be a hard core fan to recognize that Konitz at his best is a wonderfully inspired improviser, and these ’54-’55 recordings capture him in peak form. His phrasing, attack, and the beautiful flow of ideas will make believers out of any but those who just can’t hear what he’s after with that tone at all".

== Track listing ==
1. "No Splice" (Lee Konitz) – 3:29
2. "She's Funny That Way" (Neil Moret, Richard A. Whiting) – 2:45
3. "Time on My Hands" (Vincent Youmans, Harold Adamson, Mack Gordon) – 2:35
4. "Foolin' Myself" (Jack Lawrence, Peter Tinturin) – 2:35
5. "Ronnie's Tune" (Ronnie Ball) – 4:01
6. "Froggy Day" (Ball) – 3:41
7. "My Old Flame" (Sam Coslow, Arthur Johnston) – 2:50

== Personnel ==
- Lee Konitz – alto saxophone
- Ronnie Ball – piano
- Peter Ind – bass
- Jeff Morton – drums
