= The Art of Improvising =

Live album by Warne Marsh
- Released: 1974
- Recorded: February 17 & 24, 1959
- Venues: Half Note Club, NYC
- Genre: Jazz
- Length: 40:55
- Labels: Revelation; REV 22
- Producers: John William Hardy, Jon Horwich

Warne Marsh chronology
Warne Marsh (1958)	The Art of Improvising (1974)	The Art of Improvising Volume 2 (1959)

The Art of Improvising (subtitled Solo Excerpts from 1959 Sessions at the Half Note), is a live album by saxophonist Warne Marsh recorded in 1959 and released on the Revelation label in 1974. Each track on The album only features part of the performance containing Marsh's solo although an album featuring twelve complete performances from these shows was released in 1994 under Kontz's name as Live at the Half Note.

== Reception ==
Professional ratings
Review scores
Source	Rating
Allmusic	3/5 stars
DownBeat	5/5 stars

The Allmusic review noted "This is an odd record. ... The pianist/composer Lennie Tristano, with whom Marsh had a long relationship, evidently decided the only valuable moments from the sessions were these solos, so he simply excised everything else and presented them as self-contained pieces. For the general listener, this, of course, creates some problems. No themes are heard (though many of the pieces are standards), so the basis for the improvisation can often only be guessed at, and, obviously, any sense of wholeness is by the boards. On the other hand, Marsh's tenor playing is supple, silvery, and generally luscious ... So while the normal jazz listening experience is necessarily lacking, those who want a chance to hear Marsh in isolation (including, presumably, students of the saxophone) might find this release to be a valuable document".

John Litweiler of DownBeat awarded the album 5 stars and wrote: "Despite the excellence of his other recordings and his current eminence as the major soloist of Supersax, this is very nearly the definitive Marsh record, the "distilled essence" of one of the most brilliant and significant creators of our time."

== Track listing ==
1. "Strike up the Band" (George Gershwin, Ira Gershwin) – 2:30
2. "It's You or No One" (Jule Styne, Sammy Cahn) – 2:10
3. "Subconscious-Lee" (Lee Konitz) – 1:37
4. "You Stepped Out of a Dream" (Nacio Herb Brown, Gus Kahn) – 2:22
5. "Scrapple from the Apple" (Charlie Parker) – 2:18
6. "I'll Remember April" (Gene de Paul, Patricia Johnston, Don Raye) – 1:36
7. "Back Home Again in Indiana" (James F. Hanley, Ballard MacDonald) – 1:55
8. "Lunar Elevation" (Warne Marsh) – 2:26
9. "A Song for You" (Marsh) – 2:11
10. "How About You?" (Burton Lane, Ralph Freed) – 1:55
11. "Scrapple from the Apple" (Parker) – 2:00
12. "Blues" (Marsh) – 1:20
13. "I Can't Believe That You're in Love with Me" (Jimmy McHugh, Clarence Gaskill) – 2:21
14. "It's You or No One" (Styne, Cahn) – 1:10
15. "[Indian Summer" (Victor Herbert, Al Dubin) – 1:50
16. "It's You or No One" (Styne, Cahn) – 1:10
17. "You Stepped Out of a Dream" (Brown, Kahn) – 2:05
18. "April, I'll Remember" (de Paul, Johnson, Raye) – 2:30
19. " Indiana" (Hanley, MacDonald) – 2:40
20. "Half Nelson" (Miles Davis) – 2:49

== Personnel ==
- Warne Marsh – tenor saxophone
- Lee Konitz – alto saxophone (tracks 4, 11, 15 & 18)
- Bill Evans – piano
- Peter Ind – bass
- Paul Motian – drums
