= Warne Marsh & Susan Chen =

Studio album by Warne Marsh and Susan Chen
- Released: 1986
- Recorded: June 17, 1985 and January 14, 1986
- Studio: Music Box Recording Studio, NYC and Classic Sound Productions Studio, NYC
- Genre: Jazz
- Length: 38:16
- Label: Interplay (IP-8601)
- Producer: Toshiya Taenaka

Warne Marsh chronology
Ballad for You (1985)	Warne Marsh & Susan Chen (1986)	Back Home (1986)

Warne Marsh & Susan Chen is an album by saxophonist Warne Marsh and pianist Susan Chen recorded in 1986 (with one track from 1985) and released on the Interplay label.

== Reception ==
Professional ratings
Review scores
Source	Rating
Allmusic	3/5 stars

Allmusic states, "the music is generally quite rewarding. Warne Marsh was in prime form during the last years of his life, and Susan Chen (who had studied with Tristano for four months) was starting to develop her own style".

== Track listing ==
All compositions by Warne Marsh except where noted.

1. "This Thing" – 3:00
2. "Summer Morning" – 2:38
3. "Summer Evening" – 2:38
4. "Pennies" – 1:47
5. "Always" – 3:30
6. "Marvelous Words" – 2:52
7. "Strike Out" – 2:20
8. "Another You" – 2:38
9. "It's You" – 2:05
10. "Alright" – 3:25
11. "Skylark" (Hoagy Carmichael, Johnny Mercer) – 4:00
12. "This Be Love" – 3:38
13. "Have You Met?" – 1:52
14. "Again" – 1:53
- Recorded at Music Box Recording Studio, NYC on June 17, 1985 (track 11) and at Classic Sound Productions Studio, NYC on January 14, 1986 (tracks 1–10 & 12–14)

== Personnel ==
- Warne Marsh – tenor saxophone
- Susan Chen – piano
