= I Remember You... =

Studio album by Karin Krog, Warne Marsh and Red Mitchell
- Released: 1980
- Recorded: April 8–9, 1980
- Studio: Arne Bendiksen, Oslo, Norway
- Genre: Jazz
- Length: 45:00
- Label: Spotlite; SPJLP22
- Producer: Johs Bergh, Karin Krog

Warne Marsh chronology
How Deep, How High (1979)	I Remember You... (1980)	Star Highs (1982)

Karin Krog chronology
With Malice Towards None (1980)	I Remember You... (1980)	Two of a Kind (1982)

I Remember You..., is an album by vocalist Karin Krog with saxophonist Warne Marsh and bassist Red Mitchell, recorded in 1980 and released on the Spotlite label.

== Reception ==
Professional ratings
Review scores
Source	Rating
AllMusic	4/5 stars
The Penguin Guide to Jazz Recordings	3/4 stars

The AllMusic review states, "The play list includes both jazz and pop standards. More to the point, regardless of the nature of the tunes, these three reconstruct them with a modern jazz feel... I Remember You is another memorable chapter in the artistic life of a consummate jazz performer and is recommended".

== Track listing ==
1. "I Remember You" (Victor Schertzinger, Johnny Mercer) – 5:37
2. "Trane" (Tadd Dameron, Karin Krog) – 7:20
3. "Lester's Happy" (Lester Young, King Pleasure) – 3:05
4. "Moody's Mood for Love (James Moody, Eddie Jefferson) – 4:47
5. "It's You or No One" ( Jule Styne, Sammy Cahn) – 5:00
6. "Lover Man" (Jimmy Davis, Ram Ramirez, Jimmy Sherman) – 7:22
7. "Speak Low" (Kurt Weill, Ogden Nash) – 5:38
8. "That Old Feeling" (Sammy Fain, Lew Brown) – 6:11
9. "It's You or No One" [Alternate Take] (Styne, Cahn) – 5:08 Bonus track on CD reissue
10. "Speak Low" [Alternate Take] (Weill, Nash) – 5:49 Bonus track on CD reissue
11. "That Old Feeling" [Alternate Take] (Fain, Brown) – 6:09 Bonus track on CD reissue

== Personnel ==
- Karin Krog – vocals
- Warne Marsh – tenor saxophone
- Red Mitchell – bass
