= Warne Marsh Lee Konitz: Jazz Exchange Vol. 3 =

Live album by Warne Marsh and Lee Konitz
- Released: 1985
- Recorded: December 3–5, 1975
- Venue: Jazzhus Montmartre, Copenhagen, Denmark
- Genre: Jazz
- Length: 60:04 CD reissue with bonus tracks
- Label: Storyville; SLP 4096
- Producer: Arnvid Meyer

Warne Marsh chronology
Live at the Montmartre Club: Jazz Exchange Vol. 2 (1975)	Warne Marsh Lee Konitz: Jazz Exchange Vol. 3 (1985)	The Unissued 1975 Copenhagen Studio Recordings (1975)

Lee Konitz chronology
Live at the Montmartre Club: Jazz Exchange Vol. 2 (1975)	Warne Marsh Lee Konitz: Jazz Exchange Vol. 3 (1975)	Jazz a Confronto 32 (1976)

Warne Marsh Lee Konitz: Jazz Exchange Vol. 3, is a live album by saxophonists Warne Marsh and Lee Konitz which was recorded at the Jazzhus Montmartre in late 1975 and released on the Dutch Storyville label in 1985.

== Reception ==
Professional ratings
Review scores
Source	Rating
Allmusic	4/5 stars

The Allmusic review stated "Whenever tenor-saxophonist Warne Marsh and altoist Lee Konitz got together, fireworks resulted as the two complementary saxophonists always seemed to bring out the best in each other. ... Marsh and Konitz as usual get rid of the themes quickly and then engage in advanced chordal improvisation, showing what they learned from Lennie Tristano along with their growth since the late '40s".

== Track listing ==
1. "Just Friends" (John Klenner, Sam M. Lewis) – 7:52
2. "You Don't Know What Love Is" (Gene de Paul, Don Raye) – 3:56
3. "Back Home" (Lennie Tristano) – 10:55
4. "Little Willie Leaps" (Miles Davis) – 8:00
5. "Old Folks" (Willard Robison, Dedette Lee Hill) – 4:16
6. "Au Privave" (Charlie Parker) – 10:49
7. "Chi-Chi" (Parker) – 7:14 Bonus track on CD reissue
8. "Wow" (Tristano) – 6:30 Bonus track on CD reissue

Recorded at the Café Montmatre in Copenhagen, Denmark on December 3, 1975 (track 2), December 4, 1975 (track 3) and December 5, 1975 (tracks 1 & 4–8)

== Personnel ==
- Warne Marsh – tenor saxophone
- Lee Konitz – alto saxophone
- Ole Kock Hansen – piano
- Niels-Henning Ørsted Pedersen – bass
- Svend-Erik Nørregaard (tracks 1 & 3–8), Alex Riel (track 2) – drums
