= An Image: Lee Konitz with Strings =

Studio album by Lee Konitz
- Released: 1958
- Recorded: February 6 & 8, 1958; New York City
- Genre: Jazz
- Length: 46:50
- Label: Verve; MGV 8286

Lee Konitz chronology
Tranquility (1957)	An Image: Lee Konitz with Strings (1958)	Live at the Half Note (1959)

An Image: Lee Konitz with Strings is an album by American jazz saxophonist Lee Konitz with an orchestra arranged and conducted by William Russo which was released on the Verve label in 1958.

Professional ratings
Review scores
Source	Rating
Allmusic	3/5 stars

== Track listing ==
All compositions by William Russo unless noted.

1. "'Round Midnight" (Thelonious Monk, Cootie Williams, Bernie Hanighen) – 5:19
2. "The Daffodil's Smile" – 4:04
3. "I Got It Bad (and That Ain't Good)" (Duke Ellington, Paul Francis Webster) – 2:22
4. "Music for Alto Saxophone and Strings" – 10:03
5. "What's New?" (Bob Haggart, Johnny Burke) – 2:44
6. "Blues for Our Children" – 6:55
7. "An Image of Man" – 15:23

== Personnel ==
- Lee Konitz – alto saxophone
- Unidentified orchestra arranged and conducted by William Russo including:
  - Gene Orloff – violin
  - Alan Shulman – cello
  - Lou Stein – piano
  - Billy Bauer – guitar
