= Warne Marsh Quintet: Jazz Exchange Vol. 1 =

1976 live jazz album

Warne Marsh Quintet: Jazz Exchange, Vol. 1

Live album by Warne Marsh Quintet featuring Lee Konitz & Niels-Henning Ørsted Pedersen
- Released: 1976
- Recorded: December 3, 4 & 5, 1975
- Venue: Jazzhus Montmartre, Copenhagen, Denmark
- Genre: Jazz
- Length: 61:56 CD reissue with bonus track
- Label: Storyville; SLP 1017
- Producer: Arnvid Meyer

Warne Marsh chronology
Report of the 1st Annual Symposium on Relaxed Improvisation (1972)	Warne Marsh Quintet: Jazz Exchange, Vol. 1 (1976)	Live at the Montmartre Club: Jazz Exchange Vol. 2 (1975)

Lee Konitz chronology
Windows (1975)	Warne Marsh Quintet: Jazz Exchange Vol. 1 (1975)	Live at the Montmartre Club: Jazz Exchange Vol. 2 (1975)

Warne Marsh Quintet: Jazz Exchange Vol. 1, is a live album by saxophonist Warne Marsh's Quintet featuring Lee Konitz and Niels-Henning Ørsted Pedersen which was recorded at the Jazzhus Montmartre in late 1975 and released on the Dutch Storyville label.

== Reception ==
Professional ratings
Review scores
Source	Rating
Allmusic	4/5 stars

The Allmusic review stated "The first of three releases that document a European tour undertaken by tenor saxophonist Warne Marsh and altoist Lee Konitz finds the Lennie Tristano alumni in prime form. Marsh and Konitz often thought alike musically, and this set certainly has its exciting moments. ... Highly recommended, as are the two following volumes".

== Track listing ==
1. "April" (Lennie Tristano) – 9:38
2. "Blues by Lester" (Lester Young) – 7:44
3. "Lennie-Bird" (Tristano) – 8:28
4. "You Stepped Out of a Dream" (Nacio Herb Brown, Gus Kahn) – 10:10
5. "Kary's Trance" (Lee Konitz) – 4:04
6. "Background Music" (Warne Marsh) – 10:50
7. "Subconscious-Lee" (Konitz) – 11:02 Bonus track on CD reissue
- Recorded at the Café Montmatre in Copenhagen, Denmark on December 3, 1975 (track 6), December 4, 1975 (tracks 1, 5 & 7) and December 5, 1975 (tracks 2–4)

== Personnel ==
- Warne Marsh – tenor saxophone
- Lee Konitz – alto saxophone
- Ole Kock Hansen – piano
- Niels-Henning Ørsted Pedersen – bass
- Alex Riel (track 6), Svend Erik Nørregard (tracks 1–5 & 7) – drums
