= Warne Marsh (album) =

Studio album by Warne Marsh
- Released: November 1958
- Recorded: December 12, 1957 and January 16, 1958
- Studio: NYC
- Genre: Jazz
- Length: 35:06
- Labels: Atlantic; LP-1291
- Producer: Lennie Tristano

Warne Marsh chronology
Music for Prancing (1957)	Warne Marsh (1958)	The Art of Improvising (1959)

Warne Marsh is an album by saxophonist Warne Marsh recorded in late 1957 and early 1958 which was released on the Atlantic label.

Professional ratings
Review scores
Source	Rating
Allmusic	3/5 stars

== Track listing ==
1. "Too Close for Comfort" (Jerry Bock, Larry Holofcener, George David Weiss) – 3:48
2. "Yardbird Suite" (Charlie Parker) – 5:00
3. "It's All Right With Me" (Cole Porter) – 8:14
4. "My Melancholy Baby" (Ernie Burnett, George Norton) – 7:54
5. "Just Squeeze Me (But Please Don't Tease Me)" (Duke Ellington, Lee Gaines) – 6:38
6. "Excerpt" (Warne Marsh) – 3:32

== Personnel ==
- Warne Marsh – tenor saxophone
- Ronnie Ball – piano (tracks 1, 3)
- Paul Chambers – bass
- Philly Joe Jones (tracks 1, 3), Paul Motian (tracks 2, 4–6) – drums
