= Birdtown Birds =

Live album by Joe Albany
- Released: 1973
- Recorded: April 25 & 30, 1973; Jazzhus Montmartre in Copenhagen, Denmark
- Genre: Jazz
- Length: 69:36
- Label: SteepleChase; SCS-1003
- Producer: Nils Winther

Joe Albany chronology
Proto-Bopper (1972)	Birdtown Birds (1973)	Two's Company (1973)

Birdtown Birds (subtitled Recorded Live at Montmartre) is an album by American pianist Joe Albany recorded at the Jazzhus Montmartre in 1973 and released on the SteepleChase label.

== Reception ==
Allmusic awarded the album 3 stars. The Penguin Guide to Jazz expressed a preference for Two's Company, and wrote that "Albany often sounds less radical than merely clumsy and the solo passages are rife with misfingerings".

Professional ratings
Review scores
Source	Rating
Allmusic	3/5 stars
The Penguin Guide to Jazz	2/4 stars

== Track listing ==
1. "Birdtown Birds" (Joe Albany) - 5:29
2. "Willow Weep for Me" (Ann Ronell) - 5:22
3. "Steeplechase" (Charlie Parker) - 6:22
4. "Sweet and Lovely" (Gus Arnheim, Jules LeMare, Harry Tobias) - 3:39
5. "Night and Day" (Cole Porter) - 6:35
6. "Yardbird Suite" (Parker) - 6:30 Bonus track on CD reissue
7. "All the Things You Are" (Oscar Hammerstein II, Jerome Kern) - 8:48 Bonus track on CD reissue
8. "When Lights Are Low" (Benny Carter, Spencer Williams) - 6:54 Bonus track on CD reissue
9. "C. C. Rider" (Ma Rainey) - 6:20
10. "I'm Getting Sentimental Over You" (George Bassman, Ned Washington) - 7:18
11. "'Round About Midnight" (Bernie Hanighen, Thelonious Monk, Cootie Williams) - 6:13
12. "Night in Tunisia" (Dizzy Gillespie) - 5:15

== Personnel ==
- Joe Albany – piano
- Hugo Rasmussen – bass
- Hans Nymand – drums
