= Visitation (Sam Jones album) =

Studio album by Sam Jones
- Released: 1978
- Recorded: March 20, 1978
- Genre: Jazz
- Length: 1:42:19
- Label: SteepleChase SCS 1097
- Producer: Nils Winther

Sam Jones chronology
Something in Common (1977)	Visitation (1978)	The Bassist! (1979)

Professional ratings
Review scores
Source	Rating
AllMusic	3/5 stars
The Penguin Guide to Jazz Recordings	2.5/4 stars

Visitation is a studio album by American jazz bassist Sam Jones which was recorded in March, 1978 for the Danish SteepleChase Records label. This is his ninth album as a leader. The record was re-released on CD in 1994 and as an LP in 2014 with three bonus tracks.

== Reception ==
Ken Dryden of Allmusic noted "this 1978 session, just a few years prior to his premature death, finds him leading a powerful post-bop quintet, his regular group at the time, with cornetist Terumasa Hino, tenor saxophonist Bob Berg, pianist Ronnie Mathews, and drummer Al Foster. Jones primarily plays a supporting role through a good part of the date, though he is prominently featured in the interpretation of Paul Chambers' "Visitation," while he also revisits his breezy bop vehicle "Del Sasser." Reviewer of Jazz Journal wrote "this latest album by Sam Jones is well up to standard....an excellent band....As for Sam Jones, he is in splendid form on all tracks, perhaps inspired by the feeling that he has managed to gather about him a cracking good band."

== Track listing ==
No.	Title	Writer(s)	Length
1.	"Occurrance [sic]"	Tom Harrell	5:50
2.	"Visitation"	Paul Chambers	6:35
3.	"Jean Marie"	Ron Mathews	6:53
4.	"Before You"	Tom Harrell	5:55
5.	"My Funny Valentine"	Richard Rodgers	5:10
6.	"Del Sasser"	Sam Jones	8:30

== Personnel ==
Band

- Ronnie Mathews – baby grand piano
- Sam Jones – bass
- Terumasa Hino – cornet
- Al Foster – drums
- Bob Berg – tenor saxophone

Production

- Per Grunnet – cover
- Jørgen Frigård – liner notes
- Freddy Hansson – mixing
- Nils Winther – producer, photography
- Elvin Campbell – recording
