= Two Days in the Life of... =

Studio album by Warne Marsh
- Released: 1987
- Recorded: June 4–5, 1987
- Studio: Backroom, Sherman Oaks, CA
- Genre: Jazz
- Length: 39:32
- Label: Interplay; IP-8602
- Producer: Toshiya Taenaka

Warne Marsh chronology
Back Home (1986)	Two Days in the Life of... (1987)	For the Time Being (1987)

Two Days in the Life of... is an album by the saxophonist Warne Marsh, recorded in 1987 and released on the Interplay label.

== Reception ==
Professional ratings
Review scores
Source	Rating
AllMusic	4/5 stars
The Penguin Guide to Jazz	3/4 stars

AllMusic states: "This was one of tenor saxophonist Warne Marsh's last records. Fortunately his musical talents were unimpaired and he sounds in prime form".

== Track listing ==
All compositions by Warne Marsh except where noted.

1. "Initially K.C." – 8:08
2. "Geraldyne's Arrangement" – 6:45
3. "All God's Chillun Got Rhythm" (Bronislaw Kaper, Walter Jurmann, Gus Kahn) – 5:09
4. "Blues Warne-ing" (Ron Escheté) – 4:10
5. "Asterix" – 9:45
6. "Jason's Judgement" – 5:35
- Recorded at Backroom Recording Studio, Sherman Oaks, CA, on June 4, 1987 (tracks 1 & 3) and June 5, 1987 (tracks 2 & 4–6)

== Personnel ==
- Warne Marsh – tenor saxophone
- Ron Escheté – guitar
- Jim Hughart – bass
- Sherman Ferguson – drums
