= Phil DeGreg =

American jazz musician

Phil DeGreg (born 1954) is an American jazz pianist and professor.

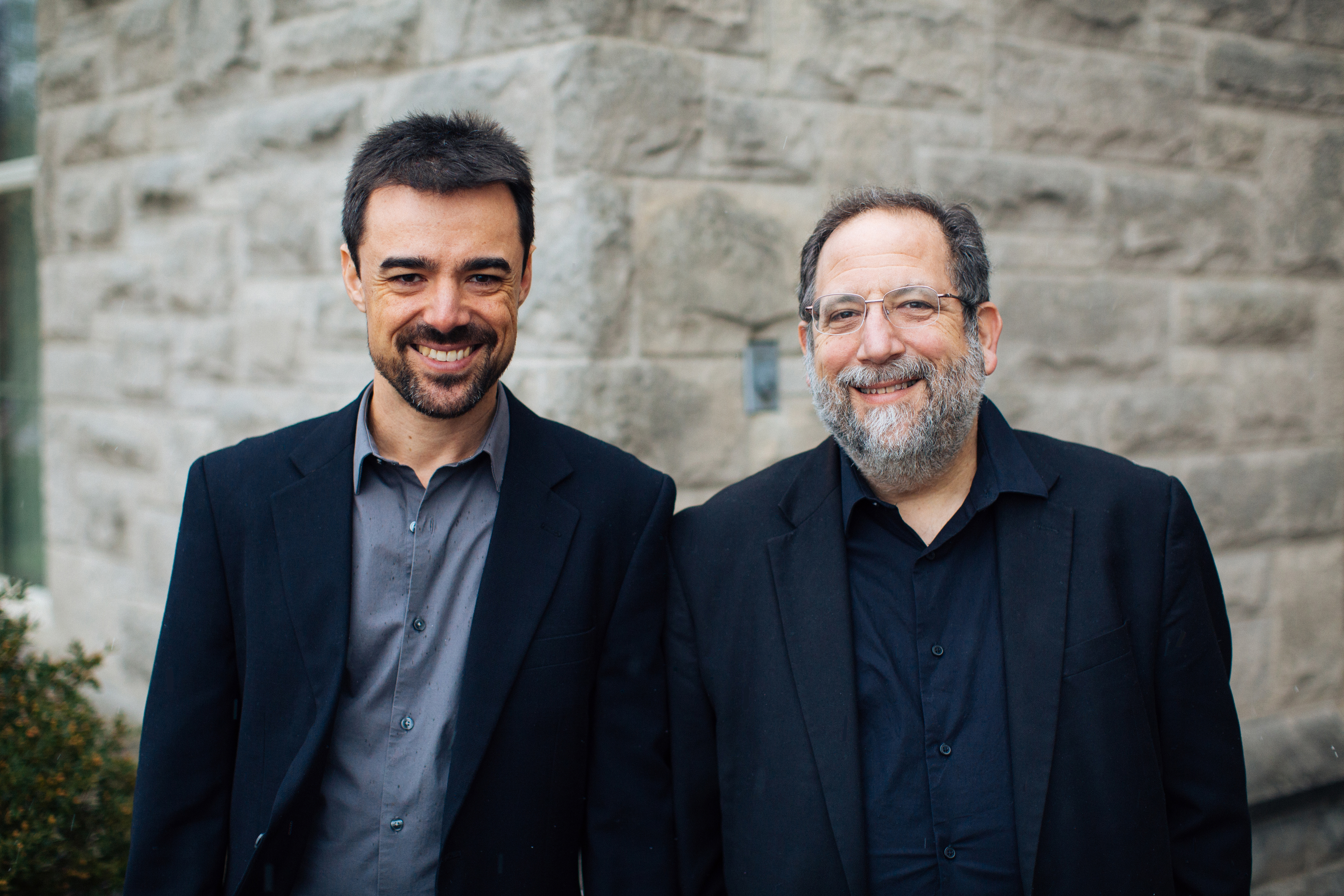
DeGreg (right)

== Life and career ==
After graduating from St. Xavier High School in Cincinnati in 1972, Phil DeGreg studied psychology at Yale University. Later, he played in a folk rock duo in New Haven–area coffee shops. Influenced by the music of Bill Evans, he switched to jazz and played in a student jazz band at Yale. Eventually, he moved to Kansas City and joined the local jazz scene. He then studied at the North Texas State University College of Music from 1979 to 1982, completing a master's degree and performing and recording as a member of the One O'Clock Lab Band. He was briefly a member of Woody Herman's big band. DeGreg returned to Cincinnati when his daughter was born.

In 1987, he became a lecturer in the Jazz Studies Division at the University of Cincinnati – College-Conservatory of Music (CCM) and wrote a textbook, Jazz Keyboard Harmony(1994). In addition to his lecturing, DeGreg recorded a series of albums in the 1990s with musicians Joe LaBarbera, Tim Ries, Don Braden, Drew Gress, and Randy Johnston. In addition, he has performed concerts with J. J. Johnson (Live in Concert, 2007). Since 1991, DeGreg has been a professor of Jazz Studies at the University of Cincinnati.

== Selected recordings ==
- The Green Gate (1999)
- Whirl Away (2000)
- Table For Three (2003)
- Brasilia (2004)
- TranZatlantic Interplay (2004) with Dave Cliff
- Trio Con Brio (2005)
- Hymnprovisation (2007)
- Down the Middle (2007) with Joe LaBarbera, Tom Warrington
- Amazonas (2010)
- Melodious Monk (2011) with Kim Pensyl
