= Swingin' on the Town =

Studio album by Roy Eldridge
- Released: 1960
- Recorded: June 2 & 3, 1960; New York City
- Genre: Jazz
- Length: 36:37
- Label: Verve; MGV 8389
- Producer: Norman Granz

Roy Eldridge chronology
| That Warm Feeling (1957) | Swingin' on the Town (1960) | Saturday Night Fish Fry (1962) |

Swingin' on the Town is an album by American jazz trumpeter Roy Eldridge recorded in 1960 and released on the Verve label.

== Reception ==
Professional ratings
Review scores
| Source | Rating |
|---|---|
| Allmusic | 4/5 stars |

Allmusic awarded the album 4 stars stating "Eldridge is the focus here, and his performances are supple, swinging and charming. He doesn't do anything out of the ordinary, but he delivers the expected with grace. Not a major album in his catalog, but certainly an enjoyable one".

== Track listing ==
1. "Bossa Nova" (Roy Eldridge) - 2:47
2. "The Way You Look Tonight" (Jerome Kern, Dorothy Fields) - 2:26
3. "Sweet Sue, Just You" (Victor Young, Will J. Harris) - 2:28
4. "I've Got a Crush on You" (George Gershwin, Ira Gershwin) - 2:25
5. "When I Grow Too Old to Dream" (Sigmund Romberg, Oscar Hammerstein II) - 3:03
6. "Crème de Menthe" (Erroll Garner) - 2:40
7. "Honeysuckle Rose" (Fats Waller, Andy Razaf) - 4:18
8. "All the Things You Are" (Kern, Hammerstein II) - 3:30
9. "Easy Living" (Ralph Rainger, Leo Robin) - 3:48
10. "But Not for Me" (Gershwin, Gershwin) - 3:18
11. "Song of the Islands" (Charles E. King) - 3:07
12. "Misty" (Garner, Johnny Burke) - 2:45

== Personnel ==
- Roy Eldridge - trumpet
- Ronnie Ball - piano
- Benny Moten - bass
- Eddie Locke - drums
