= Bird Lives! (Joe Albany album) =

Studio album by Joe Albany
- Released: 1979
- Recorded: January 4, 1979
- Studio: RPM Sound Studio, NYC
- Genre: Jazz
- Length: 44:26
- Label: Interplay; IP-7723
- Producer: Toshiya Taenaka

Joe Albany chronology
Live in Paris (1977)	Bird Lives! (1979)	Portrait of an Artist (1982)

Bird Lives! (also released as Now's the Time) is an album by pianist Joe Albany, recorded in 1979 and released on the Interplay label.

== Reception ==
Professional ratings
Review scores
Source	Rating
All About Jazz	4/5 stars
AllMusic	4.5/5 stars
The Penguin Guide to Jazz	3/4 stars

AllMusic's Scott Yanow said: "Joe Albany's next-to-last recording features the veteran bop pianist performing seven Charlie Parker compositions, his own 'Charlie Parker Blues' and the standard They Can't Take That Away From Me' in a superb trio ... This was the perfect setting for Albany and he comes up with fresh ideas ... easily recommended to bop lovers". On All About Jazz, C. Michael Bailey stated: "Albany, who had a reputation for being hard to corral musically in the confines of a trio, plays in very good form in the setting". The Penguin Guide to Jazz described it as "one of the best sets Albany managed to record".

== Track listing ==
All compositions by Charlie Parker except where noted.

1. "Now's the Time" – 4:15
2. "Yardbird Suite" – 4:28
3. "Bluebird" – 4:03
4. "Charlie Parker Blues" (Joe Albany, Art Davis, Roy Haynes) – 6:06
5. "Little Suede Shoes" – 4:39
6. "Billie's Bounce" – 4:09
7. "Confirmation" – 5:19
8. "Barbados" – 5:02
9. "They Can't Take That Away from Me" (George Gershwin, Ira Gershwin ) – 6:25

== Personnel ==
- Joe Albany – piano
- Art Davis – bass
- Roy Haynes – drums
