= Interplay Records =

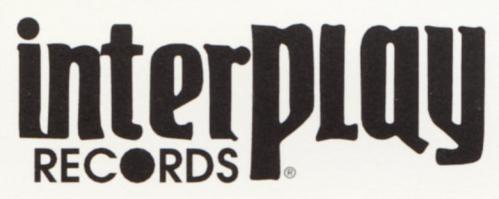
- Founded: 1977
- Founder: Toshiya Taenaka
- Genre: Jazz
- Country of origin: U.S.
- Location: Los Angeles

Interplay Records is a jazz record company and label founded by Toshiya Taenaka in association with Fred Norseworthy in Los Angeles in 1977 which released several notable albums by Warne Marsh, Al Haig, Sal Mosca, Horace Tapscott, and Ted Curson. The label was named after an album released on Taenaka's short-lived label, Seabreeze Records; Al Haig's Interplay.

== Discography ==
P	Artist	Album	Recorded
7707	Al Haig	A Portrait of Bud Powell	1977
7708	Claude Williamson	Holography	1977
7709	Warne Marsh	Warne Out	1977
7710	June Christy	Impromptu	1977
7711	Lou Levy	Tempus Fugue-It	1977
7712	Sal Mosca	Music	1977
7713	Al Haig	Serendipity	1977
7714	Horace Tapscott	Songs of the Unsung	1978
7715	Freddie Redd	Straight Ahead!	1977
7716	Dizzy Reece & Ted Curson	Blowin' Away	1978
7717	Claude Williamson	New Departure	1978
7718	Art Pepper	Among Friends	1978
7719	Nick Brignola	New York Bound!	1978
7720	Sam Jones	The Bassist!	1979
7721	Bill Perkins	Confluence	1978
7722	Ted Curson	The Trio	1979
7723	Joe Albany	Bird Lives!	1979
7724	Horace Tapscott	Horace Tapscott in New York	1979
7725	Warne Marsh and Sal Mosca	How Deep, How High	1976 and 1979
7726	Sam Jones	Something New	1979
7727	Claude Williamson	La Fiesta	1979
7728	Art Davis	Reemergence	1980
7729	Ted Curson	I Heard Mingus	1980
8601	Warne Marsh and Susan Chen	Warne Marsh & Susan Chen	1985-86
8602	Warne Marsh	Two Days in the Life of...	1987
8603	Billy Bauer	Anthology	1959-69
8604	Warne Marsh	Posthumous	1985
8605	Walter Bishop Jr.	Just in Time	1988
8606	Bill Perkins	Remembrance of Dino's	1986
8607	Bill Warfield	New York City Jazz	1988
8608	Pepper Adams	California Cookin'	1983
8609	Warne Marsh and Susan Chen	Ballad for You	1985
8610	Rolf Ericson & Lex Jasper	My Foolish Heart	1989
8611	Bill Perkins & Frank Strazzeri	Two As One	1990
8612	Bill Perkins	Frame of Mind	1993
8613	Dick Morgan	Drive, Passion, Unpredictable	1994
8614	Leo Maiberger	Mad City Jazz	1994
8615	Keith Greko	Journey	1995
9001	Walter Bishop Jr.	Ode to Bird	1989
9002	Gildo Mahones	Gildo Mahones Trio	1990
9003	Gil Coggins	Gil's Mood	1990
9004	Freddie Redd	Extemporaneous	1978
