= Portrait of an Artist (album) =

Studio album by Joe Albany
- Released: 1982
- Recorded: 1982
- Studios: CBS Studios, New York, NY and Ocean Way Recording, Hollywood CA
- Genre: Jazz
- Length: 43:09
- Labels: Elektra/Musician; 60161
- Producers: Mike Berniker, Jeffrey Weber

Joe Albany chronology
Bird Lives! (1979)	Portrait of an Artist (1982)

Portrait of an Artist is the final studio album by pianist Joe Albany, recorded in 1982 and released on the Elektra/Musician label.

== Reception ==
Professional ratings
Review scores
Source	Rating
AllMusic	4/5 stars

Bob Blumenthal wrote in The Boston Phoenix that the album "is somber and quirky on the surface, a demanding recital rich in Albany's love of bold harmonies and inflections. AllMusic's Scott Yanow said: "This mostly ballad-oriented trio set ... Albany, whose career (especially on records) did not really get going until his final decade, is in generally good form ... The album concludes with a brief interview that sums up some aspects of his episodic life".

== Track listing ==
1. "Autumn in New York" (Vernon Duke) – 6:33
2. "Guess I'll Hang My Tears Out to Dry" (Jule Styne, Sammy Cahn) – 4:46
3. "For the Little Guy" (Joe Albany) – 6:42
4. "They Say It's Wonderful" (Irving Berlin) – 5:07
5. "Too Late Now" (Burton Lane, Alan Jay Lerner) – 5:30
6. "Confirmation" (Charlie Parker) – 5:38
7. "Ruby, My Dear" (Thelonious Monk) – 3:45
8. A Conversation with Joe Albany – 4:50

== Personnel ==
- Joe Albany – piano
- Al Gafa – guitar
- George Duvivier – bass
- Charlie Persip – drums
