= Solemn Meditation =

Studio album by Paul Bley Quartet
- Released: 1958
- Recorded: August 21, 1957
- Studio: Audio Arts Studio, Hollywood, California
- Genre: Jazz
- Length: 33:36
- Label: GNP Crescendo; GNPS 31
- Producer: Gene Norman

Paul Bley chronology
Paul Bley (1954)	Solemn Meditation (1958)	Live at the Hilcrest Club 1958 (1958)

Solemn Meditation is the third album led by jazz pianist Paul Bley featuring tracks recorded in 1957 and released on the GNP Crescendo label.

== Reception ==
Professional ratings
Review scores
Source	Rating
Allmusic	3/5 stars
The Rolling Stone Jazz Record Guide	4/5 stars

Allmusic awarded the album 3 stars stating "This early quartet date from pianist Paul Bley is somewhat historic because it was the recording debut of both bassist Charlie Haden and vibraphonist Dave Pike... Bley explores a lot of unlikely material in an early postbop manner".

== Track listing ==
All compositions by Paul Bley except as indicated

1. "Birk's Works" (Dizzy Gillespie) - 6:05
2. "O Plus One" (Carla Borg) - 3:15
3. "Porgy" (Jimmy McHugh) - 3:40
4. "Solemn Meditation" (Sam Gill) - 3:33
5. "I Remember Harlem" (Roy Eldridge, Bob Astor, George Williams) - 3:41
6. "Drum Two" - 3:05
7. "Everywhere" (Bill Harris) - 4:03
8. "Beau Diddley" - 5:33
9. "Persian Village" (Dave Pike) 3:16

== Personnel ==
- Paul Bley - piano
- Dave Pike - vibraphone
- Charlie Haden - bass
- Lennie McBrowne - drums
