= Joe Albany =

American modern jazz pianist (1924–1988)

- Born: Joseph Albani; January 24, 1924; Atlantic City, New Jersey, U.S.
- Died: January 12, 1988 (aged 63) New York City
- Genres: Jazz
- Occupation: Musician
- Instrument: Piano
- Formerly of: Benny Carter; Charlie Parker; Miles Davis

Joe Albany (born Joseph Albani; January 24, 1924 – January 12, 1988) was an American modern jazz pianist who played bebop with Charlie Parker as well as being a leader on his own recordings.

== Life and career ==
Born in Atlantic City, New Jersey, Albany studied piano as a child and, by 1943, was working on the West Coast in Benny Carter's orchestra. In 1946, Lester Young recorded with Albany as his pianist, for Aladdin Records. Also that year, he played at least once with Parker and then 20-year-old Miles Davis. He continued for a few years afterward, and in 1957 recorded an album for Riverside with an unusual trio line-up with saxophonist Warne Marsh and Bob Whitlock on bass, omitting a drummer. Despite that, most of the 1950s and 1960s saw him battling a heroin addiction, or living in seclusion in Europe. He also had several unsuccessful marriages in this period. He returned to jazz in the 1970s and played on more than ten albums. He died of respiratory failure and cardiac arrest in New York City at the age of 63.

Albany was the focus of a 1980 documentary titled, Joe Albany... A Jazz Life. His daughter Amy-Jo wrote a memoir about her father called Low Down: Junk, Jazz, and Other Fairy Tales from Childhood. The book was adapted for the screen and released in 2014 as the biopic Low Down. Joe was also the biological father to Benjamin David Goldberg, who was adopted by another family shortly after being born. Benjamin David was also a musician, who studied percussion at Juilliard, played for Broadway shows and was in the US Army Band.

== Discography ==
Year recorded	Title	Label	Notes
1957	The Right Combination	Riverside	Trio, with Warne Marsh (tenor sax), Bob Whitlock (bass)
1966	Portrait of a Legend	Fresh Sound	Trio, with Leroy Vinnegar (bass), Frank Capp (drums)
1971	Joe Albany at Home	Spotlite	Solo piano
1972	Proto-Bopper	Revelation	Trio, with Bob Whitlock (bass), Nick Martinis and Jerry McKenzie (drums; separately)
1973	Birdtown Birds	SteepleChase	Trio, with Hugo Rasmussen (bass), Hans Nymand (drums); in concert
1973	An Evening With Joe Albany	SteepleChase	solo piano
1973	An Evening With Joe Albany vol. 2	SteepleChase	solo piano
1973	Two's Company	SteepleChase	Duo, with Niels-Henning Ørsted Pedersen (bass)
1974	Joe Albany & Joe Venuti	Horo	Quintet, with Joe Venuti (violin), Joe Cusumano (guitar), Giovanni Tommaso (bass), Bruno Biriaco (drums); also released by Parlophone in 1977
1976	This Is for My Friends	Musica	
1976	Epiphany	Blue Jack	Solo piano
1977	Plays George Gershwin & Burton Lane	Musica	
1977	The Albany Touch	Sea Breeze	Solo piano
1977	Live in Paris	Fresh Sound	Trio, with Alby Cullaz (bass), Aldo Romano (drums)
1979	Bird Lives!	Interplay	Trio, with Art Davis (bass), Roy Haynes (drums)
1982	Portrait of an Artist	Elektra/Musician	Trio/Quartet, with George Duvivier (bass), Charlie Persip (drums), Al Gafa (guitar)
