= All Music (album) =

Studio album by Warne Marsh
- Released: 1976
- Recorded: February 20 & 21, 1976
- Studios: Sound, Chicago, IL
- Genre: Jazz
- Length: 42:37
- Labels: Nessa; N-7
- Producer: Chuck Nessa

Warne Marsh chronology
The Unissued Copenhagen Studio Recordings (1975)	All Music (1976)	Lee Konitz Meets Warne Marsh Again (1976)

All Music is an album by saxophonist Warne Marsh, recorded in 1976 and released on the Nessa label.

== Reception ==
Professional ratings
Review scores
Source	Rating
AllMusic	4/5 stars
The Penguin Guide to Jazz Recordings	3/4 stars
The Rolling Stone Jazz Record Guide	4/5 stars

The AllMusic review commented: "The mid-'70s were a prime time for tenor saxophonist Warne Marsh, and this 1976 studio session is one of his best dates from this portion of his career. ... Marsh's sophisticated solo work shines no matter what the setting". The Rolling Stone Jazz Record Guide said: "All Music is one of the best places to hear Marsh at work". In JazzTimes Chris Kelsey wrote: "The late tenor saxophonist Warne Marsh played with a spontaneous, seat-of-the-pants creativity that puts today’s young, book-learned jazzers to shame. ... All Music (Nessa) is a straightahead blowing date from 1976 featuring Marsh backed by a redoubtable rhythm section ... Both Levy and Hanna are top-drawer bop stylists, and Marsh is one of the all-time greats at the top of his game. Definitely not just for Tristo-philes or Marsh completists".

== Track listing ==
1. "I Have a Good One for You" (Warne Marsh) – 5:29
2. "Background Music" (Marsh) – 4:32
3. "On Purpose" (Lou Levy) 7:07
4. "317 East 32nd" (Lennie Tristano) – 6:57
5. "Lunarcy" (Levy) – 9:02
6. "Easy Living" (Leo Robin, Ralph Rainger) – 4:09
7. "Subconscious-Lee" (Lee Konitz) – 5:04
8. "On Purpose" [alternate take 14] (Levy) – 5:44 Bonus track on CD reissue
9. "A Time for Love" (Johnny Mandel) – 5:20 Bonus track on CD reissue
10. "I Have a Good One for You" [alternate take 2 & 3] (Marsh) – 0:47 Bonus track on CD reissue
11. "I Have a Good One for You" [alternate take 4] (Marsh) – 6:48 Bonus track on CD reissue
12. "I Have a Good One for You" [alternate take 5] (Marsh) – 5:29 Bonus track on CD reissue
13. "I Have a Good One for You" [alternate take 6] (Marsh) – 5:49 Bonus track on CD reissue
14. "I Have a Good One for You" [alternate take 9] (Marsh) – 5:55 Bonus track on CD reissue

== Personnel ==
- Warne Marsh – tenor saxophone
- Lou Levy – piano, electric piano
- Fred Atwood – bass
- Jake Hanna – drums
