= Cedric West =

Burmese born English jazz guitarist (1918-1997)

Cedric Herbert West (9 December 1918 – 16 October 1997) was a British guitarist and trombonist. He was born in Yangon, Burma, where he began playing guitar from the late 1930s and where he grew up with Ike Isaacs. He left Burma in 1942 following the Japanese invasion, moving to India, where he performed as a guitarist, and as a member of Teddy Weatherford's band on guitar and later trombone at the Grand Hotel, Calcutta.

In 1947 West arrived in England, where he formed his own bands and took part in mainstream sessions with Kenny Baker, Bertie King, Bruce Turner, Al Fairweather and pianist Eddie Thompson. He became renowned for his thumb-picking style. In the 1960s he formed the Cedric West Guitar Ensemble, whose other members were guitarists Laurie Wise, Dick Abel and Len Argent, bassist Ken O'Donnell and drummer Ronnie Lord. This group recorded two albums with Denis Preston at Lansdowne Studios in 1964 and 1965.

West worked with BBC orchestras and was a member of the Dave Lee Band, the resident band for the satirical television series That Was the Week That Was. From the late 1960s he became more involved in television and radio work.

He retired from broadcasting in 1984, but continued as a freelance player into the 1990s, sometimes in a quartet co-led by Dave Cliff. There is a video of him playing a duo version of Indian Summer with Joe Pass at his home in Essex. West died in Essex in October, 1997.

== Recordings ==
- West Meets East, the Cedric West Guitar Ensemble, Columbia 33SX 1617 (1964)
- Bach Goes West, the Cedric West Guitar Ensemble, World Record Club T641 (1965)
