= Back Home (Warne Marsh album) =

Studio album by Warne Marsh Quartet & Quintet
- Released: 1986
- Recorded: March 31, 1986
- Studio: Van Gelder Studio, Englewood Cliffs, NJ
- Genre: Jazz
- Length: 70:58 CD reissue with bonus tracks
- Label: Criss Cross Jazz; 1023
- Producer: Gerry Teekens

Warne Marsh chronology
Warne Marsh & Susan Chen (1985)	Back Home (1986)	Two Days in the Life of... (1987)

Back Home, is an album by saxophonist Warne Marsh, recorded in 1986 and released on the Dutch Criss Cross Jazz label.

== Reception ==
Professional ratings
Review scores
Source	Rating
AllMusic	4.5/5 stars
The Penguin Guide to Jazz	3/4 stars

The AllMusic review states that "the tenor master and Tristano disciple works through a set of tunes that, in true Tristano fashion, are built entirely upon the harmonic foundations of popular standards... Marsh's peculiar linear logic and behind-the-beat phrasing are the aural equivalent of well-aged scotch, and his rapport with Barry Harris represents a felicitous union of straight bebop and one of its most enigmatic tributaries, the Tristano school".

== Track listing ==
All compositions by Warne Marsh except where noted

1. "Leave Me" (Lennie Tristano) – 5:16
2. "See Me Now, If You Could" – 5:41
3. "Two Not One" (Tristano) – 5:08
4. "Big Leaps for Lester" – 4:57
5. "Back Home" (Tristano) – 8:04
6. "Heads Up" – 5:31
7. "Good Bait" (Tadd Dameron, Count Basie) – 8:11
8. "Rhythmically Speaking" – 4:31
9. "Joy Spring" (Clifford Brown) – 7:26
10. "Big Leaps for Lester" [alternate take] – 4:43 Bonus track on CD reissue
11. "Good Bait" [alternate take] (Dameron, Basie) – 6:34 Bonus track on CD reissue
12. "Back Home" [alternate take] (Tristano) – 4:48 Bonus track on CD reissue

== Personnel ==
- Warne Marsh, Jimmy Halperin (tracks 1, 3, 5 & 12) – tenor saxophone
- Barry Harris – piano
- David Williams – bass
- Albert Heath – drums
