= Dave Cliff =

British jazz guitarist

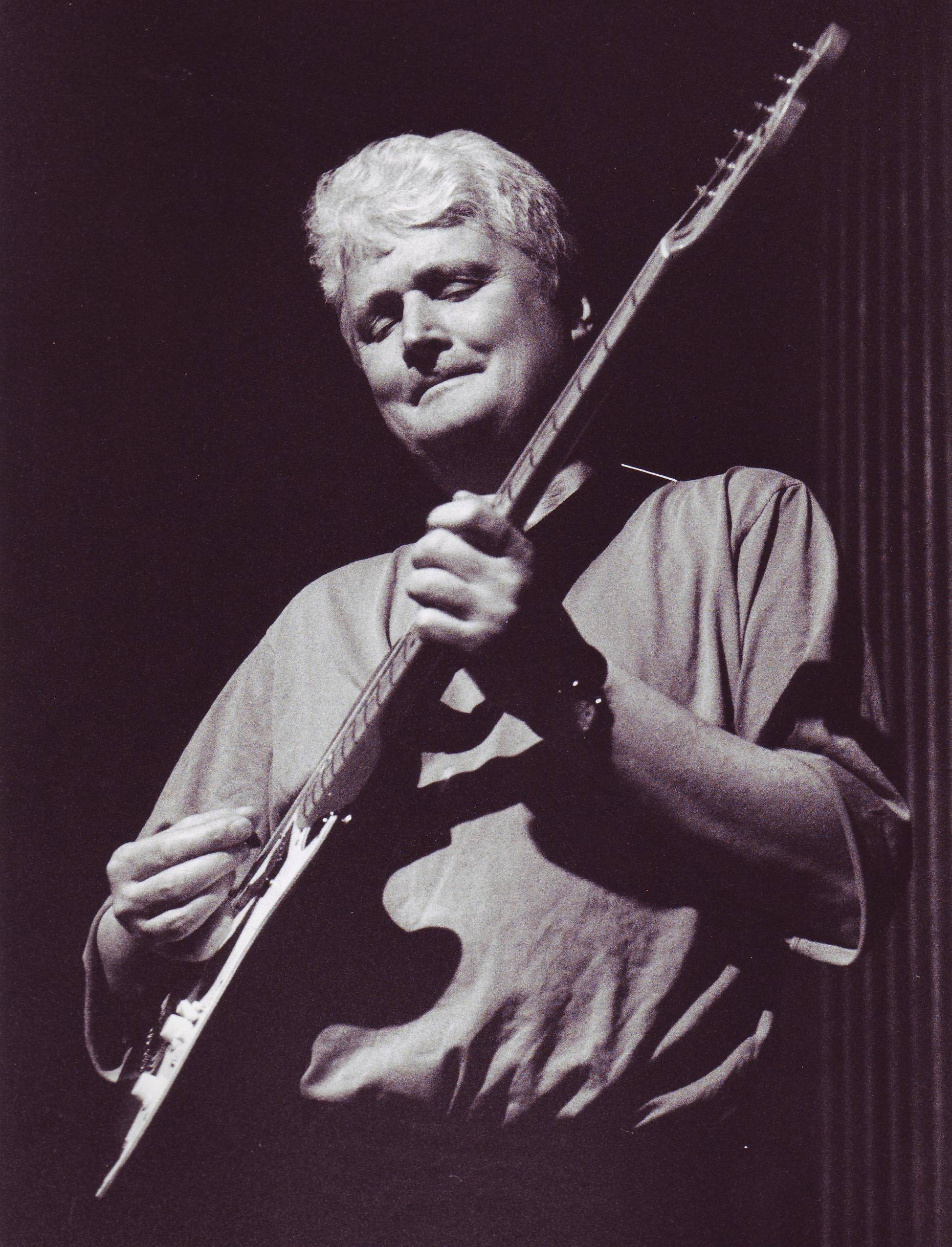

Background information
- Born: David John Cliff; 25 June 1944 (age 82); Hexham, Northumberland, England
- Genre: Jazz
- Occupation: Musician
- Instrument: Guitar
- Years active: 1970s–present

Dave Cliff (born 25 June 1944) is a British jazz guitarist.

== Career ==
Cliff was born in Hexham, Northumberland. In 1967, he moved to Leeds and gained a diploma in jazz studies from Leeds College of Music while studying with bassist Peter Ind and Bernie Cash. Ind became a mentor to him. At Leeds Cliff was influenced by listening to the music of Lennie Tristano. In 1971, after moving to London, Cliff became established on the local scene. During 1976–1977 he toured the UK with Lee Konitz and Warne Marsh, both students of Tristano and familiar to Ind. During the next year Cliff toured the UK with Soprano Summit (Kenny Davern and Bob Wilber). Beginning in the 1980s, he worked increasingly as a freelance musician.

He recorded his first solo album, The Right Time, in 1987 with Geoff Simkins on alto saxophone. With Simkins he also recorded West Coast Blues (1991) (cassette only), Sippin' at Bell's (1994) and The Music of Tadd Dameron (1996).

Cliff has appeared frequently at Ronnie Scott's Jazz Club in varied settings. He has worked with Harry Allen, Mike Carr, Buddy Childers, Richie Cole, Eddie "Lockjaw" Davis, Phil DeGreg, Georgie Fame, Allan Ganley, Herb Geller, Scott Hamilton, Ken Peplowski, Bucky Pizzarelli, Irene Reid, Spike Robinson, Nina Simone, Lew Tabackin, Warren Vaché and Cedric West.

In 1998 Cliff won the BT Jazz Awards in the guitar category.

Around 2015 Cliff retired from professional playing on the grounds of Parkinson's disease.

== Influences ==
Cliff's influences on guitar include Charlie Christian, Wes Montgomery, and Lennie Tristano, whose influence he encountered when working and studying with Peter Ind.

== Teaching ==
Cliff has taught at Royal Birmingham Conservatoire, Royal Welsh College of Music & Drama in Cardiff, Trinity College of Music in London, Original UK Jazz Summer School, Jamey Aebersold Summer School in London, and Kristiansand in Norway.

== Discography ==
=== As leader ===
- 1987 The Right Time with Geoff Simkins (Miles Music)
- 1991 West Coast Blues with Geoff Simkins
- 1995 Sipping at Bells with Geoff Simkins (Spotlite)
- 1997 The Dave Cliff Geoff Simkins 5 Play the Music of Tadd Dameron with Geoff Simkins (Spotlite)
- 1998 Tribute to Paul Desmond with Mark Ramsden (33 Records)
- 1998 When Lights Are Low (Zephyr)
- 2004 Tranzatlantic Interplay with Phil DeGreg (Strugglebaby)

=== As sideman ===
With Warne Marsh

- 1977 Live at the Montmartre Club: Jazz Exchange Vol. 2 with Lee Konitz (Storyville, 1977)

With Bob Wilber

- 1994 the warren vache quintet: Jazz at the Amerika Haus Hamburg, Volume 2 Nagel-Heyer Records
- 1995 The Hamburg Concert
- 1995 Tribute to Coleman Hawkins
- 1995 A Man and His Music

With others

- 1985 The Dirty Bopper, Bruce Turner
- 1989 Porcelain, Julia Fordham
- 1997 Christmas Love Song, Scott Hamilton
- 1998 Days of Wine and Roses, Tony Coe
- 2004 The Anglo/American/Scottish Connection, Jimmy Deuchar
- 2008 Conversation, Geoff Simkins

== Sources ==
John Chilton, Who's Who of British Jazz, London: Cassell, 1997. ISBN 0-8264-7234-6
