= Something New (Sam Jones album) =

Studio album by Sam Jones 12 Piece Band
- Released: 1979
- Recorded: June 4, 1979
- Studio: Sound Ideas Studios, NYC
- Genre: Jazz
- Length: 34:47
- Label: Interplay; IP-7726
- Producer: John Brechler, Toshiya Taenaka

Sam Jones chronology
The Bassist! (1979)	Something New (1979)

Something New, is an album by jazz bassist Sam Jones' 12 Piece Band recorded in 1979 and released on the Interplay label.

== Reception ==
Professional ratings
Review scores
Source	Rating
Allmusic	4.5/5 stars

The Allmusic review called it "An excellent jazz orchestra that has been long forgotten since Sam Jones' death in 1981" and states "Many all-stars were in the band".

== Track listing ==
1. "Unit Seven" (Sam Jones) – 8:12
2. "Stella by Starlight" (Victor Young, Ned Washington) – 9:05
3. "Tropical Delight" (Pete Yellin) – 5:39
4. "Antigua" (Bob Mintzer) – 6:06
5. "Tender Touch" (Ernie Wilkins) – 5:45

== Personnel ==
- Sam Jones – bass, director
- Spanky Davis, John Eckert, Richard Williams – trumpet
- Sam Burtis, Dick Griffin – trombone
- Ronnie Cuber, Bob Mintzer, Harold Vick, Pete Yellin – reeds
- Fred Hersch – piano
- Mickey Roker – drums
