= Max Bolleman =

Dutch musician

Max Bolleman (born 1944 in Venlo, Netherlands) is a Dutch jazz drummer, audio engineer, and record producer.

== Career ==
Bolleman grew up in Amsterdam. At 15, he started playing drums. He worked with Clark Terry, Cannonball Adderley, Bud Powell, Curtis Fuller, René Thomas, Clifford Jordan, Joe Farrell, and Don Byas.

Bolleman started a recording studio named Studio 44 in Monster, the Netherlands. Gerry Teekens chose him to record Warne Marsh for Criss Cross Jazz. He also recorded Art Blakey, Elvin Jones, Philly Joe Jones, and McCoy Tyner. He worked with Rudy Van Gelder to record the Timeless All Stars. Bolleman divided his time between audio engineering and optometry.

After more than 25 years Bolleman closed his Monster studio and began recording at his home in Belgium. In 1989 he received the Export Award from the Dutch government.
