= The Bassist! =

Studio album by Sam Jones Trio
- Released: 1979
- Recorded: January 3, 1979
- Studio: RPM Sound Studios, NYC
- Genre: Jazz
- Length: 34:47
- Label: Interplay; IP-7720
- Producer: Toshiya Taenaka

Sam Jones chronology
Visitation (1978)	The Bassist! (1979)	Something New (1979)

The Bassist!, is an album by jazz bassist Sam Jones recorded in 1979 and released on the Interplay label.

== Reception ==
Professional ratings
Review scores
Source	Rating
Allmusic	4/5 stars

The Allmusic review called it "well played post-bop music" and states "Virtually all of Sam Jones' occasional dates as a leader featured him in a purely supportive role with a medium-size all-star group. This set is a bit different, for Jones is often in the forefront, heading a trio".

== Track listing ==
All compositions by Sam Jones except where noted

1. "Rhythm-a-Ning" (Thelonious Monk) – 5:27
2. "Lily" – 6:07
3. "Seascape" (Kenny Barron) – 7:02
4. "Tragic Magic" (Barron) – 6:02
5. "The Hymn of Scorpio" – 5:05
6. "Bittersweet" – 5:04

== Personnel ==
- Sam Jones – bass
- Kenny Barron – piano
- Keith Copeland – drums
