= Lee Konitz Meets Warne Marsh Again =

Live album by Lee Konitz and Warne Marsh
- Released: 1977
- Recorded: May 21, 1976
- Venue: Ronnie Scott's Jazz Club, London, England
- Genre: Jazz
- Label: Pausa; PR 7019
- Producer: Franco Fayenz

Lee Konitz chronology
Jazz a Confronto 32 (1976)	Lee Konitz Meets Warne Marsh Again (1977)	The Lee Konitz Nonet (1976)

Warne Marsh chronology
All Music (1976)	Lee Konitz Meets Warne Marsh Again (1976)	Tenor Gladness (1976)

Lee Konitz Meets Warne Marsh Again is a live album by American jazz saxophonists Lee Konitz and Warne Marsh recorded at Ronnie Scott's Jazz Club in 1976 and released on the Pausa label.

== Reception ==
Professional ratings
Review scores
Source	Rating
Allmusic	4/5 stars
The Rolling Stone Jazz Record Guide	4/5 stars

Scott Yanow of Allmusic wrote: "Their repertoire (common chord changes) and cool jazz styles are not that surprising but both of the saxophonists sound quite inspired to be in each other's presence; they always brought out the best in each other. The melodic and boppish improvisations reward repeated listenings".

== Track listing ==
1. "Two Not One" (Lennie Tristano)
2. "You Go to My Head" (J. Fred Coots, Haven Gillespie)
3. "Star Eyes" (Gene de Paul, Don Raye)
4. "All The Things You Are" (Jerome Kern, Oscar Hammerstein II)
5. "My Old Flame" (Sam Coslow, Arthur Johnston)
6. "Sound Lee" (Lee Konitz)

== Personnel ==
- Lee Konitz – alto saxophone
- Warne Marsh – tenor saxophone
- Peter Ind – bass
- Al Levitt – drums
