= Teddy Weatherford =

American jazz pianist

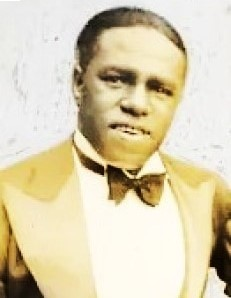
- Teddy Weatherford (1926)

Background information
- Born: October 11, 1903; Pocahontas, Virginia, United States
- Died: April 25, 1945 (aged 41) Calcutta, India
- Genres: Jazz
- Occupation: Musician
- Instrument: Piano

Teddy Weatherford (October 11, 1903 − April 25, 1945) was an American jazz pianist and an accomplished stride pianist.

== Biography ==
Weatherford was born in Pocahontas, Virginia, and was raised in neighboring Bluefield, West Virginia. From 1915 through 1920, he lived in New Orleans, Louisiana, where he learned to play jazz piano. He then moved to Chicago, Illinois, in 1922 where he worked with such bands as that of Erskine Tate through the 1920s and with such jazz notables as Louis Armstrong and Johnny Dodds and impressed the young Earl Hines.

Weatherford then traveled, first to Amsterdam, then around Asia playing professionally. In the early 1930s, he led a band at the Taj Mahal Hotel in Bombay (now Mumbai), India. He joined Crickett Smith's band in Jakarta, Indonesia. Weatherford took over leadership of Smith's band in Ceylon (now Sri Lanka) in 1937.

During World War II, he led a band in Calcutta, where he made radio broadcasts for the U. S. Armed Forces Radio Service. Performers with Weatherford's band included Bridget Althea Moe, Jimmy Witherspoon, Roy Butler, Gery Scott and Cedric West.

Teddy Weatherford died of cholera in Calcutta, aged 41.
