= Proto-Bopper =

Studio album by Joe Albany
- Released: 1972
- Recorded: February 14 & 29 and October 7, 1972
- Studio: The Church of Truth, Pasadena, CA and Herrick Lounge, Occidental College, Los Angeles, CA
- Genre: Jazz
- Length: 42:14
- Label: Revelation; REV-16
- Producer: John William Hardy, Jon Horwich

Joe Albany chronology
Joe Albany at Home (1971)	Proto-Bopper (1972)	Birdtown Birds (1973)

Proto-Bopper is an album by pianist Joe Albany recorded in 1972 and released on the Revelation label in the US and on Spotlite in the UK.

== Reception ==
Professional ratings
Review scores
Source	Rating
Allmusic	4/5 stars

Allmusic's Scott Yanow said: "Despite an out-of-tune piano on a few of the songs, this is a worthy and historical set".

== Track listing ==
1. "When Lights Are Low" (Benny Carter) – 5:00
2. "Our Love Affair Is Over" (Joe Albany, Bob Whitlock) – 5:00
3. "You Don't Know What Love Is" (Gene de Paul, Don Raye) – 3:30
4. "For Heaven's Sake" (Elise Bretton, Sherman Edwards, Donald Meyer) – 2:30
5. "Gettin' Sentimental Over You" (George Bassman, Ned Washington) – 5:10
6. "Yardbird Suite" (Charlie Parker) – 3:56
7. "Imagination" (Jimmy Van Heusen, Johnny Burke) – 3:30
8. "Like Someone in Love" (Van Heusen, Burke) – 2:50
9. "C.C. Rider" (Traditional) – 4:33
10. "You're Blasé" (Ord Hamilton, Bruce Sievier) – 3:15
11. "Suddenly, It's Spring" (Victor Young) – 3:00

== Personnel ==
- Joe Albany – piano
- Bob Whitlock – bass (tracks 1, 2, 5, 6, 9 & 10)
- Nick Martinis (track 10), Jerry McKenzie (tracks 1, 2, 5, 6 & 9) – drums
