= Ballad for You =

Studio album by Warne Marsh
- Released: 1993
- Recorded: June 17 and December 24, 1985
- Studios: Music Box Recording Studio, NYC
- Genre: Jazz
- Labels: Interplay (IPCD-8609)
- Producer: Toshiya Taenaka

Warne Marsh chronology
Posthumous (1985)	Ballad for You (1993)	Warne Marsh & Susan Chen (1986)

Ballad for You, is an album by saxophonist Warne Marsh and pianist Susan Chen recorded in 1985 and released on the Interplay label.

== Track listing ==
All compositions by Warne Marsh except where noted.

1. "I Wish I Knew" (Harry Warren, Mack Gordon)
2. "Alone Together at Last"
3. "It Happened"
4. "Georgia on My Mind" (Hoagy Carmichael, Stuart Gorrell)
5. "Half-Forgotten Love Song"
6. "Ballad for Two"
7. "All Gone"
8. "You Don't Know What Love Is" (Gene de Paul, Don Raye)
9. "I Don't Care"
10. "Skylark" (Carmichael, Johnny Mercer)
11. "Mean to Me" (Fred E. Ahlert, Roy Turk))
- Recorded at Music Box Recording Studio, NYC on June 17, 1985 (track 10) and December 24, 1985 (tracks 1–9 & 11)

== Personnel ==
- Warne Marsh – tenor saxophone
- Susan Chen – piano
