= Sal Mosca =

American jazz musician

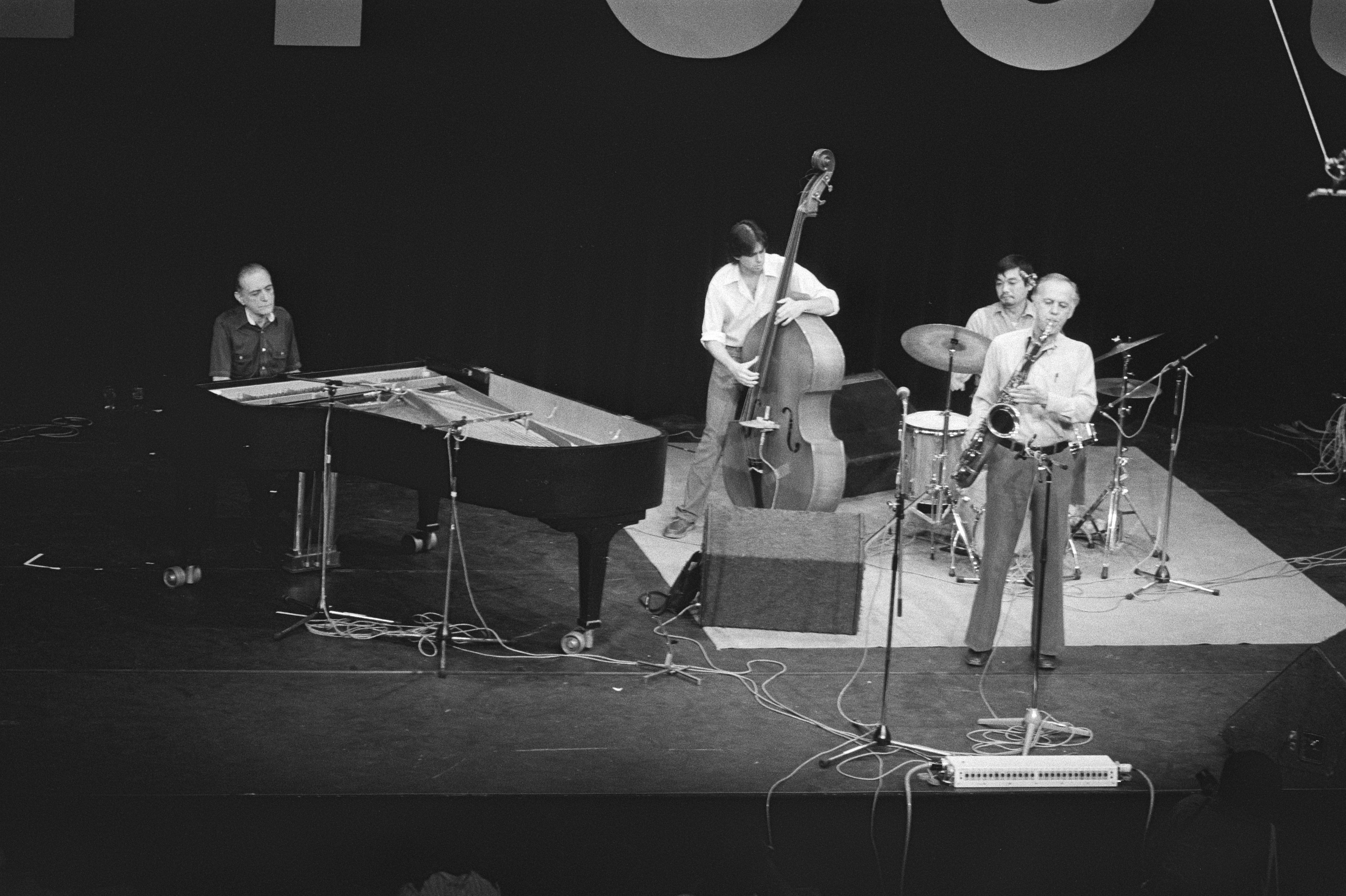
Sal Mosca (left) in 1983

Salvatore Joseph Mosca (April 27, 1927 – July 28, 2007) was an American jazz pianist who was a student of Lennie Tristano.

Mosca was born in Mount Vernon, New York, United States, to Italian American parents. He worked in cool jazz and post-bop. After playing in the United States Army Band during World War II, he studied at the New York College of Music using funds provided by the G.I. Bill. He began working with Lee Konitz in 1949, and also worked with Warne Marsh. He spent much of his career teaching and was relatively inactive after 1992, but new CDs were released in 2004, 2005, and 2008.

He died from emphysema in White Plains, New York, at the age of 80.

== Discography ==
=== As leader/co-leader ===
Year recorded	Year released	Title	Label	Notes
1955–59	1969?	Sal Mosca on Piano	Wave	Most tracks solo piano; some tracks duo, with Peter Ind (bass)
1959	1969?	At The Den	Wave	Duo, co-led with Peter Ind (bass); in concert
1970–97	2022	For Lennie Tristano	Fresh Sound	Solo piano
1977		Music	Interplay	Solo piano
1976–79	1980	How Deep, How High	Interplay	Most tracks duo, with Warne Marsh (tenor sax); some tracks quartet in concert, with Sam Jones (bass), Roy Haynes (drums) added
1979		For You	Choice	Solo piano
1979		A Concert	Jazz	Solo piano; in concert
1981	2015	Too Marvelous for Words	Cadence Jazz	Solo piano; in concert
1981		Sal Mosca/Warne Marsh Quartet Volume 1	Zinnia	Quartet, with Warne Marsh (tenor sax), Frank Canino (bass), Skip Scott (drums); in concert
1981		Sal Mosca/Warne Marsh Quartet Volume 2	Zinnia	One track solo piano; one track duo, with Warne Marsh (tenor sax); most tracks quartet, with Frank Canino (bass), Skip Scott (drums) added; in concert
1991	2004?	Recital in Valhalla	Zinnia	Solo piano; in concert
1992		Trickle	Zinnia	Solo piano; in concert
1992	2015	The Talk of the Town	Sunnyside	Solo piano; in concert
2004	2008	You Go to My Head	Blue Jack Jazz	Quartet, with Jimmy Halperin (tenor sax), Don Messina (bass), Bill Chattin (drums)
2004	2005	Thing-Ah-Majig	Zinnia	Trio, with Don Messina (bass), Bill Chattin (drums)

=== As sideman ===
With Lee Konitz

- Subconscious-Lee (Prestige, 1950)
- The New Sounds (Prestige, 1951) with Miles Davis
- Lee Konitz with Warne Marsh (Atlantic LP 1217, 1956)
- Inside Hi-Fi (Atlantic, 1956)
- Very Cool (Verve, 1957)
- Spirits (Milestone, 1971)
