= Tranquility (Lee Konitz album) =

Studio album by The Lee Konitz Quartet
- Released: 1957
- Recorded: October 22, 1957; New York City
- Genre: Jazz
- Length: 34:05
- Label: Verve; MGV 8281

Lee Konitz chronology
| Very Cool (1957) | Tranquility (1957) | An Image: Lee Konitz with Strings (1958) |

Tranquility is an album by American jazz saxophonist Lee Konitz's Quartet recorded in 1957 and released on the Verve label.

== Critical reception ==
Professional ratings
Review scores
| Source | Rating |
|---|---|
| Allmusic | 4.5/5 stars |
| Tom Hull | B+ |

Jason Ankeny of Allmusic states "crafted with startling precision and economy, Tranquility extols the virtues of mood and shape with Talmudic zeal, towering astride thought and expression. ...Rarely is music so profoundly cerebral also so deeply heartfelt".

== Track listing ==
1. "Stephanie" (Lee Konitz) – 3:57
2. "Memories of You" (Eubie Blake, Andy Razaf) – 3:12
3. "People Will Say We're in Love" (Richard Rodgers, Oscar Hammerstein II) – 4:57
4. "When You're Smiling" (Mark Fisher, Joe Goodwin, Larry Shay) – 3:48
5. "Sunday" (Chester Conn, Benny Krueger, Ned Miller, Jule Styne) – 3:26
6. "Lennie Bird" (Lennie Tristano) – 5:25
7. "The Nearness of You" (Hoagy Carmichael, Ned Washington) – 6:09
8. "Jonquil" (Werner Bauer) – 3:09

== Personnel ==
- Lee Konitz – alto saxophone
- Billy Bauer – guitar
- Henry Grimes – bass
- Dave Bailey – drums
