= Music for Prancing =

Studio album by Warne Marsh Quartet
- Released: 1957
- Recorded: September 19, 1957
- Studio: Radio Recorders, Los Angeles, CA
- Genre: Jazz
- Length: 30:47
- Label: Mode; MOD-LP 125
- Producer: Red Clyde

Warne Marsh chronology
The Right Combination (1957)	Music for Prancing (1957)	Warne Mash (1958)

Music for Prancing is an album by saxophonist Warne Marsh, recorded in 1957 and originally released on the Mode label.

== Reception ==
Professional ratings
Review scores
Source	Rating
AllMusic	3/5 stars
The Penguin Guide to Jazz Recordings	3/4 stars

The AllMusic review noted, "With a reputation as one of the originators of cool jazz, it's ironic that over the years tenor saxophonist Warne Marsh gained a following of musicians mainly associated with the avant-garde, spearheaded by multi-reedist Anthony Braxton. These musicians heard what this disc demonstrates: that cool didn't always mean smoothed out".

== Track listing ==
1. "You Are Too Beautiful" (Richard Rodgers, Lorenz Hart) – 5:30
2. "Autumn in New York" (Vernon Duke) – 4:58
3. "Playa del Ray" (Warne Marsh) – 4:59
4. "Ad Libido" (Ronnie Ball) – 4:24
5. "Everything Happens to Me" (Matt Dennis, Tom Adair) – 6:41
6. "It's All Right with Me" (Cole Porter) – 4:15

== Personnel ==
- Warne Marsh – tenor saxophone
- Ronnie Ball – piano
- Red Mitchell – bass
- Stan Levey – drums
