= A Ballad Album =

Studio album by Warne Marsh Quartet featuring Lou Levy
- Released: 1984
- Recorded: April 7, 1983
- Studio: Studio 44, Monster, Holland
- Genre: Jazz
- Length: 65:04
- Label: Criss Cross Jazz; 1007
- Producer: Gerry Teekens

Warne Marsh chronology
Warne Marsh Meets Gary Foster (1982)	A Ballad Album (1984)	Posthumous (1985)

A Ballad Album, is an album by saxophonist Warne Marsh, recorded in 1983 and released on the Dutch Criss Cross Jazz label.

== Reception ==
Professional ratings
Review scores
Source	Rating
AllMusic	4.5/5 stars
The Penguin Guide to Jazz	3/4 stars

The AllMusic review states:

Although there is a certain amount of tempo variation, this is largely a ballad showcase CD for tenor saxophonist Warne Marsh... Fine music that is both relaxing and (thanks to Marsh) somewhat unsettling under the surface.

— Yanow, Scott. A Ballad Album – Review at AllMusic. Retrieved May 16, 2017.

== Track listing ==
1. "I Can't Give You Anything but Love, Baby" (Jimmy McHugh, Dorothy Fields) – 5:42
2. "The Nearness of You" (Hoagy Carmichael, Ned Washington) – 7:57
3. "How Deep Is the Ocean?" (Irving Berlin) – 5:49
4. "Spring Is Here" (Richard Rodgers, Lorenz Hart) – 5:10
5. "How High the Moon" (Morgan Lewis, Nancy Hamilton) – 7:16
6. "Time on My Hands" (Vincent Youmans, Harold Adamson, Mack Gordon) – 4:36
7. "Emily" (Johnny Mandel, Johnny Mercer) – 5:03
8. "My Romance" (Rogers, Hart) – 5:40
9. "How Deep Is the Ocean?" [take 3] (Berlin) – 5:39 Bonus track on CD reissue
10. "Time on My Hands" [take 1] (Youmans, Adamson, Gordon) – 5:11 Bonus track on CD reissue
11. "The Nearness of You" [take 1] (Carmichael, Washington) – 7:30 Bonus track on CD reissue

== Personnel ==
- Warne Marsh – tenor saxophone
- Lou Levy – piano
- Jesper Lundgaard – bass
- James Martin – drums
