= How Deep, How High =

Studio album / Live album by Warne Marsh and Sal Mosca
- Released: 1980
- Recorded: April 25, 1976, May 2, 1979, and August 8, 1979
- Venue: Sarah Lawrence College, NY
- Studio: Sal Mosca Studio, Mt. Vernon, NY
- Genre: Jazz
- Length: 31:41
- Label: Interplay; IP-7725
- Producer: Toshiya Taenaka

Warne Marsh chronology
Conversations with Warne Volume 2 (1978)	How Deep, How High (1980)	I Remember You... (1980)

How Deep, How High, is an album by saxophonist Warne Marsh and pianist Sal Mosca, recorded in concert in 1976 and studio in 1979 and released on the Interplay label.

== Reception ==
Professional ratings
Review scores
Source	Rating
AllMusic	4/5 stars
The Rolling Stone Jazz Record Guide	4/5 stars

The Rolling Stone Jazz Record Guide commented: "How Deep, How High reunites Marsh with another Tristano student, pianist Sal Mosca, for a re-examination of academic roots. The dedication to a fluid, melodic concept remains intact, but gone is the strict adherence to a lightly colored tone". The AllMusic review states: "The music ranges from introspective to more driving, but it swings throughout, and Marsh's solos are always intriguing".

== Track listing ==
All compositions by Warne Marsh except where noted

1. "The Hard Way" (Sal Mosca) – 4:03
2. "Noteworthy" – 4:21
3. "Finishing Touch" (Mosca) – 3:41
4. "How Deep, How High" – 4:30
5. "Background Music" – 7:01
6. "She's Funny That Way" (Neil Moret, Richard A. Whiting) – 8:05
- Recorded at Sarah Lawrence College, Bronxville, NY, on April 25, 1976 (tracks 5 & 6) and at Sal Mosca's Studio in Mount Vernon, NY, on May 2, 1979 (tracks 1 & 2) and August 8, 1979 (tracks 3 & 4)

== Personnel ==
- Warne Marsh – tenor saxophone
- Sal Mosca – piano
- Sam Jones – bass (tracks 5 & 6)
- Roy Haynes – drums (tracks 5 & 6)
