= Posthumous (album) =

Studio album by Warne Marsh
- Released: 1987
- Recorded: March 12, 1985
- Studio: Vanguard, NYC
- Genre: Jazz
- Length: 57:08 CD reissue with bonus track
- Label: Interplay; IP-8604
- Producer: Toshiya Taenaka

Warne Marsh chronology
A Ballad Album (1983)	Posthumous (1987)	Ballad for You (1986)

Newly Warne cover

Posthumous is an album by saxophonist Warne Marsh, recorded in 1985 but not and released on the Interplay label until 1987. The album was rereleased on the Dutch Storyville label as Newly Warne in 1989 with slightly different track titles and an additional recording from the same session.

== Reception ==
Professional ratings
Review scores
Source	Rating
AllMusic	3/5 stars
The Penguin Guide to Jazz	3/4 stars

AllMusic states, "Strong mid-'80s material by tenor saxophonist Warne Marsh that for some reason was not issued until he died in 1987. It featured Marsh in a much looser, fiery style than usual, without the exacting, complex lines and lengthy constructions he usually employed".

== Track listing ==
All compositions by Warne Marsh except where noted.

1. "Unheard of" a.k.a. "Unheard" – 5:35
2. "Things Called Love" a.k.a. "What Is This?" – 5:40
3. "Inside Out" – 7:21
4. "Parisienne Thoroughfare" (Bud Powell) – 4:30
5. "Emperor's Old Cloth" a.k.a. "Emperor's Old Clothes" (Susan Chen) – 6:05
6. "At First Blush" – 6:32
7. "Beautiful Love Fades Out" – 5:10
8. "Turn Out the Night" – 2:42
9. "On a Slow Boat to China" (Frank Loesser) – 4:07 Bonus track on Newly Warne

== Personnel ==
- Warne Marsh – tenor saxophone
- Susan Chen – piano
- George Mraz – bass
- Akira Tana – drums
