= Live at the Montmartre Club: Jazz Exchange Vol. 2 =

Live at the Montmartre Club: Jazz Exchange, Vol. 2

Live album by Warne Marsh Lee Konitz Quintet
- Released: 1977
- Recorded: December 27, 1975
- Venue: Jazzhus Montmartre, Copenhagen, Denmark
- Genre: Jazz
- Length: 57:22 CD reissue with bonus tracks
- Label: Storyville; SLP 1020
- Producer: Arnvid Meyer

Warne Marsh chronology
Warne Marsh Quintet: Jazz Exchange Vol. 1 (1975)	Live at the Montmartre Club: Jazz Exchange, Vol. 2 (1977)	Warne Marsh Lee Konitz: Jazz Exchange Vol. 3 (1975)

Lee Konitz chronology
Warne Marsh Quintet: Jazz Exchange Vol. 1 (1975)	Live at the Montmartre Club: Jazz Exchange, Vol. 2 (1975)	Warne Marsh Lee Konitz: Jazz Exchange Vol. 3 (1975)

Warne Marsh Quintet: Jazz Exchange Vol. 2, is a live album by saxophonists Warne Marsh and Lee Konitz which was recorded at the Jazzhus Montmartre in late 1975 and released on the Dutch Storyville label.

== Reception ==
Professional ratings
Review scores
Source	Rating
Allmusic	4/5 stars

The Allmusic review stated "In December 1975, tenor saxophonist Warne Marsh and altoist Lee Konitz went on a European tour. Their musical reunion showed that the magic that had existed between them a quarter-century before when they teamed up with their teacher Lennie Tristano was still very much present. Both saxophonists had grown through the years, and on this second of three sets, they are in consistently inventive form".

== Track listing ==
1. "Kary's Trance" (Lee Konitz) – 6:08
2. "Foolin' Myself" (Jack Lawrence, Peter Tinturin) – 5:52
3. "Sound-Lee" (Konitz) – 8:09
4. "Two-Part Invention No. 1 Allegro" (Johann Sebastian Bach) – 1:10
5. "Two Not One" (Lennie Tristano) – 7:05
6. "Darn That Dream" (Jimmy Van Heusen, Eddie DeLange) – 5:03
7. "317 East 32nd Street" (Tristano) – 8:17
8. "Two-Part Invention No. 13 Allegro Tranquillo" (Bach) – 1:19
9. "April" (Tristano) – 9:13 Bonus track on CD reissue
10. "Everything Happens to Me" (Matt Dennis, Tom Adair) – 5:06 Bonus track on CD reissue

== Personnel ==
- Warne Marsh – tenor saxophone
- Lee Konitz – alto saxophone
- Dave Cliff – guitar
- Peter Ind – bass
- Al Levitt – drums
