= Lee Konitz Plays =

Studio album by Lee Konitz
- Released: 1953
- Recorded: September 17, 1953
- Studio: Studio Jouvenet, Paris, France
- Genre: Jazz
- Label: Disques Vogue; LD. 169

Lee Konitz chronology
Lee Konitz Plays with the Gerry Mulligan Quartet (1953)	Lee Konitz Plays (1953)	Lee Konitz at Storyville (1954)

Lee Konitz Plays (a.k.a. Jazz Time Paris: Vol. VII) is an album by saxophonist and bandleader Lee Konitz featuring performances recorded in Paris in 1953 which were originally released as a 10 inch LP on the French Disques Vogue label.

== Reception ==
Professional ratings
Review scores
Source	Rating
Allmusic	3/5 stars

The Allmusic review by Scott Yanow stated "The cool-toned altoist is in fine form for his set".

== Track listing ==
All compositions by Lee Konitz except where noted

1. "I'll Remember April" (Gene de Paul, Patricia Johnston, Don Raye) – 4:12
2. "Record Shop Suey" – 3:14
3. "Le Tchee" – 2:34
4. "Young Lee" – 3:18
5. "You'd Be So Nice to Come Home To" (Cole Porter) – 2:35
6. "4PM" – 2:40
7. "Lost Henri" – 3:22

== Personnel ==
- Lee Konitz – alto saxophone
- Henri Renaud – piano
- Jimmy Gourley – guitar
- Don Bagley – bass
- Stan Levey – drums
