= Al Levitt =

American jazz musician

- Born: November 11, 1932; New York City, New York, US
- Died: November 28, 1994 (aged 62) France
- Genres: Jazz
- Occupation: Musician
- Instruments: Drums, piano
- Labels: ESP Disk; Maracatu
- Spouse: Stella Levitt

Alan Levitt (November 11, 1932 – November 28, 1994) was an American jazz drummer.

== Career ==
Levitt was born in New York City to Ben Levitt (1908–1941) and Florence Cohen Levitt (1912–1950). Early in life he showed an interest in music. In the early 1940s he went to an inter-racial summer camp, Camp Wo-Ch-Ca, where he met Mike Stoller. They became close friends and both became interested in boogie-woogie and jazz. In 1947 when they were 14 years old they visited a social club in Harlem. For the next two years they spent weekend evenings listening to Charlie Parker, Miles Davis, Oscar Pettiford, and Erroll Garner. In 1949 Mike Stoller moved to Los Angeles. Levitt went on to be a jazz drummer. Stoller met another young man in Los Angeles and they wrote songs together. They were known as Leiber & Stoller.

Levitt studied with Lennie Tristano for many years, along with Lee Konitz. Levitt also studied occasionally with Max Roach. Levitt studied piano with Moses Chusids in high school. He studied under Lennie Tristano along with Lee Konitz and studied drums under Irv Kluger in 1949–50. In the early 70s he picked up studies again with Max Roach.

After moving to the Canary Islands, Spain, in 1973 with Stella, his common law wife, and her five children, Levitt played with Canadian bass player Lloyd Thompson, Dutch pianist Nico Bunink, and American trumpeter Don Jeter. Moving then to Madrid, Levitt played with Spanish saxophonist Pedro Iturralde.

Moving to France in 1975, Levitt again met and played with friends from the U.S. In Paris he founded a band with Alain Jean-Marie. His group consisted of Stella on vocals, Sean on guitar, Alain Jean Marie on piano and Gus Nemeth on bass. He played with Paul Bley, Lee Konitz, Warne Marsh, Jimmy Raney, Dexter Gordon, Harry "Sweets" Edison, Eddie "Lockjaw" Davis, J. J. Johnson, Stan Getz, Chet Baker, Jimmy Gourley, Peter Ind, Martial Solal, René Urtreger, Pierre Michelot, Michel Petrucciani, Clark Terry, Dorothy Donegan, Guy Lafitte and Barney Wilen. Levitt died Nov. 28, 1994 in France, age 62.

== Discography ==
=== As leader ===
- We Are the Levitts (ESP Disk, 1968)
- Dearly Beloved with Stella Levitt (Maracatu, 1989)

=== As sideman ===
With Lee Konitz

- In Harvard Square (Storyville, 1955)
- Jazz at Storyville (Storyville, 1956)
- Lee Konitz Meets Warne Marsh Again (Epic, 1977)
- Live at the Montmartre Club: Jazz Exchange Vol. 2(Storyville, 1977)

With others

- Sidney Bechet, Sidney Bechet Martial Solal (Swing, 1957)
- Paul Bley, Paul Bley (Wing, 1954)
- Nathan Davis, London by Night (Hot House, 1987)
- Bob Dorough, Devil May Care (52e Rue Est, 1983)
- Bob Dorough, Songs of Love (Orange Blue, 1988)
- Teddy Edwards, Sunset Eyes (Pacific Jazz, 1960)
- Stan Getz, and the Cool Sounds (Verve, 1957)
- Dusko Goykovich, Celebration (DIW, 1987)
- Stephane Grappelli, Stephane Grappelly et Son Quartette (Barclay, 1957)
- Warne Marsh, The Unissued 1975 Copenhagen Studio Recordings (Storyville, 1997)
- Warne Marsh, The Unissued Copenhagen Studio Recordings (Storyville, 1997)
- Jimmy Raney, Chuck Wayne, Joe Puma, Dick Garcia, The Fourmost Guitars (ABC-Paramount, 1957)
- Bobby Scott, Scott Free (ABC-Paramount, 1955)
- Lennie Tristano, Marian McPartland, Bobby Scott, Joe Bushkin, The Jazz Keyboards (Savoy, 1955)
- Rene Urtreger, Rene Urtreger Trio (Versailles, 1957)
- Guy Lafitte, The things we did last summer (Black & Blue, 1990))
- Barney Wilen, Tilt (Swing, 1957)
- Barney Wilen, Barney Wilen Quintet (Fresh Sound, 1989)
- Joe Lee Wilson, Secrets from the Sun (Inner City, 1977)
