= Two's Company (Joe Albany and Niels-Henning Ørsted Pedersen album) =

Studio album by Joe Albany and Niels-Henning Ørsted Pedersen
- Released: 1974
- Recorded: February 17, 1974
- Studio: Rosenberg Studie, Copenhagen, Denmark
- Genre: Jazz
- Length: 43:10
- Label: SteepleChase; SCS-1019
- Producer: Nils Winther

Joe Albany chronology
Birdtown Birds (1973)	Two's Company (1974)	Joe Albany & Joe Venuti (1974)

Niels-Henning Ørsted Pedersen chronology
Duo 2 (1974)	Two's Company (1974)	Duo Live in Concert (1974)

Professional ratings
Review scores
Source	Rating
Allmusic	4/5 stars
The Penguin Guide to Jazz	2.5/4 stars
The Rolling Stone Jazz Record Guide	3/5 stars

Two's Company is an album by pianist Joe Albany and bassist Niels-Henning Ørsted Pedersen recorded in 1974 and released on the SteepleChase label.

== Reception ==
The Allmusic review awarded the album 4 stars stating "This duet set with bassist Niels-Henning Orsted Pedersen finds Albany in particularly good form on six veteran standards ...His lyrical and boppish style was still very much intact and Albany is heard in prime form on the thoughtful yet swinging set". The Penguin Guide to Jazz expressed a preference for this album over Birdtown Birds, but wrote that "Albany often sounds less radical than merely clumsy and the solo passages are rife with misfingerings".

== Track listing ==
1. "Out of Nowhere" (Johnny Green, Edward Heyman) - 5:29
2. "What's New?" (Bob Haggart, Jonny Burke) - 9:06
3. "Lullaby in Rhythm" (Clarence Profit, Edgar Sampson) - 4:47
4. "Lover Man" (Jimmy Davis, Ram Ramirez, James Sherman) - 6:49
5. "If You Could See Me Now" (Tadd Dameron, Carl Sigman) - 7:08
6. "Star Eyes" (Gene de Paul, Don Raye) - 5:45

== Personnel ==
- Joe Albany - piano
- Niels-Henning Ørsted Pedersen - bass
