= Jazz of Two Cities =

Studio album by Warne Marsh
- Released: 1957
- Recorded: October 3 & 11, 1956
- Studio: Radio Recorders, Los Angeles, CA
- Genre: Jazz
- Label: Imperial; LP 9027

Warne Marsh chronology
| Lee Konitz with Warne Marsh (1955) | Jazz of Two Cities (1957) | Art Pepper with Warne Marsh (1956) |

The Winds of Marsh cover

Jazz of Two Cities, is an album by saxophonist Warne Marsh, recorded in 1956 and released on the Imperial label. The album was later released in stereo as The Winds of Marsh which featured different takes of four of the numbers.

== Reception ==
Professional ratings
Review scores
| Source | Rating |
|---|---|
| AllMusic | 4.5/5 stars |
| The Penguin Guide to Jazz Recordings | 3/4 stars |

The AllMusic review noted, "This is some very fine music by a band with an exceptionally rich collective imagination. It is clear that, in the hands of this combo, every theme is treated like a question with an absolutely limitless amount of harmonic and melodic answers".

== Track listing ==
1. "Smog Eyes" (Ted Brown) – 3:30
2. "Ear Conditioning" (Ronnie Ball) – 5:13
3. "Lover Man" (Jimmy Davis, Ram Ramirez, James Sherman) – 4:27
4. "Quintessence" (Ball) – 2:13
5. "Jazz of Two Cities" (Brown) – 4:38
6. "Dixie's Dilemma" (Warne Marsh) – 4:20
7. "Tschaikovsky's Opus #42, Mt. 3" (Pyotr Ilyich Tchaikovsky) – 3:59
8. "I Never Knew" (Ted Fio Rito, Gus Kahn) – 5:10

== Personnel ==
- Warne Marsh, Ted Brown – tenor saxophone
- Ronnie Ball – piano
- Ben Tucker – bass
- Jeff Morton – drums
