= The Real Lee Konitz =

Live album by Lee Konitz
- Released: 1957
- Recorded: February 15, 1957
- Studio: The Midway Lounge in Pittsburgh, PA
- Genre: Jazz
- Length: 36:19
- Label: Atlantic; LP 1273

Lee Konitz chronology
Worth While (1956)	The Real Lee Konitz (1957)	Very Cool (1957)

The Real Lee Konitz is a live album by American jazz saxophonist Lee Konitz which was released on the Atlantic record label in 1957.

== Critical reception ==
Professional ratings
Review scores
Source	Rating
Allmusic	4/5 stars

Jim Todd of Allmusic states "The result of this low-tech production is a fine document of Konitz playing live in a fairly straight-ahead setting. The sound is good and places the leader's alto sax at the forefront, as he floats his sinewy, pleasantly acerbic sound over the attentive work of the rhythm section".

== Track listing ==
1. "Straightaway" (Lee Konitz) - 3:41
2. "Foolin' Myself" (Andy Razaf, Fats Waller) - 4:40
3. "You Go to My Head" (J. Fred Coots, Haven Gillespie) - 6:10
4. "My Melancholy Baby" (Ernie Burnett, George A. Norton) - 3:56
5. "Pennies in Minor" (Lennie Tristano) - 8:42
6. "Sweet and Lovely" (Gus Arnheim, Jules LeMare, Harry Tobias) - 2:15
7. "Easy Livin'" (Ralph Rainger, Leo Robin) - 3:35
8. "Midway" (Konitz) - 3:20

== Personnel ==
- Lee Konitz - alto saxophone
- Don Ferrara - trumpet (tracks 5 & 6)
- Billy Bauer - guitar
- Peter Ind - bass
- Dick Scott - drums
