= Live in Hollywood (Warne Marsh album) =

Live album by Warne Marsh
- Released: 1979
- Recorded: December 23, 1952
- Venue: The Haig, Hollywood, CA
- Genre: Jazz
- Label: Xanadu; 151
- Producer: Bob Andrews, Don Schlitten

Warne Marsh chronology
Live in Hollywood (1979)	Lee Konitz with Warne Marsh (1955)

Live in Hollywood, is a live album by saxophonist Warne Marsh, recorded in 1952 and released on the Xanadu label in 1979.

== Reception ==
Professional ratings
Review scores
Source	Rating
AllMusic	4/5 stars
The Penguin Guide to Jazz	3.5/4 stars

The Penguin Guide to Jazz states, "If the Live in Hollywood sessions belie Marsh's reputation as a cool, even cold, player, that is largely Hawes's doing. He consistently pushes the pace ". The AllMusic review noted: "This privately recorded club appearance (from the Haig in Los Angeles) features the vastly underrated tenor-saxophonist Warne Marsh in excellent form... Since Warne Marsh was sparsely recorded during this era, this is a valuable document of his playing".

== Track listing ==
1. "Fine and Dandy" (Kay Swift, Paul James) – 7:12
2. "You Go to My Head" (J. Fred Coots, Haven Gillespie) – 8:50
3. "I Can't Believe That You're in Love with Me" (Jimmy McHugh, Clarence Gaskill) – 9:45
4. "Buzzy" (Charlie Parker) – 7:15
5. "All the Things You Are" (Jerome Kern, Oscar Hammerstein II) – 5:19
6. "I'll Remember April" (Gene de Paul, Patricia Johnston, Don Raye) – 7:09
7. "I Got Rhythm" (George Gershwin, Ira Gershwin) – 6:19

== Personnel ==
- Warne Marsh – tenor saxophone
- Hampton Hawes – piano
- Joe Mondragon – bass
- Shelly Manne – drums
