= Joe Albany at Home =

Studio album by Joe Albany
- Released: 1971
- Recorded: August 31 and September 5, 1971
- Studio: 1822 N Wilton Place, Hollywood CA
- Genre: Jazz
- Length: 43:47
- Label: Spotlite; JA1
- Producer: Tony Williams

Joe Albany chronology
Portrait of a Legend (1966)	Joe Albany at Home (1971)	Proto-Bopper (1972)

At Home Alone Cover

Joe Albany at Home is a solo album by the pianist Joe Albany, recorded in 1971 and released on the Spotlite label in the UK and on the Revelation label in the US as At Home Alone in 1976.

== Reception ==
Professional ratings
Review scores
Source	Rating
Allmusic	4/5 stars
DownBeat	4/5 stars

Allmusic's Scott Yanow wrote, "This release was quite important for a couple of reasons. It was the first LP put out by the British Spotlite label and only the second date led by the legendary (and until then largely forgotten) bop pianist Joe Albany ... The recording quality is decent if not state-of-the-art, but the playing is quite excellent and fortunately led to the rediscovery of this important "missing link"".

DownBeat assigned the album 4 stars. Reviewer Jerry De Muth wrote, "Despite Albany’s bop roots there are no feverish “Powellisms” on these very relaxed sides. Albany plays with some debt to the rich harmonies, stride touches and brilliant runs of Tatum on the old standards which comprise most of the LP, while he sounds more like a bop Teddy Wilson, with hints of Thelonious Monk, on the two Parker tunes. But there’s nothing imitative in his playing".

== Track listing ==
1. "What's New?" (Bob Haggart, Johnny Burke) – 4:37
2. "You're Blasé" (Ord Hamilton, Bruce Sievier) – 3:52
3. "Why Was I Born?" (Jerome Kern, Oscar Hammerstein II) – 4:10
4. "Jitterbug Waltz" (Fats Waller) – 4:08
5. "Night and Day" (Cole Porter) – 4:12
6. "What Are You Doing the Rest of Your Life?" (Michel Legrand, Alan Bergman, Marilyn Bergman) – 4:05
7. "Barbados" (Charlie Parker) – 2:19
8. "Can't We Be Friends?" (Kay Swift, Paul James) – 3:41
9. "Everything Happens to Me" (Matt Dennis, Tom Adair) – 3:40
10. "You've Changed" (Bill Carey, Carl Fischer) – 3:43
11. "Birdtown Birds" (Joe Albany) – 2:01
12. "Isn't It Romantic?" (Richard Rodgers, Lorenz Hart) – 3:19

== Personnel ==
- Joe Albany – piano
