= Ronnie Ball =

- Born: Ronald Ball; 22 December 1927; Birmingham, England
- Died: October 1984 (aged 56) New York, U.S.
- Genres: Jazz
- Occupations: Musician, composer
- Instrument: Piano
- Years active: 1950–1984

Ronald Ball (22 December 1927 – October 1984) was an English jazz pianist, composer and arranger.

== Early life ==
Born in Birmingham, Ball moved to London in 1948.

== Career ==
In the early 1950s Ball worked both as a bandleader and under Ronnie Scott, Tony Kinsey, Victor Feldman, and Harry Klein. In 1952, he moved to New York City and studied with Lennie Tristano. At the time, it was his ambition to learn more about the American jazz scene and in the 1950s and 1960s he worked extensively with other jazz musicians. Among the musicians Ball performed with are Chuck Wayne (1952), Dizzy Gillespie, Lee Konitz (1953–55), Kenny Clarke, Hank Mobley, Art Pepper, J.J. Johnson (1956), Kai Winding (1956, 1958), Warne Marsh,(1956–57), Buddy Rich (1958), Gene Krupa (1958), Roy Eldridge (1959) and Chris Connor (1961–63).

Ball plays on the Warne Marsh album Jazz of Two Cities (recorded during October 1956 in Los Angeles) with Marsh and Ted Brown (tenor saxophone), Ben Tucker (bass), and Jeff Morton (drums). It was later reissued on Tristano/Marsh Capitol compilation Intuition (Capitol CDP 7243 8 52771 2 2). That same year, Ball recorded his first record as leader. The album, called All About Ronnie, was released on Savoy Records and featured Brown and Clarke, as well as Willie Dennis and Wendell Marshall.

During a two-year period (1961–1963), Ball occasionally accompanied American jazz singer Chris Connor and made recordings with her on many occasions. As most of his adult life was spent in New York, he only made a small number of recordings in London and very little recorded material was reissued on CD. Later in the 1960s, Ball worked as part of the house trio at the Studio 51 Club on Great Newport Street in London. He ended his musical career to work completing transcriptions for a music publisher until his death in 1984.

== Death ==
Ball died in New York City in October 1984, aged 56. His exact date of death is unknown.

== Discography ==
As leader

- All About Ronnie (Savoy, 1956)

With Kenny Clarke

- Klook's Clique (Savoy, 1956)

With Teddy Edwards

- Sunset Eyes (Pacific Jazz, 1960)

With Roy Eldridge

- Swingin' on the Town (Verve, 1960)

With Lee Konitz

- Lee Konitz at Storyville (Storyville, 1954)
- Konitz (Storyvile, 1954)
- Lee Konitz in Harvard Square (Storyvile, 1954)

With Warne Marsh

- Jazz of Two Cities (Imperial, 1956)
- Art Pepper with Warne Marsh (Contemporary, 1956 [1986]) with Art Pepper
- Music for Prancing (Mode, 1957)
- Warne Marsh (Atlantic, 1958)
