= Ike Isaacs (guitarist) =

Burmese-English jazz guitarist (1919–1996)

Ike Isaacs (December 1, 1919, Rangoon, Burma – January 11, 1996, Sydney, Australia) was a Burmese-English jazz guitarist, best known for his work with violinist Stéphane Grappelli.

Isaacs was self-taught on guitar. In Burma he grew up with fellow guitarist Cedric West. He started playing professionally in college while pursuing a degree in chemistry. In 1946 he moved to England, where he became a member of the BBC Show Band. During the 1960s and 1970s, he was a member of the Hot Club of London, led by guitarist Diz Disley, which often collaborated with Stéphane Grappelli. He was a member of the band Velvet with Digby Fairweather, Len Skeat, and Denny Wright. In the 1980s, he moved to Australia and taught at the Sydney School of Guitar.

He died of cancer in January 1996 at the age of 76.

== Discography ==
=== As sideman ===
With Stéphane Grappelli

- Violinspiration (1975)
- Compact Jazz: Jean-Luc Ponty & Stephane Grappelli (1990)
- Shades of Django (1990)
- Menuhin & Grappelli Play Gershwin, Berlin, Kern, Porter, Rodgers & Hart and Others (1990)

With others

- Ted Heath, Our Kind of Jazz (1958)
- Barney Kessel, Hair Is Beautiful (1968)
- Barry Gray, Thunderbirds 2 (2004)
- Jake Thackray, Jake in a Box: The EMI Recordings 1967–1976 (2006)
- Martin Taylor, Sketches: A Tribute to Art Tatum (2006)
- Stan Tracey, Three Classic Albums Plus: Showcase/Little Klunk/Jazz Inc. (2011)
