= Very Cool =

Studio album by Lee Konitz
- Released: 1957
- Recorded: May 12, 1957; New York City
- Genre: Jazz
- Labels: Verve; MGV 8209
- Producer: Norman Granz

Lee Konitz chronology
The Real Lee Konitz (1957)	Very Cool (1957)	Tranquility (1957)

Very Cool is an album by American jazz saxophonist Lee Konitz which was his first released on the Verve label in 1957.

Professional ratings
Review scores
Source	Rating
Allmusic	3/5 stars

== Track listing ==
1. "Sunflower" (Don Ferrara) - 8:06
2. "Stairway to the Stars" (Matty Malneck, Frank Signorelli, Mitchell Parish) - 5:24
3. "Movin' Around" (Ferrara) - 7:49
4. "Kary's Trance" (Lee Konitz) - 7:13
5. "Crazy She Calls Me" (Carl Sigman, Bob Russell) – 7:26
6. "Billie's Bounce" (Charlie Parker) - 6:13

== Personnel ==
- Lee Konitz - alto saxophone
- Don Ferrara - trumpet
- Sal Mosca - piano
- Peter Ind - bass
- Shadow Wilson - drums
