= Live at the Half Note (Lee Konitz album) =

Live album by Lee Konitz
- Released: 1994
- Recorded: February 24 and possibly March 3, 1959
- Venue: Half Note, New York City
- Genre: Jazz
- Length: 96:02
- Label: Verve Discoveries; 314 521 659-2
- Producer: Lee Konitz

Lee Konitz chronology
An Image: Lee Konitz with Strings (1958)	Live at the Half Note (1994)	Lee Konitz Meets Jimmy Giuffre (1959)

Live at the Half Note is a live album by American jazz saxophonists Lee Konitz and Warne Marsh recorded at the Half Note in 1959 accompanied by Bill Evans, Jimmy Garrison, and Paul Motian. It was first released on the Verve label in 1994 as a double CD set.

== Critical reception ==
Professional ratings
Review scores
Source	Rating
Allmusic	5/5 stars

Scott Yanow, writing for Allmusic, stated: "They perform a dozen extended standards (or "originals" based on the chord changes of familiar tunes) with creativity and inspiration. In fact, of all the Konitz-Marsh recordings, this set ranks near the top".

== Track listing ==
Disc one

1. "Palo Alto" (Lee Konitz) – 9:13
2. "How About You?" (Burton Lane, Ralph Freed) – 9:15
3. "My Melancholy Baby" (Ernie Burnett, George Norton) – 6:54
4. "Scrapple from the Apple" (Charlie Parker) – 7:53
5. "You Stepped Out of a Dream" (Nacio Herb Brown, Gus Kahn) – 7:39
6. "317 East 32nd Street" (Lennie Tristano) – 7:44

Disc two

1. "April" (Tristano) – 8:44
2. "It's You or No One" (Jule Styne, Sammy Cahn) – 8:09
3. "Just Friends" (John Klenner, Sam M. Lewis) – 5:40
4. "Baby, Baby All the Time" (Bobby Troup) – 8:31
5. "Lennie-Bird" (Tristano) – 8:39
6. "Subconscious Lee" (Konitz) – 7:41

== Personnel ==
- Lee Konitz – alto saxophone
- Warne Marsh – tenor saxophone
- Bill Evans – piano
- Jimmy Garrison – bass
- Paul Motian – drums
