= Storyville Records (George Wein's) =

- Founded: 1950
- Founder: George Wein
- Genre: Jazz
- Country of origin: U.S.
- Location: Boston

Storyville Records was a jazz record company and label founded by George Wein in Boston in the 1950s. It is not related to the Danish record label of the same name.

Examples of artists who recorded on the label included Sidney Bechet, Bob Brookmeyer, Jackie and Roy, Teddi King, Lee Konitz and Lee Wiley.
