= Warne Marsh =

American tenor saxophonist (1927–1987)

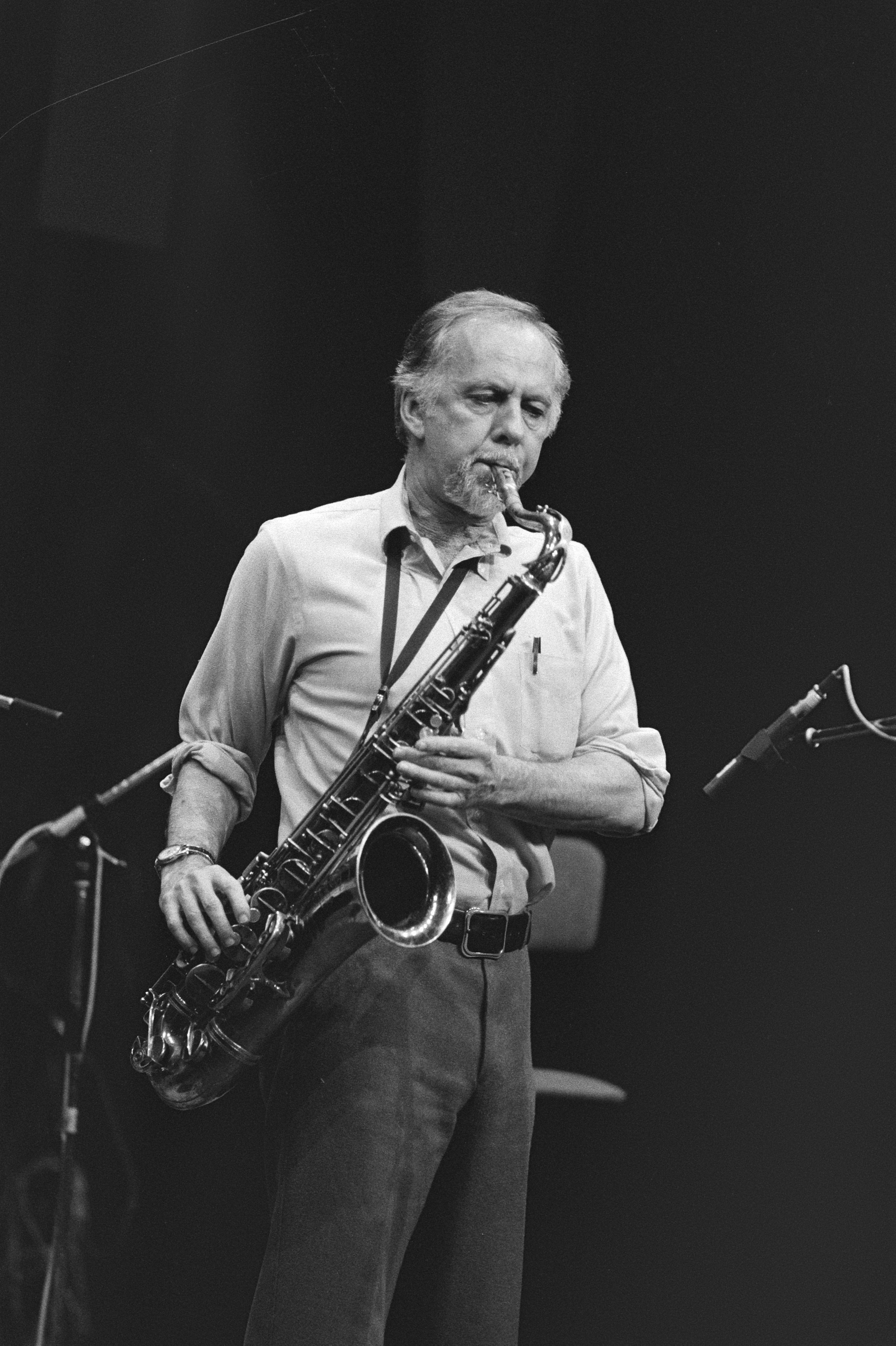
- Marsh in Amsterdam, 1982

Background information
- Born: Warne Marion Marsh; October 26, 1927; Los Angeles, California, U.S.
- Died: December 18, 1987 (aged 60) North Hollywood, Los Angeles, California, U.S.
- Genres: Jazz
- Occupation: Musician
- Instrument: Saxophone
- Years active: Early 1940s – 1987
- Formerly of: Lennie Tristano, Lee Konitz, Supersax

Warne Marion Marsh (October 26, 1927 – December 18, 1987) was an American tenor saxophonist. Born in Los Angeles, his playing first came to prominence in the 1950s as a protégé of pianist Lennie Tristano and earned attention in the 1970s as a member of Supersax.

== Biography ==
Marsh came from an affluent artistic background: his father was Hollywood cinematographer Oliver T. Marsh (1892–1941), and his mother Elizabeth was a violinist. He was the nephew of actresses Mae Marsh and Marguerite Marsh and film editor Frances Marsh.

He was tutored by Lennie Tristano. Marsh was often recorded in the company of other Cool School musicians, and remained one of the most faithful to the Tristano philosophy of improvisation – the faith in the purity of the long line, the avoidance of licks and emotional chain-pulling, the concentration on endlessly mining the same small body of jazz standards. While Marsh was a generally cool-toned player, the critic Scott Yanow notes that Marsh played with "more fire than one would expect" in certain contexts.

Marsh's rhythmically subtle lines are immediately recognizable. He has been called by Anthony Braxton "the greatest vertical improviser" (i.e., improvising that emphasizes harmony/chords more than melody). In the 1970s, he gained renewed exposure as a member of Supersax, a large ensemble which played orchestral arrangements of Charlie Parker solos. Marsh also recorded one of his most celebrated albums, All Music, with the Supersax rhythm section during this period.

Marsh died of a heart attack onstage at the Los Angeles club Donte's in 1987, in the middle of playing the tune "Out of Nowhere". He left a widow, Geraldyne Marsh, and two sons, K.C. Marsh and Jason Marsh. He is interred at Forest Lawn Memorial Park in Glendale, California.

Though he remains something of a cult figure among jazz fans and musicians, his influence has grown since his death; younger players such as Mark Turner have borrowed from his music as a way of counterbalancing the pervasive influence of John Coltrane. Marsh's discography remains somewhat scattered and elusive, as much of it was done for small labels, but more and more of his work has been issued on compact disc in recent years.

A documentary is being made about him: Warne Marsh: An Improvised Life, directed by his eldest son, K.C. Marsh.

== Discography ==
=== As leader/co-leader ===
- 1952 - Live in Hollywood (Xanadu, 1979)
- 1955 - Lee Konitz with Warne Marsh (Atlantic) with Lee Konitz
- 1956 - Jazz of Two Cities (Imperial) also released as The Winds of Marsh (Imperial, 1959)
- 1956 - Art Pepper with Warne Marsh (Contemporary, 1986)
- 1957 - The Right Combination (Riverside) with Joe Albany
- 1957 - Music for Prancing (Mode, 1957)
- 1957-58 - Warne Marsh (Atlantic)
- 1959 - The Art of Improvising (Revelation, 1974) - excerpts with only the W. M. solos
- 1959 - The Art of Improvising Volume 2 (Revelation, 1977) - excerpts with only the W. M. solos
- 1959-60 - Release Record Send Tape (Wave, 1969)
- 1960 - Jazz from the East Village (Wave, 1969)
- 1962 - Live in Las Vegas, 1962 (Naked City Jazz, 2000)
- 1969 - Ne Plus Ultra (Revelation, 1970) - reissued with the same title by Hat Hut in 2006, and by Endless Happiness in 2023
- 1972 - Report of the 1st Annual Symposium On Relaxed Improvisation (Revelation, 1972) with Clare Fischer and Gary Foster
- 1975 - Two not One (4CD) (Storyville, 2017) with Lee Konitz - contains the following five records
- Warne Marsh Quintet: Jazz Exchange Vol. 1 (Storyville, 1975 [1976]) with Lee Konit
- Live at the Montmartre Club: Jazz Exchange Vol. 2 (Storyville, 1975 [1977]) with Lee Konitz
- Warne Marsh Lee Konitz: Jazz Exchange Vol. 3 (Storyville, 1975 [1985]) with Lee Konitz later as Live at Montmartre, Vol. 3 (Storyville, 1995)
- The Unissued 1975 Copenhagen Studio Recordings (Storyville, 1975 [1997]) Warne Marsh Quartet
- The Unissued 1975 Copenhagen Studio Recordings (Storyville, 1975 [1997]) Warne Marsh trio
- Marshlands (Storyville, 1975 [2003]) - anthology of Storyville records
- 1976 - All Music (Nessa, 1976) reissued by Nessa Records as CD in 2004
- 1976 - Lee Konitz Meets Warne Marsh Again (Produttori Associati, 1976) Reissued by Pausa Records in 1977, 1978 and 1984
- 1976 - Tenor Gladness (Discomate, 1976) with Lew Tabackin
- 1977 - Warne Out (Interplay, 1977)
- 1977-79 Noteworthy (Discovery, 1988) plus three tracks recordend in 1956
- 1978 - Apogee (Warner Bros., 1978) with Pete Christlieb
- 1978 - Conversations with Warne Volume 1 (Criss Cross, 1991) with Pete Christlieb
- 1978 - Conversations with Warne Volume 2 (Criss Cross Jazz, 1991) with Pete Christlieb
- 1976/79 - How Deep, How High (Interplay, 1980) with Sal Mosca
- 1980 - Berlin 1980 (Gambit, 2006)
- 1980 - I Got a Good One for You (Storyville, 1999) - reissued as In Copenhagen (Storyville, 2007)
- 1980 - Red Mitchell/Warne Marsh Big Two (Storyville, 1987)
- 1980 - Red Mitchell-Warne Marsh Big Two, Vol. 2 (Storyville, 1998)
- 1980 - Duo Live at Sweet Basil 1980 (Fresh Sound, 2004)
- 1980 - I Remember You... (Spotlite) with Karin Krog and Red Mitchell
- 1982.08 - Star Highs (Criss Cross Jazz, 1982)
- 1982.10 - Warne Marsh Meets Gary Foster (East Wind, 1982) with Gary Foster
- 1982.08 - A Ballad Album (Criss Cross, 1983) with Lou Levy
- 1983.05 - In Norway_Sax of A Kind (Hot Club Records, 1983)
- 1985.03 - Posthumous (Interplay, 1989) released with additional tracks as Newly Warne (Storyville, 1989)
- 1985.12 - Ballad for You (Interplay, 1995) with Susan Chen
- 1986.01 - Warne Marsh & Susan Chen (Interplay, 1987) with Susan Chen
- 1986.03 - Back Home (Criss Cross, 1986)
- 1987.06 - Two Days in the Life of... (Interplay, 1987) reissued by Storyville in 1989 and by AbsordMusic in 2010
- 1987.09 - For the Time Being (Hot Club, 1988)
- 1987.10 - Final Interplay (JAZZBANK/Five Spot, 2004)
- 1987.12 - Personnel Statement (JAZZBANK/Archives, 2002)

=== As co-leader/sideman ===
With Elek Bacsik

- 1975 - Bird and Dizzy – a Musical Tribute (Flying Dutchman, 1975)

With Chet Baker

- Blues for a Reason (Criss Cross Jazz, 1985)

With Bill Evans

- Crosscurrents (Fantasy, 1977)

With Clare Fischer

- 1967 - Duality (Trend/Discovery DS-807, 1980)
- 1967 - Thesaurus (Atlantic, 1969)

With Lee Konitz

- 1949 - Subconscious-Lee (Prestige, 1950)
- 1959 - Live at the Half Note (Verve, 1994)
- 1959 - Lee Konitz Meets Jimmy Giuffre (Verve, ?)
- 1974 - Unreleased Art: Volume 9 (Widow's Taste, ?)
- 1976 - London Concert (Wave, ?)

With Supersax

- 1973 - Supersax Plays Bird (Capitol, ?)
- 1973 - Supersax Plays Bird : Salt Peanuts vol. 2 (Capitol, ?)
- 1974 - Supersax Plays Bird With Strings (Capitol, ?)
- 1975 - Live in '75: The Japanese Tour (Hindsight, ?)

With Lennie Tristano

- 1946-70 - Personal Recordings (Mosaic, 2021) (6CD Box set) Warne Marsh only in CD3 (1949-50) and in part of CD6 (1948)
- 1949 - Crosscurrents (Capitol, 1972)
- 1949 - Lennie Tristano Quintet Live At Birdland 1949 (Jazz Records, 1979)
- 1951 - Chicago April 1951 (Uptown, 2014)
- 1952 - Quintet Live In Toronto 1952 (Jazz records, 1982)
- 1958 - Continuity (Jazz Records, 1985)
- 1955-62 - The Complete Atlantic Recordings Of Lennie Tristano, Lee Konitz & Warne Marsh (Mosaic, 1997) (6CD Box set) Contains Lee Konitz & Warne Marsh (1955), Warne Marsh (1958) plus other without Marsh
