= Art Pepper + Eleven – Modern Jazz Classics =

Art Pepper + Eleven - Modern Jazz Classics

Studio album by Art Pepper
- Released: January/February 1960
- Recorded: March 14, March 28, & May 12, 1959
- Genre: Jazz
- Length: 53:55
- Label: Contemporary/OJC
- Producer: Lester Koenig

Art Pepper chronology
Mucho Calor (1957)	Art Pepper + Eleven - Modern Jazz Classics (1960)	Gettin' Together (1960)

Professional ratings
Review scores
Source	Rating
AllMusic	5/5 stars
DownBeat	5/5 stars
The Encyclopedia of Popular Music	5/5 stars
The Rolling Stone Jazz Record Guide	5/5 stars

Art Pepper + Eleven – Modern Jazz Classics is a 1960 jazz album by saxophonist Art Pepper and a small big band performing arrangements by Marty Paich, who also directed the ensemble.

== Background ==
The recording is one of several dates Pepper made with Paich in 1959 and is the only one with Pepper as leader. The recording focuses on Paich's large group arrangements of modern jazz classics, including Denzil Best's "Move," Thelonious Monk's "'Round Midnight," Gerry Mulligan's "Walkin' Shoes". Other highlights of the recording are Pepper's clarinet performances on "Anthropology" and the alternate takes of "Walkin'." It was released (in the US) February 1960 as Contemporary M3568 (mono) and S7568 (stereo).

== Track listing ==
Side one
No.	Title	Writer(s)	Length
1.	"Move"	Denzil Best	3:26
2.	"Groovin' High"	Dizzy Gillespie	3:22
3.	"Opus De Funk"	Horace Silver	3:13
4.	"'Round Midnight"	Hanighen, Monk, Williams	3:32
5.	"Four Brothers"	Jimmy Giuffre	2:57
6.	"Shawnuff"	Charlie Parker, Dizzy Gillespie	2:58

Side two
No.	Title	Writer(s)	Length
1.	"Bernie's Tune"	Bernie Miller	2:41
2.	"Walkin' Shoes"	Gerry Mulligan	3:31
3.	"Anthropology"	Dizzy Gillespie, Charlie Parker	3:19
4.	"Airegin"	Sonny Rollins	3:01
5.	"Walkin'"	Richard Carpenter	5:15
6.	"Donna Lee"	Charlie Parker	3:23
Total length:			40:15

An expanded compact disc featuring many unreleased "alternate" takes was released on December 1, 1988.

CD expanded release

1. "Move" (Denzil Best) –3:26
2. "Groovin' High" (Dizzy Gillespie) –3:22
3. "Opus de Funk" (Horace Silver) –3:13
4. "'Round Midnight" (Bernie Hanighen, Thelonious Monk, Cootie Williams) –3:32
5. "Four Brothers" (Jimmy Giuffre) –2:57
6. "Shaw 'Nuff" (Charlie Parker, Gillespie) –2:58
7. "Bernie's Tune" (Bernie Miller) –2:44
8. "Walkin' Shoes" (Gerry Mulligan) –3:31
9. "Anthropology" (Gillespie, Parker) –3:19
10. "Airegin" (Sonny Rollins) –3:01
11. "Walkin'" [Original Take] (Richard Carpenter) –5:15
12. "Walkin'" [Alternate Take] (Carpenter) –4:54
13. "Walkin'" [Alternate Take] (Carpenter) –4:58
14. "Donna Lee" [Original Take] (Parker) –3:23
15. "Donna Lee" [Alternate Take] (Parker) –3:22

Recorded on March 14 (#3, 4, 8, 10), March 28 (#2, 6, 9, 14, 15) and May 12, 1959 (#1, 5, 7, 11–13).

== Personnel ==
- Art Pepper — alto saxophone, tenor saxophone, clarinet (all tracks)
- Pete Candoli — trumpet (#3, 4, 8, 10)
- Al Porcino — trumpet (#1, 2, 5, 6, 7, 9, 11–15)
- Jack Sheldon — trumpet (all tracks)
- Dick Nash — trombone (all tracks)
- Bob Enevoldsen — valve trombone, tenor saxophone (all tracks)
- Vincent DeRosa — French horn (all tracks)
- Herb Geller — alto saxophone (#3, 4, 8, 10)
- Bud Shank — alto saxophone (#2, 6, 9, 14, 15)
- Charlie Kennedy — alto saxophone (#1, 5, 7, 11–13)
- Bill Perkins — tenor saxophone (#2–4, 6, 8–10, 14–15)
- Richie Kamuca — tenor saxophone (#1, 5, 7, 11–13)
- Med Flory — baritone saxophone (all tracks)
- Russ Freeman — piano (all tracks)
- Joe Mondragon — bass (all tracks)
- Mel Lewis — drums (all tracks)
- Marty Paich — arranger, conductor (all tracks)

== Sources ==
- Art Pepper & Laurie Pepper. Straight Life. New York, Schirmer, 1979. ISBN 0-306-80558-8
- Art Pepper Discography Page (https://www.jazzdisco.org/pepper/)
