= Straight Life =

Straight Life may refer to:

== Music ==
- "The Straight Life", a 1968 song by Sonny Curtis, covered by Bobby Goldsboro
- Straight Life (Freddie Hubbard album), 1970
- Straight Life (Art Pepper album), 1979
- Straight Life (Jimmy Smith album), 2007 (recorded 1961)

== Other media ==
- Straight Life (book), a 1979 autobiography by Art Pepper and Laurie Pepper
- "Straight Life" (Oz), a television episode
