= Chet Baker Quartet featuring Russ Freeman =

Studio album by Chet Baker
- Released: 1953
- Recorded: July 29 & 30, 1953
- Studio: Capitol, 5515 Melrose, Hollywood; Radio Recorders, Los Angeles
- Genre: Jazz
- Length: 71:22; CD reissue
- Label: Pacific Jazz; PJLP 6
- Producer: Richard Bock

Chet Baker chronology
West Coast Live (1953)	Chet Baker Quartet featuring Russ Freeman (1953)	Pretty/Groovy (1958)

Chet Baker Quartet featuring Russ Freeman is an album by jazz trumpeter Chet Baker originally recorded in 1953 and released as a 10-inch LP on the Pacific Jazz label. Russ Freeman was the pianist in the quartet and the composer of several of the pieces. The album was reissued on CD in 1998 with 17 bonus tracks originally released on the 10-inch LP Chet Baker Quartet featuring Russ Freeman and 12-inch LPs Pretty/Groovy and The Trumpet Artistry of Chet Baker.

== Reception ==
Professional ratings
Review scores
Source	Rating
Allmusic	4/5 stars

Allmusic rated the reissued album with 4 stars stating "The 25 selections here provide copious evidence of Baker's uncanny artistry as he develops a dark, yet lyrical, interpretive approach. Immediately evident is the thoughtful synergy between Baker and the comparatively understated Freeman, whose comps help link the respective solos".

== Track listing ==
All compositions by Russ Freeman except as indicated

1. "Isn't It Romantic?" (Lorenz Hart, Richard Rodgers) – 3:27 Bonus track on CD reissue
2. "The Lamp Is Low" (Peter DeRose, Bert Shefter) – 2:30 Bonus track on CD reissue
3. "This Time the Dream's on Me" (Harold Arlen, Johnny Mercer) – 2:43 Bonus track on CD reissue
4. "Maid in Mexico" – 2:53 Bonus track on CD reissue
5. "Russ Job" – 2:52 Bonus track on CD reissue
6. "Imagination" (Johnny Burke, Jimmy Van Heusen) – 2:59 Bonus track on CD reissue
7. "Long Ago (and Far Away)" [10" LP Take] (Jerome Kern, Ira Gershwin) – 2:11
8. "Long Ago (and Far Away)" [12" LP Take] (Kern, Gershwin) – 2:25 Bonus track on CD reissue
9. "Carson City Stage" (Carson Smith) – 2:35 Bonus track on CD reissue
10. "Easy to Love" (Cole Porter) – 3:08 Bonus track on CD reissue
11. "Batter Up" – 2:15 Bonus track on CD reissue
12. "No Ties" [10" LP Take] – 2:57
13. "No Ties" [12" LP Take] – 2:57 Bonus track on CD reissue
14. "All the Things You Are" (Kern, Oscar Hammerstein II) – 2:53
15. "The Thrill Is Gone" [10" LP Take] (Ray Henderson, Lew Brown) – 2:44
16. "The Thrill Is Gone" [12" LP Take] (Brown, Henderson) – 2:45 Bonus track on CD reissue
17. "Band Aid" – 2:43
18. "Bea's Flat" – 2:57
19. "Moon Love" [10" LP Take] (Pyotr Ilyich Tchaikovsky, Mack Davis, Mack David, André Kostelanetz) – 3:15 Bonus track on CD reissue
20. "Moon Love" [12" LP Take] (Tchaikovsky, Davis, David, Kostelanetz) – 3:16 Bonus track on CD reissue
21. "Happy Little Sunbeam" – 2:40
22. "Happy Little Sunbeam" [Alternate Take] – 2:24 Bonus track on CD reissue
23. "I Fall In Love Too Easily" (Jule Styne, Sammy Cahn) – 2:02 Bonus track on CD reissue
24. "Winter Wonderland" [78 Take] (Felix Bernard, Richard B. Smith) – 3:16 Bonus track on CD reissue
25. "Winter Wonderland" [LP Take] (Bernard, Smith) – 2:26 Bonus track on CD reissue
- Recorded in Los Angeles on July 24 (track 1), July 27 (tracks 2–4), July 29 & 30 (tracks 5–11) and at Radio Recorders in Hollywood on October 3 (tracks 12–22) and October 27 (tracks 23–25), 1953

== Personnel ==
- Chet Baker – trumpet, vocals (on track 23)
- Russ Freeman – piano
- Bob Whitlock (tracks 1–4), Carson Smith (tracks 5–22), Joe Mondragon (tracks 23–25) – bass
- Bobby White (tracks 1–4), Larry Bunker (tracks 5–22), Shelly Manne (tracks 23–25) – drums
