= Walking shoe =

Walking shoe may refer to:

== Footwear ==
- Sneakers, a type of shoe primarily designed for sports but widely used for everyday wear.
- Hiking boot, designed for protecting the feet and ankles during outdoor walking activities.

== See also ==
- Walking shoes (disambiguation)
