= Straight Life (Art Pepper album) =

Studio album by Art Pepper
- Released: 1979
- Recorded: 1979
- Genre: Jazz
- Label: Galaxy
- Producer: Ed Michel

Art Pepper chronology
Besame Mucho (1979)	Straight Life (1979)	Winter Moon (1979)

Straight Life is an album by the American saxophonist Art Pepper, released in 1979. Pepper was joined by Tommy Flanagan, Red Mitchell, Billy Higgins and Kenneth Nash.

Some versions have the bonus track "Long Ago (and Far Away)".

== Title Track ==
Pepper's composition "Straight Life" is a contrafact of "After You've Gone", and it was also recorded for Pepper's 1957 album Art Pepper Meets the Rhythm Section. Pepper re-used the title for his 1979 autobiography Straight Life. Pepper was not the only jazz musician to use the title. Trumpeter Freddie Hubbard and organist Jimmy Smith both released albums and compositions unrelated to Pepper's with the title "Straight Life".

== Critical reception ==
Professional ratings
Review scores
Source	Rating
AllMusic	5/5 stars
DownBeat	4/5 stars
The Penguin Guide to Jazz Recordings	3.5/4 stars
The Rolling Stone Jazz Record Guide	3/5 stars

AllMusic wrote that Straight Life "is pretty definitive and serves as a perfect introduction to Pepper's second (and most rewarding) period."

== Track listing ==
1. "Surf Ride" (Art Pepper) – 6:57
2. "Nature Boy" (eden ahbez) – 9:55
3. "Straight Life" (Art Pepper) – 4:09
4. "September Song" (Kurt Weill, Maxwell Anderson) – 11:00
5. "Make a List" (Art Pepper) – 9:46

(Recorded on September 21, 1979)

== Personnel ==
- Art Pepper – alto saxophone
- Tommy Flanagan – piano
- Red Mitchell – bass
- Billy Higgins – drums
- Kenneth Nash – cowbell, reco-reco (on "Make a List" only)

== Sources ==
- Richard Cook & Brian Morton. The Penguin Guide to Jazz on CD. Penguin, 4th edition, 1998. ISBN 0-14-051383-3
