= Landscape (Art Pepper album) =

Live album by Art Pepper
- Released: 1979
- Recorded: July 16 & July 23, 1979
- Venues: Shiba Yūbin Chokin Hall, Minato, Tokyo
- Genre: Jazz
- Length: 52:33; 63:39 CD reissue
- Label: Galaxy/OJC
- Producers: Akira Taguchi, Hiroshi Aono

Art Pepper chronology
Art Pepper Today (1978)	Landscape (1979)	Besame Mucho (1979)

Landscape is a live 1979 jazz album by saxophonist Art Pepper, playing with George Cables, Tony Dumas, and Billy Higgins. The album was recorded at Shiba Yūbin Chokin Hall, Tokyo, at the same concerts that produced Besame Mucho.

== Reception ==
Professional ratings
Review scores
Source	Rating
AllMusic	4.5/5 stars
The Penguin Guide to Jazz Recordings	3/4 stars
The Rolling Stone Jazz Record Guide	4/5 stars

AllMusic reviewer Scott Yanow commented that "Pepper was in inspired form during this Tokyo concert" and that his "intensity and go-for-broke style are exhilarating throughout".

== Track listing ==
1. "True Blues" (Art Pepper) – 8:07
2. "Sometime" (Pepper) – 5:05
3. "Landscape" (Pepper) – 10:26
4. "Avalon" (Vincent Rose; Al Jolson; Buddy DeSylva) – 8:40
5. "Over the Rainbow" (Harold Arlen; E.Y. Harburg) – 10:47
6. "Straight Life" (Pepper) – 6:19
7. "Mambo de la Pinta" (Pepper) – 11:06 Bonus track on CD reissue

(Recorded on July 16 & July 23, 1979)

== Personnel ==
- Art Pepper – alto saxophone; clarinet on "Sometime"
- George Cables – piano
- Tony Dumas – electric upright bass (credited as "blitz bass")
- Billy Higgins – drums

== Sources ==
- Richard Cook & Brian Morton. The Penguin Guide to Jazz on CD. Penguin, 4th edition, 1998. ISBN 0-14-051383-3
