= Gettin' Together (Art Pepper album) =

Studio album by Art Pepper
- Released: 1960
- Recorded: February 29, 1960
- Genre: Jazz
- Length: 58:05
- Label: Contemporary/OJC
- Producer: Lester Koenig

Art Pepper chronology
Art Pepper + Eleven - Modern Jazz Classics (1959)	Gettin' Together (1960)	Smack Up (1960)

Professional ratings
Review scores
Source	Rating
AllMusic	4.5/5 stars
DownBeat	3/5 stars
Tom Hull	B+
The Penguin Guide to Jazz Recordings	3.5/4 stars
The Rolling Stone Jazz Record Guide	5/5 stars

Gettin' Together is a 1960 jazz album by saxophonist Art Pepper playing with trumpeter Conte Candoli, pianist Wynton Kelly, bassist Paul Chambers and drummer Jimmy Cobb (whose name is spelled "Jimmie" on the original album cover.)

The liner notes by Martin Williams describe the album as "a sort of sequel to the earlier Art Pepper Meets the Rhythm Section″, which also featured the Miles Davis rhythm section of its time.

== Track listing ==
1. "Whims of Chambers" (Paul Chambers) – 6:56
2. "Bijou the Poodle" (Art Pepper) – 5:48
3. "Why Are We Afraid" (Dory Langdon; André Previn) – 3:36
4. "Softly, as in a Morning Sunrise" (Sigmund Romberg; Oscar Hammerstein II) – 6:55
5. "Rhythm-a-Ning" (Thelonious Monk) – 7:15
6. "Diane" (Art Pepper) – 5:03
7. "Gettin' Together" (Art Pepper) – 7 :50

(Recorded on February 29, 1960.)

== Personnel ==
- Art Pepper – alto & tenor saxophone
- Conte Candoli – trumpet
- Wynton Kelly – piano
- Paul Chambers – bass
- Jimmy Cobb – drums
