= Bernie's Tune =

Song written by Bernie Miller

"Bernie's Tune" is a jazz standard with music by Bernie Miller, and lyrics added later by Jerry Leiber and Mike Stoller. It was popularised by the American saxophonist and composer Gerry Mulligan, who recorded it several times. The tune was a popular choice for musicians jamming at the time. Information about the composer ("Bernie" Miller) is scarce: all that people really know of him is that he was a piano player from Washington DC. Mulligan speculated that by the time he had discovered any of Bernie's tunes, Bernie was dead. Later on in Mulligan's life, he took the same changes but invented a new melody to fit over the piece, entitling it 'Idol Gossip'.

== Composition ==
The song is typically played in D minor, and has a 32 bar AABA structure. Harmonically, the first two bars start on the tonic chord, bars three and four are a dominant 7th chord on the flat 6th scale degree. Here the melody contains the flatted fifth scale degree (A♭)—the seventh of the B♭7 chord—a blue note. The last half of the A section ends with a V–i (or sometimes a ii–V–i). The B section of the piece is a standard 1–6–2–5 in B♭ repeating 3 times, then leading to a B♭ chord, and a minor ii–V back to D minor.

== Versions ==
- Gerry Mulligan Quartet, on Bernie's Tune, 1952.
- Al Haig, on Al Haig: Live in Hollywood, 1952.
- Red Rodney, on The New Sounds, 1952 (titled "The Baron").
- Konitz Meets Mulligan, 1953
- Cal Tjader, on Ritmo Caliente, 1955.
- Gene Krupa and Buddy Rich, on Krupa and Rich, 1955.
- Mel Tormé, on Gene Norman presents Mel Tormé at the Lighthouse, 1955.
- Milt Buckner, on Rockin' With Milt, 1955.
- Shelly Manne & His Men, on Swinging Sounds, 1956.
- Ella Fitzgerald, on Ella At Zardi's (Live at Zardi's 1956), 2018
- Stan Kenton, on Kenton Live from the Las Vegas Tropicana, 1958
- Art Pepper, on Art Pepper + Eleven – Modern Jazz Classics, 1959.
- George Shearing, on On the Sunny Side of the Strip, 1960.
- George Barnes and Carl Kress, on George Barnes & Carl Kress: Town Hall Concert, 1963.
- Billy Strange, on The James Bond Theme/Walk Don't Run, 1964.
- Earl Hines, on Here Comes Earl "Fatha" Hines, 1966.
- Frank Morgan, on Frank Morgan, 1975.
- Anachronic Jazz Band, on Anthropology, 1976.
- Clare Fischer, on Crazy Bird, 1985.
- Scott Hamilton, on East of the Sun, 1993.
- Karrin Allyson, on Azure-Té, 1995.
- Chris Flory, on Blues in My Heart, 2003.
- Harvey Mason and Kenny Baron, on With all My Heart, 2003.
- Greg Osby, on Public, 2004.
- Tommy Emmanuel and Martin Taylor, on The Colonel and the Governor, 2013.
- Zoot Sims and His Orchestra, on New Beat Bossa Nova Vol. 2, 1962.

== See also ==
- List of jazz standards
