= A Night in Tunisia (disambiguation) =

"A Night in Tunisia" is a musical composition written by Dizzy Gillespie.

A Night in Tunisia may also refer to:

- A Night in Tunisia (1957 album), by Art Blakey & the Jazz Messengers
- A Night in Tunisia (1960 album), by Art Blakey & the Jazz Messengers
- Night in Tunisia (short story collection), a 1976 book by Neil Jordan
- Night in Tunisia: Digital Recording, 1979, by Art Blakey & the Jazz Messengers
- A Night in Tunisia (Art Pepper album), recorded in 1977 and released in 1983
