= Two Altos =

Studio album by Art Pepper and Sonny Red
- Released: 1959
- Recorded: March 4, 1952 (#5); March 29, 1953 (#3); August 25, 1954 (#1, 6); Los Angeles, CA; November 12, 1957 (#2, 4); Van Gelder Studio, Hackensack, NJ
- Genre: Jazz
- Length: 32:01
- Label: Regent; Regent MG 6069
- Producer: Ozzie Cadena

Art Pepper chronology
Surf Ride (1952–54)	Two Altos (1959)	The Return of Art Pepper (1956)

Sonny Red chronology
Two Altos (1957)	Out of the Blue (1960)

Two Altos is an album by American alto saxophonists Art Pepper and Sonny Red. The four standards which appear on the album were recorded in Los Angeles with West Coast-jazz musicians between 1952 and 1954, whilst the two originals were recorded at Van Gelder Studio, in 1957. Regent Records, a subsidiary of Savoy, released these recordings in 1959.

Professional ratings
Review scores
Source	Rating
AllMusic	3/5 stars

== Track listing ==
1. "Deep Purple" (Robbins, Parish) - 3:58
2. "Watkins Production" (Doug Watkins) - 9:36
3. "Everything Happens to Me" (Dennis, Adair) - 3:08
4. "Redd's Head" (Sonny Red) - 9:13
5. "These Foolish Things" (Maschwitz, Link, Strachey) - 2:41
6. "What's New" (Haggart, Burke) - 3:25

== Personnel ==
Tracks 1, 6

- Art Pepper - alto saxophone
- Jack Montrose - tenor saxophone
- Claude Williamson - piano
- Monty Budwig - bass
- Larry Bunker - drums

Tracks 2, 4

- Sonny Red - alto saxophone
- Pepper Adams - baritone saxophone
- Wynton Kelly - piano
- Doug Watkins - bass
- Elvin Jones - drums

Track 3

- Art Pepper - alto saxophone
- Russ Freeman - piano
- Bob Whitlock - bass
- Bobby White - drums

Track 5

- Art Pepper - alto saxophone
- Hampton Hawes - piano
- Joe Mondragon - bass
- Larry Bunker - drums
