= Art Pepper with Warne Marsh =

Studio album by Art Pepper with Warne Marsh
- Released: 1986
- Recorded: November 26, 1956
- Studio: Los Angeles, CA
- Genre: Jazz
- Length: 54:24
- Label: Contemporary; VICJ 23640
- Producer: Lester Koenig

Warne Marsh chronology
Jazz of Two Cities (1956)	Art Pepper with Warne Marsh (1986)	The Right Combination (1957)

Art Pepper chronology
The Art Pepper Quartet (1956)	Art Pepper with Warne Marsh (1956)	Collections (1957)

Art Pepper with Warne Marsh is an album by alto saxophonist Art Pepper and tenor saxophonist Warne Marsh which was recorded in 1956 but not released on the Contemporary label in Japan until 1986. The rhythm section is pianist Ronnie Ball, bassist Ben Tucker and drummer Gary Frommer. Several tracks were released on Pepper's 1972 compilation The Way It Was!, the title of the US CD reissue of this material.

== Reception ==
Professional ratings
Review scores
Source	Rating
AllMusic	3/5 stars

The AllMusic review noted "Marvelous work between Pepper and Warne Marsh".

== Track listing ==
1. "I Can't Believe That You're in Love with Me" [original take] (Jimmy McHugh, Clarence Gaskill) – 5:23
2. "I Can't Believe That You're In Love With Me" [alternate take] (McHugh, Gaskill) – 5:33
3. "All the Things You Are" [original take] (Jerome Kern, Oscar Hammerstein II) – 6:32
4. "All the Things You Are" [alternate take] (Kern, Hammerstein) – 6:26
5. "What's New?" (Bob Haggart, Johnny Burke) – 4:04
6. "Avalon" (Buddy DeSylva, Vincent Rose, Al Jolson) – 3:50
7. "Tickle Toe" (Lester Young) – 4:50
8. "Warnin'" [take 1] (Art Pepper) – 6:06
9. "Warnin'" [take 2] (Pepper) – 5:50
10. "Stompin' at the Savoy" (Edgar Sampson, Benny Goodman, Chick Webb, Andy Razaf) – 5:50

== Personnel ==
- Art Pepper – alto saxophone
- Warne Marsh – tenor saxophone (tracks 1–4 & 6–9)
- Ronnie Ball – piano
- Ben Tucker – bass
- Gary Frommer – drums
