= Among Friends =

Among Friends may refer to:

- Among Friends (Art Pepper album)
- Among Friends (Cedar Walton album)
