= Charlie Rice =

American jazz drummer (1920–2018)

- Born: March 1, 1920; Philadelphia, Pennsylvania, U.S.
- Died: April 22, 2018 (aged 98) U.S.
- Genre: Jazz
- Occupation: Musician
- Instrument: Drums
- Years active: 1948–2018

Charles R. Rice (March 1, 1920 – April 22, 2018), better known as Charlie Rice, was an American jazz drummer.

Having played with Jimmy Oliver, Rice led the first house band at Philadelphia's Club 421, with a lineup including Vance Wilson, Bob Bushnell, Red Garland and Johnny Hughes.

After playing with Eddie Vinson's and Jimmy Heath's big bands (with John Coltrane in both lineups) in 1951 he went with Oscar Pettiford, Rudy Williams, Clifton Best, J.J. Johnson and Howard McGhee on a USO tour to the South Pacific, as part of a unit known as the "Swingin' Jamboree". The concerts were recorded and released the following year as Howard McGhee and his Korean All Stars, Jazz At the Battlefront Volume 1.

Back in Philadelphia, he led the Charlie Rice All-Stars.

As well as playing with Sonny Stitt, Eddie "Lockjaw" Davis (again with John Coltrane), and Leo Parker, in 1964 and 1965 he toured and recorded with Chet Baker.

As of October 2011, Rice was still performing. He died in April 2018 at the age of 98. He was buried at Harleigh Cemetery, Camden.

== Discography ==
With Chet Baker

- The Most Important Jazz Album of 1964/65 (Colpix, 1964)
- I/We Had a Ball (Limelight, 1965) - 1 track
- Baby Breeze (Limelight, 1965)

With Sonny Stitt and Eddie Davis

- The Battle of Birdland (Roost, 1954)

With Eddie Davis

- Modern Jazz Expressions (King Records, 1956)
- Uptown (King Records, 1958)
- This and That (King Records, 1959)
- Goodies From Eddie Davis (Roulette, 1999)

With The Gordons

- The Gordons (Crusade Enterprises, 1977)

With Al Grey / Jimmy Forrest

- O.D. (Out 'Dere) (Greyforrest Records, 1980)

With Eddie "Lockjaw" Davis and Shirley Scott

- The Best of Eddie "Lockjaw Davis – Shirley Scott (Bethlehem Records and Solid Records, 2013)
