= The Most Important Jazz Album of 1964/65 =

Studio album by Chet Baker
- Released: 1964
- Recorded: June 1964
- Studio: NYC
- Genre: Jazz
- Length: 43:22
- Label: Colpix; CP-476/SCP-476
- Producer: Jack Lewis

Chet Baker chronology
Brussels 1964 (1964)	The Most Important Jazz Album of 1964/65 (1964)	Baby Breeze (1964)

The Most Important Jazz Album of 1964/65 is an album by trumpeter/vocalist Chet Baker which was recorded in 1964 and released on the Colpix label.

== Reception ==
Professional ratings
Review scores
Source	Rating
Allmusic	4/5 stars
The Penguin Guide to Jazz Recordings	3/4 stars

The Allmusic review by Matt Collar states: "the icon of '50s cool attempted to reinvigorate his career and showcase his musical growth by enlisting the sensitive piano chops of Hal Galper and old collaborator tenor saxophonist Phil Urso. The new sideman, combined with a heavy dose of Tadd Dameron's compositions, gave Baker a more muscular edge that rubbed nicely with his trademark lyricism updating his sound for the hard bop '60s".

== Track listing ==
All compositions by Tadd Dameron except where noted

1. "Soultrane" – 4:42
2. "Walkin'" (Richard Carpenter) – 2:58
3. "Tadd's Delight" – 3:55
4. "Whatever Possessed Me" (Tadd Dameron, Bernie Hanighen) – 4:03
5. "Retsim B" (Hal Galper) – 5:49
6. "Gnid" – 5:01
7. "Ann, Wonderful One" (Richard Carpenter, Earl Hines) – 4:46
8. "Mating Call" – 3:57
9. "Margerine" (Galper) – 4:35
10. "Flight to Jordan" (Duke Jordan) – 3:36

== Personnel ==
- Chet Baker – flugelhorn, vocals
- Phil Urso – tenor saxophone, clarinet
- Hal Galper – piano
- Jymie Merritt – bass
- Charlie Rice – drums
