= Intensity (Art Pepper album) =

Studio album by Art Pepper
- Released: 1963
- Recorded: November 23–25, 1960
- Studios: Contemporary Records Studio; Los Angeles, CA
- Genre: Jazz
- Length: 37:51
- Label: Contemporary/OJC
- Producer: Lester Koenig

Art Pepper chronology
Smack Up (1959)	Intensity (1963)	Living Legend (1975)

Intensity is a 1960 jazz album by saxophonist Art Pepper playing with pianist Dolo Coker, bassist Jimmy Bond and drummer Frank Butler. The album was released in 1963.

== Reception ==
Professional ratings
Review scores
Source	Rating
AllMusic	4.5/5 stars
DownBeat	4/5 stars
The Penguin Guide to Jazz on CD. Fourth Edition, 1998	4/4 stars
The Rolling Stone Jazz Record Guide	4/5 stars

The sleeve notes (by Lester Koenig) quote Richard Hadlock, jazz editor of the San Francisco Examiner, who writes:

"As this and his last Contemporary release Smack Up!, demonstrate, Art was well on his way toward a new kind of playing freedom in 1960. He had, partly through the examples of John Coltrane and Ornette Coleman, begun to set aside his few remaining inhibitions and reach out for still more direct contact with his emotions... A musician friend told me recently that sometimes Pepper's playing 'sounds like a man crying — it just tears you up.' I agree."

AllMusic reviewer Scott Yanow called the album an "interesting and largely enjoyable set". Yanow also echoed Hadlock's comments, writing that "Pepper was just starting to show the influence of John Coltrane and Ornette Coleman in his style, freeing up his playing and displaying a greater intensity during his improvisations."

== Track listing ==
1. "I Can't Believe That You're in Love with Me" (Jimmy McHugh; Clarence Gaskill) – 4:25
2. "I Love You" (Cole Porter) – 5:25
3. "Come Rain or Come Shine" (Harold Arlen; Johnny Mercer) – 4:45
4. "Long Ago (And Far Away)" (Jerome Kern; Ira Gershwin) – 4:24
5. "Gone with the Wind" (Allie Wrubel; Herb Magidson) – 6:00
6. "I Wished on the Moon" (Ralph Rainger; Dorothy Parker) – 5:37
7. "Too Close for Comfort" (Jerry Bock; Larry Holofcener; George David Weiss) – 6:46

(Recorded on 23–25 November 1960.)

== Personnel ==
- Art Pepper – alto saxophone
- Dolo Coker – piano
- Jimmy Bond – bass
- Frank Butler – drums

== Sources ==
- Richard Cook & Brian Morton. The Penguin Guide to Jazz on CD. Penguin, 4th edition, 1998. ISBN 0-14-051383-3
