= So in Love (Art Pepper album) =

Studio album by Art Pepper
- Released: 1980
- Recorded: February 23 and May 26, 1979
- Studio: Sound Ideas Studios, NYC; Kendun Recorders, Burbank, CA
- Genre: Jazz
- Length: 47:37
- Label: Artists House; AH 12
- Producer: John Snyder

Art Pepper chronology
New York Album (1979)	So in Love (1980)	Artworks (1979)

So in Love is an album by saxophonist Art Pepper recorded in 1979 and originally released on the Artists House label.

== Reception ==
Professional ratings
Review scores
Source	Rating
AllMusic	4/5 stars
The Rolling Stone Jazz Record Guide	4/5 stars

The AllMusic review by Scott Yanow noted: "Pepper is in excellent form throughout the album, giving these songs heart-wrenching interpretations".

== Track listing ==
All compositions by Art Pepper except where noted.

1. "Straight, No Chaser" (Thelonious Monk) - 6:24
2. "Blues for Blanche" - 6:47
3. "So in Love" (Cole Porter) - 11:35
4. "Diane" - 12:16
5. "Stardust" (Hoagy Carmichael, Mitchell Parish) - 10:35
- Recorded at Sound Ideas Studios, NYC on February 23, 1979 (tracks 1 & 4) and at Kendun Recorders, Burbank, CA on May 26, 1979 (tracks 2, 3 & 5)

== Personnel ==
- Art Pepper - alto saxophone
- Hank Jones (tracks 1 & 4), George Cables (tracks 2, 3 & 5) - piano
- Ron Carter (tracks 1 & 4), Charlie Haden (tracks 2, 3 & 5) - bass
- Al Foster (tracks 1 & 4), Billy Higgins (tracks 2, 3 & 5) - drums
