= Vance Wilson (musician) =

American saxophonist (1925–2010)

- Born: February 28, 1925; Lancaster, Pennsylvania, U.S.
- Died: August 10, 2010 (aged 85); Philadelphia, Pennsylvania, U.S.
- Genres: Jazz
- Occupation: Saxophonist
- Instrument(s): Tenor sax, alto sax
- Years active: 1948–1960s

Vance E. Wilson (February 28, 1925 – August 10, 2010) was an American jazz alto and tenor sax player based in Philadelphia most known for playing lead tenor and alto sax on Clifford Brown's first recording in 1952, The Beginning and the End (Columbia, 1973), as a member of Chris Powell's Five Blue Flames, together with Osie Johnson at a double recording session in Chicago.

After settling in Philadelphia in around 1946, Wilson studied classical music at the Ornstein School of Music together with John Coltrane and Bill Barron. He also played in the first house band at Philadelphia's Club 421, a lineup led by Charlie Rice, and featuring Bob Bushnell (musician), Red Garland and Johnny Hughes, as well as leading his own bands there.

In 1958 he joined Steve Gibson and the Red Caps.

A friend of Count Basie's, he didn't join his orchestra because he was tired of touring, one of the reasons he retired from the music business in the 1960s.
