= Artworks (album) =

Studio album by Art Pepper
- Released: 1984
- Recorded: May 25 & 26, 1979; Kendun Recorders, Burbank, CA
- Genre: Jazz
- Length: 39:15
- Label: Galaxy; GXY 5148
- Producer: John Snyder, Laurie Pepper

Art Pepper chronology
So in Love (1979)	Artworks (1984)	Stardust (1979)

Artworks is an album by saxophonist Art Pepper, recorded in 1979 at the sessions that produced So in Love but not released on the Galaxy label until 1984.

== Reception ==
Professional ratings
Review scores
Source	Rating
AllMusic	3/5 stars
The Rolling Stone Jazz Record Guide	3/5 stars

The AllMusic review by Scott Yanow said, "The performances on this Galaxy LP are essentially outtakes and leftovers from Art Pepper's 1979 sessions for Artists House, but the quality is quite high. 'Body and Soul' and 'You Go to My Head' are particularly special, for they are unaccompanied alto solos, and on 'Anthropology', Pepper has a rare outing on clarinet".

== Track listing ==
CD / LP / Digital Track List:

1. "Body and Soul" (Johnny Green, Edward Heyman, Robert Sour, Frank Eyton) - 4:35
2. "Anthropology" (Charlie Parker, Dizzy Gillespie) - 6:32
3. "Desafinado" (Antônio Carlos Jobim, Newton Mendonça) - 7:59
4. "Donna Lee" (Parker) - 5:55
5. "You Go to My Head" (John Frederick Coots, Haven Gillespie) - 5:58
6. "Blues for Blanche" [Alternate Take] (Art Pepper) - 7:26

CD / Digital Only Bonus Tracks

1. "Desafinado"
2. "Anthropology"
3. "Donna Lee"
4. "Blues for Blanche"
5. "You Go to My Head"

== Personnel ==
- Art Pepper - alto saxophone (tracks 1 & 3–6), clarinet (track 2)
- George Cables - piano (tracks 3, 4 & 6)
- Charlie Haden - bass (tracks 2–4 & 6)
- Billy Higgins - drums (tracks 2–4 & 6)
