= Modern Art (Art Pepper album) =

Studio album by Art Pepper
- Released: 1957
- Recorded: December 28, 1956 and January 14, 1957
- Studio: Radio Recorders and Master Recorders, Los Angeles, CA
- Genre: Jazz
- Length: 37:25
- Label: Intro; ILP-606
- Producer: Don Clarke

Art Pepper chronology
Collections (1957)	Modern Art (1957)	Art Pepper Meets the Rhythm Section (1957)

Modern Art is an album by saxophonist Art Pepper featuring sessions recorded in late 1956 and early 1957 originally released on the Intro label. The album was reissued on CD on Blue Note Records with bonus tracks as Modern Art: The Complete Art Pepper Aladdin Recordings Volume 2 in 1988.

Professional ratings
Review scores
Source	Rating
AllMusic	3/5 stars
The Penguin Guide to Jazz Recordings	4/4 stars

== Track listing ==
All compositions by Art Pepper, except where indicated.

1. "Blues In" - 5:40
2. "Bewitched" (Richard Rodgers, Lorenz Hart) - 4:25
3. "When You're Smiling" (Larry Shay, Mark Fisher, Joe Goodwin) - 4:47
4. "Cool Bunny" - 4:10
5. "Dianne's Dilemma" - 3:46
6. "Stompin' at the Savoy" (Edgar Sampson, Chick Webb, Benny Goodman, Andy Razaf) - 5:01
7. "What Is This Thing Called Love?" (Cole Porter) - 6:00
8. "Blues Out" - 4:53

== Personnel ==
- Art Pepper - alto saxophone
- Russ Freeman - piano
- Ben Tucker - bass
- Chuck Flores - drums
