= The Art Pepper Quartet =

Studio album by Art Pepper
- Released: 1957
- Recorded: November 23, 1956
- Studio: Radio Recorders, Los Angeles, CA
- Genre: Jazz
- Length: 43:29
- Label: Tampa; TP 20
- Producer: Robert Scherman

Art Pepper chronology
Playboys (1956)	The Art Pepper Quartet (1957)	Art Pepper with Warne Marsh (1957)

The Art Pepper Quartet is an album by saxophonist Art Pepper, recorded for the Tampa label in 1956. Pepper’s Quartet are pianist Russ Freeman, bassist Ben Tucker and drummer Gary Frommer. The album was reissued on CD in the Original Jazz Classics series with bonus tracks in 1994.

== Reception ==
Professional ratings
Review scores
Source	Rating
AllMusic	3/5 stars
The Penguin Guide to Jazz Recordings	3/4 stars

The AllMusic review by Scott Yanow observed: "The quality of the music here is high, if brief -- even with his erratic lifestyle, Pepper never made a bad record ... Fine music, but not essential when one considers how many gems Art Pepper recorded during his rather hectic life".

== Track listing ==
All compositions by Art Pepper, except where indicated.

1. "Art's Opus" - 5:48
2. "I Surrender Dear" (Harry Barris, Gordon Clifford) - 5:31
3. "Diane" - 3:35
4. "Pepper Pot" - 5:03
5. "Bésame Mucho" (Consuelo Velázquez, Sunny Skylar) - 4:00
6. "Blues at Twilight" - 3:58
7. "Val's Pal" - 2:03
8. "Pepper Pot" [alternate take] - 2:27 Bonus track on CD reissue
9. "Blues at Twilight" [alternate take] - 4:02 Bonus track on CD reissue
10. "Val's Pal" [take 1] - 2:26 Bonus track on CD reissue
11. "Val's Pal" [take 4] - 2:22 Bonus track on CD reissue
12. "Val's Pal" [take 5] - 2:14 Bonus track on CD reissue

== Personnel ==
- Art Pepper - alto saxophone
- Russ Freeman - piano
- Ben Tucker - bass
- Gary Frommer - drums
