= Pretty/Groovy =

Compilation album by Chet Baker
- Released: 1958
- Recorded: July 27, 29 & 30, October 3 & 27, 1953, February 15, 1954, and December 9, 1957
- Studio: Capitol (New York); Radio Recorders (Los Angeles)
- Genre: Jazz
- Label: World Pacific; WP 1249
- Producer: Richard Bock

Chet Baker chronology
Chet Baker Quartet featuring Russ Freeman (1953)	Pretty/Groovy (1958)	The Trumpet Artistry of Chet Baker (1953–54)

Pretty/Groovy is an album by jazz trumpeter Chet Baker recorded in 1953 and 1954 (with one track from 1957) and released on the World Pacific label in 1958. The album compiles tracks previously released on the 1953 10-inch LP Chet Baker Quartet featuring Russ Freeman along with previously unissued recordings.

== Reception ==
Professional ratings
Review scores
Source	Rating
Allmusic	3/5 stars

Allmusic rated the album with 3 stars.

== Track listing ==
1. "Look for the Silver Lining" (Buddy DeSylva, Jerome Kern) – 2:42
2. "Time After Time" (Sammy Cahn, Jule Styne) – 2:48
3. "Travelin' Light" (Trummy Young, Jimmy Mundy, Johnny Mercer) – 3:10
4. "My Funny Valentine" (Lorenz Hart, Richard Rodgers) – 2:21
5. "There Will Never Be Another You" (Harry Warren, Mack Gordon) – 3:01
6. "The Thrill Is Gone" (Lew Brown, Ray Henderson) – 2:48
7. "But Not for Me" (George Gershwin, Ira Gershwin) – 3:05
8. "Band Aid" (Russ Freeman) – 2:45
9. "The Lamp Is Low" (Peter DeRose, Bert Shefter) – 2:33
10. "Carson City Stage" (Carson Smith) – 2:37
11. "Long Ago (and Far Away)" (Jerome Kern, Ira Gershwin) – 2:15
12. "Easy to Love" (Cole Porter) – 3:03
13. "Winter Wonderland" (Felix Bernard, Richard B. Smith) – 2:28
14. "Batter Up" (Freeman) – 2:56
- Recorded in Los Angeles on July 27, 29 & 30, 1953 (tracks 9–12 & 14), at Radio Recorders in Hollywood on October 3, 1953 (tracks 6 & 8) and October 27, 1953 (track 13), at Capitol Studios in Hollywood on February 15, 1954 (tracks 1, 2, 4, 5 & 7) and in New York City on December 9, 1957 (track 3)

== Personnel ==
- Chet Baker – trumpet, vocals
- Jimmy Giuffre – clarinet (track 5)
- Bill Perkins – tenor saxophone (tracks 1, 2, 4 & 7)
- Russ Freeman – piano (tracks 1, 2 & 4–14)
- Dave Wheat – guitar (track 3)
- Joe Mondragon (track 13), Russ Saunders (track 3), Carson Smith (tracks 1, 2, 4–8, 10–12 & 14), Bob Whitlock (track 9) – bass
- Larry Bunker (tracks 6, 8, 10–12 & 14), Shelly Manne (track 13), Bob Neal (tracks 1, 2, 4, 5 & 7), Bobby White (track 9) – drums
