= Quartet: Russ Freeman/Chet Baker =

Studio album by Russ Freeman and Chet Baker
- Released: 1957
- Recorded: November 6, 1956; Los Angeles, California
- Genre: Jazz
- Length: 41:26
- Label: Pacific Jazz; PJ 1232
- Producer: Richard Bock

Chet Baker chronology
| Playboys (1956) | Quartet: Russ Freeman/Chet Baker (1957) | Theme Music from "The James Dean Story" (1956) |

Quartet: Russ Freeman/Chet Baker is an album by pianist Russ Freeman and trumpeter Chet Baker recorded in 1956 and released on the Pacific Jazz label early the following year.

== Reception ==
Professional ratings
Review scores
| Source | Rating |
|---|---|
| Allmusic | 3/5 stars |

Scott Yanow of Allmusic states, "Baker, who improvises on the date with a fair amount of fire while sticking to his middle register, emerges as the key soloist although Freeman sounds quite original within the genre".

== Track listing ==
All compositions by Russ Freeman except as indicated

1. "Love Nest" (Otto Harbach, Louis A. Hirsch) - 4:19
2. "Fan Tan" - 5:42
3. "Summer Sketch" - 4:37
4. "An Afternoon at Home" - 5:13
5. "Say When" - 5:02
6. "Lush Life" (Billy Strayhorn) - 4:55
7. "Amblin'" - 7:13
8. "Hugo Hurwhey" - 4:25

== Personnel ==
- Chet Baker - trumpet
- Russ Freeman - piano
- Leroy Vinnegar - bass
- Shelly Manne - drums
