= The Battle of Birdland =

Live album by Sonny Stitt and Eddie Davis
- Released: 1955
- Recorded: 1954
- Venue: Birdland, New York City
- Genre: Jazz
- Label: Roost; RLP/RST 1203

Sonny Stitt chronology
Jazz at the Hi-Hat (1954)	The Battle of Birdland (1955)	Sonny Stitt Plays Arrangements from the Pen of Quincy Jones (1955)

Eddie Davis chronology
Eddie Davis Trio (1953)	The Battle of Birdland (1954)	Modern Jazz by Eddie Davis (1955)

The Battle of Birdland (also released as Tenor Battle at Birdland and Jaws N' Stitt at Birdland) is a live album by saxophonists Sonny Stitt and Eddie Davis recorded at Birdland in New York City in 1954 and originally released on the Roost label.

== Reception ==
Professional ratings
Review scores
Source	Rating
Allmusic	3/5 stars

Scott Yanow, in his review for Allmusic, calls the album "a spirited and typically competitive jam session". The All About Jazz review stated "both tenormen were in the prime of their great careers at this stage and the music is wonderful... this recording is a particularily [sic] rare and memorable item indeed".

== Track listing ==
All compositions by Sonny Stitt except as indicated

1. "Jaws" (Eddie Davis) – 9:55
2. "I Can't Get Started" (Ira Gershwin, Vernon Duke) – 7:21
3. "Marchin'" – 8:45
4. "S.O.S." – 7:50
5. "Whoops!" 8:17 additional track on CD release
6. "All the Things You Are" (Oscar Hammerstein II, Jerome Kern) – 8:23 additional track on CD release
7. "Rollercoaster" – 9:06 additional track on CD release
8. "Don't Blame Me" (Dorothy Fields, Jimmy McHugh) – 7:51 additional track on CD release

== Personnel ==
- Eddie Davis, Sonny Stitt – tenor saxophone
- Harry "Doc" Bagby – organ
- Charlie Rice – drums
