= Chet Baker & Crew =

Studio album by Chet Baker
- Released: February 1957
- Recorded: July 24–25 & 31, 1956; Forum Theater, Los Angeles
- Genre: Jazz
- Length: 63:12; CD reissue with bonus tracks
- Label: Pacific Jazz; PJ 1224
- Producer: Richard Bock

Chet Baker chronology
The Route (1956)	Chet Baker & Crew (1957)	Chet Baker Big Band (1956)

Chet Baker & Crew is an album by jazz trumpeter Chet Baker which was recorded in Los Angeles in 1956 and released on the Pacific Jazz label.

== Reception ==
Professional ratings
Review scores
Source	Rating
AllMusic	4/5 stars
Disc	5/5 stars

An AllMusic review by Lindsay Planer states, "The numbers heard on Chet Baker & Crew were among a prolific flurry of recordings Baker was involved in during the last week of July 1956 — fresh from an extended European stay".

== Track listing ==
1. "To Mickey's Memory" (Harvey Leonard) - 5:12
2. "Slightly Above Moderate" (Bob Zieff) - 6:59
3. "Halema" (Phil Urso) - 3:51
4. "Revelation" (Gerry Mulligan) - 3:58
5. "Something For Liza" (Al Cohn) - 4:05
6. "Lucius Lu" (Urso) - 5:34
7. "Worryin' the Life Out of Me" (Miff Mole, Bob Russell, Frank Signorelli) - 2:59
8. "Medium Rock" (Zieff) - 5:30
9. "To Mickey's Memory" [Alternate Take] (Leonard) - 5:25 Bonus track on CD reissue
10. "Jumpin' Off a Clef" (Al Haig) - 4:55 Bonus track on CD reissue
11. "Chippyin'" (Leonard) - 3:20 Bonus track on CD reissue
12. "Pawnee Junction" (Bill Loughborough) - 4:01 Bonus track on CD reissue
13. "Music to Dance By" (Cohn) - 4:35 Bonus track on CD reissue
14. "Line for Lyons" (Mulligan, Loughbrough) - 2:48 Bonus track on CD reissue
- Recorded without an audience at the Forum Theatre in Los Angeles, California on July 24, 1956 (tracks 9–11), July 25, 1956 (tracks 12–14) and July 31, 1956 (tracks 1–8) - 7 more tracks including individual features can be found on the Young Chet CD or the Complete at the Forum Theatre 2-CD set

== Personnel ==
- Chet Baker - trumpet, vocal on track 14
- Phil Urso - tenor saxophone
- Bobby Timmons - piano
- Jimmy Bond - bass
- Peter Littmann - drums
- Bill Loughborough - chromatic timpani (tracks 1, 9 & 12)
