= Besame Mucho (album) =

Live album by Art Pepper
- Released: 1981
- Recorded: July 16 & 23, 1979
- Venues: Shiba Yūbin Chokin Hall, Minato, Tokyo
- Genre: Jazz
- Length: 46:52
- Labels: JVC; VIJ-6372
- Producers: Akira Taguchi and Hiroshi Aono

Art Pepper chronology
Landscape (1979)	Besame Mucho (1981)	Straight Life (1979)

Besame Mucho is a live album by saxophonist Art Pepper recorded in Japan in 1979 at the same concerts that produced Landscape and originally released on the Japanese JVC label in 1981 before being rereleased on the Galaxy label.

== Reception ==
Professional ratings
Review scores
Source	Rating
AllMusic	4/5 stars

The AllMusic review by Thom Jurek noted "Only the ballad is on the short side, and the rest give Pepper the opportunity to really stretch himself and interact with Cables, whose fluid scalar approach to soloing, while invoking bop's precision balanced by an abundant lyrical swing, was a perfect vehicle for the saxophonist's intense melodic improvising. This is a welcome addition to the U.S. catalog for fans and a fantastic introduction to Pepper's many gifts for the uninitiated."

== Track listing ==
All compositions by Art Pepper except where noted.

1. "Red Car" – 9:14
2. "The Shadow of Your Smile" (Johnny Mandel, Paul Francis Webster) – 6:29
3. "The Trip" – 10:01
4. "Mambo de la Pinta" – 11:57
5. "Bésame Mucho" (Consuelo Velázquez, Sunny Skylar) – 9:11

== Personnel ==
- Art Pepper – alto saxophone
- George Cables – piano
- Tony Dumas – electric upright bass (credited as "blitz bass")
- Billy Higgins – drums
