= Jerry Gladstone =

American chief executive

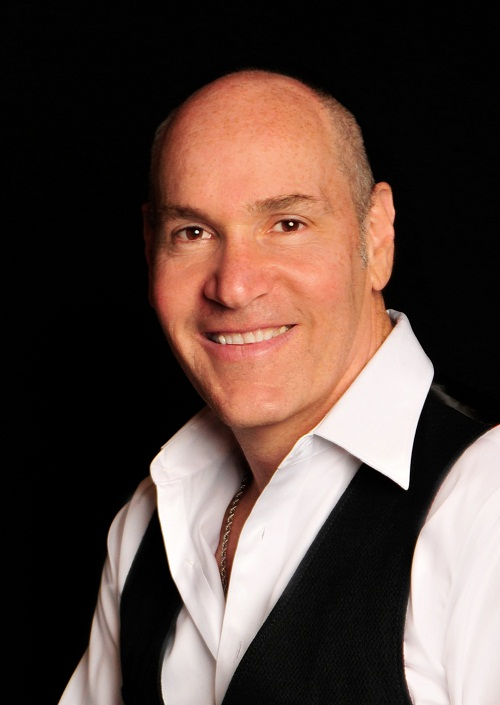
- Born: March 11, 1960 (age 66); Brooklyn, New York
- Occupation: Marketing Executive
- Known for: Best-Selling Author
- Spouse: Brooke Gladstone
- Children: 3
- Website: thecommonthreadgroup.com

Jerry Gladstone (born March 11, 1960) is an author, personal life coach and marketing executive. During his 25-year career, Gladstone specialized in the production and distribution of entertainment fine art for major movie studios and celebrities. Gladstone is the founder of The Common Thread Success Academy, The Common Thread Group and author of the International Best-Selling Book, The Common Thread of Overcoming Adversity and Living Your Dreams. The Common Thread includes inspiring stories and insights about overcoming adversity provided by Academy Award and Grammy winners, Super Bowl champions, music icons, Olympians, UFC champions, and billionaires.

In 2020, Gladstone came out with his latest book, Old School Success for the Millennial Generation & Beyond: Wisdom from the Past for Your Best Future. In this book, Gladstone goes against the so-called experts who say Millennials are lazy and entitled and have labeled them as “Generation Me”. The book offers old school wisdom to the new generation. Published by New York publisher, Morgan James Publishing, the book has met with rave reviews and had received endorsements from many high-profile celebrities.

Gladstone is a life and success coach certified by The International Coach Federation (ICF).

== Early life ==
Jerry Gladstone was born in Brooklyn, New York, and raised with his two older sisters, Marla and Bonnie, in Massapequa Park, Long Island, New York, by his parents Martin and Estelle. Gladstone excelled in sports earning a black belt in Karate. He also has competed in many marathons and triathlons. Gladstone attended the University of Rhode Island (URI) on a scholarship for football. He graduated from URI with a Bachelor of Science.

He began his first venture with an initial capital investment of $2,000. Under Gladstone's leadership, the company was awarded licensing agreements for both the publication of art and distribution. Licenses have included Walt Disney Animation Studios, Fox Studios, Warner Bros., DreamWorks SKG, Apple Corps, Jim Davis’ Garfield and others.

Gladstone also entered into an agreement with Mel Fisher, the American treasure hunter. The agreement allowed Gladstone to offer for sale to the public Fisher's personal collection of treasure recovered from the Atocha, a treasure ship which sank in 1621. The Atocha discovery included rare gold doubloons, silver bars, jewelry and emeralds.

== Career ==
Through the years, Gladstone licensed works from famous celebrities, artists, photographers and musicians including Elvis Presley Enterprises, Frank Sinatra Enterprises, entertainment and pop culture artist Joe Petruccio, The Paradise Collection of Dan Mackin, legendary musician Brian Wilson, Jefferson Airplane's Marty Balin, The Beatles portfolios from The Hulton Archives of London and Mirrorpix, the Led Zeppelin Collection from James Fortune, The Grateful Dead, Bob Marley, Archives of Peter Simon, and the new Michael Ochs Collections' classic rock and jazz.

Gladstone has been the subject of numerous articles in business and trade newspapers and magazines. Both USA Today and CNBC have featured Jerry as an industry authority in the field of collecting entertainment fine art. His positive attitude and success was featured in the book, “Attitude is Everything,” by motivational speaker and author Jeffrey Keller.

Some of the entertainment fine art offered by Gladstone and his companies were "The Scottsdale Collection," art and memorabilia signed by Muhammad Ali during a witnessed in-person signing, as well as artwork signed by Tiger Woods and Michael Jordan through Upper Deck Authenticated. Through a license agreement with MGM Studios, he also offered personalized artwork from Sylvester Stallone celebrating the 30th anniversary of Rocky.

Al Pacino was also secured for an in-person signing by Gladstone for Joe Petruccio artwork featuring images from The Godfather and Scarface.

== Other Ventures ==
In 1999, Getty Images, successfully purchased the business owned by Gladstone. Two years later, Getty decided to take a different business path, and Gladstone reacquired the company in the first quarter of 2002. In 2002, Gladstone relocated the corporate headquarters from New York City to Boca Raton, Florida. In 2010, Gladstone started a new business venture in Delray Beach, Florida, also specializing in the licensing, production and distribution of entertainment fine art with a focus on licensed limited edition art and photography from both the music and entertainment industries.

Under license, Gladstone produces Mixed Martial Arts fine art photography created from sports and celebrity artist Eric Williams. UFC fighters that have done signings with Gladstone include Anderson "The Spider" Silva, Georges St-Pierre, Wanderlei Silva, Forrest Griffin, Chuck "The Iceman" Liddell and Randy "The Natural" Couture.

Gladstone hosted the first Mixed Martial Arts Expo in South Florida in 2012 with UFC legend Randy Couture as the featured guest.

== Personal life ==
Jerry Gladstone is married to Brooke Gladstone. Together they have 3 children.
