= Mucho Calor =

Studio album by Conte Candoli and Art Pepper
- Released: 1957
- Recorded: October 3, 1957; Forum Theatre, Los Angeles, CA
- Genre: Jazz
- Label: Andex; A 3002

Conte Candoli chronology
| Conte Candoli Quartet (1957) | Mucho Calor (1957) | Little Band Big Jazz (1960) |

Art Pepper chronology
| Art Pepper Meets the Rhythm Section (1957) | Mucho Calor (1957) | Art Pepper + Eleven - Modern Jazz Classics (1959) |

Mucho Calor (subtitled A Presentation in Latin Jazz) is an album by trumpeter Conte Candoli and alto saxophonist Art Pepper in an octet with tenor saxophonist Bill Perkins, pianist Russ Freeman, bassist Ben Tucker, drummer Chuck Flores and percussionists Jack Costanzo and Mike Pacheko recorded in 1957 and originally released on the Andex label.

== Reception ==
Professional ratings
Review scores
| Source | Rating |
|---|---|
| AllMusic | 4/5 stars |

The AllMusic review by Scott Yanow noted: "the music is quite jazz-oriented if a touch lightweight. Worth investigating by fans of the idiom".

== Track listing ==
1. "Mucho Calor" (Bill Holman) - 6:53
2. "Autumn Leaves" (Joseph Kosma, Jacques Prévert) - 3:05
3. "Mambo de la Pinta" (Art Pepper) - 5:29
4. "I'll Remember April" (Gene de Paul, Don Raye) - 2:21
5. "Vaya Hombre Vaya" (Holman) - 3:21
6. "I Love You" (Cole Porter) - 5:47
7. "Mambo Jumbo" (Conte Candoli) - 3:47
8. "Old Devil Moon" (Burton Lane, Yip Harburg) - 5:27
9. "Pernod" (Johnny Mandel) - 3:57
10. "That Old Black Magic" (Harold Arlen, Johnny Mercer) - 4:25

== Personnel ==
- Conte Candoli - trumpet, arranger (track 7)
- Art Pepper - alto saxophone, arranger (tracks 3, 4,
- Bill Perkins - tenor saxophone
- Russ Freeman - piano
- Ben Tucker - bass
- Chuck Flores - drums
- Jack Costanzo and Mike Pacheko - bongos, congas
- Benny Carter (track 2), Bill Holman (tracks 1, 5, 6, 8 & 10), Johnny Mandel (track 9) - arranger
