= Jazz at the Hi-Hat =

Live album by Sonny Stitt
- Released: 1955
- Recorded: February 11, 1954
- Venue: The Hi-Hat, Boston, Massachusetts
- Genre: Jazz
- Label: Roost; RLP 418
- Producer: Teddy Reig

Sonny Stitt chronology
Kaleidoscope (1950-52)	Jazz at the Hi-Hat (1955)	The Battle of Birdland (1954)

Professional ratings
Review scores
Source	Rating
Allmusic	4/5 stars

Jazz at the Hi-Hat is a live album by saxophonist Sonny Stitt recorded in Boston in 1954 and originally released on the Roost label as a four track 10 inch LP. The original album has been expanded with additional material and released on CD in two volumes.

== Reception ==
The Allmusic review by Scott Yanow states, "this CD gives one a good all-around sampling of early Sonny Stitt".

== Track listing ==
All compositions by Sonny Stitt except as indicated

Volume 1:

1. "Blue and Sentimental" (Count Basie, Mack David, Jerry Livingston) – 3:08
2. "Thou Swell" (Lorenz Hart, Richard Rodgers)
3. "Every Tub" (Basie, Eddie Durham)
4. "Pennies from Heaven" (Johnny Burke, Arthur Johnston)
5. "Sweet Georgia Brown" (Ben Bernie, Kenneth Casey, Maceo Pinkard) – 5:00 additional track on CD release
6. "I'm in the Mood for Love" (Dorothy Fields, Jimmy McHugh) – 4:43 additional track on CD release
7. "Tri–Horn Blues" additional track on CD release
8. "If I Should Lose You" (Ralph Rainger, Leo Robin) – 4:43 additional track on CD release
9. "(Back Home Again In) Indiana" (James F. Hanley, Ballard MacDonald) – 5:04 additional track on CD release
10. "Wigwam" – 2:53 additional track on CD release
11. "My Melancholy Baby" (Ernie Burnett, George Norton) additional track on CD release
12. "Flying Home" (Benny Goodman, Lionel Hampton, Sydney Robin) – 3:14 additional track on CD release

Volume 2:

1. "S.O.S. (Columbus Avenue Rhythm)" – 8:06
2. "Rockin' at the Hi-Hat" – 2:23
3. "(Back Home Again In) Indiana" (Hanley, MacDonald) – 3:14
4. "They Can't Take That Away from Me" (George Gershwin, Ira Gershwin) – 4:24
5. "Lover" (Hart, Rodgers) – 3:04
6. "Flying Home" (Goodman, Hampton, Robin) – 2:55
7. "Mass Ave. Swing" – 2:29
8. "They Say It's Wonderful" (Irving Berlin) – 2:10
9. "One O'Clock Jump" (Basie, Durham) – 12:22
10. "Jeepers Creepers" (Johnny Mercer, Harry Warren) – 4:16
11. "Baritone Blues" – 4:01
12. "How High the Moon" (Nancy Hamilton, Morgan Lewis) – 6:10
13. "Body and Soul" (Frank Eyton, Johnny Green, Edward Heyman, Robert Sour) – 3:53
14. "If I Had You" (Jimmy Campbell, Reg Connelly, Ted Shapiro) – 1:59
15. "Jumpin' with Symphony Sid" (Lester Young) – 2:42

== Personnel ==
- Sonny Stitt – alto saxophone, tenor saxophone, baritone saxophone
- Dean Earl – piano
- Bernie Griggs – bass
- Marquis Foster – drums
