= I Wish I Knew How It Would Feel to Be Free (album) =

Live album by Billy Taylor Trio
- Released: 1968
- Recorded: 1967
- Genre: Jazz
- Length: 42:57
- Label: Tower; ST 5111
- Producer: Billy Taylor

Billy Taylor chronology
Midnight Piano (1964)	I Wish I Knew How It Would Feel to Be Free (1968)	Sleeping Bee (1969)

I Wish I Knew How It Would Feel to Be Free is a live album by American jazz pianist Billy Taylor, which was originally released on the Tower label in 1968.

== Reception ==
Professional ratings
Review scores
Source	Rating
Allmusic	4/5 stars

Allmusic awarded the album 4 stars, calling it "a good all-round showcase of Billy Taylor's playing".

== Track listing ==
1. "Pensativa" (Clare Fischer) - 8:11
2. "I Wish I Knew How It Would Feel to Be Free" (Billy Taylor, Dick Dallas) - 4:25
3. "Morning" (Fischer) - 5:23
4. "T.N.T." (Ben Tucker, Grady Tate) - 4:27
5. "Hard to Find" (Leroy Vinnegar) - 4:08
6. "Lonesome Lover" (Teddy Castion) - 3:32
7. "Sunny" (Bobby Hebb) - 4:22
8. "Cag" (Taylor) - 4:22

== Personnel ==
- Billy Taylor - piano
- Ben Tucker - bass
- Grady Tate - drums
