= San Francisco Samba =

Live album by Art Pepper
- Released: 1997
- Recorded: August 6 & 8, 1977; Keystone Korner, San Francisco, CA
- Genre: Jazz
- Length: 50:32
- Label: Contemporary C 14086
- Producer: Todd Barkan

Art Pepper chronology
More for Les at the Village Vanguard (1977)	San Francisco Samba (1997)	Among Friends (1978)

San Francisco Samba (subtitled Live at Keystone Korner) is a live album by saxophonist Art Pepper, recorded at the Keystone Korner in 1977 and released on the Contemporary label in 1997.

== Reception ==
Professional ratings
Review scores
Source	Rating
AllMusic	4/5 stars
The Penguin Guide to Jazz Recordings	3.5/4 stars

The AllMusic review by Cub Koda states: " Pepper may have been a tortured soul in his last half-decade, but he let all of his emotions come out through his horn. And his music was never more direct, honest and beautiful as a result of it". In JazzTimes, Harvey Pekar was less complimentary, stating, "The CD consists of four long tracks, and on it Art's playing leaves plenty to be desired. He plays with plenty of heat, but doesn't connect his phrases or build, wandering all over the place, and doesn't display much imagination either. It's a shame because the rhythm section cooks like crazy."

== Track listing ==
All compositions by Art Pepper except as indicated

1. "Blue Bossa" (Kenny Dorham) - 16:15
2. "Art Meets Mr. Beautiful" - 12:10
3. "Here's That Rainy Day" (Jimmy Van Heusen, Johnny Burke) - 11:35
4. "Samba Mom Mom" - 11:27

== Personnel ==
- Art Pepper - alto saxophone
- George Cables - piano
- Michael Formanek - bass
- Eddie Marshall - drums
