= Walking shoes =

Walking shoes may refer to:

== Footwear ==
- Sneakers, shoes primarily designed for sports but widely used for everyday wear.
- Hiking boots, designed for protecting the feet and ankles during outdoor walking activities.

== Music ==
- "Walkin' Shoes", a jazz composition by Gerry Mulligan from 1952.
- "Walking Shoes", a country-music song written by Paul Kennerley from 1990.
