= One September Afternoon =

Studio album by Art Pepper
- Released: 1981
- Recorded: September 5, 1980
- Genre: Jazz
- Label: Galaxy
- Producer: Ed Michel

Art Pepper chronology
| Winter Moon (1980) | One September Afternoon (1981) | Art Pepper with Duke Jordan in Copenhagen 1981 (1981) |

Professional ratings
Review scores
| Source | Rating |
|---|---|
| AllMusic | 3/5 stars |
| The Penguin Guide to Jazz Recordings | 3/4 stars |
| The Rolling Stone Jazz Record Guide | 2/5 stars |

One September Afternoon is a 1981 jazz album by saxophonist Art Pepper, playing with Stanley Cowell, Howard Roberts, Cecil McBee and Carl Burnett.

The personnel is the same as on Pepper's previous album, Winter Moon, but without the strings.

== Track listing ==
1. "Mr. Big Falls His J.G. Hand" (Art Pepper) – 6:09
2. "Close to You Alone" (Cecil McBee) – 6:43
3. "There Will Never Be Another You" (Harry Warren, Mack Gordon) – 6:09
4. "Melolev" (Art Pepper) – 5:27
5. "Goodbye, Again!" (Stanley Cowell) – 6:23
6. "Brazil" (Ary Barroso) – 8:30

== Personnel ==
- Art Pepper – alto saxophone
- Stanley Cowell – piano
- Howard Roberts – guitar (on "Mr. Big" and "Brazil" only)
- Cecil McBee – bass
- Carl Burnett – drums

Stanley Cowell does not play on "Brazil"; Howard Roberts adds a second guitar part.

== Sources ==
- Richard Cook & Brian Morton. The Penguin Guide to Jazz on CD. Penguin, 4th edition, 1998. ISBN 0-14-051383-3
