= Baby Breeze =

Studio album by Chet Baker
- Released: 1965
- Recorded: November 14 & 20, 1964
- Studios: A&R Studios, NYC
- Genre: Jazz
- Length: 54:56 CD release with bonus tracks
- Labels: Limelight; LM 82003/LS 86003
- Producer: Bobby Scott

Chet Baker chronology
The Most Important Jazz Album of 1964/65 (1964)	Baby Breeze (1965)	Stella by Starlight (1964)

Baby Breeze is an album by trumpeter/vocalist Chet Baker which was recorded in 1964 and released on the Limelight label.

== Reception ==
Professional ratings
Review scores
Source	Rating
Allmusic	4/5 stars
The Penguin Guide to Jazz Recordings	3/4 stars

The Allmusic review by Ken Dryden states: "Although Chet Baker's recordings from late in his life varied dramatically in quality, this series of studio sessions is a high point in his career. After having his trumpet stolen, he plays beautifully with a borrowed flügelhorn throughout most of these songs with a powerful tone".

== Track listing ==
1. "Baby Breeze" (Richard Carpenter) – 3:06
2. "Born to Be Blue" (Mel Tormé, Robert Wells) – 4:03
3. "This Is the Thing" (Hal Galper) – 4:51
4. "I Wish You Love" (Charles Trénet, Albert Beach) – 3:09
5. "Everything Depends on You" (Earl Hines, Charles Carpenter, Louis Dunlap) – 3:21
6. "One with One" (Galper) – 3:42
7. "Pamela's Passion" (Galper) – 5:19
8. "The Touch of Your Lips" (Ray Noble) – 2:39
9. "Comin' Down" (Richard Carpenter) – 4:25
10. "You're Mine, You" (Johnny Green, Edward Heyman) – 3:08
11. "Sweet Sue, Just You" (Victor Young, Will J. Harris) – 2:16 Bonus track on CD release
12. "A Taste of Honey" (Bobby Scott, Ric Marlow) – 2:57 Bonus track on CD release
13. "Think Beautiful" (Stan Freeman, Jack Lawrence) – 4:18 Bonus track on CD release
14. "I Wish You Love" [alternate take] (Trénet, Beach) – 3:24 Bonus track on CD release
15. "Think Beautiful" [alternate take] (Freeman, Lawrence) – 4:18 Bonus track on CD release
- Recorded at A&R Studios in NYC on November 14, 1964 (tracks 1, 3, 6, 7, 9–12 & 14), November 20, 1964 (tracks 2, 4, 5, 8, 13 & 15)

== Personnel ==
- Chet Baker – flugelhorn, vocals
- Frank Strozier – alto saxophone, flute (tracks 1, 3, 6, 7 & 9)
- Phil Urso – tenor saxophone, arranger (tracks 1, 3, 6, 7 & 9)
- Hal Galper – piano, arranger (tracks 1, 3, 6, 7 & 9)
- Bob James – piano (tracks 4, 8 & 13–15)
- Bobby Scott – piano, arranger (tracks 2, 5 & 12)
- Kenny Burrell – guitar (tracks 2, 5, 10 & 11)
- Michael Fleming – bass (tracks 1, 3, 4, 6–9 & 13–15)
- Charlie Rice – drums (tracks 1, 3, 4, 6–9 & 13–15)
