= New York Album =

Studio album by Art Pepper
- Released: 1985
- Recorded: February 23 and May 26, 1979
- Studio: Sound Ideas Studios, NYC and Kendun Recorders, Burbank, CA
- Genre: Jazz
- Length: 39:15
- Label: Galaxy; GXY 5154
- Producer: John Snyder and Laurie Pepper

Art Pepper chronology
| Art Pepper Today (1978) | New York Album (1985) | So in Love (1979) |

New York Album is an album by saxophonist Art Pepper recorded in 1979 at the sessions that produced So in Love but not released on the Galaxy label until 1985.

== Reception ==
Professional ratings
Review scores
| Source | Rating |
|---|---|
| AllMusic | 3/5 stars |

The AllMusic review by Ron Wynne calls it a "fine date".

== Track listing ==
All compositions by Art Pepper except where noted.

1. "A Night in Tunisia" (Dizzy Gillespie, Frank Paparelli) - 9:43
2. "Lover Man" (Jimmy Davis, Ram Ramirez, Jimmy Sherman) - 5:50
3. "Straight, No Chaser" [alternate take] (Thelonious Monk) - 6:00
4. "Duo Blues" - 7:55
5. "My Friend John" - 9:47
- Recorded at Sound Ideas Studios, NYC on February 23, 1979 (tracks 1 & 3–5) and at Kendun Recorders, Burbank, CA on May 26, 1979 (track 2)

== Personnel ==
- Art Pepper - alto saxophone
- Hank Jones - piano (tracks 1, 3 & 5)
- Ron Carter - bass (tracks 1 & 3–5)
- Al Foster - drums (tracks 1, 3 & 5)
