= Ben Tucker =

American double-bassist (1930–2013)

- Born: Benjamin M. Tucker; December 13, 1930; Nashville, Tennessee, U.S.
- Died: June 4, 2013 (aged 82) Hutchinson Island, Georgia, U.S.
- Genres: Jazz
- Occupations: Musician; businessman; composer
- Instruments: Bass; tuba

Benjamin M. Tucker (December 13, 1930 – June 4, 2013) was an American jazz bassist who appeared on hundreds of recordings. Tucker played on albums by Art Pepper, Billy Taylor, Quincy Jones, Grant Green, Dexter Gordon, Hank Crawford, Junior Mance, and Herbie Mann.

He was born in Tennessee. As bass player in the Dave Bailey Quintet in 1961, he wrote the instrumental version of the song "Comin' Home Baby!", first issued on the album Two Feet in the Gutter. Bob Dorough later wrote a lyric to the song, and the vocal version became a Top 40 hit for jazz singer Mel Tormé in 1962.

Tucker released the album Baby, You Should Know It (Ava, 1963) with Victor Feldman, Larry Bunker, Bobby Thomas, Ray Crawford, Tommy Tedesco, and Carlos "Patato" Valdes.

By 1972, Tucker owned two radio stations, WSOK-AM, which had over 400,000 listeners, and WLVH-FM. Both of these were located in his hometown of Savannah, Georgia. During the 1990s he owned a jazz bar in Savannah called Hard Hearted Hannah's.

He died in a traffic collision in Hutchinson Island, Georgia, on June 4, 2013.

== Discography ==
=== Leader ===
- Sweet Thunder (BenGlo Records (US)|BenGlo Music, 2009)
- Baby, You Should Know It (Ava records (US), 1963)

=== Sideman ===
With Mose Allison

- The Word from Mose (Atlantic, 1964)

With Harry Babasin

- Harry Babasin and The Jazz Pickers (Mode Records, 1957)

With Dave Bailey

- Reaching Out (Jazztime, 1961)
- Bash! (Jazzline, 1961)
- 2 Feet in the Gutter (Epic, 1961)

With Kenny Burrell

- On View at the Five Spot Cafe (Blue Note, 1959)
- Freedom (Blue Note, 1964 [1980])
- Swingin' (Blue Note, 1956 [rel. 1980])

With Chris Connor

- Free Spirits (Atlantic, 1962)

With Ray Crawford

- I Know Press (Candid, 1971)

With Eddie "Lockjaw" Davis

- Love Calls (RCA Victor, 1968)

With Lou Donaldson

- Gravy Train (Blue Note, 1961)
- Midnight Sun (Blue Note, 1980)

With Kenny Dorham

- Hot Stuff From Brazil (West Wind, 1961)

With Bob Dorough

- An Excursion Through Oliver! (Music Minus One, 1963)
- Just About Everything (Focus, 1966)

With Teddy Edwards

- Sunset Eyes (Pacific Jazz, 1960)
- It's All Right! (Prestige, 1967)

With Gil Evans

- The Individualism of Gil Evans (Verve, 1964)

With Tommy Flanagan

- Trio And Sextet (Onyx, 1973)

With Dexter Gordon

- Clubhouse (Blue Note, 1965 [1979])

With Grant Green

- Green Street (Blue Note, 1961)
- Sunday Mornin' (Blue Note, 1961)
- Grantstand (Blue Note, 1961)

With Chico Hamilton

- Chico Hamilton Trio Introducing Freddie Gambrell (World Pacific, 1958)

With Roland Hanna

- Easy to Love (ATCO, 1960)

With Willis Jackson

- Gator's Groove (Prestige, 1969)

With Illinois Jacquet

- The Message (Prestige, 1963)
- Bottoms Up (Prestige, 1968)

With Quincy Jones

- Quincy's Got a Brand New Bag (Mercury, 1965)

With Clifford Jordan

- Soul Fountain (Vortex, 1966 [1970])

With Yusef Lateef

- The Centaur and the Phoenix (Riverside, 1960)

With Junior Mance

- The Soulful Piano of Junior Mance (Jazzland, 1960)

With Herbie Mann

- Herbie Mann at the Village Gate (Atlantic, 1961)
- Herbie Mann Live at Newport (Atlantic, 1963)
- Standing Ovation at Newport (Atlantic, 1965)

With Warne Marsh

- Jazz of Two Cities (Imperial, 1956)

With Pat Martino

- Strings! (Prestige, 1967)
- East! (Prestige, 1968)

With James Moody

- The Blues and Other Colors (Milestone, 1969)

With Gerry Mulligan

- Jeru (Columbia, 1962)

With Mark Murphy

- That's How I Love the Blues! (Riverside, 1963)

With Oliver Nelson

- Fantabulous (Argo, 1964)

With Art Pepper

- The Art Pepper Quartet (Tampa, 1956)
- Art Pepper with Warne Marsh (Contemporary, 1956 [1986]) with Warne Marsh
- Collections (Intro, 1957) with Red Norvo, Joe Morello and Gerry Wiggins
- Modern Art (Intro, 1957)
- Mucho Calor (Andex, 1957) with Conte Candoli

With Lalo Schifrin

- Samba Para Dos (Verve, 1963) with Bob Brookmeyer

With Bola Sete

- Bossa Nova (Fantasy, 1962)

With Jimmy Smith

- Got My Mojo Workin' (Verve, 1966)

With Jeremy Steig

- Flute Fever (Columbia, 1964)

With Sonny Stitt

- Sax Expressions (Roost, 1965)

With Billy Taylor

- I Wish I Knew How It Would Feel to Be Free (Tower, 1968)
- Sleeping Bee (MPS, 1969)

With Harold Vick

- Commitment (Muse, 1967 [1974])
