= Sleeping Bee =

Studio album by Billy Taylor Trio
- Released: 1969
- Recorded: April 1969
- Studio: RCA Studio, New York City
- Genre: Jazz
- Length: 42:57
- Label: MPS; MPS 15234; Prestige; PR 7762
- Producer: Hans Georg Brunner-Schwer

Billy Taylor chronology
I Wish I Knew How It Would Feel to Be Free (1968)	Sleeping Bee (1969)	OK Billy (1970)

Billy Taylor Today cover

Sleeping Bee is an album by American jazz pianist Billy Taylor which was recorded in 1969 and originally released on the MPS label in Europe and re-released on the Prestige label in the US as Billy Taylor Today.

== Reception ==
Professional ratings
Review scores
Source	Rating
Allmusic	4/5 stars

Allmusic awarded the album 4 stars stating "The enjoyable music swings and fits perfectly into the jazz mainstream of the era".

== Track listing ==
All compositions by Billy Taylor except as indicated

1. "La Petite Mambo" (Erroll Garner) - 4:47
2. "Theodora" - 5:43
3. "Paraphrase" - 4:21
4. "Bye Y'all" - 5:13
5. "Don't Go Down South" - 3:28
6. "Brother, Where Are You?" (Oscar Brown) - 5:33
7. "There Will Never Be Another You" (Harry Warren, Mack Gordon) - 8:24
8. "A Sleepin' Bee" (Harold Arlen, Truman Capote) - 5:28

== Personnel ==
- Billy Taylor – piano
- Ben Tucker – bass
- Grady Tate – drums
