= Playboys (Chet Baker and Art Pepper album) =

Studio album by Chet Baker and Art Pepper
- Released: 1956
- Recorded: October 31, 1956
- Studio: Radio Recorders, Hollywood, California
- Genre: Jazz
- Length: 40:07
- Label: Pacific Jazz; PJ 1234
- Producer: Richard Bock

Chet Baker chronology
| Chet Baker Big Band (1956) | Playboys (1956) | Quartet: Russ Freeman/Chet Baker (1956) |

Art Pepper chronology
| The Return of Art Pepper (1956) | Playboys (1956) | The Art Pepper Quartet (1956) |

Picture of Heath cover

Playboys is a 1956 jazz album featuring trumpeter Chet Baker and saxophonist Art Pepper. The album was the third collaboration between Pepper and Baker, following The Route and Chet Baker Big Band. All three albums were recorded in 1956.

== Cover ==
Playboys was reissued in 1961 under the name Picture of Heath after the fifth track (itself a reference to Jimmy Heath, composer of all but two of the tracks). The tracks themselves were presented in a slightly different order, starting with the new title track. Hugh Hefner reportedly objected to the original album cover (clearly inspired by Playboy magazine with its near-identical wordmark and pinup photo) and threatened to sue. For Picture of Heath, the original cover was replaced with a photo of the artists in the recording studio. The 1990 Blue Note/Pacific Jazz CD reissue of Playboys used the 'pin-up' cover, but the same label's 1998 CD reissue returned to the Picture of Heath cover.

== Reception ==
Professional ratings
Review scores
| Source | Rating |
|---|---|
| AllMusic | 4/5 stars |
| The Penguin Guide to Jazz Recordings | 3/4 stars |

Lindsay Planer of AllMusic stated: "These thoroughly enjoyable and often high-energy sides are perfect for bop connoisseurs as well as mainstream jazz listeners".

== Track listing ==
All compositions by Jimmy Heath, except as indicated

1. "For Minors Only" - 4:00
2. "Minor-Yours " (Art Pepper) - 6:44
3. "Resonant Emotions" - 5:41
4. "Tynan Tyme" (Pepper) - 5:32
5. "Picture of Heath" - 6:44
6. "For Miles and Miles" - 6:25
7. "C.T.A." - 5:12

1998 CD release

1. "Picture of Heath"
2. "For Miles and Miles "
3. "C.T.A. "
4. "For Minors Only"
5. "Minor Yours "
6. "Resonant Emotions"
7. "Tynan Tyme"

== Personnel ==
- Chet Baker — trumpet
- Art Pepper — alto saxophone
- Phil Urso — tenor saxophone
- Carl Perkins — piano
- Curtis Counce — bass
- Larance Marable — drums
