= Winter Moon (album) =

Studio album by Art Pepper
- Released: 1981
- Recorded: September 3 and 4, 1980, Fantasy, Berkley
- Genre: Jazz
- Label: Galaxy
- Producer: Ed Michel

Art Pepper chronology
Straight Life (1979)	Winter Moon (1981)	One September Afternoon (1980)

Professional ratings
Review scores
Source	Rating
The Penguin Guide to Jazz on CD	4/4 stars
The Rolling Stone Jazz Record Guide	3/5 stars

Winter Moon is a 1981 album by jazz saxophonist Art Pepper, playing with Stanley Cowell, Howard Roberts, Cecil McBee, Carl Burnett and with strings arranged and conducted by Bill Holman ("Our Song", "When the Sun Comes Out", "Blues in the Night", "Winter Moon") and Jimmy Bond ("Here's That Rainy Day", "That's Love", "The Prisoner").

== Track listing ==
1. "Our Song" (Art Pepper) – 5:29
2. "Here's That Rainy Day" (Jimmy Van Heusen; Johnny Burke) – 5:18
3. "That's Love" (Art Pepper) – 4:50
4. "Winter Moon" (Hoagy Carmichael) – 5:30
5. "When the Sun Comes Out" (Harold Arlen; Ted Koehler) – 5:47
6. "Blues in the Night" (Harold Arlen; Johnny Mercer) – 6:59
7. "The Prisoner (Love Theme from Eyes of Laura Mars)" (Lawrence; John Desautels) – 6:45

== Personnel ==
Musicians

- Art Pepper – alto saxophone; clarinet on "Blues in the Night"
- Stanley Cowell – piano
- Howard Roberts – guitar
- Cecil McBee – bass
- Carl Burnett – drums
- Nate Rubin – violin, concert master
- Mary Ann Meredith, Sharon O'Connor, Terry Adams – cello
- Audrey Desilva, Clifton Foster, Dan Smiley, Elizabeth Gibson, Emily Van Valkenburg, Greg Mazmanian, John Tenney, Patrice Anderson, Stephen Gehl – violin

Other personnel

- Bill Holman – arranger, conductor
- Jimmy Bond – arranger, conductor
- Phil Carroll – art director
- George Horn – mastering
- Galen Rowell – photography
- Ed Michel – producer
- Baker Bigsby, Wally Buck – recording
- Danny Kopelson – recording assistant
