= Smack Up =

Studio album by Art Pepper
- Released: 1960
- Recorded: 24–25 October 1960
- Genre: Jazz
- Length: 51:00
- Label: Contemporary/OJC
- Producer: Lester Koenig

Art Pepper chronology
Gettin' Together (1960)	Smack Up (1960)	Intensity (1960)

Professional ratings
Review scores
Source	Rating
DownBeat	4.5/5 stars
The Penguin Guide to Jazz Recordings	4/4 stars
The Rolling Stone Jazz Record Guide	4/5 stars

Smack Up is a 1960 jazz album by saxophonist Art Pepper playing with trumpeter Jack Sheldon, pianist Pete Jolly, bassist Jimmy Bond and drummer Frank Butler.

Leonard Feather's sleeve notes include two quotes by Pepper which throw light on his approach to playing jazz:

"Knowing the relationships of chords to one another, how they fit into sequences and how you build on them, all reminds you that there's an important relationship between mathematics and music."

"The way a man walks, the way he talks, the timbre of his voice, the cadences of his speech, his little variations in phrasing a thought — all have so much to do with individuality. The same thing is true of a man's playing in jazz... his tone, the way his sound moves, his feeling for time. That's why jazz is consistently fascinating. You could ask six guys to play an identical solo, but when you heard the results, you'd hear six different solos."

The album consists only of compositions written by saxophonists.

== Track listing ==
1. "Smack Up" (Harold Land) – 4:15
2. "Las Cuevas De Mario" (Art Pepper) – 6:59
3. "A Bit of Basie" (Buddy Collette) – 7:21
4. "How Can You Lose" (Benny Carter) – 6:53
5. "Maybe Next Year" (Duane Tatro) – 4:21
6. "Tears Inside" (Ornette Coleman) – 7:43

Bonus Tracks on Compact Disc version;
7. "Solid Citizens" (Jack Montrose) – 6:29
8. "Solid Citizens" (alternate take) – 6:28

(Recorded on 24–25 October 1960.)

== Personnel ==
- Art Pepper — alto saxophone
- Jack Sheldon — trumpet
- Pete Jolly — piano
- Jimmy Bond — bass
- Frank Butler — drums
