= No Limit (Art Pepper album) =

Studio album by Art Pepper
- Released: 1977
- Recorded: March 26, 1977
- Genre: Jazz
- Length: 38:00
- Label: Contemporary/OJC
- Producer: Lester Koenig, John Koenig

Art Pepper chronology
Tokyo Debut (1977)	No Limit (1977)	Thursday Night at the Village Vanguard (1977)

No Limit is a 1977 jazz album by saxophonist Art Pepper, playing with pianist George Cables, bassist Tony Dumas and drummer Carl Burnett.

As Pepper says in the sleeve notes, he considered this album to be a memento of his friendship with Lester Koenig, who died on November 21, 1977.

== Reception ==
Professional ratings
Review scores
Source	Rating
AllMusic	4.5/5 stars
The Penguin Guide to Jazz Recordings	2.5/4 stars
The Rolling Stone Jazz Record Guide	2/5 stars
DownBeat	4/5 stars

AllMusic reviewer Scott Yanow wrote that the album "has the emotional intensity and chance-taking improvisations of his live concerts of the period".

DownBeat awarded 4 stars to the album.

== Track listing ==
1. "Rita-San" (Art Pepper) – 7:55
2. "Ballad of the Sad Young Men" (Tommy Wolf, Fran Landesman) – 8:41
3. "My Laurie" (Art Pepper) – 8:25
4. "Mambo de la Pinta" (Art Pepper) – 12:41

== Personnel ==
- Art Pepper – alto saxophone
- George Cables – piano
- Tony Dumas – bass
- Carl Burnett – drums

== Sources ==
- Richard Cook & Brian Morton. The Penguin Guide to Jazz on CD 4th edition. Penguin, 1998. ISBN 0-14-051383-3
