= I Can't Believe That You're in Love with Me =

1926 song

"I Can't Believe That You're in Love with Me" is a 1926 popular song and jazz standard composed by Jimmy McHugh, with lyrics by Clarence Gaskill.

More than 20 recordings were made of "I Can't Believe That You're in Love with Me" in the 16 years following its publication. Early recordings included Roger Wolfe Kahn and His Orchestra (1926), Louis Armstrong (1930), Nat Gonella (1932), Earl Hines (1932), Artie Shaw (1938), Teddy Wilson (1938), and Ella Fitzgerald (1941).

It is sung twice by Claudia Drake in Edgar G. Ulmer's low-budget film noir classic Detour (1945); it is also featured in The Caine Mutiny (1954), where it is performed by the leading actress in an early scene and the composers credited prominently in the opening titles. In the 1967 film Thoroughly Modern Millie it is sung by an uncredited male vocalist on the gramophone.

== Notable recordings ==
- Billie Holiday (1938)
- Anita O'Day (1945)
- Frankie Laine (1946)
- Ames Brothers - this charted briefly in 1953
- Paul Quinichette - Moods (1954)
- Nelson Riddle (1954) - included in the 2-CD set Let's Face The Music (2008)
- Tony Bennett for his album Cloud 7 (1955)
- Louis Armstrong - included in the box set Satchmo: A Musical Autobiography (1956)
- Mel Tormé - Prelude to a Kiss (1958)
- Jimmy Rushing - Rushing Lullabies (1959)
- Dean Martin - This Time I'm Swingin'! (1960)
- Dinah Washington - included in her album September in the Rain (1960)
- Dinah Shore - included in her album Dinah Sings Some Blues with Red (1960)
- Frank Sinatra - Sinatra's Swingin' Session!!! (1961)
- Bobby Darin - for his album It's You or No One (1963)
- Art Pepper - Intensity (1963)
- Joe Williams with Count Basie and his orchestra - The Greatest!! Count Basie Plays, Joe Williams Sings Standards
- June Christy - A Friendly Session, Vol. 3 (2000) with the Johnny Guarnieri Quintet; Cool Christy (2002)
- Bing Crosby - recorded August 7, 1945 with Carmen Cavallaro on piano.
- Joni James - for her album 100 Strings and Joni...I’m in the Mood for Love (1960).
- Jack Jones - for his album There's Love & There's Love & There's Love (1965).
- New York Voices - on their album Sing! Sing! Sing! (2001)
- Mono Villegas - Grabaciones Ineditas Vol 4 (1996)
