= Phil Urso =

American jazz musician

Phil Urso (2 October 1925, Jersey City, New Jersey — 7 April 2008, Denver, Colorado) was an American jazz tenor saxophonist and composer known for his association with trumpeter Chet Baker.

Urso learned clarinet as a child and switched to tenor sax while in high school. He served in the Navy during World War II and then moved to New York City in 1947. There he played with Elliot Lawrence (1948–50), Woody Herman (1950-51), Terry Gibbs, Miles Davis (1952), Oscar Pettiford (1953), Jimmy Dorsey, and Bob Brookmeyer (1954). In 1955, he first began working with Chet Baker, and was a prominent contributor to Baker's Pacific Jazz releases in 1956. Urso and Baker would collaborate sporadically for some 30 years.

Urso worked with Claude Thornhill late in the 1950s, but receded from national attention in later decades. He moved to Denver and continued performing locally into the 2000s.

== Discography ==
=== As leader ===
- Sentimental Journey with Bob Banks (Regent, 1956)
- Salute Chet Baker with Carl Saunders (Jazzed Media, 2003)
- The Philosophy of Urso: Phil Urso's 1953–1959 Sessions (Fresh Sound, 2016)

=== As sideman ===
With Chet Baker

- Chet Baker & Crew (Pacific Jazz, 1956)
- Chet Baker Big Band (Pacific Jazz, 1957)
- Playboys (a.k.a. Picture of Heath, Pacific Jazz, 1957)
- The Most Important Jazz Album of 1964/65 (Colpix, 1964)
- Baby Breeze (Limelight, 1965)

With others

- Louis Armstrong, Louis and the Angels (Decca, 1957)
- The Hi-Lo's & Jerry Fielding, The Hi-Lo's and the Jerry Fielding Orchestra (Kapp, 1956)
- Gerry Mulligan & Chet Baker, Mulligan and Baker! (Jazztone, 1957)
- Art Pepper, The Artistry of Pepper (Pacific Jazz, 1962)
- Oscar Pettiford, The New Oscar Pettiford Sextet (Debut, 1953)

== Bibliography ==
- Phil Urso at Allmusic
- Leonard Feather and Ira Gitler, The Biographical Encyclopedia of Jazz. Oxford, 1999, p. 659.
- The New Grove Dictionary of Jazz, Second Edition, Volume 3, Edited by Barry Kernfeld, Grove, 2002, p. 816.
