= Sonny Stitt Plays Arrangements from the Pen of Quincy Jones =

Studio album by Sonny Stitt
- Released: 1956
- Recorded: September 30 and October 9, 1955; New York City
- Genre: Jazz
- Label: Roost; RLP 2204
- Producer: Teddy Reig

Sonny Stitt chronology
The Battle of Birdland (1954)	Sonny Stitt Plays Arrangements from the Pen of Quincy Jones (1956)	Sonny Stitt Plays (1955)

Professional ratings
Review scores
Source	Rating
Allmusic	4.5/5 stars

Sonny Stitt Plays Arrangements from the Pen of Quincy Jones is an album by saxophonist Sonny Stitt recorded in 1955 and originally released on the Roost label.

== Reception ==
The Allmusic site awarded the album 4½ stars.

== Track listing ==
All compositions by Sonny Stitt except as indicated

1. "My Funny Valentine" (Lorenz Hart, Richard Rodgers) – 3:26
2. "Sonny's Bunny" – 3:58
3. "Come Rain or Come Shine" (Harold Arlen, Johnny Mercer) – 4:19
4. "Love Walked In" (George Gershwin, Ira Gershwin) – 4:03
5. "If You Could See Me Now" (Tadd Dameron, Carl Sigman) – 4:29
6. "Quince" – 6:59
7. "Stardust" (Hoagy Carmichael, Mitchell Parish) – 3:08
8. "Lover" (Hart, Rodgers) – 3:24
- Recorded in New York City on September 30, 1955 (tracks 1, 2, 4 & 8) and October 9, 1955 (tracks 3 & 5–7)

== Personnel ==
- Sonny Stitt – alto saxophone
- Thad Jones (tracks 3, 5 & 6), Joe Newman (tracks 3, 5 & 6), Jimmy Nottingham (tracks 1, 2, 4, 8), Ernie Royal (tracks 1, 2, 4 & 8) – trumpet
- Jimmy Cleveland (tracks 3, 5 & 6), J. J. Johnson (tracks 1, 2, 4 & 8) – trombone
- Anthony Ortega – flute, alto saxophone (tracks 1–6 & 8)
- Seldon Powell – tenor saxophone (tracks 1–6 & 8)
- Cecil Payne – baritone saxophone (tracks 1–6 & 8)
- Hank Jones – piano
- Freddie Green – rhythm guitar
- Oscar Pettiford – bass
- Jo Jones – drums
- Quincy Jones – arranger, conductor
