= Living Legend (Art Pepper album) =

Studio album by Art Pepper
- Released: 1975
- Recorded: August 9, 1975
- Genre: Jazz
- Length: 49:00
- Label: Contemporary/OJC
- Producer: Lester Koenig

Art Pepper chronology
Intensity (1960)	Living Legend (1975)	The Trip (1976)

Living Legend is a 1975 jazz album by saxophonist Art Pepper, playing with pianist Hampton Hawes, bassist Charlie Haden and drummer Shelly Manne.

This was Art Pepper's "comeback" album, the first to be released after his long absence due to drug addiction and incarceration in San Quentin prison. Pepper had been finally released in 1966 and for a while only played tenor saxophone, showing how much of an influence John Coltrane had been on him in the intervening years. In 1968 Buddy Rich asked him to join his big band (on alto); Pepper borrowed an alto and, in his words, quoted in the sleeve notes to this album, "discovered I was able to say everything I wanted to say and I didn't have to sacrifice my individuality to be accepted or to be modern".

Following two operations for a ruptured spleen, Pepper moved into Synanon, a rehabilitation centre for recovering addicts, and began the slow return to full-time performing and recording.

== Reception ==
Professional ratings
Review scores
Source	Rating
AllMusic	4/5 stars
The Penguin Guide to Jazz Recordings	3.5/4 stars
The Rolling Stone Jazz Record Guide	3/5 stars

AllMusic reviewer Scott Yanow wrote that "Pepper displays a more explorative and darker style than he had previously. He also shows a greater emotional depth in his improvisations and was open to some of the innovations of the avant-garde in his search for greater self-expression."

== Track listing ==
1. "Ophelia" – 7:51
2. "Here's That Rainy Day" (Johnny Burke, Jimmy Van Heusen) – 5:40
3. "What Laurie Likes" – 6:45
4. "Mr. Yohe" – 7:10
5. "Lost Life" – 5:52
6. "Samba Mom-Mom" – 8:23

(Recorded on August 9, 1975.)

All songs written by Art Pepper unless otherwise noted.

== Personnel ==
- Art Pepper – alto saxophone
- Hampton Hawes – piano, electric piano
- Charlie Haden – bass
- Shelly Manne – drums
