= Tokyo Debut =

Live album by Art Pepper
- Released: 1995
- Recorded: April 5, 1977
- Venues: Yūbin Chokin Hall, Tokyo
- Genre: Jazz
- Length: 66:25
- Labels: Galaxy; GCD-4201-2
- Producer: Yasumasa Okamoto

Art Pepper chronology
| A Night in Tunisia (1977) | Tokyo Debut (1995) | No Limit (1977) |

First Live in Japan cover

Tokyo Debut is a live album by saxophonist Art Pepper recorded in Japan in 1977 by TBS Radio and originally released on the Japanese Polydor label in 1990 as First Live in Japan before being rereleased on the Galaxy label in 1995.

== Reception ==
Professional ratings
Review scores
| Source | Rating |
|---|---|
| AllMusic | 4.5/5 stars |
| The Penguin Guide to Jazz Recordings | 3/4 stars |

The AllMusic review by Scott Yanow noted "The unexpected enthusiasm of the crowd really got to Pepper and his improvisations (even though he is not playing with his regular group) are quite inspired. Memorable music".

== Track listing ==
All compositions by Art Pepper except where noted.

1. Introduction - 2:23
2. "Cherokee" (Ray Noble) - 12:03
3. "The Spirit Is Here" - 8:58
4. "Here's That Rainy Day" (Jimmy Van Heusen, Johnny Burke) - 6:47
5. "Straight Life" - 6:27
6. "Manteca" (Dizzy Gillespie, Chano Pozo, Gil Fuller) - 12:59
7. "Manhã de Carnaval" (Luiz Bonfá, Antônio Maria) - 7:49
8. "Samba de Orpheus" (Luiz Bonfa) mistitled as Felicidade on CD and incomplete - 3:00

== Personnel ==
- Art Pepper - alto saxophone
- Clare Fischer - electric piano
- Rob Fisher - bass
- Peter Riso - drums
- Poncho Sanchez - percussion - except tracks 3,4 and most of track 2
- Cal Tjader - vibraphone (tracks 6–8)
- Bob Redfield - guitar (tracks 6–8)
