= Chet Baker Big Band =

Studio album by Chet Baker
- Released: 1956
- Recorded: October 18, 19 & 26, 1956; Los Angeles, California
- Genre: Jazz
- Label: Pacific Jazz; PJ 1229
- Producer: Richard Bock

Chet Baker chronology
Chet Baker & Crew (1956)	Chet Baker Big Band (1956)	Playboys (1956)

Chet Baker Big Band is an album by jazz trumpeter Chet Baker recorded in 1956 and released on the Pacific Jazz label.

The album contains three tracks performed by an eleven-piece group and seven tracks played by a nine-piece group.

The repertoire is a mix of standards and original compositions by Christian Chevallier and Pierre Michelot as arranged by Jimmy Heath, Michelot, Chevallier, and Phil Urso.

Regarding "Worrying the Life Out of Me", the original LP liner notes state "Phil Urso, a regular member of Chet's current quintet (along with Bobby Timmons, James Bond, and Peter Littman), wrote and arranged 'Phil's Blues' and 'Worrying the Life Out of Me'." However, the composer credits listed on the same LP release state that the tune was composed by Miff Mole, Bob Russell, and Frank Signorelli, who copyrighted "Worryin' the Life Out of Me" in October 1945.

== Reception ==
Professional ratings
Review scores
Source	Rating
Allmusic	4/5 stars

Lindsay Planer of Allmusic states, "The critical argument proposing that Baker's style is more akin to bop — and the residual post-bop — than the West Coast cool that he is often connected with gets tremendous validation throughout".

== Track listing ==
1. "A Foggy Day" (George Gershwin, Ira Gershwin) - 3:29
2. "Mythe" (Christian Chevallier, Pierre Michelot) - 4:26
3. "Worrying the Life Out of Me" (Miff Mole, Bob Russell, Frank Signorelli) - 5:21
4. "Chet" (Michelot) - 4:11
5. "Not Too Slow" (Chevallier, Michelot) - 3:51
6. "Phil's Blues" (Phil Urso) - 4:37
7. "Darn That Dream" (Eddie DeLange, Jimmy Van Heusen) - 3:30
8. "Dinah" (Harry Akst, Sam M. Lewis, Joe Young) - 4:39
9. "V-Line" (Chevallier) - 3:24
10. "Tenderly" (Walter Gross, Jack Lawrence) - 4:04

== Personnel ==
- On “Tenderly”, “A Foggy Day”, and “Darn That Dream”

Chet Baker, Conte Candoli, Norman Faye, trumpet; Frank Rosolino, trombone; Art Pepper, Bud Shank, alto sax; Bill Perkins, Phil Urso, tenor sax, Bobby Timmons, piano; Jimmy Bond, bass; Lawrence Marable, drums

arranged by Jimmy Heath – recorded in Los Angeles, October 26, 1956

- On "Mythe”, “Chet”, “Not Too Slow”, “Phil's Blues”, “Dinah”, and “V-Line”

Chet Baker, trumpet; Bob Burgess, trombone; Fred Waters, alto sax; Phil Urso, alto, tenor, baritone sax; Bob Graf, tenor sax; Bill Hood, baritone sax; Bobby Timmons, piano; Jimmy Bond, bass; Peter Littman, drums

tracks (4, 6, 9) arr. by Christian Chevallier; (5, 8) arr. by Pierre Michelot; (7) arr. by Phil Urso – recorded in Los Angeles, October 18, 1956

- On “Worrying the Life Out of Me”

Chet Baker, trumpet; Bob Burgess, trombone; Fred Waters, alto sax; Phil Urso, alto, tenor, baritone sax; Bob Graf, tenor sax; Bill Hood, baritone sax; Bobby Timmons, piano; Jimmy Bond, bass; James McKean, drums

arranged by Phil Urso – recorded in Los Angeles, October 19, 1956
