= The Trip (Art Pepper album) =

Studio album by Art Pepper
- Released: 1977
- Recorded: September 15–16, 1976
- Genre: Jazz
- Length: 42:33
- Label: Contemporary/OJC
- Producer: Lester Koenig, John Koenig

Art Pepper chronology
Living Legend (1975)	The Trip (1977)	A Night in Tunisia (1977)

Professional ratings
Review scores
Source	Rating
AllMusic	4/5 stars
The Penguin Guide to Jazz on CD	3/4 stars
The Rolling Stone Jazz Record Guide	3/5 stars

The Trip is a 1976 jazz album by saxophonist Art Pepper, playing with pianist George Cables, bassist Happy Williams and drummer Elvin Jones.

This album features The Trip, one of Art Pepper's own melodies written in 1963 while in San Quentin. Pepper likened jazz to the storytelling that took place between the prisoners. As he says in the sleeve notes, "When I play,... the sound that comes out of this thing, this piece of metal is just me saying these things and taking people on a trip."

== Track listing ==
1. "The Trip" (Art Pepper) – 8:55
2. "A Song for Richard" (Joe Gordon) – 6:17
3. "Sweet Love of Mine" (Woody Shaw) – 6:34
4. "Junior Cat" (Art Pepper) – 7:46
5. "The Summer Knows" (Michel Legrand, Marilyn & Alan Bergman) – 7:09
6. "Red Car" (Art Pepper) – 5:45

(Recorded on September 15–16, 1976.)

== Personnel ==
- Art Pepper – alto saxophone
- George Cables – piano
- David Williams – bass
- Elvin Jones – drums

== Sources ==
- Richard Cook & Brian Morton. The Penguin Guide to Jazz on CD 4th edition. Penguin, 1998. ISBN 0-14-051383-3
