= Collections (Red Norvo, Art Pepper, Joe Morello and Gerry Wiggins album) =

Studio album by Red Norvo, Art Pepper, Joe Morello and Gerry Wiggins
- Released: 1957
- Recorded: January 3, 1957
- Studios: United Western Recorders, Los Angeles, CA
- Genre: Jazz
- Length: 38:48
- Labels: Intro; ILP-608
- Producer: Don Clark

Art Pepper chronology
Art Pepper with Warne Marsh (1956)	Collections (1957)	Modern Art (1957)

Collections is an album by vibraphonist Red Norvo, saxophonist Art Pepper, drummer Joe Morello and pianist Gerry Wiggins recorded in early 1957, which was originally released on the Intro label.

== Reception ==
Professional ratings
Review scores
Source	Rating
AllMusic	4.5/5 stars

The AllMusic review by Brandon Burke observed, "The most interesting performances on this record are by the similarly young Pepper, who appears on five of the album's ten tracks. Pepper sticks to the alto sax on all but the appropriately titled original 'Tenor Blooz' and delivers a meatier-than-expected tone for an alto player. Fine performances by both Norvo and Wiggins help make this a timeless West Coast jazz release. No real surprises here, but every track is a gem".

== Track listing ==
All compositions by Art Pepper, except where indicated.

1. "Tenor Blooz" - 4:55
2. "You're Driving Me Crazy" (Walter Donaldson) - 5:05
3. "Sweet Georgia Brown" (Ben Bernie, Maceo Pinkard, Kenneth Casey) - 2:27
4. "Little Girl" (Francis Henry, Madeline Hyde) - 2:45
5. "Pepper Steak" - 3:47
6. "Have You Met Miss Jones?" (Richard Rodgers, Lorenz Hart) - 3:15
7. "Yardbird Suite" (Charlie Parker) - 5:40
8. "I Don't Stand a Ghost of a Chance with You" (Victor Young, Bing Crosby, Ned Washington) - 4:25
9. "I've Got the World on a String" (Harold Arlen, Ted Koehler) - 3:09
10. "Straight Life" - 3:20

== Personnel ==
- Red Norvo - vibraphone
- Art Pepper - alto saxophone (tracks 2, 5, 7 & 10), tenor saxophone (track 1)
- Joe Morello - drums
- Gerry Wiggins - piano
- Ben Tucker - bass
- Howard Roberts - guitar
