= The Return of Art Pepper =

Studio album by Art Pepper
- Released: 1957
- Recorded: August 6, 1956
- Studio: Capitol (Hollywood)
- Genre: Jazz
- Length: 37:25
- Label: Jazz: West; JWLP-10
- Producer: Herbert Kimmel

Art Pepper chronology
Two Altos (1952–54)	The Return of Art Pepper (1957)	Playboys (1956)

The Return of Art Pepper is an album by saxophonist Art Pepper featuring sessions from 1956 recorded for the Jazz: West label after his first release from prison. The album was rereleased on CD on Blue Note Records with bonus tracks as The Return of Art Pepper: The Complete Art Pepper Aladdin Recordings Volume 1 in 1988.

== Reception ==
Professional ratings
Review scores
Source	Rating
AllMusic	3/5 stars
The Penguin Guide to Jazz Recordings	3/4 stars

The AllMusic review by Stephen Thomas Erlewine observed: "Pepper's chops are a little rusty, but you can hear that he still has a passion for playing, and he does improve over the course of these tracks. For serious Pepper fans, it's worth a listen, but for less dedicated fans, there are better places to become acquainted with his work".

== Track listing ==
All compositions by Art Pepper, except where indicated.

1. "Pepper Returns" - 4:26
2. "Broadway" (Buddy DeSylva, Ray Henderson, Lew Brown) - 4:56
3. "You Go to My Head" (J. Fred Coots, Haven Gillespie) - 4:15
4. "Angel Wings" - 4:40
5. "Funny Blues" - 4:36
6. "Five More" - 4:37
7. "Minority" - 4:17
8. "Patricia" - 3:33
9. "Mambo de la Pinta" - 4:15
10. "Walkin' Out Blues" - 5:52

== Personnel ==
- Art Pepper - alto saxophone
- Jack Sheldon - trumpet (tracks 1, 2, 4–7, 9 & 10)
- Russ Freeman - piano
- Leroy Vinnegar - bass
- Shelly Manne - drums
