= Art Pepper Today =

Studio album by Art Pepper
- Released: 1979
- Recorded: December 1 & 2, 1978
- Genre: Jazz
- Label: Galaxy
- Producer: Ed Michel

Art Pepper chronology
Among Friends (1978)	Art Pepper Today (1979)	New York Album (1979)

Art Pepper Today is a 1978 jazz album by saxophonist Art Pepper, playing with pianist Stanley Cowell, bassist Cecil McBee, drummer Roy Haynes and percussionist Kenneth Nash.

== Reception ==
Professional ratings
Review scores
Source	Rating
AllMusic	4/5 stars
Tom Hull	B+
The Penguin Guide to Jazz Recordings	3/4 stars
The Rolling Stone Jazz Record Guide	4/5 stars
DownBeat	5/5 stars

AllMusic reviewer Scott Yanow said that "Art Pepper, in the midst of a successful comeback, recorded this excellent set for Galaxy," which includes "a definitive version of his intense ballad 'Patricia'."

DownBeat gave the album 5 stars. Reviewer Terry Martin wrote, "Art Pepper Today finds the artist completely emotionally engaged with the themes and style of yesterday, and they leap to life with joyous urgency".

== Track listing ==
1. "Miss Who" (Art Pepper) – 4:42
2. "Mambo Koyama" (Art Pepper) – 6:40
3. "Lover Come Back To Me" (Sigmund Romberg; Oscar Hammerstein II) – 6:51
4. "Patricia" (Art Pepper) – 10:24
5. "These Foolish Things (Remind Me Of You)" (Harry Link; Jack Strachey; Holt Marvell) – 5:44
6. "Chris's Blues" (Art Pepper) – 3:50

(Recorded on December 1 & 2, 1978.)

== Personnel ==
- Art Pepper – alto saxophone
- Stanley Cowell – piano
- Cecil McBee – bass
- Roy Haynes – drums
- Kenneth Nash – congas & percussion on "Mambo Koyama"

Other tracks recorded at the same sessions but unissued at the time:
December 1, 1978

1. "I Love You" (Cole Porter) – 4:35
2. Untitled Original (a.k.a. "Pepper Pot") (Art Pepper) – 6:40
3. "Lover Come Back to Me" (Sigmund Romberg; Oscar Hammerstein II) alternate version – 0:00

December 2, 1978

1. "Yardbird Suite" (Charlie Parker) – 5:18
2. "Over the Rainbow" (Harold Arlen; E.Y. Harburg) – 8:50
3. "These Foolish Things (Remind Me of You)" (Harry Link; Jack Strachey; Holt Marvell) alternate version – 5:54
4. "Over the Rainbow" alternate version – 9:09

== Sources ==
- Richard Cook & Brian Morton. The Penguin Guide to Jazz on CD. Penguin, 4th edition, 1998. ISBN 0-14-051383-3
