= Among Friends (Art Pepper album) =

Studio album by Art Pepper
- Released: 1978
- Recorded: September 2, 1978
- Studio: United/Western, Hollywood, California.
- Genre: Jazz
- Length: 49:44
- Label: Interplay

Art Pepper chronology
San Francisco Samba (1977)	Among Friends (1978)	Art Pepper Today (1978)

Professional ratings
Review scores
Source	Rating
AllMusic	4/5 stars
The Rolling Stone Jazz Record Guide	4/5 stars
DownBeat	4/5 stars

Among Friends is a 1978 jazz studio album by American saxophonist Art Pepper, playing with pianist Russ Freeman, bassist Bob Magnusson and drummer Frank Butler. Freeman and Butler had played with Pepper in the 1950s.

== Track listing ==
1. "Among Friends" (Art Pepper)
2. "'Round Midnight" (Thelonious Monk)
3. "I'm Getting Sentimental Over You"
4. "Blue Bossa"
5. "What Is This Thing Called Love?"
6. "What's New"
7. "Besame Mucho"
8. "I'll Remember April"

(Recorded on September 2, 1978.)

== Personnel ==
- Art Pepper — alto saxophone
- Russ Freeman — piano
- Bob Magnusson — bass
- Frank Butler — drums
