= Joe Petruccio =

American artist (born 1958)

Joseph Albert Petruccio (born December 23, 1958) is an American artist known for his expressionist paintings and pop art of athletes, musicians, actors and most notably Elvis Presley.

== Career ==
Beginning in 1974, Petruccio became a protégé under artist LeRoy Neiman while studying art at the School of Visual Arts in New York, graduating in 1980. In 1983, while working as the creative art director for a Manhattan based advertising firm, Petruccio began his association with the New York Mets creating advertising and designing their now famous “Racing Stripe” uniforms; they were used on the road uniforms the previous season and would be worn with minor changes along the way until 1992.

In 2006 Petruccio created a series of fine art originals in connection with MGM and Sylvester Stallone to commemorate the 30th Anniversary of Rocky. In 2008 The Hard Rock Theme Park announced Petruccio as their official artist tasked to create artistic imagery throughout the park. In 2009 Muhammad Ali Enterprises named Petruccio their approved official artist.

Petruccio works in acrylic, oil, watercolor, pencil drawings, pastels, and lithographs. Petruccio was named by CNBC as "one of the best-known celebrity artists in the world."
