= The Thrill Is Gone (1931 song) =

Song
- Released: 1931
- Genre: Traditional pop, Jazz
- Composer: Ray Henderson
- Lyricist: Lew Brown

"The Thrill Is Gone" is a popular song composed by Ray Henderson with lyrics by Lew Brown which was first sung by Everett Marshall in the Broadway revue George White's Scandals in 1931.

The song was first recorded in 1931 by Rudy Vallée And His Connecticut Yankees on the Victor label. It became a hit at #10 on the charts and was recorded later by many other popular jazz artists throughout the following decades, eventually becoming a jazz standard.

After listening to Chet Baker's cover, Elvis Costello became inspired and wrote Almost Blue off the album Imperial Bedroom, trying to capture its "erie" quality.

== Notable versions ==
- Chet Baker - Chet Baker Sings (Pacific Jazz Records, 1954)
- Chet Baker - Pretty/Groovy (World Pacific, 1958)
- Chris Connor - This is Chris (Bethlehem, 1955)
- Ella Fitzgerald - Hello Dolly! (Verve, 1964)
- Stan Getz - Cool Velvet (Verve, 1960)
- Stan Kenton - Standards in Silhouette (Capitol, 1959)
- Julie London - Julie... At Home (Liberty, 1960)
- Nina Simone - Gifted & Black (1970)
- Sarah Vaughan - Vaughan And Violins (1959)
- Victor Young - (feat. Tommy Dorsey, Bing Crosby, & the Boswell Sisters) - Gems from "Geo. White's Scandals" (1931)
- Jeff Goldblum & the Mildred Snitzer Orchestra - (feat. Miley Cyrus) - "I Shouldn't Be Telling You This" (2019)
