= Art Pepper Meets the Rhythm Section =

Studio album by Art Pepper
- Released: 1957
- Recorded: January 19, 1957
- Genre: Jazz
- Length: 43:38
- Label: Contemporary/Original Jazz Classics
- Producer: Lester Koenig

Art Pepper chronology
Modern Art (1957)	Art Pepper Meets the Rhythm Section (1957)	Mucho Calor (1957)

Art Pepper Meets the Rhythm Section is a 1957 jazz album by saxophonist Art Pepper with pianist Red Garland, bassist Paul Chambers and drummer Philly Joe Jones, who were the acclaimed rhythm section for Miles Davis at that time. The album is considered a milestone in Pepper's career.

== Recording ==
According to Pepper, the album was recorded under enormous pressure, as he first learned of the recording session the morning he was due in the studio, and he had never met the other musicians, all of whom he greatly admired. He was playing on an instrument in a bad state of repair, and was suffering from a drug problem. Purportedly, Pepper had not played the saxophone for some time, either for two weeks (according to the liner notes), or six months (according to Pepper's autobiography Straight Life). However, the discography in Straight Life indicates that Pepper had recorded many sessions in the previous weeks, including one five days earlier for Pepper's album Modern Art.

== Reception ==
Professional ratings
Review scores
Source	Rating
AllMusic	5/5 stars
The All Music Guide	5/5 stars
The Encyclopedia of Popular Music	5/5 stars
Jazzwise	5/5 stars
The Penguin Guide to Jazz	(Core Collection)
The Rolling Stone Jazz Record Guide	5/5 stars

Michael G. Nastos of AllMusic called the recording "a classic east meets west, cool plus hot but never lukewarm combination that provides many bright moments for the quartet during this exceptional date from that great year in music, 1957." Becky Byrkit, writing for The All Music Guide, deemed the album "a diamond of recorded jazz history."

Brian Morton and Richard Cook, writing for The Penguin Jazz Guide (10th ed.), described Meets the Rhythm Section as "a poetic, burning date, with all four men playing above themselves... Between them, they'd delivered a masterpiece." In previous Penguin Guide editions, the album was included in the "Core Collection," and received a four-star rating (of a possible four stars).

The New York Times critic Ben Ratliff described Meets the Rhythm Section as "an honest record; if you believe the story of its making, you'd have to conclude that Pepper, unprepared and unarmored, was forced to pull the music out of himself, since tepid run-throughs and stock licks weren't going to work in such exalted company."

== Track listing ==
1. "You'd Be So Nice to Come Home To" (Cole Porter) – 5:25
2. "Red Pepper Blues" (Art Pepper, Red Garland) – 3:37
3. "Imagination" (Jimmy Van Heusen, Johnny Burke) – 5:52
4. "Waltz Me Blues" (Art Pepper, Paul Chambers) – 2:56
5. "Straight Life" (Art Pepper) – 3:59
6. "Jazz Me Blues" (Tom Delaney) – 4:47
7. "Tin Tin Deo" (Gil Fuller, Chano Pozo) – 7:42
8. "Star Eyes" (Gene de Paul, Don Raye) – 5:12
9. "Birks' Works" (Dizzy Gillespie) – 4:17
10. "The Man I Love" (George Gershwin, Ira Gershwin) – 6:36 [added to the remastered recording in 2002]

(Recorded on January 19, 1957 at Contemporary's Studios, Los Angeles.)

== Personnel ==
- Art Pepper - alto saxophone
- Red Garland - piano
- Paul Chambers - bass
- Philly Joe Jones - drums
