= Russ Freeman (pianist) =

American jazz pianist and composer (1926–2002)

- Russ Freeman in the studio, 1951

Background information
- Born: Russell Donald Freeman; May 28, 1926; Chicago, Illinois, United States
- Died: June 27, 2002 (aged 76) Las Vegas, Nevada, United States
- Genres: Bebop, cool jazz
- Occupations: Pianist, composer
- Instrument: Piano
- Formerly of: Art Pepper; Shorty Rogers; Chet Baker; Shelly Manne; André Previn

Russell Donald Freeman (May 28, 1926 – June 27, 2002) was a bebop and cool jazz pianist and composer.

Initially, Freeman was classically trained. His reputation as a jazz pianist grew in the 1940s after working with Art Pepper and Shorty Rogers. He played with Charlie Parker on the 1947 "Home Cooking" jazz session. Numerous collaborations followed in the 1950s with Chet Baker, Shelly Manne, and Art Pepper. These collaborations included the Jazz Immortal LP recorded with Russ Freeman and jazz trumpeter Clifford Brown in 1954, which included leading musicians Brown and Zoot Sims. On the Jazz Immortal LP, Freeman was able to play in a combo that recorded many Clifford Brown compositions.

In 1957, he collaborated with André Previn on the album Double Play!, where they both played piano, accompanied only by Manne on drums.

In 1988, Keith Jarrett performed a version of Freeman's "The Wind" in a solo concert in Paris, which is featured on his album Paris Concert. In 1991, Mariah Carey wrote her own lyrics to "The Wind" for her album Emotions. Freeman had written "The Wind" with original lyrics by Jerry Gladstone; it had been performed as an instrumental piece during the 1950s and 1960s by Baker, Leo Wright, and Stan Getz, and had been sung by vocalist June Christy (on The Misty Miss Christy). Freeman's piano is featured on Baker's 1954 recording of "The Wind" (featured on Chet Baker & Strings). Freeman remained busy in music throughout his life, transitioning from jazz pianist to film scoring and composition, before his death in Las Vegas in 2002.

Freeman was married three times. He had a daughter, Paula Kenley Freeman, from his second marriage in 1959, and a son, Sean McCoy, from a relationship in 1958 with jazz pianist Pat Moran. Paula moved from Seattle to live in the Netherlands in 2009, and an interview about her relationship with her father appeared in the May 2009 issue of the European magazine, PianoWereld. Sean is the owner and recording engineer at Oregon Sound Recording studio in Central Point, Oregon.

== Discography ==
With Chet Baker

- Chet Baker Sings (Pacific Jazz, 1953)
- Grey December (Pacific Jazz, 1953 [1992])
- Chet Baker Quartet featuring Russ Freeman (Pacific Jazz, 1953)
- Witch Doctor (Contemporary, 1953 [1985])
- West Coast Live - with Stan Getz (1954 [1997])
- Pretty/Groovy (World Pacific, 1953-54 [1958])
- The Trumpet Artistry of Chet Baker (Pacific Jazz, 1953–54)
- Chet Baker & Strings (Columbia, 1954)
- Jazz at Ann Arbor (Pacific Jazz, 1954)
- Chet Baker Sings and Plays (Pacific Jazz, 1955)
- Quartet: Russ Freeman/Chet Baker (Pacific Jazz, 1956)

With Maynard Ferguson

- Maynard Ferguson's Hollywood Party (EmArcy, 1954)
- Dimensions (EmArcy, 1955)

With Jimmy Giuffre

- Jimmy Giuffre (Capitol, 1955)

With Irene Kral

- Wonderful Life (Mainstream, 1965)

With Shelly Manne

- "The Three" & "The Two" (Contemporary, 1954 [1960]) - compilation of previously issued 10-inch LPs
- The West Coast Sound (Contemporary, 1955)
- Shelly Manne & Russ Freeman (Contemporary, 1955)
- Swinging Sounds (Contemporary, 1956)
- More Swinging Sounds (Contemporary, 1956)
- Concerto for Clarinet & Combo (Contemporary, 1957)
- The Gambit (Contemporary, 1958)
- Shelly Manne & His Men Play Peter Gunn (Contemporary, 1959)
- Ruth Price with Shelly Manne & His Men at the Manne-Hole (Contemporary, 1961) with Ruth Price
- Live! Shelly Manne & His Men at the Manne-Hole (Contemporary, 1961)
- Shelly Manne & His Men Play Checkmate (Contemporary, 1961)
- My Fair Lady with the Un-original Cast (Capitol, 1964)
- Manne–That's Gershwin! (Capitol, 1965)
- Boss Sounds! (Atlantic, 1966)
- One on One (Atlas, 1982)
- Jazz From the Pacific Northwest (Reel to Real, 2024)

With Jack Montrose

- Arranged by Montrose (Pacific Jazz, 1954)

With Art Pepper

- Surf Ride (Savoy, 1952-1954 [1956])
- The Return of Art Pepper (Jazz: West, 1956)
- The Art Pepper Quartet (Tampa, 1956)
- Modern Art (Intro, 1957)
- Mucho Calor (Andex, 1957) with Conte Candoli
- Among Friends (Interplay, 1978)

With André Previn

- Double Play! (Contemporary, 1957)
- The Subterraneans (Soundtrack) (MGM, 1960)

With Pete Rugolo

- Rugolomania (Columbia, 1955)
- New Sounds by Pete Rugolo (Harmony, 1954–55, [1957])
- Music for Hi-Fi Bugs (EmArcy, 1956)
- Out on a Limb (EmArcy, 1956)
- An Adventure in Sound: Brass in Hi-Fi (Mercury 1956 [1958])
- 10 Trombones Like 2 Pianos (Mercury, 1960)
