= A Night in Tunisia (Art Pepper album) =

Live album by Art Pepper
- Released: 1983
- Recorded: January 23, 1977
- Venue: Bach Dynamite & Dancing Society, Half Moon Bay, CA
- Genre: Jazz
- Length: 46:37
- Label: Storyville; STCD 4146
- Producer: Laurie Pepper

Art Pepper chronology
| The Trip (1976) | A Night in Tunisia (1983) | Tokyo Debut (1977) |

Art Pepper Memorial Collection cover

A Night in Tunisia is a live album by saxophonist Art Pepper, recorded in California in 1977 by and originally released on the Japanese Trio label in 1983 as Volume 4 of the Art Pepper Memorial Collection before being rereleased on the Storyville label in 1988.

== Reception ==
Professional ratings
Review scores
| Source | Rating |
|---|---|
| AllMusic | 4/5 stars |
| The Penguin Guide to Jazz Recordings | 2.5/4 stars |

The AllMusic review by Scott Yanow noted, "Since this was not one of Pepper's strongest groups, the LP is not essential, but fans of the unique altoist will want to pick up these interesting performances".

== Track listing ==
All compositions by Art Pepper except where noted.

1. "Mr. Yohe" / "The Golden Gate Bridge" - 15:20
2. "The Trip" / Introduction - 11:46
3. "Lost Life" - 8:40
4. "A Night in Tunisia" (Dizzy Gillespie, Frank Paparelli) - 11:31

== Personnel ==
- Art Pepper - alto saxophone
- Smith Dobsen - piano
- Jim Nichols - bass
- Brad Bilhorn - drums
