= Art Pepper =

American jazz alto saxophonist (1925–1982)

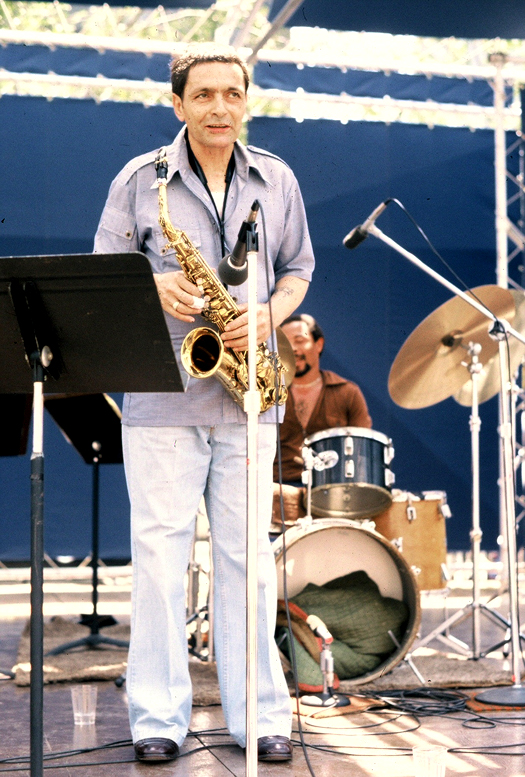
- Pepper in Los Angeles, 1979

Background information
- Born: Arthur Edward Pepper Jr. September 1, 1925; Gardena, California, U.S.
- Died: June 15, 1982 (aged 56) Los Angeles, California, U.S.
- Genres: Jazz; West Coast jazz; cool jazz
- Occupation: Musician
- Instruments: Saxophone; clarinet
- Years active: 1946–1960, 1975–1982
- Labels: Savoy; Discovery; Pacific Jazz; Contemporary; Fresh Sound; Galaxy; Xanadu; Intro; Score

Arthur Edward Pepper Jr. (September 1, 1925 – June 15, 1982) was an American jazz musician, mostly as an alto saxophonist. He occasionally performed and recorded on tenor saxophone, clarinet (his first instrument) and bass clarinet. Active primarily in West Coast jazz, Pepper first came to prominence in Stan Kenton's big band. He was known for his emotionally charged performances and several stylistic shifts throughout his career, and was described by critic Scott Yanow as having "attained his goal of becoming the world's greatest altoist" at the time of his death in 1982.

== Early life ==
Art Pepper was born in Gardena, California, United States. His mother was a 14-year-old runaway; his father, a merchant seaman. Both were violent alcoholics, and when Pepper was still quite young, he was sent to live with his paternal grandmother. He expressed early musical interest and talent, and he was given lessons. He began playing clarinet at the age of nine, switched to alto saxophone at 13, and immediately began jamming on Central Avenue, the black nightclub district of Los Angeles.

== Career ==
At the age of 17, Pepper began playing professionally with Benny Carter and then became part of the Stan Kenton orchestra, touring with that band until he was drafted in 1943. After the war, he returned to Los Angeles, and joined the Kenton Innovations Orchestra. By the 1950s, Pepper was recognized as one of the leading alto saxophonists in jazz, finishing second only to Charlie Parker as Best Alto Saxophonist in the DownBeat magazine Readers Poll of 1952. Along with Chet Baker, Gerry Mulligan, and Shelly Manne, and perhaps due more to geography than playing style, Pepper is often associated with the musical movement known as West Coast jazz, as contrasted with the East Coast (or "hot") jazz of Charlie Parker, Dizzy Gillespie and Miles Davis. Some of Pepper's best known albums from the 1950s are Art Pepper Meets the Rhythm Section, Art Pepper + Eleven – Modern Jazz Classics, Gettin' Together, and Smack Up. Other recordings from this time appear on The Aladdin Recordings (three volumes), The Early Show, The Late Show, Surf Ride, and Art Pepper with Warne Marsh (also issued as The Way It Was!), which features a session recorded with tenor saxophonist Warne Marsh.

Pepper's career was repeatedly interrupted by several prison stints stemming from his addiction to heroin, but he managed to have several productive "comebacks". Remarkably, his substance abuse and legal travails did not affect the quality of his recordings, which maintained a high level of musicianship throughout his career until his death in 1982.

The last comeback saw Pepper, who had started his career in Stan Kenton's big band, becoming a member of Buddy Rich's Big Band from 1968 to 1969. After beginning methadone therapy in the mid-1970s, Pepper toured Europe and Japan with his own groups and recorded many albums, mostly for Galaxy Records, a subsidiary of Fantasy Records. Pepper's later albums include Living Legend, Art Pepper Today, Among Friends, and Live in Japan.

== Personal life ==
Pepper lived for many years in the hills of Echo Park, in Los Angeles. He became a heroin addict in the 1940s, and his career was interrupted by drug-related prison sentences in 1954–56, 1960–61, 1961–64, and 1964–65; the final two sentences were served in San Quentin. While in San Quentin, he played in an ensemble with saxophonist Frank Morgan who was also serving a sentence on drug charges. In the late 1960s, Pepper spent time in Synanon, a rehabilitation program that turned out to be a cult.

His autobiography, Straight Life (1980, co-written with his third wife Laurie Pepper), discusses the jazz music world, as well as drug and criminal subcultures of mid-20th century California. Among the many anecdotes shared from his life, Pepper describes a sexual encounter with a woman while stationed in London during the Second World War that T.J. English says would probably be regarded as rape though the word is not used by Pepper. Soon after the publication of this book, director Don McGlynn released the documentary film Art Pepper: Notes from a Jazz Survivor, discussing his life and featuring interviews with both Art and his wife Laurie, as well as footage from a live performance in a Malibu jazz club. Laurie Pepper also released an interview to NPR.

Pepper died of a stroke in Los Angeles on June 15, 1982, aged 56. He is interred in the Abbey of the Psalms Mausoleum in the Hollywood Forever Cemetery, Hollywood.

== Discography ==
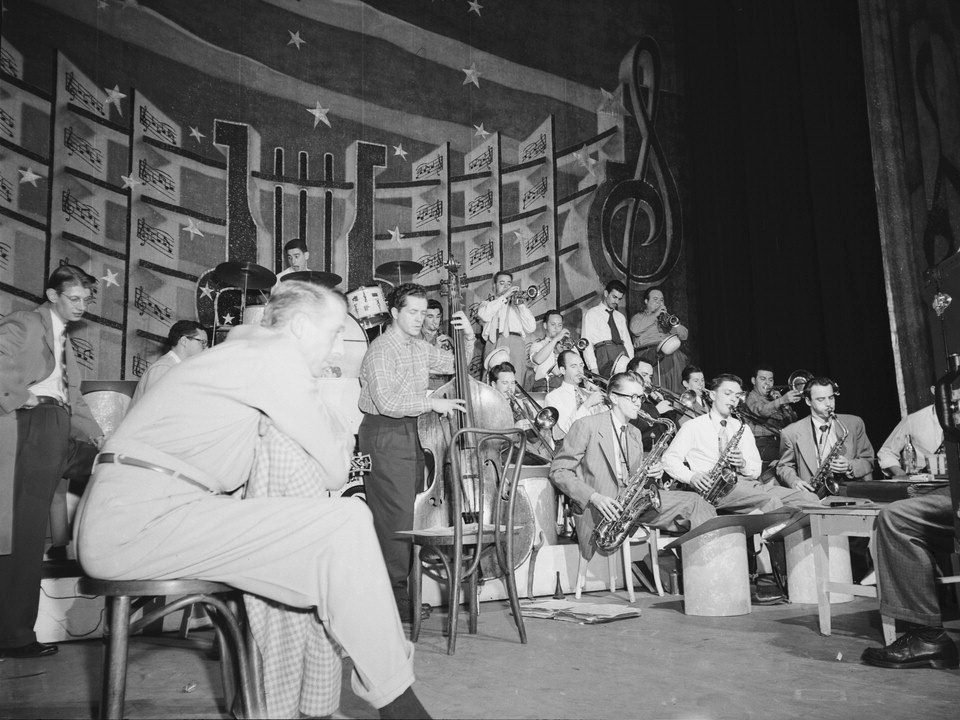
Stan Kenton, Eddie Safranski, Shelly Manne, Chico Alvarez, Ray Wetzel, Harry Betts, Bob Cooper, and Pepper (second from right), 1947 or 1948

=== As leader ===
- Surf Ride (Savoy, 1956) – recorded in 1952–54
- Two Altos with Sonny Red (Regent, 1959) – recorded in 1952–54
- The Return of Art Pepper with Jack Sheldon (Jazz West, 1956)
- Playboys with Chet Baker and Phil Urso (Pacific Jazz, 1956) – reissued as Picture of Heath
- The Art Pepper Quartet (Tampa, 1957) – recorded in 1956
- Collections with Red Norvo, Joe Morello and Gerry Wiggins (Intro, 1957)
- Modern Art (Intro, 1957) – recorded in 1956–57
- Art Pepper Meets the Rhythm Section (Contemporary, 1957)
- Art Pepper + Eleven – Modern Jazz Classics (Contemporary, 1959)
- Gettin' Together with Conte Candoli (Contemporary, 1960)
- Smack Up with Jack Sheldon (Contemporary, 1960)
- Intensity (Contemporary, 1963) – recorded in 1960
- Art Pepper Quartet in San Francisco (Fresh Sound, 1964) – live
- Art Pepper Quintet : Live at Donte's 1968 with Joe Romano (Fresh Sound, 1968) – live
- The Art of Pepper (Onyx, 1974) – recorded in 1957
- Garden State Jam Sessions Bootleg (Lone Hill Jazz, 1975) – live
- I'll Remember April : Live at Foothill College (Storyville, 1975)
- Living Legend (Contemporary, 1975)
- The Trip (Contemporary, 1976)
- A Night in Tunisia (Storyville, 1977) – live
- Tokyo Debut (Galaxy, 1977) – live; also released as First Live in Japan
- No Limit (Contemporary, 1977)
- Thursday Night at the Village Vanguard (Contemporary, 1977) – live
- Friday Night at the Village Vanguard (Contemporary, 1977) – live
- Saturday Night at the Village Vanguard (Contemporary, 1977) – live
- More for Les at the Village Vanguard (Contemporary, 1977) – live
- Live in Japan, Vol. 1: Ophelia (Storyville, 1978)
- Live in Japan, Vol. 2 (Storyville, 1978)
- Among Friends (Interplay, 1978)
- Art Pepper Today (Galaxy, 1978)
- Landscape (Galaxy, 1979) – live
- Besame Mucho (Galaxy, 1979) – live
- Straight Life (Galaxy, 1979)
- So in Love (Artists House, 1980) – recorded in 1979
- One September Afternoon (Galaxy, 1980)
- Winter Moon with Howard Roberts (Galaxy, 1981) – recorded in 1980
- Roadgame (Galaxy, 1982) – live recorded in 1981
- Goin' Home with George Cables (Galaxy, 1982)
- Darn That Dream (Real Time, 1982)
- Art Lives (Galaxy, 1983) – live recorded in 1981
- Tête-à-Tête with George Cables (Galaxy, 1983) – recorded in 1982
- Artworks (Galaxy, 1984) – recorded in 1979
- APQ (Galaxy, 1984) – live recorded in 1981
- New York Album (Galaxy, 1985) – recorded in 1979
- Stardust (Victor (Japan), 1985) – recorded in 1979
- Art Pepper with Warne Marsh (Contemporary, 1986) – recorded in 1956; reissued tracks from The Way It Was! (1972)
- Tokyo Encore (Dreyfus, 1991) – live recorded in 1979
- Arthur's Blues (Galaxy, 1991) – live recorded in 1981
- Art in L.A. (WestWind, 1991)[2CD] – recorded in 1957–60
- Live in Japan: The Summer Knows (Absord (Japan), 1994) – live
- Art 'n' Zoot with Zoot Sims (Pablo, 1995) – live recorded in 1981
- Art Pepper with Duke Jordan in Copenhagen 1981 with Duke Jordan (Galaxy, 1996) – live recorded in 1981
- San Francisco Samba (Contemporary, 1997) – live recorded in 1977
- Unreleased Art, Vol. 1–11 (Widow's Taste, 2006–)
- Art Pepper – An Afternoon in Norway: The Kongsberg Concert (Elemental Music, 2025) – recorded June 29, 1980

=== As sideman ===
With Chet Baker

- The Route with Richie Kamuca (Pacific Jazz, 1956)
- Chet Baker Big Band (Pacific Jazz, 1956)

With Toni Harper

- Lady Lonely (RCA, 1959)
- Night Mood (RCA, 1960)

With Stan Kenton

- Stan Kenton's Milestones (Capitol, 1950) – recorded in 1943–47
- Stan Kenton Classics (Capitol, 1952) – recorded in 1944–47
- Encores (Capitol, 1947)
- A Presentation of Progressive Jazz (Capitol, 1947)
- Innovations in Modern Music (Capitol, 1950)
- Stan Kenton Presents (Capitol, 1950)
- Popular Favorites by Stan Kenton (Capitol, 1953)
- This Modern World (Capitol, 1953)
- The Kenton Era (Capitol, 1955) – recorded in 1940–54
- The Innovations Orchestra (Capitol, 1997) – recorded in 1950–51

With Milcho Leviev

- Blues for the Fisherman (Mole, 1980) – live
- True Blues (Mole, 1980) – live

With Shorty Rogers

- Modern Sounds (Capitol, 1952)[10"] – recorded in 1951
- Shorty Rogers and His Giants (RCA Victor, 1953)[10"]
- Cool and Crazy (RCA Victor, 1953)[10"]
- The Swingin' Nutcracker (RCA Victor, 1960)
- Popo (Xanadu, 1980) – recorded in 1951

With others

- Jesse Belvin, Mr. Easy (RCA, 1960) – recorded in 1959
- Hoagy Carmichael, Hoagy Sings Carmichael (Pacific Jazz, 1957) – recorded in 1956
- Dolo Coker, California Hard with Blue Mitchell (Xanadu, 1977) – recorded in 1976
- Richie Cole, Return to Alto Acres (Palo Alto, 1982)
- Conte Candoli, Mucho Calor with Bill Perkins, Russ Freeman, Ben Tucker, Chuck Flores, Jack Costanzo and Mike Pacheko (Andex/VSOP, 1957)
- Herb Ellis and Jimmy Giuffre, Herb Ellis Meets Jimmy Giuffre (Verve, 1959)
- Art Farmer, On the Road (Contemporary, 1976)
- Jerry Fielding, The Gauntlet (Warner Bros., 1978) – Soundtrack recorded in 1977
- Johnny Griffin, Birds and Ballads (Galaxy, 1978)
- Freddie Hubbard, Mistral (East World, 1981) – recorded in 1980
- Elvin Jones, Very R.A.R.E. (Trio (Japan), 1980) – recorded in 1979
- Barney Kessel, Some Like It Hot (Contemporary, 1959)
- Shelly Manne, The West Coast Sound (Contemporary, 1956) – recorded in 1953–55
- Jack Nitzsche, Heart Beat (Capitol, 1980) – Soundtrack
- Anita O'Day, Cool Heat (Verve, 1959)
- Marty Paich, The Marty Paich Quartet featuring Art Pepper (Tampa/VSOP, 1956)
- André Previn, The Subterraneans (MGM, 1960) – soundtrack
- Buddy Rich Big Band, Mercy, Mercy (Pacific Jazz, 1968) – live

== Transcriptions ==
Published transcriptions:

- Jazz Styles and Analysis: Alto Sax by Harry Miedema. Chicago, Fifth Printing, February 1979. Includes Broadway.
- Straight Life: the Story of Art Pepper by Art Pepper and Laurie Pepper. New York and London, 1979. ISBN 0-02-871820-8. Includes the head of Straight Life.
- Jazz 2: Sax Alto. Transcribed by John Robert Brown. International Music Publications, Woodford Green, Essex, 1986. ISBN 0-86359-408-5. Includes 'Round Midnight.
- The Genius of Art Pepper. Foreword by Laurie Pepper. North Sydney, Warner/Chappell Music, 1987. ISBN 1-86362-012-5. Includes: Arthur's Blues; Blues for Blanche; Funny Blues; Landscape; Make a List Make a Wish; Mambo de la Pinta; Mambo Koyama; Mr Big Falls his J.G. Hand; Our Song; Road Game; September Song; Tete a Tete. All transcriptions include parts for Alto and Rhythm; Funny Blues also has a part for Trumpet.
- Masters of the Alto Saxophone Play The Blues. Jazz Alto Solos. Transcribed by Trent Kynaston and Jonathan Ball. Corybant Productions, 1990. Includes True Blues.
- The Art Pepper Collection. Foreword by Jeff Sultanof. Milwaukee, Hal Leonard, 1995. ISBN 0-7935-4007-0. Includes: Art's Oregano; Diane; Landscape; Las Cuevas de Mario; Make a List (Make a Wish); Mr. Big Falls his J.G. Hand; Ophelia; Pepper Returns; Sometime; Straight Life; Surf Ride(I); Surf Ride(II); That's Love; The Trip; Waltz Me Blues.
- West Coast Jazz Saxophone Solos transcribed and edited by Robert A. Luckey, Ph.D. Features 15 recorded solos from 1952 to 1961, including five solos by Art Pepper. Olympia Music Publishing, 1996. ISBN 0-9667047-1-1.

Transcriptions available on the Internet:

- "Anthropology"
- "Birk's Works"
- "Groovin' High"
- "Red Pepper Blues"
- "Star Eyes"
- "The Way You Look Tonight"
- "Too Close For Comfort"
- "What Is This Thing Called Love?"
- "You'd Be So Nice To Come Home To"

== Bibliography ==
A more extensive bibliography is issued by the Jazzinstitut Darmstadt

- 1956: John Tyna, "Art Pepper... Tells the Tragic Role Narcotics Played in Blighting His Career and Life", Downbeat, September 19, 1956, p. 16.
- 1957: John Tynan, "Art Pepper Quartet", Downbeat, May 16, 1957, p. 34.
- 1960: J. McKinney, "Art Pepper: Profile of a Comeback", Metronome, lxxvii, September 1960, p. 26.
- 1960: John Tynan, "The Return of Art Pepper", Downbeat, xxvii/8, 1960, p. 17.
- 1960: John Tynan, "End of the Road", Downbeat, xxvii/25, 1960, p. 13.
- 1964: John Tynan, "Art Pepper's not the Same", Downbeat, xxxi/22, 1964, p. 18.
- 1965: Ernie Edwards Jr. et al. "Jazz Discographies Unlimited" Presents "Art Pepper". A Complete Discography Compiled by Ernie Edwards, Jr. Jazz Discographies Unlimited, Spotlight Series, Vol. 4. October 1965. 22pp.
- 1973: C. Marra, "Art Pepper: 'I'm Here to Stay!'" Downbeat, xl/4, 1973, p. 16.
- 1975: L. Underwood, "Pepper's Painful Road to Pure Art". Downbeat, xlii/11, 1975, p. 16.
- 1979: Art Pepper and Laurie Pepper, Straight Life: the Story of Art Pepper. New York and London, 1979. ISBN 0-02-871820-8. Includes a discography.
- 1979: P. Welding, "Art Pepper: Rewards of the Straight Life", Downbeat, xlvi/18, 1979, p. 16.
- 1979: Chris Sheridan, "The Contemporary Art of Pepper", Jazz Journal International, Vol. 32, No. 9, September 1979, p. 9.
- 1979: "The evolution of an individualist". Interview with Les Tomkins.
- 1980: "Art Pepper", Swing Journal, xxxiv/1, 1980, p. 162.
- 1980: "At Ronnie's". Interview with Les Tomkins.
- 1980: "A rich past, and a bright future". Interview with Les Tomkins.
- 1981: "New Fields Still to Conquer"; Interview with Les Tomkins.
- 1981: Gary Giddins, "The Whiteness of the Wail", in Riding on a Blue Note. New York: Oxford University Press, 1981, pp. 252–257. (An article originally published in July 1977.)
- 1986: David Nicholson Pepperell, "Art Pepper: I Want to Play so Bad", Wire Magazine, Issue 28, June 1986, pp. 26–31.
- 1986: Gary Giddins, "Art Pepper, 1926–1982", in Rhythm-a-ning: Jazz Tradition and Innovation in the 80s. New York: OUP, 1986, pp. 106–108. (An article originally published in June 1982.)
- 1992: Ted Gioia, "Straight Life", in West Coast Jazz: Modern Jazz in California, 1945–1960. New York and Oxford: OUP, 1992, pp. 283–307 (Chapter Fourteen). ISBN 0-19-508916-2.
- 2000: Todd Selbert, The Art Pepper Companion: Writings on a Jazz Original. Cooper Square Press, 2000. ISBN 978-0-8154-1067-6.
- 2014: Laurie Pepper, ART: Why I Stuck with a Junkie Jazzman. Arthur Pepper Music Corporation ISBN 978-1494297572
- 2014: Lily Anolik, "The Tale of the Tape". Harper's Magazine, September 2014.
