= Walkin' Shoes =

- by Gerry Mulligan
- Genre: Jazz
- Recorded: 1952

"Walkin' Shoes" is a jazz composition by Gerry Mulligan. He recorded it with Chet Baker in 1952 and it is the second track on the album "Gerry Mulligan Quartet with Chet Baker". It has been cited as one of Mulligan's most popular compositions. The construction is AABA.
