= Straight Life (book) =

1979 autobiography by Art and Laurie Pepper

Straight Life: The Story of Art Pepper
- Hardcover edition
- Author: Art Pepper and Laurie Pepper
- Language: English
- Genre: Non-fiction
- Publisher: Schirmer Books
- Publication date: 1979
- Publication place: United States
- Media type: Print
- Pages: 517
- ISBN: 0028718208

Straight Life: The Story of Art Pepper is the autobiography of jazz saxophonist Art Pepper written with his wife, Laurie Pepper. It was published in 1979 by Schirmer Books.

== Background ==
In April, 1972, musician Art Pepper agreed to tell the story of his life to his wife, Laurie Pepper. Although he quickly lost interest in the process, she used her privileged position to keep him answering her questions for seven years. Using the standard oral history techniques of modern anthropology, she tape recorded, transcribed, re-interviewed, and edited that material, also interviewing "relatives, acquaintances, and friends" to assemble and present often contradictory accounts.

== Contents ==
The book is mainly a description of events in Art Pepper's life. He details his early sexual anxiety; his turning to alcohol, marijuana and harder drugs, leading to periods in prison; marriage and divorce; developing racism; and addiction treatment at Synanon. He also discusses his music, including his influences, attention to tone in his playing, and his philosophy towards his own performances. His despair, sense of inevitability about the course of his life, and lies and contradictions combine to accentuate the impression of honesty in the account of his life. Added to his story are contributions from friends and family members, plus reprinted articles from DownBeat magazine. These often contrast with his own account of events. The book also contains Pepper's discography to June 1979.

== Reception ==
Whitney Balliett, critic and reviewer for The New Yorker, commented that Pepper's writing displayed "the ear and memory and interpretative lyricism of a first-rate novelist". Lewis Porter suggested that "Pepper seems to have been motivated by a compulsion to bare it all, with a minimum of interpretation." The Washington Post's book reviewer, Jonathan Yardley, wrote that "it is my hunch, [...] or perhaps more accurately my hope, that sooner or later it will come to be recognized as a work of commanding power, withering candor and raw artistry – certainly the best of the many jazz autobiographies, and much more than that". In Yardleys's view, the book was written "not merely to exorcise his own demons but also to destroy the jazz myth, to prove that 'Young Man With a Horn' is a lie". Poet Robert Pinsky said, "the style of his book like the style of real poetry, disrupts ease with discovery".

A Billboard reviewer in 1994 commented that "Few modern autobiographies can rival 'Straight Life' in sheer horror and power". Literary scholar Terry Castle described the book in 2004 as "a rhapsodic riff on self-destruction. It is also one of the greatest, saddest autobiographies ever written".

== Publication ==
The first edition was published by Schirmer Books in 1979.

The book was republished in an updated form in 1994; this version added an afterword that detailed Pepper's life between 1979 and his death in 1982. The afterword was written by Laurie Pepper; the book also included an introduction by jazz critic Gary Giddins.
