= Lee Konitz discography =

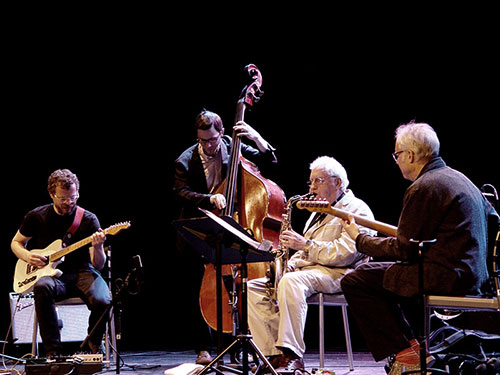
Jakob Bro, Lee Konitz, Bill Frisell and Thomas Morgan in Aarhus, Denmark 2015

This is the discography for American jazz musician Lee Konitz.

== Albums ==
=== As leader/co-leader ===
- 1949–50: Lee Konitz and Stan Getz, The New Sounds (Prestige, 1951)[10"]
- 1949–50: Subconscious-Lee (Prestige, 1955) – a.k.a. Lee Konitz with Tristano, Marsh and Bauer
- 1951: The New Sounds featuring Miles Davis (Prestige)[10"] - reissued on Conception in 1956
- 1953: Lee Konitz Plays with the Gerry Mulligan Quartet with Gerry Mulligan (Pacific Jazz, 1957)
- 1953: Lee Konitz Plays (Disques Vogue, 1953)[10"]
- 1954: Lee Konitz at Storyville (Storyville, 1954) – live
- 1954: Konitz (Storyville, 1954)
- 1954: Lee Konitz in Harvard Square (Storyville, 1955)
- 1955: Lee Konitz with Warne Marsh (Atlantic, 1955)
- 1956: Lee Konitz featuring Hans Koller, Lars Gullin, Roland Kovac (Swingtime, 1989)
- 1956: Inside Hi-Fi (Atlantic, 1956)
- 1957: The Real Lee Konitz (Atlantic, 1957) – live
- 1957: Very Cool (Verve, 1957)
- 1957: Tranquility (Verve, 1957)
- 1958: An Image: Lee Konitz with Strings (Verve, 1958)
- 1959: Live at the Half Note (Verve, 1994) – live
- 1959: Lee Konitz Meets Jimmy Giuffre with Jimmy Giuffre (Verve, 1959)
- 1959: You and Lee (Verve, 1959)
- 1961: Motion (Verve, 1961)
- 1966.02 - Modern Jazz Compositions from Haiti (Impulse!, 1979)
- 1967: The Lee Konitz Duets (Milestone, 1968)
- 1968: Alto Summit with Pony Poindexter et al. (MPS, 1968)
- 1968: European Episode (Campi, 1968)
- 1968: Impressive Rome with Martial Solal (Campi, 1968)
- 1968: Stereokonitz (RCA, 1968)
- 1969: Peacemeal (Milestone, 1970)
- 1971: Spirits (Milestone, 1971)
- 1973: Altissimo with Gary Bartz, Jackie McLean and Charlie Mariano (Philips, 1973)
- 1974: In Concert with Chet Baker (India Navigation, 1982) – live
- 1974: Jazz à Juan (SteepleChase, 1977) – live
- 1974: I Concentrate on You: A Tribute to Cole Porter with Red Mitchell (SteepleChase, 1974)
- 1974: Lone-Lee (SteepleChase, 1975)
- 1974: Satori (Milestone, 1975)
- 1975: Oleo (Sonet, 1975)
- 1975: Chicago 'n All That Jazz (Groove Merchant, 1975)
- 1975: Windows with Hal Galper (SteepleChase, 1976)
- 1975: Warne Marsh Quintet: Jazz Exchange Vol. 1 with Warne Marsh (Storyville, 1976) – live
- 1975: Live at the Montmartre Club: Jazz Exchange Vol. 2 with Warne Marsh (Storyville, 1977) – live
- 1975: Warne Marsh Lee Konitz: Jazz Exchange Vol. 3 with Warne Marsh (Storyville, 1985) – live
- 1975: The Unissued 1975 Copenhagen Studio Recordings (Storyville, 1997)
- 1976: Jazz a Confronto 32 (Horo, 1976)
- 1976: Lee Konitz Meets Warne Marsh Again with Warne Marsh (Pausa, 1977) – live
- 1976: The Lee Konitz Nonet (Roulette, 1977)
- 1976: Figure & Spirit (Progressive, 1977)
- 1977: Pyramid with Paul Bley and Bill Connor (Improvising Artists, 1978)
- 1977: The Lee Konitz Quintet (Chiaroscuro, 1977)
- 1977: Lee Konitz Nonet (Chiaroscuro, 1977)
- 1977: French Concert with the Shelly Manne Quartet (Galaxy, 1979) – live
- 1977: Duplicity with Martial Solal (Horo, 1978)
- 1977–78: Tenorlee (Choice, 1978)
- 1979: Yes, Yes, Nonet (SteepleChase, 1979)
- 1979: Four Keys with Martial Solal et al. (MPS, 1979)
- 1979: Live at Laren (Soul Note, 1984) – live
- 1979: Seasons Change with Karl Berger (Circle, 1980)
- 1980: Heroes with Gil Evans (Verve, 1991)
- 1980: Anti-Heroes with Gil Evans (Verve, 1991)
- 1980: Live at the Berlin Jazz Days 1980 with Martial Solal (MPS, 1982) – live
- 1981: Live in Genoa 1981 with Art Farmer (Tramonti, 2013) – live
- 1982: High Jingo with His West Coast Friends (Atlas, 1982)
- 1982: Toot Sweet with Michael Petrucciani (Owl, 1982) – live
- 1983: Dovetail (Sunnyside, 1983)
- 1983: Art of the Duo with Albert Mangelsdorff (Enja, 1988)
- 1983: Glad, Koonix! (Dragon, 1986) – live
- 1983: Dedicated to Lee with Lars Sjösten Octet (Dragon, 1984)
- 1983: Star Eyes, Hamburg 1983 with Martial Solal (HatOLOGY, 1998) – live
- 1984: Wild as Springtime featuring Harold Danko (GFM, 1997)
- 1986?: Medium Rare (Label Bleu, 1986)
- 1986: Ideal Scene (Soul Note, 1986)
- 1987: Anniversary! (EmArcy, 1989) – live
- 1987: The New York Album (Soul Note, 1988)
- 1988: Blew with The Space Jazz Trio (Philology, 1989)
- 1988: Solitudes with Enrico Pieranunzi (Philology, 1988)
- 1988: Round and Round (Musicmasters, 1988)
- 1989?: In Rio (MA, 1989)
- 1989: Konitz in Denmark with Jens Søndergaard Quartet (Rightone, 1989)
- 1988-89: Frank-Lee Speaking (West Wind, 1992)
- 1990: S'Nice with Frank Wunsch (Nabel, 1990)
- 1990: Zounds (Soul Note, 1991)
- 1990: Once Upon a Line (Musidisc, 1995) – live
- 1990: Swiss Kiss with Alain Guyonnet Tentet (TCB, 1994)
- 1991: Lullaby of Birdland (Candid, 1994) – live
- 1988-92: Saxophone Dreams with Netherlands Metropole Orchestra (Koch Jazz, 1997)
- 1992: Lunasea with Peggy Stern (Soul Note, 1992)
- 1992: Unleemited with Kenny Werner (Owl, 1994)
- 1992: Leewise with the Jazzpar All Star Nonet (Storyville, 1993)
- 1992: Steps Towards a Dream with John Pål Inderberg (Odin, 1995)
- 1992: Jazz Nocturne (Evidence, 1994)
- 1992: Lee Konitz Meets Don Friedman with Don Friedman (Insights, 1994)
- 1992: So Many Stars with Tiziana Ghiglioni and Stefano Battaglia (Philology, 1993)
- 1993: The Jobim Collection with Peggy Stern (Philology, 1993)
- 1993: Very Fool with Massimo Salvagnini Quartet (High Tide, 2001)
- 1993: A Venezia with Orchestra Il Suono Improvviso (Philology, 1993)
- 1993: Free with Lee (Philology, 1995)
- 1993: Italian Ballads, Volume 1 with Stefano Battaglia (Philology, 1993)
- 1993: Speakin' Lowly with Renato Sellani (Philology, 1994)
- 1993: All the Way (The Soft Way) with Renato Sellani (Philology, 1998)
- 1993: Rhapsody (Evidence, 1993)
- 1993: Rhapsody II (Evidence, 1994)
- 1994: We Thought About Duke with Franz Koglmann (HatART, 1995)
- 1994: Haiku with Rudi Mahall et al. (Nabel, 1995)
- 1995?: Live at the Manhattan Jazz Club with Jeanfrançois Prins Trio (GAM Records, 1995) – live
- 1995: Brazilian Rhapsody (Venus, 1995)
- 1995: Breaths and Whispers with Umberto Petrin (Philology, 1995)
- 1995: Thingin' with Don Friedman and Attila Zoller (HatOLOGY, 1996) – live
- 1995: The Frankfurt Concert with Frank Wunsch (West Wind, 1997)
- 1996: It's You (SteepleChase, 1996)
- 1996: Strings for Holiday: A Tribute to Billie Holiday (Enja, 1996)
- 1996: Inside Cole Porter (Philology, 1998)
- 1996: Inside Rogers with Franco D'Andrea (Philology, 1998)
- 1996: Body and Soul with Gary Foster (Camerata, 1996)
- 1996: Dearly Beloved (SteepleChase, 1996)
- 1996: Unaccompanied Live in Yokohama (P.S.F., 1997) – live
- 1996: Alone Together with Brad Mehldau and Charlie Haden (Blue Note, 1997) – live
- 1996: Subconscious-Lee with Johannes Schaedlich (Summit, 1998)
- 1997: Self Portrait (Philology, 1998)
- 1997: L'Age Mur with Enrico Rava (Philology, 1998)
- 1997: Dig Dug Dog (Columbia, 1997)
- 1997: Out of Nowhere with Paul Bley (SteepleChase, 1998)
- 1997: RichLee! with Rich Perry (SteepleChase, 1998)
- 1997: Dialogues with Bert Van Den Brink Trio (Challenge, 1998)
- 1997: Another Shade of Blue (Blue Note, 1999) – live
- 1998: Three Guys with Steve Swallow and Paul Motian (Enja, 1999)
- 1998: Tender Lee (For Chet) (Philology, 1999)
- 1999: Sound of Surprise (RCA Victor, 1999)
- 1999: Dig-It with Ted Brown (SteepleChase, 1999)
- 1999: Pride (SteepleChase, 1999)
- 1999: Live at Birdland Neuberg with Kenny Wheeler Quartet (Double Moon, 2000) – live
- 2000: Play French Impressionist Music from the Turn of the 20th Century with the Axis String Quartet (Palmetto, 2000)
- 2000: Some New Stuff (DIW, 2000)
- 2000: In Italy Vol.3: Lee Konitz at the New Mississippi Jazz Club (Philology, 2002) – live
- 2000: Live-Lee with Alan Broadbent (Milestone, 2004) – live
- 2000: More Live-Lee with Alan Broadbent (Milestone, 2004) – live
- 2000: Prisma (QFTF, 2018) – live
- 2000: Parallels (Chesky, 2001)
- 2001: In Italy Vol.1: Duas Contas with Irio de Paula (Philology, 2002)
- 2001: In Italy Vol.2: Outra vez with Barbara Casini (Philology, 2002)
- 2002: In Italy Vol.4: Suite For Paolo with Stefano Bollani (Philology, 2003)
- 2002: A Day in Florence with Roberto Gatto (Philology, 2003)
- 2003: BargaLee with the Orchestra BargaJazz (Philology, 2013) – live
- 2004: Lee Konitz - Ohad Talmor String Project, Inventions with Ohad Talmor et al. (OmniTone, 2006)
- 2005: New Nonet (OmniTone, 2006) – live
- 2006: Organic-Lee with Gary Versace (SteepleChase, 2006)
- 2006: Lee Konitz - Ohad Talmor Big Band, Portology with Ohad Talmor et al. (OmniTone, 2007)
- 2006: Infant eyes: The Music of Wayne Shorter with Claudio Fasoli et al. (Philology, 2007)
- 2007: Deep Lee with Minsarah (Enja, 2008)
- 2008?: GRACEfulLEE with Grace Kelly (Pazz, 2008)
- 2008-09: Duos with Lee with Dan Tepfer (Sunnyside, 2009)
- 2009.03 -Lee Konitz New Quartet, Live at the Village Vanguard (Enja, 2010) – live
- 2009.12 - Live at Birdland with Brad Mehldau, Charlie Haden and Paul Motian (ECM, 2011) – live
- 2010 - First Meeting: Live in London, Volume 1 with Dan Tepfer, Michael Janisch and Jeff Williams (Whirlwind, 2014) – live
- 2012.08 - Enfants Terribles with Bill Frisell, Gary Peacock and Joey Baron (HighNote, 2012) – live
- 2012.08 -Costumes Are Mandatory with Ethan Iverson, Larry Grenadier and Jorge Rossy (HighNote, 2013)
- 2015.11 - Frescalalto with Kenny Barron, Peter Washington and Kenny Washington (Impulse!, 2017)
- 2015.10 – Dan Tepfer, Decade – Verve (2018)
- 2008.03 - Jakob Bro, Balladeering – Loveland (2009)
- 2009.02 - Dan Tepfer, Duos with Lee – Sunnyside (2009)
- 2010.04 - Marcel·lí Bayer, Nonitz Featuring Lee Konitz – Quadrant (2013)
- 2011.04 – Jakob Bro, Time – Loveland (2011)
- 2012.02 – Jakob Bro, December Song – Loveland (2013)
- 2014.05 – Jakob Bro, Taking Turns – ECM (2024)

=== Compilation ===
- From Newport to Nice (Philology, 1992)
- Sound-Lee (Membran, 2004)

=== As sideman ===
- 1947.05 - Claude Thornhill, The Uncollected Claude Thornhill and His Orchestra – Hindsight (1994) (and His Orchestra)
- 1947.09 - Miles Davis, Lennie Tristano, Why Do I Love You? Rare Broadcasts 1947–48 – Natasha (1993) (Tuba Band)
- 1947.10 - Stan Kenton, City of Glass – Capitol (1951)
- 1949.03 - Lennie Tristano, Crosscurrents – Capitol (1972)
- 1949.04 - Miles Davis, Birth of the Cool – Capitol (1957) (1989 CD – Capitol / 2019 – Capitol)
- 1951.08 - Ralph Burns, Free Forms – Mercury (1951) (and His Orchestra)
- 1947-51 - City of Glass (Capitol, 1951)
- 1952.09 - Stan Kenton, New Concepts of Artistry in Rhythm (Capitol, 1953) (1989 – Capitol)
- 1951-53 - Stan Kenton, This Modern World (Capitol, 1953)
- 1953 - Stan Kenton, Sketches on Standards (Capitol, 1953)
- 1953 - Stan Kenton, Portraits on Standards (Capitol, 1953)
- 1954.06 - Lennie Tristano, Lennie Tristano – Atlantic (1956) (1985 – Atlantic / 1991 – Atlantic)
- 1956.03 - Metronome All-Stars, Metronome All-Stars 1956 - Clef (1956)
- 1957.05 - Miles Davis, Miles Ahead – Columbia (1957) (rist. 1987 CD – Columbia / 2017 LP – Columbia)
- 1957.09 - Gil Evans, Gil Evans & Ten – Prestige (1958) (rist. 1987 CD – OJC)
- 1957.12 - Gerry Mulligan, The Gerry Mulligan Songbook – World Pacific (1958) (rist. 1996 CD – Pacific Jazz)
- 1966.11 - Dave Pike, The Doors of Perception – Vortex (1970)
- 1968.03 - Attila Zoller, Zo-Ko-Ma – MPS (1968) (rist. 1994 CD – MPS)
- 1972.02 - Charles Mingus, Charles Mingus and Friends in Concert – Columbia (1972) (rist. 1993 CD – Columbia)
- 1973.10 - Dave Brubeck, All The Things We Are – Atlantic (1976) (rist. 1992 CD – Atlantic)
- 1974.10 - Andrew Hill, Spiral – Arista (1975)
- 1975.02 - Hal Galper, Windows – SteepleChase (1976) (rist. 1994 CD – SteepleChase)
- 1977.02 - Bill Evans, Crosscurrents – Fantasy (1978) (1990 – Fantasy OJC)
- 1981.09 - Chick Corea, Woodstock Jazz Festival 1 – Douglas Music (1997)
- 1981.09 - Chick Corea, Woodstock Jazz Festival 2 – Douglas Music (1997)
- 1984.08 - Max Roach, It's Christmas Again – Soul Note (1984)
- 1990.02 - Frank Wunsch, S'Nice – Nabel (1990) (Quartet)
- 1991.03 - Lars Sjosten, Friends – Dragon (1992) (Quartet)
- 1993.04 - Orchestra Il Suono Improvviso, A Venezia – Philology (1993)
- 1995.03 - Umberto Petrin, Breaths and Whispers (Homage to Alexander Scriabin) – Philology (1995)
- 1995.04 - John Pål Inderberg, Step Towards a Dream – Odin (1997)
- 1995.08 - Don Friedman, Attila Zoller, Thingin' – HatOLOGY (2000)
- 1996.01 - Franco D'Andrea, Inside Rodgers – Philology (1998)
- 1996.02 - Kenny Wheeler, Angel Song – ECM (1997)
- 1997.02 - Rich Perry, RichLee! – SteepleChase (1998)
- 1998.01 - Gerry Mulligan All-Star Tribute Band, Thank You, Gerry! – Arkadia Jazz (1998)
- 1998.03 - Diane Hubka, Haven't We Met? – Challenge (1998)
- 1999.02 - Jeanfrançois Prins, All Around Town – TCB (1999)
- 2000.03 - Brandenburg State Orchestra, Prisma – QFTF (2018)
- 2000.05 - The Axis Quartet, Play French Impressionist Music from the Turn of the Twentieth Century – Palmetto (2000)
- 2002.01 - Judy Niemack, About Time – Sony Jazz (2002)
- 2002.04 - Matt Wilson, Gong with Wind Suite – SteepleChase (2002)
- 2005.02 - Riccardo Arrighini, The Soprano Sax Album: Standards – Philology (2006)
- 2005.05 - Brian Dickenson, The Glenn Gould Session – Philology (2006)
- 2006.03 - Francois Théberge, Soliloque – Effendi (2008)

Antologies Box Set

- 1947.10 – The Dedication Series/Vol.VIII The New Breed – ABC Records (1978)
- 1951.01 – Popular Favorites by Stan Kenton – Capitol (1953)
- 1951.01 – New Music: Second Wave – Savoy (1979)
- 1953.01 – The Kenton Era – Capitol (1955)
- 1978.11 – Invitation to Denon/PCM Digital Jazz – Denon (1979)

With Warne Marsh

- 1959: The Art of Improvising (Revelation, 1974) – live
- 1975: Jazz Exchange (Storyville, 1976) – live

With Renato Sellani

- 1993: Vol. 1: Speakin' Lowly (Philology, 1994)
- 1993: Vol. 2: Minority (All The Way) (Philology, 1998)

With Martial Solal

- 1980: Live at the Berlin Jazz Days (MPS, 1982) – live
- 1983: Star Eyes, Hamburg 1983 (HatOLOGY, 1998) – live

With Lennie Tristano

- 1954-55: Lennie Tristano (Atlantic, 1956)
- 1949: Crosscurrents (Capitol, 1972) – reissued as part of Intuition (1996)

With Kenny Werner

- 1992: Unleemited (Owl, 1994)

With others

- 1947: Claude Thornhill and His Orchestra, The Uncollected Claude Thornhill and His Orchestra (Hindsight, 1994)
- 1951: Ralph Burns and His Orchestra, Free Forms (1951, Mercury)[10" SP]
- 1956: Metronome All-Stars, Metronome All-Stars 1956 (Clef, 1956)
- 1957: Gil Evans, Gil Evans & Ten (Prestige, 1958)
- 1957: Gerry Mulligan, The Gerry Mulligan Songbook (World Pacific, 1958)
- 1966: Dave Pike, The Doors of Perception (Vortex, 1970) – live
- 1968: Attila Zoller, Zo-Ko-Ma (MPS, 1968)
- 1972: Charles Mingus, Charles Mingus and Friends in Concert (Columbia, 1972) – live
- 1973-74: Dave Brubeck, All The Things We Are (Atlantic, 1976)
- 1974-75: Andrew Hill, Spiral (Arista, 1975)
- 1975: Hal Galper, Windows (SteepleChase, 1976)
- 1977: Bill Evans, Crosscurrents (Fantasy, 1978)
- 1984: Max Roach, It's Christmas Again (Soul Note, 1984)
- 1990: Frank Wunsch Quartet, S'Nice (Nabel, 1990)
- 1991: Lars Sjosten Quartet, Friends (Dragon, 1992)
- 1993: Orchestra Il Suono Improvviso, A Venezia (Philology, 1993)
- 1995: Umberto Petrin, Breaths and Whispers (Homage to Alexander Scriabin) (Philology, 1995)
- 1995: John Pl Indreberg, Step Towards a Dream (Odin, 1997)
- 1995: Don Friedman with Attila Zoller, Thingin' (HatOLOGY, 2000)
- 1996: Franco D'Andrea, Inside Rodgers (Philology, 1998)
- 1996: Kenny Wheeler, Angel Song (ECM, 1997)
- 1997: Rich Perry, RichLee! (SteepleChase, 1998)
- 1998?: Gerry Mulligan All-Star Tribute Band, Thank You, Gerry! (Arkadia Jazz, 1998) – tribute
- 1998?: Diane Hubka, Haven't We Met? (Challenge, 1998)
- 1999?: Jeanfrançois Prins, All Around Town (TCB, 1999)
- 2000: Brandenburg State Orchestra, Prisma - composed by Guenter Buhles (QFTF, 2018)
- 2000?: The Axis Quartet, Play French Impressionist Music from the Turn of the Twentieth Century (Palmetto, 2000)
- 2002?: Judy Niemack, About Time (SONY Jazz, 2002)
- 2002: Matt Wilson, Gong with Wind Suite (SteepleChase, 2002)
- 2005: Riccardo Arrighini, The Soprano Sax Album: Standards (Philology, 2006)
- 2005: Brian Dickenson, The Glenn Gould Session (Philology, 2006)
- 2006: Francois Théberge, Soliloque (Effendi, 2008)
- 2009?: Dan Tepfer, Duos with Lee (Sunnyside, 2009)
- 2010?: Marcel·lí Bayer, Nonitz Featuring Lee Konitz (Quadrant, 2013)
- 2015-16: Dan Tepfer, Decade (Verve, 2018)
