= Phil Woods and his European Rhythm Machine at the Montreux Jazz Festival =

Live album by Phil Woods
- Released: 1970
- Recorded: June 19, 1969
- Venue: The Montreux Jazz Festival
- Genre: Jazz
- Length: 35:37
- Label: MGM SE 4695
- Producer: Johnny Pate

Phil Woods chronology
Phil Woods and his European Rhythm Machine at the Frankfurt Jazz Festival (1970)	Phil Woods and his European Rhythm Machine at the Montreux Jazz Festival (1970)	New Music by the New Phil Woods Quartet (1970)

Phil Woods and his European Rhythm Machine at the Montreux Jazz Festival is a 1970 album by Phil Woods, produced by Johnny Pate.

== Reception ==
Professional ratings
Review scores
Source	Rating
Allmusic	3/5 stars
The Penguin Guide to Jazz Recordings	3/4 stars

Scott Yanow reviewed the album for Allmusic and wrote that Woods' European Rhythm Machine was "an adventurous unit that really challenged the altoist" and "one of the most underrated groups of the 1968-70 period". Yanow concluded that "It is very good to hear Phil Woods playing post-bop and almost avant-garde music for a change, but it is a pity that all of the intriguing group's recordings are currently out of print".

== Track listing ==
1. "Capricci Cavaleschi" (George Gruntz) – 9:50
2. "I Remember Bird" (Leonard Feather) – 10:15
3. "Ad Infinitum" (Carla Bley) – 10:20
4. "Riot" (Herbie Hancock) – 5:12

== Personnel ==
- Phil Woods – alto saxophone
- George Gruntz – piano
- Henri Texier – double bass
- Daniel Humair – drums
- Johnny Pate – producer
