= Musique du Bois =

Studio album by Phil Woods
- Released: 1974
- Recorded: January 14, 1974
- Studio: New York City
- Genre: Jazz
- Length: 54:34
- Label: Muse
- Producer: Joel Dorn, Don Schlitten

Phil Woods chronology
New Phil Woods Quartet (1973)	Musique du Bois (1974)	Images (1975)

Musique du Bois is a 1974 studio album by jazz musician Phil Woods. It was released by Muse Records and reissued by 32 Jazz and Pony Canyon.

== Critical reception ==
Professional ratings
Review scores
Source	Rating
Allmusic	4.5/5 stars
The Rolling Stone Jazz Record Guide	4/5 stars

Musique du Bois has been critically well received, and it is regarded as among the best of Woods' releases. In Profiles in Jazz, Raymond Horricks says of the album and Woods that "from first to last it provides a continuous example of the fertility of his imagination". The book Jazz Matters, naming Woods as "one of the most impressive" of Charlie Parker's "disciples", says "[n]owhere is he more impressive" than on this album, where he "soars over the perfect rhythm section...with a freedom that makes one wonder if this is what Parker would sound like today". Allmusic indicates that the album is "a widely acknowledged modern jazz masterpiece, a classic in the discography of Woods, easily amongst the best five recordings of his long and storied career".

== Music ==
Horricks mentions that "[i]t doesn't matter how randomly one chooses an individual track... the fact remains that the buckets brought up from his private artesian well of the mind are in an inexhaustible chain". Nevertheless, Horricks focuses on the track "The Last Page", which he describes as "an unfolding tour de force of smooth wonder". National Public Radio singled out the "haunting" song "The Summer Knows", indicating that "Woods explores all of its melodic possibilities" with the help of Jaki Byard, "one of the most compelling and versatile pianists in jazz". The Byard-Davis-Dawson rhythm section (compared to Herbie Hancock-Ron Carter-Tony Williams) was also employed by a tenor saxophonist who had his own style, Booker Ervin, for a few albums.

== Track listing ==
1. "Samba du Bois" (Woods) – 6:58
2. "Willow Weep for Me" (Ann Ronell) – 10:07
3. "Nefertiti" (Wayne Shorter) – 8:23
4. "The Last Page" (Woods) – 9:06
5. "The Summer Knows" (Alan and Marilyn Bergman, Michel Legrand) – 7:15
6. "Airegin" (Sonny Rollins) – 5:57
7. "Samba du Bois" (Woods) – 6:14 (CD bonus track not on original vinyl edition)

== Personnel ==
- Phil Woods – clarinet, alto saxophone
- Jaki Byard – piano
- Richard Davis – double bass
- Alan Dawson – drums

Production

- Joel Dorn – producer
- Nancy Dwyer – graphic design
- Paul Goodman – engineer
- Gene Paul – mastering
- Doug Ramsey – liner notes
- Don Schlitten – producer
- Page Simon – graphic design
- Oliver Wasow – illustrations
- Michael Weiner – production coordination
