= Satori (Lee Konitz album) =

Studio album by Lee Konitz
- Released: 1975
- Recorded: September 30, 1974
- Studio: CI Recording, New York City
- Genre: Jazz
- Length: 43:09
- Label: Milestone; MSP 9060
- Producer: Dick Katz

Lee Konitz chronology
Lone-Lee (1974)	Satori (1975)	Oleo (1975)

Professional ratings
Review scores
Source	Rating
Allmusic	link
The Rolling Stone Jazz Record Guide	5/5 stars
The Penguin Guide to Jazz Recordings	4/4 stars

Satori is a jazz album by saxophonist Lee Konitz. It was originally released in 1975 on Milestone label as MSP 9060 and remastered in 1997. The album features some classic jazz standards besides other experimental compositions such as "Satori". Three of the seven tracks are Konitz compositions.

== Track listing ==
1. "Just Friends" (John Klenner/Sam M. Lewis) – 7:02
2. "On Green Dolphin Street" (Bronisław Kaper/Ned Washington) – 5:44
3. "Satori" (Konitz/Holland/Katz/DeJohnette/Solal) – 9:04
4. "Sometime Ago" (Sergio Mihanovich) – 7:20
5. "What's New"(Bob Haggart) – 3:24
6. "Hymn" (Konitz) – 2:45
7. "Free Blues" (Konitz) – 7:50

== Personnel ==
- Lee Konitz – alto sax, soprano sax (tracks 3, 4 & 7), tenor sax (tracks 3 and 5)
- Martial Solal – piano, electric piano (track 4)
- Dick Katz – electric piano (track 3)
- Dave Holland – bass
- Jack DeJohnette – drums
