= Star Eyes, Hamburg 1983 =

Live album by Lee Konitz and Martial Solal
- Released: 1998
- Recorded: November 11, 1983
- Venue: New-Jazz-Festival, Fabrik, Hamburg, Germany
- Genre: Jazz
- Length: 67:40
- Label: HatOLOGY; 518
- Producer: Werner X. Uehlinger

Lee Konitz chronology
Dedicated to Lee (1983)	Star Eyes, Hamburg 1983 (1998)	Wild as Springtime (1984)

Martial Solal chronology
Bluesine (1983)	Star Eyes, Hamburg 1983 (1983)	Martial Solal et Son Ochestre Jouent André Hodeir (1984)

Star Eyes, Hamburg 1983 is a live album by saxophonist Lee Konitz and pianist Martial Solal which was recorded in Germany in 1983 by Norddeutscher Rundfunk and released on the HatOLOGY label in 1998.

== Critical reception ==
Professional ratings
Review scores
Source	Rating
Allmusic	4.5/5 stars
The Penguin Guide to Jazz Recordings	4/4 stars

The Allmusic review stated "there is no date, with possible exceptions of Motion and Lone-Lee, that can touch this live duet setting for breaking new ground. Given his apprenticeship with Lennie Tristano, Konitz is well known for his melodic improvising and his ability to re-conceptualize a tune. But what happens here, with Martial Solal's dramatic, often theatrical style of piano playing, is the extension of Konitz's own abilities to visualize inherently what is possible within a given framework ... It's quite honestly the finest live recording of Lee Konitz that exists". On All About Jazz C. Michael Bailey noted "What Solal gave Konitz on this recording was freedom, a mental and creative elasticity that the saxophonist could use as a springboard for improvisation beyond the normal harmonic coloring within-the- lines. This music is perfect for the probing jazz enthusiast who cannot make sense of late Coltrane or fellow saxophonist Eric Dolphy. There is enough of the melody retained to see where the artists are going and appreciate them for it".

== Track listing ==
All compositions by Lee Konitz except where noted.

1. "Just Friends" (John Klenner, Sam M. Lewis) - 7:43
2. "Star Eyes" (Gene de Paul, Don Raye) - 7:12
3. "It's You" - 6:22
4. "Body and Soul" (Johnny Green, Frank Eyton, Edward Heyman, Robert Sour) - 9:02
5. "Subconscious Lee" - 7:33
6. "Fluctuat Nec Mergitur" (Martial Solal) - 6:21
7. "April" - 7:18
8. "What's New?" (Bob Haggart, Johnny Burke) - 10:21
9. "Cherokee" (Ray Noble) - 5:45

== Personnel ==
- Lee Konitz – alto saxophone
- Martial Solal – piano
