= Bluesine =

Studio album by Martial Solal
- Released: 1983
- Recorded: January 18–19, 1983
- Studio: Barigozzi Studio, Milano
- Genre: Jazz
- Length: 37:09
- Label: Soul Note; SN 1060
- Producer: Giovanni Bonandrini

Martial Solal chronology
Live at the Berlin Jazz Days 1980 (1980)	Bluesine (1983)	Star Eyes, Hamburg 1983 (1983)

Bluesine is a solo album by pianist Martial Solal recorded in Milan in 1983 and released on the Soul Note label.

== Critical reception ==
Professional ratings
Review scores
Source	Rating
AllMusic	4.5/5 stars
The Penguin Guide to Jazz	3.5/4 stars

Ken Dryden of AllMusic said "This solo piano affair by Martial Solal dates from early 1983, mixing striking interpretations of standards and familiar jazz compositions along with his own stunning originals".

== Track listing ==
All compositions by Martial Solal except where noted.

1. "The End of a Love Affair" (Edward C. Redding) – 5:11
2. "Bluesine" – 2:55
3. "Lover" (Richard Rodgers, Lorenz Hart) – 3:54
4. "I'll Remember April" (Gene de Paul, Patricia Johnston, Don Raye) – 5:40
5. "Moins de 36" – 2:47
6. "'Round About Midnight" (Thelonious Monk, Cootie Williams) – 6:00
7. "Yardbird Suite" (Charlie Parker) – 3:02
8. "14 Septembre" – 4:00
9. "Have You Met Miss Jones?" (Rogers, Hart) – 3:40

== Personnel ==
- Martial Solal – piano
