= Phil Woods =

American jazz musician (1931–2015)

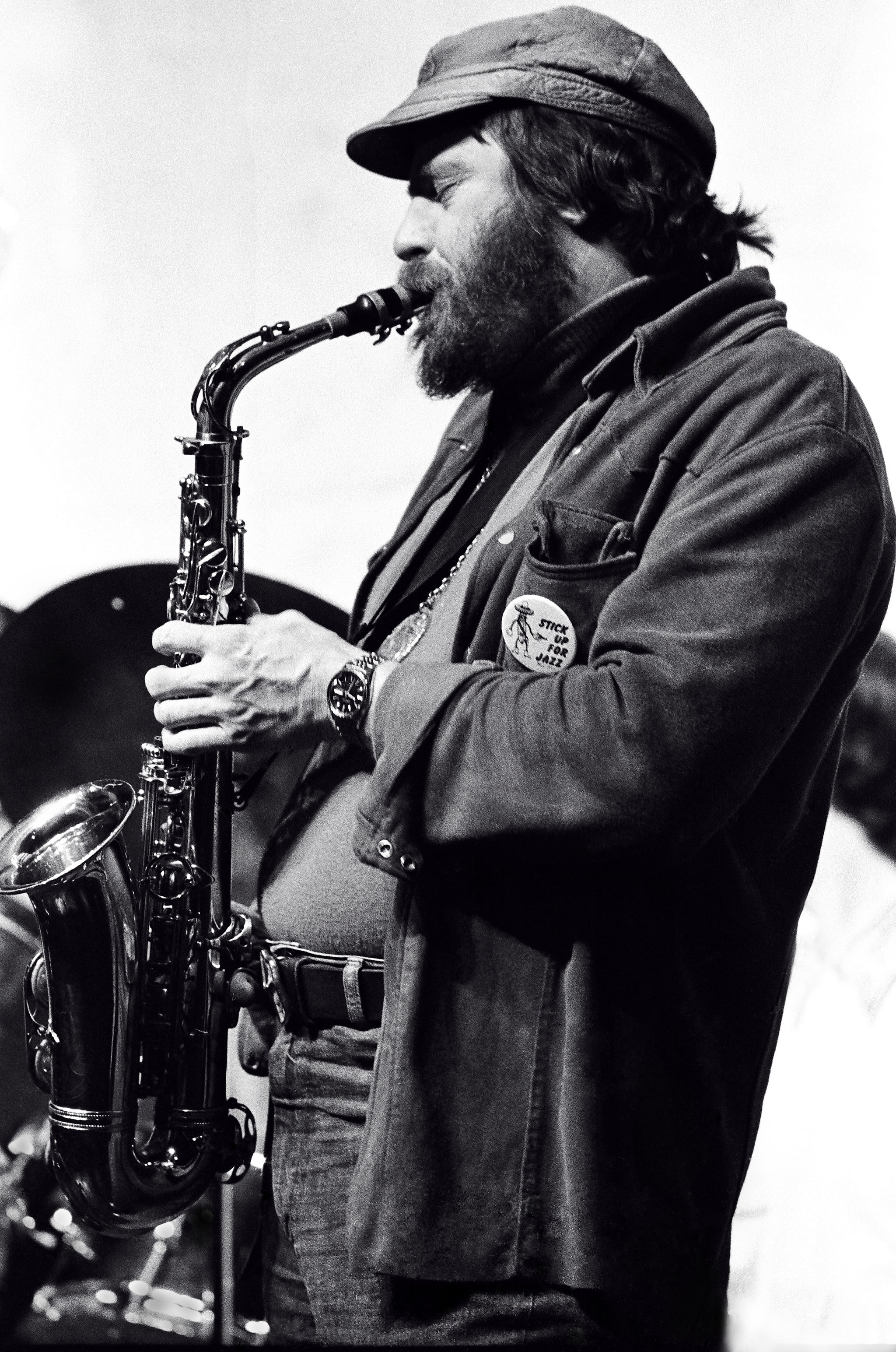
- Woods in 1978

Background information
- Born: Philip Wells Woods; November 2, 1931; Springfield, Massachusetts, U.S.
- Died: September 29, 2015 (aged 83) East Stroudsburg, Pennsylvania, U.S.
- Genres: Jazz
- Occupations: Musician, composer
- Instruments: Alto saxophone, clarinet

Philip Wells Woods (November 2, 1931 – September 29, 2015) was an American jazz alto saxophonist, clarinetist, bandleader, and composer.

== Biography ==
Woods was born in Springfield, Massachusetts. After inheriting a saxophone at age 12, he began taking lessons from Harvey LaRose at a local music shop. His heroes on the alto saxophone included Benny Carter and Johnny Hodges. He studied music with Lennie Tristano at the Manhattan School of Music and at the Juilliard School. His friend, Joe Lopes, coached him on clarinet as there was no saxophone major at Juilliard at the time and received a bachelor’s degree in 1952. Although he did not copy Charlie Parker, Woods was known as the New Bird, a nickname also given to other alto saxophone players such as Sonny Stitt and Cannonball Adderley.

In the 1950s, Woods began to lead his own bands. Quincy Jones invited him to accompany Dizzy Gillespie on a world tour sponsored by the U.S. State Department. A few years later he toured Europe with Jones, and in 1962 he toured Russia with Benny Goodman.

After moving to France in 1968, Woods led the European Rhythm Machine, which tended toward avant-garde jazz. He returned to the United States in 1972 and, after an unsuccessful attempt to establish an electronic group, he formed a quintet, which was still performing, with some changes of personnel, in 2004. As his theme, Woods used a piece titled "How's Your Mama?"

Woods earned the top alto sax player award almost 30 times in DownBeat magazine's annual readers' poll. His quintet was awarded the top small combo title several times.

In 1979, Woods recorded the album More Live at Armadillo World Headquarters in Austin, Texas. His best known recorded work as a sideman is a pop piece, his alto sax solo on Billy Joel's 1977 "Just the Way You Are". He also played the alto sax solo on Steely Dan's "Doctor Wu" from their 1975 album Katy Lied, as well as Paul Simon's "Have a Good Time" from the 1975 album Still Crazy After All These Years.

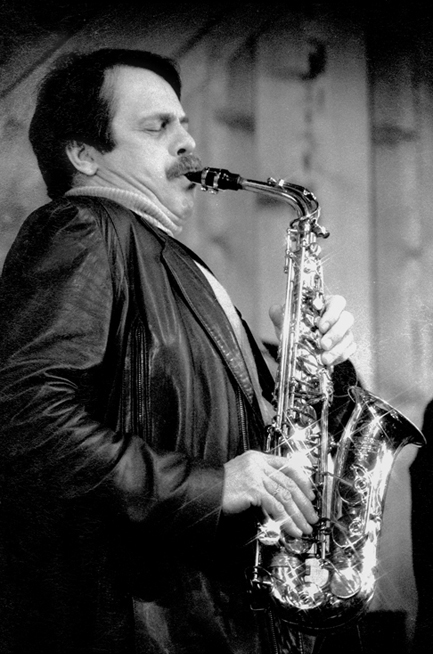
Woods in 1983

Although Woods was primarily a saxophonist, he was also a clarinet player, and solos are scattered through his recordings. One example is his clarinet solo on "Misirlou" on the compilation album, Into the Woods.

Woods, along with Rick Chamberlain and Ed Joubert, founded the organization Celebration of the Arts (COTA) in 1978 late one night in the bar at the Deer Head Inn in Delaware Water Gap, Pennsylvania. The organization would eventually become the Delaware Water Gap Celebration of the Arts. Their initial goal was to help foster an appreciation of jazz and its relationship to other artistic disciplines. Each year, the organization hosts the Celebration of the Arts Festival in September.

In 2005, Jazzed Media released the documentary Phil Woods: A Life in E Flat – Portrait of a Jazz Legend, directed by Rich Lerner and produced by Graham Carter.

Woods was married to Chan Parker, the common-law wife of Charlie Parker, for seventeen years and was the stepfather to Chan's daughter, Kim. They divorced in 1973. In 1985, he married Jill Goodwin, the sister of his drummer Bill Goodwin. On September 4, 2015, he performed a tribute to Charlie Parker with Strings at the Manchester Craftsmen's Guild and announced at the end of the show that he would be retiring. He died a little more than three weeks later of emphysema on September 29, 2015, at the age of 83.

== Awards ==
- Grammy Award, Best Large Jazz Ensemble Performance: Images, 1975
- Grammy Award, Best Instrumental Jazz Performance, Individual or Group: Live from the Show Boat (1977), More Live (1982), At the Vanguard (1983)
- NEA Jazz Masters, 2007

== Discography ==
=== As leader/co-leader ===
Recording date	Title / Co-leader	Label	Year released	Notes
1954-10, 1955-02	Pot Pie with Jon Eardley	New Jazz	1963	
1955-05	Woodlore	Prestige	1956	
1956-06	Pairing Off	Prestige	1956	
1956-11	The Young Bloods with Donald Byrd	Prestige	1957	
1957-02	Four Altos with Gene Quill, Hal Stein, Sahib Shihab	Prestige	1957	
1957-03	Phil and Quill with Prestige with Gene Quill	Prestige	1957	
1957-07	Sugan	Status	1965	
1957-09, 1957-10	Warm Woods	Epic	1958	
1961-01, 1961-02	Rights of Swing	Candid	1961	
1967-01, 1967-02	Greek Cooking	Impulse!	1967	
1968-06	Alto Summit with Lee Konitz, Pony Poindexter and Leo Wright	MPS	1968	
1968-11	Alive And Well In Paris	Pathé	1968	
1969-06	Phil Woods and his European Rhythm Machine at the Montreux Jazz Festival	MGM	1970	Live
1969-07	Round Trip	Verve	1969	
1970-03	Phil Woods and his European Rhythm Machine at the Frankfurt Jazz Festival	Embryo	1971	Live
1972-07	Live At Montreux 72	Verve	1972	Live
1973	New Music by the New Phil Woods Quartet	Testament	1974	
1974-01	Musique du Bois	Muse	1974	
1975-02	Images with Michel Legrand	RCA Victor	1975	
1975-07	Phil Woods & The Japanese Rhythm Machine	RCA Victor	1976	Live
1975-10 – 1975-12	The New Phil Woods Album	RCA Victor	1976	
1976-04	Floresta Canto with Chris Gunning Orchestra	RCA	1976	
1976-11	Live from the Show Boat	RCA Victor	1977	[2LP] Live
1977-11	Summer Afternoon Jazz	Hindsight	1978	
1978-03	I Remember	Gryphon	1979	
1978-11	Song for Sisyphus	Century	1978	
1979-05	Phil Woods Quartet Live	Clean Cuts	1980	Live
1979-05	'More' Live	Adelphi	1981	Live
1980-11	European Tour Live	Red	1981	Live
1980-12	Phil Woods/Lew Tabackin with Lew Tabackin	Omnisound	1981	
1981-01	Three for All with Tommy Flanagan and Red Mitchell	Enja	1981	
1981-08	Birds of a Feather	Antilles	1982	
1982-05	Live from New York	Palo Alto	1985	Live
1982-10	At the Vanguard	Antilles	1983	Live
1984-04	Integrity	Red	1985	[2LP] Live
1984?	Piper at the Gates of Dawn with Chris Swansen	Sea Breeze Jazz	1984	
1984-12	Heaven	Evidence	1986	
1986-12	Dizzy Gillespie Meets Phil Woods Quintet with Dizzy Gillespie	Timeless	1987	
1987-11	Bop Stew	Concord	1988	Live
1987-11	Bouquet	Concord	1989	Live
1988-04	Phil's Mood with Space Jazz Trio	Philology	1990	
1988-05	Evolution	Concord	1988	
1988-05	Little Big Band Évolution	Concord	1988	
1988-07	Embracable You	Philology	1989	
1988-10	My Man Benny, My Man Phil with Benny Carter	MusicMasters	1989	
1988-12	Here's to My Lady	Chesky	1989	
1989-04	Flash	Concord	1990	
1990-06	All Bird Children	Concord	1991	
1990-09	Real Life	Chesky	1991	
1991?	Altoist!	Rockin' Chair	1991	
1991-06	Flowers for Hodges	Concord	1991	
1991-09	Full House	Milestone	1992	
1994-06	Just Friends	Philology	1997	
1994-11	Our Monk	Philology	1996	
1995-02	Plays the Music of Jim McNeely	TCB	1996	
1995-03	The Songs Carmen Sang (Carol Sloane with Phil Woods)	Concord Jazz	1995	
1996-03	Another Time, Another Place with Benny Carter	Evening Star	1996	Live
1996-04	Mile High Jazz Live in Denver	Concord	1996	Live
1996-05	The Complete Concert with Gordon Beck	JMS	1996	[2CD] Live
1996-05	Astor and Elis	Chesky	1996	
1997-01	Celebration!	Concord	1997	
1997-10	Chasin' The Bird	Venus	1998	
1998-01	The Rev and I with Johnny Griffin	Blue Note	1998	
1999-01	Cool Woods	somethin' else	1999	
2000-05	Phil Woods In Italy 2000 (Chapter 1–7)	Philology	2001	
2002-06	The Thrill Is Gone	Venus	2003	
2002	American Songbook with Brian Lynch	Kind of Blue	2006	
2003-06?	Beyond Brooklyn with Herbie Mann	Manchester Craftsmen's Guild	2004	Finished weeks before Mann's death. Dedicated to Mann.
2005-06	Bird With Strings ... And More!	Storyville	2023	[2CD] Live
2005-09	The Gershwin Affair with Franco D'Andrea	Philology	2006	
2005-09	Blues For New Orleans with Irio De Paula	Philology	2006	
2007-01	American Songbook II with Brian Lynch	Kind of Blue	2007	
2008-06	Ballads & Blues	Venus	2009	
2009-01	Sing & Play The Phil Woods Songbook (Vol.1 & Vol. 2) with Michela Lombardi	Philology	2010	
2008-02, 2009-05	Solitude with The DePaul University Jazz Ensemble	Jazzed Media	2010	
2010-06	Songs For COTA 2010 with Jesse Green	Philology	2010	
2010-09	Phil & Bill with Bill Mays	Palmetto	2011	
2010?	Man with the Hat with Grace Kelly	Pazz	2011	
2013-04 – 2013-06	New Celebration	Chiaroscuro	2013	
2014-12	Songs One with Vic Juris	Philology	2015	

Compilation

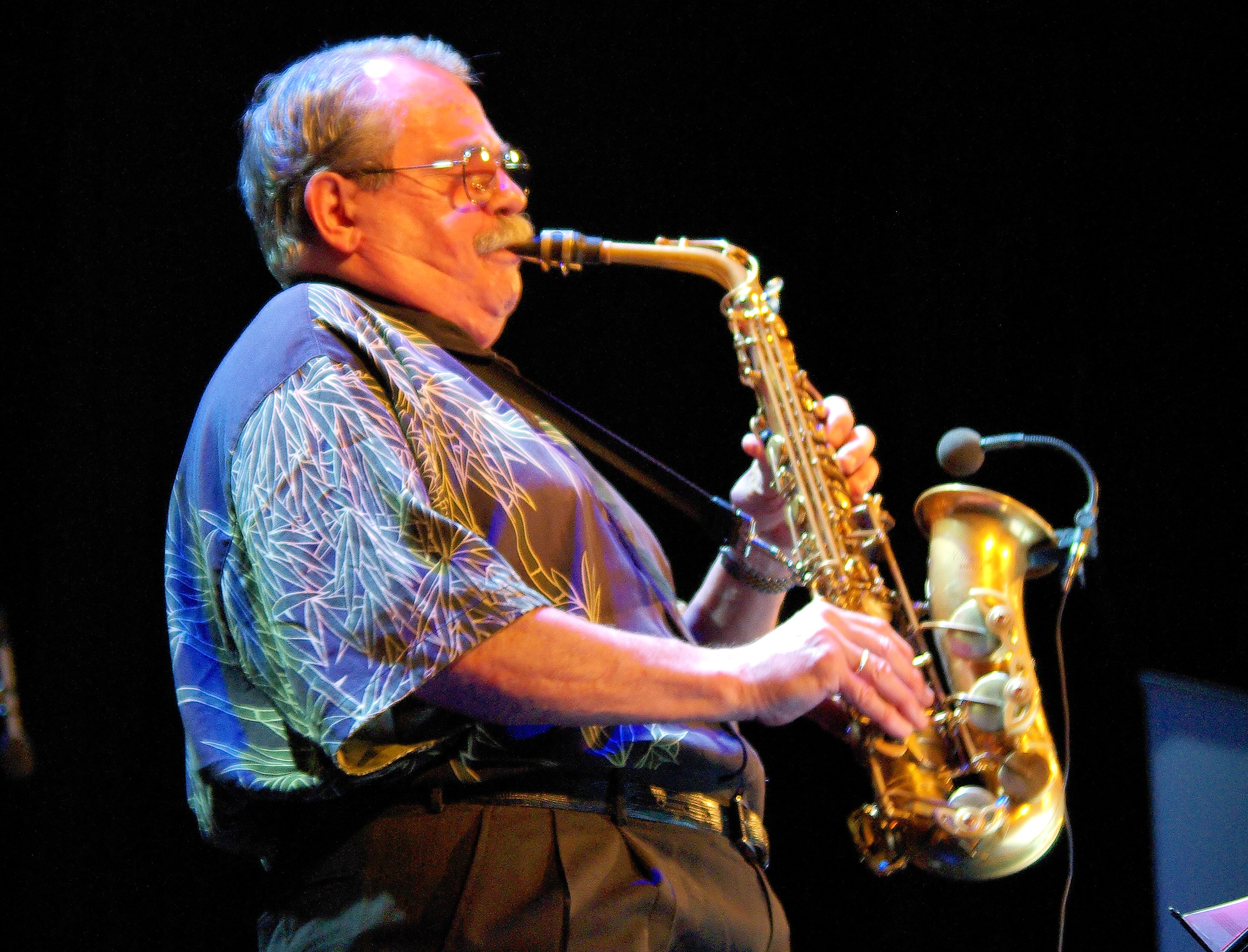
Woods in Oslo, 2007

- Altology (Prestige, 1976)[2LP] – rec. 1956–57
- Into the Woods (The Best of Phil Woods) (Concord, 1996)
- Moonlight In Vermont (CTI, 2005)[4CD]
- Complete Quintet And Sextet Sessions 1956-1957 (Fresh Sound, 2007)[2CD]
- Phil woods (Red, 2019)

=== As sideman ===
With Manny Albam

- Jazz Goes to the Movies (Impulse!, 1962)
- The Soul of the City (Solid State, 1966)

With Gary Burton

- 1962: Who Is Gary Burton? (RCA, 1963)
- 1964: The Groovy Sound of Music (RCA, 1965)

With Dizzy Gillespie

- World Statesman (Norgran, 1956)
- Dizzy in Greece (Verve, 1957)
- The New Continent (Limelight, 1962)
- Rhythmstick (CTI, 1990)

With Friedrich Gulda

- Friedrich Gulda at Birdland (RCA Victor, 1957)
- A Man of Letters (Decca, 1957)

With Quincy Jones

- The Birth of a Band! (Mercury, 1959)
- The Great Wide World of Quincy Jones (Mercury, 1959)
- I Dig Dancers (Mercury, 1961) – rec. 1960
- The Quintessence (Impulse!, 1962) – rec. 1961
- Quincy Jones Explores the Music of Henry Mancini (Mercury, 1964)
- Golden Boy (Mercury, 1964)
- I/We Had a Ball (Limelight, 1965) – rec. 1964-65
- Quincy Plays for Pussycats (Mercury, 1965) – rec. 1959-65

With Michel Legrand

- Legrand Jazz (Philips, 1958)
- After the Rain (Pablo, 1982)
- Michel Legrand and Friends (RCA, 1975)

With Bryan Lynch

- Simpático (The Brian Lynch/Eddie Palmieri Project) (ArtistShare, 2006)
- Bolero Nights for Billie Holiday (Venus, 2008)

With Herbie Mann

- The Jazz We Heard Last Summer (Savoy, 1957)
- Yardbird Suite (Savoy, 1957)

With the Modern Jazz Quartet

- Jazz Dialogue (Atlantic, 1965)
- MJQ & Friends: A 40th Anniversary Celebration (Atlantic, 1994)

With Thelonious Monk

- The Thelonious Monk Orchestra at Town Hall (Riverside, 1959) – live
- Big Band and Quartet in Concert (Columbia, 1963) – live

With Oliver Nelson

- Impressions of Phaedra (United Artists, 1962)
- Full Nelson (Verve, 1963)
- More Blues and the Abstract Truth (Impulse!, 1964)
- Fantabulous (Argo, 1964)
- Oliver Nelson Plays Michelle (Impulse!, 1966)
- Happenings with Hank Jones (Impulse!, 1966)
- The Sound of Feeling (Verve, 1966)
- Encyclopedia of Jazz (Verve, 1966)
- The Spirit of '67 with Pee Wee Russell (Impulse!, 1967)
- The Kennedy Dream (Impulse!, 1967)
- Jazzhattan Suite (Verve, 1968)

With Lalo Schifrin

- Samba Para Dos with Bob Brookmeyer (Verve, 1963)
- Once a Thief and Other Themes (Verve, 1965)

With Jimmy Smith

- Monster (Verve, 1965)
- Hoochie Coochie Man (Verve, 1966)
- Got My Mojo Workin' (Verve, 1966) – rec. 1965

With Clark Terry

- The Happy Horns of Clark Terry (Impulse!, 1964)
- Squeeze Me! (Chiaroscuro, 1989)

With George Wallington

- Jazz for the Carriage Trade (Prestige, 1956)
- The New York Scene (Prestige, 1957)
- Jazz at Hotchkiss (Savoy, 1957)

With others

- Greg Abate, Kindred Spirits: Live at Chan's (Whaling City Sound, 2016)[2CD] – live rec. 2014
- Franco Ambrosetti, Heartbop (Enja, 1981)
- Benny Bailey, Big Brass (Candid, 1960)
- Louis Bellson and Gene Krupa, The Mighty Two (Roulette, 1963)
- Bob Brookmeyer, Gloomy Sunday and Other Bright Moments (Verve, 1961)
- Kenny Burrell, A Generation Ago Today (Verve, 1967)
- Richie Cole, Side by Side (Muse, 1981) – live rec. 1980
- Benny Carter, Further Definitions (Impulse!, 1961)
- Ron Carter, Anything Goes (Kudu, 1975)
- the Kenny Clarke/Francy Boland Big Band, Latin Kaleidoscope (MPS, 1968)
- Al Cohn, Jazz Mission to Moscow (Colpix, 1962)
- Eddie Costa, Eddie Costa Quintet (Interlude, 1957)
- Lou Donaldson, Rough House Blues (Cadet, 1964)
- Bill Evans, Symbiosis (MPS, 1974)
- Gil Evans, The Individualism of Gil Evans (Verve, 1964)
- Art Farmer, Listen to Art Farmer and the Orchestra (Mercury, 1962)
- Stephane Grappelli, Classic Sessions: Stephane Grappelli (Who's Who In Jazz, 1987)
- Kenyon Hopkins, The Hustler (soundtrack) (Kapp, 1961)
- Milt Jackson, Ray Brown / Milt Jackson with Ray Brown (Verve, 1965)
- Billy Joel, Just The Way You Are on album The Stranger CBS, 1977)
- Benjamin Koppel, Pass the Bebop (Cowbell, 2006)
- John Lewis, Essence (Atlantic, 1962)
- Mundell Lowe, Satan in High Heels (soundtrack) (Charlie Parker, 1961)
- Rob McConnell, Boss Brass and Woods (MCA/Impulse!, 1985)
- Gary McFarland, The Jazz Version of "How to Succeed in Business without Really Trying" (Verve, 1962)
- Nellie McKay, Obligatory Villagers (Hungry Mouse, 2007)
- Carmen McRae, Something to Swing About (Kapp, 1959)
- Joe Newman, Salute to Satch (RCA Victor, 1956)
- Anita O'Day, All the Sad Young Men (Verve, 1962)
- Pony Poindexter, Pony's Express (Epic, 1962)
- Jimmy Raney, Jimmy Raney Quintet (Prestige, 1954)[10"]
- Jimmy Raney and Dick Hyman, Early Quintets (Prestige, 1969) – compilation
- Shirley Scott, Roll 'Em: Shirley Scott Plays the Big Bands (Impulse!, 1966)
- Sahib Shihab, Jazz Sahib (Savoy, 1957)
- Paul Simon, Still Crazy After All These Years (Columbia, 1975) - 1 track “Have a Good Time”
- Steely Dan, Katy Lied (ABC, 1975) – 1 track "Dr. Wu"
- Chris Swansen, Crazy Horse (Atlas, 1979)
- Billy Taylor, Kwamina (Mercury, 1961)
- Mel Tormé & Buddy Rich, Together Again: For the First Time (Gryphon, 1978)
- Kai Winding, Kai Olé (Verve, 1961)
