= Phil Woods and his European Rhythm Machine at the Frankfurt Jazz Festival =

Live album by Phil Woods
- Released: 1971
- Recorded: March 21, 1970
- Venue: the Deutsches Jazzfestival
- Genre: Jazz
- Length: 51:00
- Label: Embryo SE 4695
- Producer: Horst Lippmann

Phil Woods chronology
Round Trip (1969)	Phil Woods and his European Rhythm Machine at the Frankfurt Jazz Festival (1971)	Phil Woods and his European Rhythm Machine at the Montreux Jazz Festival (1970)

Phil Woods and his European Rhythm Machine at the Frankfurt Jazz Festival is a 1970 album by Phil Woods, produced by Horst Lippmann.

== Reception ==
Professional ratings
Review scores
Source	Rating
Allmusic	4.5/5 stars

Scott Yanow reviewed the album for Allmusic and wrote that "Woods' longtime bebop fans may not be that excited by these pretty free improvisations (although the musicians were clearly listening closely to each other), but the altoist's tone remained quite recognizable. Challenging and stimulating music".

== Track listing ==
1. "Freedom Jazz Dance" (Eddie Harris) – 13:30
2. "Ode A Jean Louis" (Phil Woods) – 13:30
3. "Josua" (Victor Feldman) – 13:00
4. "The Meeting" (Gordon Beck) – 11:00

== Personnel ==
- Phil Woods – alto saxophone
- Gordon Beck – piano
- Henri Texier – double bass
- Daniel Humair – drums
- Haig Adishian – album design
- Herbie Mann – executive producer
- Giuseppe G. Pino – black and white photography
- Marc Riboud – colour photography
- Horst Lippmann – producer
