= Round Trip (Phil Woods album) =

Studio album by Phil Woods
- Released: 1969
- Recorded: July 9–10, 1969
- Genre: Jazz
- Length: 37:48
- Label: Verve V6-8791
- Producer: Johnny Pate

Phil Woods chronology
Alto Summit (1968)	Round Trip (1969)	Phil Woods and his European Rhythm Machine at the Frankfurt Jazz Festival (1971)

Round Trip is a 1969 album by Phil Woods, produced by Johnny Pate.

== Reception ==
Professional ratings
Review scores
Source	Rating
Allmusic	3/5 stars

Ken Dryden reviewed the album for Allmusic and wrote that "Woods' playing is inspired, though some of the songs, including the title track, "Love Song for a Dead Che" and "I'm All Smiles" sound rather dated, as if they might have been appropriate for a movie soundtrack of the era. ...Woods' fans will want to pick this up".

== Track listing ==
1. "Round Trip" (Ornette Coleman) – 2:59
2. "Here's That Rainy Day" (Johnny Burke, Jimmy Van Heusen) – 4:01
3. "Love Song for the Dead Che" (Joseph Byrd) – 2:51
4. "I'm All Smiles" (Michael Leonard, Herbert Martin) – 3:09
5. "(In My) Solitude" (Duke Ellington, Eddie DeLange, Irving Mills) – 2:44
6. "How Can I Be Sure" (Eddie Brigati, Felix Cavaliere) – 2:52
7. "Fill the Woods with Laughter" (Johnny Pate) – 4:03
8. "This Is All I Ask" (Gordon Jenkins) – 3:32
9. "Flowers" (Woods) – 3:23
10. "Come out with Me" (Woods) – 5:24
11. "Guess What?" (Woods) – 2:50

== Personnel ==
Musicians

- Phil Woods – arranger, alto saxophone
- Thad Jones – flugelhorn, trumpet
- Jerry Dodgion – flute
- Tony Studd – bass trombone
- Ray Alonge, James Buffington, Jimmy Cleveland – trombone
- Romeo Penque, Jerome Richardson – woodwind
- Henri Aubert, Julius Brand, Frederick Buldrini, Max Cahn, Paul Gershman, Emanuel Green, Julius Held, Leo Kahn, Harry Katzman, Joseph Malin, Dave Mankovitz, George Ockner, Raoul Poliakin, Max Pollikoff, Tosha Samaroff, Julius Schachter – violin
- Julien Barber, Alfred Brown, Harold Coletta, Calman Fleisig – viola
- Seymour Barab, Charles McCracken, Kermit Moore, George Ricci, Anthony Sophos – cello
- Herbie Hancock, Roland Hanna – piano
- Richard Davis – double bass
- Grady Tate – drums
- Gene Orloff, Chris Swansen – conductor

Production

- Johnny Pate – arranger, producer
- Val Valentin – engineer
- Fred Seligo, Chuck Stewart – photography
- Elaine Gongora – cover design
- Suzanne White – design coordinator
- Sung Lee – art direction, design
- Tom Greenwood – production assistant
- Carlos Kase – production coordination
- Ben Young – research, restoration
- Bryan Koniarz – supervisor
