= Images (Phil Woods album) =

Album by Phil Woods

Studio album by Phil Woods
- Released: 1975
- Recorded: February 1975
- Genre: Jazz
- Length: 40:50
- Label: RCA Victor
- Producer: Nat Shapiro, Norman Schwartz, Michel Legrand

Phil Woods chronology
Musique du Bois (1974)	Images (1975)	Floresta Cano (1975)

Images is an album by Phil Woods that won the Grammy Award for Best Large Jazz Ensemble Album in 1976. Woods recorded the album with an orchestra conducted by Michel Legrand, who won a Grammy for Best Instrumental Composition.

== Track listing ==
No.	Title	Writer(s)	Length
1.	"The Windmills of Your Mind"	Alan Bergman/Marilyn Bergman/Michel Legrand	4:18
2.	"A Song for You"	Leon Russell	4:04
3.	"Nicole"	Phil Woods	3:33
4.	"The Summer Knows"	Bergman/Bergman/Legrand	3:01
5.	"We've Only Just Begun"	Roger Nichols/Paul Williams	2:51
6.	"I Was Born in Love With You"	Bergman/Bergman/Legrand	3:27
7.	"Clair de Lune"	Claude Debussy	4:50
8.	"Images"	Legrand	14:46

== Personnel ==
- Phil Woods – alto saxophone, liner notes
- Michel Legrand – piano, conductor, arranger, producer
- Armand Migiani – baritone saxophone, bass saxophone
- Derek Watkins – trumpet
- Don Lusher – trombone
- Ron Mathewson – double bass
- Judd Proctor – guitar
- Kenny Clare – drums
- Keith Grant – engineer
- Norman Schwartz – producer
- Nat Shapiro – executive producer
