= Greek Cooking =

Studio album by Phil Woods
- Released: 1967
- Recorded: January 31 and February 1, 1967
- Genre: Jazz
- Length: 34:24
- Label: Impulse!
- Producer: Bob Thiele

Phil Woods chronology
| Rights of Swing (1961) | Greek Cooking (1967) | Alto Summit (1968) |

Greek Cooking is an album by American saxophonist Phil Woods featuring performances recorded in 1967 for the Impulse! label.

== Reception ==
The Allmusic review by Ken Dryden awarded the album 3 stars stating "Probably one of the more unusual recordings in Phil Woods' considerable discography, Greek Cooking features the alto saxophonist leading a tentet with a distinctly Greek flavor, including four Greek musicians... it should appeal to Woods' fans because of his ability to make the best of the material with his powerful, never dull playing".

Professional ratings
Review scores
| Source | Rating |
|---|---|
| Allmusic | 3/5 stars |

== Track listing ==
All compositions by Norman Gold except where noted.

1. "Zorba the Greek" (Mikis Theodorakis) - 3:08
2. "A Taste of Honey" (Bobby Scott, Ric Marlow) - 6:00
3. "Theme from Anthony & Cleopatra" (Alex North) - 4:52
4. "Got a Feelin'" (Denny Doherty, John Phillips) - 4:30
5. "Theme from Samson & Delilah" (Victor Young) - 5:15
6. "Greek Cooking" - 5:00
7. "Nica" - 5:39

- Recorded in New York City on January 31 (tracks 2, 4 & 5), and February 1 (tracks 1, 3, 6 & 8), 1967

== Personnel ==
- Phil Woods - alto saxophone
- William Costa - accordion, marimba
- George Mgrdichian - oud
- Stuart Scharf - guitar
- Chet Amsterdam - electric bass
- Bill LaVorgna - drums
- Souren Baronian - drums, cymbals
- Seymour Salzberg - percussion
- Iordanis Tsomidis - bouzouki
- John Yalenezian - dumbeg
- Norman Gold - arranger
