= Spirits (Lee Konitz album) =

Studio album by Lee Konitz
- Released: 1971
- Recorded: February and March 1971
- Studio: Decca Studios, New York City
- Genre: Jazz
- Length: 44:27
- Label: Milestone; MSP 9038
- Producer: Dick Katz and Orrin Keepnews

Lee Konitz chronology
Peacemeal (1969)	Spirits (1971)	Altissimo (1973)

Spirits is an album by American jazz saxophonist Lee Konitz recorded in 1971 and released on the Milestone label.

== Critical reception ==
Professional ratings
Review scores
Source	Rating
Allmusic	4/5 stars
The Rolling Stone Jazz Record Guide	4/5 stars
The Penguin Guide to Jazz Recordings	3/4 stars

Scott Yanow of Allmusic said "Altoist Lee Konitz revisits his roots in pianist Lennie Tristano's music on this enjoyable recording ...this is excellent music and finds altoist Lee Konitz in creative form".

== Track listing ==
All compositions by Lennie Tristano unless noted.

1. "Baby" – 4:23
2. "Dreams" – 5:12
3. "Two Not One" – 5:35
4. "Hugo's Head" (Lee Konitz) – 3:39
5. "Background Music" (Warne Marsh) – 3:59
6. "Lennie-Bird" – 4:37
7. "Wow" – 4:26
8. "Kary's Trance" (Konitz) – 6:29
9. "Another 'Nother" (Konitz) – 6:07

== Personnel ==
- Lee Konitz – alto saxophone
- Sal Mosca – piano
- Ron Carter – bass (tracks 3, 4, 6 & 9)
- Mousey Alexander – drums (tracks 3, 4, 6 & 9)
