= In High Profile =

Studio album by Dick Katz
- Released: 1984
- Recorded: May 7 & 8, 1984
- Studio: Nola Studios, NYC
- Genre: Jazz
- Length: 38:57
- Label: Bee Hive Records BH 7016
- Producer: Bob Porter

Dick Katz chronology
The Feeling Is Mutual (1965)	In High Profile (1984)	3 Way Play (1992)

In High Profile is an album by pianist Dick Katz which was recorded in 1984 and released on the Bee Hive label.

== Reception ==
Professional ratings
Review scores
Source	Rating
AllMusic	4/5 stars

The AllMusic review by Scott Yanow stated, "Through the years, pianist Dick Katz through played an important role behind the scenes on many recording dates, including notable sets by Helen Merrill and Lee Konitz. He has led relatively few sessions of his own, making this quintet outing with Frank Wess, trombonist Jimmy Knepper, bassist Marc Johnson and drummer Al Harewood a special occasion".

== Track listing ==
No.	Title	Writer(s)	Length
1.	"Laverne Walk"	Oscar Pettiford	4:14
2.	"Crazy He Calls Me"	Carl Sigman, Bob Russell	4:52
3.	"A Few Bars for Basie"	Dick Katz	4:56
4.	"But Not for Me"	George Gershwin, Ira Gershwin	4:35
5.	"Cousin Mary"	John Coltrane	6:07
6.	"Friday the 13th"	Thelonious Monk	4:51
7.	"Lament"	J. J. Johnson	5:26
8.	"No Matter What"	Katz	4:32
Total length:			38:57

== Personnel ==
- Dick Katz – piano
- Jimmy Knepper – trombone (tracks 1, 3, 6 & 8)
- Frank Wess – tenor saxophone, flute (tracks 1, 3, 6 & 8)
- Marc Johnson – bass
- Al Harewood – drums
