= Essence (Shelly Manne album) =

Studio album by Shelly Manne
- Released: 1977
- Recorded: July 5 & 6, 1977
- Studio: Fantasy Studios, Berkeley, CA
- Genre: Jazz
- Label: Galaxy; GXY 5101
- Producer: Ed Michel

Shelly Manne chronology
Rex: Shelly Manne Plays Richard Rogers (1976)	Essence (1977)	French Concert (1977)

Essence is an album by Shelly Manne released on the Galaxy label in 1977.

Professional ratings
Review scores
Source	Rating
AllMusic	4.5/5 stars

== Track listing ==
1. "What Am I Here For?" (Duke Ellington) – 7:20
2. "Yesterdays" (Jerome Kern, Otto Harbach) – 3:04
3. "Take the Coltrane" (Ellington) – 8:44
4. "Ain’t Misbehavin'" (Fats Waller, Andy Razaf) – 5:42
5. "Essence" (Shelly Manne, Lew Tabackin, Mike Wofford, Chuck Domanico) – 4:57
6. "Soon" (George Gershwin, Ira Gershwin) – 4:33
7. "Body and Soul" (Johnny Green, Edward Heyman, Robert Sour, Frank Eyton) – 6:01

== Personnel ==
- Shelly Manne – drums
- Lew Tabackin – tenor saxophone, flute
- Mike Wofford – piano
- Chuck Domanico – bass
