= Rights of Swing =

Studio album by Phil Woods
- Released: 1961
- Recorded: January 26 and February 10, 1961
- Studios: Nola Penthouse Studio, New York City
- Genre: Jazz
- Length: 38:59
- Labels: Candid; CJS 9016
- Producer: Nat Hentoff

Phil Woods chronology
Jazz Alive! A Night at the Half Note (1959)	Rights of Swing (1961)	Greek Cooking (1967)

Rights of Swing is an album led by saxophonist Phil Woods featuring performances recorded in early 1961 and originally released on the Candid label.

== Reception ==
Professional ratings
Review scores
Source	Rating
AllMusic	5/5 stars
DownBeat	4/5 stars

The contemporaneous DownBeat reviewer, Ira Gitler, mentioned the influence of Igor Stravinsky on the album and wrote that: "Woods' virile alto shows the way, but all the soloists and supporting rhythm men are of consistently high quality." Scott Yanow of AllMusic says, "The colorful arrangements use the distinctive horns in inventive fashion and the music (which leaves room for many concise solos) holds one's interest throughout. One of Phil Woods' finest recordings, it's a true gem".

== Track listing ==
All compositions by Phil Woods.

1. "Prelude and Part I" - 7:00
2. "Part II (Ballad)" - 7:38
3. "Part III (Waltz)" - 5:39
4. "Part IV (Scherzo)" - 11:19
5. "Part V (Presto)" - 7:17

== Personnel ==
- Phil Woods - alto saxophone
- Benny Bailey - trumpet
- Julius Watkins - French horn
- Willie Dennis (track 5), Curtis Fuller (tracks 1–4) - trombone
- Sahib Shihab - baritone saxophone
- Tommy Flanagan - piano
- Buddy Catlett - bass
- Osie Johnson (tracks 1–4), Mickey Roker (track 5) - drums
