= Peggy Stern =

American jazz musician

Margaret "Peggy" Stern (born September 22, 1948, Philadelphia, Pennsylvania) is an American jazz pianist and synthesizer player.

== Career ==
Stern studied piano at the Eastman School of Music, receiving her bachelor's degree in 1968, then attended the New England Conservatory of Music (1968–70). She studied classical music, and her interest in improvisation was inspired by her experience with figured bass realizations in early music.

In the 1980s she performed as a jazz musician in an octet with Richie Cole and Julian Priester. She was also in R&B and Latin music bands. During the 1990s she worked with Lee Konitz and Vic Juris and recorded albums with her band. Stern taught at the Cornish Institute in Seattle from 1981 to 1989 and at the State University of New York at Purchase from 1991 to 1997.

In 2004 Stern started the Wall Street Jazz Festival in Kingston, New York. The festival has included Allison Miller, Claire Daly, Dena DeRose, Erica Lindsay, Ingrid Jensen, Jamie Baum, Jay Clayton, Jenny Scheinman, Lee Shaw, Marilyn Crispell, Natalie Cressman, Roberta Piket, Sheila Jordan, Sheryl Bailey, Sue Terry, and Virginia Mayhew.

Stern hosts jazz improvisation workshops for string students at the Boston University Tanglewood Institute.

== Discography ==
- City Hawk (BAM, 1985)
- Lunasea with Lee Konitz(Soul Note, 1992)
- The Jobim Collection with Lee Konitz (Philology, 1993)
- Pleiades (Philology, 1994)
- Room Enough (Koch, 1997)
- The Fuchsia with Thomas Chapin (Koch, 1997)
- Actual Size (Koch, 2000)
- Estrella Trio (Estrella, 2006)
- The Art of the Duo with Sweet Sue Terry (CDBaby, 2010)
- Z Octet (Estrella, 2015)

== Compositions ==
- Sunbath (Woody Shaw's "Love Dance" 1975 album recorded in New York): https://www.youtube.com/watch?v=B-FN21zHCFY
