= Pride (Lee Konitz album) =

Studio album by Lee Konitz
- Released: 1999
- Recorded: May 1999
- Genre: Jazz
- Length: 67:37
- Label: SteepleChase SCCD 31479
- Producer: Nils Winther

Lee Konitz chronology
Dig-It (1999)	Pride (1999)	Lee Konitz & the Axis String Quartet Play French Impressionist Music from the Turn of the 20th Century (2000)

Pride is an album by saxophonist Lee Konitz recorded in 1999 and released on the Danish SteepleChase label.

== Critical reception ==
Professional ratings
Review scores
Source	Rating
Allmusic	4/5 stars
The Penguin Guide to Jazz Recordings	3/4 stars

Scott Yanow of Allmusic said "The music always swings, the rhythm section is supportive, and Konitz is as inventive as always. This is also one of the few sessions in which the altoist (on a few cuts) is backed by organ". In JazzTimes, Bill Shoemaker wrote: "Pride adds to the case that Lee Konitz’s sustained creativity and prolific recording schedule have a chicken and egg relationship. Fronting contrasting rhythm sections, Konitz not only improvises with his trademark sublime mix of subtlety and adventurousness, but also contributes 3 tunes to the date, reinforcing his less heralded status as a resourceful composer ... Given Konitz’s output with more high-profile musicians, Pride is prone to being lost in the crowd, but those enamored Konitz’s knack for giving well-worn vehicles new traction will dig it".

== Track listing ==
All compositions by Lee Konitz except where noted

1. "Monkian' Around" – 4:46
2. "Triste" (Antônio Carlos Jobim) – 6:54
3. "Come Rain or Come Shine" (Harold Arlen, Johnny Mercer) – 7:00
4. "Stellar"- 13:35
5. "Gundula"- 8:09
6. "Secret Love" (Sammy Fain, Paul Francis Webster) – 11:50
7. "Lover Man" (Jimmy Davis, Roger "Ram" Ramirez, James Sherman) – 8:00
8. "Zingaro" (Jobim) – 6:49

== Personnel ==
- Lee Konitz – alto saxophone
- George Colligan – piano, organ
- Doug Weiss – bass
- Darren Beckett – drums
