= In Concert (Chet Baker and Lee Konitz album) =

Live album by Chet Baker and Lee Konitz
- Released: 1982
- Recorded: April 14, 1974
- Venue: Ornette's Club, Woodstock, NY
- Genre: Jazz
- Length: 67:28 CD release with bonus tracks
- Label: India Navigation; IN 1052
- Producer: Bob Cummins

Chet Baker chronology
Blood, Chet and Tears (1970)	In Concert (1982)	She Was Too Good to Me (1974)

Lee Konitz chronology
Altissimo (1973)	In Concert (1974)	Jazz à Juan (1974)

In Concert is a live album by saxophonist Lee Konitz and trumpeter Chet Baker which was recorded in 1974 and released on the India Navigation label in 1982.

== Reception ==
Professional ratings
Review scores
Source	Rating
Allmusic	3/5 stars

The Allmusic review by Scott Yanow states: "The matchup of the cool-toned trumpeter Chet Baker with the advanced but equally mellow-toned altoist Lee Konitz (in a pianoless quartet with bassist Michael Moore and drummer Beaver Harris) was a very logical combination. .... Baker and Konitz very much inspired each other on this frequently superb and exciting set".

== Track listing ==
1. "There Will Never Be Another You" (Harry Warren, Mack Gordon) – 9:54 Additional track on CD release
2. "Airegin, (Sonny Rollins) – 9:23
3. "Au Privave" (Charlie Parker) – 11:33
4. "Just Friends" (John Klenner, Sam M. Lewis) – 6:25 Additional track on CD release
5. "Body and Soul" (Johnny Green, Edward Heyman, Robert Sour, Frank Eyton) – 11:23
6. "This Is Always" (Warren, Gordon) – 6:09 Additional track on CD release
7. "Willow Weep for Me" (Ann Ronell) – 7:27
8. "Walkin'" (Richard Carpenter) – 5:24

== Personnel ==
- Chet Baker – trumpet, vocals
- Lee Konitz – alto saxophone
- Michael Moore – bass
- Beaver Harris – drums
