= Woodstock Jazz Festival 1 =

Live album by Chick Corea, Jack DeJohnette, Lee Konitz and Miroslav Vitous
- Released: 1997
- Recorded: September 19, 1981
- Venue: Creative Music Studio, Woodstock, NY
- Genre: Jazz
- Length: 53:17
- Label: Douglas Music; ADC8
- Producer: Barry Rebo & Associates

Chick Corea chronology
Live in Montreux (1981)	Woodstock Jazz Festival 1 (1997)	Woodstock Jazz Festival 2 (1981)

Lee Konitz chronology
Live at the Berlin Jazz Days 1980 (1980)	Woodstock Jazz Festival 1 (1981)	Woodstock Jazz Festival 2 (1981)

Jack DeJohnette chronology
Tin Can Alley (1980)	Woodstock Jazz Festival 1 (1981)	Woodstock Jazz Festival 2 (1981)

Miroslav Vitous chronology
Miroslav Vitous Group (1890)	Woodstock Jazz Festival 1 (1981)	Woodstock Jazz Festival 2 (1981)

Woodstock Jazz Festival 1 is an album by pianist Chick Corea, with saxophonist Lee Konitz, or drummer Jack DeJohnette and bassist Miroslav Vitous recorded at the Woodstock Jazz Festival celebrating Creative Music Studio's 10th Anniversary in Woodstock, NY in 1981 and released on the Douglas Music label in 1997.

== Critical reception ==
Professional ratings
Review scores
Source	Rating
Allmusic	4.5/5 stars

Michael G. Nastos on Allmusic called the album "an important musical and archival document, and probably just the tip of the iceberg for what other musical magic was conjured up on that special day in the rain".

== Track listing ==
All compositions by Chick Corea unless noted.

1. "Waltz" - 9:28
2. "Isfahan" (Billy Strayhorn, Duke Ellington) - 18:58
3. "Stella by Starlight" (Victor Young, Ned Washington) - 16:04
4. "'Round Midnight" (Thelonious Monk, Cootie Williams, Bernie Hanighen) - 8:47

== Personnel ==
- Chick Corea – piano
- Lee Konitz – alto saxophone (tracks 3 & 4)
- Jack DeJohnette – drums (tracks 1 & 2)
- Miroslav Vitous – bass (tracks 1 & 2)
