= Dick Katz =

American jazz musician

- Born: Richard Aaron Katz; March 13, 1924; Baltimore, Maryland, United States
- Died: November 10, 2009 (aged 85) New York City, United States
- Genres: Jazz
- Occupations: Musician; arranger; record producer
- Instrument: Piano
- Years active: 1950s–1990s
- Labels: Atlantic; Milestone; Reservoir; Bee Hive

Richard Aaron Katz (March 13, 1924 – November 10, 2009) was an American jazz pianist, arranger and record producer. He freelanced throughout much of his career, and worked in a number of ensembles. He co-founded Milestone Records in 1966 with Orrin Keepnews.

== Career ==
Katz studied at the Peabody Institute, the Manhattan School of Music, and Juilliard. He also took piano lessons from Teddy Wilson. In the 1950s, he joined the house rhythm section of the Café Bohemia, and worked in the groups of Ben Webster and Kenny Dorham, Oscar Pettiford, and, later, Carmen McRae. From 1954 to 1955, he was part of the J. J. Johnson/Kai Winding Quintet. He also worked in Orchestra USA and participated on Benny Carter's Further Definitions album, and worked on some of Helen Merrill's recordings. In the late 1960s, he played with Roy Eldridge and Lee Konitz. In the 1990s, he worked as a pianist and arranger with the American Jazz Orchestra and Loren Schoenberg's big band.

Will Friedwald called Katz "a keyboardist of uncommon sensitivity and harmonic acumen." He was the favorite pianist of Benny Carter and Coleman Hawkins, as well as vocalists Carmen McRae and Helen Merrill.

== Personal life ==
He died in Manhattan of lung cancer at the age of 85.

His son, Jamie Katz, a Columbia University graduate, is a freelance journalist and contributor to the Smithsonian magazine.

== Discography ==
=== As leader/co-leader ===
Year recorded	Title	Label	Notes
1957	Jazz Piano International	Atlantic	Trio, with Ralph Peña (bass), Connie Kay (drums); album shared with Derek Smith and René Urtreger
1958–59	Piano and Pen	Atlantic	Quartet, with Jimmy Raney and Chuck Wayne (guitar; separately), Joe Benjamin (bass), Connie Kay (drums)
1968	A Shade of Difference	Milestone	Co-led with Helen Merrill (vocals)
1984	In High Profile	Bee Hive	Some tracks trio, with Marc Johnson (bass), Al Harewood (drums); some tracks quintet, with Jimmy Knepper (trombone), Frank Wess (tenor sax, flute) added
1992	3 Way Play	Reservoir	Trio, with Steve LaSpina (bass), Ben Riley (drums)
1995	The Line Forms Here	Reservoir	Quintet, with Benny Golson (tenor sax), Ryan Kisor (trumpet), Steve LaSpina (bass), Ben Riley (drums)

=== As sideman ===
With Benny Carter

- Further Definitions (Impulse!, 1961)
- Central City Sketches (MusicMasters, 1987)

With Al Cohn

- Four Brass One Tenor (RCA Victor, 1955)

With Jack DeJohnette

- The DeJohnette Complex (Milestone, 1969)

With Kenny Dorham

- Kenny Dorham And The Jazz Prophets (Chess, 1956)

With Nancy Harrow

- Secrets (Soul Note, 1991)

With Milt Hinton

- East Coast Jazz /5 (Rhino, 1955)

With Jimmy Knepper

- Dream Dancing (Criss Cross, 1986)

With Lee Konitz

- The Lee Konitz Duets (Milestone, 1967)
- Peacemeal (Milestone, 1969)
- Satori (Milestone, 1974)
- Oleo (Sonet, 1975)
- Chicago 'n All That Jazz (Groove Merchant, 1975)

With Carmen McRae

- Something to Swing About (Kapp, 1959)

With Helen Merrill

- "The feeling is mutual" 1965
- Chasin' The Bird (Emarcy, 1979)

With James Moody

- The Blues and Other Colors (Milestone, 1969)

With Joe Newman

- I'm Still Swinging (RCA Victor, 1955)

With Oscar Pettiford

- The Oscar Pettiford Orchestra in Hi-Fi Volume Two (ABC-Paramount, 1957)

With Jimmy Raney

- Jimmy Raney featuring Bob Brookmeyer (ABC-Paramount) with Bob Brookmeyer

With Sonny Rollins

- Sonny Rollins and the Big Brass (Metrojazz, 1957)

With Loren Schoenberg

- ’’That’s The Way It Goes’’ (Aviva, 1984)
- ’’Time Waits For No One’’ (Music Masters 1987)
- ’’Solid Ground’’(Music Masters 1988)
- ’’Just A Settin’ And A-Rockin’ ‘’(Music Masters 1989)
- Manhattan Work Song (Music Masters 1992)
- Out Of This World (TBC; 1997)

With Ben Webster

- Big Ben Time! (Philips, 1963)

With Kai Winding and J. J. Johnson

- Kai and Jay and Bennie Green with Strings (OJC, 1952–54)
- K + J.J. (Bethlehem, 1955)
- Dave Brubeck and Jay & Kai at Newport (Columbia, 1956)
- Jay and Kai (Columbia, 1957)

== See also ==
- First English Public Jam Session
