= The Lee Konitz Duets =

Studio album by Lee Konitz
- Released: November 1968
- Recorded: September 25, 1967
- Studio: Plaza Sound Studios, New York City
- Genre: Jazz
- Length: 45:17
- Label: Milestone; MSP 9013
- Producer: Dick Katz

Lee Konitz chronology
Modern Jazz Compositions from Haiti (1966)	The Lee Konitz Duets (1968)	Alto Summit (1968)

The Lee Konitz Duets is an album by American saxophonist Lee Konitz, recorded in 1967 and released in 1968 on the Milestone label.

Professional ratings
Review scores
Source	Rating
Allmusic	5/5 stars
The Rolling Stone Jazz Record Guide	5/5 stars

== Track listing ==
1. "Struttin' With Some Barbecue" - 3:07
2. "You Don't Know What Love Is" - 3:33
3. "Variations on Alone Together" - 15:03
4. "Checkerboard" - 5:50
5. "Erb" - 3:09
6. "Tickletoe" - 2:59
7. "Duplexity" - 6:19
8. "Alphanumeric" - 5:17

== Personnel ==
- Lee Konitz - alto sax (1-5, 8), tenor sax (3, 6-7), baritone sax (1), amplified alto sax (3, 8)
- Joe Henderson - tenor sax (2, 8)
- Richie Kamuca - tenor sax (6, 8)
- Marshall Brown - valve trombone (1, 8), euphonium (1)
- Dick Katz - piano (4, 8)
- Karl Berger - vibes (3, 8)
- Jim Hall - guitar (5, 8)
- Eddie Gómez - bass (3, 8)
- Elvin Jones - drums (3, 8)
- Ray Nance - violin (7)
