= European Episode =

Studio album by Lee Konitz and Martial Solal
- Released: 1968
- Recorded: October 12, 1968
- Studio: Rome, Italy
- Genre: Jazz
- Label: Campi; SJG 12002

Lee Konitz chronology
Alto Summit (1967)	European Episode (1968)	Impressive Rome (1968)

Professional ratings
Review scores
Source	Rating
The Penguin Guide to Jazz Recordings	3.5/4 stars

European Episode is an album by American jazz saxophonist Lee Konitz and French pianist Martial Solal recorded in Italy in 1968 and released on the Campi label.

== Track listing ==
1. "Collage on Standards" (Johnny Dinamo) - 16:25
2. "Duet for Saxophone and Drums and Piano" (Dinamo) - 5:58
3. "Anthropology" [Version 1] (Charlie Parker, Dizzy Gillespie) - 7:35
4. "Lover Man" [Version 2] (Jimmy Davis, Ram Ramirez, Jimmy Sherman) - 6:23
5. "Roman Blues" [Version 1] - 8:25

== Personnel ==
- Lee Konitz – alto saxophone
- Martial Solal – piano
- Henri Texier – bass
- Daniel Humair – drums
