= Impressive Rome =

Studio album by Lee Konitz and Martial Solal
- Released: 1968
- Recorded: October 12, 1968
- Studio: Rome, Italy
- Genre: Jazz
- Label: Campi; SJG 12003

Lee Konitz chronology
European Episode (1968)	Impressive Rome (1968)	Stereokonitz (1968)

Impressive Rome is an album by American jazz saxophonist Lee Konitz and French pianist Martial Solal recorded in Italy in 1968 and released on the Campi label.

== Critical reception ==
Professional ratings
Review scores
Source	Rating
Allmusic	4/5 stars
The Penguin Guide to Jazz Recordings	3.5/4 stars

Ken Dryden of Allmusic commented: "Lee Konitz's initial recording session with pianist Martial Solal produced two albums (the other one is European Episode), including alternate versions of several songs ... This was a great beginning to an occasional partnership that lasted into the early '80s and produced several more albums".

== Track listing ==
1. "Anthropology" [Version 2] (Charlie Parker, Dizzy Gillespie) - 6:55
2. "Impressive Rome" (Johnny Dinamo) - 5:23
3. "Lover Man" [Version 1] (Jimmy Davis, Ram Ramirez, Jimmy Sherman) - 6:15
4. "Stella by Starlight" (Victor Young, Ned Washington) - 6:55
5. "Roman Blues" [Version 2] (Dinamo) - 9:10

== Personnel ==
- Lee Konitz – alto saxophone
- Martial Solal – piano
- Henri Texier – bass
- Daniel Humair – drums
