= Sound of Surprise =

Studio album by Lee Konitz
- Released: 1999
- Recorded: April 21 & 22, 1999
- Studio: Avatar, New York City
- Genre: Jazz
- Length: 71:26
- Label: RCA Victor; SCCD 31466
- Producer: Jean-Jacques Pussiau

Lee Konitz chronology
Tender Lee (For Chet) (1998)	Sound of Surprise (1999)	Dig-It (1999)

Sound of Surprise is an album by saxophonist Lee Konitz recorded in 1999 and released on the French RCA Victor label.

== Critical reception ==
Professional ratings
Review scores
Source	Rating
Allmusic	4/5 stars

Michael G. Nastos of Allmusic said "Yet another fine recording from Konitz, this adds to an already immense discography that seems to get broader and deeper as it lengthens". In JazzTimes, Doug Ramsey wrote: "Moving deeper into his 70s, Konitz still records prolifically on a variety of labels, pursuing improvisation with a purity of conception and dedication to avoidance of cliches and practiced licks. His ratio of inspiration to parts used has always been one of the highest in jazz. Sound of Surprise demonstrates that Konitz’s originality has not eroded and may, in fact, have increased". On All About Jazz, Marc Corotto noted "Konitz plays with his subtle subversive familiarity. ... Trading saxophone duets and guitar/sax spots, Konitz work is just another day at the office. His understated style rubs off on his partners, all playing in the “less is more” mode".

== Track listing ==
All compositions by Lee Konitz except where noted

1. "Hi Beck" – 8:19
2. "Gundula" – 3:47
3. "Mr. 88" – 4:40
4. "Bits and Pieces" – 3:01
5. "Blues Suite" – 7:52
6. "Friend Lee" – 7:33
7. "Soddy and Bowl" – 5:40
8. "Singin'" – 2:28
9. "Wingin'" (John Abercrombie, Joey Baron, Ted Brown, Marc Johnson, Lee Konitz) – 6:42
10. "Thingin'" – 7:26
11. "Crumbles" – 5:34
12. "Subconscious Lee" – 8:24

== Personnel ==
- Lee Konitz – alto saxophone
- Ted Brown – tenor saxophone
- John Abercrombie – guitar
- Marc Johnson – bass
- Joey Baron – drums
