= Ted Brown (saxophonist) =

- Birth name: Theodore Brown
- Born: December 1, 1927 (age 97); Rochester, New York, U.S.
- Genres: Jazz, cool jazz
- Instruments: Tenor saxophone

Theodore "Ted" G. Brown (born December 1, 1927) is an American cool jazz tenor saxophonist. Brown has worked with Warne Marsh and Ronnie Ball, and recorded with Lennie Tristano, Art Pepper, Hod O'Brien and Lee Konitz, as well as heading his own groups.

== Discography ==
=== As leader and co-leader ===
- 1956: Free Wheeling (Vanguard)
- 1985: In Good Company with Jimmy Raney (Criss Cross)
- 1989: Free Spirit (Criss Cross)
- 1999: Dig-It with Lee Konitz (SteepleChase)
- 2002: Preservation (SteepleChase)
- 2006: Complete Free Wheeling Sessions with Art Pepper (compilation album)
- 2007: Shades of Brown
- 2009: Live at Pit Inn (Marshmallow)
- 2012: Two of a Kind with Brad Linde (Bleebop)
- 2012: Pound Cake with Kirk Knuffke (SteepleChase)
- 2018: All About Lennie with Brad Linde (Bleebop Records)
- 2018: Jazz Of New Cities with Brad Linde (Bleebop Records)
- 2020: Drifting On A Reed with Brad Linde (Bleebop Records)

=== As sideman ===
With Lee Konitz

- Lee Konitz Meets Jimmy Giuffre (Verve, 1959) with Jimmy Giuffre
- Figure and Spirit (1976)
- Sound of Surprise (RCA Victor, 1999)

With Warne Marsh

- Jazz of Two Cities (Imperial, 1956)

With Lennie Tristano

- Intuition (1996)
