= Live at the Berlin Jazz Days 1980 =

Live album by Lee Konitz and Martial Solal
- Released: 1982
- Recorded: October 30, 1980
- Venue: Philharmonie Berlin, West Germany
- Genre: Jazz
- Label: MPS; 0068289
- Producer: Sender Freies Berlin

Lee Konitz chronology
Anti-Heroes (1980)	Live at the Berlin Jazz Days 1980 (1982)	Woodstock Jazz Festival 1 (1981)

Martial Solal chronology
Four Keys (1979)	Live at the Berlin Jazz Days 1980 (1980)	Bluesine (1983)

Live at the Berlin Jazz Days 1980 is a live album featuring a memorial concert for Lennie Tristano by saxophonist Lee Konitz and pianist Martial Solal which was recorded at the Berliner Philharmonie by Sender Freies Berlin as part of the Berliner Jazztage in 1980 and released on the MPS label in 1982. The album was also released in the US on Pausa Records.

== Critical reception ==
Professional ratings
Review scores
Source	Rating
Allmusic	3/5 stars

The Allmusic review stated "Although the repertoire certainly pays tribute to Tristano's legacy the altoist had grown quite a bit as an improviser during the previous 30 years and Solal is a major stylist in his own right. Their explorative and spontaneous music covers a wide area of styles from swing and cool-toned bop to freer explorations and lives up to one's expectations".

== Track listing ==
All Compositions by Martial Solal and Lee Konitz unless noted.

1. "Invitation" (Bronisław Kaper, Paul Francis Webster) – 5:45
2. "No. 317 East 32nd Street" (Lennie Tristano) – 4:37
3. "A Ballad for Lennie" – 7:35
4. "Improvisation No. 53" – 5:56
5. "Just a Blues" – 5:40
6. "Star Eyes" (Gene de Paul, Don Raye) – 5:32
7. "Noblesse Oblige" (Ray Noble) – 5:44
8. "Subconciously" (sic) (Lee Konitz) – 4:50

== Personnel ==
- Lee Konitz – alto saxophone
- Martial Solal – piano
