= Peacemeal =

Studio album by Lee Konitz Quintet
- Released: 1970
- Recorded: March 20–21, 1969
- Studio: Decca Studios, New York City
- Genre: Jazz
- Length: 60:21
- Label: Milestone; MSP 9025
- Producer: Dick Katz

Lee Konitz chronology
Stereokonitz (1968)	Peacemeal (1970)	Spirits (1971)

Peacemeal is an album by American jazz saxophonist Lee Konitz's Quintet recorded in 1969 and released on the Milestone label. The 2004 CD reissue added three alternate takes as bonus tracks not on the original LP.

== Critical reception ==
Professional ratings
Review scores
Source	Rating
Allmusic	4.5/5 stars
The Rolling Stone Jazz Record Guide	3/5 stars

Scott Yanow of Allmusic called it "A thought-provoking and consistently enjoyable set of music".

== Track listing ==
1. "Thumb Under (No. 98 from Mikrokosmos)" (Béla Bartók) – 3:11
2. "Lester Leaps In" (Lester Young) – 3:22
3. "Village Joke (No. 130 from Mikrokosmos)" (Bartók) – 4:05
4. "Something to Sing" (Dick Katz) – 4:09
5. "Peacemeal" (Katz) – 7:05
6. "Body and Soul" (Johnny Green, Edward Heyman, Frank Eyton, Robert Sour) – 5:04
7. "Peasant Dance (No. 128 From Mikrokosmos)" (Bartók) – 4:56
8. "Fourth Dimension" (Lee Konitz) – 4:34
9. "Second Thoughts" (Katz) – 3:06
10. "Subconscious-Lee" (Konitz) – 4:13
11. "Lester Leaps In" [Take 4] (Young) – 3:18 Bonus track on CD reissue
12. "Body and Soul" [Take 3] (Green, Heyman, Eyton, Sour) – 6:30 Bonus track on CD reissue
13. "Subconscious-Lee" [Take 6] (Konitz) – 5:51 Bonus track on CD reissue

== Personnel ==
- Lee Konitz – alto saxophone, tenor saxophone, multivider
- Marshall Brown – valve trombone, baritone horn
- Dick Katz – piano, electric piano
- Eddie Gómez – bass
- Jack DeJohnette – drums
