= Duplicity (Lee Konitz and Martial Solal album) =

Album by Lee Konitz

Studio album by Lee Konitz and Martial Solal
- Released: 1978
- Recorded: November 29, 1977
- Studio: Mama Dog, Rome, Italy
- Genre: Jazz
- Label: Horo; HDP 17–18
- Producer: Aldo Sinesio

Lee Konitz chronology
French Concert (1977)	Duplicity (1978)	Tenorlee (1977–78)

Duplicity is an album by American jazz saxophonist Lee Konitz and French jazz pianist Martial Solal recorded in 1977 and released on the Italian Horo label.

Professional ratings
Review scores
Source	Rating
Allmusic	3/5 stars

== Track listing ==
All compositions by Lee Konitz and Martial Solal unless noted.

1. "Duplicity" – 6:58
2. "Roman Walkings" (Martial Solal) – 5:28
3. "Esselle" (Lee Konitz) – 4:25
4. "Words Have Changed" – 18:55
5. "November Talk" – 6:35
6. "Blues Sketch" – 11:20
7. "Rhythm Sweet" – 19:06

== Personnel ==
- Lee Konitz – alto saxophone
- Martial Solal – piano (tracks 1, 2 & 4–7)
