= Chicago 'n All That Jazz =

Studio album by Lee Konitz
- Released: 1975
- Recorded: January 1975
- Studio: C.I. Studios, New York City
- Genre: Jazz
- Length: 36:23
- Label: Groove Merchant; GM 3306
- Producer: Sonny Lester

Lee Konitz chronology
Oleo (1975)	Chicago 'n All That Jazz (1975)	Windows (1975)

Chicago 'n All That Jazz (subtitled Big Band Jazz of the Broadway Musical) is an album by American jazz saxophonist Lee Konitz performing John Kander and Fred Ebb's songs from the Broadway musical Chicago recorded in 1975 and released on the Groove Merchant label.

== Critical reception ==
Professional ratings
Review scores
Source	Rating
Allmusic	3/5 stars

Scott Yanow of Allmusic said " Konitz and his sidemen play with enthusiasm and melodic creativity; some of the themes are quite catchy. The playing time (around 36 minutes) is quite brief and the music is far from essential but the performances are surprisingly pleasing, making this a worthy purchase".

== Track listing ==
All compositions by John Kander and Fred Ebb.

1. "Funny Honey" – 5:03
2. "My Own Best Friend" – 3:55
3. "Ten Percent" – 4:36
4. "Loopin' de Loop" – 3:59
5. "Razzle Dazzle" – 4:09
6. "Me and My Baby" – 5:20
7. "Roxie" – 3:30
8. "Class" – 5:51

== Personnel ==
- Lee Konitz – alto saxophone, soprano saxophone
- Lloyd Michels, Richard Hurwitz – trumpet
- Barry Mour – trombone
- Alan Raph – trombone
- Joe Farrell – tenor saxophone
- Don Palmer – tenor saxophone
- Dick Katz – piano, electric piano
- Mike Longo – electric piano, synthesizer
- George Davis – guitar
- Major Holley – bass, vocals
- Eddie Locke – drums
- Ray Armando – percussion
