= Tenorlee =

Studio album by Lee Konitz
- Released: 1978
- Recorded: January 7 & July 24, 1977 and March 23, 1978
- Studio: Macdonald Studio, NYC
- Genre: Jazz
- Label: Choice; CRS 1019
- Producer: Gerry Macdonald

Lee Konitz chronology
Duplicity (1977)	Tenorlee (1978)	Yes, Yes, Nonet (1978)

Tenorlee is an album by American jazz saxophonist Lee Konitz, released on the Choice label in 1978 and rereleased by Candid in 1996, with two bonus tracks.

== Critical reception ==
Professional ratings
Review scores
Source	Rating
AllMusic	4/5 stars
The Penguin Guide to Jazz Recordings	3/4 stars
The Rolling Stone Jazz Record Guide	3/5 stars

Scott Yanow on AllMusic said that "Konitz explores ten superior standards from the swing era plus a brief unaccompanied workout... The relaxed, often lyrical, and slightly unpredictable interpretations are quite enjoyable".

== Track listing ==
1. "I Remember You" (Victor Schertzinger, Johnny Mercer) – 6:33
2. "Skylark" (Hoagy Carmichael, Mercer) – 3:35
3. "Thanks for the Memory" (Ralph Rainger, Leo Robin) – 4:11
4. "You Are Too Beautiful" (Richard Rodgers, Lorenz Hart) – 4:26
5. "Handful of Stars" (Jack Lawrence, Ted Shapiro) – 5:20
6. "Autumn Nocturne" (Josef Myrow, Kim Gannon) – 3:28
7. "Tangerine" (Schertzinger, Mercer) – 3:54
8. "Tenorlee/Oh, Lady Be Good!" (Lee Konitz/George Gershwin, Ira Gershwin) – 8:12
9. "The Gypsy" (Billy Reid) – 3:22 Bonus track on CD reissue
10. "'Tis Autumn" (Henry Nemo) – 3:58 Bonus track on CD reissue
- Recorded at Macdonald Studio, NYC on January 7, 1977 (tracks 2, 4, 6 & 7), July 24, 1977 (tracks 1, 3 & 5) and March 23, 1978 (tracks 8–10)

== Personnel ==
- Lee Konitz – tenor saxophone
- Jimmy Rowles – piano
- Michael Moore – bass
