= Stereokonitz =

Studio album by Lee Konitz
- Released: 1968
- Recorded: October 1968
- Studio: Rome, Italy
- Genre: Jazz
- Label: RCA; OLS 2

Lee Konitz chronology
Impressive Rome (1968)	Stereokonitz (1968)	Peacemeal (1969)

Stereokonitz is an album by American jazz saxophonist Lee Konitz recorded in Italy in 1968 and released on the Italian RCA label.

== Critical reception ==
Professional ratings
Review scores
Source	Rating
Allmusic	3.5/5 stars

Ken Dryden of Allmusic said "Tommaso's charts delve into bop and cool, with Konitz primarily playing the Varitone (a form of electronic saxophone that was experimented with briefly and abandoned by reed players in the late '60s), though he does play some alto sax and also makes a rare appearance on flute (doubling on it in "Take Seven"). While the music from this 1968 session is enjoyable, even though the sound quality of the Varitone pales when compared to a regular saxophone, this remains one of Lee Konitz's more obscure recordings from the '60s".

== Track listing ==
All compositions by Giovanni Tommaso except where noted.

1. "A Minor Blues" (Lee Konitz) - 4:37
2. "Five, Four and Three" - 3:32
3. "Kominia" - 4:44
4. "Midnight Mood" - 3:49
5. "Terre Lontane" - 5:25
6. "Take Seven" - 3:13
7. "Giovanni d'Oggi" - 4:20
8. "Tune Down" - 4:51

== Personnel ==
- Lee Konitz – alto saxophone, varitone, flute
- Enrico Rava - trumpet
- Franco D'Andrea – piano
- Giovanni Tommaso – bass
- Gegè Munari – drums
