= Lunasea =

Studio album by Lee Konitz and Peggy Stern
- Released: December 31, 1992
- Recorded: January 13–14, 1992
- Studio: Sear Sound, New York City
- Genre: Jazz
- Length: 70:29
- Label: Soul Note; SN 1249
- Producer: Lee Konitz and Peggy Stern

Lee Konitz chronology
Friends (1991)	Lunasea (1992)	Unleemited (1992)

Lunasea is an album by saxophonist Lee Konitz and pianist Peggy Stern which was recorded in 1992 and released on the Italian Soul Note label.

== Critical reception ==
Professional ratings
Review scores
Source	Rating
Allmusic	4/5 stars
The Penguin Guide to Jazz Recordings	3/4 stars

The Allmusic review stated "Konitz and his players perform everything from jams in the Lennie Tristano tradition and Brazilian pieces that are almost pop-oriented to free improvisations. Stern is quite impressive throughout the date. Classically trained, she proves from the start that she has a real talent at improvisation and is not afraid to take chances. Konitz sounds inspired by her presence and their interplay makes this an easily recommended set for adventurous listeners".

== Track listing ==
All compositions by Peggy Stern except where noted.

1. "Subconscious Lee II" (Lee Konitz) – 7:10
2. "Femaleon" (Konitz, Stern) – 4:06
3. "Bossa Tia" – 5:49
4. "The Final Blow" (Konitz, Stern) – 4:31
5. "Lunasea" – 5:27
6. "Matter of Opinion" – 4:26
7. "The Aerie" – 5:46
8. "Leeway" – 6:13
9. "Stanbye" – 4:20
10. "To Peggy" (Vic Juris, Konitz) – 3:25
11. "Solo Too" – 1:40
12. "Opertune" – 6:00
13. "Djuo" (Konitz, Stern) – 4:17
14. "S'gone" – 5:52
15. "P.S." (Konitz, Stern) – 1:27

== Personnel ==
- Lee Konitz – alto saxophone
- Peggy Stern – piano
- Vic Juris – guitar
- Harvie Swartz – bass
- Jeff Williams – drums
- Guilherme Franco – percussion
