= I Concentrate on You: A Tribute to Cole Porter =

Studio album by Lee Konitz and Red Mitchell
- Released: 1974
- Recorded: July 30, 1974
- Studio: Rosenberg Studio, Copenhagen, Denmark
- Genre: Jazz
- Length: 56:25
- Label: SteepleChase; SCS 1018
- Producer: Nils Winther

Lee Konitz chronology
Jazz à Juan (1974)	I Concentrate on You: A Tribute to Cole Porter (1974)	Lone-Lee (1974)

I Concentrate on You: A Tribute to Cole Porter is an album by American jazz saxophonist Lee Konitz and bassist Red Mitchell recorded in Denmark in 1974 and released on the Danish SteepleChase label.

== Critical reception ==
Professional ratings
Review scores
Source	Rating
Allmusic	4/5 stars

Ken Dryden on Allmusic said "With an inventive accompanist like Mitchell spurring him on, the alto saxophonist is able to work magical variations of the familiar Porter works, while Konitz retains his remarkable dry signature tone".

== Track listing ==
All compositions by Cole Porter.

1. "Just One of Those Things" – 5:08
2. "Just One of Those Things" (Take 7) – 3:04 Bonus track on CD reissue
3. "Easy to Love" – 3:13
4. "It's All Right with Me" – 2:59
5. "Ev'ry Time We Say Goodbye" (Take 1) – 2:47 Bonus track on CD reissue
6. "Ev'rytime We Say Goodbye" – 2:49
7. "You'd Be So Nice to Come Home To" – 3:45
8. "Love for Sale" – 5:15
9. "In the Still of the Night" – 2:10
10. "Night and Day" (Take 1) – 5:12 Bonus track on CD reissue
11. "Night and Day" – 3:54
12. "I Love You" – 3:34
13. "I Love Paris" – 3:22
14. "I Concentrate on You" – 9:13

== Personnel ==
- Lee Konitz – alto saxophone
- Red Mitchell – bass, piano
