= Alto Summit =

Studio album by Lee Konitz, Pony Poindexter, Phil Woods and Leo Wright
- Released: 1968
- Recorded: June 2–3, 1968
- Studio: MPS Tonstudio, Villingen, Black Forest, West Germany
- Genre: Jazz
- Length: 45:39
- Label: MPS; MPS 15 192
- Producer: Joachim E. Berendt

Lee Konitz chronology
The Lee Konitz Duets (1967)	Alto Summit (1968)	European Episode (1968)

Pony Poindexter chronology
Annie Ross & Pony Poindexter (1966)	Alto Summit (1968)	The Happy Life of Pony (1969)

Phil Woods chronology
Greek Cooking (1967)	Alto Summit (1968)	Round Trip (1969)

Leo Wright chronology
Flöte + Alt-Sax (1965)	Alto Summit (1968)	It's All Wright (1972)

Prestige Records Cover

Alto Summit is an album by saxophonists Lee Konitz, Pony Poindexter, Phil Woods and Leo Wright recorded in West Germany in 1968 and released on the MPS label. The album was released in the US on Prestige Records.

== Critical reception ==
Professional ratings
Review scores
Source	Rating
Allmusic	3/5 stars

Scott Yanow of Allmusic said "This unusual album teams together the altos of Lee Konitz, Pony Poindexter, Phil Woods and Leo Wright (along with pianist Steve Kuhn, bassist Palle Danielsson and drummer Jon Christensen) on a variety of challenging material. There are four pieces for the full septet (including one that pays tribute to both Bach and Bird), a pair of quintet performances and a ballad medley that ends in a complete fiasco (it has to be heard to be believed). Despite the latter, everyone fares well on this summit meeting".

== Track listing ==
1. "Native Land" (Curtis Amy) – 6:13
2. "Ballad Medley: Skylark/Blue and Sentimental/Gee, Baby, Ain't I Good to You/Body and Soul" (Hoagy Carmichael, Johnny Mercer/Count Basie, Jerry Livingston, Mack David/Andy Razaf, Don Redman/Johnny Green, Edward Heyman, Robert Sour, Frank Eyton) – 11:15
3. "Prompt" (Benny Bailey) – 5:40
4. "The Perils of Poda" (Phil Woods) – 5:12
5. "Good Booty" (Pony Poindexter) – 8:14
6. "Lee O's Blues" (Leo Wright, Lee Konitz) – 4:30
7. "Lee's Tribute to Bach and Bird" (Johann Sebastian Bach/Charlie Parker) – 4:20

== Personnel ==
- Lee Konitz (tracks 1–4, 6 & 7), Pony Poindexter (tracks 1–5 & 7), Phil Woods (tracks 1–5 & 7), Leo Wright (tracks 1–4, 6 & 7) – alto saxophone
- Steve Kuhn – piano
- Palle Danielsson – bass
- Jon Christensen – drums
