= Oleo (Lee Konitz album) =

Studio album by The Lee Konitz Trio
- Released: 1975
- Recorded: January 1975
- Studio: C.I. Studios, New York City
- Genre: Jazz
- Label: Sonet; SNTF 690
- Producer: Sam Charters

Lee Konitz chronology
| Satori (1974) | Oleo (1975) | Chicago 'n All That Jazz (1975) |

Oleo is an album by American jazz saxophonist Lee Konitz's Trio recorded in early 1975 and released on the Sonet label.

== Critical reception ==
Professional ratings
Review scores
| Source | Rating |
|---|---|
| Allmusic | 3/5 stars |
| The Rolling Stone Jazz Record Guide | 4/5 stars |

Scott Yanow of Allmusic said "In general the improvisations are quite relaxed and thoughtful and, although the results are not all that essential, the altoist's fans will find much to enjoy during these fine performances".

== Track listing ==
1. "Weaver of Dreams" (Jack Elliott, Victor Young)
2. "I Want a Little Girl" (Billy Moll, Murray Mencher)
3. "Invitation" (Bronisław Kaper, Paul Francis Webster)
4. "I Remember Clifford" (Benny Golson)
5. "Oleo" (Sonny Rollins)
6. "St. Thomas" (Rollins)
7. "No Greater Love" (Isham Jones, Marty Symes)
8. "Lushlife" (Billy Strayhorn)

== Personnel ==
- Lee Konitz - alto saxophone, soprano saxophone
- Dick Katz - piano, electric piano
- Wilbur Little - double bass
