= Altissimo (album) =

Studio album by Gary Bartz, Lee Konitz, Jackie McLean, Charlie Mariano
- Released: 1973
- Recorded: July 15, 1973
- Studio: Rosenberg, Copenhagen, Denmark
- Genre: Jazz
- Length: 41:25
- Label: Philips; RJ-5102
- Producer: Joachim Ernst Berendt

Lee Konitz chronology
Spirits (1971)	Altissimo (1973)	In Concert (1973)

Jackie McLean chronology
Live at Montmartre (1972)	Altissimo (1973)	Ode to Super (1973)

Gary Bartz chronology
Singerella: A Ghetto Fairy Tale (1972)	Altissimo (1973)	The Shadow Do! (1975)

Charlie Mariano chronology
Blue Stone (1971)	Altissimo (1973)	Reflections (1974)

Altissimo is an album by alto saxophonists Gary Bartz, Lee Konitz, Jackie McLean and Charlie Mariano which was recorded in Denmark in 1973 and first released on the Japanese Philips label.

== Reception ==
Professional ratings
Review scores
Source	Rating
AllMusic	4.5/5 stars

The AllMusic review by Ron Wynn states: "This is a great summit meeting".

== Track listing ==
All compositions by Lee Konitz except where noted

1. "Another Hairdo" (Charlie Parker) – 3:45
2. "Mode for Jay Mac"(Billy Gault) – 9:45
3. "Love Choral" – 7:32
4. "Fanfare" – 6:09
5. "Du (Rain)" (Gary Bartz) – 3:32
6. "Hymn" – 3:07
7. "Telieledu Rama" (Tyagaraja) – 7:33

== Personnel ==
- Gary Bartz, Lee Konitz, Jackie McLean, Charlie Mariano – alto saxophone
- Joachim Kühn – piano
- Palle Danielsson – bass
- Han Bennink – drums
