= Organic-Lee =

Studio album by Lee Konitz and Gary Versace
- Released: 2006
- Recorded: January 2006
- Genre: Jazz
- Length: 55:18
- Label: SteepleChase; SCCD 31599
- Producer: Nils Winther

Lee Konitz chronology
New Nonet (2005)	Organic-Lee (2006)	Portology (2006)

Gary Versace chronology
Many Places (2005)	Organic-Lee (2006)	Reminiscence (2006)

Organic-Lee is an album by American jazz saxophonist Lee Konitz and organist Gary Versace recorded in 2006 and released on the Danish SteepleChase label.

== Critical reception ==
Professional ratings
Review scores
Source	Rating
All About Jazz	4/5 stars
The Penguin Guide to Jazz Recordings	3/4 stars

Budd Kopman of All About Jazz said "Organic-Lee is an extremely rewarding album on many different levels. The players are very exposed, and their musicianship is not hidden behind drums and bass. I was not prepared for the degree with which the record drew me in, but with each listen, I was further seduced. While both players ventured into the realm of abstraction, it became obvious that Konitz and Versace shared an enormous well of emotion, allowing them to make beautiful music together".

== Track listing ==
1. "Old Folks" (Willard Robison, Dedette Lee Hill) – 5:26
2. "How Long Has This Been Going On" (George Gershwin, Ira Gershwin) – 4:41
3. ""A" Blues" (Lee Konitz) – 6:45
4. "In Your Own Sweet Way" (Dave Brubeck) – 7:25
5. "Giant Steps" (John Coltrane) – 7:10
6. "A Flower Is a Lovesome Thing" (Billy Strayhorn) – 6:52
7. "Sweet and Lovely" (Gus Arnheim, Jules LeMare, Harry Tobias) – 5:20
8. "Come Sunday" (Duke Ellington) – 5:21
9. "My Old Flame" (Sam Coslow, Arthur Johnston) – 6:11

== Personnel ==
- Lee Konitz – alto saxophone
- Gary Versace – Hammond B3 Organ
