= Four Keys =

1979 jazz studio album

Studio album by Martial Solal, Lee Konitz, John Scofield and Niels-Henning Ørsted Pedersen
- Released: 1979
- Recorded: May 8, 1979
- Studios: MPS Tonstudio, Villingen, Black Forest, West Germany
- Genre: Jazz
- Length: 39:12
- Labels: MPS; MPS 15 533
- Producer: Hans Georg Brunner-Schwer

Lee Konitz chronology
Yes, Yes, Nonet (1979)	Four Keys (1979)	Live at Laren (1979)

Martial Solal chronology
Suite for Trio (1978)	Four Keys (1979)	Live at the Berlin Jazz Days 1980 (1980)

John Scofield chronology
Who's Who? (1979)	Four Keys (1979)	Bar Talk (1980)

Niels-Henning Ørsted Pedersen chronology
Pictures (1976)	Four Keys (1979)	Dancing on the Tables (1979)

Four Keys is an album by pianist Martial Solal with saxophonist Lee Konitz, guitarist John Scofield and bassist Niels-Henning Ørsted Pedersen recorded in West Germany in 1979 and released on the MPS label. The album was also released in the US on Pausa Records.

== Critical reception ==
Professional ratings
Review scores
Source	Rating
Allmusic	4.5/5 stars
The Rolling Stone Jazz Record Guide	4/5 stars
DownBeat	4/5 stars

Scott Yanow of Allmusic said "An all-star quartet explores seven diverse Solal originals that range from chamberlike pieces to fairly free group improvising. The results are often exciting if cool in both tone and volume. Thoughtful yet unpredictable music".

== Track listing ==
All compositions by Martial Solal.

1. "Brain Stream" - 6:43
2. "Not Scheduled" - 7:27
3. "Grapes" - 6:26
4. "Retro Active" - 6:03
5. "Energy" - 4:42
6. "Satar" - 4:35
7. "Four Keys" - 3:15

== Personnel ==
- Martial Solal – piano
- Lee Konitz – alto saxophone
- John Scofield – guitar
- Niels-Henning Ørsted Pedersen – bass
