= Dig-It (Lee Konitz and Ted Brown album) =

Studio album by Lee Konitz and Ted Brown
- Released: 1999
- Recorded: May 1999
- Genre: Jazz
- Length: 72:47
- Label: SteepleChase SCCD 31466
- Producer: Nils Winther

Lee Konitz chronology
Sound of Surprise (1999)	Dig-It (1999)	Pride (1999)

Ted Brown chronology
Free Spirit (1989)	Dig-It (1999)	Shades of Brown (2007)

Dig-It is an album by saxophonists Lee Konitz and Ted Brown recorded in 1999 and released on the Danish SteepleChase label.

== Critical reception ==
Professional ratings
Review scores
Source	Rating
The Penguin Guide to Jazz Recordings	3/4 stars

In JazzTimes, Duck Baker wrote: "A less known figure, Brown is nevertheless a wonderful player; his style basically as it was in the ’50s, occupying sort of a middle ground between Warne Marsh and Lester Young. It’s interesting to note the subtle difference in Konitz’s approach here, compared to his work with the like-minded Marsh. ... I’ve always felt that returning to this material brings out the best in Konitz, and it’s great to hear Brown again". On All About Jazz, Marc Corotto noted "This reunion in a pianoless quartet is all about their mentor, Lennie Tristano. His music (their music) of the 1940/50’s paralleled bebop, but in a complex multi-layered way. Tristano was said to have instructed the two to play “...deliberately uninflected, in a neutral tone, concentrating instead on the solo.” This style, reflected on this release, is anything but unemotional. Konitz and Brown’s cool tones create a delicate internal tension that is and was a bridge between Charlie Parker and Ornette Coleman".

== Track listing ==
All compositions by Lee Konitz except where noted

1. "Smog Eyes" (Ted Brown) – 8:28
2. "Dig-It" (Brown) – 8:03
3. "317 E. 32nd Street" (Lennie Tristano) – 7:08
4. "Dream Stepper" – 7:12
5. "Down the Drain" – 4:34
6. "Hi Beck" – 9:38
7. "Featherbed" (Brown) – 9:04
8. "Kary's Trance" – 6:43
9. "Subconscious Lee" – 11:29

== Personnel ==
- Lee Konitz – alto saxophone
- Ted Brown – tenor saxophone
- Ron McClure – bass
- Jeff Williams – drums
