= Jazz à Juan (album) =

Live album by Lee Konitz
- Released: 1977
- Recorded: July 26, 1974
- Venue: Jazz à Juan, Antibes, France
- Genre: Jazz
- Length: 51:05
- Label: SteepleChase; SCS 1072
- Producer: Nils Winther

Lee Konitz chronology
In Concert (1974)	Jazz à Juan (1977)	I Concentrate on You: A Tribute to Cole Porter (1974)

Jazz à Juan is a live album by American jazz saxophonist Lee Konitz recorded in Antibes in 1974 and released on the Danish SteepleChase label in 1977.

== Critical reception ==
Professional ratings
Review scores
Source	Rating
Allmusic	3/5 stars
The Penguin Guide to Jazz Recordings	3.5/4 stars

Scott Yanow of Allmusic said "The quartet performs unpredictable and sometimes eccentric versions of five standards and a previously unissued rendition of Konitz's "Antibes." Solal, whose chord voicings and use of space are quite original, acts as an equal partner with Konitz and the music is often magical and never overly safe. Worth investigating".

== Track listing ==
1. "Antibes" (Lee Konitz) – 9:13 Bonus track on CD reissue
2. "What Is This Thing Called Love?" (Cole Porter) – 10:58
3. "Round About Midnight" (Thelonious Monk) – 10:21
4. "You're a Weaver of Dreams" (Victor Young) – 8:51
5. "The Song Is You" (Jerome Kern) – 8:08
6. "Autumn Leaves" (Joseph Kosma) – 3:32

== Personnel ==
- Lee Konitz – alto saxophone
- Martial Solal – piano
- Niels-Henning Ørsted Pedersen – bass
- Daniel Humair – drums
