= French Concert =

Live album by Shelly Manne Quartet featuring Lee Konitz
- Released: 1979
- Recorded: November 11, 1977; Newport Jazz Festival, Saint-Quentin-en-Yvelines, France
- Genre: Jazz
- Label: Galaxy; GXY 5124
- Producer: Ed Michel

Shelly Manne chronology
Essence (1977)	French Concert (1979)	Double Piano Jazz Quartet (1980)

Lee Konitz chronology
Lee Konitz Nonet (1977)	French Concert (1977)	Duplicity (1977)

French Concert is a live album by the Shelly Manne Quartet featuring Lee Konitz, recorded in Paris by Radio France as part of George Wein's Newport Jazz Festival tour in 1977, and released on the Galaxy label in 1979.

== Critical reception ==
Professional ratings
Review scores
Source	Rating
AllMusic	4.5/5 stars
DownBeat	4/5 stars

Scott Yanow, writing for AllMusic, commented: "This combination of jazzmen works quite well, resulting in music that is both swinging and explorative".

== Track listing ==
1. "Softly, as in a Morning Sunrise" (Sigmund Romberg, Oscar Hammerstein II) – 9:33
2. "Body and Soul" (Johnny Green, Edward Heyman, Robert Sour, Frank Eyton) – 6:30
3. "What Is This Thing Called Love?" (Cole Porter) – 6:48
4. "What's New?" (Bob Haggart, Johnny Burke) – 8:48
5. "Stella by Starlight" (Victor Young, Ned Washington) – 5:38
6. "Take the Coltrane" (Duke Ellington) – 4:00

== Personnel ==
Performances on Specific Tracks based on the Jazz Disco website

- Shelly Manne – drums (All Tracks)
- Lee Konitz – alto saxophone (3-6)
- Mike Wofford – piano (All Tracks)
- Chuck Domanico – bass (All Tracks)
