= Yes, Yes, Nonet =

Studio album by Lee Konitz Nonet
- Released: 1979
- Recorded: April 17, 1979
- Genre: Jazz
- Length: 40:11
- Label: SteepleChase; SCS 1119
- Producer: Nils Winther

Lee Konitz chronology
Tenorlee (1977–78)	Yes, Yes, Nonet (1979)	Four Keys (1979)

Yes, Yes, Nonet is an album by the American jazz band Lee Konitz Nonet, recorded in 1979 and released on the Danish SteepleChase label.

== Critical reception ==
Professional ratings
Review scores
Source	Rating
AllMusic	4.5/5 stars
The Penguin Guide to Jazz Recordings	3/4 stars
The Rolling Stone Jazz Record Guide	4/5 stars

The Globe and Mail determined that "the intermediate size of the band, neither small nor big, allows its character to come as much from the personalities of its members as the instruments they play."

Scott Yanow on AllMusic noted: "It's an excellent outing from a somewhat neglected group".

== Track listing ==
All compositions by Jimmy Knepper except where noted.

1. "Dearth of a Nation" – 6:05
2. "Languid" – 6:13
3. "Footprints" (Wayne Shorter) – 8:04
4. "Stardust" (Hoagy Carmichael, Mitchell Parish) – 5:13
5. "Primrose Path" – 6:32
6. "Noche Triste" – 4:33
7. "My Buddy" (Walter Donaldson, Gus Kahn) – 3:31

== Personnel ==
- Lee Konitz – alto saxophone, soprano saxophone
- John Eckert, Tom Harrell – trumpet, flugelhorn
- Jimmy Knepper – trombone
- Sam Burtis – bass trombone
- Ronnie Cuber – baritone saxophone, soprano saxophone
- Harold Danko – piano
- Buster Williams – bass
- Billy Hart – drums
