= Martial Solal =

French jazz pianist and composer (1927–2024)

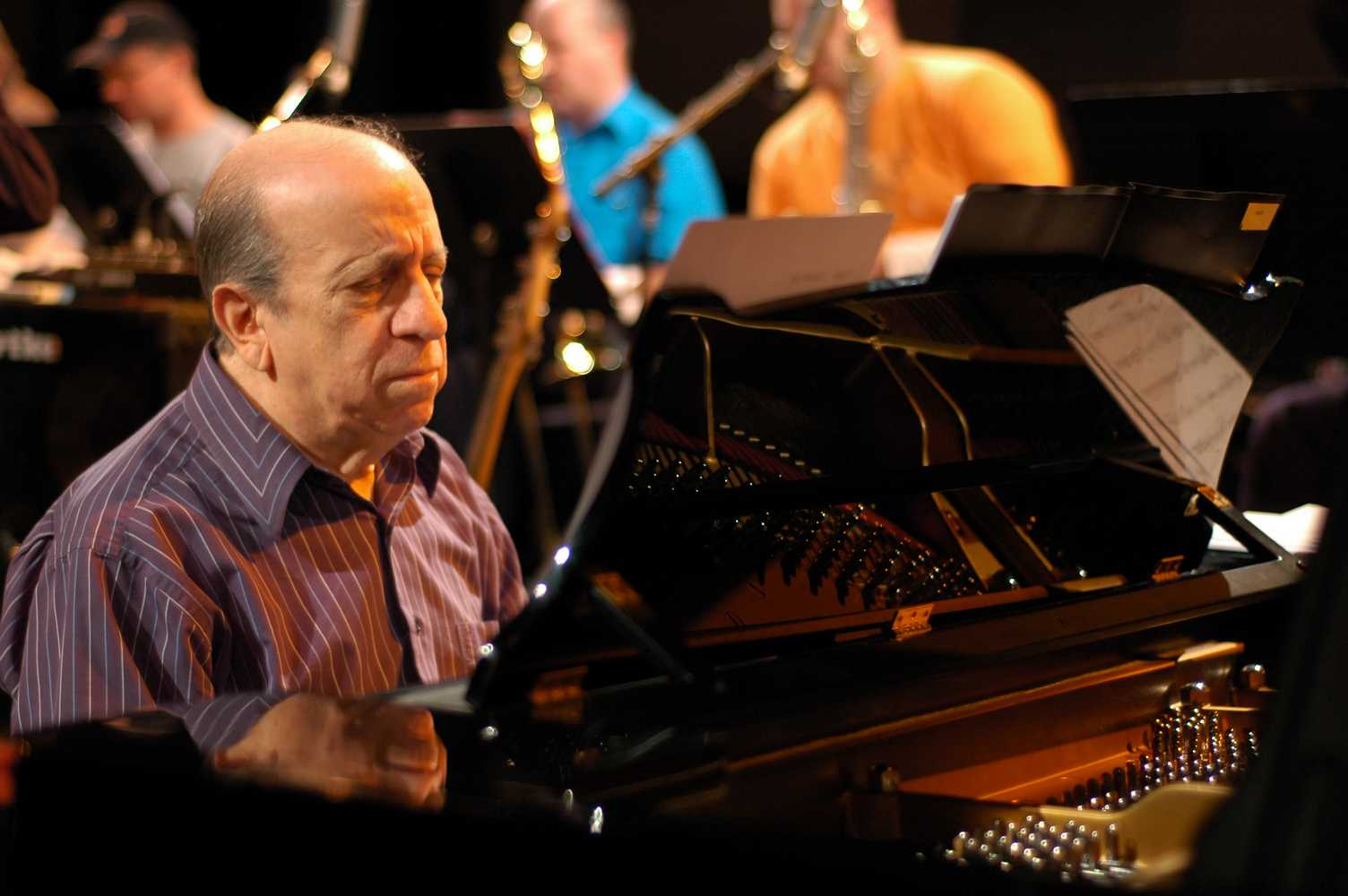
- Solal performs with his Newdecaband in 2006.

Background information
- Born: 23 August 1927; Algiers, French Algeria
- Died: 12 December 2024 (aged 97) Versailles, Yvelines, France
- Genres: Jazz, classical
- Occupations: Musician, composer
- Instrument: Piano
- Years active: 1950s–2019

Martial Solal (23 August 1927 – 12 December 2024) was a French jazz pianist and composer.

== Life and career ==
Solal was born in Algiers, French Algeria on 23 August 1927, to Algerian Jewish parents. He was persuaded to study clarinet, saxophone, and piano by his mother, who was an opera singer. He was expelled from school in 1942 because of his parents' Jewish ancestry (Algeria was a French colony, and the Vichy regime in France was following Nazi policies). Solal educated himself after having studied classical music in school. He imitated music he heard on the radio. When he was 15, he performed publicly for United States Army audiences.

After settling in Paris in 1950, he began working with Django Reinhardt and U.S. expatriates such as Sidney Bechet and Don Byas. He formed a quartet (occasionally also leading a big band) in the late 1950s, although he had been recording as a leader since 1953. Solal then began composing film music, eventually providing over 20 scores. He composed music for Jean-Luc Godard's debut feature film Breathless (À bout de souffle, 1960).

In 1963, he made an appearance at the Newport Jazz Festival in Rhode Island; the Newport '63 album purporting to be a recording of this gig is actually a studio recreation with overdubbed applause, as documented in the sleeve notes of some later reissues. At this time, his trio included bassist Guy Pedersen and drummer Daniel Humair. From 1968, he performed and recorded with Lee Konitz in Europe and the U.S.

In its January 2011 issue, The Gruppen Review published a 12-page interview in which Solal discusses his work as an eternal "researcher in jazz".

Solal died in Versailles, Yvelines on 12 December 2024, at the age of 97.

== Style ==
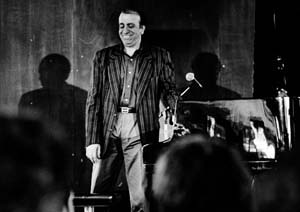
1988

His jazz approach was once described by Jean-Pierre Thiollet as "brilliant, unique and intellectual" He has said of his technique: "You have to make people believe that it's very easy, even when it's very difficult. If you look to have trouble with the technique, it is no good. You must play the most difficult thing like this."

== Discography ==
=== Leader ===
- 1954: French Modern Sounds (Swing/Disques Vogue)
- 1954: Martial Solal Trio (Disques Vogue)
- 1959: Suite en ré bémol pour quartette de jazz (Columbia) (7")
- 1960: Martial Solal (Columbia; US release by Capitol)
- 1962: Jazz à Gaveau (Columbia); US release as In Concert/Trio in Concert (Liberty, 1963)
- 1962: Suite pour une frise (Pathé-Marconi)
- 1963: At Newport '63 (RCA)
- 1963: Martial Solal and the European All Stars (Telefunken; Canada release by London)
- 1964: Concert à Gaveau vol. 2 (Columbia)
- 1965: Martial Solal "Trio" (Columbia)
- 1965: En Liberte (Columbia) (with Gilbert Rovere and Charles Bellonzi)
- 1965: Son 66 (Columbia)
- 1966: En Direct Du Blue Note (Columbia; US release in 1969 as On Home Ground by Milestone)
- 1970: Locomotion (PSI, imprint of Musique Pour L'Image) (with Henry Texier and Bernard Lubat)
- 1970: Sans tambour ni trompette (RCA Victor)
- 1975: 7 + 4 = X (PDU)
- 1975: Nothing but Piano (MPS)
- 1978: Suite for Trio (Universal)
- 1981: Big Band (Universal)
- 1983: Bluesine (Soul Note)
- 1984: Big Band (Dreyfus Jazz)
- 1984: Plays Hodeir (OMDCD)
- 1991: Triptyque (Adda)
- 1991: Duo in Paris (Dreyfus Jazz)
- 1995: Triangle (JMS)
- 1996: Difficult Blues (John Marks Records)
- 1997: Just Friends (Dreyfus)
- 1998: Silent Cinema – Cinema Muet (Gorgone)
- 1998: Martial Solal, Vol. 2 (Vogue)
- 1999: Balade du 10 mars (Soul Note)
- 1999: En Solo (Fresh Sound)
- 1999: Contrastes (Storyville)
- 2000: Martial Solal Dodecaband Plays Ellington (Dreyfus Jazz)
- 2003: NY-1: Live at the Village Vanguard (Blue Note)
- 2007: Exposition sans tableau (Nocturne)
- 2007: Solitude (CAM Jazz)
- 2008: Longitude (CAM Jazz)
- 2009: Live at the Village Vanguard (CAM Jazz)
- 2015: Works for Piano and Two Pianos (Grand Piano)
- 2018: Histoires improvisées (paroles et musiques) (JMS)
- 2018: My One and Only Love (Intuition Records)
- 2021: Coming Yesterday : Live at Salle Gaveau 2019 (Challenge records)

=== Co-leader ===
- 1957: When a Soprano Meets a Piano with Sidney Bechet (Inner City)
- 1965: Zoller Koller Solal with Attila Zoller and Hans Koller (MPS)
- 1968: European Episode with Lee Konitz (Campi)
- 1968: Impressive Rome with Lee Konitz (Campi)
- 1968: Électrode : Martial Solal joue Michel Magne (Ducretet Thomson)
- 1976: Movability with Niels-Henning Ørsted Pedersen (MPS)
- 1977: Duplicity with Lee Konitz (Horo)
- 1979: Four Keys (MPS)
- 1980: Live at the Berlin Jazz Days 1980 with Lee Konitz (MPS)
- 1980: Happy Reunion with Stéphane Grappelli (Sunnyside)
- 1983: Star Eyes, Hamburg 1983 with Lee Konitz (HatOLOGY)
- 1988: 9/11 p.m. Town Hall (Label Bleu)
- 1992: Martial Solal & Toots Thielemans (Erato)
- 1999: Fast Mood with Michel Portal (BMG France)
- 2000: In and Out with Johnny Griffin (Dreyfus Jazz)
- 2000: Portrait in Black and White with Éric Le Lann (Nocturne, H&L)
- 2006: Rue de Seine with Dave Douglas (CAM Jazz)
- 2017: Masters in Bordeaux, with Dave Liebman (Sunnyside)
- 2020: Masters in Paris, with Dave Liebman (Sunnyside)

=== Sideman ===
- 1974: Jazz à Juan (SteepleChase)
- 2005: Comptines Pour Enfants Seulement (Doumtak)
