= Lone-Lee =

Studio album by Lee Konitz
- Released: 1975
- Recorded: August 15, 1974
- Studio: Sound Track, Copenhagen
- Genre: Jazz
- Length: 37:15 (LP); 56:28 (CD)
- Label: SteepleChase; SCS 1035
- Producer: Nils Winther

Lee Konitz chronology
I Concentrate on You: A Tribute to Cole Porter (1974)	Lone-Lee (1975)	Satori (1974)

Lone-Lee is a solo album by American jazz saxophonist Lee Konitz, recorded in Denmark in 1974 and released on the Danish SteepleChase label. The original LP, released in 1975, featured an edited take of "The Song Is You" lasting 19 minutes, while the 1987 CD release featured the complete unedited take.

== Critical reception ==
Professional ratings
Review scores
Source	Rating
Allmusic	3/5 stars
The Penguin Guide to Jazz Recordings	3.5/4 stars

Scott Yanow of Allmusic said, "This is an unusual release, for it features altoist Lee Konitz playing unaccompanied ... in swinging but relaxed and fairly free fashion. The improvisations are quite thoughtful and logical yet avoid being predictable and hold onto one's interest throughout".

== Track listing ==
1. "The Song Is You" (Jerome Kern, Oscar Hammerstein II) – 38:41 (Edited to 19:25 on LP)
2. "Cherokee" (Ray Noble) – 17:47

== Personnel ==
- Lee Konitz – alto saxophone
