= 1940s in jazz =

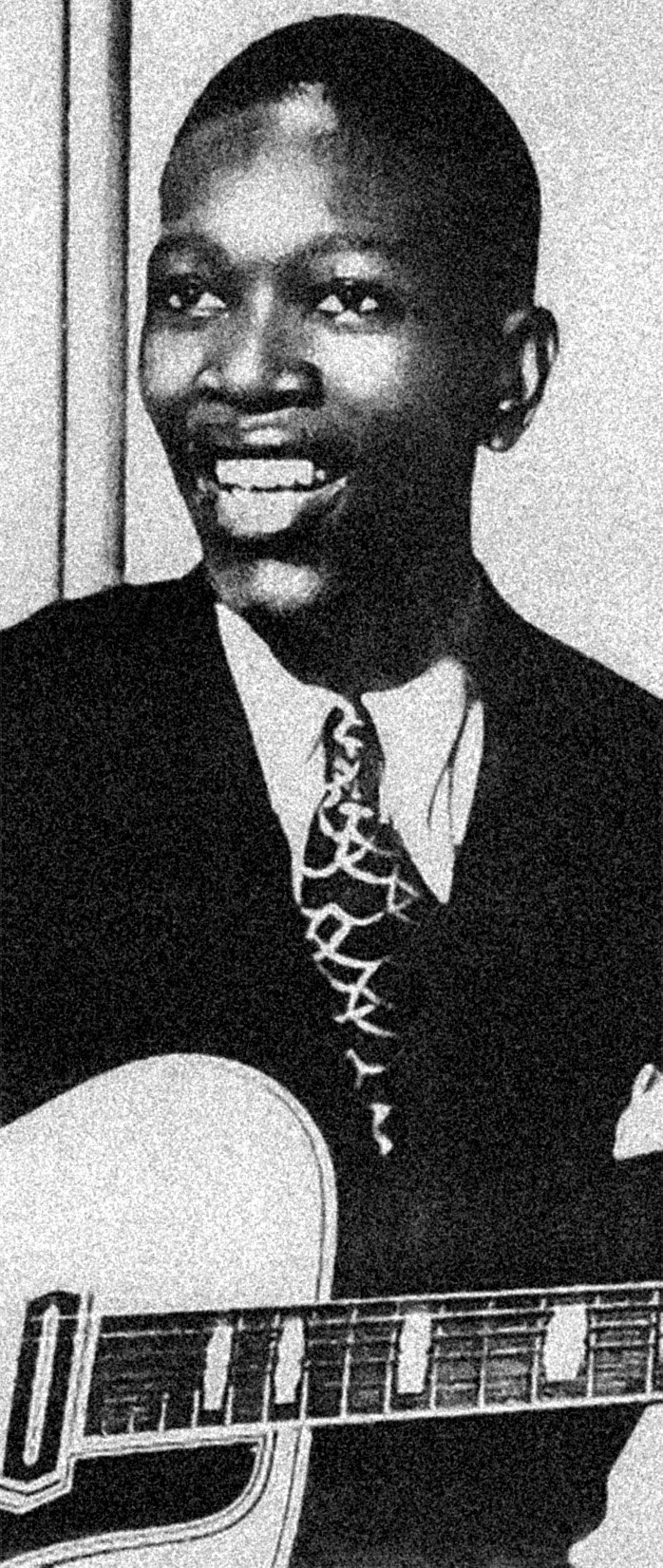
Charlie Christian

In the early 1940s in jazz, bebop emerged, led by Charlie Parker, Dizzy Gillespie, Thelonious Monk and others. It helped to shift jazz from danceable popular music towards a more challenging "musician's music." Differing greatly from swing, early bebop divorced itself from dance music, establishing itself more as an art form but lessening its potential popular and commercial value. Since bebop was meant to be listened to, not danced to, it used faster tempos. Beboppers introduced new forms of chromaticism and dissonance into jazz; the dissonant tritone (or "flatted fifth") interval became the "most important interval of bebop" and players engaged in a more abstracted form of chord-based improvisation which used "passing" chords, substitute chords, and altered chords. The style of drumming shifted as well to a more elusive and explosive style, in which the ride cymbal was used to keep time, while the snare and bass drum were used for accents. This appealed to a more specialized audiences than earlier forms of jazz, with sophisticated harmonies, fast tempos and often virtuoso musicianship. Bebop musicians often used 1930s standards, especially those from Broadway musicals, as part of their repertoire.

Among standards written by bebop musicians are Gillespie's "Salt Peanuts" (1941) and "A Night in Tunisia" (1942), Parker's "Anthropology" (1946), "Yardbird Suite" (1946) and "Scrapple from the Apple" (1947), and Monk's "'Round Midnight" (1944), which is currently the most recorded jazz standard composed by a jazz musician.

An early 1940s style known as "jumping the blues" or jump blues used small combos, uptempo music, and blues chord progressions. Jump blues drew on boogie-woogie from the 1930s. Kansas City Jazz in the 1930s as exemplified by tenor saxophonist Lester Young marked the transition from big bands to the bebop influence of the 1940s.

These divergences from the jazz mainstream of the time initially met with a divided, sometimes hostile response among fans and fellow musicians, especially established swing players, who bristled at the new harmonic sounds. To hostile critics, bebop seemed to be filled with "racing, nervous phrases". Despite the initial friction, by the 1950s bebop had become an accepted part of the jazz vocabulary. The most influential bebop musicians included saxophonist Charlie Parker, pianists Bud Powell and Thelonious Monk, trumpeters Dizzy Gillespie and Clifford Brown, and drummer Max Roach.

The swing era lasted until the mid-1940s, and produced popular tunes such as Duke Ellington's "Cotton Tail" (1940) and Billy Strayhorn's "Take the 'A' Train" (1941). When the big bands struggled to keep going during World War II, a shift was happening in jazz in favor of smaller groups. Some swing era musicians, like Louis Jordan, later found popularity in a new kind of music, called "rhythm and blues", that would evolve into rock and roll in the 1950s.

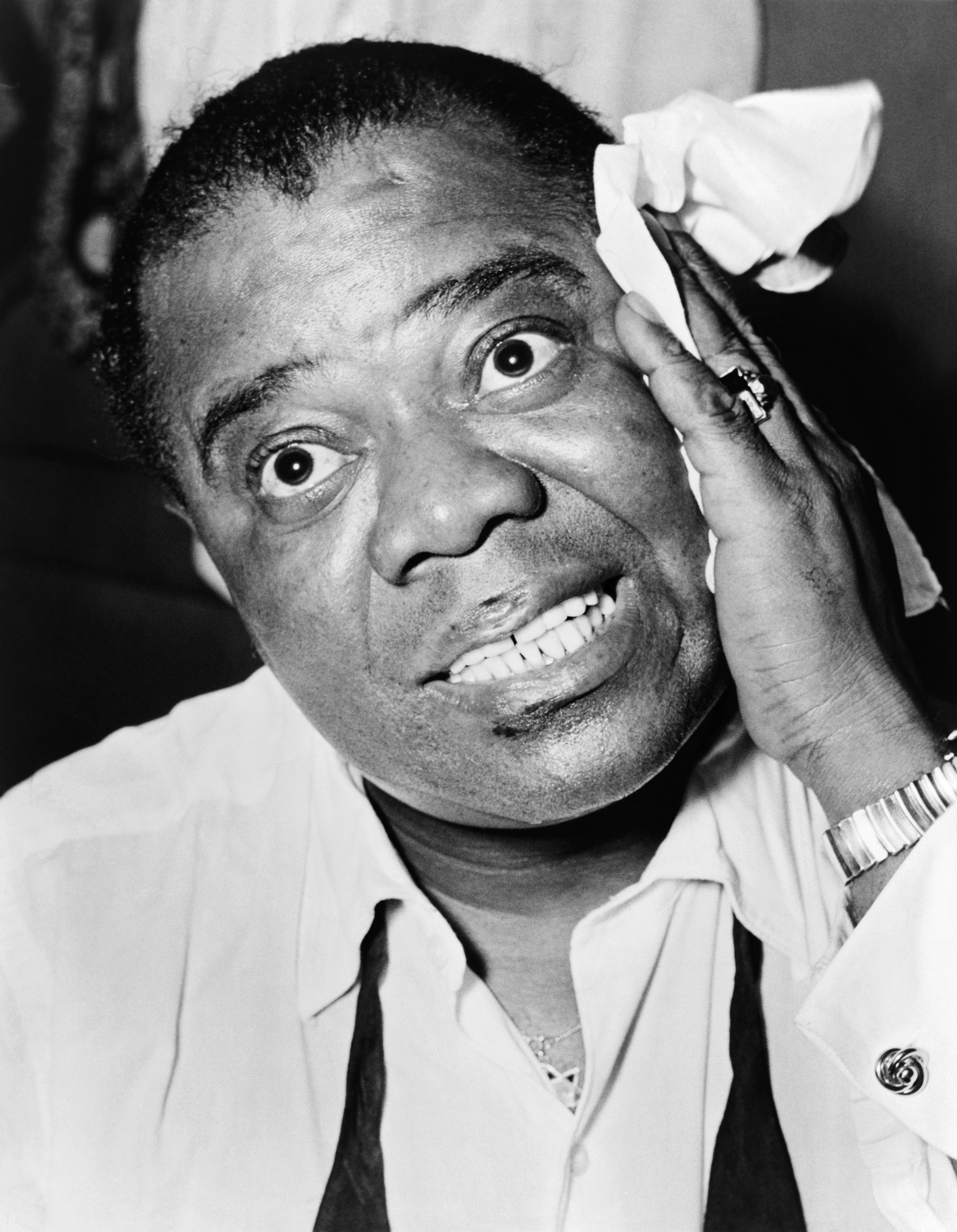
Louis Armstrong

In the late 1940s there was a revival of "Dixieland" music, harkening back to the original contrapuntal New Orleans style. This was driven in large part by record company reissues of early jazz classics by the Oliver, Morton, and Armstrong bands of the 1930s. There were two populations of musicians involved in the revival. One group consisted of players who had begun their careers playing in the traditional style, and were either returning to it, or continuing what they had been playing all along, such as Bob Crosby's Bobcats, Max Kaminsky, Eddie Condon, and Wild Bill Davison. Most of this group were originally Midwesterners, although there were a small number of New Orleans musicians involved. The second population of revivalists consisted of young musicians such as the Lu Watters band. By the late 1940s, Louis Armstrong's Allstars band became a leading ensemble. Through the 1950s and 1960s, Dixieland was one of the most commercially popular jazz styles in the US, Europe, and Japan, although critics paid little attention to it.

By the end of the 1940s, the nervous energy and tension of bebop was replaced with a tendency towards calm and smoothness, with the sounds of cool jazz, which favoured long, linear melodic lines. It emerged in New York City, as a result of the mixture of the styles of predominantly white jazz musicians and black bebop musicians, and it dominated jazz in the first half of the 1950s. The starting point were a series of singles on Capitol Records in 1949 and 1950 of a nonet led by trumpeter Miles Davis, collected and released first on a ten-inch and later a twelve-inch as the Birth of the Cool. Cool jazz recordings by Chet Baker, Dave Brubeck, Bill Evans, Gil Evans, Stan Getz and the Modern Jazz Quartet usually have a "lighter" sound which avoided the aggressive tempos and harmonic abstraction of bebop. Cool jazz later became strongly identified with the West Coast jazz scene, but also had a particular resonance in Europe, especially Scandinavia, with emergence of such major figures as baritone saxophonist Lars Gullin and pianist Bengt Hallberg. The theoretical underpinnings of cool jazz were set out by the blind Chicago pianist Lennie Tristano, and its influence stretches into such later developments as Bossa nova, modal jazz, and even free jazz. See also the list of cool jazz and West Coast musicians for further detail.

== 1940 ==
=== Album releases ===
- Duke Ellington: In A Mellotone
- Duke Ellington: Sophisticated Lady

=== Births ===
- Dave Burrell (September 10, 1940), pianist
- Eddie Henderson (October 26, 1940), trumpet and flugelhorn player
- Pharoah Sanders (October 13, 1940), saxophonist

=== Deaths ===
- Johnny Dodds (April 12, 1892 – August 8, 1940)

== 1941 ==
=== Births ===
- Bobby Hutcherson (January 27, 1941), vibraphone and marimba player
- Palle Mikkelborg (March 6, 1941), trumpeter
- Airto Moreira (August 5, 1941), drummer and percussionist

== 1942 ==
=== Births ===
- John McLaughlin (January 4, 1942-), guitarist
- Jack DeJohnette (August 9, 1942), drummer
- Marlena Shaw (September 22, 1942), singer

=== Deaths ===
- Charlie Christian (July 29, 1916 – March 2, 1942), guitarist
- Bunny Berigan (November 2, 1908 – June 2, 1942)

== 1943 ==
=== Events ===
The American Federation of Musicians recording ban, called by James Petrillo, continued through 1943.

=== Album releases ===
- Duke Ellington: Black, Brown and Beige (1943)

=== Births ===
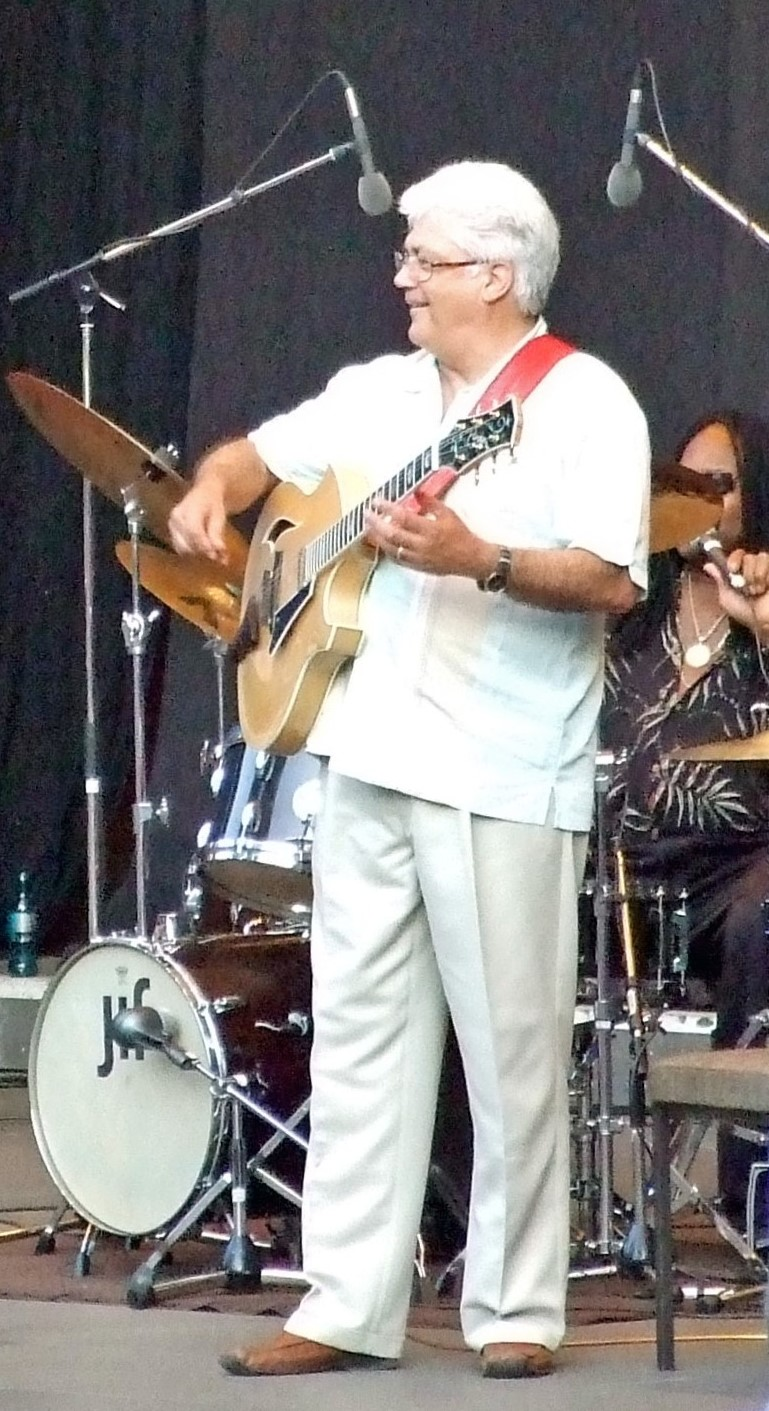
Larry Coryell

- Larry Coryell (April 2, 1943-), guitarist
- Kenny Barron (June 9, 1943), pianist
- Michał Urbaniak (January 22, 1943)

=== Deaths ===
- Fats Waller (May 21, 1904 - December 15, 1943)

== 1944 ==
=== Album releases ===
- Coleman Hawkins - Rainbow Mist (1944)

=== Births ===
- Don Sickler (January 6, 1944 -), trumpeter
- Ron Mathewson (February 19, 1944), double bassist
- Eddie Gómez (October 4, 1944), double bassist

=== Deaths ===
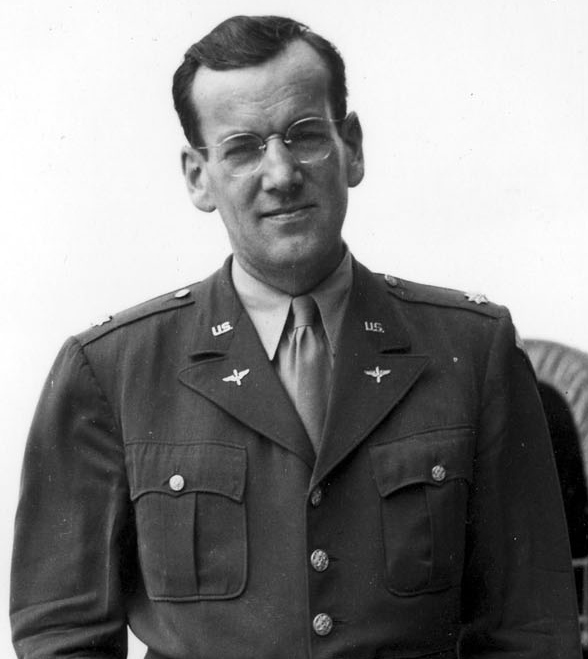
Glenn Miller

- Glenn Miller (March 1, 1904 – missing December 15, 1944), musician and composer
- Jimmie Noone (April 23, 1895 – April 19, 1944)

== 1945 ==
=== Album releases ===
- Mary Lou Williams: Zodiac Suite (1945)
- John Serry Sr.: Leone Jump Single on Sonora Records

=== Births ===
- Keith Jarrett (May 8, 1945 -), pianist
- Henri Texier (January 27, 1945), double bassist

=== Deaths ===
- Pha Terrell (May 25, 1910 - October 14, 1945)

== 1946 ==
=== Births ===
- Digby Fairweather (April 25, 1946)
- Bennie Wallace (November 18, 1946)

== 1947 ==
=== Album releases ===
- Dexter Gordon and Teddy Edwards: The Duel
- John Serry Sr. and Joe Biviano: Accordion Capers - featuring the Biviano Accordion & Rhythm Sextette

== 1948 ==
=== Album releases ===
- Coleman Hawkins: Picasso

=== Births ===
- Larry Carlton (March 1, 1948 -), guitarist
- Richie Cole (February 29, 1948), alto saxophonist
- Jessica Williams (March 17, 1948), pianist and composer

== 1949 ==
=== Album releases ===
- Lennie Tristano: Crosscurrents (1949)
- Duke Ellington: Liberian Suite (1949)
- Lee Konitz: Subconscious-Lee (1949)
- Bob Wilber: Jazz Band (1949)

=== Deaths ===
- Albert Ammons (September 23, 1907 — December 2, 1949)

== See also ==
- List of 1940s jazz standards

== Bibliography ==
- The New Real Book, Volume I. Sher Music. 1988. ISBN 0-9614701-4-3.
- The New Real Book, Volume II. Sher Music. 1991. ISBN 0-9614701-7-8.
- The New Real Book, Volume III. Sher Music. 1995. ISBN 1-883217-30-X.
- The Real Book, Volume I (6th ed.). Hal Leonard. 2004. ISBN 0-634-06038-4.
- The Real Book, Volume II (2nd ed.). Hal Leonard. 2007. ISBN 1-4234-2452-2.
- The Real Book, Volume III (2nd ed.). Hal Leonard. 2006. ISBN 0-634-06136-4.
- The Real Jazz Book. Warner Bros. ISBN 978-91-85041-36-7.
- The Real Vocal Book, Volume I. Hal Leonard. 2006. ISBN 0-634-06080-5.
