= Lennie Tristano (album) =

Studio album by Lennie Tristano
- Released: February 1956
- Recorded: 1954–55; June 11, 1955
- Genre: Jazz
- Labels: Atlantic, London

Lennie Tristano chronology
Descent into the Maelstrom (1952)	Lennie Tristano (1956)	New York Improvisations (1956)

Professional ratings
Review scores
Source	Rating
AllMusic	4.5/5 stars
The Penguin Guide to Jazz Recordings	4/4 stars

Lennie Tristano, also known as Tristano, is a 1956 album by jazz pianist Lennie Tristano. At its release, the album was controversial for its innovative use of technology, with Tristano overdubbing piano and manipulating tape speed for effect on the first four tracks.

The final five songs are concert recordings. Originally released as Tristano's Atlantic Records debut, the album was released on CD in 1994 by Rhino Records in combined form with Tristano's 1960 follow-up, The New Tristano, and as part of a collection, The Complete Atlantic Recordings of Lennie Tristano, Lee Konitz & Warne Marsh, in 1997. It was subsequently re-issued in original form and track-list order by Warner Jazz (2002), Rhino (2003) and Collectables (2004).

== Controversial innovation ==
According to Ira Gitler in The Masters of Be-Bop, the overdubbing and tape speed manipulation on this album unleashed a furor. Tristano had begun experimenting in 1951, when he had additional piano tracks, some of which had been speeded up by engineer Rudy van Gelder, added to his recording of the songs "Ju Ju" and "Pastime". Tristano later recalled that not a single reviewer questioned the multitracking of those songs when they were released in 1952. According to Tristano, questions began to arise six months to a year later. At the time, Tristano declined to discuss it. In an interview years later, he described a private incident where Leonard Bernstein and Willie Kapell debated the topic in his home. After Bernstein declared his certainty that the songs were multitracked, Kapell demonstrated that the speed was possible by playing a Mozart tune 16 times faster than it would generally be played.

Following the release of Lennie Tristano, the usage of multitracking and tape speed was widely questioned and criticized on the songs "Line Up", "Turkish Mambo" and "East Thirty-Second". In the case of "Turkish Mambo", Tristano played three separate and conflicting piano tracks, with left-hand rhythms of five, six and seven beats beneath right-hand improvisation. Tristano made specific reference to that song in defending his choice, stating that "[i]f I do multiple tapes, I don't feel I'm a phony thereby. Take "The Turkish Mambo". There is no other way I could do it so that I could get the rhythms to go together the way I feel them."

On the question of tape speed, he added, "If people want to think I speeded up the piano on "Line Up" and "East Thirty-Second", I don't care. What I care about is that the result sounded good to me." Contributing bassist Peter Ind, inspired to later use the same technique on his own album Looking Out, argued on the contrary to those who feel this is a deceptive technique that it is simply another tool an artist may use to craft his work.

Though controversial immediately on release, Tristano's decision to use the technique was described in 1997 by The New York Times as "celebrated".

== Reception ==
In 1997, The New York Times dubbed the album a masterpiece. Thom Jurek from AllMusic described the album as "gorgeous [...] with a beautiful juxtaposition between its first and second halves, with the rhythmic and intervallic genius of Tristano as an improviser on full display during the first half and the pianist as a supreme lyrical and swinging harmonist during the back half."

The Penguin Guide to Jazz Recordings included the album in its suggested "core collection" of essential recordings.

== Track listing ==
All tracks composed by Lennie Tristano, except where noted.

1. "Line Up" – 3:34
2. "Requiem" – 4:53
3. "Turkish Mambo" – 3:41
4. "East Thirty-Second" – 4:33
5. "These Foolish Things" (Harry Link, Holt Marvell, Jack Strachey) – 5:46
6. "You Go to My Head" (J. Fred Coots, Haven Gillespie) – 5:20
7. "If I Had You" (Jimmy Campbell, Reginald Connelly, Ted Shapiro) – 6:29
8. "I Don't Stand a Ghost of a Chance With You" (Bing Crosby, Ned Washington, Victor Young) – 6:07
9. "All the Things You Are" (Oscar Hammerstein II, Jerome Kern) – 6:11

== Personnel ==
Lennie Tristano's home studio, New York, 1954–1955

- Tracks 1–4
  - Lennie Tristano – piano
  - Peter Ind – bass (tracks: 1, 4)
  - Jeff Morton – drums (tracks: 1, 4)

The Sing-Song Room, Confucius Restaurant, New York, June 11, 1955

- Tracks 5–9
  - Lennie Tristano – piano
  - Lee Konitz – alto saxophone
  - Gene Ramey – bass
  - Art Taylor – drums

Design

- Barry Ulanov – liner notes
- Jay Maisel – artwork
