= You and Lee =

Studio album by Lee Konitz
- Released: 1959
- Recorded: October 29–30, 1959; New York City
- Genre: Jazz
- Label: Verve; MGV 8362

Lee Konitz chronology
Lee Konitz Meets Jimmy Giuffre (1959)	You and Lee (1959)	Motion (1961)

You and Lee is an album by American jazz saxophonist Lee Konitz which was released on the Verve label in 1959.

== Critical reception ==
Professional ratings
Review scores
Source	Rating
AllMusic	3/5 stars

Scott Yanow of Allmusic states "One of the lesser-known Lee Konitz albums, this LP features the altoist joined by six brass and a rhythm section for eight Jimmy Giuffre arrangements. The shouting brass contrasts well with Konitz's cool-toned solos and together they perform eight underplayed standards".

== Track listing ==
1. "Everything I've Got (Belongs to You)" (Richard Rodgers, Lorenz Hart) – 4:44
2. "You Don't Know What Love Is" (Gene de Paul, Don Raye) – 4:19
3. "You're Driving Me Crazy" (Walter Donaldson) – 4:10
4. " I Didn't Know About You" (Duke Ellington, Bob Russell) – 4:00
5. "(You're Clear) Out of This World" (Harold Arlen, Johnny Mercer) – 4:05
6. "The More I See You" (Harry Warren, Mack Gordon) – 3:38
7. "You Are Too Beautiful" (Rodgers, Hart) – 4:05
8. "I'm Getting Sentimental Over You" (George Bassman, Ned Washington) – 4:04

== Personnel ==
- Lee Konitz – alto saxophone
- Marky Markowitz – trumpet
- Ernie Royal – trumpet
- Phil Sunkel – trumpet
- Eddie Bert – trombone
- Billy Byers – trombone
- Bob Brookmeyer – valve trombone
- Bill Evans – piano (tracks 1, 2, 4 & 8)
- Jim Hall – guitar (tracks 3 & 5–7)
- Sonny Dallas – bass
- Roy Haynes – drums
- Jimmy Giuffre – arranger, conductor
