= The New Tristano =

Studio album by Lennie Tristano
- Released: February 1962
- Recorded: 1961
- Genre: Jazz
- Length: 36:32
- Label: Atlantic 1357

Professional ratings
Review scores
Source	Rating
AllMusic	4/5 stars
Down Beat	5/5 stars

The New Tristano is an album by jazz pianist Lennie Tristano. It was recorded in 1961 and was released by Atlantic Records in February 1962.

== Background ==
Lennie Tristano seldom recorded; this was his first album for Atlantic Records since his eponymous album was released in 1956. That album had been controversial for its use of overdubbing and tape speed alteration; the cover of The New Tristano album contained the words "Lennie Tristano is heard on this LP in unaccompanied piano solos. No use is made of multi-tracking, overdubbing, or tape-speeding on any selection."

== Recording and Music ==
The album consists of seven solo piano tracks – six are Tristano originals; the other is the standard "You Don't Know What Love Is". The Tristano compositions are "based on standards: 'Becoming' ('What Is This Thing Called Love?'), 'Deliberation' ('Indiana'), 'Scene and Variations' ('My Melancholy Baby'), 'Love Lines' ('Foolin' Myself'), and 'G Minor Complex' ('You'd Be So Nice to Come Home To')."

The performances are largely improvised. Most of the tracks contain left-hand bass lines that provide structure to each performance as well as counterpoint for the right-hand playing; block chords, unclear harmonies and contrasting rhythms also appear. "Scene and Variations" differs, particularly in its third part, which does not feature a walking bass line.

== Reception ==
Critic Ira Gitler stated that the album is "a remarkable tour de force". Pianist Alan Broadbent described The New Tristano as "the greatest solo jazz piano album bar none." The Penguin Guide to Jazz indicated that, "Howsoever the conjoining of technique, interpretation and feeling may work for the listener, this is remarkable piano jazz, and the contrasting ballads of 'You Don't Know What Love Is' and 'Love Lines' suggest a world of expression which jazz has seldom looked at since."

== Track listing ==
All songs composed by Lennie Tristano, unless otherwise noted.

1. "Becoming"
2. "C Minor Complex"
3. "You Don't Know What Love Is" (Gene de Paul, Don Raye)
4. "Deliberation"
5. "Scene and Variations: Carol/Tania/Bud"
6. "Love Lines"
7. "G Minor Complex"

== Personnel ==
=== Musicians ===
- Lennie Tristano – piano

=== Production ===
- Lennie Tristano – recording engineering
- Lee Friedlander – cover photography
- Loring Eutemey – cover design
- Barry Ulanov – liner notes
