= Denzil Best =

American jazz drummer (1917–1965)

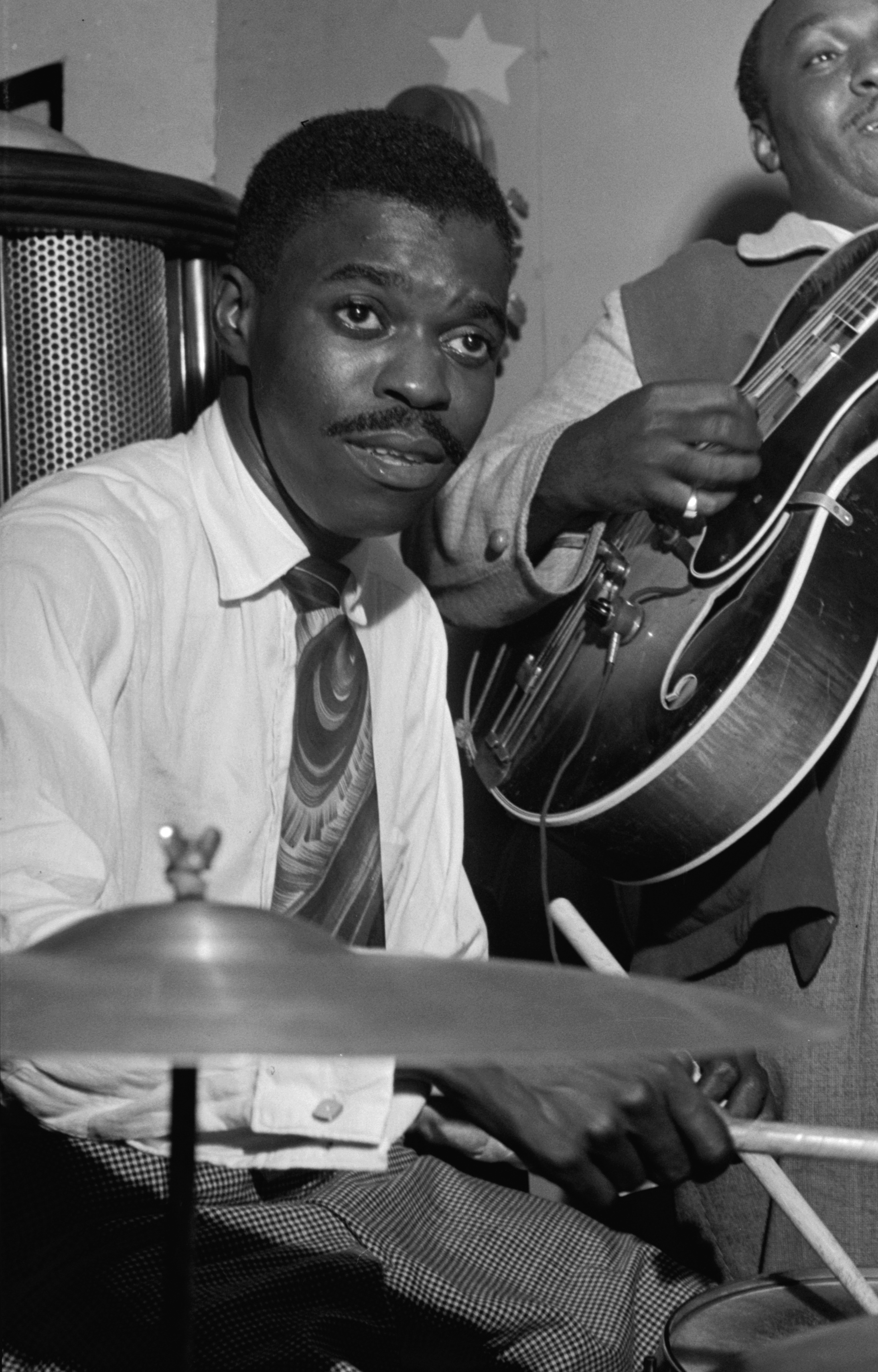

Background information
- Birth name: Denzil DaCosta Best
- Born: April 27, 1917; New York City, U.S.
- Died: May 24, 1965 (aged 48); New York City, U.S.
- Genres: Bebop
- Occupation(s): Percussionist, composer

Denzil DaCosta Best (April 27, 1917 – May 24, 1965) was an American jazz percussionist and composer born in New York City. He was a prominent bebop drummer in the 1950s and early 1960s.

== Biography ==
Best was born in New York City, into a musical Caribbean family originally from Barbados. Trained on piano, trumpet, and bass, he concentrated on the drums starting in 1943. Between 1943 and 1944, he worked with Ben Webster, and subsequently with Coleman Hawkins (1944–45), Illinois Jacquet (1946) and Chubby Jackson. The drummer was known to sit in at Minton's Playhouse. He took part in a recording with George Shearing in 1948 and was a founding member of his Quartet, remaining there until 1952. In 1949, he played on a recording session with Lennie Tristano for Capitol and also recorded later with Lee Konitz.

In a 1953 car accident he fractured both legs and was forced into temporary retirement until 1954, when he played with Artie Shaw, and then in a trio with Erroll Garner (1955–57), including Garner's live album Concert by the Sea. Best subsequently played with Phineas Newborn, Nina Simone, Billie Holiday and Tyree Glenn, and in October 1962 appeared on the first album by Sheila Jordan (Portrait of Sheila). He suffered from paralysis after this and was no longer able to play; he died aged 48 in 1965, after falling down a staircase in a New York City Subway station.

== Compositions ==
Best composed several bebop tunes, including "Move" (which was featured in an arrangement by John Lewis on the seminal 1949 & 1950 recordings released in 1957 on the Miles Davis Capitol album, Birth of the Cool), "Wee", "Nothing but D. Best", and "Dee Dee's Dance", and with Thelonious Monk, "Bemsha Swing". Best's composition "45 Degree Angle" was recorded by Herbie Nichols and Mary Lou Williams.

== Influence ==
Unlike many bebop percussionists, who loaded the musical space with accents against the prevailing meter and thus created rhythmic intensity, Best resumed the legato development of Jo Jones. He played on the beat and rarely used loud accents. Playing in this way he was not only a model for cool jazz but also influenced countless bar combos. Best was renowned for his brush work: fellow drummer Jake Hanna said that he "might be the best brush player of all drummers", and Elvin Jones listed Best in his top three.

== Discography ==
With Erroll Garner

- Concert by the Sea (Columbia, 1955)

With Sheila Jordan

- Portrait of Sheila (Blue Note, 1962)

With Lee Konitz

- Subconscious-Lee (Prestige, 1950)

With Phineas Newborn, Jr.

- Fabulous Phineas (RCA Victor, 1958)

With Seldon Powell

- We Paid Our Dues! (Epic, 1961)

With Lennie Tristano

- Crosscurrents (Capitol, 1949 [1972])
