= Intuition (free improvisation) =

Improvisation by Lennie Tristano quintet

"Intuition" is the title of a free improvisation by the Lennie Tristano quintet. It was recorded on May 16, 1949, and is credited as being one of the first two freely improvised jazz recordings, along with "Digression" (made at the same session).

== Background ==
Pianist Lennie Tristano recalled that, "When I was seven we got a phonograph. I would listen to the old jazz records and then just sit at the piano and play anything – no particular tune."

The quintet that recorded "Intuition" was formed of leader Tristano, tenor saxophonist Warne Marsh, alto saxophonist Lee Konitz, guitarist Billy Bauer, and bassist Arnold Fishkin. Most of the members of this band had played free improvisations together previously. May 16, 1949 was their third day as a band recording for Capitol Records, and Tristano decided to record some freely improvised playing.

== Recording and performance ==
The sequence in which the musicians would join in the ensemble playing, and the approximate timing of those entrances, were planned, but nothing else – harmony, key, time signature, tempo, melody or rhythm – was prepared or set. Instead, the five musicians were held together by "contrapuntal interaction".

Structure exists in the performance because of "the close interaction between musicians, as they enter in imitation of a figure previously stated by another member." Tristano opens the recording himself, then, at intervals of around 20 seconds, each of the other four musicians joins in. The pianist plays in an implied 4/4 meter, but adds phrases that provide others. Konitz's entrance reinforces a tonal center of C. Bauer initially responds to a scalar section, and then interacts closely with Tristano. Marsh also starts, at 1:09, by extending an earlier motif, them moves into 5/4 as the others, except for Fishkin, refrain from playing. The five members then interact together in counterpoint, before Tristano, at 1:44, plays some fast runs, which leads to further ensemble playing until Tristano repeats an A♭, signaling the close of the performance.

According to Tristano, "As soon as we began playing, the engineer threw up his hands and left his machine. The A&R man and management thought I was such an idiot that they refused to pay me for the sides and to release them."

== Release and reception ==
According to critic Barry Ulanov, four free improvisations were made at the session, but Capitol erased two of them. Tristano stated that the surviving sides were released only after disk jockey Symphony Sid played copies of them on his radio programs.

"Intuition" was released late in 1950 (on Capitol 7–1224), and was praised by critics. Ulanov described it, together with "Digression", as "the most audacious experiment yet attempted in jazz." Saxophonist Charlie Parker and composer Aaron Copland were also impressed. Numerous other musicians of the time, however, thought Tristano's music was too progressive and emotionally cold. The piece was included on Tristano's Crosscurrents album.

== Influence ==
The recording influenced bassist Charles Mingus, "whose earliest records sound eerily similar to those of Tristano in terms of style and compositional technique". The two sides preceded the free jazz recordings of Ornette Coleman by a decade.
