= Billy Bauer =

American jazz guitarist (1915–2005)

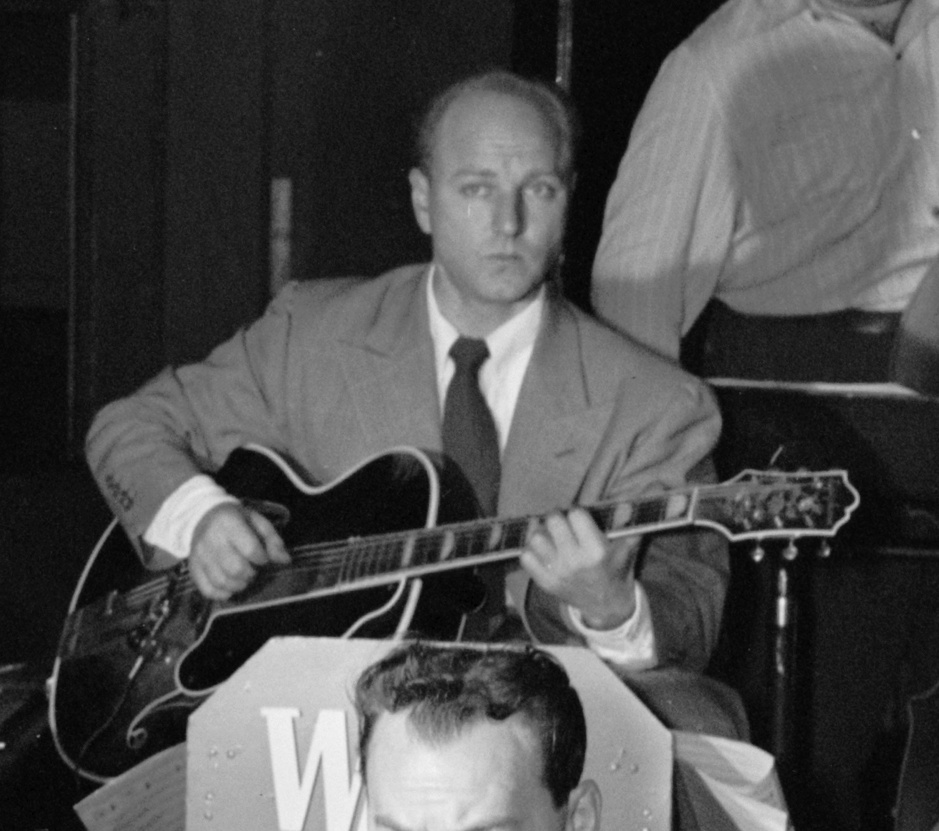

Background information
- Born: William Henry Bauer; November 14, 1915; New York City, U.S.
- Died: June 17, 2005 (aged 89) New York City, U.S.
- Genres: Jazz
- Occupation: Musician
- Instrument: Guitar
- Years active: 1930s–1990s
- Formerly of: Lennie Tristano, Lee Konitz
- Website: www.billybauersmusic.com

William Henry Bauer (November 14, 1915 – June 17, 2005) was an American jazz guitarist.

== Life ==
William Henry Bauer was born in New York City. He played ukulele and banjo as a child before switching to guitar. He played with the Jerry Wald band and recorded with Carl Hoff and His Orchestra in 1941, before joining Woody Herman in 1944 as a member of the First Herd. In 1946, he played with Benny Goodman and Jack Teagarden.

Working in small groups led by bassist Chubby Jackson and trombonist Bill Harris, Bauer established himself as a soloist in the bebop movement.

In 1946, he began working with Lennie Tristano. Tristano and Bauer enjoyed a natural synergy in their style and approach. Their development of "intuitive music" led to the 1949 session (collected on Crosscurrents) which included "Intuition", and "Digression". He was a member of the NBC Tonight Show band in New York City and played in the Today Show band at the start of early television.

Bauer continued his pioneering guitar work in a partnership with Lee Konitz, whose avant-garde saxophone work was a perfect match for Bauer's guitar. The two musicians' dialogue crossed styles from bop and cool to the avant-garde. Their recordings have been described as "some of the most beautiful duet recordings in jazz". "Duet For Saxophone and Guitar" was an unusual instrument pairing which has been described as redefining the role of jazz guitar.

Bauer made one album under his own name, Plectrist, in 1956. The CD reissue has been described as "demand[ing] the attention of anyone even remotely interested in jazz guitar". Later, he arranged the song "No One" that appeared on the CD Henry Golis Presents Good Music with Friends, which was released on Park Lane Drive Records in 2007.

He died of pneumonia in New York, aged 89.

== Teaching ==
In later life Bauer taught at the New York Conservatory of Modern Music and his own Billy Bauer Guitar School, first in Albertson, New York, then in Roslyn Heights, New York. He also published instructional books on studying music and playing the guitar.

Guitarists Denny Dias (later of the band Steely Dan) and Joe Satriani had lessons with Bauer.

Near the end of his career, Bauer appeared at the 1997 JVC Tributes for Barney Kessel and Tal Farlow. Bauer led the way for guitarists like Jimmy Raney and student Joe Satriani.

In 1997 he published his autobiography Sideman (with Thea Luba; ISBN 978-0-9657237-0-1).

== Discography ==
=== As leader ===
- Plectrist (Norgran, 1956)

=== As sideman ===
With Benny Goodman

- Benny in Brussels Volume 1 (Columbia, 1958)
- Benny in Brussels Volume 2 (Columbia, 1958)

With Lee Konitz

- Lee Konitz with Warne Marsh (Atlantic, 1955)
- Inside Hi-Fi (Atlantic, 1956)
- The Real Lee Konitz (Atlantic, 1957)
- Tranquility (Verve, 1957)
- An Image: Lee Konitz with Strings (Verve, 1958)

With Lennie Tristano

- Live at Birdland (Jazz, 1990)
- Wow (Jazz, 1991)
- Intuition (Proper Box, 2003)

With others

- Ralph Burns and Leonard Feather: Winter Sequence (MGM, 1954)
- Tony Aless, Long Island Suite (Royal Roost 1955)
- Charlie Parker, Charlie Parker Plays Cole Porter (Verve, 1957)
- George Barnes, Guitar Galaxies (Mercury, 1962)
- Al Caiola, The Guitar Style of Al Caiola (RCA Camden, 1962)
- Harry Carney, With Strings (Clef, 1955)
- Helen Carroll, Carl Kress, Singin' & Swingin' (Stere-O-Craft 1958)
- Al Cohn, Mr. Music (RCA Victor, 1955)
- Cozy Cole, Cozy Cole and Other All-Time Jazz Stars (Colortone 1959)
- Tommy Dorsey, The Music Goes Round and Round (Bluebird, 1991)
- Bobby Hackett, Jack Teagarden, Jazz Ultimate (Capitol, 1958)
- Dizzy Gillespie, The Complete RCA Victor Recordings (Bluebird, 1995)
- Bobby Hackett, Hawaii Swings (Capitol, 1960)
- Stan Hasselgard, Jammin' at Jubilee (Dragon, 1981)
- Coleman Hawkins, Centerpiece (Phoenix Jazz, 1976)
- Woody Herman, Songs for Hip Lovers (Verve, 1957)
- Billie Holiday, Stay with Me (Verve, 1958)
- Chubby Jackson, Sextet and Big Band (Prestige, 1969)
- J.J. Johnson, Jay & Kai (Savoy, 1954) - 4 tracks only
- Beverly Kenney, Come Swing with Me (LPTime, 2007)
- Big Miller, Did You Ever Hear the Blues? (United Artists, 1959)
- Chico O'Farrill, Jazz (Clef, 1953)
- Seldon Powell, Seldon Powell Plays (Royal Roost, 1956)
- Barry Ulanov, Tadd Dameron, Anthropology (Spotlite, 1972)
- Charlie Ventura, Jumping with Ventura (EmArcy, 1955)
- Ben Webster, Ben and the Boys (Jazz Archives, 1976)
- Cootie Williams, The Big Challenge (Jazztone, 1957)
