= Subconscious-Lee =

Studio album by Lee Konitz
- Released: 1955
- Recorded: January 11, 1949 – April 7, 1950
- Genre: Jazz
- Length: 56:05
- Label: Prestige / OJC

Lee Konitz chronology
| Subconscious-Lee (1955) | The New Sounds (1951) |

Professional ratings
Review scores
| Source | Rating |
|---|---|
| AllMusic | 5/5 stars |
| The Penguin Guide to Jazz Recordings | 3.5/4 stars |

Subconscious-Lee is a jazz album by Lee Konitz although a few tracks were issued on 78 rpm under Lennie Tristano's name. It was recorded in 1949 and 1950, and released on the Prestige label (originally as PRLP 7004 in 12-inch LP format in 1955 as follows in the OJC reissue).

== Track listing ==
1. "Progression" (Konitz) – 3:00
2. "Tautology" (Konitz) – 2:45
3. "Retrospection" (Lennie Tristano) – 3:09
4. "Subconscious-Lee" (Konitz) – 2:49
5. "Judy" (Tristano) – 2:56
6. "Marshmallow" (Warne Marsh) – 2:55
7. "Fishin' Around" (Marsh) – 3:47
8. "Tautology" (Konitz) – 2:56
9. "Sound-Lee" (Konitz) – 4:08
10. "Rebecca" (Konitz) – 3:05
11. "You Go to My Head" (J. Fred Coots, Haven Gillespie) – 2:38
12. "Ice Cream Konitz" (Konitz) – 2:45
13. "Palo Alto" (Konitz) – 2:31
- Recorded in New York City January 11, 1949 (1–5), June 28, 1949 (6, 7), September 27, 1949 (8, 9) and April 7, 1950 (10–13)

== Personnel ==
- Lee Konitz – alto saxophone
- Warne Marsh – tenor saxophone (6–9)
- Billy Bauer – guitar (1–5, 10–13)
- Lennie Tristano – piano (1–5)
- Sal Mosca – piano (6–13)
- Arnold Fishkin – bass
- Shelly Manne – drums (1, 2, 4)
- Denzil Best – drums (6, 7)
- Jeff Morton – drums (8–13)
