= Avant-garde jazz =

Music genre

Avant-garde Jazz
- Other names: Avant-jazz; experimental jazz; new thing
- Stylistic origins: Jazz; bebop; modernism; avant-garde; 20th-century classical
- Cultural origins: Mid-1950s United States
- Derivative forms: Free jazz; post-rock

Other topics
- Jazz fusion; progressive jazz

Avant-garde jazz (also known as avant-jazz, experimental jazz, or "new thing") is a style of music and improvisation that combines avant-garde art music and composition with jazz. It originated in the early 1950s and developed through the late 1960s. One of the earliest developments within avant-garde jazz was that of free jazz, and the two terms were originally synonymous. Much avant-garde jazz is stylistically distinct, however, in that it lacks free jazz's thoroughly improvised nature and is either fully or partially composed.

== History ==
=== 1950s ===
While some avant-garde jazz concepts were originally developed in the late 1940s (such as the collective free improvisation on Lennie Tristano's 1949 works of "Intuition" and "Digression"), the advent of avant-garde jazz (synonymous with free jazz at the time) is usually considered to be sometime in the mid- to late 1950s. As a genre, avant-garde jazz was founded among a group of improvisors who rejected the conventions of bebop and post bop in an effort to blur the division between the written and the spontaneous aspects of these genres. In addition to continuing the tradition of experimentation within jazz (a phenomenon evidenced by the development of earlier offshoots of bebop, such as cool jazz, modal jazz, and hard bop), jazz artists would also begin incorporating modernist ideas, such as atonality and serialism.

With the release of The Shape of Jazz to Come in 1959, saxophonist Ornette Coleman paved the way for free (and avant-garde) jazz. Soon thereafter, he was joined by Cecil Taylor, and they formed the "first wave" of avant-garde jazz music. Eventually, some would come to apply avant-garde jazz differently from free jazz; avant-garde jazz emphasizes structure and organization by the use of composed melodies, shifting but nevertheless predetermined meters and tonalities, and distinctions between soloists and accompaniment (rather than a "free" approach to improvisation devoid of predetermined structure).

=== 1960s ===
After the birth of avant-garde jazz in the 1950s, the "second wave" of avant-garde jazz was marked by artists such as John Coltrane, Eric Dolphy, Charles Mingus, and Albert Ayler (among others). In Chicago, the Association for the Advancement of Creative Musicians began pursuing their own variety of avant-garde jazz. The AACM musicians (Muhal Richard Abrams, Anthony Braxton, Roscoe Mitchell, Hamid Drake, and the Art Ensemble of Chicago) tended towards eclecticism. Poet Amiri Baraka, an important figure in the Black Arts Movement (BAM), recorded spoken word tracks with the New York Art Quartet (“Black Dada Nihilismus,” 1964, ESP) and Sunny Murray (“Black Art,” 1965, Jihad).

While avant-garde jazz did gain some traction throughout the 1960s (especially with John Coltrane), most avant-garde jazz musicians did not enjoy the same levels of popularity. Avant-garde jazz gradually shifted from being performed mainly in jazz clubs to other spaces, such as museums and community performance centers, with some artists relocating to Europe.

== See also ==
- European free jazz
- BYG Actuel
- ESP-Disk
- Jazz fusion

== Bibliography ==
- Berendt, Joachim E. (1992). The Jazz Book: From Ragtime to Fusion and Beyond. Revised by Günther Huesmann, translated by H. and B. Bredigkeit with Dan Morgenstern. Brooklyn: Lawrence Hill Books. ISBN 1-55652-098-0
- Kofsky, Frank (1970). Black Nationalism and the Revolution in Music. New York: Pathfinder Press.
- Mandel, Howard (2008). Miles, Ornette, Cecil: Jazz Beyond Jazz. Preface by Greg Tate. New York City: Routledge. ISBN 0415967147
