= Sonny Dallas =

American jazz bassist and singer (1931–2007)

- Born: Francis Dominic Joseph Dallas; October 27, 1931; Rankin, Pennsylvania, U.S.
- Died: July 22, 2007 (aged 75)
- Genres: Jazz
- Occupation: Musician
- Instruments: Double bass; vocals
- Years active: mid-1950s–1960s

Francis Dominic Joseph Dallas (October 27, 1931 – July 22, 2007), also known as Frank "Sonny" Dallas, was an American jazz bassist and singer.

== Biography ==
Born in 1931, in Rankin, Pennsylvania, Dallas studied bass with Herman Clements, principal bassist of the Pittsburgh Symphony Orchestra (who also taught jazz bassists Ray Brown and Paul Chambers), and by the mid-1950s, he was working with bandleaders Charlie Spivak, Ray Eberle, and Claude Thornhill.

Moving to New York in 1955, he began performing and recording with the likes of Sal Salvador, Tony Scott, Chet Baker, Buck Clayton, Lee Konitz, Warne Marsh, Phil Woods, Gene Quill, Zoot Sims, Al Cohn, Elvin Jones, Mary Lou Williams, Bill Evans, George Wallington, Jackie Paris, and Lennie Tristano, the last of whom he was most closely associated.

Moving to Long Island in the late 1960s, he obtained a Master of Arts degree in music education and began teaching at both Suffolk County Community College and Dowling College.

In an article, DownBeat listed Dallas as one of the top ten greatest jazz bassists.

Dallas died of heart failure in 2007 in Long Island, New York. He is survived by two daughters, Deborah and Elizabeth, and a son, Robert.

== Discography ==
=== With Lee Konitz ===
- You and Lee (Verve, 1959)
- Motion (Verve, 1961)

=== With Sal Salvador ===
- Shades of Sal Salvador (Betlehem, 1957)
- Tribute to the Greats (Betlehem, 1957)

=== With Lennie Tristano ===
- Descent into the Maelstrom (East Wind, 1952–53; 1965–66 [1976])
- Note to Note (Jazz Records, 1964–65 [1993])
- Continuity (Jazz Records, 1958; 1964 [1985])

=== With Phil Woods ===
- Phil Talks with Quill (Epic, 1957 [1959]) – with Gene Quill
- Warm Woods (Epic, 1957 [1958])
