= Winter Sequence =

- The initial American release (catalog number: E270) features the musicians in red, while the British release (MGM D-135) has them in blue.

Studio album by Ralph Burns, Leonard Feather, and their orchestra
- Released: December 1954
- Genre: Christmas jazz
- Length: 24:35
- Language: Instrumental
- Label: MGM

Winter Sequence is a 1954 Christmas jazz album from American pianist Ralph Burns and British music critic Leonard Feather with an ad hoc ensemble of musicians, released on MGM Records.

== Recording, release, and reception ==
Feather composed the tracks as a musical suite that would allow one musician per track to serve as a soloist, with the orchestra arranged by Burns. A contemporary review for Billboard called the album an "unusual" blend of jazz and pop and concludes that "jazz aficiandos will like it most". The album was released as a 10" LP, followed in 1958 by a 12" LP entitled The Swinging Seasons (catalog number E 3613) that also included Dick Hyman's "The Swingin' Seasons", "Sounds of Spring", "Summer Sequence", and "Early Autumn".

== Track listing ==
All songs written by Ralph Burns and Leonard Feather

1. "Dasher" (solo by Herbie Mann) – 2:42
2. "Dancer" (solo by Danny Bank) – 3:11
3. "Prancer" (solo by Ralph Burns) – 2:54
4. "Vixen" (solo by Kai Winding) – 4:08
5. "Comet" (solo by Oscar Pettiford) – 2:52
6. "Cupid" (solo by Billy Bauer) – 3:12
7. "Donner" (solo by Osie Johnson) – 3:16
8. "Blitzen" (solo by Joe Wilder) – 2:20

== Personnel ==
- Danny Bank – saxophone
- Billy Bauer – guitar
- Ralph Burns – piano, arrangement
- Osie Johnson – drums
- Herbie Mann – flute
- Oscar Pettiford – double bass
- Joe Wilder – trumpet
- Kai Winding – trombone
