= Crosscurrents (Lennie Tristano album) =

Studio album by Lennie Tristano
- Released: 1972
- Recorded: March 4, 14, April 23, May 16, August 24, November 2, 1949
- Genre: Jazz
- Label: Capitol (M-11060)

Professional ratings
Review scores
Source	Rating
AllMusic	5/5 stars

Crosscurrents is an album by jazz pianist Lennie Tristano. The sides were recorded in 1949 and the album released by Capitol in 1972. The album was inducted into the Grammy Hall of Fame in 2013.

== Music ==
The first seven tracks are recordings of Tristano's sextet, containing Warne Marsh (tenor sax), Lee Konitz (alto sax), Billy Bauer (guitar), Arnold Fishkin (bass), and Harold Granowsky or Denzil Best (drums; separately). They include "the earliest examples of free improvisation in jazz: 'Intuition' and 'Digression'". It was reissued by Capitol as part of the Intuition 1996 CD re-issue, in combination with Warne Marsh's Jazz of Two Cities. Tracks 8–13 (side B) are an unrelated set of recordings by Buddy DeFranco.

== Track listing ==
1. "Wow" – Lennie Tristano
2. "Crosscurrent" – Lennie Tristano
3. "Yesterdays" – Lennie Tristano
4. "Marionette" – Billie Bauer
5. "Sax of a Kind" – Lee Konitz, Warne Marsh
6. "Intuition" – improvisation libre
7. "Digression" – improvisation libre
8. "A bird in Igor's Yard – George Russell
9. "This time the dream's on me" – Harold Arlen-Johnny Mercer*
10. "Extrovert" – Harvey Leonard
11. "Good for nothing Joe" – Rube Bloom, Ted Koehler
12. "Aishie" – Theodore Cohen
13. "Opus 96" – Neal Hefti

== Personnel ==
- Lennie Tristano – piano
- Warne Marsh – tenor sax
- Lee Konitz – alto sax
- Billy Bauer – guitar
- Arnold Fishkin – bass
- Harold Granowsky – drums
- Denzil Best – drums
