= Motion (Lee Konitz album) =

Studio album by Lee Konitz
- Released: 1961
- Recorded: August 29, 1961
- Studio: Olmsted Sound; New York City
- Genre: Jazz
- Length: 37:58
- Label: Verve
- Producer: Creed Taylor

Motion is an album by jazz saxophonist Lee Konitz, recorded in 1961 for Verve Records. It features drummer Elvin Jones and bassist Sonny Dallas. It is regarded by many as Konitz's finest album. The 1990 CD issue expanded the number of tracks from five to eight; a 1998 release then expanded this to 38, although most of the additional tracks were from different recording sessions with drummer Nick Stabulas instead of Elvin Jones.

== Music ==
The album consists of performances of five standards, although "the heads when they are stated at all are for the most part fragmentary and more alluded to than stated". On the first track, "I Remember You", Dallas' bass lines provide the song's structure, while Konitz' phrasing, across bar lines and behind the beat, and Jones' drumming are subtly phrased. "Foolin' Myself" has some role-reversal, with Konitz providing harmonic support for Dallas' soloing.

== Critical reception ==
Professional ratings
Review scores
Source	Rating
AllMusic	4/5 stars
The Penguin Guide to Jazz	👑
The Rolling Stone Jazz Record Guide	5/5 stars

The Penguin Guide to Jazz gives the album a four-star rating plus a special "crown" accolade and includes it as part of a selected "Core Collection", stating that it is "one of the great modern jazz records".

== Track listing ==
1. "I Remember You" (Victor Schertzinger, Johnny Mercer) – 4:30
2. "All of Me" (Gerald Marks, Seymour Simons) – 7:41
3. "Foolin' Myself" (Jack Lawrence, Peter Tinturin) – 7:01
4. "You'd Be So Nice to Come Home To" (Cole Porter) – 10:45
5. "I'll Remember April" (Gene DePaul, Patricia Johnston, Don Raye) – 8:01

== Personnel ==
- Lee Konitz – alto saxophone
- Sonny Dallas – bass
- Elvin Jones – drums

Technical

- Pete Turner – photography
