= Barry Ulanov =

American music critic (1918–2000)

Baruch "Barry" Ulanov (April 10, 1918 – April 30, 2000) was an American writer, perhaps best known as a jazz critic.

== Background ==
Barry Ulanov was born in Manhattan, New York City. He received early instruction on the violin from his father Nathan who was concertmaster for Arturo Toscanini's NBC Symphony Orchestra. He ceased playing the instrument after a car crash in which he broke both wrists. He studied at Columbia University taking his BA there in 1939. While at Columbia, he was Chairman of the Boar's Head Society, President of the Philolexian Society,, and wrote about jazz and also attended jazz concerts, including an early performance of "Strange Fruit" by Billie Holiday at the Café Society.

== Career ==
Soon after graduating he edited several magazines and journals on music. He was editor of the journal Metronome from 1943 to 1955 and increased its coverage of modern jazz music as well as promoting contemporary African American musicians.

Ulanov was an early advocate of bebop and the music of Charlie Parker and Dizzy Gillespie. In the early 1950s, as part of a Metronome sponsored event, he ran The New Jazz Society which met at a West 54th Street club where Charlie Parker occupied the weekend residency. The jazz pianist Lennie Tristano wrote the composition "Coolin' Off With Ulanov", a personal testament to the affinity that many jazz musicians had with Ulanov. He organized several concerts of bop stars for WOR radio in 1947. He received his Ph.D. from Columbia in the 1950s. From 1955 to 1958, he wrote for DownBeat, and published several biographies of jazz musicians in the 1940s and 1950s. In his autobiography Miles Davis referred to Ulanov as the only white critic who ever understood him or Charlie Parker. He taught at Juilliard (1946), Princeton (1950–51), and Barnard College (1951–1988) as well as at Columbia University and Union Theological Seminary. In 1962 he received a Guggenheim Fellowship.

Ulanov converted to Catholicism in 1951 and was one of the sponsors at the baptism of the jazz pianist and composer Mary Lou Williams in 1957. After his conversion, he began to write more on the subjects of religion and psychology. He was the president of the Catholic Renascence Society and founder of a St. Thomas More Society; he and his wife, Joan Bel Geddes (daughter of Norman Bel Geddes), translated many essays and books on Catholicism. He advocated the use of amplified music in church, including rock music. He promoted the idea that the entertainment media should be more Christian in nature, taking to task the movies, music, plays, and particularly comic books (which he called the worst product of the press) in the 1950s.

In the last twenty years of his life, Ulanov concentrated on explorations of religion and psychology, and published over 10 books with his second wife, Ann Belford Ulanov, Professor of Psychiatry and Religion at Union Theological Seminary in New York and psychoanalyst in private practice.

Barry Ulanov died of colorectal cancer on April 30, 2000, aged 82. The Annual Barry Ulanov Memorial Lecture Series is held each year at the Union Theological Seminary.

== Teaching style ==
June Jordan, the poet, author, and activist, was a student of Ulanov's at Barnard College. In an essay that appeared in her book Civil Wars, Jordan described with nostalgic admiration a surprise in-class exam administered by Ulanov. Ulanov told the students to write about anything they wanted without using any form of the verbs to be or to have. Jordan went on to say how difficult yet worthwhile the exam was.

== Partial bibliography ==
- Duke Ellington (1946)
- The Incredible Crosby (1948)
- A History of Jazz in America (1952)
- A Handbook of Jazz (1957)
- The Making of a Modern Saint: A Biographical Study of Thèrése of Liseux
- Death: A Book of Preparation and Consolation (1959)
- Sources & Resources: The Literary Traditions of Christian Humanism (1960)
- The Bridge: A Judeo-Christian Journal (?) with Msgr. John Oesterreicher
- The Way of Saint Alphonsus of Liguori (1960)
- Makers of the Modern Theater (1961)
- Seeds of Hope in the Modern World 1962)
- Contemporary Catholic Thought (1963)
- The Two World of American Art: The Private and the Popular (1965)
- Modern Culture and the Arts (1972) (with James B. Hall)
- The Prayers of St. Augustine (1983)
- Creative Dissent: Psychoanalysis in Evolution (1983) (with Alan Roland, Claude Barbre)
- Men and Women: Sexual Ethics in Turbulent Times (1989)
- Jung and the Outside World (1992)
- On Death: Wisdom and Consolation from the World's Great Writers (1996)

with Joan Bel Geddes:

- George Bernanos translation of novel (?)

with Ann Belford Ulanov:

- Primary Speech: A Psychology of Prayer (1975)
- Cinderella and Her Sisters: The Envied and the Envying (1978)
- Religion and the Unconscious (1985)
- The Witch and the Clown: Two Archetypes of Human Sexuality (1987)
- The Healing Imagination: The Meeting of Psyche and Soul (1991)
- Transforming Sexuality: The Archetypal World of Anima and Animus (1994)

other:

- Groovin' High by Barry Ulanov & His Metronome All-Stars (Music Download)
