= Lee Konitz =

American jazz musician (1927–2020)

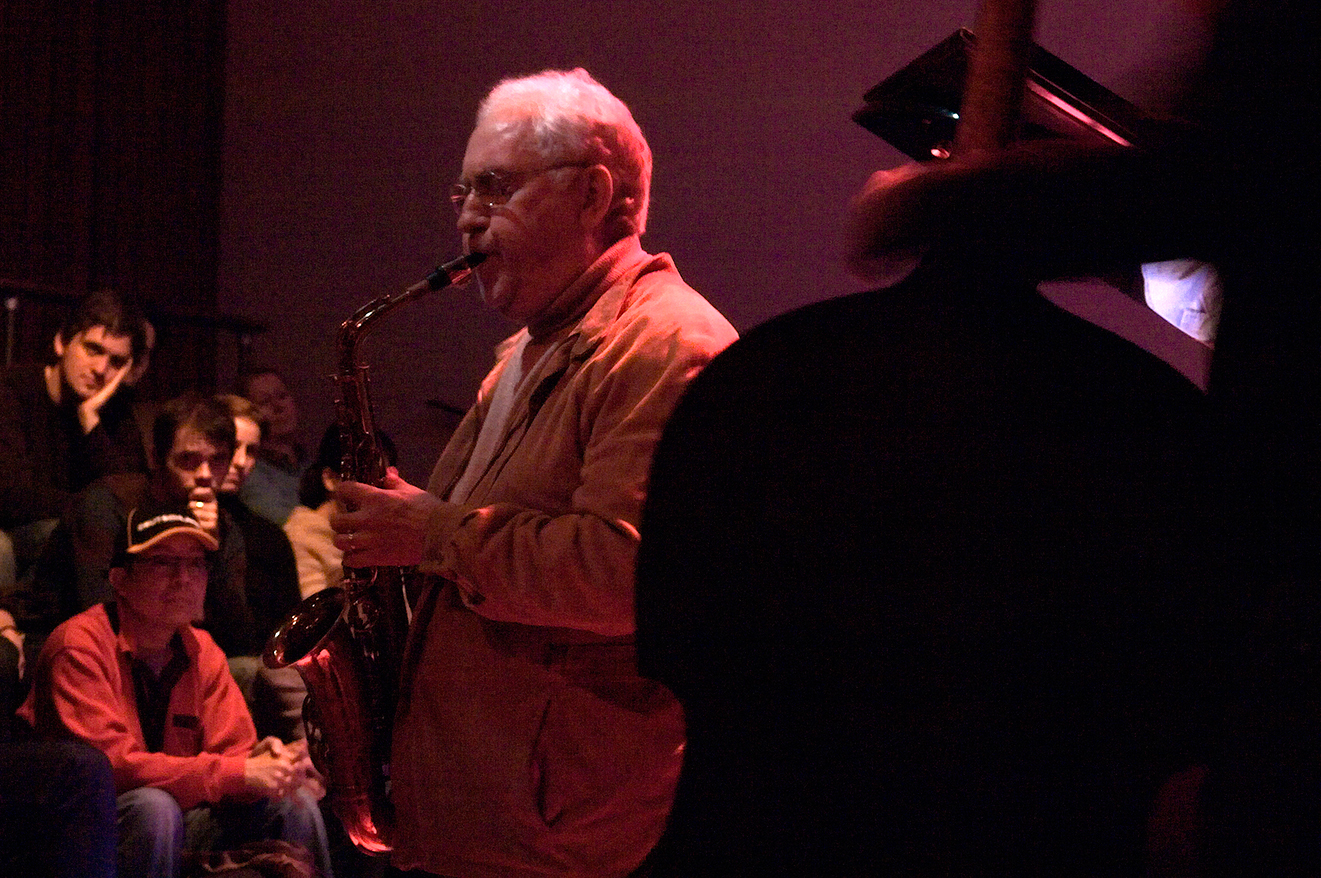
- Konitz performing in 2007

Background information
- Born: Leon Konitz; October 13, 1927; Chicago, Illinois, U.S.
- Died: April 15, 2020 (aged 92) New York City, U.S.
- Genres: Jazz, cool jazz
- Occupations: Musician, composer
- Instrument: Alto saxophone
- Years active: 1945–2019
- Labels: RCA, Atlantic, Verve, Prestige, Palmetto, Whirlwind

Leon "Lee" Konitz (October 13, 1927 – April 15, 2020) was an American jazz alto saxophonist and composer.

He performed successfully in a wide range of jazz styles, including bebop, cool jazz, and avant-garde jazz. Konitz's association with the cool jazz movement of the 1940s and 1950s includes participation in Miles Davis's Birth of the Cool sessions and his work with pianist Lennie Tristano. He was one of relatively few alto saxophonists of this era to retain a distinctive style, when Charlie Parker exerted a massive influence. Like other students of Tristano, Konitz improvised long, melodic lines with the rhythmic interest coming from odd accents, or odd note groupings suggestive of the imposition of one time signature over another. Other saxophonists were strongly influenced by Konitz, such as Paul Desmond and Art Pepper.

He died during the COVID-19 pandemic from complications brought on by the disease.

== Biography ==
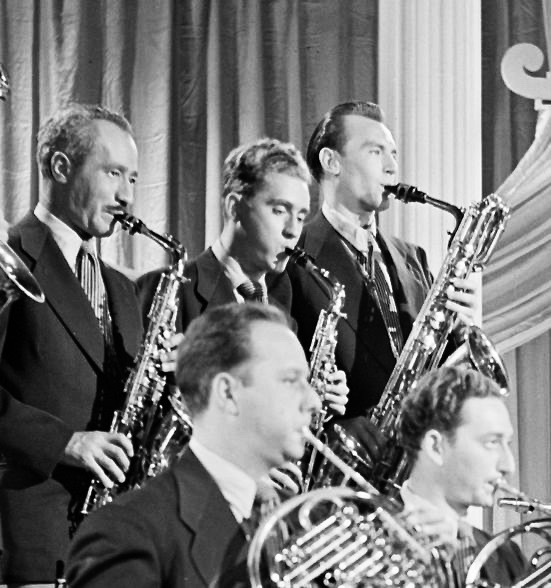
Konitz (top, center) performing at Columbia Pictures studios for Beautiful Doll in 1947

=== Early life ===
Konitz was born in 1927 in Chicago to Jewish emigrants Abraham Konitz (1897–1964) and Anna Getlin (1900–1973). Konitz had two older brothers, Sol (1919–1997) and Herman (later Herman Kaye; 1921–2005).

His father, who was born in Brody, Austria-Hungary (now Ukraine), operated a laundry business in the back of which the family lived. His mother was born in the Pinsk District (now Belarus). Lee went to Hebrew school for a short time and attended synagogue sometimes. The Konitz family was not strict religiously, but observed Jewish holidays and some dietary laws. Lee was ambivalent about traditional Jewish culture and said, "there was something in-groupish about the Jewish people that I saw, that I didn't like–there was always that word Gentile which I hated." Neither of his parents were musical but were supportive of Konitz's interest in music.

Aged 11, inspired by Benny Goodman, Konitz received his first clarinet. He received classical training from Lou Honig who also taught Johnny Griffin and Eddie Harris. A year later, his admiration for Lester Young led him to drop the instrument in favour of the tenor saxophone. He eventually moved from the tenor to the alto. He received saxophone training from Santy Runyon. Konitz's early influences were big band saxophonists players such as Johnny Hodges, Roy Eldridge, Willie Smith, and Scoops Carry. He also greatly admired Louis Armstrong and credited the influence Benny Carter's solo on "I Can't Believe that You're in Love with Me" had on him.

=== Career ===
Konitz began his professional career in 1945 with the Teddy Powell band as a replacement for Charlie Ventura. A month later, the band broke up. Between 1945 and 1947, he worked intermittently with Jerry Wald. In 1946, he met pianist Lennie Tristano, and the two men worked together in a small cocktail bar. His next substantial work was with Claude Thornhill in 1947, with Gil Evans arranging and Gerry Mulligan as a composer.

He participated with Miles Davis in a group that had a brief booking in September 1948 and another the following year, but he also recorded with the band in 1949 and 1950; the tracks were later compiled on the album Birth of the Cool (Capitol, 1957). In his autobiography, Davis related that some Black musicians resented his hiring of Konitz: "Then a lot of black musicians came down on my case about their not having work, and here I was hiring white guys in my band. So I just told them that if a guy could play as good as Lee Konitz played — that's who they were mad about most, because there were a lot of black alto players around — I would hire him every time [...] I'm hiring a motherfucker to play, not for what color he is."

Konitz stated he considered the group to belong to Mulligan. His debut as leader also came in 1949 with tracks collected on the album Subconscious-Lee. (Prestige, 1955). He turned down an opportunity to work with Goodman in 1949, a decision he later regretted. Charlie Parker lent him support on the day Konitz's child was born in Seattle, Washington, while he was stuck in New York City. The two were good friends, not the rivals some jazz critics made them out to be.

In the early 1950s, Konitz recorded and toured with the Stan Kenton Orchestra, but also continued to record as a leader. In 1961, he recorded Motion for Verve, with Elvin Jones on drums and Sonny Dallas on bass. This spontaneous session consisted entirely of jazz standards. The loose trio format aptly featured Konitz's unorthodox phrasing and chromaticism.

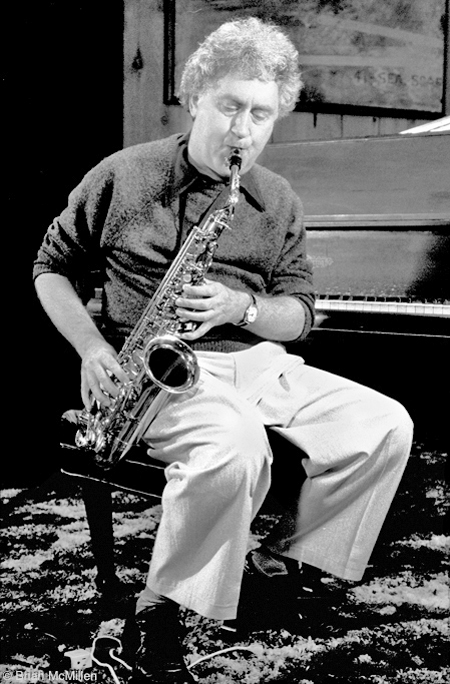
Konitz at Bach Dancing & Dynamite Society, Half Moon Bay, California, 1985

In 1967, Konitz recorded The Lee Konitz Duets for Milestone, in configurations that were often unusual for the period (saxophone and trombone, two saxophones). The recordings drew on nearly the entire history of jazz from Louis Armstrong's "Struttin' with Some Barbecue", with valve trombonist Marshall Brown, to two free improvisation duos: one with a Duke Ellington associate, violinist Ray Nance, and one with guitarist Jim Hall.

Konitz contributed to the film score for Desperate Characters (1971). In 1981, he performed at the Woodstock Jazz Festival, which was held in celebration of the tenth anniversary of the Creative Music Studio.

Konitz worked with Warne Marsh, Dave Brubeck, Ornette Coleman, Charles Mingus, Attila Zoller, Gerry Mulligan, and Elvin Jones. He recorded trio dates with Brad Mehldau and Charlie Haden, released by Blue Note, as well as a live album recorded in 2009 at Birdland and released by ECM in 2011, with drummer Paul Motian. Konitz became more experimental as he grew older and released a number of free jazz and avant-garde jazz albums, performing with many younger musicians, including saxophonist/composer Ohad Talmor with whom he collaborated on six albums, featuring mostly new Konitz's music arranged by Talmor for a variety of ensembles. He soloed on Elvis Costello's song "Someone Took the Words Away" in 2003, and his album with saxophonist/vocalist Grace Kelly was rated 4-1/2 stars by DownBeat magazine.

Konitz had heart problems requiring surgery. He was scheduled to appear at the Melbourne Recital Centre in 2011 for the Melbourne International Jazz Festival, but canceled due to illness.

In August 2012, Konitz played to sell-out crowds at the Blue Note club in Greenwich Village, as part of Enfants Terribles, a collaboration with Bill Frisell, Gary Peacock, and Joey Baron. Days after his 87th birthday in 2014, he played three nights at Cafe Stritch in San Jose, California, with the Jeff Denson Trio, improvising on his favored old standards. In 2018, his duo album Decade (Verve) celebrated both his 90th birthday and ten years of collaboration with pianist Dan Tepfer.

== Personal life ==
Konitz was married three times. His first wife was Ruth Hamalainen. Ruth appears to have been a writer before she married, as she wrote an article with Barry Ulanov about Lennie Tristano that was published in the November 1946 issue of Metronome. Lee and Ruth had five children: Josh, Paul, Rebecca, Stephanie, and Karen. Karen was the inspiration for his 1956 song "Kary's Trance"; Rebecca inspired the 1950 improvisation "Rebecca", and the 1951 original "Hi, Beck"; "Stephanie" inspired a so-called ballad tune from 1958. Lee and Ruth later divorced. His second wife was Tavia Maria Mladinich (1931–1991), who died while they were married. A song named for her appeared on his 1977 album Pyramid. His third wife was Gundula. They divorced also, though they remained close friends. He wrote a ballad for her entitled "Gundula" that he recorded for the first time on the 1999 album Pride. Konitz died at Lenox Hill Hospital in New York City on April 15, 2020, as a result of pneumonia brought on by COVID-19 during the pandemic in New York City.

== Television appearances ==
- SOLOS: The Jazz Sessions (2004)
- Weightless (2009) – a recording session with Jakob Bro
- Public television series in the late 1950s with Warne Marsh, Billy Taylor, Bill Evans, Mundell Lowe, and others

== Sources ==
- Hamilton, Andy and Konitz, Lee (2007), Lee Konitz: Conversations on the Improviser's Art, University of Michigan Press, ISBN 0472032178. Crafted out of numerous interviews between the author and his subject, the book describes Konitz's life and music.
- Beaumont-Thomas, Ben (2020), ‘’Lee Konitz, jazz saxophonist with 75-year career, dies of coronavirus aged 92’’, The Guardian
